= List of companies based in Gurgaon =

This is a list of companies based in Gurgaon. Gurgaon, also known as Gurugram, is a city in the Indian state of Haryana, located immediately south of the National Capital Territory of Delhi, 32 kilometres (20 mi) southwest of New Delhi and 268 km (167 mi) southeast of Chandigarh, the capital of both the Indian states of Haryana and Punjab. As of 2011 Gurgaon had a population of 876,969. Witnessing rapid urbanisation, Gurgaon has become a leading financial and industrial hub with the highest per capita income in India.

== Companies based in Gurgaon ==
- Agilus Diagnostics
- Air India
- Amartex
- Amdocs
- Apollo Tyres
- Aristocrat Leisure
- Artemis Hospital
- Aviva India
- Ballarpur Industries
- Balrampur Chini Mills
- Bharti Airtel
- Blinkit
- BluSmart
- Central Transmission Utility of India Limited (CTUIL)
- Ciena
- Colt Technology Services
- Comviva
- Delhivery
- DLF
- DreamFolks
- Dunzo
- Eicher Motors
- Employees State Insurance Corporation
- Engineers India
- English Indian Clays Ltd (EICL)
- FabFurnish
- FabHotels
- Fortis Healthcare
- Freecharge
- Goibibo
- Hero MotoCorp
- Housing.com
- Hughes Systique Corporation
- Hyundai Motor India
- Ibibo
- ICRA Limited
- IL&FS Technologies Limited
- Indiabulls
- Indian Farmers Fertiliser Cooperative
- IndiGo
- Indus Towers
- Info Edge
- Ircon International
- ixigo
- IYogi
- Jabong.com
- Jaquar
- JBM Group (Jay Bharat Maruti Ltd.)
- Jindal Stainless
- Jindal Steel and Power
- Lemon Tree Hotels
- Lenskart
- Limeroad
- Lybrate
- MakeMyTrip
- Mankind Pharma
- Mavenir
- Max Healthcare
- Max Life Insurance
- Medanta
- Mettl
- Micromax Informatics
- MobiKwik
- MullenLowe Lintas Group
- NIIT
- NTT Data
- Oyo Rooms
- Paper Boat
- Paras Healthcare
- Policybazaar
- Power Grid Corporation of India
- Pristyn Care
- Punj Lloyd
- PVR Cinemas
- Raheja Developers
- RailTel
- Ranbaxy Laboratories
- Rapido
- ReNew Power
- Revv Cars
- RITES
- Roposo
- Rural Electrification Corporation
- Satya Paul
- SBI Cards
- Shalimar Paints
- ShopClues
- Shuttl
- Snapdeal
- SpiceJet
- SRF Limited
- Sterlite Technologies
- Stryker
- Su-Kam Power Systems
- Tejas Networks
- Tex Corp
- Times Internet
- Tower Research
- Transport Corporation of India
- Varun Beverages
- Verint Systems
- WAPCOS Limited
- Xerox India
- Yatra
- Yebhi
- Zomato
- Zostel
- ZS Associates

== See also ==
- List of companies based in Hyderabad
