= List of companies based in Hyderabad =

This is a non-exhaustive list of prominent companies based in Hyderabad, Telangana (i.e. having their headquarters in Hyderabad).

- Adyar Ananda Bhavan
- Aurobindo Pharma
- Bharat Biotech
- Biological E. Limited
- Central Institute of Tool Design
- Cyient
- Deccan Chronicle
- Divi's Laboratories
- Dr. Reddy's Laboratories
- Electronics Corporation of India
- ETV Network
- Glenmark Pharmaceuticals
- GMR Group
- GVK
- Heritage Foods
- Hetero Drugs
- Indian Immunologicals Limited
- Keka HR
- Krishna Institute of Medical Sciences
- Laurus Labs
- Natco Pharma
- NMDC
- Nuclear Fuel Complex
- Pulsus Group
- Satyam Computer Services Ltd
- Skyroot Aerospace
- Tata Advanced Systems
- Tata Business Support Services

== See also ==
- List of companies based in Gurgaon
