= Confederation of Hospitality, Technology and Tourism Industry =

Travel and hospitality association

Confederation of Hospitality, Technology and Tourism Industry (CHATT)
- Abbreviation: CHATT
- Formation: June 2021
- Founder: Airbnb EaseMyTrip Oyo Rooms makemytrip Yatra (company)
- Type: Non-governmental trade association
- Purpose: Development of SMEs in the Hospitality and tourism Sector
- Headquarters: New Delhi, India
- Services: MSMEs promotion, Networking, Policy Reforms
- Secretary General: Anwar Shirpurwala
- Website: www.chattindia.org

Confederation of Hospitality, Technology and Tourism Industry (CHATT) is a travel and hospitality association formed to promote domestic tourism, guide and train small business owners and share resources, and bring digital transformation in the sector.

It was launched in June 2021 by Union Minister Prahlad Singh Patel, the Minister for Tourism and Culture, Government of India.

CHATT founder members are Airbnb, EaseMyTrip, MakeMyTrip, Oyo Rooms and Yatra. It is represented by Amanpreet Bajaj, the general manager of Airbnb (India, Southeast Asia, Hong Kong and Taiwan); Ritesh Agarwal, Founder & Group CEO of Oyo Rooms (India and Southeast Asia); Dhruv Shringi, the co-founder of Yatra; Rajesh Magow, the co-founder & group chief executive officer of MakeMyTrip and Nishant Pitti, the co-founder of EaseMyTrip.

== Leadership ==
Anwar Shirpurwala is the Secretary General of the Confederation of Hospitality, Technology and Tourism Industry (CHATT).

== Events ==
- CHATT Secretary General, Shri Anwar Shirpurwala addressed the 3-day National Conference of State Tourism Ministers held in Dharamshala, Himachal Pradesh. The conference saw the presence of Union Tourism Minister, Shri G. Kishan Reddy; MoS, Shri Shripad Naik & Shri Ajay Bhatt; Secretary, Shri Arvind Singh; Additional Secretary, Shri R.K. Verma; Director General, Shri G.K.V. Rao along with state tourism ministers and top officials from state tourism departments.
- A CHATT delegation paid a courtesy call on top officials of the Ministry of Tourism, Government of India & had a fruitful discussion with Shri Arvind Singh, Secretary; Smt. G. Kamala Vardhana Rao, Director General, and Additional Secretary, Shri Rakesh Verma on the need for digitalising MSMEs that constitute the backbone of tourism in India.
- A high-level delegation of the founding members of Confederation of Hospitality, Technology, and Tourism Industry (CHATT) made a courtesy call on Shri G. Kishan Reddy, Hon'ble Union Minister For Culture, Tourism And Development Of North Eastern Region (DoNER), Government of India to discuss ways to boost tourism in India.
- Honourable Union Minister, Shri Prahlad Singh Patel virtually launched industry body Confederation of Hospitality, Technology and Tourism Industry (CHATT). The webinar was attended by the founding members of CHATT – Airbnb, EaseMyTrip, MakeMyTrip, Oyo and Yatra.
