= Frederic Lalonde =

- Born: Quebec City, Quebec, Canada
- Occupation: Entrepreneur
- Years active: 1993-present
- Notable work: Hopper, Inc.; Newtrade Technologies; Deep Sky
- Title: CEO of Hopper, Inc.
- Board member of: MakeMyTrip; Ixigo; Reseau mentorat

Frederic Lalonde is a Canadian entrepreneur and co-founder of the travel company Hopper, Inc. He currently serves as the chief executive officer of the company.

== Early life ==
Frederic Lalonde grew up in Quebec City, Canada. His father is a biologist. Lalonde developed an interest in technology at a young age, describing himself as a hacker. At the age of 19, he left school to pursue entrepreneurship.

== Career ==
In 1993, Lalonde moved to Los Angeles to establish an online airfare-ticketing company called Travel Online. In 1997, he moved to Montreal and later co-founded Newtrade Technologies, where he served as the executive vice president and chief technology officer. Newtrade Technologies was subsequently acquired by Expedia in 2002. During his tenure at Expedia, Lalonde served as the vice president of hotels and package product planning. In this position, he played a significant role in developing the Direct Connect product strategy, which led to the inclusion of major hotel chains such as Marriott and Hilton to the Expedia platform. Lalonde also facilitated several merger and acquisition activities, including those with TripAdvisor and Hotels.com.

In 2007, Lalonde co-founded Hopper, Inc. in Montreal with Joost Ouwerkerk, a former product manager at Expedia. Lalonde oversaw the expansion of the company's services to include hotel bookings, fintech features, and sustainability initiatives like "Hopper Trees," through which the company funds tree planting activities for every travel booking made.

In September 2022, Lalonde co-founded Deep Sky with Joost Ouwerkerk and former Airbnb CFO Laurence Tosi. He serves as chairman of the company, which is based in Montreal and focuses on carbon removal projects.

In addition to the companies he founded, Lalonde has also been active on several boards. He is a member of the board of directors of MakeMyTrip, a major online travel company in India. Additionally, he serves on the board of directors for Ixigo and Reseau Mentorat.
