= Netaji Subhas University of Technology =

State university in Dwarka, Delhi, India

- Former names: Netaji Subhas Institute of Technology; Delhi Institute of Technology
- Motto: ā no bhadrā kratvo yantu viśwataḥ
- Motto in English: Let noble thoughts come to me from all directions
- Type: State university
- Established: 1983; 43 years ago
- Affiliations: Autonomous
- Chancellor: Lieutenant Governor of Delhi
- Vice-Chancellor: Anand Srivastava
- Location: Delhi, India; 28°36′39.5″N 77°2′18.5″E
- Campus: Urban, 149.53 acres (60.51 ha)
- Colours
- Website: www.nsut.ac.in

The Netaji Subhas University of Technology (NSUT), formerly Netaji Subhas Institute of Technology (NSIT) is a state university located in Dwarka, Delhi, India. In 2018, the institute was granted university status, changing its name to Netaji Subhas University of Technology (NSUT).

== History ==
The Ministry of Human Resource Development (MHRD) established an engineering college named Delhi Institute of Technology (DIT) in 1983. The institute was then affiliated to the Faculty of Technology, University of Delhi. The institute initiated PhD programs in 1989 and formulated several PG programs, four of which were approved by the AICTE in 1994. The institute was renamed Netaji Subash Institute of Technology (NSIT) in honour of the Indian freedom fighter Subhas Chandra Bose in 1997. The Delhi Netaji Subhas University of Technology Act, 2017 (Delhi Act 06 of 2018) upgraded the institute under the affiliation of the Faculty of Technology, University of Delhi, to a non-affiliating state university. Jai Prakash Saini became the founder/ vice-chancellor of Netaji Subhas University of Technology.

== Campus ==
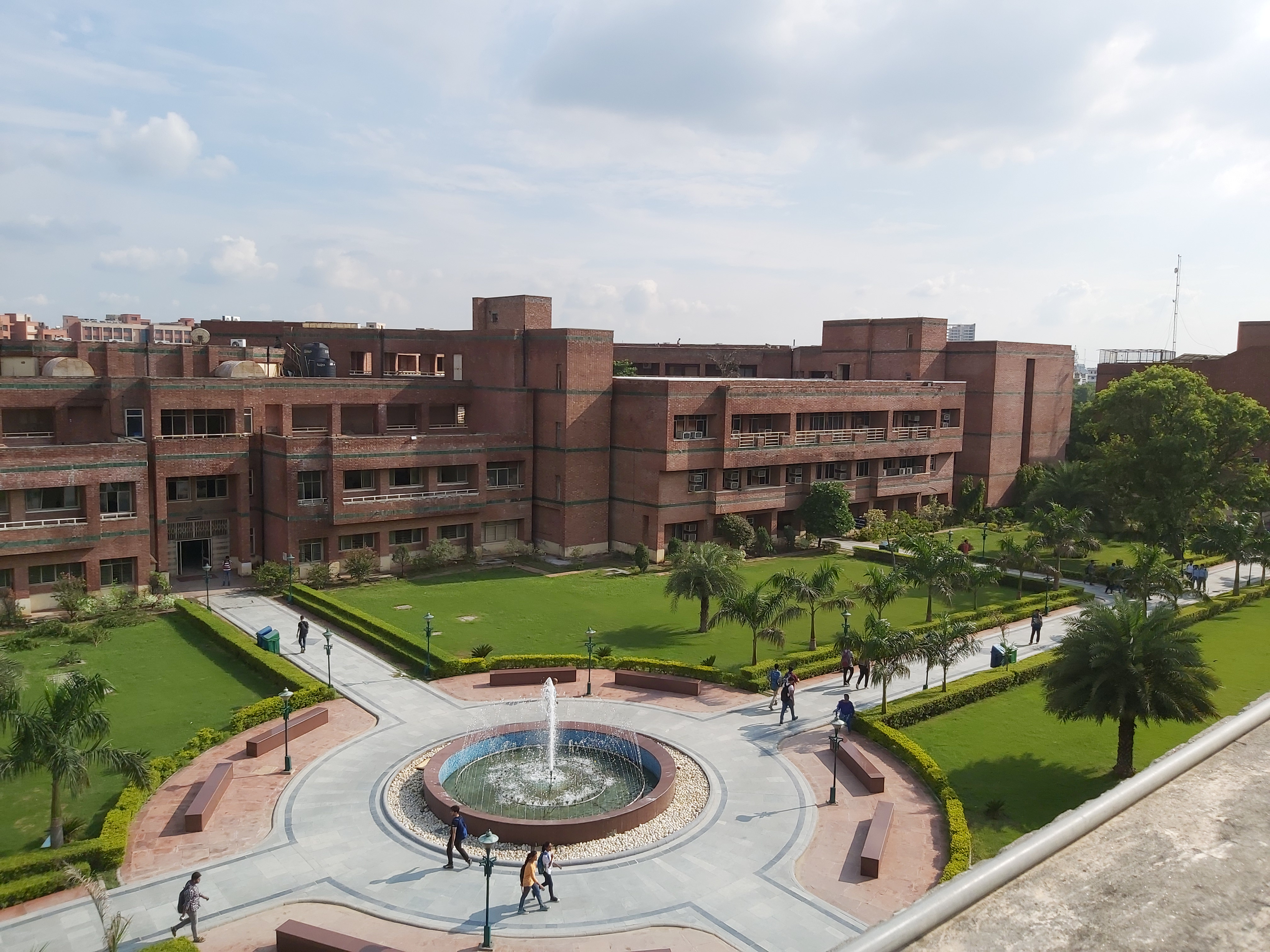
NSUT Campus

=== Main campus ===
The primary campus of NSUT is a fully residential campus on 149.5 acres of land. Campus facilities include faculty and staff housing, student hostels, cooperative mess and a sports complex. The campus is divided into clusters of buildings. The administrative block contains important offices, banks, a post office, and an auditorium where major functions are held. The campus has five boys' hostels (one for each year) and three girls' hostels.

=== East campus ===
The East campus is located in Geeta Colony.

=== West campus ===
The West campus is located in Jaffarpur Kalan.

== Rankings ==
University rankings

Engineering – India
- NIRF (2024): 57

The Netaji Subhas University of Technology was ranked 70 among engineering institutes by the National Institutional Ranking Framework (NIRF) in 2025.

== Notable alumni ==
- Naveen Kasturia, film actor and assistant director
- Nitin Rakesh, Chief Executive Officer and Director of Mphasis
- Ishan Gupta, Founder and CEO at EduKart
- Paavan Nanda, Founder at Zostel, ZO Rooms and WinZO
- Prashasti Singh, stand-up comic, writer
- Prayag Narula, Founder and chairman at LeadGenius
