= Motorcycle taxis in India =

Indian Motorcycle Taxis

Motorcycle taxis in India are a form of taxicab services. They have existed since 1981, when the Government of Goa started issuing permits to operate them.

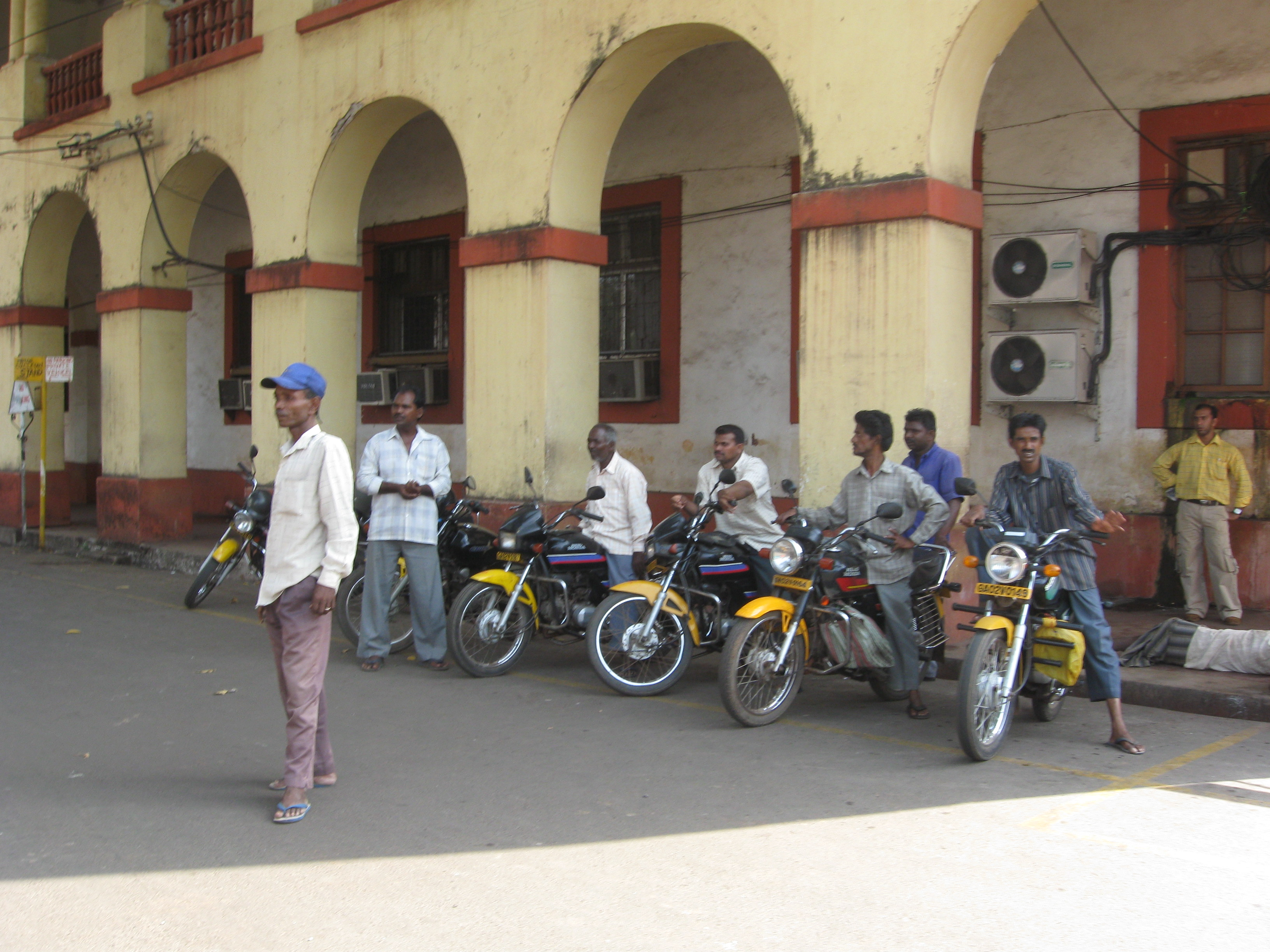
A taxi stand in Goa.

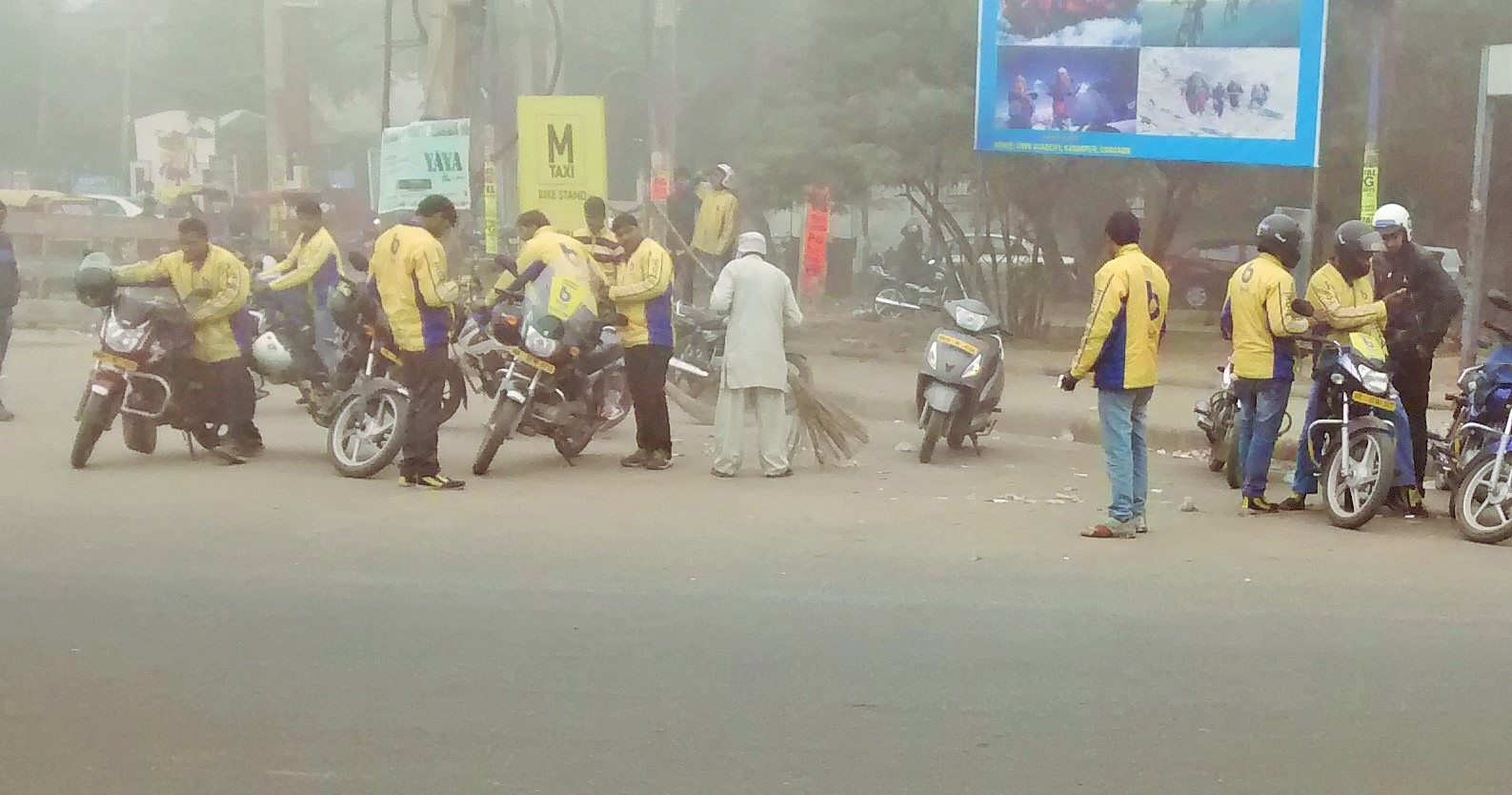
A taxi stand in Gurgaon

== History ==
The Goa Motorcycle Taxi Riders Association (GMTRA) was founded in 1980 to operate motorcycle taxis in the state. Operators are referred to as pilots and operate using yellow coloured motorcycles. They are not regulated by a fare meter.

Eight states in the country permit running of bike taxis. The Central Government created guidelines in 2020 for motor vehicle aggregators, where bike taxis were legitimized. Delhi banned bike taxis in 2023, and Karnataka, which introduced an Electric Bike Taxi Policy in 2021, repealed it in 2024.

Rapido, started in 2015, is an Indian ride-hailing service, which primarily operates as a bike taxi aggregator. It was the biggest bike taxi aggregator in Karnataka, with Ola and Uber as its competitors, before bike taxis were outlawed by the High Court in June 2025.
