= Taish =

2020 Indian film by Bejoy Nambiar

- Film poster
- Directed by: Bejoy Nambiar
- Written by: Kartik R. Iyer; Anjali Nair; Bejoy Nambiar; Gunjit Chopra
- Produced by: Nishant Pitti; Deepak Mukut; Bejoy Nambiar; Shivanshu Pandey; Rikant Pitti
- Starring: Pulkit Samrat; Jim Sarbh; Harshvardhan Rane; Kriti Kharbanda; Sanjeeda Sheikh
- Cinematography: Harshvir Oberai
- Edited by: Priyank Prem Kumar
- Music by: Raghav Sachar; Prashant Pillai; Govind Vasantha; Enbee; Gaurav Godkhindi
- Production companies: EaseMyTrip; Getaway Pictures; Soham Rockstar Entertainment
- Distributed by: ZEE5
- Release date: 29 October 2020
- Running time: 178 minutes (webseries); 143 minutes (film)
- Country: India
- Languages: Hindi; Punjabi

Taish (transl.: Fit of rage) is a 2020 Indian Hindi-language neo-noir action thriller drama film directed by Bejoy Nambiar. The film stars Pulkit Samrat, Jim Sarbh, Harshvardhan Rane, Kriti Kharbanda and Sanjeeda Shaikh. It is produced by Deepak Mukut, Bejoy Nambiar, and Nishant Pitti. The film was released on ZEE5 on 29 October 2020 as a feature film and six episodic series, simultaneously.

== Plot ==
Rohan Kalra (Jim Sarbh), an Indian General Practitioner lives with his girlfriend Aarfa (Kriti Kharbanda), a Pakistani Orthopaedic Surgeon in the UK. Rohan receives an invitation to attend his brother, Krish's (Ankur Rathee) wedding. This creates a tense situation between Aarfa and Rohan, since Aarfa is a Pakistani Muslim and Rohan fears his parents never accepting her. So, he eventually leaves for the wedding by himself. At the wedding, his mother is eager for Rohan to get married as well and forces him to consider some marriage proposals. The atmosphere changes when Sunny Lalwani (Pulkit Samrat), Rohan's best friend, arrives at the wedding. Later that evening, it is revealed that Krish's fiancé, Mahi, had cheated on him with one of her exes, a month before the wedding.

Simultaneously, a crime family head, Kuljinder, marries Jahaan (Sanjeeda) forcibly, who is in love with Kuljinder's younger brother, Pali (Harshvardhan). Pali wants to leave the family and run away with Jahaan. Pali arrives at the wedding and threatens Kuljinder with a gun. Pali gets dragged out of the venue before he could do anything. The marriage infuriates Pali who vows not to kill Kuljinder until Kuljinder fires the first bullet. A few days later, Jahaan escapes home to be with Pali. She later informs him that she's pregnant with his child. Pali decides to run away with Jahaan and start a new life. However, his dreams are shattered after Jahaan's sister, Sanober, discovers the truth and forces Jahaan to abort her pregnancy.

The two families meet after Sunny discovers that Rohan's childhood molester is Rohan's father's friend, Kuljinder. Sunny beats Kuljinder badly, paralysing him forever and damaging his vocal cords such that he can't speak. When this news reaches Kuljinder's family, they blame Pali because of his earlier threat to Kuljinder. To prove his innocence, Pali vows to avenge his brother, resulting in Sunny and Krish being kidnapped at Krish's wedding where Krish is killed, and Sunny badly injured. Pali and Sukhi (Saurabh Sachdeva), his best friend, are arrested after Rohan and his family file a case against them. Pali is jailed, and Rohan moves to somewhere remote after blaming Sunny for Krish's death.

Two years pass by and Rohan is contacted by Sunny's sister through Aarfa, who informs him of Sunny's disappearance. It turns out that Sunny is in the same jail as Pali to exact revenge for Krish's death. Here we learn that one year after Krish's death, his fiancée Mahi committed suicide in Bristol leading to Sunny taking this step. Rohan along with Aarfa and Shozi gets him out of jail before he commits the murder. It is revealed that Kuljinder's business is now run by his wife Sanober and Pali from jail who has learnt of Sunny's plan to kill him. Meanwhile, Rohan and Aarfa patch things up and get engaged.

At Rohan's residence he and Aarfa along with Sunny's sister get attacked by Sukhi, who asks them for Sunny's location. After a brief argument, Sunny's sister is held at knifepoint so Rohan is forced to tell him about Sunny's whereabouts. They later escape and save him. Sunny threatens Pali that he is going to kill his younger brother Jassi. Later Sunny and Rohan go to a bar where Sunny gets drunk and shoots Jassi. Watching his brother's dead body, Pali swears revenge and plans to get out of jail by staging an injury. Rohan then decides to directly confront Pali and get things over, Pali is shocked to know about Kuljinder's deeds and confirms the same with Sanober. He escapes on the way to hospital and along with Sukhi goes to his home where he asks Jahaan to run away with him.

The final episode ends with a chase sequence between the two duos, Sunny-Rohan and Pali-Sukhi. This ends in a crash, where Pali gets into an accident and Sukhi is killed instantly. Sunny and Rohan fight Pali together who is weak due to his accident. They manage to bring him down but Sunny is shot by Pali, and dies in Rohan's arms while he tries to help. The series ends with a clip of Jahaan waiting for Pali at an airport.

== Cast ==
- Pulkit Samrat as Sunny Lalwani
- Jim Sarbh as Rohan Kalra, Sunny's childhood friend
- Harshvardhan Rane as Pali Brar
- Kriti Kharbanda as Aarfa Khan, Rohan's love interest
- Ankur Rathee as Krish Kalra, Rohan's brother
- Zoa Morani as Mahi, Krish's fiancé
- Sanjeeda Sheikh as Jahaan Brar, Pali's love interest, Sanober's sister
- Melissa Raju Thomas as Simmi, Sunny's love interest (cameo appearance)
- Saurabh Sachdeva as Sukhi
- Abhimanyu Singh as Kuljinder "Kulli" Brar, Pali and Jassi's brother
- Viraf Patel as Shozi
- Armaan Khera as Jassi Brar, Pali's brother
- Saloni Batra as Sanober Brar, Kulli's wife
- Kunickaa Sadanand as Beeji
- Ikhlaque Khan as Rohan's father
- Mohnisha Haseen as Rohan's mother
- Mahavir Bhullar as Sarpanch Saab
- Shivanshu Pandey as Ismail
- Ekansh Kumar Sharma as Sattu, Sanober and Jahaan's brother

== Soundtrack ==
Taish

Soundtrack album by Raghav Sachar, Prashant Pillai, Govind Vasantha, Enbee and Gaurav Godkhindi
- Released: 20 October 2020
- Recorded: 2019
- Genre: Feature film soundtrack
- Length: 32:52
- Language: Hindi
- Label: Zee Music Company

Official audio
- Taish - Full Album on YouTube

The film's music was composed by Raghav Sachar, Prashant Pillai, Govind Vasantha, Embee and Gaurav Godkhindi, while lyrics were written by Rohit Sharma, Hussain Haidry, Armaan Khera and Embee.

Track listing
No.	Title	Lyrics	Music	Singer(s)	Length
1.	"Kol Kol"	Rohit Sharma	Raghav Sachar	Jyotica Tangri	3:36
2.	"Roshni Si"	Hussain Haidry	Prashant Pillai	Ashwin Gopakumar, Preeti Pillai	3:18
3.	"Re Bawree"	Hussain Haidry	Govind Vasantha	Prarthana Indrajith, Govind Vasantha	5:00
4.	"Shehnaiyan Wajan Do"	Enbee	Enbee	Enbee, Raahi	3:45
5.	"Rage Infinity"	Instrumental	Gaurav Godkhindi	Instrumental	1:43
6.	"Re Bawree" (Jahaan Lost In Love)	Hussain Haidry	Govind Vasantha	Sona Mohapatra	4:57
7.	"Kol Kol" (Reprise)	Rohit Sharma	Raghav Sachar	Mohan Kannan	3:39
8.	"All I See Is The" (Roshni Si - Reprise)	Hussain Haidry, Armaan Khera	Prashant Pillai	Preeti Pillai, Armaan Khera	3:20
9.	"Kol Kol Mix"	Instrumental	Raghav Sachar	Instrumental	3:34
Total length:					32:52

== Critical reception ==
Anna MM Vetticad from Firstpost rated Taish 3.25 out of 5 and stated "Taish the series is fair enough, but it is the film that manages to effectively convey the wrath and passion of the title, making it Nambiar’s best work yet". Shubhra Gupta from The Indian Express wrote "The web series goes back and forth in time, and then leaps to the present, leading to some amount of confusion. And then there is Nambiar’s old nemesis, the lack of substance which you end up missing in all the style".

Pallabi Dey Purkayastha from The Times Of India wrote " Taish is timely, stylish and has an important life lesson to impart – that revenge is never the answer and rage triggers rage – but the execution and storytelling technique should have been much tighter, and with a climax that would have taken the viewers by total surprise".

Adithya Narayan Taish from The Hindu reviewed "Taish’s failure lies in its inability to exploit one of the luxuries afforded by the medium: scope for character development. Scroll.in stated Taish always looks poised to say something deep and memorable about the need to process old wounds and think before you act. It’s often loud and unwieldy, but it’s flashy and good-looking too in its own way".
