= Cityflo =

Bus service company in Maharashtra, India

- Trade name: Komorebi Tech Solutions
- Company type: Private
- Industry: Transportation
- Founded: 2015; 11 years ago
- Headquarters: Thane, Maharashtra, India
- Area served: Mumbai, Thane, Hyderabad, and Kolkata
- Services: Urban Mobility
- Website: www.cityflo.com

Cityflo is an app-based bus service company headquartered in Thane, Maharashtra, India. Founded in 2015, the company operates in the shared mobility sector, providing daily office commute services for corporate professionals in Mumbai, Hyderabad, Kolkata, and Delhi.

== History ==
Cityflo was founded in May 2015 by IIT Bombay graduates Jerin Venad, Rushabh Shah, Ankit Agrawal and Sankalp Kelshikar with Jerin Venad as the company’s CEO.

Cityflo faced operational challenges during the COVID-19 pandemic.

In May 2025, Komorebi Tech Solutions, the parent company of Cityflo, announced a joint venture with Globus Trans Solutions LLP to operate 500 electric buses in the state government-run bus transit ecosystem under the brand name Urban Glide. The company has also announced that it will expand its services in Delhi in 2025. In July 2025, Cityflo partnered with Aaveg to launch an electric bus fleet in Delhi NCR.

== Funding ==
In 2015, after the launch, Cityflo raised seed funding of $750K from IDG Ventures. In 2019, the company secured ₹3 crore (approximately $405,000) from India Quotient and other angel investors.

In November 2020, Cityflo raised ₹57 crore (approximately $8 million) in Series A funding led by Lightbox Ventures along with its existing investors.

== See also ==
- Ibibo – Online travel organisation, subsidiary of MakeMyTrip Limited
- RedBus.in
- Shuttl
