= HackerEarth =

American software company

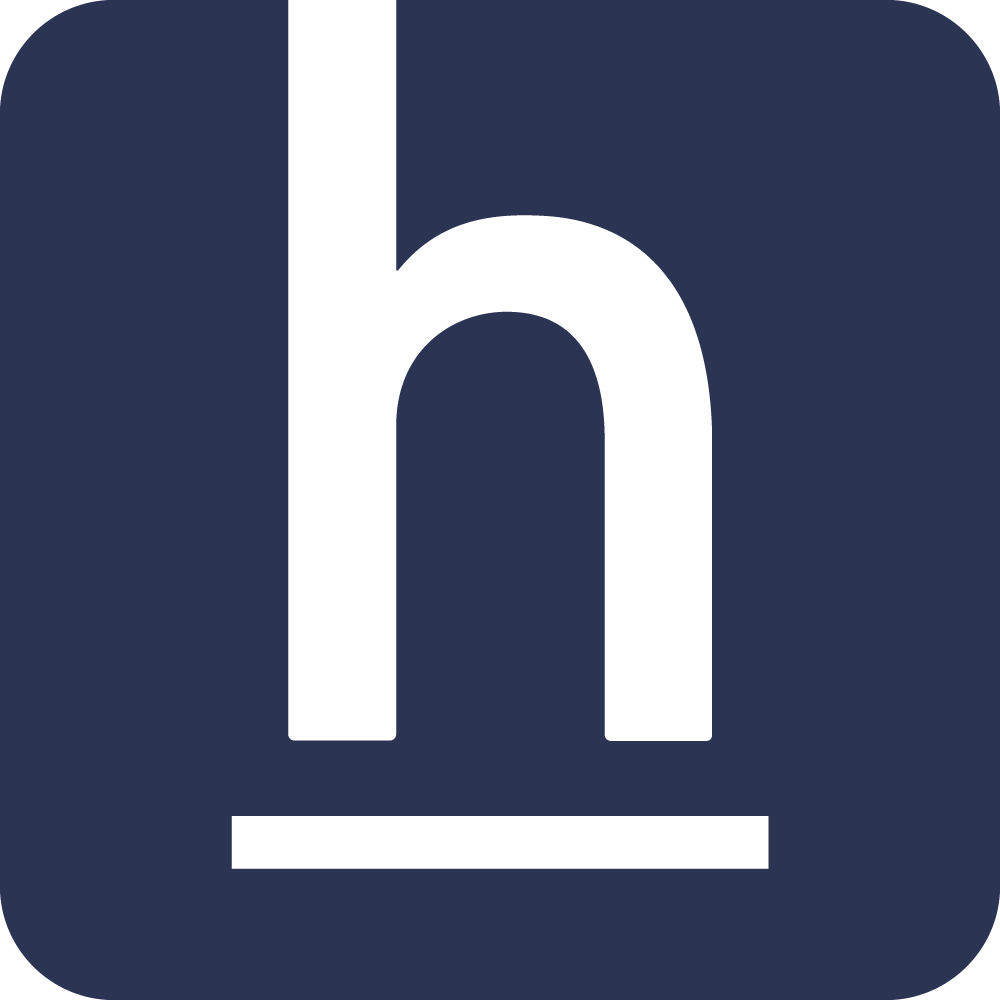
- Industry: Software
- Founded: November 2012
- Founders: Sachin Gupta; Vivek Prakash
- Headquarters: San Francisco, California, USA
- Products: HackerEarth for Developers; HackerEarth Assessments
- Website: hackerearth.com

HackerEarth is a software company headquartered in San Francisco that provides enterprise software that assists organizations with technical hiring. HackerEarth is used by organizations for technical skill assessments and remote video interviewing. In addition, HackerEarth also has a community of over 4 million developers. HackerEarth has raised $11.5 million in funding over three rounds. Customers worldwide use its technical coding assessments platform, including Amazon, Paypal, Walmart Labs, Thoughtworks, Societe Generale, HP, VMware, DBS, HCL, GE, Wipro, Barclays, Pitney Bowes, Intel, Hitachi, and L&T Infotech. HackerEarth is backed by GSF Global and Angelprime.

== History ==
=== Early years ===
Founded in November 2012 by Indian Institute of Technology Roorkee alumni Sachin Gupta and Vivek Prakash, HackerEarth began as MyCareerStack, a social interactive platform geared toward technical interviews. Initially, the learning platform was aimed at leveling the playing field for technical interviews for campus students with tutorials on concepts in programming, blogs, interview questions, an online code editor, and a discussion forum.

Later, Sachin and Vivek pivoted the idea to creating an automated technical assessment software product and launched it in February 2013. Two years later, HackerEarth launched its innovation management software and an upgraded version was released in early 2018.

=== Growth and funding ===
The start-up was part of the first batch of GSF Accelerator in 2012, and it later secured $500,000 from early-stage investor Prime Ventures. The Bangalore and California-based company raised $4.5 million in a Series A round funding led by DHI Group Inc. with participation from Prime Ventures and Beenext in February 2017. In December 2018, HackerEarth secured the next round of funding. The Jo Hirao Office led the Series B funding for a total value of $6.5 million.

HackerEarth raised a total of $11,500,000 in funding over three rounds.

The company is headquartered in San Francisco, California.

== Products and services ==
=== HackerEarth Assessments ===
HackerEarth Assessments is an ISO certified coding assessment platform that helps organizations hire developers using automated technical coding tests. The proprietary tech assessment platform vets technical talent through skill-based evaluation and analytics.

=== Facecode ===
Facecode is HackerEarth's video interview software for hiring developers.

=== Remote hiring solutions ===
HackerEarth helps organizations remotely source, assess, interview, and hire for developer roles worldwide.

=== Contests ===
HackerEarth Contests include hackathons, programming challenges and coding competitions for developers and companies. One of HackerEarth's hackathon contests in May 2023 attracted significant press attention in Korea after the top three places were won by students from North Korean universities Kim Chaek University of Technology and Kim Il Sung University.

=== Practice ===
HackerEarth Practice offers programming tutorials and practice problems for developers on topics such as data structures, algorithms, math, Python, and machine learning.

=== HackerEarth Student Ambassador ===
The HackerEarth University Ambassador Program is a platform for students to run programming clubs in their universities.

== See also ==
- Devpost
