= Keka =

Keka or KEKA may refer to:

- Keka-class patrol boat
- Keka Ferdousi (born 1960), Bangladeshi television chef and writer
- KEKA-FM, an American radio station
- Murray Field (ICAO code:KEKA), an airport in the United States
- Keka HR, an Indian HR software company
- Keka (2008 film), an Indian Telugu-language romantic drama film
- Keka (2003 film), a Philippine film directed by Quark Henares
