= Shuttl =

Indian commute bus aggregator app

- Trade name: Super Highway Labs Private Limited
- Company type: Private
- Industry: Transportation
- Founded: 2015
- Founder: Amit Singh and Deepanshu Malviy
- Headquarters: Gurugram, India
- Area served: India
- Key people: Deepanshu Malviya, Amit Singh
- Products: Mobile app
- Services: Urban Mobility
- Revenue: ₹100 crore (2019)
- Website: ride.shuttl.com

Shuttl is a mobile app based office commute bus aggregator based out of Gurugram, India. The company was founded in 2015. It operates in more than 6 metro cities across the country.

== History ==
The company was founded by Amit Singh and Deepanshu Malviya. Shuttl began intra-city bus fleet operations in 2015 within Delhi-NCR.

In 2019, the company clocked ₹100 crore in revenues in FY 2019.

In 2021, the company was acquired by Chalo in an all-cash transaction.

== Funding ==
Shuttl raised its first round of funding in 2015 and has since then attracted several marquee investors including Sequoia, Lightspeed, Times Internet, Amazon India, Toyota Tsusho among others. In November 2019, Shuttl raised $36 million in funding from Toyota Tsusho Corporate and SPARX Group, through its Mirai Creation Fund II, as well as some unnamed investors.

In 2020, Shuttl raised ₹23.87 crore in Series C funding round led by Sojitz Corporation with participation from Compound Partners LLC.

== Awards ==
In June 2018, Shuttl was felicitated in the sustainable mobility category at the International Ashden Awards held in London.

Earlier, in November 2017, in the FICCI Road Safety Awards, the firm had won the Special Jury Award in the category of Road Safety Product and Solution.

== See also ==
- MakeMyTrip
- RedBus.in
- Ridlr
- Cityflo
