= PayU =

Dutch fintech

- Type: Private
- Industry: Fintech
- Founded: 2002; 24 years ago
- Founder: Jose Velez, Martin Schrimpff, Arjan Bakker, Grzegorz Brochocki, Nitin Gupta, Shailaz Nag, and Narendra Nandal
- Headquarters: Hoofddorp, Netherlands
- Number of locations: 17
- Key people: Anirban Mukherjee (CEO)
- Services: Payment gateway
- Number of employees: 1,500
- Parent: Naspers (via Prosus)
- Website: corporate.payu.com

PayU is a Dutch payment service provider to online merchants. The company was founded in 2002, and is headquartered in Hoofddorp.

It allows online businesses to accept and process payments through payment methods that can be integrated with web and mobile applications. As of 2018, the service is available in 17 countries.

PayU is owned by major South African corporation Naspers, which also owns a stake in one of its sister companies, Tencent.

== History ==
PayU is the result of multiple payment gateways in various regions of the world that have been acquired and brought into the PayU group. In 2014, all online payment companies that were part of Naspers started operating under the PayU brand.

In 2022, it fired about 150 employees, approximately 6% of its workforce.

In 2023, PayU sold its global payments business, other than those in its core markets of India, Southeast Asia and Turkey, to Rapyd for $610 million.

== Investment and acquisitions ==
- Acquired Zooz, an Israeli startup that provides an API to merchants.
- Acquired Indian payments services provider, Citrus Pay in September 2016 for $130M.
- Investment of €110M in German fintech company Kreditech, which provides machine-learning-based underwriting.
- PayU led a $115M funding round of Seattle-based Remitly, a remittance company.
- Series A investment of $3.7M in ZestMoney, a provider of consumer finance for online purchases.
- Invested $5.3M in Indian fintech startup PaySense in May 2017
- Investment of R$60M in online credit platform Creditas (ex-BankFacil)
- 2011, acquired Romanian online payments company GECAD ePayments
- 2019, acquired US-based digital financial security firm Wibmo for $70M
- 2019, acquired Turkish digital payments company Iyzico for $165M
- 2020, acquired Indian fintech startup PaySense for $185M
- 2025, PayU acquires 43.5% stake in Mumbai-based Mindgate Solutions.

== Operations ==
=== Europe ===
In November 2006, PayU SA was established and the Polish firm Platnosci.pl was merged into the group. The company also has a partnership with Iwoca to make financing for SME firms easier. In 2010, the company expanded to the Czech Republic. In 2011, the company expanded to Romania. In 2012, it began its operations in Russia, Ukraine, Turkey, Slovakia and Hungary.

=== Latin America ===
In 2002, Pagosonline was founded in Colombia by Jose Velez, Martin Schrimpff and Santiago Spinel.

In 2010, PagosOnline sold a majority stake to Buscapé, which was a part of the Naspers Group. In 2011, Naspers acquired the majority stake in DineroMail. In 2013, Naspers acquired the rest of the shares of DineroMail. In 2012, Naspers acquired Pagosonline, replacing the former two with a new payment platform that eventually was rebranded PayU Latam, which begun operations in Panama and Peru. During the course of 2013 and 2014, PayU Latam and DineroMail merged. In 2016, Bcash and PayU, were merged under the PayU brand in Brazil.

=== Africa ===
PayJar was founded in South Africa in 2010, as part of the Naspers group to help other Naspers companies process online payments. In 2011, PayJar was rebranded to PayU. In 2015, PayU expanded its operations to Nigeria.

=== India ===
In 2011, Ibibo in conjunction with co-founders Nitin Gupta, Narendra Nandal and Shailaz Nag, rolled out a payment gateway, PayU, in the Indian market to permit websites to integrate e-commerce transactions through online payments. A lawsuit filed against the company in February 2026 by domestic competitor RazorPay alleging that PayU's advertisement campaign in the country imitated RazorPay's IPL 2025 advertisements resulted in a declination to grant interim injunction by the Delhi High Court.

== Products and services ==
PayU is a regulated financial institution. It holds licenses from central banks and local regulators. PayU's products include a PCI-DSS certified payment gateway, an anti-fraud system and an online Visa/MasterCard acquirer.

== See also ==
- List of online payment service providers
