= Deep Kalra =

Indian businessman

- Born: Hyderabad, India
- Citizenship: Indian
- Education: St Stephen's College, Delhi; Delhi University; IIM Ahmedabad
- Occupation: Businessman
- Known for: Founder and CEO of MakeMyTrip

Deep Kalra is an Indian businessman who is the Founder & Chairman of MakeMyTrip, an Indian online travel company.

He was born in Hyderabad and grew up in Delhi and Ahmedabad.

== Education and career ==
He obtained his bachelor's degree in Economics from St. Stephen's College, Delhi of Delhi University in 1990 and his MBA from Indian Institute of Management Ahmedabad in 1992.

Kalra joined ABN AMRO after graduation from IIM Ahmedabad where he worked for three years. He worked with AMF Bowling to set up bowling alleys in India before joining GE Capital in 1999 as VP of Business Development. He started MakeMyTrip in the year 2000 after realising the possibilities of the internet while trying to sell his wife's car online. Since August 2013, he functions as Group CEO. In 2022, he was elevated to the position of group chairman and chief mentor helping the company pursue product innovation and expansion. He is one of the founders of Ashoka University and is a part of its governing body. He is also a founding member of I am Gurgaon, an NGO.

Deep is the creator of a number of other prosperous travel and technology firms. Deep is the head of the NASSCOM internet working group and one of the organization's executive members.

== Recognition ==
He was ranked #1 in a list of most powerful digital influencers in India by KPMG in 2011.

In 2026, MakeMyTrip faced renewed regulatory scrutiny when allegations emerged that the company had circumvented a 2022 Competition Commission of India ruling through a rebranded pricing mechanism, with a CCI appeal hearing scheduled for April 29, 2026. Kalra, serving as Group Chairman and Chief Mentor, continued to provide strategic oversight of the company's policy and regulatory affairs.
