= Hopper (company) =

Online travel marketplace

- Type: Private
- Industry: Travel
- Founded: 2007; 19 years ago
- Founders: Frederic Lalonde; Joost Ouwerkerk; Dakota Smith
- Headquarters: Montreal, Canada
- Area served: Worldwide
- Key people: Frederic Lalonde (CEO) Joost Ouwerkerk (CTO)
- Products: Hopper App; HTS (Hopper Technology Solutions)
- Revenue: ▲US$850 million (2024)
- Number of employees: 1,200 (2023)
- Website: hopper.com

Hopper, Inc. is a travel technology company that operates consumer platforms, including the Hopper app and website, and supports partner-branded channels through its business-to-business division, HTS (Hopper Technology Solutions). The company is headquartered in Montreal, Canada, with a major U.S. office in Boston, Massachusetts.

== History ==
Hopper was founded in April 2007 by Frederic Lalonde and Joost Ouwerker'k, both of whom were executives at Expedia Group. It started as a planning tool for travel destinations and activities.

In 2012, Dakota Smith joined and the company received $12 million in Series B funding from investment funds such as OMERS and Atlas Venture.

In January 2014, Hopper was launched. During the development phase, Hopper developed technology that crawled two billion web pages for travel-related information and added it to a database. In April 2014, a New York Times article described how Hopper's online research reports could help travelers cut their travel costs. Hopper shifted its business model in May 2014 to focus on using big data to optimize the ways travelers could choose where to fly and when to buy tickets.

In January 2015, an app was launched with functions such as flight price prediction and real-time price monitoring.

In March 2016, $62 million was received in funding to improve its airfare prediction algorithm. A year later, the company expanded its platform by adding a hotel booking service.

In October 2018, the company received an investment of $100 million to expand its services internationally.

In late 2019, the company added fintech-based functions designed to help users optimize their travel costs. In the same year, Hopper launched a sustainability initiative called Hopper Trees. Hopper funds tree planting for every travel booking made through the company, aiming to offset carbon dioxide emissions. To facilitate this, Hopper has partnered with nonprofit organizations, including Eden Reforestation Projects, which began in 2019, and Veritree, in 2023.

In March 2021, the company became a unicorn after receiving an investment of $170 million from Capital One. In August 2021, it raised an additional $175 million in a series G funding round led by GPI Capital.

In January 2022, Hopper Homes was launched to provide short-term house rentals. A month later, in February 2022, the company was valued at $5 billion after a $35 million secondary share sale. It received $96 million in additional investment from Capital One in November 2022.

=== Acquisition history ===
In late 2019, Hopper acquired a Colombian travel company, GDX Travel.

In October 2021, the company bought PlacePass, a Boston-based online booking service. In the same year, Hopper took control of a trip-planning service, Journy.

In February 2022, a Paris-based merchandising services provider, Smooss, was acquired.

== Technology and applications ==
Hopper uses machine learning algorithms to dynamically change the price of its fintech offers, which are designed to provide flexibility for users. Its price-forecasting algorithm, which uses historical data to predict flight's price, was designed in 2010 in Cambridge, Massachusetts.

Hopper applies its technology to give users additional fintech functions based on historical data, including "price freezing to protect against pricing volatility", "cancelling or changing flight bookings at short notice", or if a flight is delayed for any reason, changing it without overcharging.

== HTS (Hopper Technology Solutions) ==
In 2021, Hopper launched HTS (Hopper Technology Solutions), a business-to-business division designed to license the company's AI, travel-commerce and fintech tools. Through HTS, Hopper provides white-label booking platforms and fintech products to third-party enterprises, including banks, airlines, and travel service providers.

Following its establishment, HTS entered into agreements with various companies. Notable early clients included Capital One, where HTS developed its travel booking portal, Capital One Travel. Other notable early clients included Uber (United Kingdom), Air Canada, which adopted HTS' "Cancel for Any Reason", and Tripadvisor, which integrated HTS for hotel bookings within its mobile app. HTS also expanded its presence in the financial sector through partnerships with banking institutions such as the Commonwealth Bank (Australia) Nubank in Latin America, and Lloyds Bank in the UK.

By 2023, additional collaborations with airlines were reported, including Virgin Australia, which implemented "HTS Stays" for accommodation bookings, and Frontier Airlines, which adopted HTS to power its "Disruption Assistance for Any Reason" option.

== Deceptive marketing ==
In May 2018, Hopper came under fire for its Secret Fares feature, which claimed to offer flight seats at a discount of 35%. It claimed that it had exclusive access to such seats from certain airlines. However, Air Canada and WestJet both broke ties with the company, claiming that it had falsely marketed the fares as exclusive. Hopper eventually closed the program.

In July 2026, Hopper agreed to pay US$35 million to settle FTC allegations of charging fees without consent and deceiving users about fees and benefits of some its products. TechCrunch reported it as another case of regulator's crackdown on online portals using dark patterns.

== See also ==
- Online marketplace
- Skyscanner
- Airbnb
