= BluSmart =

Indian electric cab company

BluSmart Mobility
- Company type: Private
- Industry: Automotive; Electric vehicles
- Founded: January 2019; 7 years ago
- Founder: Anmol Singh Jaggi; Punit K Goyal; Puneet Singh Jaggi
- Defunct: 2025
- Fate: Alleged financial mismanagement
- Headquarters: Gurugram, Haryana, India
- Area served: India, Dubai
- Services: Electric cab
- Website: www.blu-smart.com

BluSmart Mobility was an Indian ride-sharing company, headquartered in Gurugram. It was founded by Anmol Singh Jaggi, Punit K Goyal and Puneet Singh Jaggi in 2019.

The company's fleet of vehicles included the Mahindra e-Verito, Tata e-Tigor, Tata Xpres-T EV, Hyundai Kona Electric, MG ZS Electric, and Citroen e-C3. It was India's first all-electric shared smart mobility platform.

The company competed with Uber, Ola, and new cab-hailing entrants like Rapido and Namma Yatri.

It shut down operations in April 2025.

== History ==
BluSmart was co-founded on 14 January 2019 by Anmol Singh Jaggi, Puneet Singh Jaggi, and Punit K Goyal. In the same month, BluSmart partnered with Mahindra & Mahindra to launch the first batch of EVs on the platform. In September 2019, the company, led by JITO Angel Network, Investment Office of Deepika Padukone, raised an angel round of US$3 million.

On World EV Day 2021, BluSmart announced a partnership with Jio-BP to set up charging infrastructure across India.

On World Environment Day 2022, Tata Motors signed an MoU with BluSmart to deliver 10,000 EVs. In July 2022, BluSmart received Verra accreditation on carbon emissions.

In February 2024, BluSmart partnered with Tata Power to source clean energy for its electric vehicle charging infrastructure.

In July 2024, the company raised $24 million (₹200 crore) in a funding round led by its existing investors, Zurich-based climate finance firm Responsability Investments, cricketer MS Dhoni's family office, and ReNew founder Sumant Sinha.

On 15 April 2025, the Securities and Exchange Board of India (SEBI) barred the company's promoters, Anmol Singh Jaggi and Puneet Singh Jaggi, from holding directorships in the group's listed company Gensol Engineering Limited and from accessing public markets. SEBI's investigation revealed that funds from Gensol's term loans worth ₹977 crore (US$100 million) raised from IREDA and Power Finance between 2021 and 2024–intended primarily for leasing 6,400 EVs to BluSmart–had been diverted and misappropriated by the Jaggi brothers. According to SEBI, only ₹567 crore (US$59 million) was used for purchase of 4,704 EVs, while funds of at least ₹400 crore (US$42 million) were either unaccounted for or siphoned off by the promoters. SEBI also flagged various personal expenditures made using the diverted funds, including the purchase of a luxury flat. SEBI's order came weeks after BluSmart defaulted on bond payments, and Anmol Singh Jaggi emailed BluSmart employees regarding the non-payment of salaries citing financial constraints.

On 17 April 2025, BluSmart suspended all ride bookings and extended the refund window for user wallet balances from 6 days to 90 days. The company is now essentially defunct.

== Business model ==
BluSmart functioned on an asset-light business model. Cars were procured on a monthly lease from companies like EESL. The company's app was used to purchase rides, similarly to Uber, Ola Cabs and Lyft. The company used all-electric cars with their branding on it.

== Services ==
BluSmart operated in parts of Delhi NCR, Bangalore, Mumbai, and Dubai. Users could book a cab using the Android or iOS app. In June 2020, BluSmart introduced multi-hour rentals.

In April 2021, BluSmart initiated a COVID-19 vaccination drive for its drivers, whose vaccination status was visible on the BluSmart mobile app.

BluSmart also launched EV intercity rides from Delhi NCR to Chandigarh, Jaipur.

== Challenges in growth ==
Unlike its competitors, BluSmart's expansion faced several hindrances. Because BluSmart operated on a hub-to-hub model, the lack of charging infrastructure in India and range anxiety of EVs posed serious hurdles to the company's growth. Because their cars were not driver-owned assets, high maintenance costs were thought to further complicate its scaling-up process.
