= Devpost =

Software development company

- Company type: Private
- Available in: English
- Founded: 2009
- Founder: Brandon Kessler
- Website: devpost.com
- Commercial: Yes

Devpost (formerly ChallengePost) is a platform that helps software engineers participate in software competitions (hackathons). Customers market their developer tools and jobs to the Devpost community. The company was founded by Brandon Kessler in 2009.

== Origin ==
In 2006, Colin Nederkoorn initiated a public contest prompting programmers to develop a means for running the Windows XP operating system through an Intel Mac. Programmer Jesus Lopez eventually won the competition, which had accumulated over $13,000 in donations. Seeing this competition, Kessler soon developed ChallengePost as a means through which similar competitions could be facilitated and promoted.

At first, the company allowed any individual or organization to post a competition. Over time, their scope evolved. In 2015, ChallengePost changed its name to Devpost and focused exclusively on helping software engineers participate in hackathons, and eventually to find jobs.

== Funding ==
In August 2011, ChallengePost raised $4.6 million in Series A funding from investors including former Apple executive Bob Borchers of Opus Capital and Qualcomm founder Irwin Jacobs.

== Hackathons and Jobs ==
Devpost now powers the majority of the world's in-person and online hackathons (software competitions), and helps software engineers find jobs or software companies hire skilled talents, in service of the company's mission "To help developers find fulfilling work." After 2019, the platform saw a surge in online hackathons hosted on the platforms due to the COVID-19 pandemic and its growing importance in tech innovation.

== Notable clients ==
In 2010, ChallengePost was named the official online "challenge platform" of the U.S. federal government, previously overseeing the NYC Big Apps contest in conjunction with the city of New York, as well as Michelle Obama's Apps for Healthy Kids challenge in conjunction with the U.S. Department of Agriculture.

Devpost customers include Google, Amazon, Facebook, Microsoft, IBM, Intel, Cisco, Atlassian, Twitter, and major Web3 companies including Solana, Polkadot, ICP, etc..

== See also ==
- HackerEarth
