= Blank (2019 film) =

2019 Indian Hindi-language action thriller film

- Theatrical release poster
- Directed by: Behzad Khambata
- Screenplay by: Behzad Khambata; Pranav Adarsh
- Dialogues by: Behzad Khambata; Pranav Adarsh; Radhika Anand
- Story by: Behzad Khambata; Pranav Adarsh
- Produced by: & Pictures; Shrikant Bhasi; Nishant Pitti; Tony D'Souza; Vishal Rana
- Starring: Sunny Deol; Karan Kapadia; Ishita Dutta; Karanvir Sharma
- Cinematography: R. Dee
- Edited by: Sanjay Sharma
- Music by: Raghav Sachar; Arko; Sonal Pradhan
- Production company: Echelon Productions
- Release date: 3 May 2019
- Running time: 107 minutes
- Country: India
- Language: Hindi
- Budget: 12 CRORE
- Box office: est. ₹6.41 crore

Blank is a 2019 Indian Hindi-language action thriller film written and directed by Behzad Khambata. The film stars Sunny Deol, Karan Kapadia, Ishita Dutta and Karanvir Sharma. It was jointly produced by Shrikant Bhasi, Nishant Pitti, & Pictures, Tony D'Souza, and Vishal Rana. The film follows a terrorist who plans to bomb Mumbai along with his compatriots. After meeting with an accident, he loses memory of his mission, but an investigating officer refuses to take his word for it, and plans to kill him in an encounter. Blank was Khambata's directorial debut, and was also Karan Kapadia's acting debut.

Sunny Deol did this film only to support Karan Kapadia, who is the son of the late Simple Kapadia, his close friend and costume designer. Similarly, Akshay Kumar, who is Simple Kapadia's sister Dimple's son-in-law, provided support to Karan Kapadia by featuring in a cameo appearance for a film’s song.

The principal photography for the film began in September 2018. The soundtrack was composed by Raghav Sachar, Arko Pravo Mukherjee, and Sonal Pradhaan, with lyrics written by Arko Pravo Mukherjee, Adeip Singh, Kumaar and Sonal Pradhaan, and released under the banner Zee Music Company. The film was theatrically released in India on 3 May 2019. Blank received mostly mixed to negative reviews from critics, and has grossed over ₹6.41 crore in worldwide.

== Plot ==
Hanif (Karan Kapadia), a member of the terrorist organisation Tehreer Al-Hind, arrives in Mumbai with his team to execute 24 bomb blasts, each by a terrorist. On the day of the attack, he is injured in a road accident and taken to the hospital. Upon realizing that a time bomb is attached to his body, the hospital staff notify SS Dewan (Sunny Deol), a member of the Anti-Terrorism Squad. The doctors find it impossible to remove the bomb from Hanif's body as it is connected directly to his heart.

Hanif regains consciousness but has developed retrograde amnesia following the accident. However, Dewan refuses to trust him and believes he is lying. Meanwhile, Husna (Ishita Dutta) and Rohit (Karanvir Sharma), Dewan's subordinates, arrest another terrorist named Farukh. Aruna Gupta, Dewan's superior, orders him to kill Hanif as the information they need can be obtained from Farukh. Dewan, accompanied by a squad, takes Hanif to an isolated place to kill him in an encounter.

Husna, who has recovered the bomb's blueprint from Hanif's house, realizes that Hanif's death will trigger the explosion of the other 24 bombs. When Hanif is about to be killed, a gang of terrorists attack the officers. The former escape following a car chase and take Hanif to a secret basement. Hanif meets Maqsood (Jameel Khan), his leader, who tells him that he his parents were murdered in communal riots. Dewan and his squad capture Hanif again and kills all other terrorists, including Maqsood. Hanif escapes.

It is revealed that Husna was the mole in Dewan's squad who helped Hanif escape. Hanif and Husna are revealed to be siblings whose parents were murdered by Maqsood years ago in a communal riot. Hanif removes his chest bomb and throws it into a compartment on a train that housed all the suicide bombers, killing them. Hanif reveals to Dewan via phone that he had no memory loss and behaved so to kill Maqsood, who had killed his parents and turned him into a terrorist. Hanif hangs up and destroys the phone, and Dewan promises to catch Hanif and Husna for their betrayal.

The film ends with the song 'Ali Ali' featuring Akshay Kumar in a guest appearance.

== Cast ==
- Sunny Deol as S. S. Dewan – Anti-Terrorism Squad officer
- Karan Kapadia as Hanif
- Ishita Dutta as Husna
- Karanvir Sharma as Rohit
- Ashfaq Abidi as Mr. Mehra – CBI Offer
- Jameel Khan as Maqsood
- Pratyaksh Rajbhatt as Raunak Dewan
- Hemant Choudhary as Doctor
- Akshay Kumar (special appearance) as Dancer – In the song "Ali Ali"
- Boloram Das as Farooq
- Shaji Choudhary as Basheer – A terrorist

== Production ==
In September 2018, Behzad Khambata announced his directorial debut via a post on Facebook. The film was to be titled Blank and would star Sunny Deol and Karan Kapadia. Principal photography began shortly after the announcement. Blank is also the film debut of Kapadia, who is the nephew of actress Dimple Kapadia. Akshay Kumar, who is Kapadia's brother-in-law, features in a song. While filming a sequence that required Kapadia to be handcuffed, the keys to the cuffs were lost and Kapadia had to remain in the position for two hours.

== Music and soundtrack ==
Blank

Soundtrack album by Raghav Sachar, Arko and Sonal Pradhaan
- Released: 19 April 2019
- Recorded: 2017–2018
- Genre: Feature film soundtrack
- Length: 15:43
- Language: Hindi
- Label: Zee Music Company
External audio
- Audio Jukebox on YouTube

The film’s music was composed by Raghav Sachar, Arko and Sonal Pradhan. The lyrics of the songs were penned by Kumaar, Raghav Sachar, Arko, Sonal Pradhan and Adeip Singh.

Track listing
No.	Title	Lyrics	Music	Singer(s)	Length
1.	"Warning Nahi Dunga"	Kumaar	Raghav Sachar	Amit Mishra	2:26
2.	"Ali Ali"	Arko, Adeip Singh	Arko	B Praak, Arko	3:52
3.	"Ali Ali" (Navraj Hans' Version)	Arko, Adeip Singh	Arko	Navraj Hans	3:56
4.	"Himmat Karja"	Sonal Pradhaan	Sonal Pradhaan	Romy	2:15
5.	"Tujhme Hai Aag Baki"	Sonal Pradhaan	Sonal Pradhaan	Romy	3:14
Total length:					15:43

== Marketing and release ==
In September 2018, a press release stated that Blank would be released in India on 11 January 2019. The release was then indefinitely postponed, and in March 2019, the release was announced to be on 3 May that year. According to the producer Vishal Rana, the release was first postponed as other films with similar themes as Uri: The Surgical Strike were to release around the same time. On 1 April, two teaser posters were released online. The film's trailer was released on 3 April 2019. The Times of India wrote, "This jaw-dropping trailer is nothing but one ride that will give an ample of adrenaline rush". Similarly, The Indian Express opined, "The crisply cut and edited trailer is high on action, thrill and some heavy dose of dialogues".

Shortly before the film's release, Deol joined the Bharatiya Janata Party. Rana maintained that the film was not being released in that time period for any political motive or to gain any publicity, and stated that it was a coincidence. Five days prior to its release, the film was selectively screened at locations across India for test audiences. Kapadia visited one such screening in Delhi for promoting the film. Blank was theatrically released in India on 3 May 2019. Other than Blank, the only other Hindi release that day was the crime thriller Setters.

== Reception ==
=== Critical response ===
Blank received mixed to negative reviews from critics. Devesh Sharma of Filmfare states, "Given its premise, the film had the potential to be an edge-of-the-seat thriller, if only the writing and execution could have been better". He criticised almost all aspects of production, but felt the "only redeeming aspect [was] the action". Writing for The Hindu, Namrata Joshi opines, "Blank eventually doesn't rise above being a stilted "bad Muslim" narrative. It's yet another film that plays on Islamophobia and it does say a lot that it comes with the backing of the BJP candidate from Gurdaspur... and the Canadian journalist specialising in doing non-political interviews[.]" Devansh Sharma of Firstpost gave it two and a quarter stars out of five and felt the film had a "promising start", "[b]ut by the time the close-to-two-hour-long film ends, the urgency gives way to convolution". However, he felt Kapadia "proves to be an immensely watchable leading man, because of his unconventional intensity and the organic ability to pull off action sequences".

Writing for Film Companion, Anupama Chopra appreciated the film's element of surprise but bemoaned the lack of a strong script for "an inherently intriguing idea", stating, "[E]ach time the suspense builds, the logic-free plot deflates it". She felt Kapadia's performance was restricted to being "poker-faced as the character demands but equally ferocious", while commenting that Deol's sequences "are the best part of the film". In a more negative review for Film Companion, Rahul Desai wrote, "Soapy craft and writing aside, the problem lies in the film's facile politics. Given its release in the midst of the country's Lok Sabha Elections, it's not surprising to see a star in service of a statement". Taran Adarsh of Bollywood Hungama gave it two and a half stars out of five, but approached the film more positively, writing, "Blank is well directed and performed and is based on the relatable events of terrorism. Sunny Deol's fans will love him in an action packed role after a long time". Priyanka Sinha Jha of News18 gave the same rating but wrote, "Despite Sunny Deol's presence, the film fails to pack in a punch".

Saibal Chatterjee of NDTV gave the film two stars out of five, writing, "All the spiffiness, sadly, stays on the surface, leaving Blank groping for purpose", and added, "The film is let down by a storyline that strains credulity". Shubhra Gupta of The Indian Express rated it one and a half stars out of five and felt it "emphasizes its over-used thrust - Islamic 'aatankwaad' threatening the unity and integrity of Akhand Bharat"; Gupta felt Kapadia performed well in the action sequences "but will need to work hard on emoting", while Deol was at his usual. Raja Sen of Hindustan Times wrote, "All the bad guys in this film have beards. Sunny Deol does not. He is a good guy, and therefore shortchanged in the facial hair department... Yep, this is that kind of film". Writing for The Times of India, Rachit Gupta concurred, "The movie has flashes of promise but just as many, if not more, moments of amateur execution", and felt Khambata's "inexperience shows in many portions where the filmmaker's choices aren't top-notch".
