= Valitor =

Financial services company in Iceland

Valitor hf.
- Type: Private
- Industry: Electronic Payment Services
- Founded: 1983 (as Visa Iceland)
- Headquarters: Hafnarfjörður, Iceland
- Services: Payment Services, Payment gateway
- Website: www.valitor.com

Valitor is a merchant services, acquirer, card issuer and payment gateway solutions company headquartered in Hafnarfjörður, Iceland. Valitor is Visa's and Mastercard's partner in Iceland and offers various online and e-commerce solutions internationally.

== History ==
Valitor was founded in 1983 by five banks and thirteen savings banks under the name Visa Iceland. In 2007 Greiðslumiðlun hf. changed its name to Valitor in a move to further its international services.

On 7 December 2010, following the leak of the US diplomatic cables in February 2010 and the leak of Afghan War documents in July 2010, Valitor suspended payments towards the data company DataCell, the company processing donations for WikiLeaks. On 12 July 2012 a Reykjavík court ruled that Valitor had to start processing donations within fourteen days on pain of daily fines to the amount of ISK 800,000 for each day after that time, to open the payment gateway. Valitor also had to pay DataCell's litigation costs of ISK 1,500,000.

In 2015, Valitor was selected as one of six companies to service ApplePay in Europe.

In July 2017, Valitor bought UK based Chip & PIN Solutions.

In April 2020, Valitor courted controversy as it was accused of using the COVID-19 pandemic to sack staff. The issue arose when Valitor fired 14 entry level staff at its Glasgow branch, claiming they were “restructuring the business”. However, the company is said to have kept on all its HR and senior management by putting them on furlough.

=== Acquisition by Rapyd ===
Valitor is now part of Rapyd, a global payment processing and fintech-as-a-service company founded in 2016 as a consumer-mode e-wallet called CashDash. It was the first e-wallet launched in 2017 and the company built an API that enables customers to access a range of financial services, including payouts, foreign exchange fund collection, card issuance, fund disbursements, and virtual IBAN accounts, among others.
