= FabHotels =

Indian hotel chain

Fab Hotels
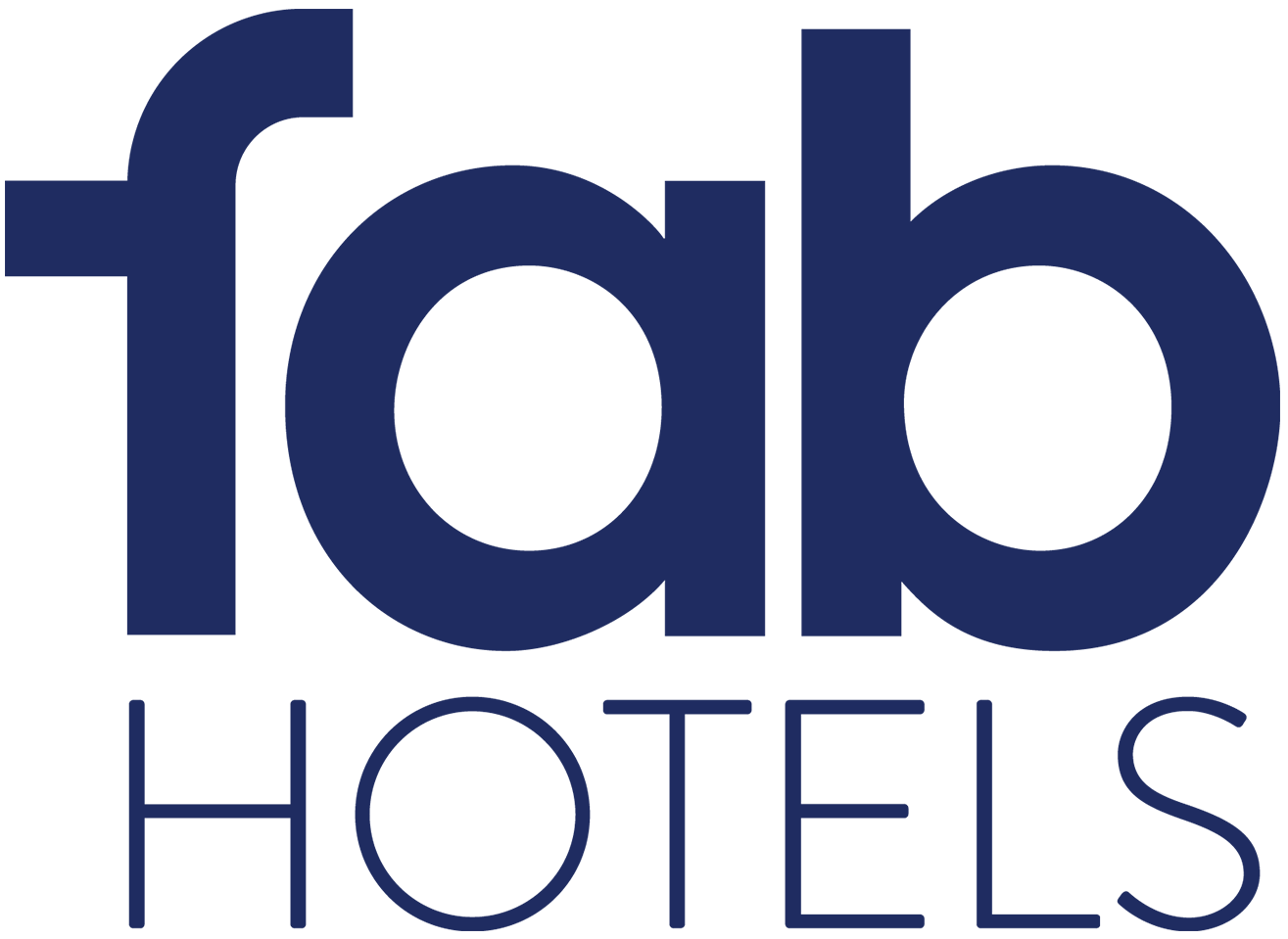
- Industry: Hospitality
- Founded: 2014
- Founder: Vaibhav Aggarwal; Adarsh Manpuria
- Headquarters: Gurugram, India
- Area served: India
- Key people: Vaibhav Aggarwal (Co-Founder); Adarsh Manpuria (Co-Founder)
- Revenue: ₹20.9 crore (FY16)
- Number of employees: 450+
- Website: www.fabhotels.com

FabHotels is a network of 3 star budget hotels in India, having its headquarters in Gurugram. As of November 2022 it operates in more than 66 cities of India with 900+ hotels, including major cities like Mumbai, New Delhi, Chennai, Bangalore, Kolkata, Hyderabad, Visakhapatnam and Coimbatore. Its operations began in 2014.

== History ==
FabHotels was founded in 2014 by Vaibhav Aggarwal, an alumnus of IIT Guwahati and Wharton School of the University of Pennsylvania and Adarsh Manpuria, also an alumnus of The Wharton School of the University of Pennsylvania.

== Funding ==
In 2016, FabHotels raised a funding of $8 million from Accel Partners, RB Investments, Mohandas Pai’s Aarin Capital and Qualcomm Ventures.

In 2017, FabHotels received a funding of $25 million in a Series B funding from Goldman Sachs. Accel Partners also participated in this round.

== See also ==
- List of chained-brand hotels
- OYO Rooms
