= Jaffarpur Kalan =

Village in Delhi

Jaffarpur Kalan is an urban centre located on the south west borders of the National Capital Territory of Delhi.

== Overview ==
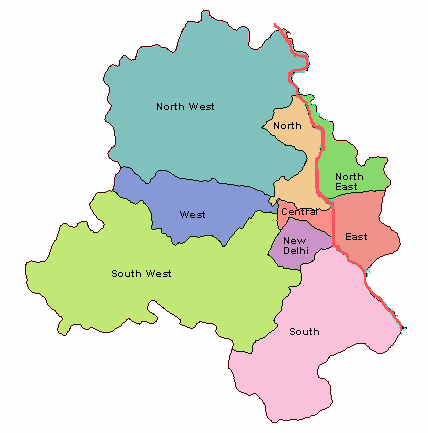
Delhi areas

The village is situated on the south west boundary of Delhi. The village falls on the way to two important Delhi-Haryana borders, viz. Dhansa Border and Daurala Border. The village falls under the Najafgarh Vidhan Lok Sabha Constituency of West Delhi. Jaffarpur Kalan is an important village in the adjoining villages of the area due to availability of a host of services for them.

Important institutions of repute present in the area are Rao Tula Ram Hospital, Ch. Brahm Prakash Government Engineering College, Jawahar Navodaya Vidyalaya, Ch. Brahm Prakash Industrial Training Institute, Jaffarpur Kalan Police Station, BSES substation, State Bank of India, and Delhi Government Aided schools.

== Rao Tularam Hospital ==
Rao Tularam hospital is located near the police station in Jaffar Pur and is approachable from Rawta mor of Dhansa Road.

== Chaudhary Brahm Prakash Government Engineering College ==
CBP Government Engineering College (Hindi: राजकीय अभियांत्रिकी महाविद्यालय), or GEC Jaffarpur was established by the Department of Training and Technical Education, Government of Delhi. The college was named after Ch. Brahm Prakash, the first chief minister of Delhi. The college is country's first engineering college which has been dedicated to civil engineering. Its campus has now been acquired by Netaji Subhas University of Technology, a state university established by the Government of NCT of Delhi, as its West Campus to run specialised engineering courses since September 2020.

== Other important institutions ==
- Jawahar Navodaya Vidyalaya, Jaffarpur Kalan
- Ch. Brahm Prakash Industrial Training Institute, Jaffarpur Kalan
- State Bank of India, Jaffarpur Kalan
- Delhi Government Aided Sarvodaya Vidyalayas
- Police Station
- Electrical Power House
