= Mettl =

Indian technology company

Mercer Mettl
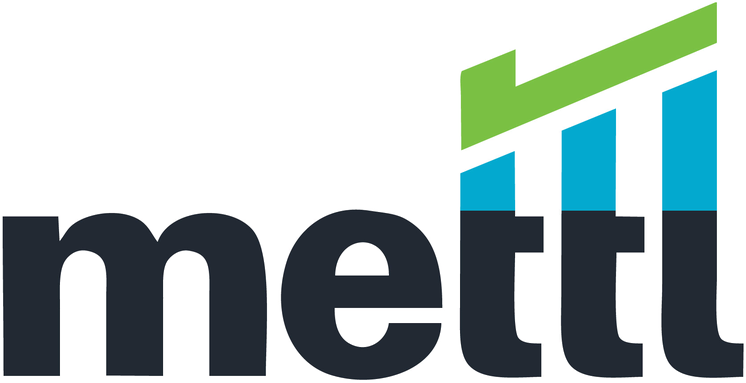
- Company type: Software Company
- Founded: 2010
- Founders: Tonmoy Shingal, Ketan Kapoor
- Headquarters: Gurgaon, Haryana, India
- Key people: Siddhartha Gupta, CEO
- Parent: Induslynk Training Services Pvt. Ltd.
- Website: mettl.com/en/

Mercer Mettl is a technology company that provides skill assessment tools, proctoring, and online assessment software.

== History ==
Mettl was founded in 2010 by Tonmoy Shingal and Ketan Kapoor. The duo pooled ₹ 8 lakh of their own money, and raised additional funds from family and friends to bring initial funding to $100,000. The company also received Angel Funding of $350,000 from Blume Ventures in 2010. It raised $4 million in a Series A funding round in 2012, led by IndoUS Ventures with IndoUS Venture investor Vani Kola joining the company board.

By 2013, more than 200 corporations and universities internationally had used the platform and by 2018, Mettl had more than 1500 clients globally.

== Platform ==
Mettl is an online platform that provides skill assessments for corporate clients for hiring and training and development. It provides a pre-existing testing library and also customizes tests for the specific needs of an employer. Its proctoring technology enables cheating prevention using facial and keystroke recognition to verify the test taker and monitor the candidate using the webcam.
