= DreamFolks =

Indian airport services company

DreamFolks Services Limited
- Type: Public
- Traded as: BSE: 543591; NSE: DREAMFOLKS
- ISIN: INE0JS101016
- Industry: Airport services
- Founded: 2013; 13 years ago
- Headquarters: Gurugram, India,
- Key people: Liberatha Peter Kallat; Dinesh Nagpal; Mukesh Yadav
- Services: Airport lounges and transfer
- Website: www.dreamfolks.in

DreamFolks Services Limited is an Indian airport service aggregator company established in 2013 and headquartered in Gurugram. It provides consumers to access airport-related services via technology driven platform.

It was 100% owned by the promoters, Liberatha Peter Kallat and Dinesh Nagpal each had 33% shareholding in the company, and the remaining 34% shareholding was held by Mukesh Yadav. Later, the company listed publicly on the Indian stock exchange on 6 September 2022, diluting 33% of the promoters’ stakes.

In Oct 2022, It had 100% coverage across 54 airport lounges in India and a market share of over 95% of all India-issued card-based access to domestic lounges in India. It is present in 121 countries worldwide

== History ==
The company started its operations in 2013 by facilitating lounge access services for the consumers of Mastercard. It has evolved from an airport lounge aggregator to an end-to-end technology solutions provider.

In July 2021, DreamFolks had a 90% market share in India and was present in 140 countries worldwide. In FY 2021-22, the company catered to 68% of the overall lounge volume traffic across all lounges in Indian airports (domestic and international lounges).

In Aug 2022, the company opened its initial public offering (IPO) with an Offer For Sale (OFS) of up to 1.7 crore equity shares on 24 August 2022 and listed in BSE & NSE on 6 September 2022. The IPO raised ₹562 crore (equivalent to ₹596 crore or US$62 million in 2023) and gained a premium of 55% to the issue price of ₹326 on the opening day. In the year ended FY22, the company has an Indian market share of 95% of all the Indian issued credit and debit card access to airport lounges.

In the second quarter of FY23, the company recorded a profit of ₹14.78 crore (equivalent to ₹16 crore or US$1.6 million in 2023). The revenue from operations grew to ₹171.24 crore (equivalent to ₹181 crore or US$19 million in 2023) as compared to the last year.

=== Partnerships ===
The company has partnered with all the card networks which are operating in India including Mastercard, Diners, Discover, Rupay and prominent card issuers like ICICI, Axis, Kotak Mahindra, HDFC and SBI.

- In June 2021, DreamFolks partnered with Go First (formerly known as Goair) for departure lounge services across selected airports in India. This includes 30 domestic terminals and 12 international terminals providing food and beverages, entertainment, free wi-fi and business centre facilities.
- In Sep 2022, the company partnered with nine lounges at eight railway stations across the country Paharganj (New Delhi), Ajmeri Gate (New Delhi),Madurai, Ahmedabad, Sealdah, Agra Cantt, Jaipur and Varanasi.
- In Dec 2022, the company strategically partnered with Vidsur Golf which allowed them access to their 250 golf courses across India and Asia Pacific.
- In March 2023, DreamFolks partnered with Visa Worldwide Pte. for launching Global Duty Free Services.
- In March 2024, DreamFolks partnered with Healthians.

== Funding ==
In Aug 2022, before the launch of the initial public offering (IPO), the company raised ₹253 crore (equivalent to ₹268 crore or US$28 million in 2023) from 18 anchor investors including marquee global and other domestic investors. According to BSE website, DreamFolks allotted ₹1.7 crore (equivalent to ₹1.8 crore or US$190,000 in 2023) shares to anchor investors at a price of ₹326 a piece by aggregating the transaction size to ₹253 crore (equivalent to ₹268 crore or US$28 million in 2023). Smallcap World Fund was the largest bidder with 28.46% of the total portion offered for anchor investors. And, Aditya Birla Sun Life MF, Invesco India MF, and Sundaram Mutual Fund were among the top five investors.

== Services ==
The company helps all the consumers who have access to airport-related services like lounges, food and beverages, meet and assist airport transfer, spa, nap rooms or transit hotels, and baggage transfer.

== Financials ==
COVID-19 restrictions severely impacted its financials during FY21.

Year	Revenue (In crores)	Profits/Loss (In crores)	Ref.
FY 2020	▲367	▲16.25	
FY 2021	▼108	▼1.45	
FY 2022	▲283	▲31	

== Corporate Social Responsibility ==
Dreamfolks adopted two schools as part of Girl Child Empowerment Initiative in Gurgaon, Haryana.
