= Pristyn Care =

Indian health-tech company

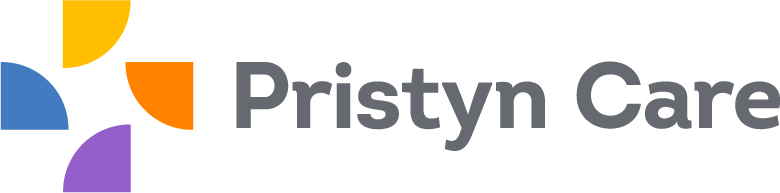
- Pristyn Care
- Company type: Private
- Industry: Healthcare
- Founded: August 2018; 7 years ago
- Founders: Harsimarbir Singh, Dr. Vaibhav Kapoor & Dr. Garima Sawhney
- Headquarters: Gurugram, India
- Area served: India
- Key people: Harsimarbir Singh, Dr. Vaibhav Kapoor & Dr. Garima Sawhney
- Services: Clinics; Pharmacy; Surgery; Outpatient cares
- Revenue: ▲₹453 crore (US$47 million) (FY23)
- Net income: ▲₹4 crore (US$420,000) (FY24 Q1)
- Number of employees: 1200+ (2024)
- Parent: GHV Advanced Health Pvt Ltd.
- Website: www.pristyncare.com

Pristyn Care is a Gurugram based health-tech company that deals in minimal invasive medical and surgical interventions. The organization has a network of more than 700 partnered hospitals and 100 clinics. The company was started in 2018 and covers proctology, gynaecology, IVF, urology, vascular, otorhinolaryngology, laparoscopy, anaesthetics, and ophthalmology.

== History ==
Pristyn Care was founded in 2018 by Harsimarbir Singh, Dr. Vaibhav Kapoor, and Dr. Garima Sawhney.

In 2019, Pristyn Care had around 70 clinics with over 250 partnered hospitals across 14 cities, and 70 in-house surgeons. Over time, the company expanded the services and acquired more clinics, hospitals, and doctors. Currently, with over 100 clinics, 700 partner hospitals, and 300 in-house super-specialty doctors, the company is present in over 40 cities across India.

Pristyn partnered with Urban Company to provide home-based online medical consultation and supplies in 2020 during COVID-19 Lockdown. It also donated 10,000 masks to Delhi police to support the control of the pandemic.

In December 2021, Pristyn Care underwent a Series E funding round in which Sequoia Capital valued the company at $1.4 billion, giving the company unicorn status.

== Funding rounds ==
As a healthcare delivery startup, Pristyn Care raised $4 million in the Series A round of funding from Sequoia Capital India in June 2019.

In December 2019, the company raised $12 million (₹85 crore) in a Series B funding round again led by Sequoia Capital India, Hummingbird Ventures, Greenoaks Capital, and AngelList.

In September 2020, Series C funding led by Hummingbird Ventures, Sequoia Capital, Greenoaks Capital, AngelList, Epiq Capital, and Redwood Trust raised ₹86.4 crores to further support the company's growth and vision.

In April 2021, Pristyn Care got $53 million in the Series D funding round led by Tiger Global Management. This funding increased the company's valuation to more than $550 million.

In the latest Series E funding round led by marquee investors, including Sequoia Capital, Tiger Global, Epiq Capital, Hummingbird Ventures, and Trifecta Capital, Pristyn Care raised $96 million.

== Acquisition ==
In June 2022, Pristyn Care acquired the health-tech platform Lybrate. As part of the acquisition, 150 employees from Lybrate joined Pristyn Care.

== Controversies ==
In September 2022, Pristyn Care co-founder Harsimarbir Singh faced widespread backlash online following a LinkedIn post in which he shared his "interview hacks" designed to weed out prospective job candidates. Tactics Singh shared included making applicants wait six to eight hours to test their patience, scheduling interviews in early morning hours or late at night, scheduling interviews on Sunday and making outstation candidates to show up to the office the next day. Singh deleted his post, but screenshots of it circulated the internet, where it was negatively received.

== Layoff ==
In recent years, Pristyn Care has faced scrutiny regarding its company culture and layoffs. In March 2024, the company laid off approximately 120 employees, citing economic challenges and a need to streamline IPO Journey. This decision was part of a broader trend in the health-tech industry, where several companies have had to make difficult decisions to maintain financial stability.
