= Rapyd =

Financial technology company

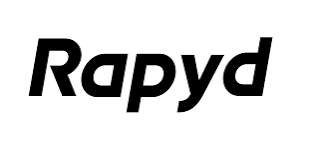
- Type: Private
- Industry: Financial technology
- Founded: 2016
- Founders: Arik Shtilman; Arkady Karpman; Omer Priel
- Website: rapyd.net

Rapyd is a digital payment processing and fintech services company founded in Tel Aviv in 2016. The company provides a platform for payments and financial services. It is Israel's largest private high-tech company.

== History ==
=== 2010s: Foundation as CashDash ===
Rapyd was founded in 2016 as a consumer-facing digital wallet called CashDash, intended for travelers. In 2017, the company pivoted to a business-to-business model, developing a suite of APIs that provide access to global financial services.

=== 2020s: Expansion as Rapyd ===
In April 2020, Rapyd acquired KORTA, an Icelandic payment service provider and card acquirer. In July 2022, Rapyd completed the acquisition of Valitor, an Icelandic payments solutions company, from Arion Banki for approximately $110 million. Valitor provided in-store and online payment acceptance and card issuing to merchants across Iceland, the United Kingdom, Ireland, and Europe.

In August 2021, Rapyd became Israel's most valuable private startup with a valuation of over $8 billion. In July 2022, it was valued at $15 billion.

In May 2022, Rapyd opened an office in Dubai, becoming the first Israeli company to be regulated in the United Arab Emirates. In June 2025, Rapyd entered into a seven-year sponsorship deal with Maccabi Tel Aviv basketball club, officially changing the team's name to Maccabi Rapyd Tel Aviv.

In March 2025, Rapyd announced the acquisition of PayU Global Payment Organization (GPO) in Latin America and Africa for $610 million. In May 2026, Rapyd announced a corporate restructuring to reposition its global operations around AI-driven operations.
