= Amartex =

Indian manufacturing and retail company

Amartex Logo

Amartex is a Manufacturing, Dyeing, Textile manufacturing and Retail Outlet Company in northern India, which was founded in 1988 by the Grover family. Amartex has 24 retail outlets selling ready-made garments under the brand name Groviano Italy.

== Awards ==
Punjab Rattan Award	The Millennium Great Personality of India
