= Yebhi =

Indian online shopping portal

YEBHI
- Company type: Private
- Website type: E-commerce
- Available in: English
- Founded: 2009
- Headquarters: Gurgaon, Haryana, India
- Area served: India
- Founders: Danish Ahmed, Manmohan Agrawal, Nitin Agarwal, Rajul Jain
- Key people: Amar Sohal, Kavinder Khurana
- Industry: Online shopping & Online Services
- Products
- Employees: 500 plus employees
- Website: yebhi.com
- Launched: September 2009

yebhi.com was an Indian E-commerce portal for home, lifestyle and fashion, launched in the year 2009.

== History ==
Yebhi, which began as BigShoeBazaar.com, has a registered user base of about 1.5 million people, of whom about half a million have transacted on the site. Nexus Venture Partners and N. R. Narayana Murthy’s Catamaran Ventures invested Rs 40 crore in Agarwal’s company in mid-2011.

On July' 10th 2012, Big Shoe Bazaar India Pvt Ltd. owner of Brand Yebhi.com announced that it has raised INR 100 Cr in Series C round of funding led by Fidelity Growth Partners India and Qualcomm. Subsequently, in April 2013, its site was revamped, along with a new logo.

On 4 September 2014, they changed their business model to coupon store and served Flipkart, Jabong, Myntra, Zovi, Koovs & Zivame as their clients.

The company launched a new app called Truxapp which connects truck owners to Businesses and raised $3.1 Mn in Pre-Series A funding from investors including Dhoot Family, Sandeep Sharma, V. C. Bothra & Family.

== Categories ==
Initially Yebhi.com has categories lifestyle & Home products and offers products from a range of some 250 brands to its customers dealing in Shoes, Apparels, Bags, Mobiles, Cameras, Sunglasses, Watches, Books, Laptops, Home furnishing, Home décor, Home ware, Lingerie and Fragrances.

== Awards ==
- 5th Loyalty Awards which were presented by AIMIA

== See also ==
- Online shopping
- Ecommerce in India
