= EaseMyTrip =

Indian multinational online travel company

- Company type: Public
- Traded as: BSE: 543272; NSE: EASEMYTRIP
- ISIN: INE07O001018
- Industry: Online travel agency
- Founded: 2008; 18 years ago
- Founders: Nishant Pitti; Rikant Pitti; Prashant Pitti
- Headquarters: New Delhi, India
- Area served: Worldwide
- Services: Flight booking; Hotel bookings; Domestic holiday packages; International holiday packages; Bus bookings; Train bookings; Cruise bookings
- Revenue: ▲₹590 crore (US$62 million) (FY24)
- Operating income: ▲₹228 crore (US$24 million) (FY24)
- Net income: ▲₹157 crore (US$16 million) (FY24)
- Subsidiaries: Spree Hotels and Real Estate Pvt Ltd
- Website: www.easemytrip.com

EaseMyTrip is an Indian multinational online travel company, headquartered in New Delhi. It was founded in 2008 by Nishant Pitti, Rikant Pitti, and Prashant Pitti. The company provides hotel bookings, air tickets, domestic and international holiday packages, bus bookings, and white-label services.

== History ==
Homescreen of the EaseMyTrip mobile app

The idea for EaseMyTrip came when the brothers, Nishant Pitti and Rikant Pitti used to book air tickets for their father's frequent business trips, and saved money in the booking process. Initially based out of their home garage as a travel agency, the duo lost all of the initial investment within the first three months. Later on, references from family and friends helped and a major turnaround came when an airline noticed multiple bookings coming from a single email account and contacted the Pitti brothers to become its travel partner.

In 2019, EaseMyTrip had a network of more than 42,000 travel agents, 1,200 franchise outlets, 640 white-label solutions, and around 1,600 distributors.

In 2019, EaseMyTrip expanded its operations to international markets such as UAE, UK, US, Philippines, Singapore, and Thailand.

In March 2021, EaseMyTrip went public with an initial public offering. It became the first online travel agency to be listed on the Indian stock exchanges.

In June 2021, EaseMyTrip collaborated with Oyo Rooms, Airbnb, and Yatra to form the Confederation of Hospitality, Technology and Tourism Industry (CHATT), an industry body for the tourism sector of India.

In September 2021, it became a unicorn after its market capitalisation crossed $1 billion. In December 2021, the organisation hired Vijay Raaz and Varun Sharma as their brand ambassadors.

EaseMyTrip acquired Spree Hospitality, a hospital management company established in 2011 by Keshab Baljee, for an undisclosed amount. The company announced the acquisition of travel marketplace Traviate in October 2021. EaseMyTrip acquired Yolobus, an intercity mobility platform, in 2021.

In August 2024, the platform signed on Jacqueline Fernandez as a brand ambassador.

On 17 September 2024, it announced its move into the medical tourism sector with the acquisition of a 49 per cent equity stake in Pflege Home Healthcare for ₹30 crore, and a 30 per cent stake in Rollins International for ₹60 crore.

In November 2024, EaseMyTrip acquired a 49% stake in Planet Education Australia. This move will expand its presence in international study tourism.

== Controversies ==
On March 8, 2022, a consumer technology firm from Pune called udChalo filed a trademark infringement case against EaseMyTrip. Previously, MakeMyTrip also moved to Delhi High Court against the company and Google both for Trademark violation.
