= Tata Business Support Services =

Business subsidiary of Tata Sons

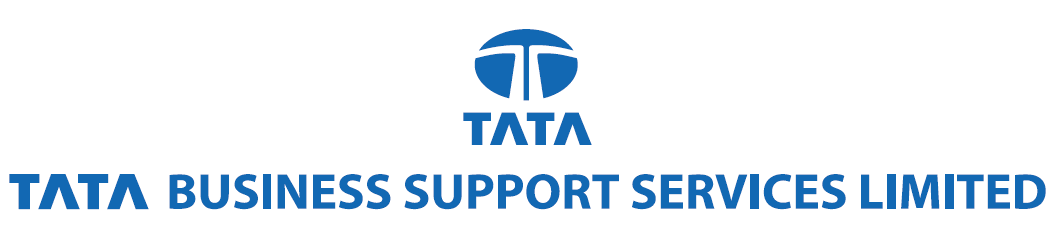
- Company type: Private Limited
- Industry: Business process outsourcing
- Founded: 2004
- Headquarters: Hyderabad
- Area served: Worldwide
- Key people: Srinivas Koppolu
- Number of employees: 23,000 (31 August 2015)
- Website: conneqtcorp.com/in/

Tata Business Support Services Ltd (Tata BSS) was a wholly owned subsidiary of Tata Sons, providing outsourced contact center services to large telecommunications operators, Internet service providers, DTH service providers, and online travel agencies amongst other domestic (Indian) and international clients.

== History ==
Tata Business Support Services was founded in 2004 as a wholly owned subsidiary of Tata Sons, the holding company of the Tata Group.

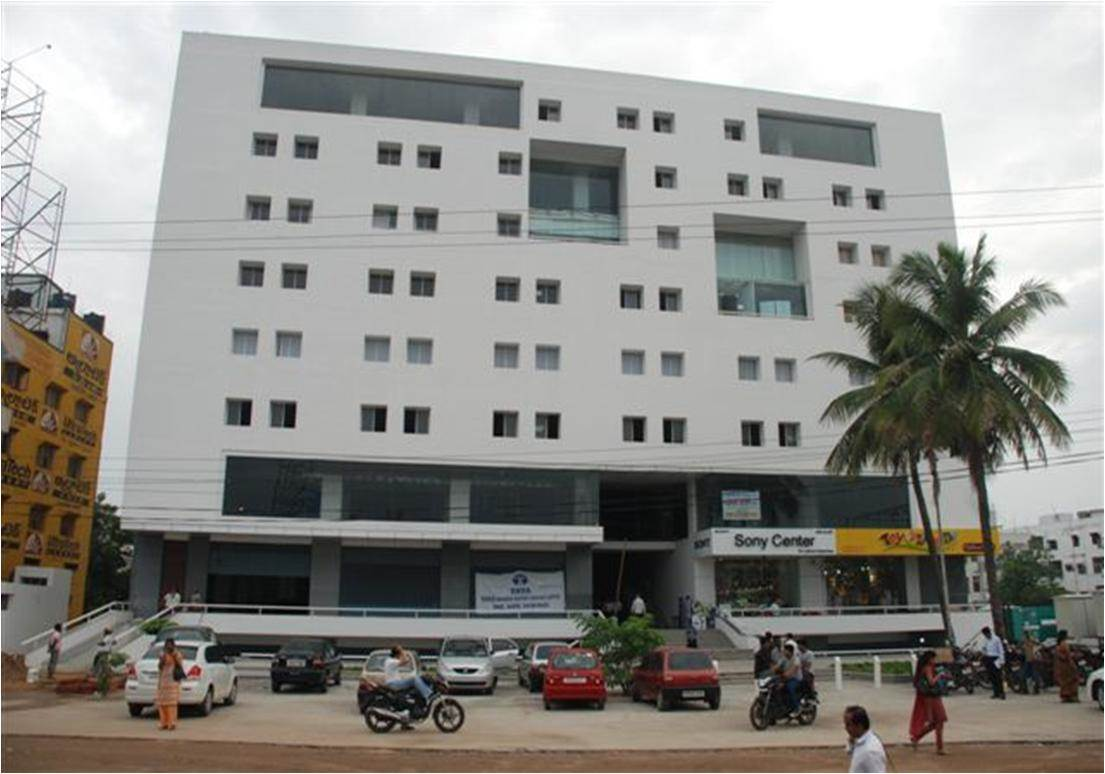
Tata BSS Delivery center-2 in Hyderabad

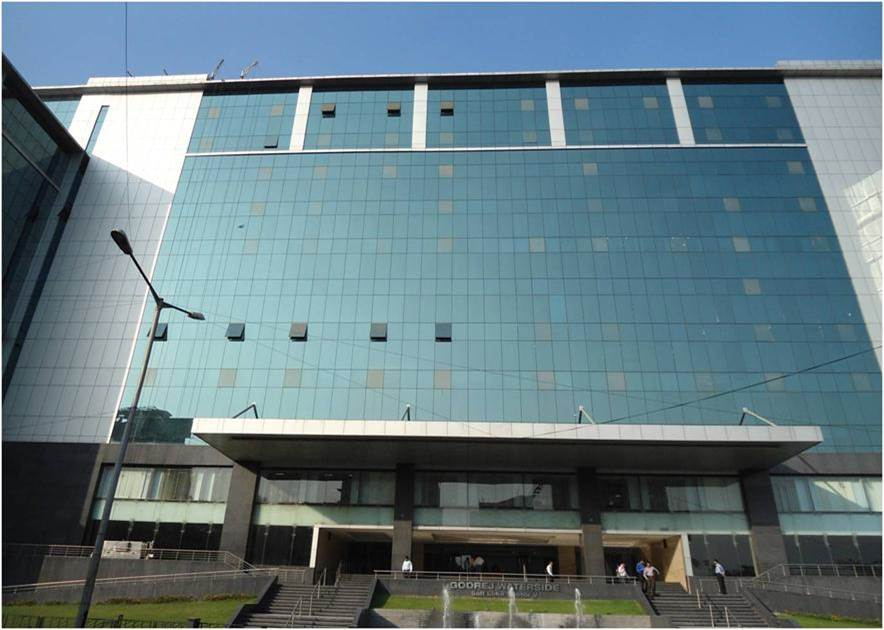
Tata BSS Kolkata Office

In November 2017, business services provider Quess Corp acquired a 51% stake in Tata Business Support Services (TBSS) for ₹153 crore. TBSS was subsequently renamed Conneqt Business Solutions. Quess Corp increased its stake in the company to 70% in May 2019 and 100% in April 2021.
