= Healthians =

Indian diagnostic company

- Company type: Private
- Founded: April 2015; 11 years ago
- Founder: Deepak Sahni
- Headquarters: Gurugram, Haryana, India
- Number of locations: 250+
- Area served: India
- Key people: Deepak Sahni (Founder & Chairman), Nishant Singhal ( CEO and Board Member)
- Revenue: ▲₹500 crore (US$52 million) (2022)
- Website: www.healthians.com

Healthians is an Indian health-tech company offering at-home diagnostic health test services with its headquarters in Gurgaon, Haryana. It was incorporated in 2015 as a subsidiary of Expedient Healthcare.

Healthians was founded by Deepak Sahni in 2015. The first laboratory was set up by Healthians in Gurugram. It operates in over 250+ cities and has a network of 20 labs across the country.

As of 2025, the company is led by Nishant Singhal, CEO and Board member

== Funding ==
Healthians had raised seed funding from Healthstart in 2015. In the same year cricketer Yuvraj Singh’s venture capital firm YouWeCan was the next investor in Healthians. In the year 2016 Japanese VC fund BeeNext invested in the firm through series A round of funding. In November 2019 Healthian had raised funds up to $14 mn through series B funding where $12 million were raised from Japan-based DG Incubation and DG Daiwa Ventures. Apart from this Beenos Partners, Mistetoe, Trifecta Capital, HealthStart have also invested in Healthians. Asuka Holdings and Kotak Private Equity have also invested in the firm. The firm’s total funding stands at $22.8 million. In 2022 the Healthians announced it will raise another $54 mn in a funding led by WestBridge Capital.

== Controversy ==
A complaint was filed by Dr. Rohit Jain that an online health service provider (Healthians) was allegedly allowed to collect samples of COVID-19 patients without proper license. On 26 October, Gurugram Police filed an affidavit with Delhi High Court that "Healthians never performed any COVID-19 test till April 15, 2021, and was only involved in sample collection under MoU with NABL and ICMR approved COVID-19 labs. It has registration certificate under Clinical Establishment Act, 2010."
