= English Indian Clays =

EICL Limited
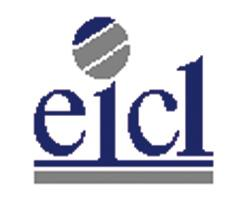
- Company type: Public
- Traded as: BSE: 526560
- Industry: Manufacturing
- Founded: 18.11.1963
- Headquarters: New Delhi and manufacturing plants at Trivandrum, Kollam, Yamunanagar, Shimoga in, India
- Key people: Karan Thapar (chairman), Bhagawandas Bhojwani (chief executive officer), Rahul Gupta (executive director)
- Products: Processed China clay, calcined clay, delaminated clay, metakaolin. Nano clay, maize starch, modified starch, corn syrups.
- Divisions: Clay, starch
- Website: www.eicl.in

English Indian Clays Ltd., a company incorporated in India, was part of the erstwhile Thapar Group. The company was incorporated in 1963 in technical and financial collaboration with English China Clays of the UK, the then world leader in kaolin processing. This collaboration with ECC ceased in the year 1992.

EICL has two key divisions, clay and starch. The Clay Division, having three manufacturing locations in Kerala, specialises in mining and processing of high end kaolins. The Starch Division has two manufacturing units, one located at Yamunanagar, Haryana, manufacturing starch and its derivatives, and the other located at Shimoga exclusively specializing in the manufacture of value added modified starches for various industrial applications.

The Starch division was reportedly sold to Bluecraft Agro Private Limited in January 2019.

The Starch Division was started under the name of Bharat Starch Industries in the year 1937. It was subsequently taken over by English Indian Clays Ltd. in the year 2002.

Clay applications	Starch applications
Coating pigment in paper and board industries, to impart gloss, printability and finish.; Extender pigment in paint .; Effective filler in the manufacturing of plastics, rubber goods and paper.; Key raw material in glass fibre and tile industries.; Structurant in soaps.; Other areas of application include industrial blue, refractories, sealants and pharmaceuticals.	Wet-end additives, surface sizing and coating binders for paper industry.; Adhesives for paper sack-packaging industry.; Starches for pharmaceutical industry.; Syrups for confectionery, food and beverage industry.; Yarn sizing.; Printing and finishing for textile industry.; Starches for oil well drilling industry.
