= Nishant Pitti =

Indian co-founder

- Born: 1986 (age 39–40); Delhi
- Education: University of Delhi
- Occupation: Entrepreneur
- Known for: EaseMyTrip

Nishant Pitti (born 1986) is the founder of EaseMyTrip. He also worked on the production of several Bollywood films, including Guest iin London.

== Early life ==
Born in 1986, Nishant Pitti has two other siblings Rikant Pitti and Prashant Pitti. His father is a commodity businessman. He did his graduation from Delhi University.

== Career ==
Nishant Pitti bootstrapped the travel business, EaseMyTrip, in 2008 along with his brothers. Since 2014, he has been producing Bollywood films as a branding initiative for EaseMyTrip.

=== Filmography ===
Year	Movie	Participation	Language	Ref
2020	Taish	Producer	Hindi	
2019	Blank	Producer	Hindi	
2019	Manikarnika: The Queen of Jhansi	Co-Producer	Hindi	
2018	Fanney Khan	Producer	Hindi	
2018	Batti Gul Meter Chalu	Producer	Hindi	
2017	Guest iin London	Co-Producer	Hindi	
2016	Freaky Ali	Co-Producer	Hindi	
2016	Madaari	Co-Producer	Hindi	
2014	Mumbai 125 KM	Producer	Hindi	
