= RedBus =

Online bus ticketing company

redbus
- Type: Private
- Industry: Online travel
- Founded: 2006; 20 years ago
- Founders: Phanindra Sama; Charan Padmaraju; Sudhakar Pasupunuri
- Headquarters: Bangalore, Karnataka, India
- Area served: India
- Key people: Prakash Sangam (CEO); Anoop Menon (CTO)
- Products: Booking buses, trains and cabs
- Revenue: US$85 million (2019)
- Parent: MakeMyTrip
- Website: redbus.com

Redbus India Private Limited, doing business as redBus, is an Indian multinational online bus-ticketing platform that provides bus and train ticket booking through its website and iOS and Android mobile apps. It is headquartered in Bangalore and works like a hub, acting as a medium for a network of more than 3500 bus operators, across the countries of India, Malaysia, Indonesia, Singapore, Peru, and Colombia. It claims to have registered over 180 million trips, with a customer base of over 20 million. In 2018, the company achieved a GMV of ₹50 billion (equivalent to ₹67 billion or US$690 million in 2023), with a 70% share in the Indian online bus ticketing segment.

In 2013, redBus was acquired by Ibibo Group. In 2017, the Ibibo Group was acquired by MakeMyTrip.

== History ==
redBus was founded in 2006 by Phanindra Sama, Sudhakar Pasupunuri and Charan Padmaraju, engineers from the Birla Institute of Technology and Science, who also worked together at various organisations before founding the company. With an initial investment of ₹500,000 (equivalent to ₹1.6 million or US$17,000 in 2023), the founders began operations in 2006, by tying up with various travel agents for seat reservations through the redBus portal. In the same year the company was selected for the TiE Entrepreneurship Acceleration Program and was mentored on several aspects of the business. The company owns BOGDS, a cloud computing service for bus operators, and SeatSeller, a GDS for bus inventory distribution.

== Operation ==
In 2014, the company appointed Prakash Sangam as its Chief executive officer, who was earlier the Executive Vice President of Info Edge India (Naukri Group), heading Shiksha.com and Jeevansathi.com.

In April 2022, redBus appointed Allu Arjun, as its brand ambassador.

== Partnership ==
In 2012, redBus tied-up with Goa State Road Transport to launch an online ticketing portal. In the same year, the company announced a partnership with the Rajasthan State Road Transport Corporation (RSRTC), following which it started offering RSRTC bus tickets on the portal. Early in 2019, redBus partnered with Acko General Insurance to offer travel insurance for its users to cover accidents, baggage loss, cancellation and bus-type mismatch. It also partnered with Truecaller, to offer bus ticket booking on Android devices. redBus afterwards announced a partnership with Google Maps to display information on busses that ply between cities with the time and date services to enhance user experience.

June 2019, redBus started ride sharing operations - rPool, across Bengaluru, Pune and Hyderabad. rPool is an option that helps ride givers to share(pool) their vehicle to fellow ride takers.

On 26 November 2019, redBus partnered with Amazon India to launch a bus ticket booking service on Amazon.

== Funding ==
In 2007, redBus received its first round of funding of $1 million (₹30 million) from SeedFund and undisclosed investors. SeedFund had invested $500,000 in the company while other investors accounted for the remaining $500,000 investment.

In 2009, the company raised a funding of a $2.5 million from Inventus Capital Partners, Seed Fund and other unnamed investors.

In 2011, redBus raised another funding of $6.5 million from Helion Venture Partners, Seedfund and Inventus Capital.

In 2013, redBus was acquired by Ibibo Group, a subsidiary of South Africa’s Naspers.

== See also ==
- Internet booking engine
- MakeMyTrip
- Ibibo
- Cityflo
