= Oyo Rooms =

Indian multinational hospitality company

OYO Rooms
- Trade name: OYO Rooms; OYO Hotels and Homes
- Type: Private
- Industry: Hospitality
- Founded: 2012; 14 years ago
- Founder: Ritesh Agarwal
- Headquarters: Gurgaon, Haryana, India
- Area served: Asia, Europe and Americas
- Key people: Ritesh Agarwal (Group CEO)
- Revenue: ▲₹6,253 crore (FY25)
- Operating income: ▲₹1,083 crore (FY25)
- Net income: ▲₹245 crore (FY25)
- Total assets: ▲₹8,751 crore (US$910 million) (2021)
- Owners: SoftBank (46.62%); Ritesh Agarwal (33.15%)
- Number of employees: 1,330 (2023)
- Parent: PRISM
- Subsidiaries: Motel 6
- Website: oyorooms.com

OYO Rooms (stylised as OYO), formerly known as OYO Hotels & Homes, is an Indian multinational hospitality chain owned by PRISM which operates leased hotels, homes, and living spaces. It is headquartered in Gurgaon, Haryana. Founded in 2012 by Ritesh Agarwal, OYO initially consisted mainly of budget hotels. As of January 2020, it has more than 43,000 properties and 1 million rooms across 800 cities in 80 countries.

== History ==
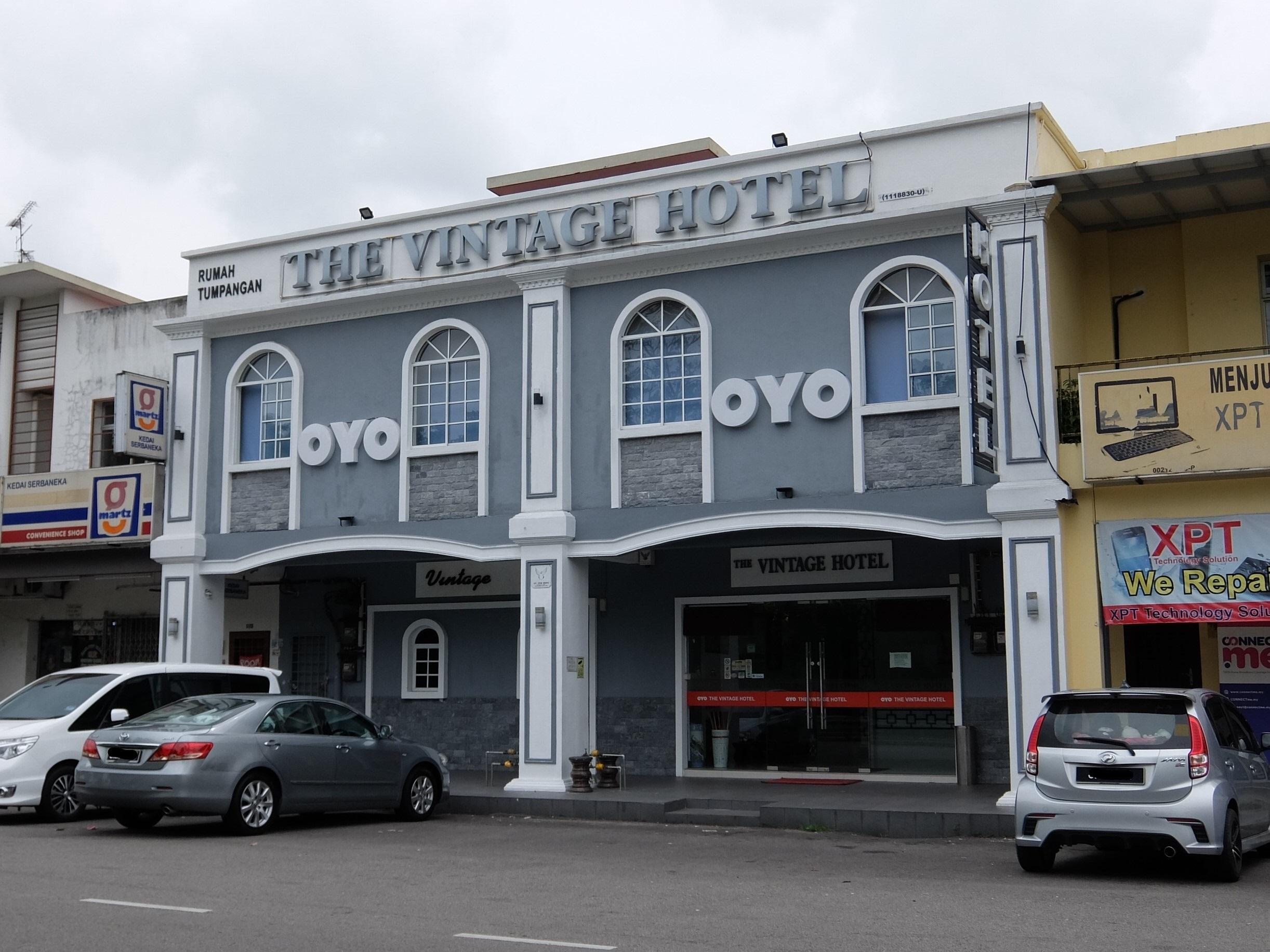
OYO hotel in Johor, Malaysia

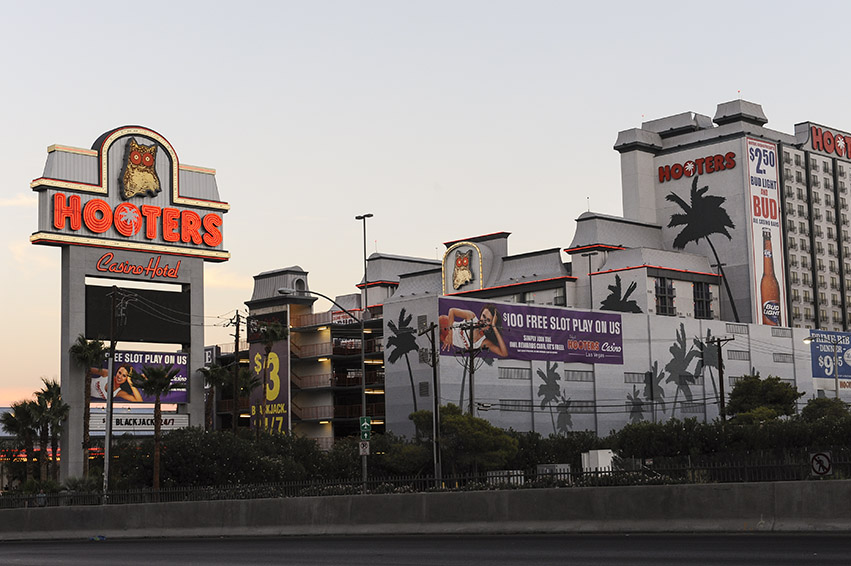
In 2019, OYO acquired Hooters Casino Hotel near the Las Vegas Strip

In 2012, Ritesh Agarwal launched Oravel Stays as a budget accommodation listing and booking website, later renamed to OYO in 2013. Shortly after launching Oravel Stays, Ritesh Agarwal received a grant of $100,000 as part of the Thiel Fellowship, a two-year program from PayPal co-founder Peter Thiel.

In November 2015, Oyo signed a term sheet to acquire Zostel's Zo Rooms in an all-stock deal which would give Zostel's founders and investors a combined 7% stake in Oyo. In February 2016, Oyo's biggest stakeholder SoftBank announced in its earnings report that the acquisition was completed. However, in October 2017, Oyo stated that the deal was called-off and the "non-binding term sheet" for the deal had expired in September 2016. Zostel claimed that the term sheet was binding and it had transferred its business to Oyo which in turn failed to transfer the 7% stake. In 2018, Zostel approached the Supreme Court of India, which appointed former Chief Justice of India, A. M. Ahmadi as the sole arbitrator to resolve the dispute. In March 2021, Ahmadi ruled that the term sheet was binding and Zostel was entitled to execute the definitive agreements in the contract. In October 2021, Zostel wrote to the Securities and Exchange Board of India, seeking a stay on Oyo's IPO and claiming that Oyo's "capital structure is not final." In February 2022, the Delhi High Court rejected Zostel's appeal for a 7% stake in Oyo.

In March 2016, OYO acquired the team of Qlik Pass, founded by Rahul Gupta and Rishi Swami, to set up and lead its data science department.

In March 2018, OYO acquired Chennai-based service apartment operator, Novascotia Boutique Homes, to establish its presence in the service apartment and corporate executive stay segment. It acquired Weddingz.in, a Mumbai-based online marketplace for wedding venues and vendors.

In 2019, OYO and Airbnb announced a strategic partnership where OYO would list their properties in the Airbnb platform. In March 2019, OYO announced a ₹1,400 crore investment in its India and South Asia businesses. In April 2019, OYO announced a strategic global distribution partnership with Hotelbeds. The company also announced two joint-ventures with SoftBank and Yahoo! Japan in 2019. In May 2019, OYO announced the acquisition of Amsterdam-based @Leisure Group, a European vacation rental company, for $415 million. In July 2019, OYO announced the acquisition of Innov8, a co-working space in New Delhi. The same year OYO bought a Danish vacation home rental company, DanCenter.

In August 2019, OYO made its first major investment in the United States by purchasing the Hooters Casino Hotel, near the Las Vegas Strip, in partnership with US-based real estate company Highgate, for $135 million. In September 2019, Oyo announced the acquisition of the Copenhagen-based data science firm Danamica for $10 million.

In June 2021, OYO Rooms collaborated with Yatra, Airbnb, and EaseMyTrip to form the Confederation of Hospitality, Technology and Tourism Industry (CHATT), an industry body for the tourism sector of India.

In October 2021, OYO appointed Paralympian Deepa Malik as an independent director on the company's board of directors. In December 2021, OYO onboarded former State Bank of India (SBI) Chairman Rajnish Kumar as its strategic group advisor.

In May 2022, OYO announced the acquisition of Croatia-based vacation rental management company Direct Booker, valuing the latter at around US$5.5 million. The acquisition expanded OYO's European vacation-rental operations.

In December 2024, OYO completed its acquisition of G6 Hospitality from Blackstone Real Estate for US$525 million. G6 Hospitality is the parent company of the Motel 6 and Studio 6 brands.

In Summer 2026, the OYO Las Vegas was being listed on booking sites as Palette Las Vegas, while the hotel remained operating as OYO Las Vegas.

== Operations ==
In 2019, OYO had over 17,000 employees globally, of which approximately 8,000 were in India and South Asia. The company invests in capex, hires general managers to oversee operations and customer experience. OYO set up 26 training institutes for hospitality enthusiasts across India in 2019.

== Funding ==
The company's current and former investors include SoftBank Group, Didi Chuxing, Greenoaks Capital, Sequoia India, Lightspeed India, Hero Enterprise, Airbnb and China Lodging Group.

In September 2018, OYO raised $1 billion, of which the RoC filing for the amount of $100 million raised from Star Virtue Investment Ltd. was made on 13 February 2019.

In February 2019, OYO received $100 million funding from the Chinese vehicle-for-hire company, Didi Chuxing. In July 2019, Ritesh Agarwal, through RA Hospitality Holdings in Cayman Islands, signed a $2 billion deal to buy back shares from existing investors, Lightspeed Venture Partners and Sequoia India, to increase his stake in the company to 30%. The company was valued at $10 billion with this deal. In October 2019, OYO raised Series F funding of $1.5 billion led by SoftBank Group, Lightspeed Venture Partners and Sequoia India.

In July 2021, OYO closed a debt financing round of $660 million from global institutional investors to service existing loans. In July 2021, Microsoft expressed interest to invest in OYO before its IPO and a multi-year strategic deal was signed in September 2021. In October 2021, Oyo filed its draft red herring prospectus with the Securities and Exchange Board of India (SEBI) to raise US$1.2 billion through an initial public offering.

In January 2022, more than 500 current and former employees of OYO, purchased around 3 crore shares in the company. The total value of these shares can be approximated to about ₹330 crore (US$34 million), as per the last valuation of OYO of $9.6 billion.

In June 2024, Oyo held another round of funding, raising between $100 and $125 million. The company was valued at $2.5 billion, down over 70% from the previous valuation in 2019.

== Financials ==
Year	Revenue (In crores)	Profits/Loss (In crores)	Source
FY 2019	▲6,329	▼ −2,364	
FY 2020	▲13,168	▼ −13,122	
FY 2021	▼3,961	▼ −3,943	
FY 2022	▲4,781	▼ −1,940	
FY 2023	▲5,464	▼ −1,287	
FY 2024	▼5,388	▲229	
FY 2025	▲6,253	▲245	

== Services ==
Oyo Rooms operates the following brands for its properties and services:

- OYO Townhouse – midscale hospitality
- OYO Home – home management system that offers private homes in different locations and are fully managed by OYO
- OYO Vacation Homes – vacation home brand with vacation rental management brands Belvilla, Danland and DanCenter, along with Germany-based Traum-Ferienwohnungen. The division also includes operations acquired through Direct Booker, a Croatia-based vacation rental management company acquired by OYO in 2022.
- SilverKey – hotel brand focused on corporate travellers
- Capital O – hotel booking for business travellers
- Palette – upscale leisure resorts
- Collection O – booking and renting services to business travellers
- OYO LIFE – long-term rentals

=== DanCenter ===
DanCenter is a vacation rental marketplace listing more than 10,000 properties in Scandinavia and northern Germany. It is also the operator of 28 holiday resorts in Denmark under the Danland brand. DanCenter has approximately 260 full-time employees of which 65 are based in the headquarters at Lyngbyvej in Copenhagen.

The company was founded by Danmarks Turistråd (now VisitDenmark) as Dansk Centralkontor for Sommerhusudlejning in 1957. Its first CEO was Kurt Holmsted who later became its owner through the company Land & Leisure A/S. Land & Leisure A/S was sold to the Dutch company @Leisure in 2016. Following OYO's acquisition of @Leisure Group in 2019, DanCenter became part of OYO Vacation Homes.
