= Skill assessment =

Test for competence in a skill

Competence assessment is a process in which evidence is gathered by the assessor and evaluated against agreed criteria in order to make a judgement of competence. Skill assessment is the comparison of actual performance of a skill with the specified standard for performance of that skill under the circumstances specified by the standard, and evaluation of whether the performance meets or exceed the requirements. Assessment of a skill should comply with the four principles of validity, reliability, fairness and flexibility.

Formative assessment provides feedback for remedial work and coaching, while summative assessment checks whether the competence has been achieved at the end of training. Assessment of combinations of skills and their foundational knowledge may provide greater efficiency, and in some cases competence in one skill my imply competence in other skills. The thoroughness rewired of assessment may depend on the consequences of occasional poor performance.

== Principles of assessment ==
=== Validity ===
Validity is the primary requirement. If the assessment is not valid, then the other characteristics are irrelevant. Validity means that an assessment process effectively assesses what it is claimed and intended to assess. To achieve this the assessment tools must address all requirements of the standard to the appropriate depth (neither too much nor too little) and be repeated often enough to ensure that the required performance is repeatable.

The training standard that specifies the competency is the benchmark for assessment, and to be valid the assessment must comply exactly with its requirements, so that nothing required by the standard is omitted, and nothing that is not required is included.

The assessment tools for a skill therefore need to be designed so that they allow the skill to be tested in compliance with the requirements of the standard. It can be useful to map the assessment tools to the specific competences to ensure that they cover the full scope of the standard.

There may be a requirement for periodical validation of assessment tools. This process generally involves mapping the tools against the standard and checking that the tools comply with the other principles of assessment and the rules of evidence.

=== Reliability ===
After validity, reliability is essential. A reliable assessment is one where the evidence elicited and interpretation of evidence is consistent with the skill required, so that the assessment consistently produces outcomes that are compliant with the standard. The assessment decision of a given observed performance should not vary for different assessors. The same evidence should lead to the same outcome.

To achieve this, the assessment tool must provide sufficient guidance for the assessor. In practice the assessment instrument provided to the candidate should be paired with an assessor guide which provides instructions to the assessor to guide their judgement of satisfactory performance or acceptable answers to questions.

=== Fairness ===
To be fair the assessment process must be clearly understood by the candidates, and there must be agreement by both assessors and candidates that candidates' reasonable needs circumstances are addressed.

The assessment tool can provide evidence that the process is understood and accepted by the candidate, by having a place where a statement to this effect is signed by the candidate at the start of the assessment. A further statement that the assessor has checked with the candidate for any special circumstances or requirements can also be included. Reasonable adjustment must not compromise the validity or reliability of the assessment.

=== Flexibility ===
Flexibility of assessment is desirable where reasonably practicable. This is a feature that should be inherent in the assessment tools for the skill, and should take into account the expected variability of circumstances, including variations in candidates, equipment, location, environmental conditions and other things not entirely under the control of the assessor, but within the scope of the competence requirements. Flexibility does not imply bending the rules, or failing to comply with the specifications of the standards. All performance criteria must be addressed.

== Types of assessment ==
Formative assessments are formal and informal tests, tasks, quizzes, discussions or observations taken during the learning process. These assessments identify strengths and weaknesses and provide feedback to modify the consequent learning activities to facilitate efficient learning and skill development.

Summative assessments evaluate skills at or after the end of an instructional unit, to ensure that competence has been achieved. At this point remedial work may no longer be practicable.

Integrated assessment is part of the learning and teaching process, and can take place at various stages of a learning programme. Assessments may combine assessment of theory and practice. Some skills may need separate and specific assessment, but others can be combined for efficiency.

Assessment is not an event that only occurs at the end of training, it is most effective when continuous and when providing constant feedback on progress and problems, allowing timely intervention where useful. In many cases a sample of evidence is sufficient to infer competence over a fairly large range, as competence in a skill that requires competence in other skills may be a proxy for those more foundational skills.

Comprehensive planning is usually necessary to produce robust assessment tools that suit the training programme and do justice to both the training standard and the learners.

== Assessment methods ==
Assessment of practical skills is usually best done by direct observation of performance in conditions as close as reasonably practicable to the circumstances in which the skill would normally be practiced. Where this is not reasonably practicable, simulations may be appropriate, to whatever level of accuracy is available. Assessment of realistic combinations of skills may save a lot of time, and scenarios may be devised that allow simultaneous and sequential assessments of several skill in one assessment session.

The number of repetitions required will also depend on how critical the skill is considered to be. A single successful demonstration may be sufficient to show that the candidate can perform a task when the consequences are minor. Several sequential faultless performances may be required if another person's life will depend on correct performance.

Assessment tools for practical skills may describe a task to be done, and the assessors guide should generally list the stages of the task and the details the assessor should check off as they are done. Where order is important, this should be mentioned. A checklist may be provided as permanent record, or a video may be taken. In some cases there will be a product which can be retained as long term evidence along with the paperwork or database records.

== See also ==
- Educational assessment – Educational evaluation method
- Test (assessment) – Educational assessment
- Skill – Ability to carry out a task
