= Lybrate =

Indian healthcare technology company

- Type: Private
- Industry: Healthcare
- Founders: Saurabh Arora; Rahul Narang
- Headquarters: New Delhi, India

Lybrate is a mobile healthcare technology company that developed an online platform to connect doctors and patients. The company was founded in 2013 and is headquartered in Delhi, India. The service allows patients to connect with the doctor online through a video call or schedule an appointment and can get info about medication.

== History ==
The service was founded in July 2013 by Saurabh Arora and formerly worked at Facebook in the United States and Rahul Narang, former professionals of Snapdeal. Arora and Narang teamed up to create an online platform to connect patients with doctors and eliminate self-medication in India. They started building the company with their own funds and in August 2014, they raised $1.23 million seed funding from Nexus Venture Partners. In July 2015, Lybrate raised $10.2 million Series A funding led by Tiger Global, Nexus and Ratan Tata, Chairman Emeritus of Tata Sons to scale technology and operations, develop products and recruit talent. In 2015, Lybrate collaborated with Indian Medical Association as digital partner to educate doctors, incorporate technology in their practice for communicating with patients.

== Products and services ==
Lybrate was initially launched to connect people with healthcare professionals, allowing them to book appointments with doctors using the web portal and mobile application. In May 2016, Lybrate launch Lybrate Lab+, an online lab testing service that allows a patient sample to be collected right from their home, with results later shared online. It also provides patient management services for doctors, and remote doctor-patient consultancy. The service currently has over 1 lakh (100,000) certified doctors available and connect patients with medical care professionals.
