= Ibibo =

Online travel organisation, subsidiary of MakeMyTrip Limited

Ibibo Group
- Type: Private
- Industry: Online Travel
- Founded: 2007; 19 years ago
- Founder: Ashish Kashyap
- Headquarters: Gurugram, Haryana, India
- Key people: Parikshit Choudhry (CBO); Sunil Suresh (CMO); Vikalp Sahni (CTO); Yuvaraj Srivastava (CHRO); Pankaj Jain (CFO)
- Products: Flight, holiday, bus and train bookings
- Parent: Naspers (until 2016); MakeMyTrip (2016–present)
- Website: goibibo.com

Ibibo Group is an online Indian travel organization founded in January 2007 by Ashish Kashyap. The company is a subsidiary of MakeMyTrip (MMT) Limited, which owns a 100% stake in Ibibo Group.

The group owns the B2C online travel aggregator Goibibo, and online bus ticketing platform RedBus.in.

On 31 January 2017, MakeMyTrip (MMT) acquired the ibibo Group by purchasing 100% equity interest in the ibibo Group from MIH Internet, an indirect subsidiary of Naspers, pursuant to a Transaction Agreement dated 18 October 2016.

== History ==
Ibibo started as a social networking service in 2007, and later changed to become an e-commerce and travel organisation. In 2009 Goibibo.com was launched.

== Acquisition and investments ==
=== Bixee ===
Bixee is a former job search engine for India, and an example of both vertical search and metasearch (not to be confused with Bixby, Samsung's voice assistant). It was launched in late 2005. The company also launched Pixrat, which is a social photo bookmarking service. Bixee was acquired by ibibo, the Indian arm of the South African media giant Naspers, in December 2006.

=== Goibibo ===
Goibibo was launched in 2009 and is part of ibibo Group. It was co-founded by Sanjay Bhasin and Vikalp Sahni. Goibibo is India's largest hotels aggregator and also one of the leading air aggregator.

=== PayU India ===
In 2011, Ibibo rolled out its payment gateway innovation called PayU in the Indian market, to permit websites to integrate e-commerce transactions through online payments. With PayU, a business can process payment by using credit cards and debit cards (for more than 50 banks), and online banking for banks including ICICI, HDFC, SBI, and Axis Bank. PayU provides an API for integration and transaction analytics to improve the speed and security of payment processing. PayU India launched of a first-of-its kind premium deferral payment facility for consumers 'LazyPay' aimed at those who transact digitally for any amount between ₹500 and ₹2,500 and is an option to pay later.

=== redbus.in ===
Redbus.in became a part of ibibo group via a 100% acquisition in June 2013. redBus is India's most popular online bus ticketing platform, both on mobile and on desktop. The business also owns BOGDS, a cloud computing service for bus operators, and SeatSeller, a GDS for bus inventory distribution.

redBus has started its carpooling and bike pooling platform called rPool in Delhi.

=== YourBus ===
In March 2014, ibibo Group acquired Bangalore-based bus tracking startup YourBus. YourBus, founded by BITS-Pilani graduates from Rajesh Mallipeddi and Satya Padmanabham in 2011, is a GPS-based bus tracking and analytics platform. The YourBus application on a smartphone shows users the location of a bus in real time on a map. It also tells the users about the arrival time at their pick-up point along with SMS updates.

=== Djubo ===
In August 2015 ibibo Group bought a minority stake in cloud-based hotel services startup Djubo for an undisclosed amount. Djubo, founded in February 2015 by Tarun Gulati and Sankalp Goel, manages hotel bookings for over 100 hotels through a single interface.

=== redbus.pe and redbus.co ===
In July 2016 Redbus acquired Peru-based bus tracking startup Busportal. In 2017, they founded a chapter of Redbus in Colombia.

The company received ₹10.7 Crores infusion of funding from its Singapore-based parent company, Ibibo Group Holdings. Prior to this, in November 2019, It had also received ₹71.73 Crores.

== Merger ==
In October 2016, India based online travel company MakeMyTrip, a Nasdaq listed firm and ibibo Group, India's largest travel group agreed to merge in a stock transaction, to form the country's biggest online travel company. Both these online platforms have AI-powered chatbots named Myra and Gia respectively.
