= Ixigo =

Indian online travel company

ixigo
- Website type: Public
- Traded as: NSE: IXIGO; BSE: 544192
- Founded: June 2007; 19 years ago
- Headquarters: Gurgaon, Haryana, India
- Owner: Le Travenues Technology Ltd
- Founders: Aloke Bajpai; Rajnish Kumar
- Key people: Aloke Bajpai (Chairman, MD & Group CEO); Rajnish Kumar (Director & Group Co-CEO)
- Industry: Online travel agency
- Revenue: ▲₹655 crore (US$70 million) (FY24)
- Net income: ▲₹73 crore (US$7.8 million) (FY24)
- Subsidiaries: AbhiBus; Confirmtkt
- Website: ixigo.com ixigo.com/flights

ixigo (pronounced "ik-si-go") is an Indian online travel portal headquartered in Gurgaon. Launched in 2007, ixigo aggregates real-time travel information, prices and availability for flights, trains, buses, and hotels, and allows ticket booking through its associate websites and apps.

== History ==
ixigo (Le Travenues Technology, Pvt. Ltd.) was started by IITK alumni Rajnish Kumar and Aloke Bajpai in June 2007, with the launch of their flights metasearch website. In 2008, it introduced a hotel search engine on its website.

In early 2014 ixigo launched its train ticket booking app.

In February 2021, ixigo acquired the train discovery and ticketing platform Confirmtkt in a cash and stock deal. In August 2021, ixigo acquired the bus ticket booking and fleet management portal AbhiBus in a cash and stock deal.

The company went public in June 2024, listing on NSE and BSE.

== Funding ==
In August 2011, ixigo received $18.5 million investment from SAIF Partners and MakeMyTrip. In June 2015, smartphone maker Micromax Informatics invested an undisclosed amount in ixigo. In March 2017, ixigo closed a funding of $15 million in Series B round by venture capital firm Sequoia Capital India and Fosun RZ Capital.

In July 2021, it raised US$53 million in its pre-IPO round led by GIC with participation from investors including Orios Venture Partners, Trifecta Capital, Info Edge Ventures, among others.
