= Keka HR =

Software company

- Industry: Software
- Founded: 21 July 2014
- Founders: Vijay Yalamanchili (CEO)
- Headquarters: Hyderabad, Telangana, India
- Products: Human resource management Payroll automation
- Website: Official website

Keka HR is a software company that provides cloud-based human resource management and payroll automation software.

Keka HR specializes in providing business services in the field of HR technology, payroll automation, recruiting, leave, attendance and performance management.

The company was founded by Vijay Yalamanchili on July 21, 2014. The company is headquartered in Hyderabad, with operations in Singapore and the United States.

== History ==
Keka HR was established in 2014 in Hyderabad, Telangana, India. In 2015, the company entered the Indian HR market and received the HYSEA Startup Award.

By 2019, Keka HR had surpassed $1 million in annual recurring revenue (ARR). During the COVID-19 pandemic in 2020, the company reported a sevenfold increase in sales.

By 2021, the company had raised $1.6 million through Recur Club. In 2022, Keka HR secured $57 million in Series A funding from West Bridge Capital.

The company's headquarters are located in Gachibowli, Hyderabad, with offices in Singapore and Seattle, Washington.
