= Zostel =

Indian Hospitality company

- Type: Privately held company
- Industry: Hostel; Tourism; Backpacker tourism
- Founded: 2013; 13 years ago
- Headquarters: Gurgaon
- Area served: India, Nepal, Thailand and Europe
- Products: Zostel Hostels; Zostel Homes; Zostel Escape; Trusted by Zostel
- Website: www.zostel.com

Zostel is an Indian multinational hostel chain with over 95 locations across India, Nepal, Thailand and Europe.

== History ==
Zostel Hospitality Pvt. Ltd was established in August 2013 by seven co-founders, who initiated their venture with the launch of the first Zostel in Jodhpur, Rajasthan on 15 August 2013.

=== ZO Rooms ===
In November 2014, the founders launched a new project called ZO Rooms, which aimed to provide budget-friendly hotel accommodations and aggregate hotel rooms. There were reports that ZO Rooms was acquired by rival OYO Rooms, in an all-stock deal in December 2015, which was later denied by OYO.

Zostel offers various accommodation options such as dormitories and private rooms.

=== ZO World ===
In 2025, on its 12th anniversary, Zostel announced the launch of “Zo World,” a travel-tech platform extending beyond hostel operations. Zo World includes several parts:

- Zo Trips, a travel planning service that covers flights and local activities, with a projected annual revenue of ₹1,500 crore
- Zo Villas, a network of around 300 vacation homes
- Zo Houses, co-living accommodations aimed at digital nomads and creators
- Zo Digital, an artificial intelligence system designed to provide rewards and community engagement features.

=== Business Structure and Financials ===
Zostel operates through a franchisee-owned, franchisee-operated (FOFO) model, where individual franchisees own and manage each property according to the company’s guidelines. The company charges a commission of 21–30% on booking and food and beverage revenue from its franchisees, and provides operational support and guidance. According to reports, Zostel records annual accommodation bookings of about ₹166 crore (approximately US$20 million), with an estimated year-on-year growth of 40–50%. The strategy of the company is to focus on smaller urban areas across India, including Tier-II, Tier-III, and Tier-IV cities, rather than concentrating only on major tourist hubs.
