= Yatra (company) =

Online travel agency

- Type: Public
- Traded as: Nasdaq: YTRA; NSE: YATRA; BSE: 543992
- Industry: Online travel agency
- Founded: 1 August 2006; 20 years ago
- Founders: Dhruv Shringi; Manish Amin; Sabina Chopra
- Headquarters: Gurgaon, Haryana, India
- Key people: Dhruv Shringi (CEO); Manish Amin (CIO); Yumnam Prabhakar Singh (COO - Corporate Hotels)
- Products: Flights, hotels, holidays, trains, buses
- Services: Travel booking
- Revenue: ▲₹422 crore (US$44 million) (FY24)
- Operating income: ▼₹53 crore (US$5.5 million) (FY24)
- Net income: ▼₹−4.5 crore (US$−470,000) (FY24)
- Website: www.yatra.com

Yatra is an Indian online travel agency and travel search engine.

== History ==
Yatra.com was founded by Dhruv Shringi, Manish Amin and Sabina Chopra in August 2006.

Early investors included Reliance Venture Asset Management Ltd, Web18 of Network18 Group (a subsidiary of Reliance Industries), Norwest Venture Partners and Intel Capital. In April 2011, it announced funding of ₹2 billion (US$43 million) from investors including Valiant Capital Management, Norwest Venture Partners (NVP) under Promod Haque's management and Intel Capital.

In April 2012, it became the second-largest online travel service in India, with a 30 percent share of online travel-related transactions. It launched “holiday-cum-shopping card” with State Bank of India (SBI).

In September 2013, Yatra.com suffered a data breach of more than 5 million users records, exposing email and physical addresses, dates of birth and phone numbers along with both PINs and passwords stored in plain text.

In November 2013, Yatra.com launched e-gift cards in collaboration with Qwikcilver.

In December 2016, Yatra.com was publicly listed on the NASDAQ under the ticker symbol "YTRA".

In July 2019, Ebix, a US-based company, planned to acquire Yatra.com but the acquisition was cancelled in June 2020.

In June 2020, Yatra.com announced an underwritten public offering at $11.5 mn and laid off about 400 employees around the same time.

In June 2021, Yatra collaborated with Oyo Rooms, Airbnb, and EaseMyTrip to form the Confederation of Hospitality, Technology and Tourism Industry (CHATT), an industry body for the tourism sector of India.

In 2023, Yatra Online listed on the Indian stock exchanges after its initial public offering.

== Acquisitions ==
Yatra acquired ticket consolidator Travel Services International (TSI) in October 2010, global distribution system provider Magicdom and Indian events and entertainment portal BuzzInTown. All were acquired for undisclosed amounts. In July 2012, Yatra.com acquired a 100% stake in Travelguru. In 2016, Yatra.com acquired-hired Mumbai-based Travel-logs.in, which specializes in customized city walks and private tours.

In September 2024, Yatra announced the acquisition of corporate travel company Globe Travels for ₹128 crore.
