= MakeMyTrip =

Indian online travel company

MakeMyTrip Limited

- Screenshot of mobile application
- Type: Public
- Traded as: Nasdaq: MMYT
- Industry: Online travel
- Founded: 2000; 26 years ago
- Founder: Deep Kalra
- Headquarters: Gurgaon, Haryana, India
- Area served: Worldwide
- Key people: Deep Kalra (Founder & chairman); Rajesh Magow (Co-founder and Group CEO); Sanjay Mohan (Group CTO); Mohit Kabra (Group COO)
- Products: Booking flights, hotels, holidays, buses, trains and cars
- Revenue: ▲US$978 million (FY2025)
- Number of employees: 5,122 (2025)
- Website: www.makemytrip.com

MakeMyTrip Limited is an Indian online travel company, headquartered in Gurgaon. Founded in 2000, it operates an online travel-booking platform for travel services such as airline tickets, hotel reservations, holiday packages, and rail and bus tickets.

In 2016, MakeMyTrip acquired the Ibibo Group, which owned sites such as Goibibo and Redbus.in.

== History ==
MakeMyTrip was founded by Deep Kalra in 2000, initially targeting the United States market with a focus on itineraries between the U.S. and India for the Indian diaspora. In September 2005, it began operations in India with online airline ticketing and later expanded into holiday packages and hotel reservations.

MakeMyTrip Limited listed on the Nasdaq on 17 September 2010 following an initial public offering, raising approximately US$80.5 million at a valuation of $478 million. It was the first IPO by an Indian company in the U.S. since July 2006.

In 2011, the company acquired Luxury Tours and Travel Pte Ltd (Singapore), ITC Group's travel business, and ETB Group—expanding its presence in Southeast Asia and parts of Europe. In 2012, it introduced RoutePlanner, a tool for searching routes and modes within India. In September 2014, it established a US$15 million innovation fund to invest in sector start-ups.

In April 2015, MakeMyTrip acquired MyGola; the deal was made through the innovation fund. In July 2015, MakeMyTrip invested in the travel information and hotel review portal HolidayIQ and picked up approximately 30% stake in the company. In the same month, it invested $5 million in a startup called Bona Vita. Search My Trip

In January 2016, the China-based travel booking company Ctrip agreed to invest $180 million in MakeMyTrip. Later that year, MakeMyTrip and Ibibo Group, India's largest travel booking portals, merged via a stock swap. Naspers became the largest shareholder of MakeMyTrip after the transaction. In 2019, Ctrip increased its stake in MakeMyTrip to 49% by acquiring 42% of the company from Naspers through a stock swap transaction. As a result, Naspers obtained a 5.6% stake in Ctrip worth $1.3 billion.

The company acquired the Mumbai-based corporate travel management company Quest2Travel for an undisclosed amount in 2019. The company launched myPartner in 2020, a platform for travel agents. In May 2021, the company partnered with ⁣Amazon Pay for providing travel services on Amazon. In April 2022, TripMoney, the fintech arm of MakeMyTrip, announced the acquisition of BookMyForex, an online foreign exchange services provider.

In 2023, MakeMyTrip began integrating generative AI features into its platform, such as voice-assisted booking in Indian languages and AI-generated summaries of hotel reviews. In January 2024, the company announced an agreement to acquire the expense-management platform Happay from CRED. In 2025, it released an updated version of its virtual assistant, Myra. Also in 2025, the company mapped more than 2,000 hotels and homestays near over 100 national parks in India.

In 2025, MakeMyTrip repurchased over 34 million Class B shares held by Trip.com Group, reducing the latter's shareholding in the company from 45.34% to 16.90%.

== Products and services ==
MakeMyTrip provides flight, hotel, bus, and train ticket booking, as well as holiday packages. The company launched mobile applications for booking travel in 2012. As of June 2023, the company had 146 active franchisees.

Following its founding in 2000, MakeMyTrip's initial service was air ticketing for travel to and from India. A significant expansion occurred in 2017 when the company merged with Ibibo Group, the parent company of rival travel site Goibibo.

The company's hotel booking service, operated through MMTand Goibibo, was launched in 2005. As of 2020, it had over 60,000 accommodation properties in India and 5,00,000 outside the country listed on its site.

Its bus ticketing operations are primarily handled through its subsidiary, redBus, an online bus ticketing platform which it acquired from the Ibibo Group. redBus partners with bus operators in India, South America, and Southeast Asia.

MakeMyTrip also operates TripMoney, a fintech arm offering foreign exchange services, travel insurance, and travel-related financial products. In 2022, TripMoney acquired BookMyForex, an online foreign exchange platform. The company offers car rental services for airport transfers, local sightseeing, and intercity travel. In 2025, MakeMyTrip launched an updated version of its AI-powered virtual assistant, Myra, which handles over 55,000 daily conversations in multiple Indian languages across the travel booking lifecycle.

== Market position ==
MakeMyTrip is the largest online travel agency in India, with its primary competitors being EaseMyTrip, Cleartrip (owned by Flipkart), Yatra, and Ixigo.

== Controversies ==
=== Anti-competitive practices in selling hotel inventories ===
On 30 March 2026, A US-based short-seller, Morpheus Research, has alleged that MakeMyTrip continues to indirectly control displayed hotel prices through a rebranded “price competitiveness score” and “deboosting” (burying non-compliant hotels in search results), circumventing the Competition Commission of India’s 2022 ruling and ₹223 crore (US$24 million) fine against explicit price-parity clauses. Backed by interviews with over 100 insiders, hotel executives, and bodies like The Federation of Hotel & Restaurant Associations of India, the report claims these tactics pressure properties to offer MakeMyTrip the lowest rates to maintain visibility and bookings, with evidence of lingering parity language in a Goibibo contract exposed in August 2025; it also flags an undisclosed new CCI probe opened in March 2024 into a potential “hub-and-spoke” cartel.
