= Rapido (company) =

Indian online bike taxi aggregator

- Formerly: theKarrier
- Type: Private
- Industry: Transportation
- Founded: 2015; 11 years ago
- Founders: Aravind Sanka; Pavan Guntupalli; SR Rishikesh
- Headquarters: Bengaluru, Karnataka, India
- Number of locations: 100+ cities (2022)
- Area served: India
- Services: Bike taxi Auto rickshaw Taxicab; Third-party logistics
- Revenue: ▲₹648 crore (US$69 million) (FY24)
- Website: rapido.bike

Rapido is an Indian ride-hailing service, which primarily operates as a bike taxi aggregator. Its offerings also include auto rickshaw and taxicab hailing, parcel delivery, and third-party logistics services.

Founded in 2015, the company is based in Bengaluru and operates in over 100 cities as of 2022. It has faced legal troubles in several locations where bike taxis are illegal.

== History ==
The company was founded in 2015 as theKarrier by two IIT alumni and a PESU alumnus – Aravind Sanka, Pavan Guntupalli, and SR Rishikesh respectively. In September 2018, reports were that Rapido has over 15,000 registered riders, with an average rides of 30,000 per day. Subsequently in 2016, Hero MotoCorp chairman Pawan Munjal and former Google India head Rajan Anandan acquired stakes in the company.

In 2019, Rapido co-founder Aravind Sanka claimed that the company has created more than 500,000 jobs in India. In November 2019, the company claimed to have 1 crore registered users.

After the breakout of the COVID-19 pandemic in India, Rapido expanded its operations in logistics, providing last-mile delivery of goods for local businesses and e-commerce companies. In October 2020, Rapido launched on-demand auto rickshaw hailing services.

In April 2022, the company received $180 million in a funding round led by Swiggy, raising the company's valuation to $830 million. The Series D round of funding also saw participation of TVS Motor Company, Westbridge, Shell Ventures, and Nexus Ventures.

In 2023, Rapido introduced taxicab hailing on its app.

In September 2024, Rapido became a unicorn after raising $200 million in its Series E round at a $1.1 billion valuation.

In August 2025, Rapido launched its food delivery app called Ownly.

== Business model ==
The Rapido app allows the user to book a ride, after which a rider (called "Captain") arrives at the location. The fare includes a base fare of ₹20 in addition to ₹3 for every kilometer of the ride. The "Captains" need to register through the Rapido-Captain app and get validated by submitting the required documents. They can use motorcycles, scooters, or e-bikes, but the vehicle cannot be older than 2010.

== Legal issues ==
Rapido has run into legal troubles in various cities. In October 2018, several bikes were seized in Coimbatore as Rapido was operating without a permit from the transport department. In July 2019, Madras High Court banned Rapido's operations across Tamil Nadu, while the Rapido iOS application was removed from the App Store for violating local laws. In August 2019, the court lifted the ban and allowed the company to resume services in the state until the state government framed new regulations for bike taxi services.

In February 2019, more than 200 bike taxis belonging to Rapido and Ola Cabs were seized in Bangalore as the state transport department declared bike taxis to be illegal. In April 2019, more than 170 Rapido bikes were impounded and an investigation was launched against Rapido by the city cyber crime police. Despite the ban, the company was reported to be illegally operating in Bangalore, with Rapido Captains disguised as food delivery executives.

In February 2020, Rapido was banned across Assam, after the transport department found that the company was operating without commercial license or permit from the DTO. In October 2020, shortly after it commenced operations in Mumbai, the city's transport authorities asked the company to stop its services as it was operating without the government's permission.

In January 2022, RTO officials in Bangalore seized over 120 Rapido bikes, after receiving complaints from the city's cab and auto rickshaw unions. In February 2022, Pune RTO officials seized 65 motorbikes belonging to Rapido riders, declaring bike taxi operations to be illegal in the state of Maharashtra.
