= PedidosYa =

Uruguayan online food service

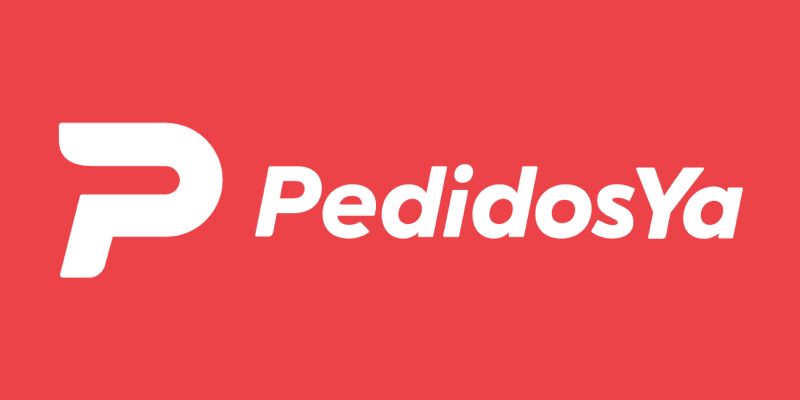

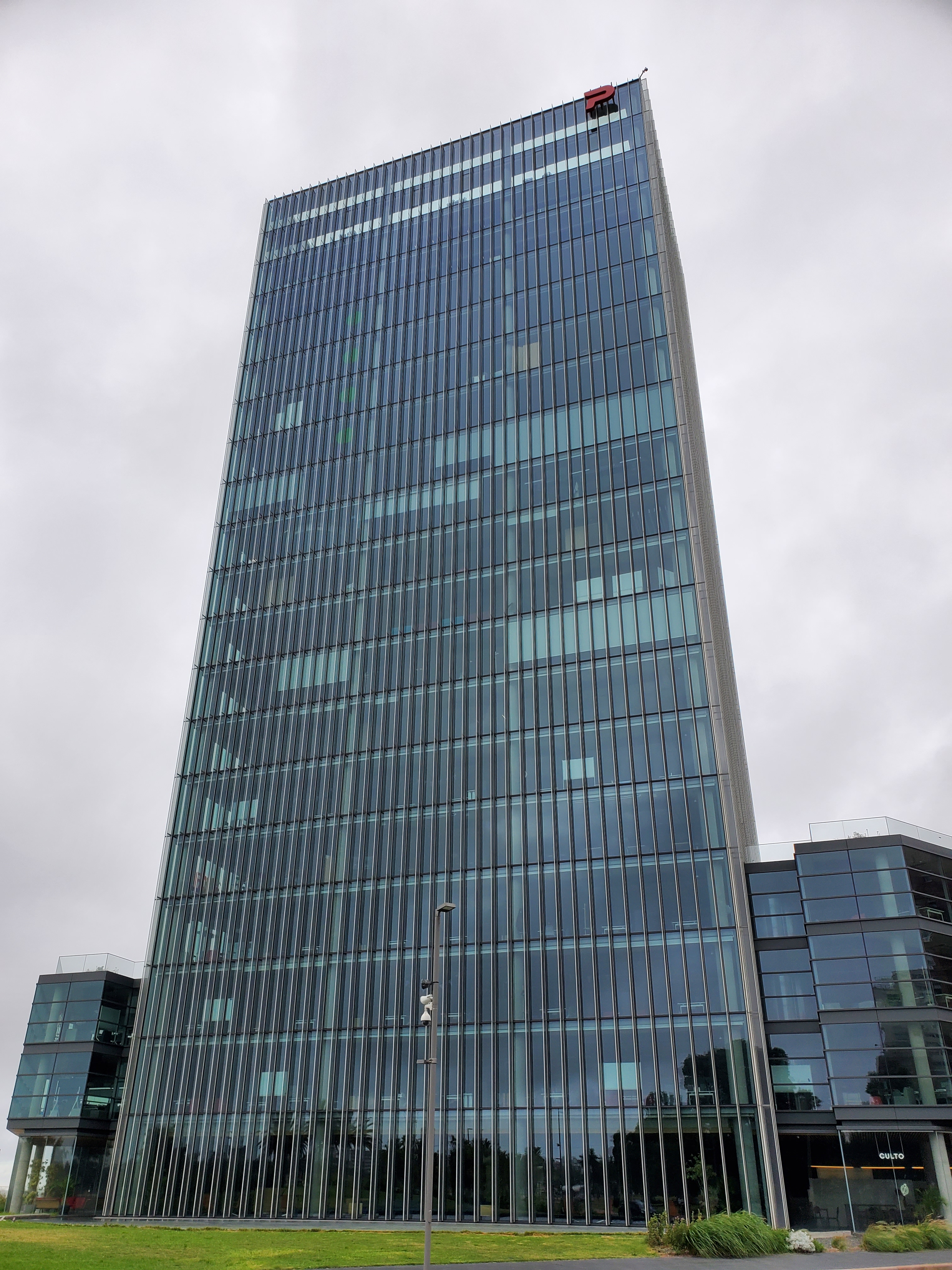
- Founded: 2009
- Type: Private company
- Headquarters: Montevideo, Uruguay
- Services: Food; Q-commerce; Financial technology
- Owner: Delivery Hero
- Key people: • CEO: Esteban Gutiérrez • CIO: Sebastián Genesio • CMO: Santiago Minorini • CTO: Juan Martín Sotuyo • COO: Juan Martín López • CPO (Chief People Officer): Alejandra Kabakián • CPO (Chief Product Officer): Leandro Malandrini • CFO (Chief Financial Officer): Pablo Setuain
- Employees: 5,000 employees
- Website: PedidosYa

PedidosYa is a Uruguayan multinational company for online food ordering and quick commerce, headquartered in Montevideo. Founded in 2009 and merged with Delivery Hero, as of 2025 the company operates in fifteen Latin American countries.

== History ==
PedidosYa was founded in 2009 by Ariel Burschtin, Álvaro García, and Ruben Sosenke, who were then students at Universidad ORT Uruguay. They had presented the idea of a website to easily order chivitos as part of a university project in 2008, aiming to bring together available food providers and segment them by location and type of cuisine.

After presenting the project to the National Agency for Research and Innovation of Uruguay, which awarded them a US$20,000 subsidy, the first prototype of the online platform was launched in 2009 in Uruguay, featuring 40 restaurants. Additionally, the National Development Agency, through the Fondo Emprender, provided an initial capital of US$50,000. PedidosYa was conceived as a platform that allowed consumers to place orders online —via smartphones or computers— from restaurants offering home delivery services.

In 2011, PedidosYa launched its mobile app for iOS and Android. The company also secured investments from the London-based venture capital firm Atomico and Kaszek. That year marked the beginning of its international expansion, starting with operations in Argentina and Chile.

In 2014, PedidosYa was majority-acquired by Delivery Hero, a global online food ordering service company with presence in 70 countries worldwide.

In 2016 it began to allow online payments. In June 2017, it was listed on the Frankfurt Stock Exchange with a value of US$ 5,140 million.

The company continued its expansion into Bolivia in 2018, the Dominican Republic, and Paraguay in 2019; and Venezuela in 2020.

In 2019, PedidosYa reached a valuation of $1 billion (unicorn) based on its sales multiples and participation within the DH group. In 2020, PedidosYa acquired Glovo's operations in Latin America.

In April 2020, within the framework of the COVID-19 pandemic, the company opened the first PedidosYa Market dark stores in Buenos Aires, Santiago, and Montevideo.

In September, PedidosYa acquired Glovo's operations in Latin America, following its acquisition by Delivery Hero.

In 2021, PedidosYa began operations in Peru. In March of the same year, it began operations in Guatemala, reaching a valuation of $3 billion. In 2022, PedidosYa established its presence in 15 Latin American countries. The same year, it launched its subscription program PedidosYa Plus, the pick-up service at merchants, and the financial tool PedidosYa Créditos to support partner businesses. In March 2025, PedidosYa was designated as a global technology center by its parent company, Delivery Hero. From this hub, with a projected investment of $87 million in 2025, digital solutions will be developed for e-commerce platforms in 70 countries, reaching an estimated market of 2 billion people. In July 2025, the company announced the launch of a new version of the application with a technology investment of $87 million.

== Business units ==
=== Food delivery service ===
The Food Delivery unit specializes in home food delivery. This service allows users to order dishes from restaurants and receive them at their location through a digital platform.

=== Q-commerce ===
Q-Commerce focuses on rapid delivery of daily consumer products, such as food, beverages, and pharmacy items. This model is based on proprietary digital supermarkets, known as PedidosYa Market, that operate exclusively through the application and are strategically located to make deliveries within an estimated timeframe of 10 to 20 minutes. The logistics system of these digital stores is based on real-time inventory. The company promotes a food waste-free policy. This initiative is based on a rescue and donation program for products suitable for consumption that are close to leaving the commercial channel and cannot be commercialized. These foods are delivered to social organizations through a network of food banks in the 15 countries where the company operates. Through its product rescue and donation program, PedidosYa has donated more than 5 million meal servings in Latin America, including more than one million in Argentina. According to the company, the program aims to reduce food waste and collaborate with social organizations.

=== Financial technology ===
PedidosYa Créditos is the Fintech business unit launched in 2025, aimed at promoting financial and digital inclusion in Latin America. This initiative seeks to offer financial solutions to merchants, delivery drivers, and users, facilitating their integration into the digital ecosystem and reducing dependence on cash.

== Corporate policies, advertising, and cultural impact ==
The company has implemented internal policies focused on labor flexibility and benefits for its staff and policies to increase female representation, achieving 47.6% female participation in its workforce and 38.6% in leadership roles. Programs such as "Mujeres Tech" and scholarships in partnership with Henry Academy seek to reduce the gender gap in tech industry.

The campaign "World Cup Delivery," launched during the 2022 FIFA World Cup, won 11 awards at the Cannes Lions International Festival of Creativity in 2023.

In 2025, PedidosYa was one of the brands organically integrated into the Argentine television series El Eternauta. Inga, one of the characters, is a PedidosYa delivery worker who becomes trapped alongside the series’ protagonists. Following the premiere, actress Orianna Cárdenas took part in a campaign with the brand.

== Locations ==
As of September 2025, PedidosYa operated in 15 countries across Latin America.

- Argentina
- Bolivia
- Chile
- Costa Rica
- Dominican Republic
- Ecuador
- El Salvador
- Guatemala
- Honduras
- Nicaragua
- Panama
- Paraguay
- Peru
- Uruguay
- Venezuela
