= Talabat =

Kuwaiti food and grocery delivery company

- Website type: E-commerce
- Available in: English, Arabic
- Founded: 2004
- Area served: Kuwait; Bahrain; United Arab Emirates; Oman; Qatar; Jordan; Egypt; Iraq
- Owner: Delivery Hero SE
- Founder: Abdulaziz Al Loughani
- CEO: Tomaso Rodriguez
- Industry: Internet
- Services: Online food ordering, Food delivery
- Employees: >16,000
- Website: www.talabat.com

Talabat (Arabic: طلبات, romanized: Ṭalabāt) is an online food ordering company founded in Kuwait in 2004. As of April 2021, It operates across several Middle Eastern countries including Kuwait, Bahrain, the United Arab Emirates, Oman, Qatar, Jordan, Egypt, and Iraq. Since 2016, Talabat has been a subsidiary of Delivery Hero, a German multinational online food delivery company.

== History ==
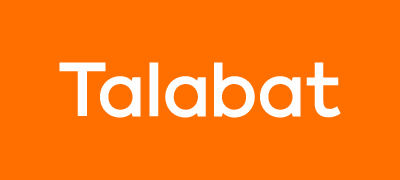
Previous logo

A Talabat driver in Bahrain.

In 2001, four Kuwaiti students in Cairo developed the idea for a company modeled on the Egyptian food ordering service Otlob. In 2004, they founded Talabat General Trading and Contracting Company in Kuwait. The name "Talabat" derives from the Arabic language and it means "orders" or "requests".

In 2008 and 2009, Talabat received the “Best E-Business” award in Kuwait. with recognition presented by the Emir of Kuwait, Sabah Al-Ahmad Al-Jaber Al-Sabah.

In 2009, the business was operating out of Kuwait and Saudi Arabia with an average of 1,250 daily transactions. Talabat then underwent changes such as the re-branding from 6alabat.com to Talabat.com, a shift from a hybrid form of Arabic and English spelling to a pure English spelling.

In 2011, the company introduced a new website layout and changes to the user interface.

In 2012, Talabat began operating in Bahrain, United Arab Emirates, and Oman.

In 2013, it began operating in Qatar.

In 2015, Talabat was acquired by the global German e-commerce group Rocket Internet for US$170 million. It became part of Rocket Internet's business unit Global Online Takeaway Group.

In 2016, Rocket Internet's food delivery business, including Talabat, was taken over by online food marketplace Delivery Hero. In line with this acquisition, Abdulhamid Alomar took over as the CEO of the company.

In 2017, Talabat launched operations in Jordan.

In 2019, former Grab executive Tomaso Rodriguez was appointed as CEO, after the stepping down of Abdulhamid Alomar.

Lawsuits were filed against the company after they were found violating fair competition rules in Kuwait. A settlement plea made by Talabat was also turned down.

In January 2020, the food delivery company Carriage, also owned by Delivery Hero, was absorbed by Talabat.

In August 2020, it had been confirmed that the Egyptian food delivery service Otlob, which was in operation since 1999, had become a Delivery Hero subsidiary in 2016. It is getting rebranded as Talabat. As of September 2020, Talabat operates in Egypt.

In December 2020, Talabat’s app was added to the Huawei marketplace.

In 2021, Talabat was launched in Erbil in the Kurdistan Region, competing against Lezzoo there, before expanding to cities in Iraq, such as Baghdad, Sulaymaniyah, Duhok, Zakho, Basra, and Najaf.

In August 2021, Talabat was named the official food delivery provider for Expo 2020. Its pavilion presented concepts such as the cloud kitchen and featured multiple food brands. In September 2021, Talabat and Terminus Group introduced ten autonomous food delivery robots for use by Expo 2020 visitors. Expo 2020 itself launched on October 2021 following a year-long delay due to the COVID-19 pandemic. While Talabat previously operated in Saudi Arabia, it no longer does. Users in Saudi Arabia are now redirected to HungerStation, another Delivery Hero subsidiary that serves the Saudi market.
