= Rohit Chadda =

Indian businessman

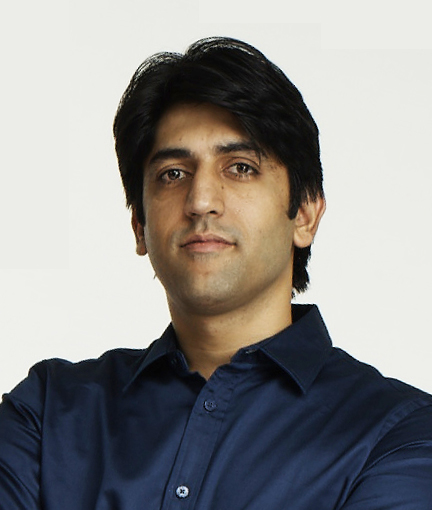
- Rohit Chadda
- Born: 26 August 1982 (age 44); India
- Education: Indian Institute of Management Calcutta, Delhi Technological University
- Occupations: CEO, Investment Banker, Entrepreneur
- Title: President & COO - Times Network, CEO - ZEE Digital, Co-founder - foodpanda & Founder - Paylo
- Website: rohitchadda.com

Rohit Chadda (born 26 August 1982) is an Indian investment banker and entrepreneur, who is the President & COO of Times Network. He leads the tech business portfolio and AI transformation of Times Group covering verticals like media tech, OTT, fintech, health tech, edu tech, ecommerce, gaming and sports. Previously, CEO of the digital business at Essel Group (Zee Entertainment, Zee Media and DNA), he was the co-founder of online food ordering platform Foodpanda. He is also the founder of omni-channel digital payments platform PayLo. He has been attributed for the turnaround of Zee Digital driving 4x growth in 2 years and bringing Zee's digital business to the second position on ComScore from ninth position making Zee the second largest digital media group in India. He has been featured among Top Tech CEOs of the decade (2010–2020) in India and was featured among Fortune 40 under 40 in 2015.

== Education and early career ==
Chadda graduated from Delhi Technological University (formerly Delhi College of Engineering) with a degree in computer engineering and worked as a software engineer for Computer Sciences Corporation. In 2007 he joined Indian Institute of Management Calcutta to do his MBA after which he worked at Merrill Lynch as an investment banker in United Kingdom. He took an internal transfer to India in 2011.

== Career ==
=== Foodpanda ===
Chadda began his career in 2012 when he co-founded foodpanda. Foodpanda expanded to around 40 countries before being bought by Delivery Hero. Before foodpanda got popular, he joked that he delivered pizza for a living. Foodpanda had raised a total investment of over US$300 million till 2015. Chadda in the middle of 2015 stepped down from day-to-day responsibilities at Foodpanda to launch his digital payments startup. Foodpanda was acquired by its global competitor Delivery Hero in 2016.

=== Paylo ===
In 2015, he launched an omni-channel digital payments platform PayLo which acquired the in-restaurant payments app Ruplee in March 2016 for an undisclosed sum. PayLo was successful in the wake of demonetisation in India and expanded pan-India before being acquired by Immortal Technologies. Chadda believes that execution is more important than the idea to make a startup successful and the key challenge for experienced professionals to work in a startup environment is to unlearn what they have previously learned. PayLo acquired Ruplee before being itself acquired by Immortal Technologies.

=== Zee Group ===
Chadda took over as CEO of digital publishing of Zee Group in May 2019. Since 2017, he had led global product and strategy for Zee Group launching ZEE5, the flagship OTT of Zee Entertainment, across 170+ countries. Since June 2019, Zee Digital, the online arm of the Zee group, has registered the highest growth year-on-year among the top media publishers in India. Times Internet Limited, Network 18 Group, and India Today Group have grown by 45%, 21%, and 22% respectively from June 2020 over June 2019 while Zee Digital witnessed a growth of 123% over the same period. Zee Digital achieved its first milestone in September 2019 by crossing 100 million unique monthly visitors and was ranked 6th in the news and information category on ComScore India rankings at the time. Later in the month of March 2020 it crossed 150 million unique monthly visitors mark moving to 4th position. Further in May 2020 Zee Digital moved to 3rd position by crossing 185 million unique monthly visitors mark before finally ranking 2nd position in June 2020 in the ComScore rankings among all digital media groups in India.

Chadda has led the transformation of the business of Zee Digital by scaling it to over 200 million users from 60 million users making it the second-largest digital media group in India. He attributes the growth from rank 9 to rank 2 in one year to the data and technology driven approach to content and the focus on vernacular languages. During his tenure, Zee Digital launched 8 new brand websites and 3 new languages to expand the product portfolio to 20 brands and 12 languages. During the US elections in November 2020, Zee Digital launched the English global news channel WION through a digital first approach across Asia Pacific, Middle East, UK and North America.

Chadda launched Zee's UGC short video platform HiPi in the midst of the TikTok ban in India. Hipi was first launched within ZEE5 app ecosystem to capitalise on the reach of the OTT platform. After the success of the POC, he launched a standalone app for HiPi. HiPi is a short video platform that provides a complete video creation ecosystem along with news avenues of monetisation to content creators. He plans to use Zee's network reach of 600 million broadcast viewers and 300 million digital users to get creators on HiPi. HiPi launched India's first digital star hunt to allow users to audition for ZEE5 original shows through the short video platform.

=== Times Group ===
Chadda took over as President & COO of Times Network in September 2022. Leading the digital transformation of the group Chadda launched 11 new products in 18 months expanding the group's presence to various verticals in the tech business like fintech, health tech, edu tech, auto tech, OTT, ecommerce and gaming while extending the news vertical into business news, tech news and various vernacular languages. Within 4 months of his stint, in January 2023 he launched the digital platform for ET Now, targeting Gen Z, early jobbers and first time investors and laying the foundation for the fintech expansion for the brand. Since then, the product has expended to Hindi language targeting the larger Indian audience through the launch of ET Now Swadesh and further expanding to fintech business by launching ET Now Advisor, a distribution business focussing to upselling of cards, loans etc. to consumers by educating them and enabling them to make the right choices. ET Now reached 10 million users within the first 20 days of launch and became the No.1 business news channel on YouTube with 200 million views in April and May 2024.

Expanding to health-tech, he launched AI powered daily health companion Health & Me in the presence of actor & fitness enthusiast Milind Soman. Chadda unveiled the auto-tech platform for Times Drive together with Union Minister of Road Transport and Highways, Nitin Gadkari showcasing the AI assisted platform that helps consumers make the right decisions when it comes to their automotive needs. In order to expand the group's presence into tech and gaming, Chadda acquired India's largest and most popular tech magazine Digit along with their digital platforms Digit.in and Skoar.gg in June 2024. Within a year, he was able to turnaround Digit's business with Digit.in becoming the No.1 Tech news platform in India in April 2025. Times Network launched college discovery platform unilist.in to enable students and parents search for the right course and institute for their higher education needs.

With a focus on sports and gaming, Chadda launched India's first Inter-college esports championship under the brand of SKOAR College Gaming Championship. Times Network launched its OTT app Times Play under his leadership. The platform expanded its presence in the US through a partnership with Sling TV. He launched Pickleball Now which is the World's first TV channel focussed on the sport of Pickleball covering tournaments and leagues across the World. The channel has presence on TV and digital platforms and is being distributed to global markets through partnerships with BOTIM, Distro TV, Yupp TV and Rumble. In India, the channel is available on Jio TV, Jio TV+, Airtel Xtream Play, OTT Play, Dailyhunt. Times Group has launched India's Official Pickleball League affiliated with Indian Pickleball Association and Global Pickelball Federation which shall also be streamed live on Pickleball Now from 1st to 7th Dec 2025.

=== Investing and speaking ===
Chadda is a mentor at Esselerator, a Startup accelerator by Subhash Chandra Foundation. Esselerator is an initiative by Subhash Chandra, a billionaire Media baron, to promote and support tech entrepreneurs in domains like Media, Fintech and Education. Its powered by TiE Mumbai. Chadda is an angel investor in multiple technology startups like online school aggregator platform SchoolForSure.com. In 2019, he spoke at DPS to students on starting a business. At the time he remained CEO of Zee group's digital business division.

== Fintech Leadership ==
Chadda has over two decades of fintech experience spanning digital payments, invest-tech, wealth tech and insure-tech. He acquired Ruplee to venture into digital payments and launched India's first omni channel payments platform PayLo. PayLo launched in-store payments, One QR - the first interoperable QR payment solution before UPI and a crypto wallet under his tenure. During his term at Merrill Lynch London's exotic options commidities trading desk in 2008, he built an index arbitrage tool for commodity indices. Later in 2010, after Merrill Lynch was acquired by Bank of America, he built a self serve light exotic options pricing tool for real time price discovery and trading in equity underlyings of DAX, FTSE and other UK and European exchanges. At Times Group, Chadda forayed into wealth tech by acquiring Opigo under the ET Now umbrella to launch ET Now Pro, a platform that brings real time trading calls from SEBI registered RAs to the ET Now consumers. Chadda's first stint in fintech dates to 2005 when he was building PowerSTEPP, a claim management platform for health insurance providers in the US during is tenure at CSC India. Later, during his tenure, Essel Finance acquired instrance aggregator platform Bimadirect to foray into insure-tech.

== Mergers & Acquisitions ==
Chadda has executed multiple M&A deals since 2013. According to him every acquisitioin is a bet on people. Foodpanda did more than 20 acquisitions in his tenure. Chadda led the acquisitions and integrations of Just Eat India and Tastykhana with Foodpanda India.After Foodpanda, he acquired Ruplee, an in-restaurant digital payments company to venture into digital payments. He pivoted Ruplee into an omni-channel payments system and built the first interoperable QR code before UPI existed. During his tenure at Essel Group, Essel Finance acquired an insure-tech startup bimadirect. At Times Group, Chadda has led 2 acquisitions - Digit & Opigo. He reminisced about reading Digit magazine at a public library as a college student and 25 years later, having the opportunity to lead the business himself. Several new initiatives after its acquisition in 2023 by Times Group like launching Digit Test Labs, AI powered product discovery, the Digit Shop, B2C expansion of SKOAR, its e-sports initiative has led to Digit's turnaround under his tenure. After launching ET Now's digital business news platform in 2023, Chadda expanded its fintech footprint with the acquisition of Opigo.

== Philanthropy ==
Chadda organised a £1 mliion charity bike ride in aid of the British Asian Trust which saw participation by the Prince of Wales. Chadda presented the Prince of Wales with a cycling vest, which was said to be for his grandchildren. Chadda supports a non-profit organisation Mukkamaar founded by Bollywood actress Ishita Sharma that works towards fighting crime against women by teaching free self defence to young girls. He is helping the organisation launch their digital program through a WhatsApp-based chatbot.

== Award and recognitions ==
- Aditya Birla Award for Business Leadership 2007–08, 2008–09
- Professional Entrepreneur of the Year 2014
- Young Food & Grocery Professional of the Year 2014
- Fortune 40 under 40 most influential business leaders list 2015
- Top 25 Most Talented Ecommerce Professionals in India 2015
- Young Entrepreneur of the Year 2016
- Exemplary Achievement in Corporate World 2020
- Top Tech CEOs of the Decade in India
- 10 Most Successful Tech CEOs of The Decade
- IMPACT Digital Power 100
