= Hello Curry =

Food delivery and restaurant company

Hello Curry Pvt. Ltd.
- Industry: Food delivery and restaurant
- Founded: Early 2014
- Founders: Sandeep Penumatsa & Raju Bhupathi
- Headquarters: Hyderabad, India
- Area served: Hyderabad, Bengaluru, Pune, Delhi NCR
- Website: www.hellocurry.com/index.php

Hello Curry Pvt. Ltd. was an Indian food delivery and Quick Service Restaurant (QSR) company headquartered in Hyderabad, India. Founded in early 2014, it was one of the early food technology startups to gain prominence in the Hyderabad market, focusing on delivering Indian curry-based meals in a fast-food format with attractive packaging. By November 2015 they had 32 outlets for its food delivery operations.

== History ==
Hello Curry was founded in early 2014 by Raju Bhupathi and Sandeep Penumatsa. The core idea was to address the lack of reliable and quick delivery options for Indian cuisine by offering standardized, quick-service Indian food, focusing on taste, quality, and innovative packaging. They delivered fast food prepared at partner restaurants. The company quickly gained traction, becoming a popular food-tech startup in Hyderabad.

By November 2015, the company had expanded its operations to 32 outlets. It also expanded its physical presence by opening its first dine-in QSR restaurant, also named "Hello Curry", in Hyderabad in January 2015. Hello Curry also started a new product line called Hello Paratha in September 2015, which purveyed stuffed parathas, often utilizing a "Kitchen in Commercial Kitchen (KICK)" model where they partnered with existing restaurants for food preparation and delivery logistics, while Hello Curry handles expenses for food and packaging.

The company was financially backed, having raised a seed funding round from Sri Capital in March 2014.
