= Lezzoo =

Iraqi on-demand delivery company

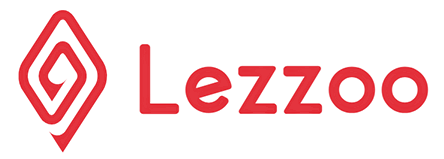
- Type: Private
- Industry: Online food ordering
- Founded: January 2018; 8 years ago Erbil, Iraq
- Founders: Yadgar Merani; Rekar Botany
- Headquarters: Primam St; Erbil, Kurdistan Region, Iraq
- Area served: Iraq
- Key people: Yadgar Merani (CEO); Rekar Botany (CTO)
- Services: Food delivery; Online grocer
- Website: lezzoo.com

Lezzoo is an Iraqi online grocer and on-demand food delivery company, that launched in Erbil in 2018. Initially specialising in food deliveries, it has since extended its services to the delivery of groceries, pharmaceutical products, water and gas; additionally providing health and cleaning services in cities across Kurdistan Region. The super-app is the first and only Y Combinator-backed startup in Iraq.

== History ==
Lezzoo was founded in February 2018 by Fastwares, Yadgar Merani and Rekar Botany, initially under the name Lezzoo Eats. "Eats" was later on removed from the name and kept only as "Lezzoo", derived from the Badini word Lez and Sorani word Zoo, both translating into "Quick", thus translating the brand name as Quickquick.

Inspired by various foreign delivery companies, Lezzoo initially specialized in food ordering and delivery service. To solve the logistical challenges existing in the region, it set off to gradually remake itself into a digital Hypermarket, allowing local restaurants and retailers to make sales through the super-app, while also supporting smaller local businesses.

In December 2018, Lezzoo became the first and only Iraqi startup to graduate (and receive a pre-seed investment) from the Y Combinator accelerator program.

In November 2019, CEO and co-founder Yadgar Merani, shared having at least $700,000 worth of gross merchandise volume (GMV) circulating in cash around the companies delivery and accounting network.

In May 2020 (during the COVID-19 pandemic), the company reported having partnered with the French supermarket chain Carrefour. That same month, Lezzoo reported seeing a 25% order increase in comparison to its January figures when adding healthcare features to the app and delivering essential goods, such as water and gas.

As of June 2020, the company reported it was now processing close to 50,000 orders every month and had launched Lezzoo Pay, a digital wallet to replace cash payments and allow users to buy different types of prepaid cards.

=== Funding ===
In December 2018, Lezzoo was accepted into Silicon Valley's Y combinator accelerator program and received a pre-seed investment of $150,000; becoming the first Iraqi startup to ever take part in the world-renowned accelerator's program.

In July 2020, the start-up company closed the largest seed round in Iraq, raising a seven-figure investment led by New York and Iraq-based investment firm Northern Gulf Partners and California-based venture capital firm Pay It Forward.

== Operation ==
Lezzoo delivers orders and services to its users with over 100,000 products and over 700 stores to choose from.

The app provides complete online menus from restaurants and a large selection of products from grocery stores and pharmacies. Users can also order services such as the delivery of water and gas, at-home medical checks, laundry care, sanitization and cleaning, garden maintenance and express delivery by using the application on the iOS or Android (operating system) platforms.

Meals and products are delivered by couriers using cars and scooters. Water and gas are delivered by heavy-duty vehicles.

=== Geography ===
Lezzoo is currently operating in the Kurdistan Region of Iraq in Erbil, Sulaymaniyah, Duhok, Kirkuk and Zakho.

=== COVID-19 initiative ===
The company faced challenges from March-May 2020 due to the Kurdistan Regional Government (KRG) imposed curfews and reduction of office hours in response to the COVID-19 pandemic, but shortly after became the key solution to the delivery of groceries, water and gas. During this time, Lezzoo actively reassured its consumers it was following COVID-19 guidelines and had equipped drivers with sufficient amounts of masks and sanitizers.

In April 2020, the company introduced at-home COVID-19 follow-up checks to its medical services and began providing disinfection and sterilization services to help minimize the spread of the virus.
