= Hungryhouse =

British food order and delivery service

hungryhouse.com LTD
- Industry: Online food ordering
- Founded: 2006
- Defunct: 2018
- Headquarters: London, England, UK
- Area served: United Kingdom
- Parent: Just Eat; Delivery Hero (former)
- Website: just-eat.co.uk/hungryhouse

Hungryhouse.co.uk was an online takeaway food order and delivery service founded in 2006 and merged with Just Eat in 2018. It allowed users to search for restaurants and browse local takeaway menus before placing an order online and being delivered by the restaurant with a small service charge for using their service.

In January 2013, the company was bought by Berlin-based holding company Delivery Hero. In February 2018, Hungry House became part of Just Eat following a successful merger. Hungry House ceased trading on 22 May 2018 and customers were diverted to Just Eat.

== History ==
Co-founders Shane Lake and Tony Charles founded Hungryhouse in 2003, launching the online platform in 2006. The co-founders appeared on BBC One's investment show Dragons' Den in 2007, with an offer of £100,000 investment coming from James Caan and Duncan Bannatyne.

The investment deal with the Dragons later collapsed, with a £150,000 investment coming from alternative business angels. The initial round of funding was used to expand the business, increasing Hungryhouse's restaurant partners from 150 in 2007 to 2,500 in September 2010.

In February 2013, it was announced that Hungryhouse was to be bought by the Berlin-based food ordering giant Delivery Hero, operating in 16 countries with a total of 60,000 restaurant partners.

In December 2016, Just Eat announced that it was acquiring Hungryhouse from Delivery Hero for £200 million (with the possibility of a further £40 million if the company hits performance targets), subject to regulatory approval. In May 2017, the proposed acquisition was referred to an in-depth phase 2 investigation by the Competition and Markets Authority (CMA). On 12 October 2017, CMA gave a preliminary approval for Just Eat to acquire its smaller rival.

In April 2018, Hungry House announced it would cease trading on 22 May 2018 and merge with Just Eat.
