= Food delivery =

Food courier service

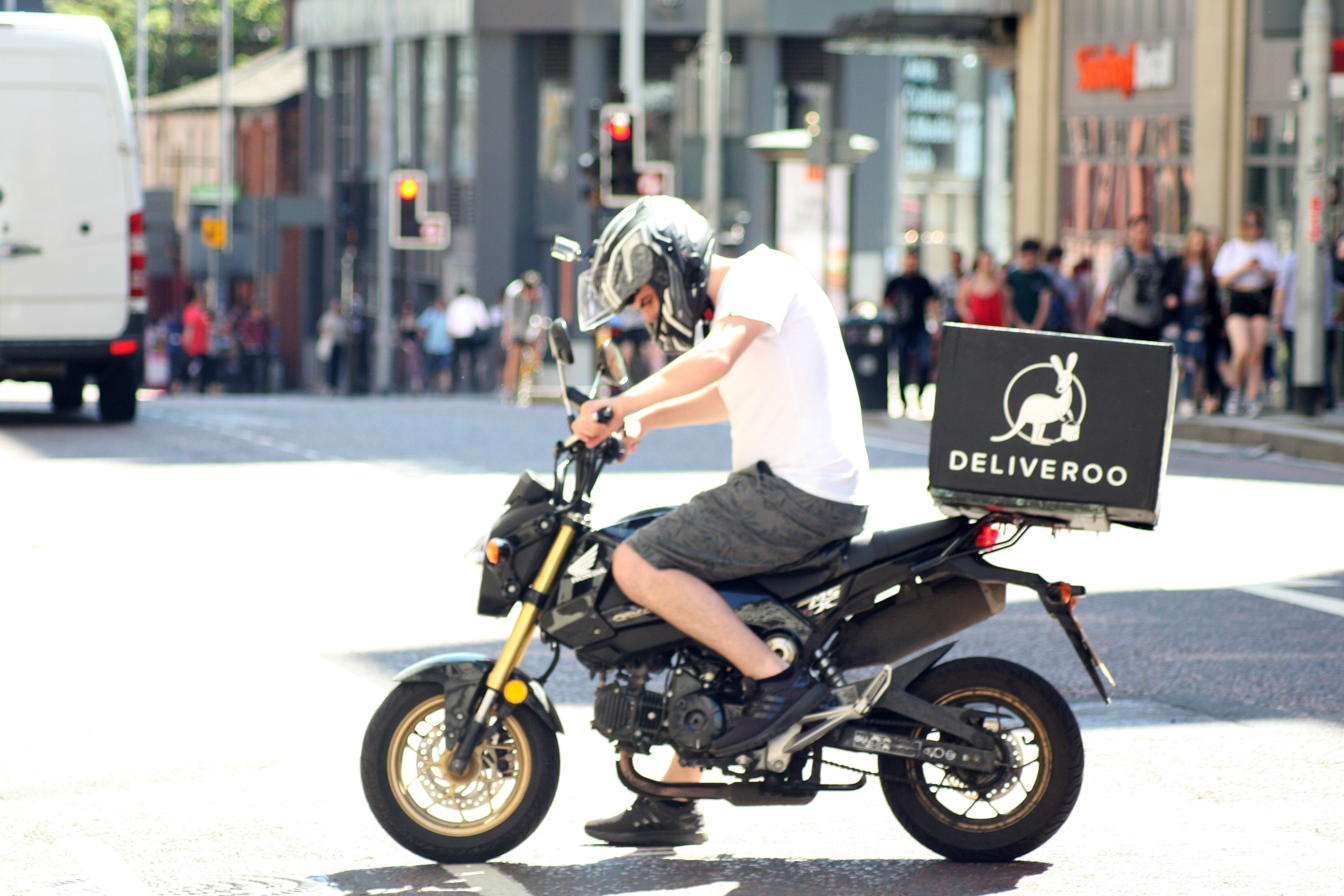
Deliveroo rider in Manchester, UK

Food delivery is a courier service through which a restaurant, store, or independent food-delivery company delivers food to a customer. An order is generally placed through one of three channels: by telephone, via the supplier's website or mobile app, or through a third-party food ordering service. Items delivered may include entrees, sides, drinks, desserts, or grocery items and are usually delivered in boxes or bags. The delivery person typically drives a car, but in larger cities where homes and restaurants are closer together, they may use bikes or e-scooters.

Due to shifting habits in response to lockdowns and restrictions from the COVID-19 pandemic, online food delivery through third-party companies has become a growing industry and caused a "delivery revolution." Nascent technologies, such as autonomous vehicles have also been used to complete deliveries.

Customers can, depending on the delivery company, choose to pay online or in person, with cash or card. A flat rate delivery fee is often charged with what the customer has bought. Sometimes no delivery fees are charged depending upon the situation. Tips are sometimes customary for food delivery service. Contactless delivery may also be an option.

Other aspects of food delivery include catering and wholesale food service deliveries to restaurants, cafeterias, health care facilities, and caterers by foodservice distributors.

== History ==
The first food delivery service was for naengmyeon (cold noodle) in Korea, recorded in 1768. Haejang-guk (hangover soup) was also delivered for the yangban in the 1800s. Advertisement for food delivery and catering also appeared in the newspaper in 1906.

The Muffin Man is a nursery rhyme first recorded in 1820. Victorian households often had fresh food delivered, with the door-to-door vendor of English muffins known as the muffin man.

In 1962, an Edinburgh fish and chip shop started delivering fish suppers, chicken and hamburgers by car within the Edinburgh metropolitan area. The food was delivered in a stainless steel insulated pot to keep it warm.

== Types ==
=== Meal delivery ===
A meal delivery service sends customers fresh or frozen prepared meals delivered to their home or office, perhaps in the form of cooked, individually pre-portioned meals. Meals may come in small tupperware containers and are often labeled with nutritional information. Some providers offer many options for specific diet types like vegetarian and vegan. These services often operate on a subscription business model rather than by individual order as in pizza delivery or with the broader category of online food ordering.

An alternative type of meal delivery service is a meal kit, which distributes ingredients and recipes that customers prepare themselves.

Meal delivery orders are typically on demand, intended to be eaten right away, and include hot, already-prepared food. While some service providers offer subscription services, ordering for delivery usually involves contacting a local restaurant or chain by telephone or online. Online ordering is available in many countries, where some stores offer online menus and ordering. Since 1995, companies such as Waiter.com have their own interfaces where customers order food from nearby restaurants that have partnered with the service. Meal delivery requires special technology and care, since the food items are already cooked and prepared, and can be easily damaged if dropped, tilted, or left out for long periods of time. Hotbags are often used to keep food warm. They are thermal bags, typically made of vinyl, nylon, or Cordura, that passively retain heat.

In Mumbai, dabbawalas deliver hundreds of thousands of lunches (tiffin) to paying subscribers every workday through a system of rail and bicycle links. The lunches are sent in tiffin carriers, and are prepared in the late morning by either a restaurant or family member (typically a wife for a working husband, since many families still follow traditional asymmetrical gender roles). The tiffins are then returned either in the afternoon or the next day by the same system.

In the Philippines, most commonly delivered meals are from fast food chains like Jollibee, McDonald's, Pizza Hut, Shakey's, KFC, etc. Orders are placed through their delivery websites, mobile apps, or by phone. Time of delivery usually takes around 30 to 45 minutes.

In China, consumers mainly place food delivery orders via smartphone apps, with the number of users approaching 500 million people as of 2020. The transaction scale of China's food delivery market is expected to eventually surpass US $129.17 billion, an increase of 14.8% year-on-year.

=== Delivery of ingredients ===
Community-supported agriculture schemes work on a subscription box model, where a box of vegetables, dairy product, fish, or meat is delivered periodically from a local vendor.

Various meal kit delivery subscription services have started in Europe and North America since 2007. These typically have pre-measured ingredients designed for accompanying recipes.

=== Grocery delivery ===
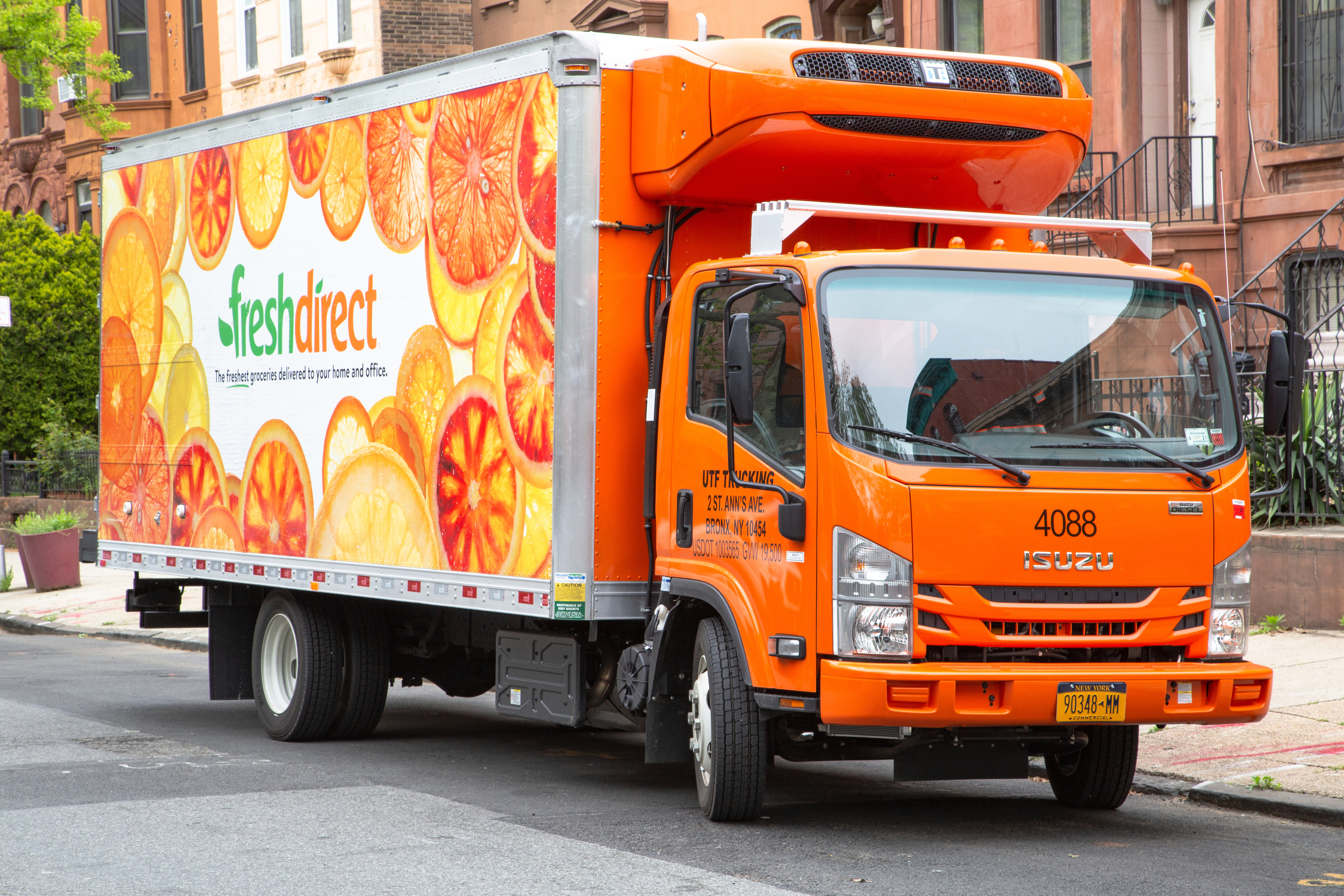
A delivery truck from the online-only grocery delivery service, FreshDirect, which services metro New York City

Grocery delivery companies will deliver groceries, pre-prep or pre-made meals, and more to customers. The companies work with brick and mortar stores or their own line of grocery items. These orders are typically larger and more expensive than normal meal deliveries, and are often not meant to be eaten right away, rather they are to replace items someone has run out of, like flour or milk. They are almost always done online, and typically take at least one day to deliver, though some companies offer same-day delivery. Many delivery services are required to offer delivery within two hours because frozen and fresh foods must be delivered before they spoil.

Grocery delivery differs greatly from meal delivery in the sense that it is usually sent as a parcel through common mailing services like USPS or FedEx, if it is only non-perishables. Since non-perishable items are normally packaged before arriving at grocery stores, they can easily be repackaged and delivered to customers without any special care. Sometimes, dry ice is added to keep perishable items fresh. Fresh and frozen foods complicate delivery which is done, usually by store/provider employees or third party services.

The grocery delivery business emerged, with hundreds of niche delivery companies springing up offering a variety of different services from weekly grocery restock to pre-planned, pre-measured family meals to simplify cooking. Online retailer giants have hopped on board too. Amazon.com, for example, offers AmazonFresh delivery service. Amazon purchased Whole Foods Market in 2017, and by 2018 Amazon had added Whole Foods items to its Prime Now service, for 2-hour delivery in certain markets.

According to Forbes, grocery stores should deliver their own groceries to help prevent third party, part-time, non-store deliverers from becoming the 'face' or brand image of their local grocer. Limitations of having to pick and deliver groceries within a short period of time need to be remedied to allow for more flexibility to enable more deliveries to be more efficiently routed. Frozen and fresh food refrigeration units inside the store and the delivery vehicle, as well as lockable, consumer refrigeration boxes at the consumers home will be a solution that allows the groceries to be delivered at any time, further relieving delivery issues. This scenario will allow more local grocers to deliver with employees vs outside delivery services.

== Associated fees ==
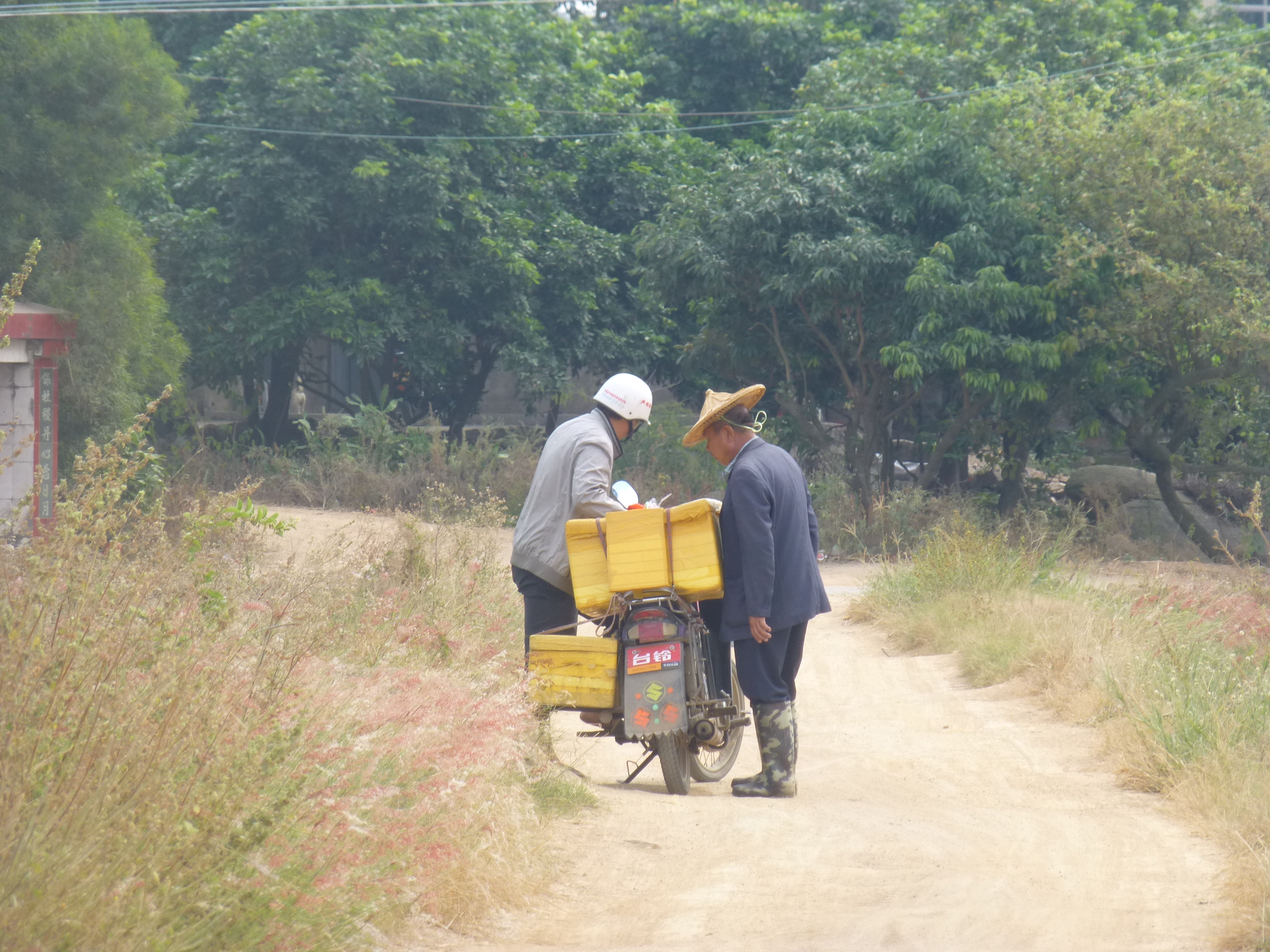
A farmer in his field buys his breakfast from a motorcycle-based traveling vendor. Zhangpu County, Fujian, China.

In addition to paying for the food, customers will often have to pay a delivery fee. The delivery fee will cover the cost of gas or other transportation costs, but usually does not go to the delivery person. For meal delivery, it is common to give the deliverer an optional tip upon paying for the order. In Canada and the United States, tipping for delivery is customary. Opinions on appropriate amounts vary widely. In addition, grocery stores may charge more for the foods that are ordered online for delivery than they charge for the same items off-the-shelf.

In restaurant delivery, if the delivery service is provided by a third party, such as Uber Eats or Deliveroo, the delivery fee, which can be as much as 25 or 30 percent of the value of the order, is paid by the restaurant to the service provider. In addition to the delivery fees, the service companies charge the restaurants a fee to set up the account, further cutting into the restaurants' margins. Due to intense competition between the service providers wishing to sign up restaurants to use their services, restaurants have been able to negotiate lower delivery fees. McDonald's negotiated the delivery fees charged by Uber Eats from nearly 20 percent to "around 15 percent," according to a report in The Wall Street Journal.

In October 2020, Montgomery County, Maryland County Executive Marc Elrich announced that he and the Montgomery County Council (Maryland) were investigating the county's ability to force lower fees charged to restaurants by food delivery apps.

== Service providers ==
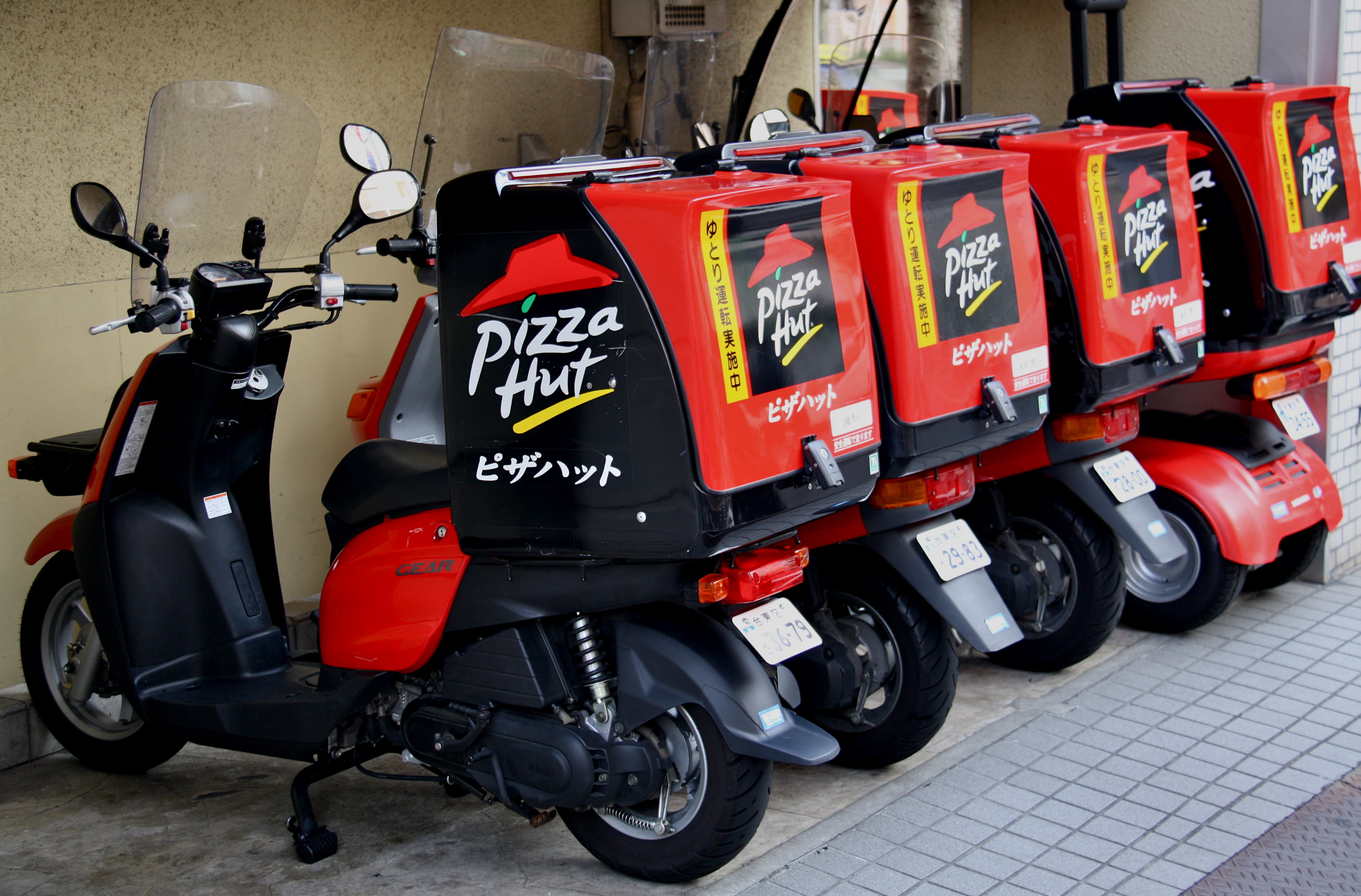
Pizza Hut delivery motorbikes

In the United States, the first restaurant food delivery service in the world began in 1995 with World Wide Waiter and still operates today as Waiter.com. The top three restaurant food delivery services are DoorDash, GrubHub, and Uber Eats, which together account for some 80 percent of the sector's revenue. The remainder is accounted for by smaller services. From 2018 to 2021, global revenues for the online food delivery sector rose from $90 billion to $294 billion.

In Europe, major restaurant delivery services include Deliveroo, Delivery Hero/Food Panda, Just Eat Takeaway, Uber Eats, and Wolt.

In South America, food delivery services include Uber Eats, DoorDash, Grubhub, and Colombia based Rappi. Both Didi and Rappi are funded by SoftBank, the Japanese investment fund that is also a major investor in Uber.

In China, food delivery services include DiDi (the dominant ride-hailing company in China), and Alibaba-acquired Ele.me; and Tencent-backed Meituan. Users can order restaurant food, supermarket products, vegetables and fruit, cakes and flowers for delivery on these platforms. China's food delivery market is expected to cross $21 billion in 2021.

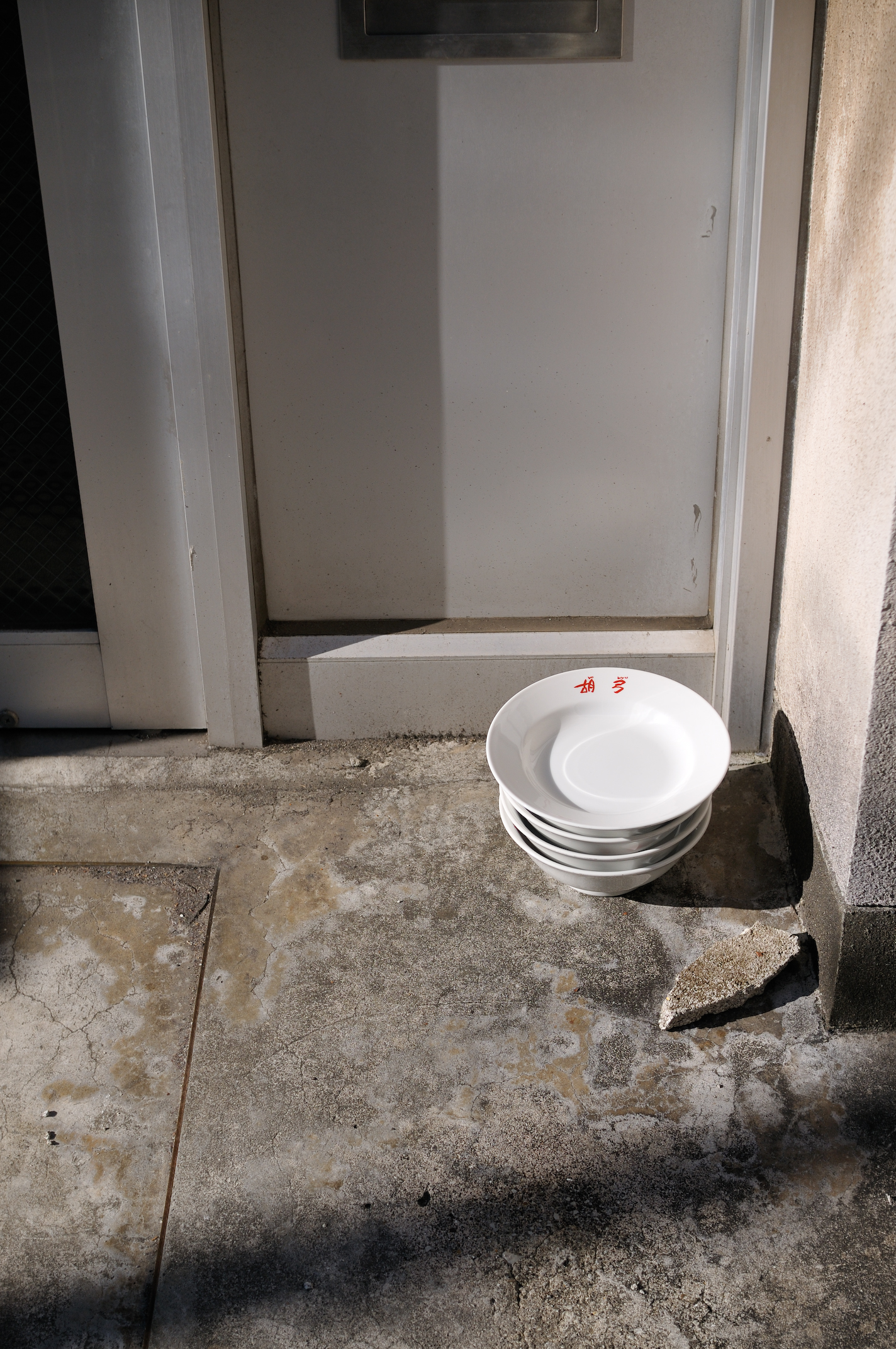
Some Japanese deliveries require recycling of food containers.

In India, the food delivery services include Zomato and Swiggy. Indian online food delivery is expected to become an $8 billion industry by 2020.

In Africa, the food delivery services include Uber Eats currently operating in South Africa and Nairobi; Glovo currently available in Kenya; Jumia Food currently operating in Kenya, Nigeria, Algeria, Ghana, Morocco, Tunisia, Ivory Coast, and Uganda; Mr D Food currently available in South Africa; OrderIn available in South Africa; Ayazona currently available in Nairobi, Kenya; Delivery Yo currently available in Uganda; and Yum Deliveries available in Kenya. Online food delivery in Africa is an emerging market that has seen a soaring growth in 2020 with new competitive market entries. Online food delivery in Africa is slowly starting to take off, with multiple niche local delivery companies springing up offering a variety of different services ranging from food deliveries to groceries and house amenities delivery.

In South Korea, food delivery services include Baedal Minjok, Yogiyo, Uber Eats, and CoupangEats. The South Korean online food delivery industry is expected to reach $10 billion by 2020.

In the Gulf Cooperation Council Region, after Uber Eats decided to close its operations in Middle Eastern markets, major food delivery services include now Careem Now, Deliveroo, Talabat and Noon Food since 2021.

== Technology ==
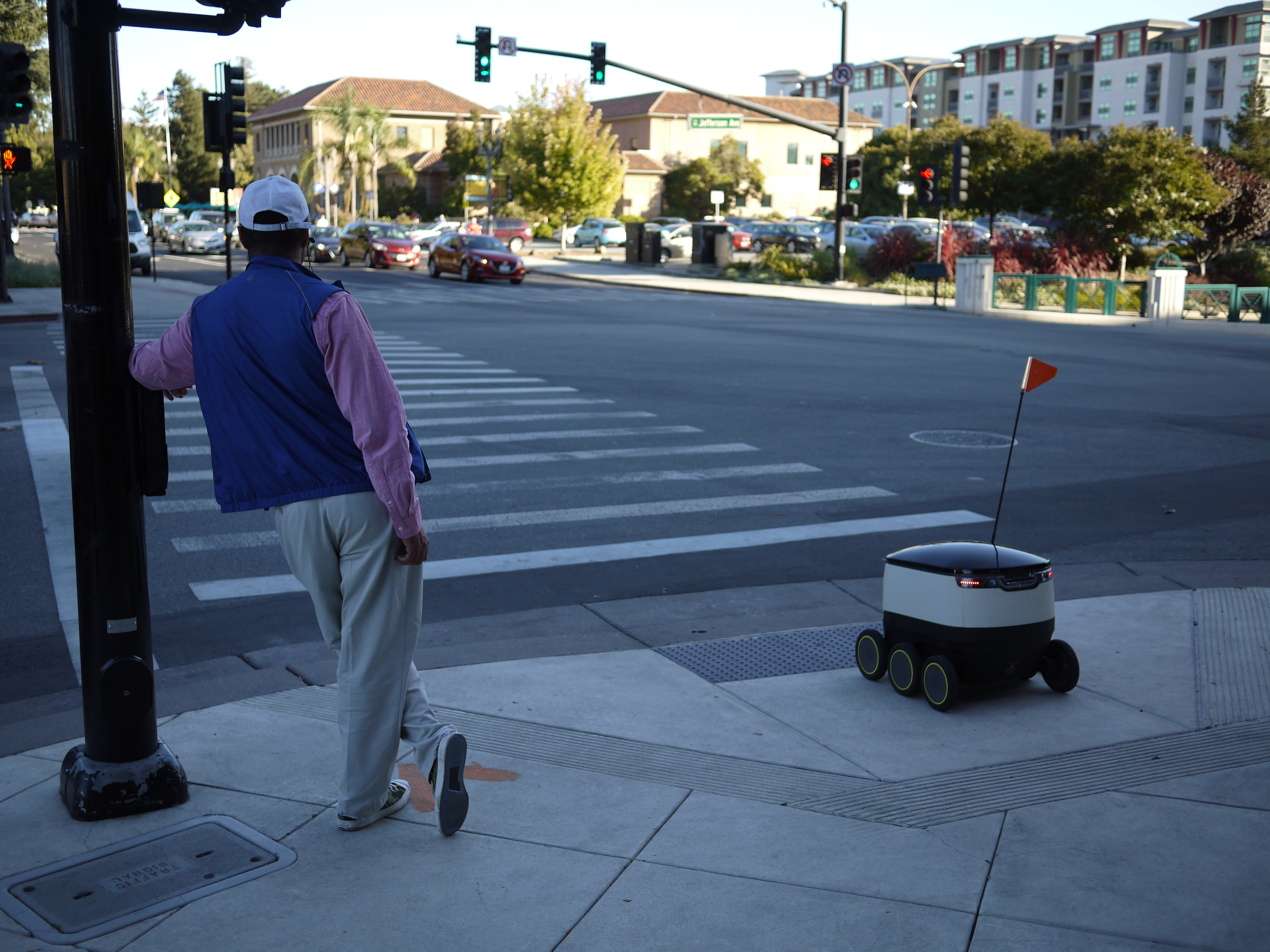
A man and a Starship Technologies delivery robot (right) waiting at a pedestrian crossing in Redwood City, California

As the number of restaurant food delivery systems has increased, so have the logistical challenges of tracking online orders; restaurants using delivery services usually must have each service's tablet or iPad to receive orders, which then must be transferred into the restaurant's own point-of-sales system. To streamline this, software-as-a-service (SaaS) companies have emerged to integrate the online ordering, billing and dispatching of restaurant food orders.

These modern platforms use a fleet management system designed for the challenges of on-demand delivery. The process typically works as follows:

- Order and dispatch: When a customer places an order, the platform's central system automatically dispatches it to the nearest available courier.
- Route optimization: The system's journey planner algorithm calculates the most efficient route for the courier, often bundling multiple orders to improve delivery times.
- Real-time tracking: The platform uses a vehicle tracking system (typically the courier's smartphone) to monitor the courier's location. This allows the customer to track and trace their order in real-time on a map and receive an accurate ETA.
- Data analysis: The platform collects a vast amount of telemetry data on delivery times and courier efficiency to continuously refine the logistics model and evolve from simple tracking to business intelligence. The use of telematics solutions in this sector is recognized for its ability to significantly improve operational performance.

The application created for food delivery have positive influences on the performance and profits of the restaurant and can help to save money and time for both restaurant and customers. Moreover, the COVID-19 pandemic significantly accelerated the growth of the industry, with the number of users approaching one billion people by 2024.

== Criticism ==
In May 2022, workers in two of the biggest GCC food-delivery service providers, Deliveroo and Talabat staged a mass walk out from their workplace in Dubai, United Arab Emirates. They demanded better pay and working conditions through one of the rare industrial acts witnessed by the country. In the first walk out, the Deliveroo workers demanded better pay from their employers, while in the second strike foreign workers pushed Talabat to suspend their plans to cut pay by refusing to make deliveries in the emirate. The Gulf monarchy prohibits the formation of independent trade unions, industrial actions of the sort, and public protests. Reportedly, Talabat drivers in UAE received 3,500 dirhams ($953) per month, without the mention of the number of working hours involved, whereas, Deliveroo drivers earned $2.79 for each delivery made. Post petrol charges, the drivers for Talabat complained that they were left with a total monthly earning of 2,500 dirhams a month, after working seven days a week for about 12 to 14 hours a day. The drivers warned of continuing protests until their demands were met. The UAE authorities remained unavailable for immediate comments. The human rights groups have criticized the emirate and other Gulf nations for committing labor abuse by paying low wages to the migrant workers.

Food delivery has been criticised for enabling unreported employment.

== See also ==
- Cyclologistics
- Food technology
- Meals on Wheels
- Milk delivery
- Online grocer
- Take-out
- Yakult lady
