= Chadda =

Chadda is a Punjabi Khatri surname. Notable people with the surname include:

- Mohit Chadda (fl. 2003–), Indian actor
- Richa Chadda (born 1986), Indian actress
- Rohit Chadda (born 1982), Indian businessman
- Shyam Chadda, (1920–1951) actor
