= Delivery culture in South Korea =

Delivery culture in South Korea started in the Joseon period. Nowadays, because of a fast-paced lifestyle and the role of technology in everyday life, people use delivery services to deliver anything from food, documents, presents, etc. at a cheap price. Although delivery is quite common in other parts of the world, Korean delivery is unique in a way because of the use of scooters and motorcycles to quickly transport food and services.

== History ==
Korean delivery started in the Joseon period (1392–1910). The earliest Korean delivery food on record is naengmyun (냉면) which is cold buckwheat noodles in soup. Hwang Yun-seok (황윤석) mentions in his book, that he ordered naengmyun for lunch with his colleagues on a special day in July 1768. During that time, naengmyun was a famous delicacy in the royal court which also gained popularity among noblemen, which gave birth to the first delivery service. Throughout the Joseon era, delivery service became more widespread among kings and royalty.

In the 1930s, delivery food expanded to various soups and noodles and delivery became a common thing. It was all thanks to Chinese migration to Incheon in the 1900s. Through this expansion, jjajangmyeon noodles, which uses black bean paste sauce, became popular during the 1950's. Thus, delivery services continued to expand during a period of rapid economic growth into the 1970s. This enabled Chinese restaurants to open on every street corner. However, it was not until the 1990s when fried chicken and pizza places conquered the delivery service market. This allowed for the rapid growth of the food delivery market in Korea.

== From phone calls to mobile applications ==
Before smartphones and the internet took over, the older generation used landlines to order delivery. It was common for restaurants to distribute their menu to every household so they can have access to their food options. As technology improved rapidly, delivery services became more convenient as well. Nowadays, 70% of people use mobile delivery to order, thus creating a dominance in the market. Among these apps Yogiyo (요기요), Coupang eats (쿠팡) and Baedal Minjok are the most common.
