= Taobao Shangou =

Online food delivery service

- Type: Subsidiary
- Industry: Online food delivery
- Founded: 2008; 18 years ago
- Founders: Mark Zhang; Jack Kang
- Headquarters: Shanghai, China
- Area served: 2000+ cities in China
- Services: Food delivery, groceries, medicine delivery
- Parent: Alibaba Group
- Website: ele.me

Taobao Shangou (Chinese: 淘宝闪购; lit. 'Taobao Flash Shopping') is the online food delivery and local life service platform of Alibaba Group. Founded in 2008 and known until 2025 as Ele.me (Chinese: 饿了么; lit. 'Are you hungry?'), it was the second largest online food delivery service platform in China as of 2023.

== History ==
Taobao Shangou is an online-to-offline (O2O) catering and food delivery platform in China. It was founded as Ele.me by Mark Zhang and Jack Kang in Minhang Campus of Shanghai Jiao Tong University in 2008 and now is developed and operated by Lazhasi Network Technology (Shanghai) Co., LTD. By the end of December in 2016, Ele.me had covered more than 2000 cities in China, with more than 1.3 million joining shops, 15 thousand staff and more than nine million daily orders. Also, over three million riders had registered under Fengniao Delivery (the sub-service of Ele.me).

On 27 January 2015, Ele.me finished its Series E financing with $350 million invested by CITIC PE, Tencent Holdings, JD.com (Joybuy), HongShan (Sequoia Capital) and Dianping.com. On 28 August 2015, Ele.me announced the completion of its Series F financing with $630 million. The investment was led by CITIC PE and Hualian Group, followed by new investors like China Media Capital (CMC), Gopher Asset as well as the original investors including Tencent Holdings, JD.com (Joybuy) and Hongshan Capital (Sequoia Capital).

On 24 November 2015, Ele.me obtained a strategic investment from Didi Chuxing. On 17 December 2015, Alibaba Group invested $1.25 billion to Ele.me.

On 1 March 2017, Ele.me announced that they would launch an app entitled "Food Security Service". Restaurants that are suspected of violating the law will be synced to the supervision department, and this function now covers all the restaurants in Shanghai. On 8 March 2017, Ele.me announced that 5,257 restaurants were found to violate the rules and were removed within one week. Additionally, 258 restaurants were removed in Sichuan province.

By 2019, Ele.me had become the largest food delivery service in China with 53.4% market share. At the same time, the company increasingly attracted foreign retailers such as notably German supermarket chain Aldi Süd, expanding beyond pure food delivery to FMCG and grocery delivery as part of Alibaba Group's "New Retail" push.

In December 2025, Ele.me was rebranded to Taobao Shangou. The rebranding in December 2025 resulted in folding the food delivery service more tightly into Alibaba's broader instant-retail and e-commerce ecosystem. The decision was reflected in Alibaba's effort to unify consumer-facing services under the Taobao brand and strengthen delivery, shopping, and local commerce as an integrated unit instead of a separate food delivery service. It was also an effort to unify retail under the Taobao brand and the company's effort to enter the fast-growing Chinese instant-commerce market, where delivery time was something customers paid attention to. The rebranding also emphasized a stronger platform and a more cohesive customer buying experience. Taobao Shangou should not be confused with Taobao which is Alibaba's C2C small business e-commerce marketplace. Taobao and Tmall Group together form a majority of Alibaba's core domestic commerce engine. It accounts for a majority of Alibaba's revenue and includes related businesses like Tmall Supermarket, Tmall Global, Xianyu (a second-hand C2C marketplace) and wholesale platforms like 1688.com. In 2023, Alibaba reorganized into six major business groups, each with its own CEO and board, with TTG as the domestic e-commerce pillar, reflecting the strategic centrality of Taobao and Tmall within the wider group. Taobao's domestic consumer focus also included Alibaba.com's global wholesale role, the 2023 1+6+N restructuring also spun out units such as Cainiao which is the logistic arm, cloud intelligence, and local services like Ele.me, Amap into separately governed companies that had the capability to raise outside capital and pursue independent IPOs.Taobao is more geared towards small-scale purchasing within China while Alibaba.com is more primarily a B2B wholesale platform that connects suppliers with bulk buyers around the world.

In 2026, hired food delivery staff specifically for indoor last mile deliveries. The workers are often residents of the apartment complex or office buildings they work in. The last-mile delivery staff worked in dense high-rise districts such as Shenzhen, and local pilots collect orders from external riders in lobbies and complete deliveries inside office towers and residential blocks which addressed access to the building, bottlenecks and time pressure. In 2025 Alibaba also introduced visible branding changes by launching orange F1-inspired uniforms with couriers for the Taobao Shangou platform which has weather resistant materials, insulated boxes, and first-aid pouches. Courier staff were also given healthcare insurance and pension subsidies.

=== Union ===
On 20 April 2017, under the support and guidance of Beijing Food and Drug Administration, major online meal ordering platforms including Ele.me, Meituan Dianping, Baidu Takeaway and Daojia established an online meal ordering platform self-discipline union voluntarily.

The CEOs of the four platforms made a statement and signed the "Self-discipline Convention on Online Takeaway Ordering Platform's Union" together. This convention promised solemnly to the society from 14 aspects including the proprietors' pre-join promise, platform admission, and the improvement of the records management and information publicity of the proprietors. Its specific contents includes: establishing food security institutes and voluntarily publish information to the society on the homepages of the platforms; tightening the regulation of platform admission; submitting the management data and information to the Food and Drug Administration regularly and actively; taking linked supervision and punitive measures among the platforms, and simultaneously removing the restaurants that violate the rules from all the platforms; jointly strengthening the safety training of the riders; paying attention to improve the online advertising and the training of the proprietors; advertising and promoting the "Sunshine Food" project, etc. In 2019, Beijing regulators found that many food outlets on different platforms including Alibaba-owned Ele.me were not licensed and used fake licenses.Ele.me said that it would start to implement requirements that would result in the removal of restaurants that used fake documentation and remove unqualified suppliers.

=== Acquisition by Alibaba Group ===
On 28 February 2018, it was announced that Alibaba Group was in talks to acquire Taobao Shangou (then Ele.me). On April 2, 2018, Alibaba acquired Ele.me for US$9.5 billion. Ele.me was one of China's biggest food-delivery platforms at the time. The purchase was focused on strengthening local delivery networks. Later on Alibaba purchased the remaining shares that they did not already own, resulting in the value of Ele.me in a US$9.5 billion deal. The acquisition was in line with Alibaba's new retail strategy by linking online commerce with offline services and quicker logistics. The purchase was also aimed and focused on increasing competition with Meituan which is known as a food delivery service but also provides hotel booking, travel and movie tickets including other on-demand services.

=== Litigation ===
In May 2021, a delivery driver named Liu died of a stroke while delivering food for Ele.me. Liu had an outsourcing cooperation agreement with a third party agency and had no direct employment relationship with Ele.me. His family sued both the outsourcing firm and Ele.me, arguing that Ele.me should also be responsible in the death for its failure to exercise due care. In November 2022, the Chaoyang District Court ruled in favor of Liu's family, stating that the platform itself was partly liable because it had the capacity to monitor delivery updates but failed to give timely updates to the outsourcing agency, resulting in delayed medical response to Liu. The Chaoyang District Court launched a media campaign to promote the decision.
