= Foodpanda =

Asian mobile food delivery marketplace

- Company type: Subsidiary
- Website type: Online food ordering
- Founded: 26 March 2012; 14 years ago, Singapore
- Area served: Bangladesh; Cambodia; Hong Kong; Laos; Malaysia; Myanmar; Pakistan; Philippines; Singapore; Taiwan
- CEO: John Fang
- Key people: Ralf Wenzel (Global); Benjamin Bauer (Global); Kiren Tanna, Christian Mischler, Nadine Grau Paulin (APAC)
- Industry: Online food and grocery delivery
- Parent: Delivery Hero
- Website: foodpanda.com

Foodpanda (stylized as foodpanda) is a Singaporean online food and grocery delivery platform owned by Berlin-based Delivery Hero. Foodpanda operates as the lead brand for Delivery Hero in Asia, with its headquarters in Singapore. In 2021, it said it was the largest food and grocery delivery platform in Asia outside of China, operating in 11 countries.

== History ==
In 2012, Swiss Lukas Nagel and Rico Wyder established Foodpanda in Singapore, before expanding to Malaysia, Indonesia, the Philippines, Taiwan and Thailand.

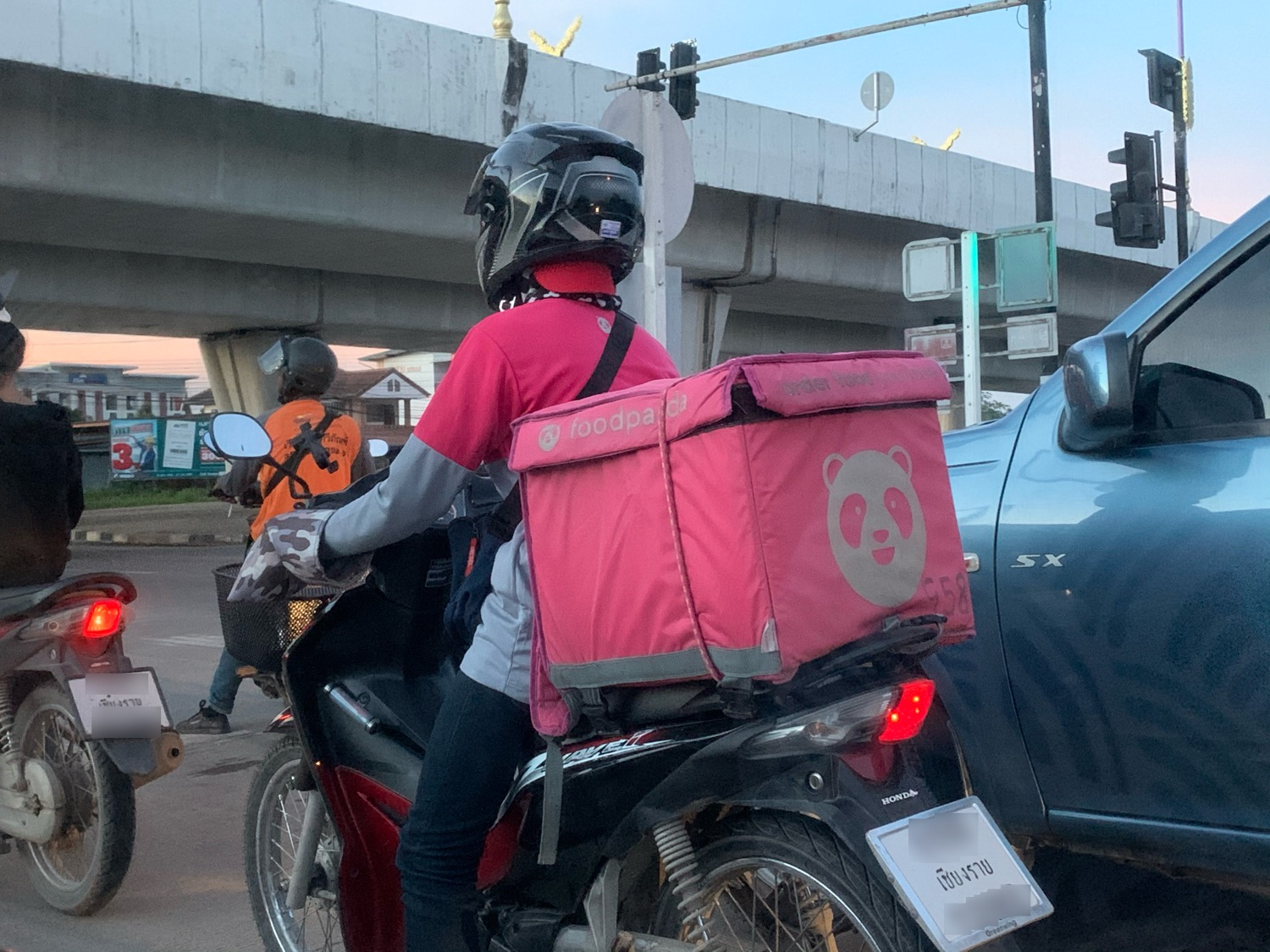
A Foodpanda delivery rider in Chiang Rai Province, Thailand

A year later in 2013, Foodpanda was launched in Bangladesh and Romania. With more than 20,000 employees operating in their company, Foodpanda became the largest food delivery service in Bangladesh.

In 2014, the service expanded into the Balkans, Brunei, as well as the Philippines. In February 2014, Foodpanda acquired Eat Oye, a rival company in Pakistan. Global expansion of the Foodpanda business was led by Ralf Wenzel, Felix Plog and Ben Bauer.

In 2015, co-founder Rohit Chadda stepped down from the company. By 2016, none of the original managing directors or co-founders remained with the company. Its operations in Indonesia also shut down due to competition from flourishing app-based taxi-motorbike services, while the company sold its Delivery Club business in Russia to Mail.Ru for $100 million in November 2016.

Foodpanda's largest investor Rocket Internet sold the company to Delivery Hero in December 2016. On 1 November 2017, Foodpanda re-branded and changed its brand colour from orange to pink with an updated logo across all served countries, following its acquisition by Delivery Hero.

In April 2018, the company left the Brunei market.

By 2019, Foodpanda had gone through three rounds of management changes.

From 2019 to 2020, Foodpanda began operating in other markets in Southeast Asia, launching in Thailand, Myanmar, Cambodia, and Laos. Foodpanda was also launched in Japan in September 2020.

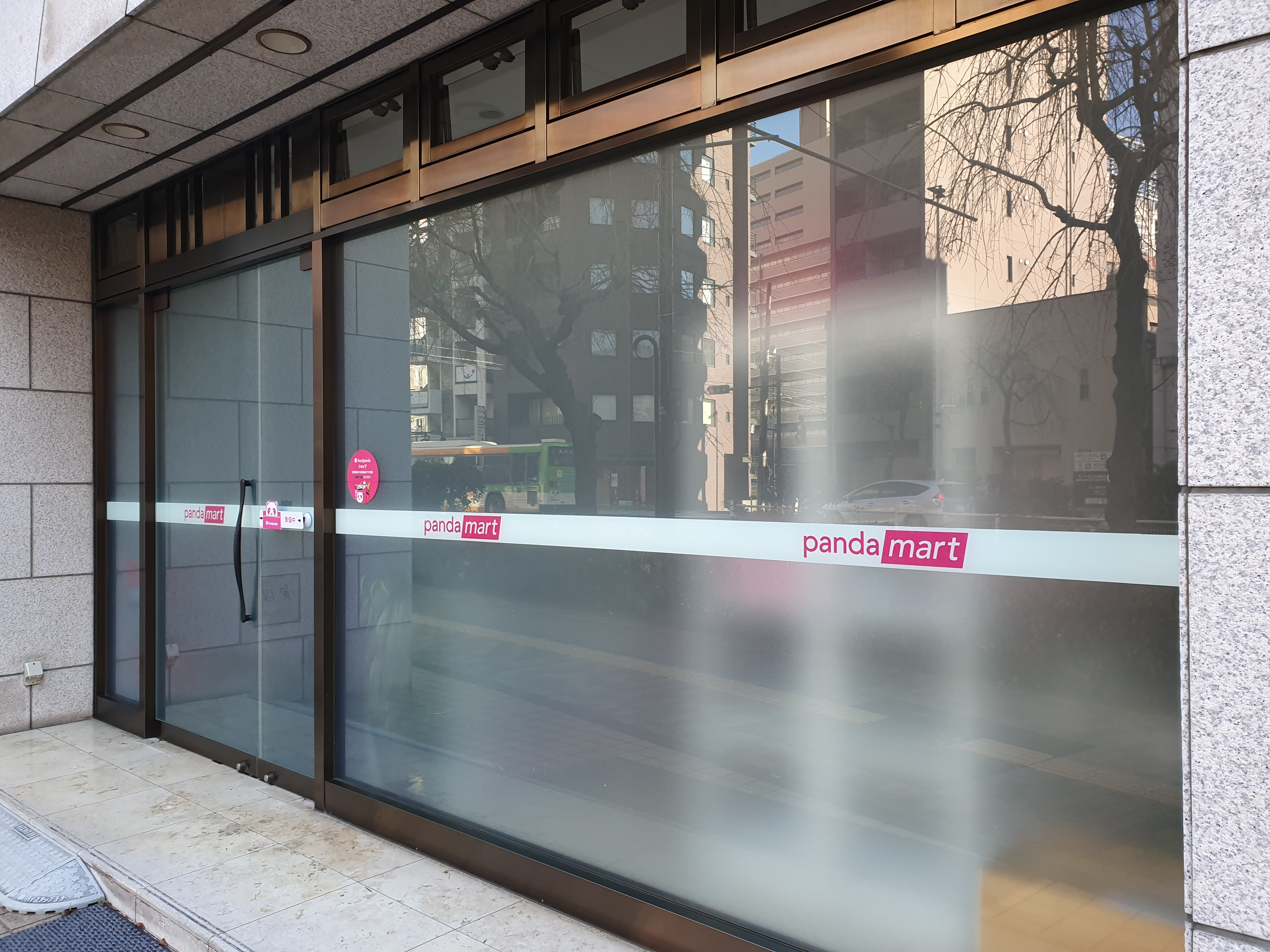
Pandamart in Tokyo, Japan

In May 2021, Foodpanda's brand was acquired by Glovo in Bulgaria and Romania. In September 2021, Delivery Hero unified its subsidiary brand NetPincér with Foodpanda in Hungary, with NetPincér rebranding as Foodpanda. In December 2021, Foodpanda stopped its food delivery services in all cities of Germany, leaving only an R&D hub in Berlin.

Since 2021, Foodpanda has partnered with home chefs through an initiative called Home Chefs. The initiative began in Pakistan after the company noticed that there are a lot of female home chefs looking for side income, but it has since scaled to Bangladesh and Malaysia. The initiative is also seen as a source of income for chefs who do not have the capital to set up shop, but have the ability to cook and provide food from their own kitchens. The initiative currently supports 8,000 to 9,000 home chefs, and Foodpanda plans to grow the initiative to support up to 100,000 home chefs.

In early 2022, Foodpanda announced its new mascot called Pau-Pau, an anthropomorphic panda that cares about empowerment and environment. The new mascot will be rolled out across all of Asia. In August 2022, Foodpanda collaborated with digital investment platform Syfe.

In May 2024 the Foodpanda take-out brand in Taiwan was subject to a $950 million buyout by Uber. However, the deal with Uber was blocked by Taiwanese regulators on antitrust concerns in December 2024.

In 2026, five officials of Foodpanda Bangladesh was arrested related to a fraud case with investigations ongoing.

=== Foodpanda India ===
In early 2015, the company made an all-stock purchase of TastyKhana.in, and the portal Just Eat India. Towards the end of 2015, the company laid off around 300 employees in India. During that time, there was allegedly malpractice at Foodpanda India, including non-payments to restaurants and fake listings. The company was based in Gurgaon at the time and was operating in approximately 200 cities. By 2016, Rocket India was seeking a buyer for the company, proposing relatively low prices such as $10 to $15 million.

Foodpanda's business in India was acquired by Ola through an all-share deal on 11 December 2017, at a valuation of $40 to $50 million. Ola said it would invest around $200 million in additional funds into Foodpanda. The company began offering discounts to increase usage, and at its peak, in August 2018, it had around 200,000 daily orders. That dropped to around 5,000 daily orders by mid-2019. Ola suspended Foodpanda India's food delivery business in the middle of 2019 and fired most of its food delivery executives. The Foodpanda brand was said to continue with in-house brands or cloud kitchens. The cloud kitchen concept was adopted by the company after it acquired the company Holachef in October 2018. In 2019, however, it only had three private label brands under its cloud kitchen business, including FLRT and Great Khichdi Experiment.

== Operations ==
Foodpanda is operating in 11 markets in Asia, including:

- East Asia
  - Hong Kong
  - Taiwan
- Southeast Asia
  - Cambodia
  - Laos
  - Malaysia
  - Myanmar
  - Philippines
  - Singapore
- South Asia
  - Bangladesh
  - Pakistan

=== Former operations ===
- Azerbaijan (2014–2015)
- Brunei (2014–2018)
- Bulgaria (2014–2021; rebranded as Glovo)
- Croatia (2014; merged into Pauza)
- Czech Republic (2013–2014)
- Georgia (2014–2017)
- Germany (2021)
- Hungary (2021–2023; rebranded as Foodora)
- India (2015–2019)
- Japan (2021–2022)
- Kazakhstan (2013–2017)
- Romania (2013–2022; merged into Glovo)
- Serbia (2014; merged into Donesi)
- Slovakia (2013–2014; 2021–2023; rebranded as Foodora)
- Thailand (2012–2025)
- Ukraine (2013–2015)

== Platform ==
Foodpanda processes and sends orders to partnering restaurants, and commissions riders to deliver the food to the customers. The service is available via its websites and mobile applications.

Foodpanda connects customers with restaurants that offer food delivery in their vicinity. Customers can browse the menus of available restaurants, send in food orders, and make payment after providing an address to deliver to. An SMS is sent to confirm the customers' orders and indicate the estimated delivery time.

Foodpanda also has a review section on restaurant pages, where customers can comment on sales process, delivery, taste, and overall impression of the partnering restaurants.

== Investments ==
Foodpanda raised $20 million in initial funding from Investment AB Kinnevik, Phenomen Ventures and Rocket Internet in April 2013. In September 2013, iMENA Holdings invested $8 million. In February 2014, there was another funding round of $20 million from a group of investors, including Phenomen Ventures.

On 11 August 2014, the company announced that it has collected another $60 million in financing from a group of investors.

In March 2015, the company announced it has raised over $110 million from Rocket Internet, as well as other investors. Less than two months later, a group of investors, including Goldman Sachs Alternatives, invested over $100 million in Foodpanda.

In December 2016, Delivery Hero acquired Foodpanda in full for an undisclosed price.

== Controversies ==
=== Political controversies ===
In August 2020, Thai pro-democracy protesters launched a boycott against Foodpanda after it was identified as an advertiser on Nation TV, a pro-establishment mouthpiece. The boycott forced the company to suspend all of its advertisements on the channel amid concerns for its reputation.

In July 2021, the company suffered another widespread boycott in Thailand after it tweeted that it would dismiss one of its drivers who was seen at the place where a royal portrait was set on fire during a pro-democracy protest on 18 July, saying his act breached its policy against "terrorism". It was reported that around two million users in Thailand deleted their accounts on the Foodpanda application overnight. Many restaurants also joined the boycott, announcing their withdrawal from their partnerships with Foodpanda. The company later apologised, stating that it supports free speech and would not dismiss the driver.

=== Poor business practices allegations ===
In October 2021, the company faced backlash in Malaysia after several vendors alleged that it was charging excessively high commission rates along with hidden fees. The controversy escalated when more than 70 screenshots of Facebook posts and vendor invoices surfaced, showing claims that these hidden fees left some sellers with zero profit. As a result, several vendors chose to terminate their accounts with the service.

In July 2021, the company experienced protests in the Philippines over alleged unfair wage policies for its riders. Shortly before the protests started, at least 30 of its riders were reportedly suspended for 10 years. The company apologised for the suspensions, claiming that the occurrence was caused by technical glitches in the riders' software.

=== Workplace abuse allegations ===
In November 2021, some Foodpanda workers in Hong Kong went on strike, denouncing exaggerated monthly income promises and other problems.
