= Foodora =

German online food delivery company

foodora

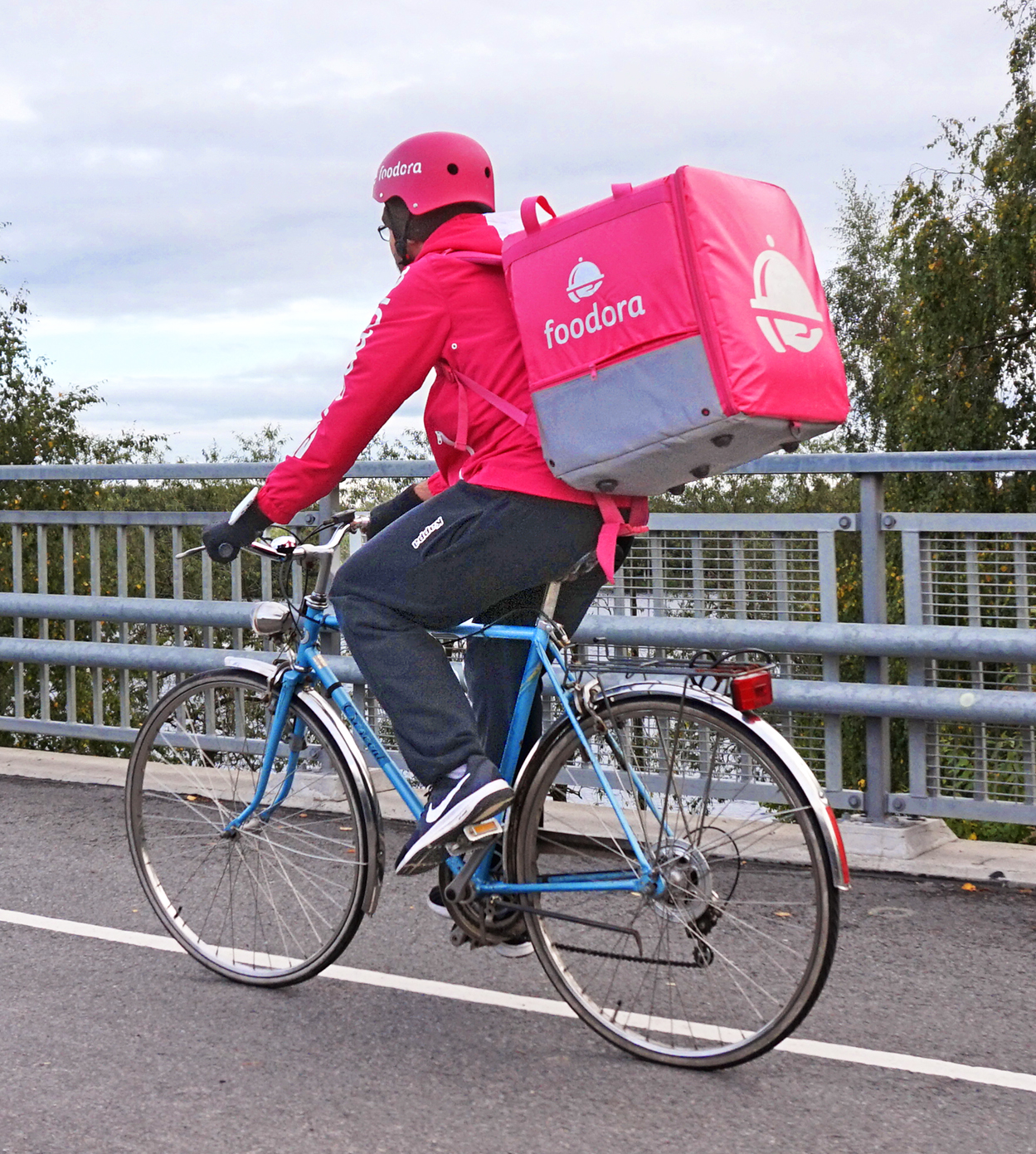
- Foodora rider in Tampere, Finland, September 2017
- Type: Private
- Industry: Online food ordering
- Founded: 2014; 12 years ago in Munich, Germany
- Founders: Konstantin Mehl, Emanuel Pallua, Manuel Thurner, Stefan Rothlehner
- Headquarters: Berlin, Germany
- Areas served: Sweden; Norway; Hungary; Austria; Czech Republic
- Key people: Pedram Assadi; Jana Senner; Camille Hadjéri; Herbert Haas; Prashant Søegaard; Hans Skruvfors; Niklas Östberg
- Parent: Delivery Hero
- Website: foodora.com

Foodora is an online food delivery brand owned by Delivery Hero. It was founded in Munich, Germany, and operates in Austria, Czech Republic, Hungary, Norway and Sweden.

== History ==
Foodora's former logo (before 2023)

Foodora was founded under the name Volo GmbH in Munich in February 2014. It relocated to Berlin when Rocket Internet acquired the majority of the company in April 2015. In June 2015, it also acquired food delivery services Hurrier (in Canada), Suppertime (in Australia), and Heimschmecker (in Austria), which all operate under the Foodora brand. In September 2015, Delivery Hero acquired Foodora from Rocket Internet. Foodora was then merged with Delivery Hero's upscale food delivery brand, Urban Taste, under the name Foodora.

In December 2018, the Dutch group Takeaway purchased the German delivery operations of Delivery Hero, including Foodora Germany. On April 1, 2019, the transaction was completed, with Foodora GmbH officially belonging to Lieferando, a part of Takeaway.

== Operations ==
Line of four Foodora delivery robots at Södermalm, Stockholm, Sweden, June 2025

Using Foodora's website or mobile app, customers can browse restaurants near them, place their orders, and pay. The order is then prepared by the restaurant, picked up by one of Foodora's couriers (foodsters), and delivered to the customer “in about 30 minutes". In some cases, depending on region, delivery robots also in service. Foodora provides both B2C and B2B food delivery services.

== Geographical presence ==
Foodora currently operates in Austria, Czech Republic, Hungary, Norway, Sweden.

It formerly operated in Denmark (late 2022–14 June 2024), Germany (2014–2019), Finland (2015–2026), France (2015–2018), Italy (2015–2018) the Netherlands (2015–2018) and Slovakia (2021–4 April 2024). Outside Europe it maintained services in Australia (2015–2018) and Canada (2015–2020).

=== Australia ===
Foodora had expanded over the Australian market in Sydney, Melbourne and Brisbane. In September 2015, it acquired a local delivery company named Suppertime, later re-branding it to Foodora in May. On 1 August 2018, Foodora announced that it was closing operations in Australia on 20 August 2018, citing a focus on markets with higher potentials for growth. Unions called out Foodora's decision to leave the country during various disputes with workers, including over alleged unfair dismissal and millions of dollars of back pay, which had led to the Fair Work ombudsman taking the company to federal court a few months earlier. In November 2018, Foodora admitted that workers owed more than $5 million in unpaid wages were "more likely than not" employees.

=== Canada ===
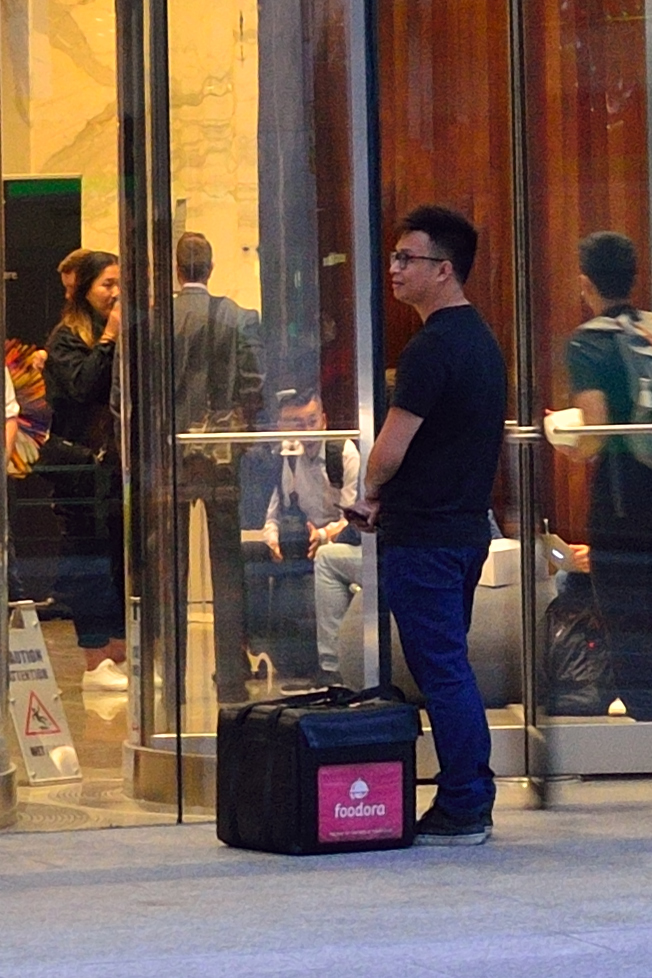
Foodora delivery man outside of a commercial office, October 2017

In July 2015, Foodora entered the Canadian market by acquiring Toronto-based delivery company Hurrier. They expanded to Montreal in October 2015 and later re-branded both cities to Foodora in January 2016. An expansion to Vancouver occurred in 2016. They expanded to Ottawa in early 2019.

In February 2020, deliverers in Toronto and Mississauga were granted the right to unionize with the Canadian Union of Postal Workers. Two months later, Foodora filed for bankruptcy in Canada and exited the market. Observers noted that Foodora's bankruptcy filing shortly after a successful unionization effort resembled the company's behavior in Australia. CUPW noted that Delivery Hero's profitability had doubled between 2019 and 2020, and later reached a settlement for former workers, with Foodora paying the union $3.46 million.

=== Sweden ===
Foodora is the largest restaurant delivery service in Sweden, where one third of its employees have a collective agreement, negotiated with the Transport Workers' Union. In March 2021, the company introduced the first Foodora's delivery robot into its fleet in Stockholm. The droid, called Doora, will work in quick commerce, delivering household goods, groceries, pharmaceuticals, and electronics.

In 2023, in response to an investigative report by media outlet Breakit citing employees' concerns over work conditions in the company, Foodora announced it would hire an external investigator to examine its compliance and governance structure.

== Controversies ==
Foodora has been accused of "sham contracts" with its workers. In October 2016, its workers in Turin responded to the proposed change from hourly work to piece work with an organised protest against the general reduction in the quality of work. In 2017, its workers protested working conditions in Berlin.

Foodora workers in Australia have spoken out about the company. Workers have protested against the continuously falling rate of pay and policies that encourage dangerous behavior on the road. Also of concern is workers' status as independent contractors despite their working conditions resembling that of employees. Foodora has responded punitively against workers who have spoken out, leading at least two workers to pursue legal action against the company. On 16 November 2018, Foodora lost its unfair dismissal case, as the court ruled that its drivers were classed as employees rather than contractors, and was ordered to pay a former delivery driver almost $16,000 in compensation. According to a survey carried out at the end of 2020 on behalf of Foodora, 8 out of 10 of the company's employees are satisfied with their work. Foodora has been positively rated by Timbro for having low thresholds to enter the labor market.
