= Baedal Minjok =

South Korean food delivery company

- Native name: 배달의 민족
- Industry: Food delivery
- Founded: 2010
- Founder: Kim Bong-jin (businessman)
- Headquarters: Seoul
- Area served: South Korea
- Key people: Kim Beom-Joon (CEO)
- Products: Baedal Minjok Application
- Owners: Woowa DH Asia Pte. Ltd. (89.55%); Takeaway.com Group B.V. (0.23%); Kim Bong-jin (8.36%)
- Website: baemin.com

Baedal Minjok (Korean: 배달의 민족; RR: Baedalui Minjok; lit. 'Nation of Delivery') is a South Korean food delivery company. Baedal Minjok is owned by Woowa Brothers Corp, a subsidiary of Delivery Hero.

Baedal Minjok is the largest food delivery application in South Korea.

== History ==
Baedal Minjok was created in 2010 by founder Kim Bong-jin. Kim sought to create a service for restaurants to advertise on, and began by scanning restaurant flyers which he found on the ground of Gangnam, Seoul. Kim created the Baedal Minjok platform to earn a commission on orders which were placed through the application. In the early days of operation, the company founders met and worked in a Cafe in Seoul, rather than in an office.

The company received US$35.6 million of investment from Goldman Sachs in 2014, and a further investment of US$320 million of investment in 2018. The company was valued at KRW 1 trillion in 2015, and by 2018 it was valued at KRW 5 trillion.

In June 2019, Baedal Minjok began operations in Vietnam starting from Ho Chi Minh City. In January 2021 they pulled out of the Vietnam market.

In December 2019, the company entered acquisition discussions with German delivery company Delivery Hero, as the German firm sought to acquire an 87% stake in the company. Delivery Hero already owned South Korean competitors Yogiyo and Baedaltong. The deal faced pushback from the Korea Fair Trade Commission on anti-trust grounds. The proposed acquisition would give Delivery Hero a 97% market share of the South Korean delivery market. In December 2020, the Korea Fair Trade Commission announced that the US$4 billion was approved on the condition that Delivery Hero sell its Korean subsidiary, Yogiyo.

On April 12, 2021, Baedal Minjok announced the launch of a new product, 'Baemin 1 (one)' for gig workers.

== Controversy ==
In early 2020, Baedal Minjok was criticized for a new pricing strategy which charged restaurants using its platform a 5.8% fixed-rate fee. This practice was criticized for elevating large chain restaurants while putting smaller restaurants at a disadvantage. Lee Jae-Myung, the governor of Gyeonggi Province (Korea's largest province) called the price strategy 'tyranny'. Baedal Minjok reversed this new pricing scheme in May of that year.

Baedal Minjok faced controversy over the introduction of their 'flash delivery' service in March 2021. Baedal Minjok freelance delivery drivers claimed that their wages were negatively impacted by the new service.

Companies such as Baedal Minjok, Delivery Container, Yogiyo, Delivery 365, Menu Box, and Delivery O were caught by Korea Fair Trade Commission while hiding complaints and manipulating reviews of compliments. In Baedal Mijok application, 14,057 complaints were reviewed privately, with a fine of 17.5 million won being imposed along with corrective action.

== Manhwakyung ==
In 2019, Woowa Brothers Corp created a webtoon site Manhwakyung. Woowa Brothers, an operator of the nation's top online food delivery platform Baedal Minjok, is looking for more business opportunities in online comics as the company is actively recruiting staff for its webtoon service, Manhwakyung. The company saw sales skyrocket as more and more people stayed at home after the outbreak of the COVID-19 pandemic.
