= Times Drive =

- Genre: Motoring
- Presented by: Joel Pereira; Kailash Menon; Juhi Pande
- Country of origin: India
- Original language: English
- No. of series: 3
- No. of episodes: 95

Production
- Producer: Joel Pereira Anuj Rai Abhishek Singh Jadav
- Running time: 30 min.

Original release
- Network: Times Now
- Release: 3 January 2009 – present

Times Drive is an automobile news publisher in India for car news, bikes news and it also features Indian motoring show on Times Now. Its first telecast was aired on 3 January 2009.

== Segments ==
The show has three segments. The show opens with a review of a premium / important car or a comparison of cars within a segment. This is followed by the news from the Indian domestic as well as international auto marketplace. The second segment generally features reviews of current car model upgrades and a feature on buying a used car. The third segment generally features an interview with a celebrity driving his/her car. Prominent celebrities featured on the show include Michael Schumacher, David Coulthard, Ajay Devgan, John Abraham, Rahul Bajaj amongst others. The show has also run special episodes on major racing events like the 2009 Singapore Grand Prix and the Raid de Himalaya.
