= Delivery Hero =

German multinational food delivery company

Delivery Hero SE
- Type: Public (Societas Europaea)
- Traded as: FWB: DHER; MDAX component
- ISIN: DE000A2E4K43
- Industry: Online food ordering
- Founded: 2011; 15 years ago
- Founders: Niklas Östberg; Kolja Hebenstreit; Markus Fuhrmann; Lukasz Gadowski
- Headquarters: Berlin, Germany
- Area served: Worldwide
- Services: Food delivery
- Revenue: ▲€13.7 billion (2025)
- Operating income: ▲€723 million (2025)
- Net income: ▲€935 million (2025)
- Total assets: ▲€19.7 billion (2025)
- Total equity: ▲€10.0 billion (2025)
- Owner: Uber (37%)
- Number of employees: 31,400 (2025)
- Subsidiaries: Foodora; Foodpanda; Glovo; PedidosYa; Talabat; Baedal Minjok; Yemeksepeti
- Website: deliveryhero.com

Delivery Hero SE is a German multinational online food ordering and food delivery company headquartered in Berlin, Germany. Founded in 2011, the company operates an international network spanning over 60 countries across Europe, Asia, Africa, Latin America, and the Middle East, partnering with hundreds of thousands of restaurants and local businesses. Delivery Hero has also expanded into quick commerce, a category focused on delivering small-batch orders and groceries in under an hour.

The company relies heavily on a gig economy operational model, utilizing a network of independent couriers dispatched via smartphone applications to execute deliveries. This employment classification policy has made Delivery Hero the subject of ongoing legal challenges, labor disputes, and regulatory scrutiny globally, which in some instances have led to or accelerated the shutdown of its local operations in certain markets.

== History ==
Delivery Hero Holding was founded in Berlin by Niklas Östberg, Kolja Hebenstreit, Markus Fuhrmann and Lukasz Gadowski in May 2011, with the goal of turning Delivery Hero into a global online food ordering platform. Under the leadership of Niklas Östberg and Fabian Siegel, Delivery Hero first expanded to Australia and the United Kingdom in 2011. In early 2012 the enterprise acquired Lieferheld in Germany and acquired a stake in Foodarena, Switzerland.

Delivery Hero then raised €25 million in new funding to finance acquisitions in four European countries: Sweden, Finland, Austria and Poland. In August 2012 Delivery Hero started expanding in both South Korea and China through YoGiYo and Aimifan and the Asian expansion continued in 2013 when Delivery Hero increased investment in TastyKhana following a successful cooperation period.

In 2012 and 2013, the harsh competition between the various delivery service online portals led the German press to dub the events as cyberwar between the big web-portals. There were reports of frequent Denial-of-service attacks against each portal, accusations of data stealing as well as numerous lawsuits of the portals against each other. Delivery Hero was one of the more aggressive actors, and in 2012, the Delivery Hero office in Berlin was raided by police and the prosecution pressed charges against the Delivery Hero management. Delivery Hero was prosecuted for perpetrating DoS attacks against its competitors and stealing data from the other web services.

In 2014, Delivery Hero acquired a controlling stake in Latin American market leader PedidosYa and in August 2014 the group acquired German market leader and rival, pizza.de.

According to TNW Tech5 2014, Delivery Hero was one of Germany's top three fastest growing startups at that time.

In April 2015, Delivery Hero acquired South Korean delivery service Baedaltong, one of the chief competitors of its own YoGiYo service. One month later Delivery Hero bought the Turkish competitor Yemeksepeti for 530 million Euro, which was the largest acquisition in this business sector to date. In October 2015 Delivery Hero also acquired Munich-based food delivery service Foodora from Rocket Internet.

In May 2015, the company acquired e-food.gr, one of the largest food delivery players in Greece.

On 10 December 2016, Delivery Hero acquired Singapore-based Foodpanda, a company valued at an estimated $3 billion at that time.

In December 2016, the company announced the sale of its UK business Hungryhouse to Just Eat for at least £200m. However, the deal needed to be cleared by the Competition and Markets Authority of the UK before completion. On 12 October 2017, the CMA gave preliminary approval for Just Eat to acquire its smaller rival.

In 2016, the company was valued at 2 billion euros. Delivery Hero went public in a listing on the Frankfurt Stock Exchange on 30 June 2017. The market valued it at 4 billion euros (twice as much as its original value). The listing was the largest by a European technology business in almost two years. Delivery Hero raised almost €1bn from the offering.

In February 2018, Delivery Hero acquired deliveras.gr, a food delivery service in Greece.

In December 2018, Delivery Hero announced the sale of its German operations to its Dutch competitor Takeaway.com (now Just Eat Takeaway) for approximately €930 million. The transaction, completed in April 2019, included the Lieferheld and Pizza.de platforms, alongside the German business of foodora. Following the acquisition, Takeaway.com migrated all restaurants and customer bases to its German platform, Lieferando.

The German stock exchange Deutsche Börse announced on 19 August 2020 that Delivery Hero will replace Wirecard in Germany's leading index DAX.

In August 2020, Delivery Hero acquired Instashop for 360 million dollars, the largest price ever commanded by a Greek startup. The deal has also resulted in a big win for founders and investors, Jabbar Group and Venture Friends the two Venture Capital firms who invested early on in Instashop.

In December 2020, Delivery Hero announced that it would take control of South Korea's biggest food delivery app, Woowa Brothers Corp., at a $4 billion valuation. As part of the transaction, Delivery Hero and the management of Woowa have entered into a strategic partnership regarding the operations of Delivery Hero and Woowa in the Asia Pacific region, and will be able to mutually leverage market insights, technology, and operational best practices.

In May 2021, Delivery Hero restarted its German operations following the entry of competitors Uber Eats and Wolt. However, it once again exited the German market in December, citing high costs.

In May 2024, Uber announced its intention to acquire the foodpanda business in Taiwan for approximately $950 million in cash; however, Taiwan’s Fair Trade Commission blocked the deal in December 2024 and Uber ultimately terminated the agreement in March 2025 without appealing, paying a termination fee of about $250 million.

Delivery Hero officially ceased Foodpanda operations in Thailand on May 23, 2025. Prior to the shutdown, Foodpanda entered into an agreement with local delivery platform Robinhood (operated by the Yip In Tsoi Group), transitioning its delivery riders, restaurant partners, and users to the Thai service. The shutdown ended foodpanda's 13-year presence in the country.

In March 2026, the company reached an alternative agreement to sell its foodpanda operations in Taiwan to regional competitor Grab for $600 million in cash. Concurrently, under pressure from activist shareholders to rapidly divest non-core operations, JPMorgan Chase was appointed to explore a potential ₩8 trillion ($5.37 billion) sale of Woowa Brothers, the operator of South Korea's dominant delivery platform, Baedal Minjok (Baemin). Amidst these major structural updates, long-time co-founder and CEO Niklas Östberg announced his decision to step down from his position by March 31, 2027, prompting the Supervisory Board to launch a global search for his successor.

In July 2026, Delivery Hero reached an agreement with Uber to be acquired for $14.8 billion.

== Investment ==
In November 2011, Delivery Hero received its first investment funding. In this financing round Team Europe, HV Capital, Tengelmann Ventures, Kite Ventures and ru-Net together invested €4 million. The second funding round took place in April 2012. This time the existing investors raised their investments by €25 million to support the international growth of the enterprise. In August 2012 Delivery Hero received an additional €40 million funded primarily by Kite Ventures and Kreos Capital. Venture capital firm Target Global invested in Delivery Hero in 2013. A Series D financing round saw Delivery Hero receive $30 million from Phenomen Ventures in the latest Series D financing round.

In January 2014, Delivery Hero announced a Series E financing of $88 million led by Insight Venture Partners. A further $85m followed in April 2014 and was used to strengthen Delivery Hero's presence in core markets.

In September 2014, a further $350m of investment was secured from existing partners and Swedish fund Vostok Nafta. This was the largest investment in a European start up since 2009. In December 2014 the company raised another €287 Million from Rocket Internet. The total investment size by Rocket Internet was €496 Million in primary and secondary for a 30% stake in Delivery Hero. Three months later Rocket Internet increased its stake in Delivery Hero to 39%. In February 2018, Rocket Internet reduced its stake in Delivery Hero. As per the latest happening, the shareholding of Rocket Internet in Delivery Hero has reduced from 24.3% to 21.2%.

In January 2017, CEO Niklas Östberg announced that he wanted his company to be ready for an IPO in the second quarter of that year. Delivery Hero would focus on the integration of the recently acquired competitor Foodpanda. According to manager magazin, he was aiming at a valuation of about 3.5 billion Euros.

In May 2017, Naspers, a global internet and entertainment group and one of the world's largest technology investors, invested EUR 387 million in Delivery Hero. After increasing its stake in September 2017, Naspers today holds a stake of app. 26% in Delivery Hero, and so became the largest shareholder of the company.

In December 2017, Delivery Hero led the Series B funding round of Rappi, the largest on-demand delivery company in Latam, operating in 5 countries with over 30,000 couriers. Delivery Hero invested $105M and now holds a stake of 20%, becoming the largest shareholder of the company and bringing Niklas Oestberg to its board of directors. Despite this investment, Rappi will continue to operate as an independent company for the time being. Furthermore, the company owns 83.4% of Spanish startup Glovo, acquiring an additional 39.4% stake in December 2021 after its initial 44%.

In March 2021, the Dutch investment giant Prosus increased its stake in Delivery Hero by 8.2% to 24.99%, through its Dutch subsidiary MIH Food Holdings, making it effectively the largest shareholder in Delivery Hero. Prosus is the international internet assets division of Naspers. In the same month, Delivery Hero finalized the $4 billion acquisition of Woowa Brothers, which operates Baedal Minjok, South Korea's largest food delivery company.

On 31 December 2021, Delivery Hero agreed to acquire an additional 39.4% of Glovo from existing shareholders, valuing Glovo at about €2.3 billion on a fully diluted, debt-free basis and bringing Delivery Hero’s holding to roughly 83% on a non-diluted basis. The deal received regulatory clearances (including Spain’s CNMC in February 2022) and closed on 4 July 2022; the European Commission subsequently described Delivery Hero as having acquired sole control of Glovo in July 2022.

In April 2024, it was reported that activist investor Sachem Head built a 3.6% stake in Delivery Hero. Sachem Head had earlier bought a 5.2% stake in British competitor, Deliveroo.

In May 2024, alongside the Taiwan commercial discussions, Uber executed a separate share purchase agreement to invest $300 million in newly issued ordinary shares of Delivery Hero, a financial position that remained unaffected when the foodpanda Taiwan acquisition was subsequently blocked and terminated.

In August 2025, Naspers, through its international tech investor subsidiary Prosus, secured European Commission antitrust approval for its acquisition of Just Eat Takeaway, conditional on a commitment to significantly reduce its 27.4% stake in rival Delivery Hero. To meet these regulatory obligations, Prosus began actively selling down its holding, starting with a 4.5% stake sale to Uber in April 2026, followed by a 5% interest sale for $335 million in May 2026 to push its total holding towards a 15%–20% threshold. In June 2026, the European Commission officially granted Prosus an extension to implement the remaining mandated share divestments.

On 9 December 2025, Delivery Hero's stock jumped 13.7% after the company said it was evaluating its strategic options such as partnerships for select country operations and capital allocation measures.

In May 2026, Delivery Hero confirmed it had received an indicative, €10 billion takeover proposal from Uber Technologies at €33 per share, which was initially rejected; however, negotiations continued and Uber subsequently raised its investment stake in the company to nearly 37% by acquiring shares from activist investor Aspex Management. In July 2026, it was revealed that Uber had abruptly paused its planned food delivery expansion into five European markets, in order to smooth potential European Union antitrust reviews regarding these ongoing takeover talks.

In July 2026, Delivery Hero was acquired by Uber for $14.8 billion.

== Acquisitions ==
Delivery Hero has made a variety of mergers and acquisitions, including:

- 2012: Lieferheld (Germany), OnlinePizza (Sweden), PizzaPortal (Poland), Pizza-Online (Finland)
- 2013: Hungryhouse (UK)
- 2014: PedidosYa (Uruguay and Argentina), Clickdelivery (Latin America), DámeJídlo.cz (Czech Republic), Pizza.de (Germany), Baedaltong (Korea)
- 2015: Talabat (MENA), Yemeksepeti (Turkey), e-food (Greece), foodora
- 2016: Foodpanda (Asia)
- 2017: Otlob (Egypt), Carriage (MENA), Appetito24 (Latin America), Foodfly (South Korea)
- 2018: Hipmenu (Europe), Netcomidas (Bolivia)
- 2019: Foody (Cyprus), Zomato food delivery business (MENA), DeliveryRD (Dominican Republic)
- 2020: InstaShop (Europe, the Middle East, and Africa), Appetito24 (Panama)
- 2021: Woowa Brothers (South Korea), Hugo (El Salvador), Glovo (Spain), chefmade (Denmark), Hungry (Denmark)
- 2023: Hunger Station (Saudi Arabia)

== Operations ==
Worldwide footprint of Delivery Hero’s subsidiaries. Foodora Foodpanda Glovo PedidosYa Talabat Baedal Minjok efood Foody Hunger Station Yemeksepeti Former operations

=== Current operations ===
Region	Brand	Countries
Europe	Foodora	Austria, Czech Republic, Hungary, Norway, Sweden
Europe	Glovo	Andorra, Armenia, Bosnia and Herzegovina, Bulgaria, Croatia, Georgia, Italy, Moldova, Montenegro, Poland, Portugal, Romania, Serbia, Spain, Ukraine
Europe	efood	Greece
Europe	Foody	Cyprus
Europe	Yemeksepeti	Turkey
Africa	Glovo	Ivory Coast, Kenya, Morocco, Nigeria, Tunisia, Uganda
Middle East	Talabat	Bahrain, Egypt, Iraq, Jordan, Kuwait, Oman, Qatar, United Arab Emirates
Middle East	HungerStation	Saudi Arabia
Asia	Foodpanda	Bangladesh, Cambodia, Hong Kong, Laos, Malaysia, Myanmar, Pakistan, Philippines, Singapore, Taiwan
Asia	Glovo	Kazakhstan, Kyrgyzstan
Asia	Baedal Minjok	South Korea
Latin America	PedidosYa	Argentina, Bolivia, Chile, Costa Rica, Dominican Republic, Ecuador, El Salvador, Guatemala, Honduras, Nicaragua, Panama, Paraguay, Peru, Uruguay, Venezuela

=== Former operations ===
- Australia: Foodora (2015–2018)
- Brunei: Foodpanda (2014–2018)
- Canada: Foodora (2015–2020)
- China: Waimai Chaoren (2012–2016)
- Denmark: Foodora (2022–2024)
- France: Foodora (2015–2018)
- Germany: Lieferheld (2012–2018), Pizza.de (2014–2018), Foodora (2015–2018), Foodpanda (2021)
- Ghana: Glovo (2021–2024)
- India: Foodpanda (2014–2017)
- Japan: Foodpanda (2021–2022)
- Netherlands: Foodora (2015–2018)
- Russia: Delivero (2012)
- Slovakia: Foodora (2021–2024)
- Slovenia: Glovo (2021–2024)
- Switzerland: Foodarena (2012–2018)
- Thailand: Foodpanda (2012–2025)
- United Kingdom: Hungryhouse (2013–2018)

== Financial figures ==
Year	Revenue (Mio. €)	EBITDA (Mio. €)	# Staff	Source
2013	42	-26	547	
2014	88	-70	1,018	
2015	200	-174	2,843	
2016	297	-107	6,848	
2017	544	-190	12,882	
2018	655	-100	16,627	
2019	1,238	-431	22,515	
2020	2,472	-568	43,838	
2021	5,856	-958	45,445	
2022	9,218	-465	51,118	
2023	10,463	253.6	47,981	
2024	11,461	521.4	35,247	
2025	13,700	942.0	31,400	

== Controversies ==
=== Classification of couriers as independent contractors ===
In contrast to Delivery Hero's 2018 annual report, which includes "riders" as employees, Delivery Hero's national subsidiaries (Foodora, Foodpanda, etc.) usually classify their workers as independent contractors and not employees. This classification frees Delivery Hero from responsibilities towards its workers, including the right to workers' compensation, sick leave, overtime, unemployment benefits, hazard pay, and protections against wrongful termination of employment or firing.

==== Pro-employee rulings ====
Couriers working for Delivery Hero's brands have mounted campaigns to assert their rights, including several successful legal battles. In Australia and Canada, these campaigns led to DH subsidiary Foodora's shutdown in the countries.

In each case, Foodora maintained that the shutdowns were carried out in response to market forces. However, Delivery Hero's 2018 Annual Report shows that the company does indeed assess country-by-country the costs and risks of government policies including social security, stating:

"Country specific and economic requirements, including employment legislation and social security, increase the complexity of the rider management as part of the own delivery services. The constant analysis of regulatory developments is needed to find the best approach in advancing the logistics business. Non-compliance with regulatory requirements may lead to higher rider costs and possible non-compliance fines. This also includes the risk of unavailability of rider personnel restraining the further expansion of the logistic services. This risk is considered as medium."

==== Australia ====
In 2018 Foodora Australia abruptly shut down operations while facing several lawsuits: including one from the country's Fair Work Ombudsman which accused the company of sham contracting, and several court cases relating to unpaid benefits and wrongful dismissal.

The Transport Workers Union subsequently accused Foodora of shutting down to "avoid responsibility for paying its riders millions of dollars in backpay as a result of wage theft."

==== Canada ====
In 2019, Foodora couriers Montreal and Toronto began organizing. Subsequently, with the support of the Canadian Union of Postal Workers, Foodsters United, a group of couriers in Ontario, organized a vote on whether or not to unionize with the CUPW. Foodora Canada then challenged the vote prior to the announcement of results, on the basis that Foodora couriers were independent contractors and therefore did not have the right to unionize.

The Ontario Labour Relations Board then ruled that Foodora was misclassifying couriers as independent contractors, and, in a decision which was widely considered a win for couriers, ordered Foodora to consider its couriers "dependent contractors", a new category which affords workers some of the rights of employees. The decision only applied to couriers in Ontario, but was considered to be precedent setting.

In April 2020, two months after Ontario Labour Relations Board decision, Foodora Canada announced that it was shutting down, citing oversaturation of the Canadian market.

==== Greece ====
In 2021, e-food.gr couriers in Greece were given an ultimatum to switch their working relationship from employees to independent contractors / freelancers. If not, they would not have their employment contracts renewed. This led to social media backlash over workers' rights. The company was forced to recall their decision due to public outcry, and offered contract renewals to its employees if they wish. Following further public scrutiny and strikes organized by its delivery workers, the company eventually promised to upgrade all delivery employees' employment contracts to indefinite duration contracts, signifying a victory for the delivery workers.

=== Monopolistic behaviour ===
Talabat and Carriage, both of which are owned by Delivery Hero, were sued by the Kuwait Competition Protection Authority (CPA) in 2019 after they refused to pay fines totalling more than 5 million KWD (~$16.5 million) due to their monopolistic acts in their contracts with restaurants.

=== Regulatory fines ===
In 2023, Germany's Federal Financial Supervisory Authority (BaFin) imposed a 630,000 euro administrative fine on Delivery Hero for failing to disclose inside information.

In June 2025, the European Commission fined Delivery Hero and its subsidiary Glovo a combined €329 million for participating in an antitrust cartel. The companies were found to have engaged in anti-competitive practices between 2018 and 2022, including a no-poach agreement and the exchange of commercially sensitive information, before Delivery Hero acquired sole control of Glovo in July 2022. Delivery Hero received a €223 million fine, while Glovo was fined €105.7 million, with both firms receiving a 10% reduction for acknowledging their involvement.

=== Controversy over caged egg sourcing on Delivery Hero platforms ===
In 2026, Delivery Hero faced criticism from animal welfare organizations regarding its lack of a global commitment to eliminate caged eggs from products and meals offered across its platforms. Advocacy groups called on the company to adopt higher animal welfare standards, noting that several competitors had already committed to transitioning to cage-free egg sourcing. The issue was highlighted through consumer awareness campaigns and public criticism concerning the continued availability of caged egg products across Delivery Hero’s platforms.
