= Waiter.com =

Online restaurant delivery service

Waiter.Com
- Founded: December 1995
- Founders: Craig Cohen, Michael Adelberg
- Headquarters: Sunnyvale, California, United States
- Website: waiter.com

Waiter.com, also formerly known as World Wide Waiter, is an online restaurant delivery service that went online in early December 1995. It was founded by two Stanford University Business School graduates Craig Cohen and Michael Adelberg. Although Waiter.com does service residential areas and takeout orders, its main focus is delivering for corporate business mealtime orders and catered meals. Waiter.com primarily operates in California, in the Bay Area.

== History ==
Waiter.com is considered the first online restaurant delivery service; it pioneered the concept of online restaurant ordering in 1995 when it offered meal options from 60 Silicon Valley partner restaurants, expanding to over 1,300 restaurants in 2017.

The first office was located in Los Altos, but is now situated in Sunnyvale, California.

Waiter.com serves multiple locations throughout the United States, including major cities like San Francisco, Dallas, Raleigh/Durham, Seattle, Austin, and Los Angeles. In January 2020, Waiter.com expanded its service to Portland, Oregon through its acquisition of local delivery company Portland Pedal Power.
