= Glovo =

Spanish on-demand courier service

- Type: Subsidiary
- Industry: Online food ordering and delivery
- Founded: February 2015
- Founders: Oscar Pierre; Sacha Michaud
- Headquarters: Barcelona, Spain
- Areas served: Multiple countries
- Owner: Delivery Hero (2022–present)
- Website: www.glovoapp.com

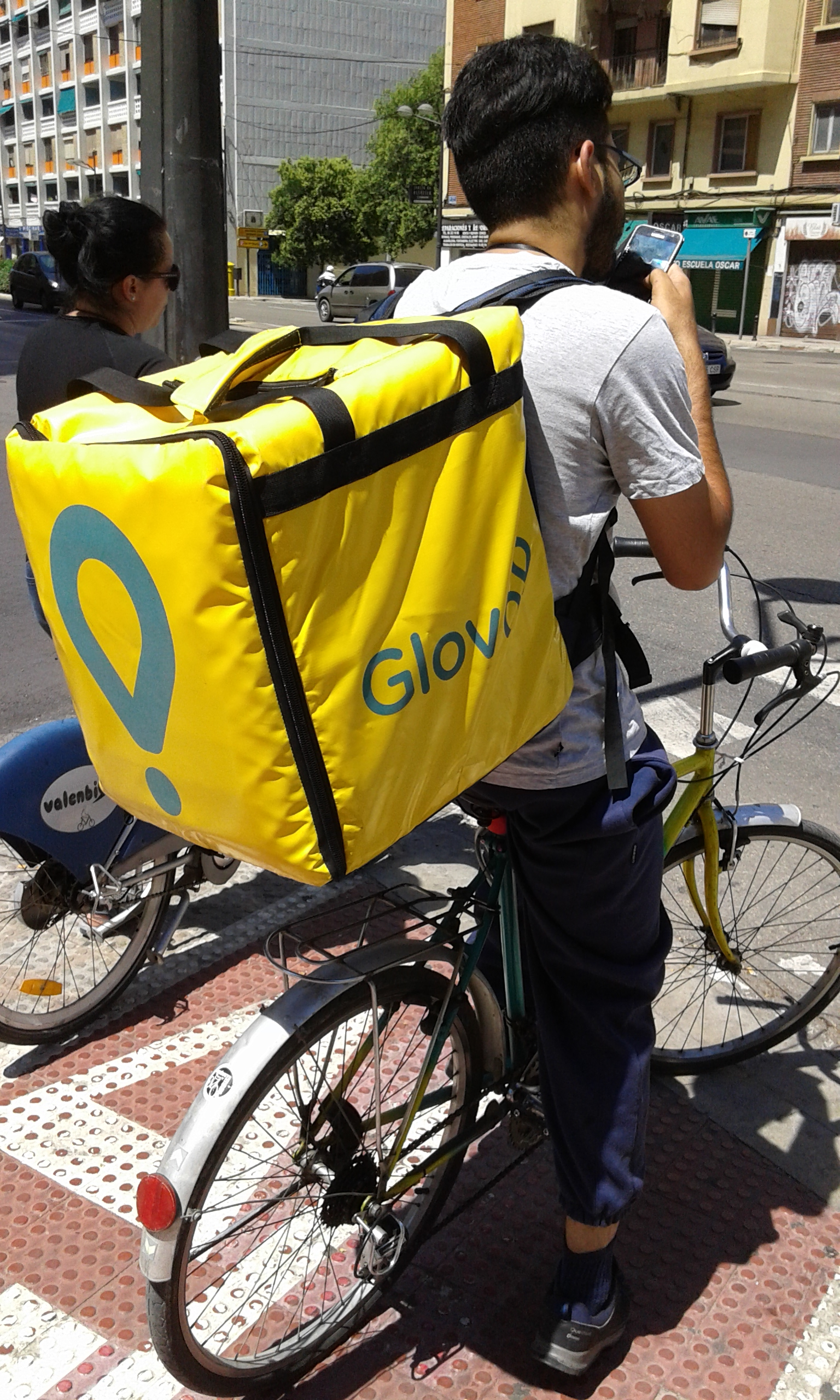
Bike courier

Glovo is a Spanish on-demand delivery company headquartered in Barcelona. It operates a mobile app that connects customers with local businesses and couriers for deliveries of food, groceries and other items. Glovo was founded in 2015 by Oscar Pierre and Sacha Michaud. Since July 2022, it has been majority-owned by the German delivery company Delivery Hero.

== History ==
Glovo began operating in 2015 and expanded from Spain into other markets after raising venture funding. In 2017, it announced a €30 million Series B funding round led by Rakuten Capital and Cathay Innovation.

In April 2019, Glovo raised €150 million to finance international expansion. In December 2019, Glovo announced another €150 million funding round and said the raise pushed its valuation above US$1 billion.

In September 2020, Delivery Hero agreed to acquire Glovo's Latin American operations in a deal valued at up to €230 million (including an earn-out).

In December 2021, Delivery Hero agreed to increase its stake in Glovo and become the majority shareholder. Delivery Hero said the transaction closed in July 2022, leaving it with approximately 94% of Glovo's shares on a non-diluted basis.

== Operations ==
Glovo operates a multi-sided marketplace that enables users to place orders from participating restaurants, grocery stores and other retailers, which are then delivered by couriers arranged through the platform. A 2022 Reuters report described Glovo as operating in 23 countries at that time.

== Response to the Russian invasion of Ukraine ==
After the Russian invasion of Ukraine began in February 2022, Glovo temporarily suspended operations in Ukraine, later resuming limited service; Reuters reported that the company said it would provide humanitarian support through the platform.

== Controversies ==
=== Labour classification ===
Glovo has faced legal and regulatory disputes in Spain over the employment status of its couriers. In September 2022, Spain's labour ministry announced a fine of about €79 million over alleged labour-law violations related to the hiring of riders.

In January 2023, Spanish authorities announced an additional fine of €57 million, citing alleged misclassification of riders and other labour violations.

In December 2024, Delivery Hero said Glovo would transition its riders in Spain to employee status, citing legal uncertainty around the freelance model.

=== Competition law ===
On 2 June 2025, the European Commission fined Delivery Hero and Glovo a combined €329 million for participating in an online food delivery cartel, including a no-poach agreement and the exchange of commercially sensitive information.

== See also ==
- Cyclologistics
