= Online food ordering =

Process of ordering food via a website or other application

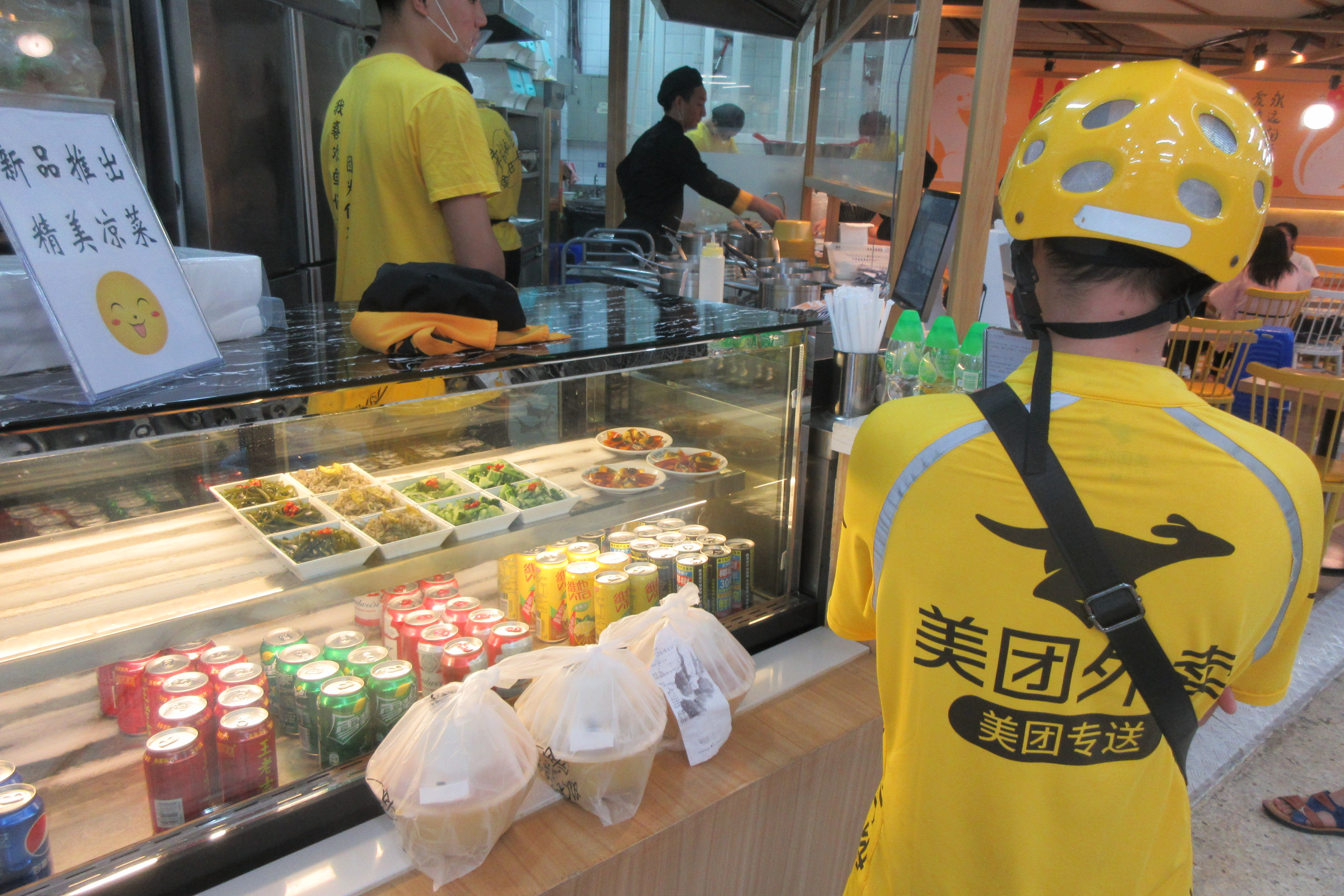
Food delivery workers for the Chinese company Meituan wear yellow uniforms.

Online food ordering is the process of ordering food, for delivery or self-pickup, from a website or other application.

The product can be either ready-to-eat food (e.g., direct from a home-kitchen, restaurant, or a virtual restaurant) or food that has not been specially prepared for direct consumption (e.g., vegetables direct from a farm/garden, fruits, frozen meats. etc).

Ordering food combined with third-party delivery companies has emerged as a global industry, leading to a "delivery revolution." From 2018 to 2021, global revenues for the online food delivery sector rose from $90 billion to $294 billion. Since then, many restaurants have also switched to online menus.

== History ==
The first online food order was a pizza from Pizza Hut in 1994. Evolving from phone-based ordering, ordering food from internet has improved both speed and accuracy.

The online food ordering market has increased in the U.S with 40 percent of U.S adults reporting having ordered their food online once as of 2011. The online food ordering market includes foods prepared by restaurants, prepared by independent people, and groceries being ordered online and then picked up or delivered.

The first online food ordering service, World Wide Waiter (now known as Waiter.com), was founded in 1995. The site originally serviced only northern California, later expanding to several additional cities in the United States.

By the late 2000s, major pizza chains had created their own mobile applications and started doing 20–30 percent of their business online. With increased smartphone penetration, and the growth of both Uber and the sharing economy, food delivery startups started to receive more attention. In 2010, Snapfinger, who is a multi-restaurant ordering website, had a growth in their mobile food orders by 17 percent in one year.

By 2015, online ordering began overtaking phone ordering.

In 2015, China's online food ordering and delivery market grew from 0.15 billion yuan to 44.25 billion yuan.

As of September 2016, online delivery accounted for about 3 percent of the 61 billion U.S. restaurant transactions.

According to research conducted by the NDP Group in 2018, online restaurant ordering was growing 300% faster than dine-in traffic at that time. The same year, MSN News reported that it had "started to become the norm" as a result of its convenience and the option to integrate payments, and speculated that "subscription delivery of prepared food could potentially spell the end of cooking at home".

In a 2019 market study of restaurant delivery services, the global market for online-ordered prepared food delivery was estimated at $94 billion and is estimated to grow at just over 9 percent a year, reaching $134.5 billion in 2023. The study defined the market as 1)"meals ordered online which are directly delivered by the restaurant, no matter if ordered via a platform (e.g. Delivery Hero) or a restaurant website (e.g. Domino's)"; 2) online meal orders and deliveries "both carried out by a platform" (Deliveroo, Uber Eats, e.g.); 3) "online orders that are picked up in the restaurant" by the customer. It does not include phone orders.

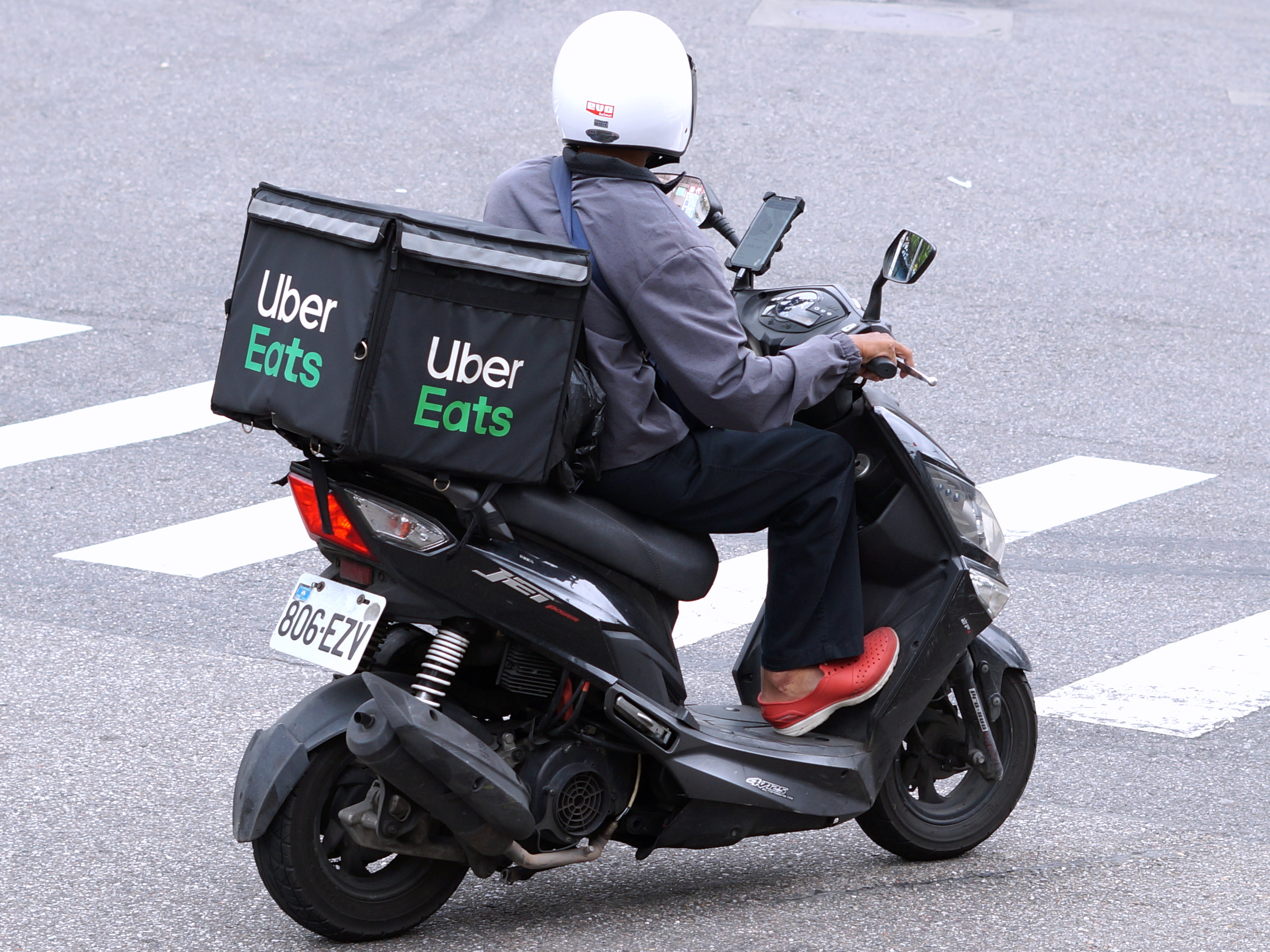
Uber Eats delivery driver

After 2020, COVID-19 significantly boosted online food delivery usage world wide. Following the pandemic, a permanent shift toward contactless digital menu continues, accelerating the adoption of table-side online ordering. The mobile app offers more interactive features and meals flow directly from the kitchen, significantly reducing the reliance on traditional front-of-house waitstaff.

== Types ==
=== Traditional food delivery services ===
Traditional food delivery services have long been a part of the food industry, with local restaurants and fast-food chains offering home delivery or takeout options. These services often rely on in-house or third-party delivery drivers who transport prepared meals directly from the restaurant to the customer. Dominos, Pizza Hut, and Papa John's are examples of established global brands that have been offering delivery services for decades.

=== Restaurant-controlled ===
In restaurant-controlled online food ordering, the restaurants create their own website and app, or choose to hire a delivery vendor. If they choose to create their own website, they make sure to obtain software that manages the orders efficiently, meaning it has the capability to manage different orders at once. When they hire a vendor, the restaurant pays for a monthly fee or percentage-based fees. The vendor covers the developmental costs.

A customer can choose to have the food delivered or for pick-up/take-away. The process consists of a customer choosing the restaurant of their choice, scanning the menu items, choosing an item, and finally choosing for pick-up or delivery. Payment is then administered by paying with a credit card or debit card through the app or website or in cash at the restaurant when going to pickup. The website and app inform the customer of the food quality, duration of food preparation, and when the food is ready for pick-up or the amount of time it will take for delivery. Papa John's is one of the restaurants that created their own Papa John's system, website, and app, and do their own delivery. In 2010, they redesigned their website and launched mobile apps for iPhones, iPads, iPods, Androids Phones, Blackberrys, and Windows Phones.

The preexisting delivery infrastructure of these franchises paired with the online ordering system. In 2010, Papa John's International announced that its online sales had exceeded $2 billion.

=== Independent websites ===
In this case, a person cooks and offers meals or kits via their website, which are then directly sent to consumers. The consumer chooses which meal and how many meals they want sent to their office or home, and pays depending on the meals or the program they are interested in. People choose to order meals from other people for different reasons: not wanting or having time to cook, wanting to eat home-cooked meals, or to lose weight by eating healthy foods. Examples of this type of service include DineWise, NutriSystem, Chef's Diet, etc.

=== Food cooperatives ===
Some food cooperatives like Macomb Co-op allow members to place orders of locally grown and/or produced food online and pick up and pay for their orders at a central location.

=== Delivery platforms ===
The riders and drivers for nearly all independent restaurant delivery app services are independent contractors, having the flexibility to choose when they work. In Australia, specifically riders for the food app of Foodora, consider themselves employees because they sometimes work full time hours, are required to wear uniforms, and run shift system.

However, food delivery riders and drivers usually do not receive any insurance coverage, protective gear, or sick pay as independent contractors, which have led to some asking for improved safety standards. In response, Deliveroo gave riders a helmet with a GoPro camera to record any problems they may face, specifically with criminals. The riders have the opportunity to raise safety concerns about delivery areas in the app.

=== Meal-Kit delivery services ===
Another segment within the global food delivery industry is meal-kit delivery services, which provide customers with pre-portioned ingredients and recipes to prepare meals at home. Meal-kit delivery services such as Blue Apron, HelloFresh, and Sun Basket have gained popularity, particularly among health-conscious consumers and those with busy lifestyles. These services offer the convenience of food delivery combined with the experience of home cooking, catering to a growing demand for healthy and personalized meal options.

== Virtual restaurants ==
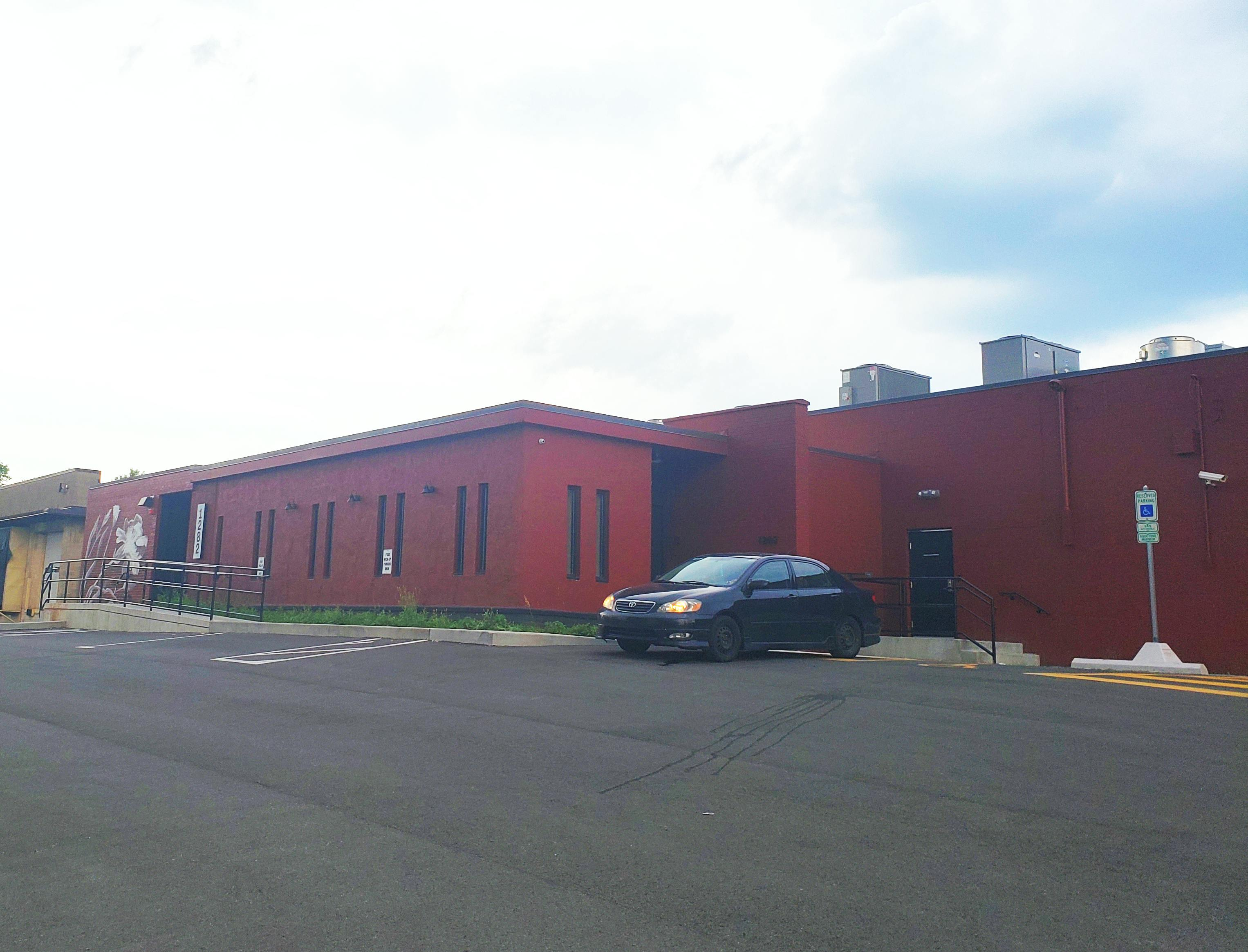
A virtual restaurant in Columbus, Ohio in 2020

As the food delivery sector has grown, businesses have turned to delivery-only virtual restaurants, also known as ghost kitchens, to fill the need for inexpensive kitchen space to handle the increased volume. A ghost kitchen site will be purpose-built to be delivery-only and have separate areas of stoves, refrigeration and storage space to accommodate food preparation teams of several different restaurants. As they are often located in less densely populated areas of a city, they also have parking areas for the delivery vehicles. Companies providing this service are often subsidiaries of the delivery companies. Ghost kitchens also allow for the creation of virtual restaurant brands—restaurants that exist only online, with no brick-and-mortar presence. The ghost kitchen has also gradually developed into a shared space ghost kitchen. They simultaneously share the same space for multiple ghost kitchens and then equip them with complete tableware and space.

== See also ==
- Dark store – Retail outlet that only focuses on online shopping
- Instacart — grocery delivery
- List of restaurant terminology
- Online grocer – Food store supporting online purchases
- Online supermarkets – Large format of grocery store
- Meals on Wheels – Charitable organization
