= List of gig economy companies =

The following is a list of gig economy companies. The list includes only companies that have been noted by sources as being former or current gig economy companies.

== Background ==
The Congressional Research Service defines the "gig economy" as:

the collection of markets that match providers to consumers on a gig (or job) basis in support of on-demand commerce. In the basic model, gig workers enter into formal agreements with on-demand companies to provide services to company's clients. Prospective clients request services through an Internet-based technological platform or smartphone application that allows them to search for providers or to specify jobs. Providers (gig workers) engaged by the on-demand company provide the requested service and are compensated for the jobs.

In 2019, Queensland University of Technology published a report stating 7% of Australians participate in the gig economy. 10% of the American workforce participated in the gig economy in 2018. According to a 2019 Bank of Canada report, 18% of Canadians worked in the gig economy for non-recreational reasons. Around 2018, 15% of China's workforce, representing over 110 million people, was involved in the gig economy. In 2019, the World Bank estimated that globally, fewer than 0.5% of people in the "active labor force" take part in the gig economy.

== List of gig economy companies ==
=== Accommodation ===
Company	Based in	Description
Airbnb	United States	An online home rental service
CouchSurfing	United States	An online home rental service
FlipKey	United States	An online home rental marketplace
Peerspace	United States	An online hourly venue rental service
Onefinestay	United Kingdom	An online rental service
Vrbo/HomeAway	United States	An online home rental service. In July 2020, HomeAway was merged with Vrbo.
Xiaozhu	China	An online short-term home and apartment rental platform

=== Artificial intelligence ===
Company	Based in	Description
Appen	Australia	AI data-annotation company using remote crowd workers
Hive	United States	AI data-labeling company using distributed gig workers
Mercor	United States	AI training platform using expert independent contractors
Scale AI	United States	AI data platform using gig workers for labeling and evaluation
Surge AI	United States	AI data-annotation company using contractors for model training
Toloka	Netherlands	AI data platform using human experts for training and evaluation

=== Caregiving ===
Company	Based in	Description
Care.com	United States (Note: Service available worldwide in several different countries. See individual company page(s) for details.)	An online platform for hiring caregivers
Sittercity.com	United States	An online platform for hiring caregivers
Soothe	United States	An online massage service provider
UrbanSitter	United States	An online babysitter company

=== Delivery ===
Company	Based in	Description
Amazon Flex	United States	An online delivery service
Cargomatic	United States	An online delivery platform that connects drivers with customers
CitySprint	United Kingdom	A courier service
Deliv	United States	An online delivery service
DPDgroup	France	An online parcel delivery service
Dunzo	India	An online delivery service
eCourier	United Kingdom	A courier service
ekart	India	A courier service
GoPuff	United States	A convenience store delivery service
Hermes Group	Germany (Note: Service currently only available in select European countries.)	An online delivery company
Lalamove	Hong Kong	An online delivery service
Rappi	Colombia (Note: Service currently only available in South America)	An online delivery service
Roadie	United States	Online delivery
Shipt	United States	An online delivery service
Shyp	United States	Was a courier service company. Now dissolved.
Spark Driver	United States	A delivery platform operated by Walmart using independent drivers
UK Mail	United Kingdom	An online parcel delivery service
Yodel	United Kingdom	An online parcel delivery service

==== Grocery ====
Company	Based in	Description
Farmdrop	United Kingdom	An online grocer with food sourced from local farmers
BigBasket	India	An online grocery delivery service
Blinkit	India	An online grocery delivery service
The Food Assembly	France	An online farmers' market
honestbee	Singapore (Note: Service currently only available in select Asian countries.)	Was an online grocery and food delivery service. Now dissolved.
Instacart	United States (Note: Service currently only available in USA and Canada.)	An Internet-based grocery delivery service
Zepto	India	An online grocery delivery service

==== Food ====
Company	Based in	Description
Deliveroo	United Kingdom	An online food delivery company
DoorDash	United States	Online food delivery
Delivery Hero	Germany	Online food delivery
Drizly	United States	An alcohol delivery service
EatStreet	United States	An online food ordering service
Ele.me	China	An online food delivery service
Favor Delivery	United States	An online food delivery service
Foodora	Germany	An online food delivery service
Foodpanda	Germany	An online food delivery platform
Glovo	Spain	An online food delivery service
Grubhub	United States	Online food delivery
iFood	Brazil	An online food delivery service
Just Eat	United Kingdom	Online takeaway food delivery
Just Eat Takeaway	Netherlands	Online food delivery
Menulog	Australia	Online food delivery
Munchery	United States	Was an online food delivery service
OrderUp	United States	Was an online food delivery service
PedidosYa	Uruguay	An online food delivery and quick-commerce platform
Postmates	United States	Delivers restaurant-prepared meals and other goods
Seamless	United States	An online food delivery service. Now a subsidiary of Grubhub
SkipTheDishes	Canada	An online restaurant ordering and food delivery company
Swiggy	India	An online food delivery platform
Uber Eats	United States	An online food delivery platform
Wolt	Finland	Online food delivery
Zomato	India	An online food delivery platform

=== Education ===
Company	Based in	Description
italki	United States	An online language learning platform
VIPKid	China	An online platform for Chinese students to receive lessons from fluent English-speaking teachers

=== Knowledge Work (Freelancing platforms) ===
Company	Based in	Description
Appen	Australia	A data-annotation and artificial-intelligence training-data platform using online crowdwork
Fiverr	Israel	An online freelancing platform
Airtasker	Australia	An online marketplace for outsourcing tasks
Amazon Mechanical Turk	United States	An online crowdsourcing website for performing tasks
Toloka	United States	An online crowdsourcing website for performing tasks
Figure Eight Inc.	United States	An online work platform to complete tasks
Freelancer.com	Australia	An online freelancing platform
Upwork	United States	An online freelancing platform
Useme	Poland	An online freelancing platform for project settlements, contracts, and invoicing
PeoplePerHour	United Kingdom	An online freelancing platform
Scale AI	United States	An artificial-intelligence data-annotation company whose Remotasks and Outlier platforms use gig workers
Toptal	United States	An online freelancing platform
Hello Alfred	United States	An online platform for completing tasks
InnoCentive	United States	An online platform where problem solvers can receive monetary rewards from organizations

==== Business and technical services ====
Company	Based in	Description
Fiverr	Israel	An online freelancing platform
Andela	United States	An online platform for training software programmers in Africa and connecting them with clients
Catalant	United States	A matchmaking platform for office work. Was formerly known as HourlyNerd
Expert360	Australia	An online platform for matching independent business consultants with clients
Field Agent	United States	A platform for retailers to request in-store information from users
Field Nation	United States	An online marketplace that matches IT and other freelancers with corporate clients
Gigster	United States	An online platform to complete software projects
Liveops	United States	An online platform offering call center services
Kaggle	United States	An online platform for data science competitions
Managed by Q	United States	An online office management platform company
PeoplePerHour	United Kingdom	An online freelancing platform
Shiftgig	United States	An online staffing firm
Toptal	United States	An online freelancing platform
Upwork	United States	An online freelancing platform
WorkMarket	United States	Online platform for businesses to contract technical contracting

==== Creative services ====
Company	Based in	Description
Fiverr	Israel	An online marketplace for freelance services
99designs	Australia	An online platform to connect graphic designers and clients
Crowdspring	United States	An online platform for creative services
Tongal	United States	An online platform that connects businesses in need of creative work with writers and directors

==== Home services ====
Company	Based in	Description
AskforTask	Canada	An online marketplace where people can outsource their daily tasks
Bellhops	United States	An online moving service
GreenPal	United States	An online landscaping network company
Handy	United States	An online home services company
Helpling	United Kingdom	An online platform for cleaning services
HomeAdvisor	United States	An online platform that connects homeowners to contractors
Homejoy	United States	Was an online maid company. Now closed
Pimlico Plumbers	United Kingdom	A plumbing firm
Porch	United States	An online platform that connects homeowners to home improvement contractors
Rover.com	United States	An online dog-walking service
SudShare	United States	An online laundry service
TaskRabbit	United States	An on-demand freelance labor service
Thumbtack	United States	An online platform that connects people to professionals
Wag	United States	An online dog-walking service
YourMechanic	United States	An online platform that connects car owners with mechanics
Urban Company	India	An online home services company

=== Health services ===
Company	Based in	Description
Nomad Health	United States	An online platform that joins freelance physicians and nurses with hospitals
Pager	United States	An online platform that connects healthcare providers and patients
Talkspace	United States	An online platform to connect to therapists
Chunyu	China	An online platform for medical information

=== Legal services ===
Company	Based in	Description
LegalZoom	United States	An online platform that connects consumers with lawyers
Rocket Lawyer	United States; United Kingdom	An online platform that connects consumers with lawyers
UpCounsel	United States	An online marketplace for legal services

=== Retail ===
Company	Based in	Description
Carousell	Singapore	An online marketplace for selling goods
Etsy	United States	An online marketplace for handmade goods
Lazada Group	Singapore	An online marketplace for selling goods
Meituan-Dianping	China	An online food delivery, consumer products and retail service

=== Transportation and parking ===
Company	Based in	Description
Addison Lee	United Kingdom	A minicab firm
Bird	United States	An online electric scooter sharing platform
BlaBlaCar	France	An online marketplace for carpooling
Blacklane	Germany	An online transportation network
BluSmart	India	Was an electric ride-hailing platform; it suspended operations in April 2025.
Bolt	Estonia	An online transportation network company
Bridj	Australia	A private commuter shuttle service
Cabify	Spain	A ridesharing company
Careem	United Arab Emerites	A transportation network company
Carma	Ireland	An online transportation network company
Chariot	United States	Was a commuter shuttle service. Now closed
DiDi	China	An online ride-hailing service
Hello	China	An online platform for bicycle-sharing service
DriveNow	Germany	An online carsharing service
Easy Taxi	Brazil	An online transportation network company
EasyCar	United Kingdom	An online carsharing service
Free Now	Germany	A transportation network company
Getaround	United States	An online car-sharing service
Gett	Israel	A transportation network company
GOGOX	Hong Kong	An online transportation network company
Gojek	Indonesia	An online transportation network company
Grab	Singapore; Indonesia	An online transportation network company
Hailo	United Kingdom	An online transportation network company
HopSkipDrive	United States	A transportation network company for children
inDrive	United States	A ride-hailing, delivery, cargo transportation, and urban-services platform
Juno	United States	An online transportation network company
JustPark	United Kingdom	An online platform that matches drivers with parking spaces
Kakao T	South Korea	An online transportation network company
Lime	United States	An online transportation company
Luxe	United States	An online parking service
Lyft	United States	A transportation network company
Meru Cabs	India	An online ridesharing company
Quiqup	United Kingdom	An online transportation network
Ola Cabs	India	An online transportation company
Sidecar	United States	Was an online transportation company. Now closed
Rapido	India	A bike taxi, ride-hailing, parcel delivery, and third-party logistics platform
Spin	United States	An online scooter sharing platform
Turo	United States	An online carsharing platform
Uber	United States	An online transportation network company
Via	United States	An online transportation network company
ViaVan	Netherlands	An online transportation network company
Wingz	United States	An online transportation network company
Yandex	Russia	An online transportation network company
YourParkingSpace	United Kingdom	An online platform that matches drivers with parking spaces

== See also ==
- Business model
- Peer-to-peer
- Sharing economy
- Temporary work
- Crowdsourcing
- List of multi-level marketing companies
- Lists of occupations
