= Sheila Lirio Marcelo =

Filipino-American entrepreneur

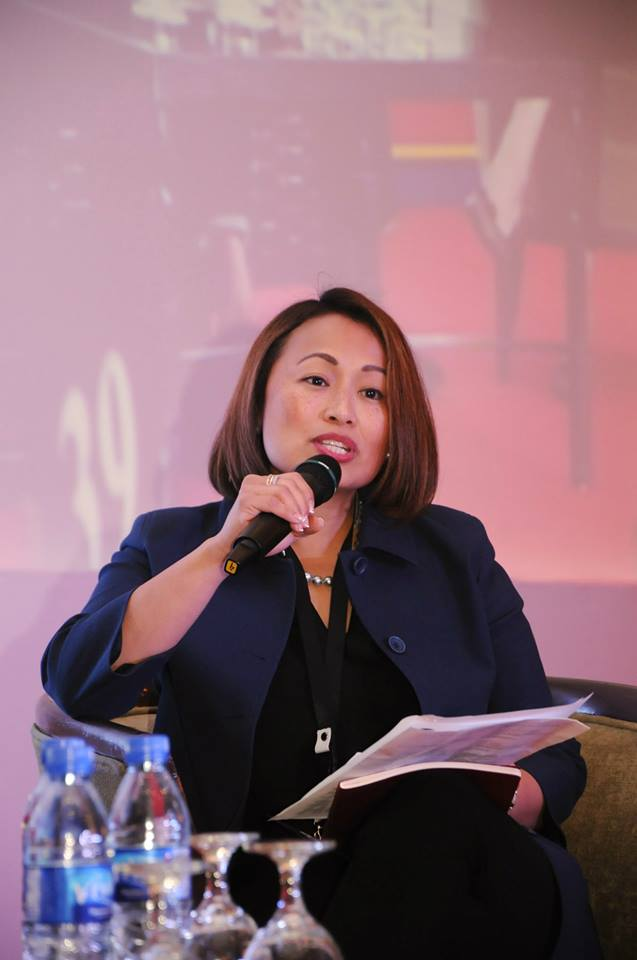
- Marcelo speaking to an audience
- Born: Philippines
- Education: Mount Holyoke College (BA); Harvard University (MBA, JD)
- Known for: Care.com, Ohai.ai

Sheila Lirio Marcelo is a Filipino-American entrepreneur who founded Care.com, an online marketplace for caregiving services. She served as the company's CEO from its founding in 2006 until 2019, when it was acquired by IAC for $500 million. She has since founded education platform Proof of Learn and AI household management company Ohai.ai.

== Early life and education ==
Marcelo was born and raised in the Philippines in a family involved in various businesses including agriculture and transportation. She spent part of her childhood in Houston with her five siblings and attended Brent International School in Baguio at age 11. Marcelo graduated magna cum laude from Mt. Holyoke College with a degree in economics. She later received M.B.A. and J.D. degrees from Harvard University. She had her first child during her undergraduate years and her second son after completing her MBA.

== Career ==
=== Early career ===
Before founding Care.com, Marcelo worked as a consultant at Monitor Company and other firms, served as a teaching fellow at Harvard Business School, and held executive positions at Upromise and TheLadders.com. She also served as an Entrepreneur in residence at Matrix Partners before founding Care.com.

=== Care.com ===
Marcelo founded Care.com in 2006, motivated by her personal difficulties finding childcare and care for her father following a heart attack. The online marketplace connected families with caregivers for children, seniors, pets, and homes. While serving as entrepreneur-in-residence at Matrix Partners, Marcelo met with founders of competing caregiving websites Sittercity.com and another firm to discuss potential investments. Matrix Partners ultimately declined to invest in those companies, and months later provided $3.5 million in Series A funding for Marcelo's Care.com, with Reid Hoffman also participating. In November 2009, The Boston Globe reported allegations that Marcelo had used information from those earlier meetings to develop Care.com. Matrix Partners denied claims of unfair treatment. Between 2006 and 2012, Care.com raised $111 million from investors including Matrix Partners, New Enterprise Associates, USAA, and Institutional Venture Partners. The company went public on January 24, 2014. Marcelo served as CEO until August 2019, when she transitioned to executive chairwoman. In December 2019, IAC acquired the company for $500 million, taking it private.

=== Later ventures ===
In January 2022, Marcelo founded Proof of Learn, an education technology platform that raised $15 million in funding led by New Enterprise Associates. In 2024, she launched Ohai.ai, which offers an AI-powered household assistant for managing family schedules and tasks via text messaging. The company raised $6 million in seed funding from Eniac Ventures and LifeX Ventures.

== Recognition ==
Marcelo has received recognition within the technology and business communities. She was named to Fortune Magazine's list of most powerful women entrepreneurs (2009), The Boston Globe's most powerful women in Boston tech, and received the Ernst & Young Entrepreneur of the Year Award (2010). The World Economic Forum named her a Young Global Leader in 2011. In 2014, she received the Harvard Business School alumni award and the Filipino Heritage Award (Pamana ng Pilipino) from President Benigno Aquino III of the Philippines. In 2015, Mt. Holyoke College awarded her an honorary doctorate in humane letters.
