= Lee Bird =

American businessman (born 1964)

- Born: Lewis Leo Bird III; May 14, 1964 (age 62); Cape Cod, Massachusetts, United States
- Education: Ithaca College, Babson College
- Occupation: Business executive
- Known for: Former CEO of the At Home Group
- Spouse: Linda Partridge (m. 1986)
- Children: 8

Lewis Leo (Lee) Bird III (born May 14, 1964, better known as Lee Bird) is an American business executive. Most recently he was the chairman and chief executive officer of the At Home Group and retired in December 2023. He is also known for serving in executive roles at companies such as Nike, Old Navy, and Gap.

== Early life and education ==
Lee Bird was born in Cape Cod, Massachusetts. Bird’s first job was as a dishwasher when he was 14, where he stated he learned the value of a college education.

In 1986, Bird earned a bachelor's degree in finance at Ithaca College where he was also an NCAA All American in swimming. In 1990, Bird earned his MBA at Babson College’s F.W. Olin Graduate School of Business in Massachusetts.

== Career ==
Bird started his professional career as a Loan Officer for BayBank.

Before entering the retail/consumer industry, Bird held various strategic and financial positions for Ford Motor Company, Honeywell/Allied Signal, and Gateway, Inc.

From 2001 to 2003, Bird held the position of chief financial officer for Old Navy before he was promoted to chief operating officer for Gap in 2003. Bird also served as Group President for Nike Affiliates at Nike, Inc., overseeing Nike subsidiaries such as Hurley International before stepping down from his position in 2009.

Bird also served from 2011 to 2012 as managing director and consuming practice leader of The Gores Group, a global private equity firm.

Bird joined Garden Ridge in 2012 as president and chief executive officer. He oversaw the company as it became At Home Group Inc. in 2014. He also oversaw the company as it entered the E-commerce industry.

Bird previously served on the board of trustees at his alma mater, Ithaca College. Bird is also a member of the Ownership Advisory Group for the NHL’s Dallas Stars, the National Advisory Committee for Brigham Young University’s Marriott School of Business, and the board of the Larry H. Miller Company.

== Personal life ==
Bird married Linda Partridge in 1986. They have eight children. In 1991, their third child, Kelsey, passed 13 days after she was born due to complications of a heart defect. In 2018, the Kelsey Partridge Bird Natatorium at Ithaca College was named in her honor.

He has been a member of The Church of Jesus Christ of Latter-Day Saints since the age of 10. His wife, Linda, is also a member and Bird baptized her when she was 21.

In 2009, Bird was diagnosed with a rare form of leukemia and was told his cancer was incurable. He pursued other options and participated in an experimental trial at MD Anderson Cancer Center in Houston, TX. After months of following the protocol and enduring painful side effects, the treatment was successful. Bird is in full remission and cancer-free.

In 2021, Bird began serving as Stake President of The Church of Jesus Christ of Latter-day Saints for the Lewisville Texas Stake.
