= Rinse =

Rinse or rinsing may refer to:

- Rinse, a step in washing
  - Rinse cycle of a washing machine
  - Rinse cycle of a dishwasher
- Rinse, a method of shampoo or hair coloring. See hair care and hair conditioner.
- Rinse (album), a 2003 album by Minotaur Shock
- Rinse (unreleased album), by Vanessa Carlton
- Rinse FM, a London community radio station and an associated record label, Rinse Recordings
- Rinse (company), on-demand laundry company

== See also ==
- Rinse aid
- Mouthwash, or mouth rinse
