= Deliv =

Former American same-day delivery company

Deliv Inc.
- Company type: Private
- Industry: Package delivery
- Founded: 2012; 14 years ago in Menlo Park, California
- Founder: Daphne Carmeli (CEO)
- Defunct: 2020
- Fate: Acquired by Target Corporation
- Headquarters: Menlo Park, California, United States
- Website: deliv.co

Deliv Inc. was an American crowdshipping, same-day delivery startup, based in Menlo Park, California. Deliv provided last mile transportation services. Deliv was founded in 2012 by Daphne Carmeli, who also was CEO of the company, and offered same-day service to mall shoppers.

== Company Details ==
Deliv raised $12.35 million in funding from the four largest mall operators in the U.S., as well as General Catalyst, Redpoint Ventures, Trinity Ventures, Operators Fund and PivotNorth as well as strategic investors including UPS, Google, Enterprise Holdings, and GM. Deliv's drivers were required to undergo an extensive filtering process. In 2017, the company announced an expansion of its service to 33 markets and 1,400 cities, up from 19 markets previously.

In May 2020, Deliv announced Target buys delivery startup Deliv with Carmeli and Deliv team joining the retailer. Target had previously acquired delivery companies Shipt and Grand Junction both in 2017.

== See also ==
- Shipt
- Gig worker
- Roadie (app)
