= Poplin (company) =

On-demand laundry service company

- Type: Private
- Industry: Service industry; Gig economy; Laundry
- Founded: 2018
- Founder: Mort Fertel (CEO); Nachshon Fertel (CTO)
- Headquarters: Lehi, Utah
- Number of locations: 400+
- Key people: Ari Fertel; Mort Fertel; Moshe Fertel; Nachshon Fertel; Shira Fertel
- Services: Laundry services
- Number of independent contractors: 50,000+
- Website: https://poplin.co/

Poplin (formerly SudShare) is an American company which allows people to hire independent contractors to wash, dry, fold, and deliver laundry. SudShare was co-founded in 2018 by Mort and Nachshon Fertel in Baltimore, Maryland, and operates through a mobile app of the same name. The service is available in over 400 American cities.

== History ==
SudShare was developed as a mobile app in 2017 by Nachshon Fertel, one of three teenage triplet siblings in a family of seven. The software was developed while Nachshon Fertel was a high school sophomore student at a yeshiva in Norfolk, Virginia, where he earned science credits for developing the app after school hours. The Fertel family initially washed clients' laundry themselves, then began signing up contractors as demand expanded.

The idea for the business model came from Ari Fertel, the Fertel triplet's mother, who was tired of doing laundry for the entire family. She challenged Nachshon Fertel to create an app that would allow her to outsource the task. According to Ari Fertel, "the kids wouldn’t help with the laundry, but they solved the problem for me with code."

The company was formally launched and co-founded in 2018 in Baltimore, Maryland, with a later expansion in Norfolk and Washington, DC. Mort Fertel, Nachshon Fertel's father, took the role of CEO. Nachshon Fertel currently serves as Chief Technology Officer. His triplet brother, Moshe Fertel, is Chief Operating Officer.

Over the course of 2021, SudShare expanded to cover over 400 cities across America, and according to the company, has over 50,000 independent contractors using the app. The business does not generally cover rural or remote areas, due to increased costs of transportation.

== Operations ==
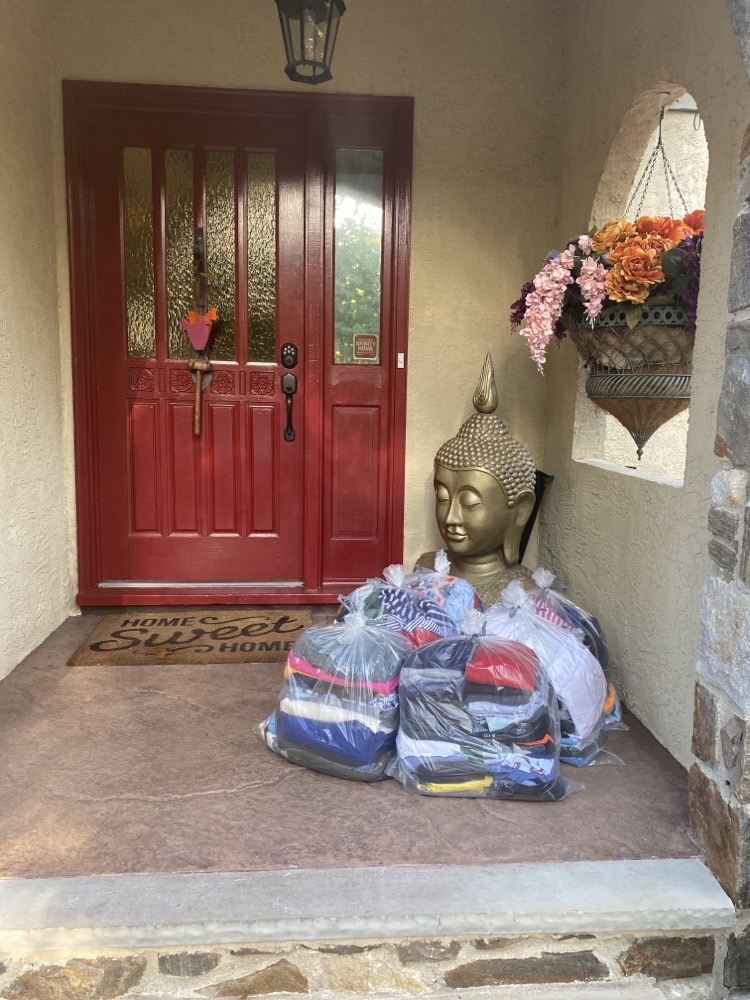
Example of SudShare home delivery, 2021

Poplin operates through a mobile app, with in-app options giving consumers a choice of cleaning methods. Repeat customers can choose who services them.

Poplin is used by independent contractors who pick up, clean, fold, and deliver user's laundry, often using their own washer and dryer, rather than a laundromat's.

The service offers in-app training for new contractors, and allows them to choose which new orders to take on, if any. The app also uses a rating system in which higher-rated contractors get access to more orders. Contractors take a 75% commission for each transaction, plus tips.

== Reception ==
Poplin’s business model has been compared to other platform economy companies such as Uber, which profit through gig workers using the service. According to marketing professor Marie Yeh, of Loyola University Maryland, "There are going to be some consumers who aren’t going to like that idea of people touching your clothes," potentially leading to lowered demand for the service.

The company's use of service workers to outsource laundry has also been compared to the use of dhobis in India, a group of castes in the Indian subcontinent whose traditional occupations are washing and ironing clothes.

Poplin is part of a larger movement of on-demand laundry startups, with competitors such as Tide Cleaners, Rinse, Royal Clean and Hampr, which offer similar competing services.

The internet is riddled with complaints about Poplin due to its inconsistency in laundering services, as well as their policy to charge a $10 per day holding fee if a card is declined or laundry is not able to be delivered on the scheduled date.

== See also ==
- Laundry-folding machine
- List of cleaning companies
- Uberisation
- Washio (company)
