= Andrew Higginson =

Andrew Higginson may refer to:

- Andrew Higginson (snooker player) (born 1977), English snooker player
- Andrew Higginson (businessman) (born 1957), British business executive
