= Marcela Sapone =

American entrepreneur (born 1986)

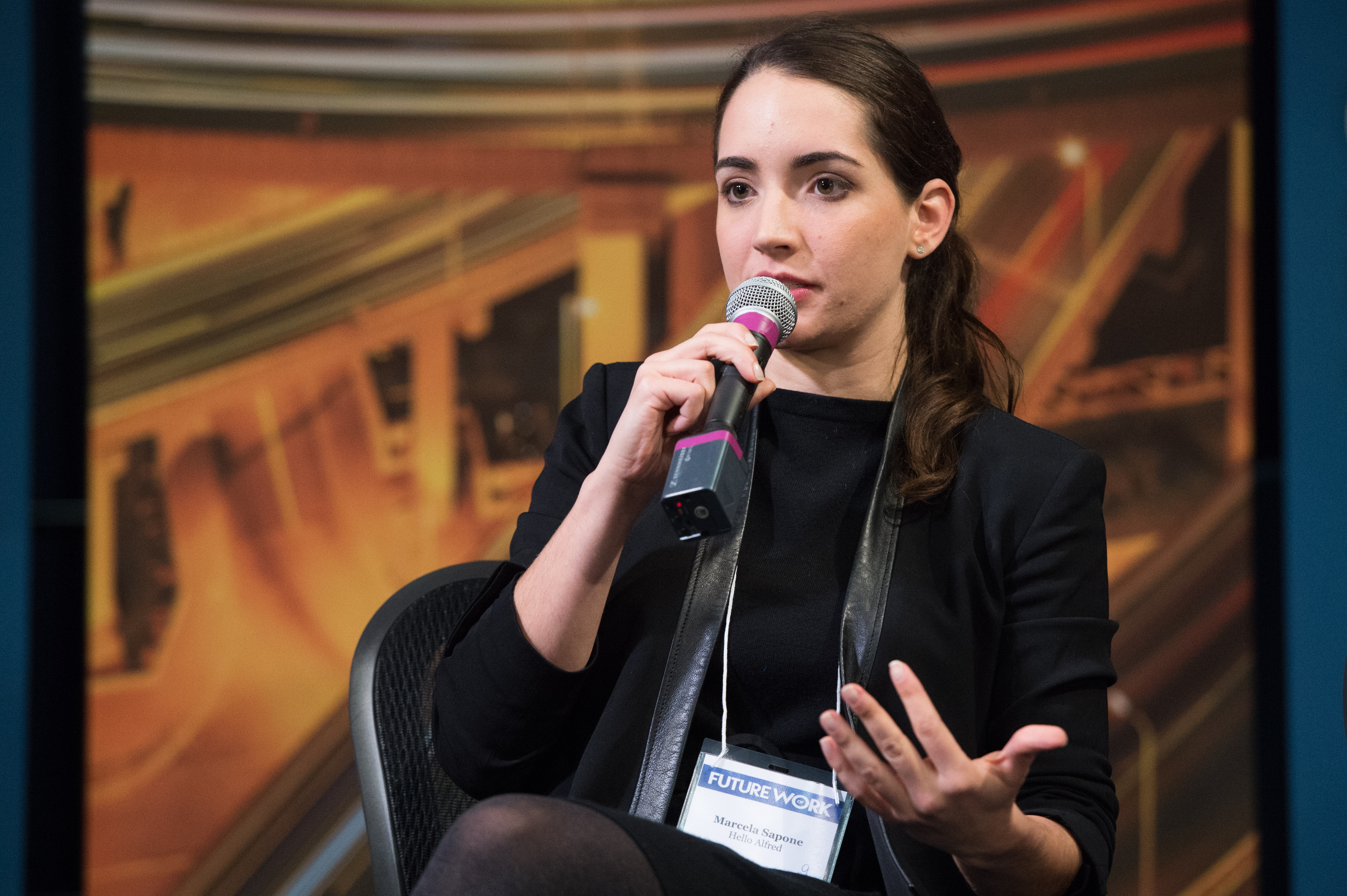
- Born: March 9, 1986 (age 40)
- Education: Boston University; Harvard Business School (MBA)
- Occupations: Entrepreneur, CEO
- Employer: Hello Alfred

Marcela Sapone (born March 9, 1986) is an American entrepreneur. She is the CEO of New York-based startup Hello Alfred, which she co-founded with Jessica Beck in 2014 while in business school.

== Early life and education ==
Sapone earned her undergraduate degree in Business Administration from Boston University in 2008 and graduated with an MBA with distinction from Harvard Business School in 2014.

== Career ==
Prior to founding Hello Alfred, Sapone began her career as a consultant at McKinsey & Company before working in private equity. She has also co-created WHITESPACE, a seed-stage venture fund.

Through Hello Alfred, Sapone has become a advocate for pro-labor policies, and was among the first founders in the sharing economy to write on the importance of meaningful work and a meaningful income for employees. She has worked with the Brookings Institution, the Secretary of Labor and the White House under the Obama administration.

== Recognition ==
Sapone has been recognized for her work and was named one of Goldman Sachs' "most intriguing entrepreneurs," Fast Company's Most Creative People and a winner of TechCrunch Disrupt SF. She was also nominated for the Financial Times' ArcelorMittal Boldness in Business Award, and was the face of Consumer Tech for Forbes 30 Under 30 in 2016.
