= Washio (company) =

Services provider company in US(closed 2016)

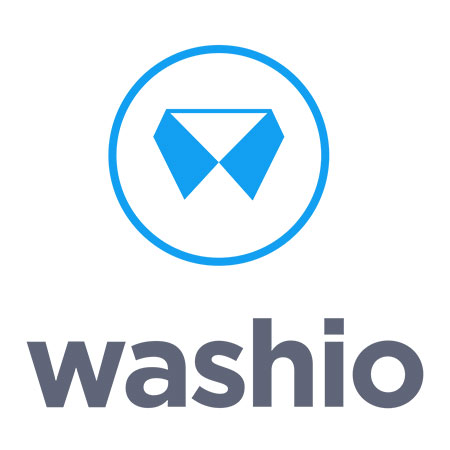
- Industry: Laundry, Service industry
- Founded: 2013; 13 years ago
- Founder: Jordan Metzner, Bob Wall, Juan Dulanto
- Defunct: August 30, 2016
- Fate: Closed; assets purchased by Rinse
- Headquarters: Los Angeles, California, United States

Washio was an American on-demand laundry cleaning and delivery service. The company was founded in 2013 by Jordan Metzner, Bob Wall, and Juan Dulanto, and raised $17 million in funding.

Washio shut down operations on August 30, 2016. Shortly afterward, its assets were purchased by its former competitor, Rinse.

== History ==
Washio was founded in 2013 by Jordan Metzner, Bob Wall, and Juan Dulanto, after noticing what they perceived to be an inefficiency and lack of online presence in the laundry sector. The company, based in Los Angeles, received millions from investors, over multiple funding rounds.

Washio functioned as a middleman service, outsourcing the washing, folding, and dry cleaning to third-party facilities, while hiring so-called "ninjas" to deliver the laundry to and from homes and laundromats. In order to stand out from fast-growing competition (such as Rinse, FlyCleaners, and Laundry Locker), Washio originally included a cookie from a local bakery with each order, but as they grew switched to including a more scalable, healthy food item: a flax crostini.

By the time it closed in 2016, Washio had dry cleaned over one million items of clothing, serviced six major cities across America, and had delivered over 21,000 tons of laundry.

Multiple reasons have been given for Washio's failure, including, among many other possible causes, its low margins, reliance on continued growth, overly-strict pick-up and delivery schedule, lawsuits against its "ninjas" being classified as independent contractors, outsourcing the actual washing and drying to third parties, and lack of company culture inclusion of non public-facing workers.
