= At Home (store) =

American retailer

At Home Stores, LLC.

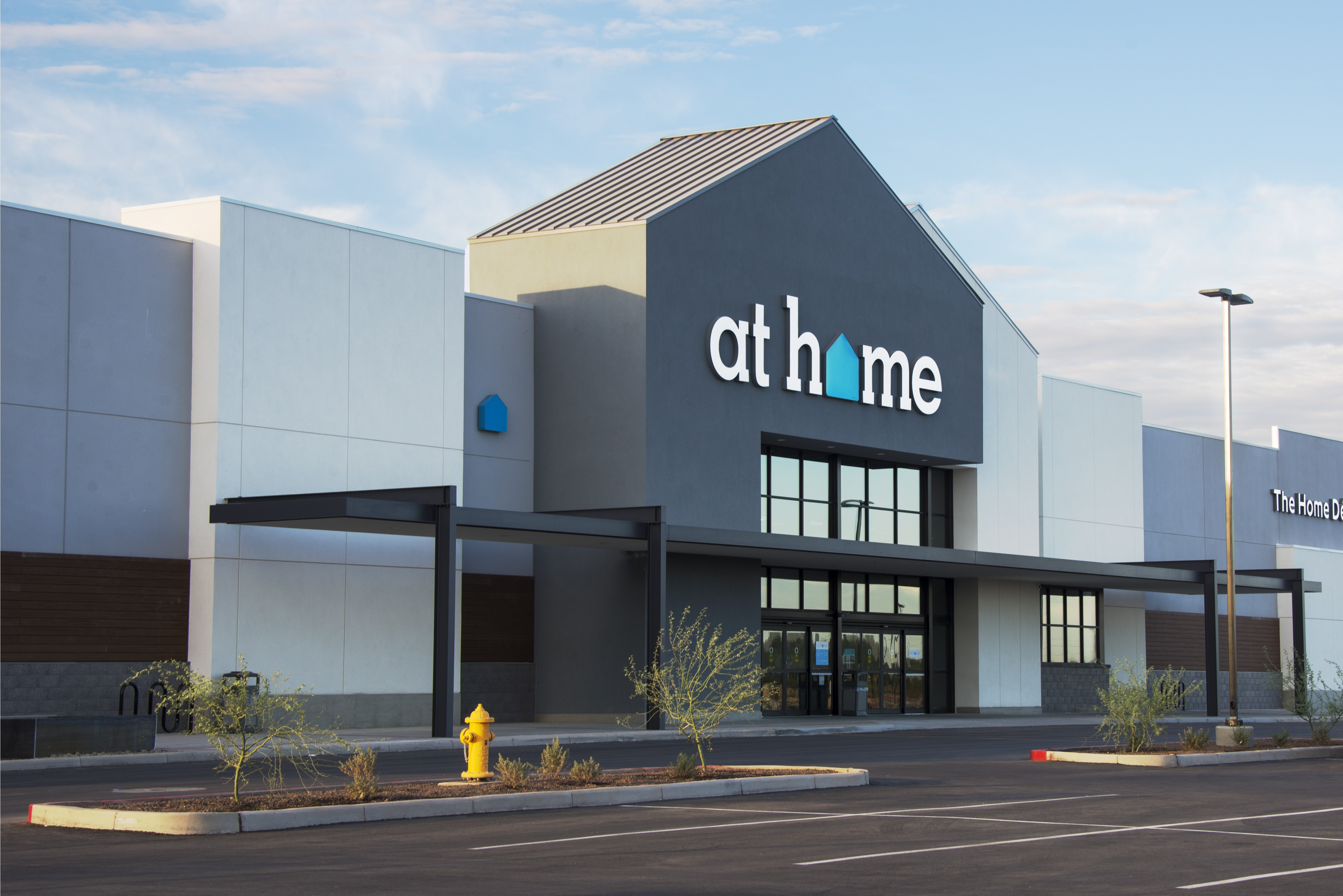
- An At Home store in Gilbert, Arizona
- Formerly: Garden Ridge Pottery and World Imports (1979–2000s); Garden Ridge (2000s-2014)
- Type: Public (1979–2021) (NYSE: HOME); Private (2021–present)
- Industry: Specialty retail
- Founded: 1979; 47 years ago (as Garden Ridge Pottery)
- Founder: Eric White
- Headquarters: Dallas, Texas, United States
- Number of locations: 260 (August 2025)
- Key people: Brad Weston (Chairman & CEO); Jerry Murray (Chief Financial Officer)
- Products: Furniture, Patio and garden, Home textiles, Housewares, Rugs, Seasonal decor, Tabletop decor, wall decor
- Revenue: ▲US$1.737 billion (2021)
- Total assets: ▲US$2,524 million (2021)
- Total equity: ▲US$484 million (2021)
- Owner: Hellman & Friedman
- Number of employees: 10,055 (2022)
- Website: athome.com

At Home Stores LLC is an American big-box retail chain of home furnishing stores. Headquartered in Dallas, Texas, At Home operates 260 stores in 40 states.

The company was founded in 1979 as Garden Ridge Pottery and World Imports, and later shortened to Garden Ridge. In 2014, it became At Home.

== History ==
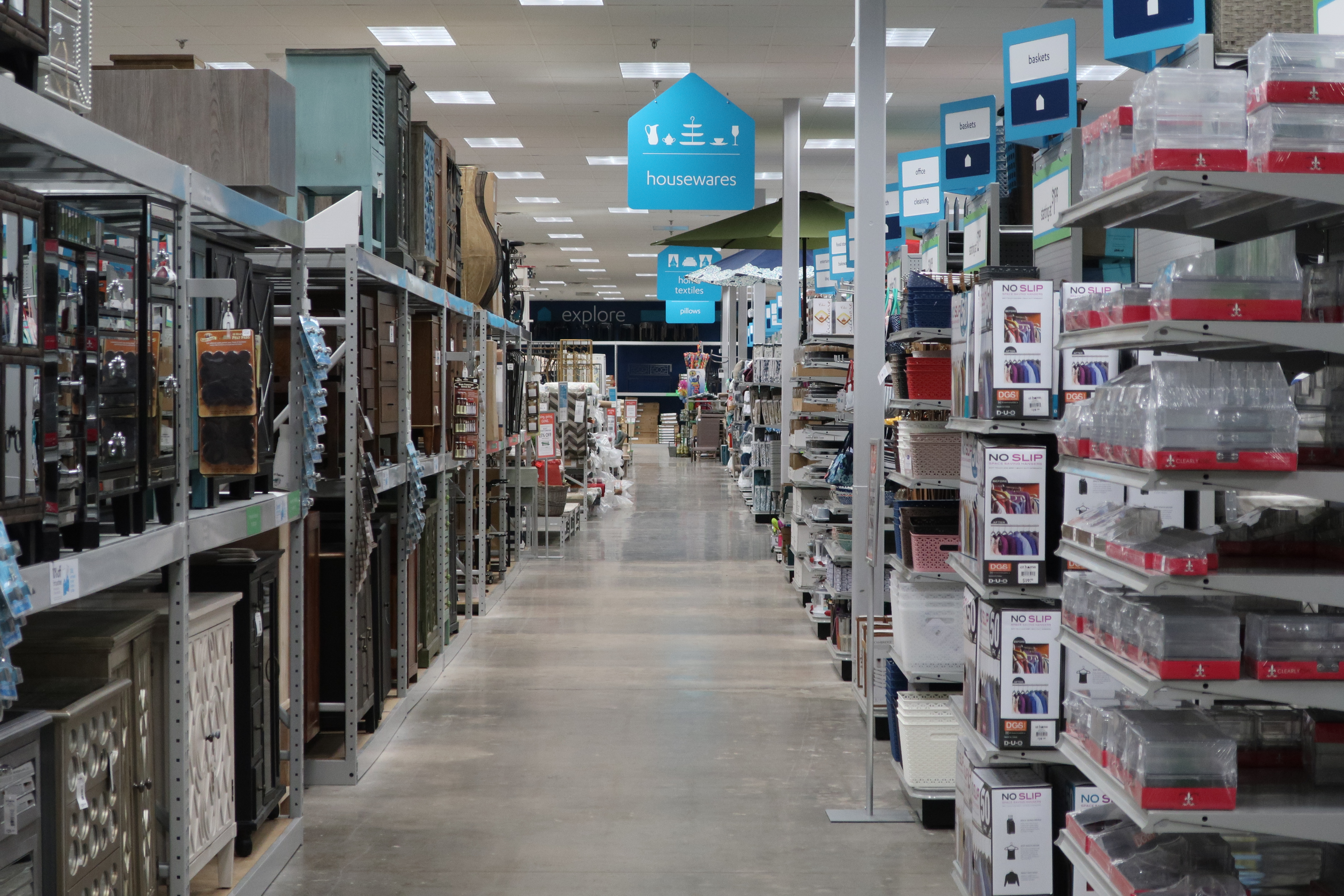
Interior of an At Home in Rapid City, South Dakota. This space was originally a Target

=== Founding as Garden Ridge ===
In 1979, Eric White opened a store called Garden Ridge Pottery and World Imports in Schertz, Texas. In 1985, a second location opened near Yukon, Oklahoma. By April 1986, the company owned three stores and had purchased two Houston shopping malls. In January 1987, the Oklahoma store was sold off and became Cimarron Pottery & World Imports Inc. White sold Garden Ridge to a group of investors in 1988. The chain had annual sales of $50 million at the time.

By 1995, Garden Ridge had expanded to seven stores in Tulsa, Dallas, Houston, San Antonio, Louisville, Memphis, and Oklahoma City. The company held an initial public offering later that year. By November 1999, investment firm Three Cities Research paid $185 million to take the company private again.

Facing increased competition from Wal-Mart and Home Depot, Garden Ridge filed for Chapter 11 bankruptcy protection in February 2004. Garden Ridge emerged from Chapter 11 in 2005, having closed one distribution center and nine stores. The company also renegotiated leases on 30 stores to save about $6 million a year.

Moving forward, Garden Ridge would focus more on interior decorating, including seasonal items, greenery, pottery, framed art, and mirrors. It also cut prices, advertising, and headcount.

The company entered Pennsylvania for the first time in 2008, opening a store in North Fayette in September. By 2008, Garden Ridge was generating $500 million in revenue across 43 stores.

AEA Investors acquired Garden Ridge in October 2011 for $715 million. By this point, the company operated 50 stores, primarily in the South and Midwest, and maintained $388 million in annual sales. After coming aboard as CEO in 2012, Lee Bird found that stores had outdated employee policies, were unorganized and dirty, and had strayed away from selling home goods. In October 2013, Garden Ridge opened a location in Broomfield, Colorado, its first in the state.

=== Rebrand to At Home ===
In 2014, Garden Ridge converted all 71 of its stores to the At Home brand and floorplan. The company replaced its orange branding for soft gray and blue and added a house symbol for the "o" in At Home. The rebranding cost around $20 million. Bird moved the corporate headquarters from Houston to Plano, Texas, where its distribution center is located.

In November 2014, the company expanded into Wisconsin, opening a store in Wauwatosa. It entered Kansas and Utah in 2015. At Home filed for an initial public offering on September 4, 2015. The company officially went public in August 2016. As a public company, At Home engaged in an aggressive expansion effort. The company expanded into Massachusetts and New Jersey for the first time in 2017. In August 2018, the first At Home store in Connecticut opened in Manchester. The company also introduced a branded credit card and it's Insider Perks reward program.

In 2019, the company expanded to the West Coast, opening stores in Puyallup, Washington that January and Lake Forest, California in March. By April 2019, the company has expanded to 188 stores, but its stock had lost 40% of its value over the previous 12 months. As a result, it began looking for a potential buyer. In May, it was reported that Kohl's was in preliminary discussions to buy the retailer. Following a sudden drop in At Home's stock value in June, the company announced plans to slow its expansion efforts and finally offer online shopping.

During the COVID-19 pandemic, At Home experienced rapid growth as consumers focused on improving their living space. By May, it was able to reopen 50% of its stores, while also offering curbside pickup and contactless delivery at many locations, including those that remained closed. Between 2020 and 2021, net sales rose 27.3% and comparative store sales increased 19.4%.

In April 2021, the company expanded into New York City, opening a location in Rego Park, Queens. In May, At Home announced it would be acquired by Hellman & Friedman for $2.8 billion. The transaction was completed in July and the company became privately owned once again. Under new ownership, At Home introduced the Honeybloom, Providence, and Found & Fable private labels, released a mobile app, expanded the rewards program for its branded credit card, and expanded its same-day delivery offerings by partnering with DoorDash and Roadie. It also continued expansion efforts by opening 16 new locations in 2021 and setting up in six new states in the first half of 2022.

The pandemic-era boom proved to be short-lived, and sales in the home goods sector fell off in 2022. As a result of At Home's low sales, S&P Global Ratings lowered its corporate credit rating and issued a negative outlook for the company. Moody’s also lowered its corporate credit rating from B3 to Caa1.

Supply chain issues in 2021 and 2022 saw the company absorb more than $300 million in higher costs, resulting in increased prices for customers. However, in March 2023, At Home announced it was permanently dropping prices on thousands of items after managing to lower its freight costs. The company closed on a $200 million private placement and made several refinancing transactions in May. This allowed At Home more financial flexibility after rivals Tuesday Morning and Bed Bath & Beyond each filed for bankruptcy. In July 2023, the company introduced buy-now-pay-later options through a partnership with Synchrony.

In October 2023, Fitch Ratings reported that At Home was nearing a potential Chapter 11 bankruptcy filing. At the end of the year, Bird retired after 11 years. During his time at the company, he oversaw At Home’s expansion from 58 stores and $364 million of revenue to 268 stores and nearly $2 billion.

On April 10, 2025, At Home warned that it would explore a potential bankruptcy filing, blaming financial challenges caused by Donald Trump's recent tariff spike. On May 29, 2025, At Home warned that it was preparing to file for Chapter 11 bankruptcy within the coming weeks after it missed an interest payment to creditors and entered a forbearance agreement with lenders a week later. The company is also searching for new suppliers as it plans to exit China due to concerns over tariffs.

On June 11, 2025, At Home officially announced that it was set to file for Chapter 11 bankruptcy by June 15, becoming the first major retailer to fall victim to the tariff war. The company plans to close 20 of its 250 locations that are deemed underperforming. On June 16, 2025, At Home filed for Chapter 11 bankruptcy protection, blaming tariffs, rising interest rates and a decline in consumers spending money on home goods. The company plans to eliminate nearly all of its $2 billion debt as it also receives $200 million in funding in order to keep the company operating throughout the bankruptcy proceedings. As part of the filling, At Home indicated it would close 26 underperforming stores by September 30, and warned that additional store closures may occur. Once the proceedings are complete, ownership of At Home will be transferred to hedge funds and investment firms based in New York and San Francisco. On August 1, 2025, additional locations were added to the list of planned store closures. At Home recently exited bankruptcy after closing 31 stores. After filing for Chapter 11 in June 2025, the company's reorganization plan was approved by a Delaware bankruptcy court in October 2025.
