= Joel Sng =

Singaporean former entrepreneur and businessman

- Born: Joel Sng Zhiwei; 1983 (age 42–43); Singapore
- Employer: Honestbee
- Known for: CEO of Honestbee

Joel Sng Zhiwei (born c. 1983) is a Singaporean former entrepreneur and businessman. He co-founded the online grocery and food delivery service Honestbee and was its chief executive officer from March 2015 to May 2019.

== Career ==
In December 2014, Sng founded the startup company Honestbee, an online grocery and food delivery service, together with Jonathan Low and Isaac Tay. He started serving as the company's chief executive officer in March 2015.

In May 2019, Sng was dismissed as CEO. A day before his dismissal, he had reportedly sent an email to all Honestbee staff stating that "I am not an abandon ship person and I will never leave the company to be rudderless."

Following Sng's departure, early Honestbee backer Brian Koo became acting CEO. Sng was also the director of Sun Group Capital, which was founded in 2011 and had S$10 in capital.

== Legal issues ==
In August 2019, Honestbee creditor Benjamin Lim sued Sng for $3.8 million in damages, although the matter was later settled out of court. In March 2020, Honestbee filed a lawsuit against Sng for an "alleged breach of fiduciary duties", including purchasing a house in Japan using company funds and incorporating a sham company called PayNow that Honestbee subsequently bought over.

In June 2021, the High Court of Singapore awarded $5.1 million in damages to South Korean brokerage Mirae Asset Daewoo after Sng allegedly failed to deliver Honestbee shares that they had purchased. On 23 May 2022, Sng was issued a bankruptcy order by the High Court.
