= Care.com =

American services company

Care.com, Inc.
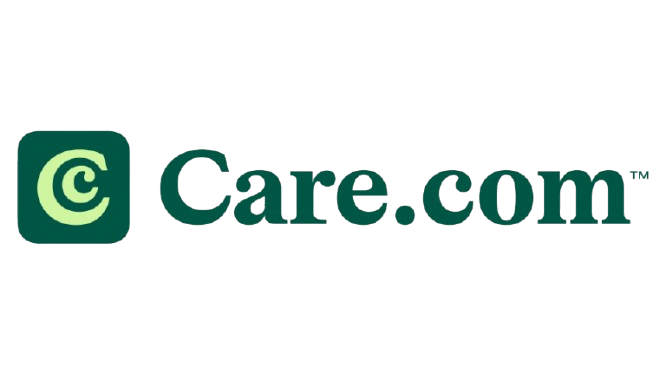
- Company type: Private
- Headquarters: Dallas, Texas, United States
- Area served: United States, Canada, United Kingdom, Western Europe
- Founder: Sheila Lirio Marcelo
- Key people: Brad E. Wilson (CEO)
- Industry: Consumer Internet; Online marketplace
- Services: Child care; Senior care; Tutoring; Housekeeping; Pet care
- Employees: 515
- Parent: People Incorporated (2020–2026)
- Website: www.care.com
- Launched: May 2007; 19 years ago

Care.com is an online marketplace for families to find childcare, senior care, care for those with special needs, care for home, tutoring support and pet care. It is also a two-sided marketplace allowing caregivers to find jobs. Through its enterprise arm, Care for Business, the company provides employers with caregiving benefits for their employees. Enterprise clients include Google, Facebook, Starbucks and BestBuy.

The company is headquartered in Dallas, Texas, with offices in New York, Shelton, and Berlin. The company raised $111 million in venture funding before going public on January 24, 2014. Care.com was bought by IAC in February 2020 and is no longer publicly traded.

As of June 2023, Brad E. Wilson is the CEO of the company.

== History ==
Care.com was started by Sheila Lirio Marcelo, who came up with the idea when she had trouble finding care for her children and aging parents. The platform helps match families to caregivers, including nannies, sitters, senior care providers, pet care providers, tutors and housekeepers. The company provides two kinds of membership, basic and premium and also allows families to book caregivers on demand.

In 2007, Care.com raised $3.5 million in a Series A funding round from Matrix Partners with participation from Reid Hoffman. Media reported allegations that Marcelo had met other companies in order to use their information to start Care.com, but a spokesperson for Matrix denied any claims of unfair treatment.

In 2012, Care.com launched in the United Kingdom and Canada, and acquired Berlin-based Betreut.de, giving it a footprint in more than a dozen Western European countries. In 2013, the Care.com app Karoo received a Webby Award under the social (handheld devices) category. The app was later withdrawn.

In November 2013, Care.com filed for an initial public offering with details of the IPO first revealed a month later.

Prior to its IPO in January 2014, Care.com had raised $111 million in funding from investors including Matrix Partners, Trinity Ventures, New Enterprise Associates, USAA, and Institutional Venture Partners (IVP). In January 2014, the company reportedly planned to raise $85.6 million by offering 5.35 million shares, at $14 to $16 each, on the New York Stock Exchange under the symbol "CRCM". On January 23, 2014, 5.35 million shares were priced at $17. Care.com went public on January 24, 2014, with shares priced at $22.55, up about 30 percent from its initial pricing. It was the first Boston venture-funded technology company to go public in almost two years.

In 2015, The Boston Globe reported about a couple defrauded by a nanny who had cleared the site's screening processes as well as other instances where families in the United States were suing the company for alleged negligence in properly conducting background checks. In March 2019, The Wall Street Journal reported that the site listed day care providers as licensed in their state when they were not. Care.com responded by eliminating unverified childcare listings created automatically but never claimed by the facility owner from the site and strengthening member screening procedures.

In December 2019, holding company IAC announced its intention to acquire Care.com for $500 million, and completed the acquisition on February 11, 2020, at which time Care.com ceased trading on the NYSE. As part of the deal, IAC executive Tim Allen became CEO of Care.com. During the COVID-19 pandemic, the company enabled several states, municipalities and non-profits to help frontline workers in those communities find care for their families.

In August 2024, Care.com reached an agreement with the US Federal Trade Commission to provide $8.5 million in refunds to caregivers whom the company allegedly deceived about the number of jobs available on its platform and their payment rates, as well as to families for whom the company made it difficult to cancel their memberships. However, the company emphasized that the settlement is in no way a validation of the FTC's claims but is meant to keep its focus on helping customers. Care.com also stated that it was prepared to litigate the case for several years if necessary.

In June 2025, Care.com announced a new identity and tools to reflect its shift from primarily providing childcare to offering a broader range of caregiving services, including senior care, pet care, home help, and camp searches.

In March 2026, IAC sold Care.com to an affiliate of Pacific Avenue Capital Partners for $320 million.

== Controversy over the idea ==
Immediately prior to founding Care.com Marcelo was an Entrepreneur in residence at Matrix Partners. While there, she and Matrix partner Nick Beim met with the founders of Sittercity.com and Sitters.com, two existing websites for finding caregivers which had been founded years earlier. The purpose of the meetings were to discuss a potential investment and bringing Marcelo in as CEO. Matrix Partners did not invest in either firm and, months later, Marcelo would found Care.com and receive $3.5 million in Series A funding from Matrix Partners, with Reid Hoffman, co-founder of LinkedIn also participating in that round.

Mike Cravens, founder of Sitters.com, is quoted as saying that the meetings Marcelo and Beim had with him "were more than just a couple of meetings... the reality is that they did a deep dive into my company and then used that information to jump-start Care.com". Cravens furnished the Boston Globe with emails from Marcelo in which tells Craven that she would not entertain starting her own business which would compete with Sitters.com.

== Publications ==
Since 2013, Care.com has released Cost of Care, an annual proprietary research report covering cost of child care trends borne by families in the US per year, along with cost-saving strategies for child care needs.

== Acquisitions ==
Company	Year
Breedlove & Associates	2012
Besser Betreut GmbH.	2012
Parents in a Pinch	2012
Citrus Lane	2014
Town + Country Resources	2018
Galore	2018
Trusted	2018
LifeCare	2020
