= Merlin Kauffman =

Founder of influential technology company

Merlin Kauffman (born July 20, 1985), is an American technology entrepreneur and investor. He is the founder and executive chairman of the on-demand massage app, Soothe, Inc.

== Career ==
Kauffman's career started when he was hired by AOL at the age of 11 and he bootstrapped his first startup at the age of 17.

In May 2013, Kauffman founded Soothe, an on-demand massage therapy service that connects certified massage therapists to consumers in real time via the app or web. The company works with 1,500 independent massage therapists and provides several massage modalities, including Swedish, deep tissue, sports massage, couples massage, and prenatal massage. It also provides in-office chair massage through its corporate wellness program, Soothe At Work. Soothe At Work has had clients such as Facebook, Hulu, and Microsoft. Within two years of launch, Soothe had already expanded to 12 cities and raised $12.7 million. By 2015, Soothe had raised a total of $48 million. Kauffman has invested in numerous early-stage technology companies, including Circa in 2012, Fitspot in 2016, and Digits in 2019.
