= Useme =

Polish fintech company

- Useme logo
- Type: joint-stock company
- Industry: Fintech, Freelance marketplace websites
- Founded: June 28, 2013; 12 years ago in Wrocław, Poland
- Founder: Przemysław Głośny
- Products: website
- Website: useme.com/en/

Useme is a Polish fintech platform for freelancers, acting as an intermediary in the settlement of payments between freelancers and sole proprietors and their clients. It enables international transactions and settlements based on remote work contracts and invoices.

== History ==
Useme was founded on June 28, 2013 in Wrocław by Przemysław Głośny. Initially, it operated as a tool for processing settlements between clients and subcontractors in the IT, graphic design, and copywriting industries. Over time, the platform expanded its activity to other sectors, including social media marketing, 3D graphic design, and architecture. In 2013, it has received 700,000 zlotys of funding (including about 480,000 in a non-refundable grant) from EU funds.

In 2015, the company enabled settlements with foreign clients, and since 2018, following the registration of an affiliated entity in Estonia, it has been handling global settlements.

In 2020, the company generated PLN 50.6 million in revenue (approx. EUR 11.4 million; a 70% increase year-on-year) and a net profit of PLN 1.32 million (approx. EUR 0.3 million). The total value of all transactions settled on the platform (GMV) during this period amounted to PLN 57.8 million (approx. EUR 13.0 million). In the same year, the company introduced batch settlement and bulk payment features for companies working with multiple subcontractors, and the systems were integrated with online payment platforms.

In 2021, a new joint-stock company, Useme SA, was established. Through this new entity, a crowdfunding campaign was launched with a fundraising target of PLN 2.5 million. That same year, the number of registered users on the platform from 50 countries exceeded 100,000.

In 2022, the company’s revenue amounted to PLN 120.9 million (approx. EUR 25.9 million); in 2023, it rose to PLN 193.0 million (approx. EUR 42.7 million); and in 2024, it reached PLN 245.0 million (approx. EUR 57.1 million).

By 2023, over 200,000 registered users had signed up on the platform. According to press reports, by April 2025, the total number of projects processed by the platform since its launch reached over half a million.

== Publications and market research ==
Since 2016, the company has regularly created and published widely available survey reports describing the state of the freelancing and remote work sector in Poland. These publications, sometimes undertaken in cooperation with external research agencies, serve as a source of market statistics, analyses of the professional structure of freelancers, and trends in average rates of remuneration in industries such as copywriting, graphic design, and IT services. Useme’s reports are regularly cited and discussed by Polish industry and business media.

== Awards and distinctions ==
In 2022, Useme was nominated and ranked among the 15 finalists in the “Auler” poll organized by the Aula Polska community.

In 2022, the company’s CEO, Przemysław Głośny, was ranked 8th in the “50 Most Creative People in Business” list published by Brief.pl magazine.
