= Soothe =

Wellness service marketplace and app

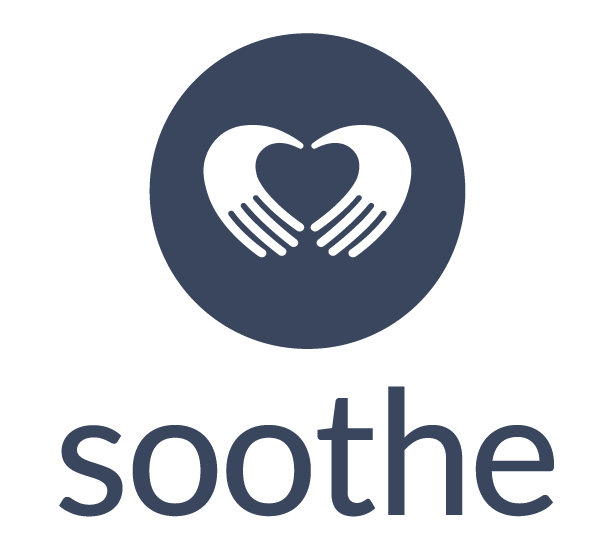
- Type: Private
- Industry: Health
- Founded: August 2013; 13 years ago
- Founder: Merlin Kauffman & Bradley Herman
- Headquarters: Los Angeles, California, United States
- Areas served: US
- Key people: John Ellis (CEO)
- Services: Massage, skincare, beauty
- Website: soothe.com

Soothe is a wellness service marketplace based out of Los Angeles, California. The company allows users to request the services of a massage therapist, cosmetologists, and estheticians. Since its launch in 2014, Soothe has expanded its service area to include many cities and counties in the United States.

== History ==
Soothe was founded in August 2013. It was created by Merlin Kauffman, former CEO & cofounder, and Bradley Herman, former CTO & cofounder. Kauffman developed the idea behind the service while studying at the Harvard Business School. He was a domain-name investor who started as a teenager. As an adult, he invested four hundred thousand of his own money to start the business. The company first began operating in the Los Angeles area where it was based.

As of December 2014, the service had 300 licensed massage therapists in Los Angeles and also covered Austin, Miami, Orange County, Phoenix and San Diego. In August 2015, the company received $10.6 million in funding from The Riverside Company. By this point, the company had expanded to a total of 13 cities which included Chicago, Seattle, and San Francisco. In its March 2016 Series B funding, the company raised an additional $35 million. It had expanded to twenty-two areas in the US, including Atlanta and Indianapolis. Soothe had a total of more than 3,200 massage therapists across the nation. It also operates at a loss and planned to continue to do so “for the foreseeable future”. However, the company reported a monthly revenue of $1.2 million as of March 2016.

As of April 2016, Soothe's coverage area also included such cities as Houston, Minneapolis, Orlando, and Portland. It had also expanded services to Canada by including Vancouver, British Columbia. The company also began servicing in Europe with London becoming the first city across the Atlantic.

In July 2016, the company had signed-up corporate clients like Facebook, Hulu, and Microsoft. According to the company, the move was partly motivated by a desire to smooth-out demand and mitigate the spike in service requests outside of the regular nine to five corporate business hours. By February 2017, the service was available in 51 cities in the US while also adding services to Toronto, Canada. In summer 2017, the company launched two locations in Australia by expanding its services to Sydney and Melbourne.

On May 2, 2018, Soothe raised $31 million in Series C funding from The Riverside Company.

In January 2020, John Ellis was hired as CEO of Soothe. He led the company's restructuring and expansion beyond massage into skincare and beauty services, and continues to manage Soothe's global growth into new markets and services.

In October 2022, Soothe expanded into hospitality staffing services after announcing a partnership with Woodhouse Spas. This move into Hospitality expanded even more in 2023, as Soothe officially announced the launch of its hospitality wellness staffing platform on April 20, 2023. At the time of launch, over 100 properties were already using the platform to make shifts available to independent contractors across the Soothe platform.
