= Shipt =

American delivery service owned by Target Corporation

Shipt, Inc.
- Company type: Subsidiary
- Founded: 2014; 12 years ago
- Headquarters: Birmingham, Alabama, US
- Area served: Many metropolitan areas in the United States
- Founder: Bill Smith
- Key people: Kamau Witherspoon (CEO)
- Industry: Retail
- Revenue: ▲US$1.0 billion (2018)
- Parent: Target Corporation
- Website: www.shipt.com
- Native clients on: iOS, Android, Web

Shipt is an American delivery service owned by Target Corporation. It is headquartered in Birmingham, Alabama.

In December 2017, it was announced that Target Corporation was acquiring Shipt for $550 million and that it would operate as an independent subsidiary following the acquisition. As of 2018, Shipt delivered groceries, home products, and select electronics.

Shipt headquarters in downtown Birmingham, Alabama

== History ==
Shipt was founded and initially funded by Bill Smith. Before launching Shipt, Smith had built other businesses including a cellphone business, a small loan business, and a prepaid Visa card business. The company soft-launched in November 2014 in Birmingham, Alabama with 1,000 pre-enrollment customers and officially launched in Birmingham in May 2015. By 2016, the service was available to 27 metro areas in 9 states. The company initially targeted regions that had no grocery delivery services before expanding into other regions.

In July 2016, Shipt received a $20 million Series A investment led by Greycroft Partners, e.ventures and Harbert Growth Partners. The company said it planned to use the funding to develop partnerships and scale. Shipt raised an additional $40 million in Series B funding in June 2017. The round was led by Greycroft Partners with participation from previous investors. At the time of the investment the company operated in 47 markets across the U.S.

Bill Smith speaking about Shipt's expansion in Birmingham, Alabama, in 2018.

On December 13, 2017, Target announced it would acquire Shipt for $550 million to improve its same-day shipping capabilities. After the acquisition, Shipt continued to form delivery partnerships with retailers other than Target. Following the acquisition, Target said it planned to use Shipt and its infrastructure to facilitate same-day delivery from a majority of its stores and that the service would be available for more than 55,000 products initially and that, by the end of the year, every major category of product would be included. In March 2018, the company announced it was launching same-day delivery from Target stores in Washington D.C., Baltimore, Anchorage, Fairbanks, Juneau and New Orleans, and the New England region the following month with plans to deliver products in 170 markets by year-end.

In March 2019, Shipt named Target veteran Kelly Caruso as its new CEO, succeeding founder Bill Smith, who continued with the company in an advisory role.

In February 2022, Shipt announced that Kamau Witherspoon would join the company as its new CEO, effective March 1, 2022. Witherspoon held leadership roles with various companies including UnitedHealthcare, Yum! Brands, and Target, where he most recently was senior vice president of operations. In that role, he was responsible for the company’s operational planning and prioritization, partner operations, M&A integration, and process improvement initiatives across supply chain, stores and properties. Previously, he was senior vice president, operational performance and readiness at UnitedHealthcare, leading new business integration, M&A integration, operational strategy, and field operations. And he also held the position of chief restaurant excellence officer for the KFC US division of Yum! Brands leading the overall transformation of operations.

== Service ==
Shipt facilitates same-day delivery from various retailers to its members through either a smartphone app, available on iOS and Android platforms, or via their websites.

Having a Shipt membership enables customers to place orders for products from local retailers such as ABC Fine Wine & Spirits, Costco, CVS, Harris Teeter, H-E-B, Jewel Osco, Kroger, Lucky's Market, Meijer, Office Depot, OfficeMax, Publix, Safeway, Shaw's and Star Market, Target, Roche Bros., ShopRite and Winn-Dixie. Customer orders are shopped and delivered by more than 300,000 "Shipt Shoppers" across the country. These shoppers are not employees but self-employed contractors who deliver on behalf of the company. The membership costs $99 per year.

== See also ==
- Amazon Fresh
- GrabFood
- Instacart
- List of gig economy companies
