= The Food Assembly =

The Food Assembly is an online farmers' market that aims to help farmers sell their produce direct to consumers. It was founded in France in 2010 by Guilhem Cheron and Marc-David Choukroun. The Food Assembly was originally called La Ruche qui dit Oui! which means The Hive That Says Yes!

There are branches in France, Belgium, Spain, Germany, Denmark, the Netherlands, UK, Switzerland and Italy. However at the end of June the French organisation pulled the plug on the UK with no reasons given

The project was motivated by the desire for healthy eating and sustainable living. Anyone can open a Food Assembly in their neighbourhood and recruit local farmers to sell produce at through the local food assembly. However, there are restrictions on the geographical area and these need to be agreed by your counties head office even if they are not aware how your members might travel in that area. Customers (colloquially called Members) can place orders through the online platform and then pick up their orders at a local venue from the producers.
