= Expert360 =

Online marketplace

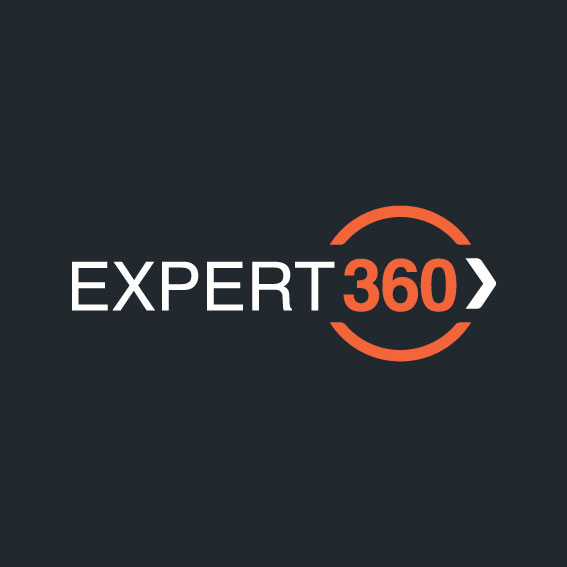
- Established: July 2013
- Founders: Bridget Loudon, Emily Yue
- Type: Private
- Headquarters: Sydney, Australia
- Key people: Bridget Loudon, Emily Yue, Dmitry Alimov, Gary Swart
- Parent organization: Swipejobs
- Website: www.expert360.com

Expert360 is an online marketplace co-founded by Bridget Loudon and Emily Yue and headquartered in Sydney, Australia. Expert360 acts as a digital network for matching independent business consultants with clients (companies, organizations) for short or long-term project work. The company is best known for its innovative approach to both the local and international freelance marketplace.

== Description ==
Expert360's online platform is structured like a standard freelance marketplace as it provides the tools to potential employers to post and manage jobs of interest to independent consultants in the upper tier employment market. Its main consultant base consists of highly qualified workers with experience in senior or executive positions in large corporations or investment firms. The marketplace also has junior representatives from management consulting and investment firms.

Expert360's clients range from small-medium businesses to enterprises such as QSHR, Woolworths and Telstra, as well as consulting and investment firms.

== History ==
Expert360 launched on July 1, 2013. The company's co-founders, Bridget Loudon and Emily Yue, raised $1 million (AUD) from investors in their first funding round at the end of 2013

In 2015, Expert360 closed an oversubscribed capital raising round of $4.1 million (AUD), backed by Russian investment fund Frontier Ventures, Australian technology fund Rampersand and several Australian angel investors. Allan Moss AO is also a notable investor of Expert360. On March 30, 2016, the company announced that it was opening an office in New York City in order to expand its reach in the United States. In September 2026 Expert360 was acquired by Swipejobs, an Australian AI job-matching company.

== See also ==
- Freelance marketplace
- Freelancers Union
- Independent contractor
- Mercenary
- Misclassification of employees as independent contractors
- Recruitment advertising
- Self-employment
