= YourParkingSpace =

British online marketplace for parking spaces

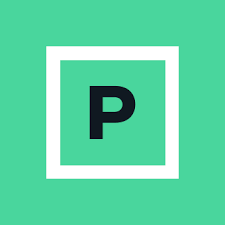
- YourParkingSpace logo
- Company type: Private
- Industry: Transportation & Technology
- Founded: 2006; 20 years ago in London
- Founder: Harrison Woods, Charles Cridland
- Headquarters: Floor 4, YourParkingSpace Ltd, 2 Redman Pl, London E20 1JQ
- Area served: United Kingdom
- Brands: YourParkingSpace
- Website: www.yourparkingspace.co.uk

YourParkingSpace is an online marketplace for drivers looking to find and pre-book parking in the United Kingdom, and as of 2022 began directly operating car parks on behalf of landlords. The website and mobile app feature over 500,000 privately owned and commercially operated parking spaces, which are available to book by the hour, day or month on a subscription basis. As of 2018, YourParkingSpace served over 50 cities across the country. The company is headquartered in Stratford, London.

== History ==
=== Early beginnings ===
YourParkingSpace was founded by Charles Cridland in London in 2006 as a free platform connecting driveway owners with motorists searching for affordable parking. Joined by co-founder Harrison Woods in November 2013, the business was relaunched, and a limited company formed. Woods had recently sold Primal Parking, a similar online service which secured a £60,000 investment from Theo Paphitis and Peter Jones on a 2012 episode of Dragons’ Den. In 2013, the company moved to Level39, Canary Wharf, London

In June 2014, YourParkingSpace moved into Level39, One Canada Square in Canary Wharf, London.

In January 2015, YourParkingSpace took its first £1 in revenue and claimed that by the end of 2016 they would be making more than £5.8 million for landlords.

In January 2015, YourParkingSpace also partnered with Parkhound, an Australian parking marketplace. Operating in separate geographic markets, the partnership focused on the sharing of knowledge, insights and technology to accelerate each company's growth.

=== Growth and Expansion ===
In November 2016, Town Centre Securities PLC invested £1.9m in return for a 10% stake in YourParkingSpace. Over the following 3 months, the company expanded from 8 to 15 full-time employees. In December 2017, Town Centre Securities PLC took up the option to increase their stake to 15%.

In 2018, YourParkingSpace grew in size grow in size to 28 full-time employees.

In September 2018, YourParkingSpace appointed Andrew Higginson as non-executive chairman. In addition to his role as chairman of Wm Morrisons Supermarkets plc, Higginson has served as Group Finance Director of Laura Ashley Holdings plc and The Burton Group plc., and spent 15 years as the Executive Director of Tesco plc, 11 years as Finance and Strategy director and 4 years as CEO of their Retail Services Division (Tesco.com, Tesco Bank, Tesco Telecoms and DunnHumby).

In September 2020, YourParkingSpace secured a £5million investment from Pelican Capital.

In 2022, the company was acquired by Flowbird in a deal worth over £120,000,000.

In January 2023, Brannan Coady, formally the organisations Chief Operating Officer, took over as CEO to lead the next phase of the organisations growth and expansion. As of 1st Jan 2024 the organisation has grown to over 150 employees and surpassed 1 million monthly bookings.

== Awards ==
YourParkingSpace has won awards for industry awards.

Year	Award	Category	Result
2021	British Data Award	Marketing Campaign of the Year	Finalist
2021	UK Dev Awards	App of the Year	Finalist
2022	British Parking Awards	Car Park Design Award	Winner
2022	SME UK Enterprise Awards	Best Car Park Space Booking Platform - London	Winner
2023	British Parking Awards	Best New Car Park	Finalist
