= Pager (company) =

- Type: Private
- Industry: Healthcare
- Headquarters: New York City
- Key people: Walter Jin, Gaspard de Dreuzy, Philip Eytan, Oscar Salazar
- Website: pager.com

Pager, Inc. is a virtual care platform that offers a variety of services to guide patients and health plan members through the healthcare journey. Pager offers virtual nurse chat and triage, appointment scheduling with assistance from care coordinators, telemedicine, aftercare follow-up, and more while implementing artificial intelligence on its platform.

== History ==
Pager was founded by a group of entrepreneurs who had previously worked on technology startups. Formerly known as techCare, Inc., the company changed its name to Pager in 2014. Pager is headquartered in New York City.

To help patients navigate the non-emergency healthcare experience using a mobile device, Pager co-founders Gaspard de Dreuzy, Philip Eytan, and Oscar Salazar (former Uber CTO), designed and developed the Pager app. The company officially launched Pager on May 1, 2014. Pager's online medical care management services are currently available across the United States and in numerous Latin America countries.

In 2015, Pager's virtual doctor services and medical information management app switched from being primarily out-of-pocket for customers, to a supported network model that worked with insurance plans.

Pager expanded its offerings in 2016 to include virtual nurse chat services between patients and nursing staff to help determine the recommended course of care. That same year, the company left its San Francisco offices to grow the Pager user base in the New York City market.

In January 2017, Gaspard de Dreuzy stepped down from his role as CEO. Pager's executive board chairman, Walter Jin, moved into the position. Next, de Dreuzy shifted into the role of President, while co-founder Philip Eytan took on the role of Chief Strategy Officer. Today, Eytan serves as a member of the board of directors at Pager.

It was announced in February 2017 that Pager would incorporate development company PokitDok’s healthcare price comparison tool into the healthcare navigation platform. The addition of this tool enabled the Pager app to accept insurance from more patients.

Pager entered into a new engagement with Horizon Healthcare Services in September 2017. The company began delivering the Pager app to Horizon customers in January 2018.

In January 2020, Pager expanded its services from eight states to serve all 50 states when it opened a command center in Raleigh, North Carolina staffed with nurses that serve patients via chat, video, or voice.

In February 2020, Pager expanded internationally when it partnered with Seguros SURA Colombia, a Colombian health insurance provider. Seguros SURA Colombia is a subsidiary of Grupo Sura.

Pager secured a $33 million round of financing in March 2020. The funding was led by Health Catalyst Capital.

In March 2021, the company announced its new merchandised solutions, which include Pager Guide, Pager Navigate, Pager Care, Pager Advocate and Pager 360. The five solutions address specific challenges for health plans and healthcare providers.

== Services ==
The Pager platform gives users access to services from nurses, care coordinators, and physicians. Services include in-person appointment scheduling with a physician or specialist, chat with a nurse for triage, and on-demand virtual telemedicine visits with a physician. Practitioners can use the Pager platform to communicate and collaborate with each other.

== Company news ==
In 2017, Pager Chairman and CEO Walter Jin was named one of 50+ innovation leaders by MedCity News and AARP. The list was tallied from more than 5000 MedCityNews readers to showcase individuals who are modernizing patient care in order to meet the needs of a mobile world.

In 2019, Pager won a Webby Award, in which the company was honored as “Best Messaging/Bots in Apps, Mobile, and Voice for its “Pager: The Digital Front Door To A Connected Care Experience” platform.

In 2020, Pager Chairman and CEO Walter Jin was selected by Crain's New York Business as a "2020 Notable in Healthcare" - a recognition for innovation in healthcare during the COVID-19 pandemic. The same year, Jin was also recognized in the City & State NY 200 Responsible 100. The list recognizes leaders in the private sector who are actively seeking to help New Yorkers and make New York a better place.

== Executive leadership ==
The executive leadership team from Pager includes the following individuals:

- Walter Jin, Chairman & CEO
- Gaspard de Dreuzy, co-founder, President
- Matthew Kempler, CFO
