= Crowdshipping =

Method of shipping freight

Crowdshipping, sometimes referred to as crowd logistics, applies the concept of crowdsourcing to the personalized delivery of freight. Crowdshipping can be conceived as an example of people using social networking to behave collaboratively and share services and assets for the greater good of the community, as well as for their own personal benefit.

== Definitions ==
The United States Postal Service describes crowdshipping as a "new class of logistics, known as crowdshipping or crowdsourced delivery [that] doesn't require processing facilities or fleets of trucks, and can be scaled quickly and cheaply".

== History ==
=== 2000s ===
The principle of peer delivery was first applied by a few online ventures in the early 2000s. In 2009, ordinary car drivers could register as "couriers" using the site Stuff2Send.com, and had an option to connect with the sender and arrange a fee in case their journeys coincided with parcel deliveries. In the years after the Great Recession, startups including Zipments, mmMule, PiggyBee, Deliv, and Friendshippr were created based on the market's need to earn extra income.

=== 2010s ===
The 2014 publication Issue in Focus by the United States Postal Service Office of Inspector General raises concerns over the new innovation of crowdshipping in the brief titled "Using the 'Crowd' to Deliver Packages". In this publication, the Office of the Inspector General describes crowdshipping as "a subset of the larger 'crowdsourcing' movement [which] involves the use of technology to marshal a large group of people to accomplish something".

The same year, a collaboration between CIRREALT Interuniversity Research Center, Université Laval, and Canada Research Chair in Interconnected Business Engineering created a research paper titled Crowdsourcing Delivery: New interconnected business models to reinvent delivery, which was presented during the 1st International Physical Internet Conference. The research paper quotes Jeremy Rifkin's The Zero Marginal Cost Society, saying: "Crowdsourced delivery is an answer to the growing expectations of customers for faster, more personalized and cost-efficient delivery service. It exploits technological potential (geolocalization, mobile apps) and the social trend of sharing and collaboration." The report continues: "For two years, crowdsourced delivery has been bursting. Several start-ups have been launched and some have attracted millions in investment. Currently leading is Postmates and Deliv that have respectively acquired investments totaling more than 22 and 14 million US$."

In 2016, The Owls Foundation published its annual Breakthrough from Innovation to Impact, Volume 1. The document covers the relevant topics of that year, including global logistics, with crowdshipping being one of the main sub-topics. Written by Alan McKinnon, professor of logistics at Kuehne Logistics University, the publication calls crowdshipping "its corollary in personal travel: encouraging passengers to use their spare carrying capacity on cars, bikes, buses and planes to carry parcels for other people." It further states that crowdshipping "has had an innocent start with a few cheerful websites, but it does raise serious questions about liability and security".

In 2017, the Journal of Business Logistics published a research paper titled The Rise of Crowd Logistics: A New Way to Co‐Create Logistics Value, authored by Valentina Carbone, professor of supply chain and operations management at ESCP Europe; Aurélien Rouquet, professor of logistics and supply-chain management at NEOMA Business School & CRET-LOG; and Christine Roussat, assistant professor at Blaise Pascal University & CRET-LOG. The paper states: "Bearing in mind the dearth of research on this topic, our purpose is to develop an initial conceptual approach to these initiatives, that we term 'crowd logistics', meant as 'initiatives that tap into the logistical resources of the crowd to perform logistics services.' This article is structured in six sections. The first section reviews the (scarce) literature that relates to crowd logistics. The second section presents our methodology, which is based on the study of 57 cases of emergent crowd logistics initiatives. The third section highlights the main differences between crowd logistics and traditional business logistics."

== Subsets ==
Crowdshipping "can be grouped into four types depending on the nature of the logistics service they propose: crowd storage, crowd local delivery, crowd freight shipping, and crowd freight forwarding".

=== Crowd storage ===
Crowd resources are mobilized through a web search engine that enables clients to geolocate storage spaces uploaded by the crowd. Most offerings are in large cities, where high real estate prices push traditional business storage space to the outskirts.

=== Crowd local delivery ===
The provision of local delivery services relies on transport resources that the crowd has access to and makes use of, including individual logistics capabilities such as picking up goods, driving, and delivering. Transport resources can be vans, cars, scooters, bicycles, public transport, or even walking. Initiatives in this field operate using mobile applications, which enable peers to place delivery requests that are then fulfilled by other peers. Examples include Jojo, Deliv, and Zipments.

=== Crowd freight shipping ===
In crowd freight shipping, the connections between drivers and users of the service are established through the same type of Internet platforms or mobile apps. This type of shipping system seems particularly suitable for oversized or non-standard items that cannot be sent by post because their unusual volume makes the use of standard services impractical or too expensive. Cargomatic is an example.

=== Crowd freight forwarding ===
Crowd freight forwarding initiatives operate using search engines that match clients' requests to travelers' offers with the same origin and destination. Potential users of the service can place ads that inform the crowd of their own shipping needs, while peers post their forthcoming travel itineraries. These initiatives are deployed around the world and may have global coverage, although most of them are specialized in some connections. Examples of this are Sherpals and Grabr.

There is also a less common subset of community-based platforms that link international buyers and local forwarders, allowing buyers to use the forwarder's address as the purchaser's destination. The forwarder can then re-send the goods to the buyer. Examples include Parcl.com and Shippn.
