= AskforTask =

Freelance marketplace

- Type: Private
- Industry: Home services
- Founded: 2012 in Toronto, Ontario, Canada
- Founders: Muneeb M. Mushtaq; Nabeel Mushtaq
- Headquarters: Toronto
- Area served: 100+ cities in Canada
- Brands: AskForTask App (Native clients on: iOS, Android)
- Number of employees: 50+
- Website: www.askfortask.com

AskforTask is a Toronto-based marketplace where people can outsource tasks like cleaning, handyman, and moving. Similar to Uber but for home services, the service is accessible on Android, iOS, and online. It seems like AskForTask iOS app was removed on Nov 17, 2025 from the Apple App Store. AskforTask.com no longer works implying they have shutdown entirely.

== History ==
AskforTask was founded in 2013 by two Toronto based brothers; Muneeb M. Mushtaq and Nabeel Mushtaq. The brothers formed the idea after they struggled to find a reliable plumber. The company was launched when they saw a business opportunity to solve this problem.

Initially, the platform allowed users to post tasks and set their own pricing. It later transitioned to a system with standardized hourly rates. The service uses an algorithm to match users with task providers..

=== Scope ===
AskforTask is used in more than 100 cities across Canada, and has about 20,000 Taskers completing jobs. The company has enabled their clients to save around $100 million on day to day tasks including electrical work, plumbing, cleaning etc.

In 2014, AskforTask received $500,000 in seed funding and announced a dedicated app for its marketplace. By this time the site had received above 50,000 users and processed more than $2.5 million in tasks. The company has also been noted to be the country's largest task based marketplace.

The company has been noted for its success in multiple media sources including being featured in Metabridge Top 15 and Canada's hottest startups.

=== Business model and impact ===
AskforTask's source of income comes from a 15% fee that they take from the Tasker's total earnings on each task. The company runs on a marketplace platform where it connects Askers and Taskers and enables transactions without owning any service providers itself. Unlike traditional service companies (plumbers, movers, cleaners etc.), AskforTask scales by increasing the number of Askers who need help with tasks, and the Taskers who have the skills to provide the needed services. In addition to individuals using the service, businesses have also taken advantage of the platform. They utilize it as an easy access to a large workforce to request a team of Taskers to complete tasks like office clean-outs.

== Operations ==
The AskforTask app acts as the company's online marketplace that matches its users (Askers) with service providers (Taskers) such as handymen, cleaners, and movers in the area to carry out jobs. The system allows workers to pick up jobs that fit their schedule while providing their clients with quick and reliable access to low-cost services.

The review system of the Taskers app is similar to a freelance marketplace in that it enables clients to rate Taskers depending on the quality of their service and enables the Taskers to gain and build up a reputation.

=== AskForTask Taskers ===
The app has increased the availability of employment opportunities for Taskers looking for jobs. Some of the Taskers are students who are looking for part-time jobs to earn extra cash as they would by babysitting for neighbors.

As the platform gained popularity, the Taskers earned themselves real-world reputations. The Taskers on the platform have been featured in media for events such as Canadian Boxing Day.

=== Requirements for becoming a Tasker ===
The requirements for becoming a Tasker include two years of previous experience in the task category, verification and a training process. The company verifies Taskers email addresses, social media accounts, phone numbers and their PayPal accounts when they sign up so that the clients (Askers) are able to trust them while hiring. The company is revamping its website and app to allow for the option to be a "certified" Tasker by implementing online training, government background checks and a video interview.
