= California Burrito Co. =

Fast food chain

- Company type: Private
- Industry: Fast food
- Founded: 2006; 20 years ago (Buenos Aires, Argentina)
- Founder: Jordan Metzner, Sam Nadler and Chris Burns
- Headquarters: Buenos Aires, Argentina
- Products: Burritos, tacos, nachos
- Number of employees: 70
- Website: cbcburrito.com

California Burrito Co. is a fast food restaurant chain that specializes in burritos. It was started by Jordan Metzner, Sam Nadler and Chris Burns in 2006 in Buenos Aires. There are now 4 stores in Buenos Aires, 12 stores in Colombia, 1 store in Santiago, Chile, 1 in Cordoba, Argentina, and 1 in Cuenca, Ecuador.

== History ==
Metzner and Nadler attended Indiana University, graduating in 2005. Both studied business at the Kelley School of Business. After college, Metzner and Nadler moved to Buenos Aires. They found a downtown location and began construction.

In April 2006, the first California Burrito Co. (CBC) opened, and in 2008, new partners came on to help CBC expand. In April 2009, CBC opened its second location in Palermo Soho. In June 2009, CBC opened its third store in DOT Baires Shopping, but it was closed in September 2012.

In October 2009, CBC opened its first store in Medellín, Colombia, in Centro Comercial Oviedo.

In November 2009, CBC opened its first store in Cordoba, Argentina, in Patio Olmos Mall.

In December 2009, CBC opened in Belgrano, Buenos Aires, on the corner of Cabildo and Juramento.

In March 2011, CBC opened in Montevideo, Uruguay.

== See also ==
California Burrito India
