= Toptal =

Global freelance employment marketplace

Toptal, LLC
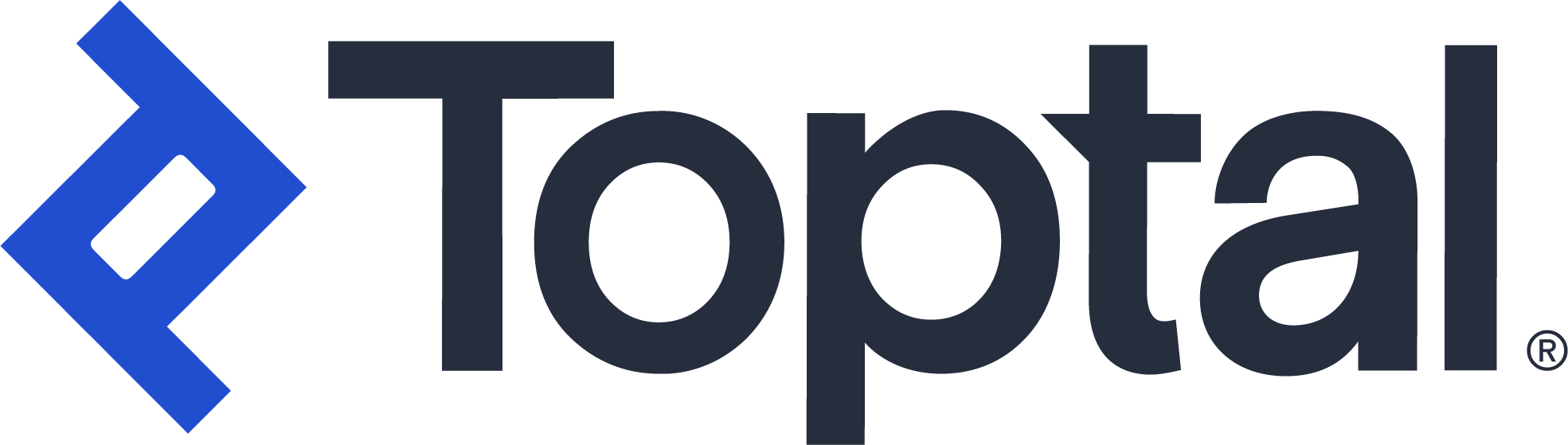
- Type: Private
- Industry: Freelance
- Founded: 2010; 16 years ago
- Founders: Taso Du Val; Breanden Beneschott
- Headquarters: United States
- Area served: Worldwide
- Key people: Taso Du Val (CEO)
- Website: www.toptal.com

Toptal is a global remote company that provides a freelancing platform, connecting businesses with software engineers, designers, finance experts, product managers, and project managers. The company has no headquarters.

== History ==
Taso Du Val and Breanden Beneschott founded the company in 2010. Du Val was previously an engineer at Fotolog and Slide.com while Beneschott was an undergraduate at Princeton University. The name stands for "top talent", and it was started as a virtual company with no dedicated offices.

Toptal had more than $1 million in revenue when Beneschott graduated from Princeton. The co-founders moved to Budapest, Hungary to access software developers with fewer employment options than in the United States.

== Talent search and growth ==
The firm developed personality, language, and skills testing to remotely screen engineering candidates, and accepted the top 3% of several thousand monthly applicants.

The firm matches business engagements with developers from its network and brokers the terms of each job. In 2015, it expanded to include freelance design. In 2016, it acquired the freelancer platform, Skillbridge, which offered freelance accountants, statisticians, and consultants in market research, financial modeling, and due diligence. In 2017, the company launched a vertical specializing in software engineers and designers for the automotive industry. It also launched a vertical for blockchain engineers in February 2018.

== Funding ==
Toptal accepted a $1.4 million seed round of financing from Andreessen Horowitz and angel investors including Quora founder Adam D'Angelo. The company is said not to have raised additional funds since its seed round because it has been profitable. By 2021, Toptal had an annual revenue of more than $200 million and an estimated valuation of up to $3.6 billion.
