= Quiqup =

Quiqup Ltd.
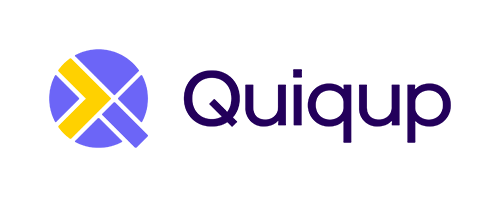
- Type: Private
- Industry: Logistics, last mile transportation
- Founded: September 2014
- Founder: Tim Linssen, Danny Hawkins, Federico Ferraro, Bassel El Koussa and Rami Idriss
- Headquarters: Dubai, United Arab Emirates
- Services: Logistics services, same day delivery, on demand delivery, courier services
- Website: quiqup.com

Quiqup (pronounced quick-up) is a Dubai-based logistics company that provides last-mile e-commerce delivery services throughout the UAE. As of June 2022, the company had over 100 employees across the globe, and over 200 drivers in its fleet in the UAE.

The company currently operates in the United Arab Emirates. In 2022, it announced plans to expand internationally to other countries in the MENATP region.

Quiqup offers multiple q-commerce services to its clients, as fast as 2 hours and as far as all UAE emirates in 24 hours. They serve e-commerce clients of all sizes, from emerging brands like The Giving Movement to large enterprises such as Alshaya and Chalhoub Group.

== History ==
Quiqup was launched in September 2014 by five founders, Tim Linssen, Danny Hawkins, Federico Ferraro, Bassel El Koussa and Rami Idriss. The business began with a consumer facing model, with mobile and web apps where consumers searched and placed orders. Since 2016, logistics services to retailers is also provided.

In June 2017, British retailer Tesco announced it had partnered with Quiqup to offer a one-hour delivery service called "Tesco Now".

In 2019, Quiqup moved its headquarters to the United Arab Emirates, transitioning to B2B deliveries. Since then the company has grown in the E-commerce space until a clear transition in August 2022, to focus purely on the growing Q-commerce space in the MENATP region.

=== Funding ===
In September 2015, Quiqup received an undisclosed amount of funding from a Series A round, led by food ordering service Delivery Hero and Global Founders Capital, an investment arm of the German technology firm Rocket Internet. In May 2017, it raising £20 million in a Series B round led by JOBI Capital and Transmed, as well as existing investors. In May 2019, it has raised another £10m for Middle East expansion.
