= Catalant =

American business-to-business software company

- Formerly: HourlyNerd
- Type: private
- Industry: Consulting
- Founded: February 2013; 13 years ago (as HourlyNerd); Boston, Massachusetts, U.S.
- Founder: Rob Biederman; Peter Maglathlin; Joe Miller; Patrick Petitti
- Website: catalant.com

Catalant Technologies, Inc., formerly HourlyNerd, is a consulting solution that uses a machine-learning algorithm to recommend independent consultants whose skills and expertise are needed for client projects. More than 70,000 independent consultants are listed on Catalant. Catalant is based in Boston, MA.

== History ==

The company, styled as "HourlyNerd", was launched in 2013 as part of a Harvard Business School's course. HourlyNerd was founded by Rob Biederman, Patrick Petitti, Peter Maglathlin, and Joe Miller. In September 2013, HourlyNerd received $750,000 in seed money from a group led by Mark Cuban, and quickly became a global online marketplace that connected companies of varying sizes with over 25,000 independent business consultants for project-based work. By 2016, the company's online marketplace included 17,500 freelance consultants and over two hundred boutique consulting firms.

== Business model ==
The Catalant platform enables clients to post projects, receive bids, interview and select experts, track projects, and make payments all in the same place. Clients use Catalant's software platform to access and deploy people in different talent pools who will work both inside and outside of their organizations. These talent pools include: employees, alumni and retirees, and independent consultants and firms. More than 70,000 independent experts and 1,500 boutique firms are listed in Catalant's "Expert Marketplace."

== Company details ==
Catalant is headquartered in Boston. The company opened its second office in London in 2018. As of 2018, Catalant served more than 30% of the Fortune 100 and 20% of the Fortune 1000, including GE, Pfizer, Staples, and Shell.
