= PeoplePerHour =

UK online platform

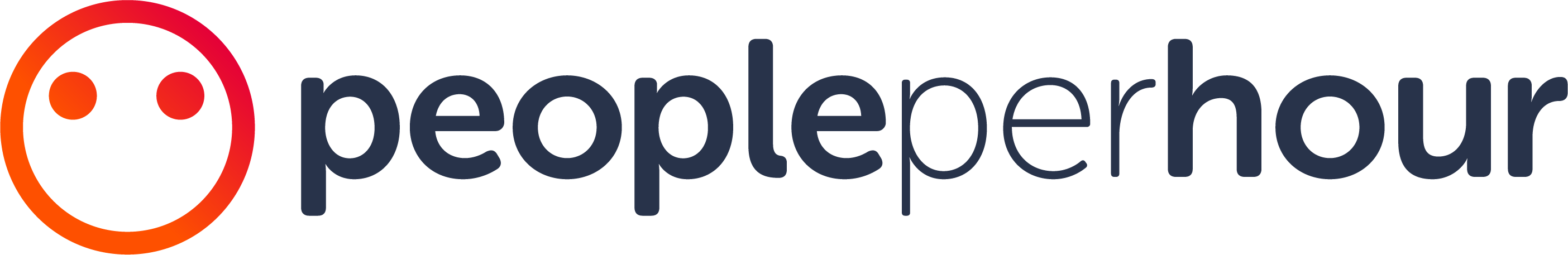
- Type: Private
- Industry: Internet; Freelance marketplace
- Founded: 2007; 19 years ago in London, United Kingdom
- Founders: Xenios Thrasyvoulou; Simos Kitiris
- Headquarters: London, United Kingdom
- Area served: Worldwide
- Key people: Xenios Thrasyvoulou (CEO); Simos Kitiris (CTO)
- Products: PeoplePerHour platform Hourlies
- Services: Freelance marketplace Project management tools Escrow payments
- Website: peopleperhour.com

People Per Hour Limited is a British online freelance marketplace that connects businesses with freelance professionals for project-based and hourly work. It is headquartered in London and has an additional office in Athens, Greece.

== History ==
PeoplePerHour was founded in 2007 by Xenios Thrasyvoulou and Simos Kitiris, both University of Cambridge engineering graduates, as an online marketplace connecting small businesses and startups with freelance professionals. The platform was initially launched in beta in 2007. Following its launch in 2008, the company reported a freelancer community of approximately 40,000 users.

In February 2010, Index Ventures led an interim funding round in PeoplePerHour on equal terms with existing shareholders, joining angel investors including Michael van Swaaij, the former chairman of Skype and founder of eBay's European operations. Prior to this round, the company had raised approximately £425,000 in seed funding from its founders and angel investors. In July 2012, PeoplePerHour launched Hourlies, a feature allowing freelancers to offer pre-packaged services at fixed prices starting from one hour of work, departing from the traditional request for proposal bidding model used by competitors.

In August 2012, PeoplePerHour was named by Wired UK as one of "Europe's 100 Hottest Startups of 2012". In October 2012, the company secured a £2 million (US$3.2 million) Series A investment led by Index Ventures, with participation from Michael van Swaaij and Klaus Nyengaard, the chief executive of Just Eat. Coinciding with the funding round, the company released its first iPhone application and appointed David Engel, formerly finance director at Skype and Yahoo! Europe, as chief financial officer. Also, in 2012, the company relocated its engineering department to Athens.
