= Xiaozhu =

Chinese real estate company

- Industry: Real estate
- Founded: May 1, 2012; 13 years ago in Beijing, China
- Founder: Kelvin Chen Chi
- Headquarters: Beijing, China
- Area served: China
- Website: www.xiaozhu.com

Xiaozhu (Chinese: 小猪) is a consumer-to-consumer short-term home and apartment rental platform based in Beijing, China. The company was founded by Kelvin Chen Chi, a doctor from Chengdu, in 2012.

As of 2018, Xiaozhu had an approximately 21.6% market share among Chinese short-term rental platforms. Its main competitors within China are Tujia and Airbnb.

In October 2018, Xiaozhu closed a $300 million funding round led by Yunfeng Capital. A tech unicorn, the company has an estimated valuation of more than one billion dollars.
