= Hello Alfred =

Residential property management software

Alfred
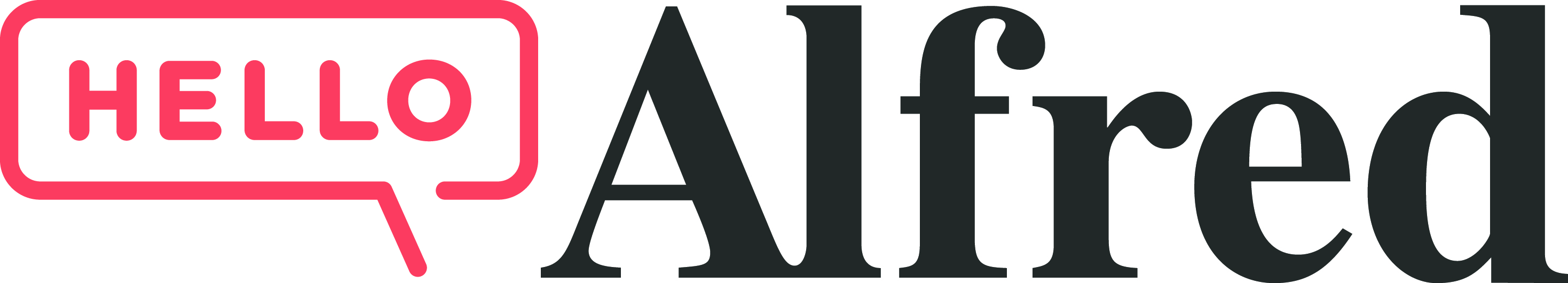

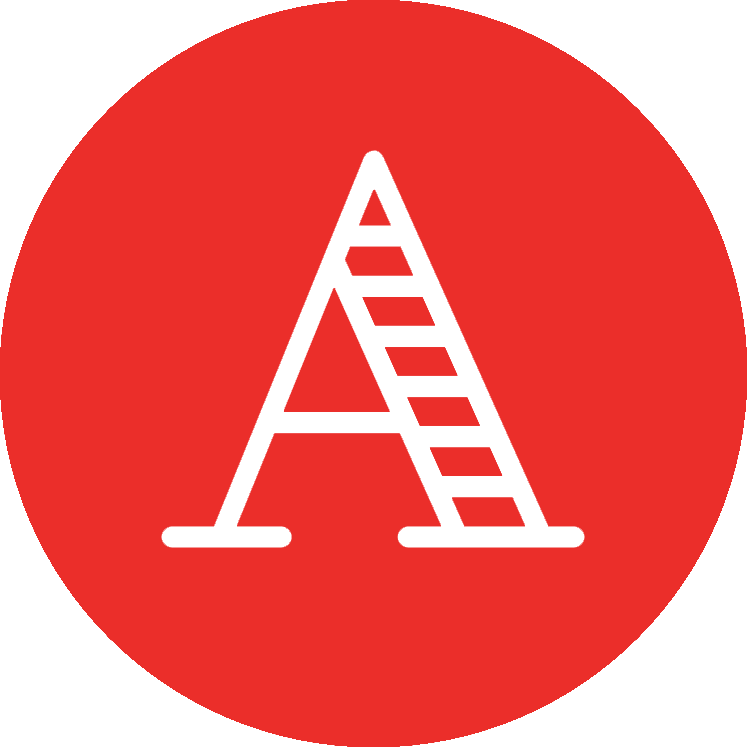
- Company type: Private
- Industry: Real Estate Technology
- Founded: 2014
- Headquarters: New York City, United States
- Number of locations: Over 20 cities including, Boston, Denver, New York City, San Francisco, Jersey City, Los Angeles, Chicago, Washington D.C., Stamford, Connecticut
- Key people: Marcela Sapone & Jess Beck
- Services: Resident Management Software and In-Person Solutions
- Website: helloalfred.com

Alfred, also known as Hello Alfred, is a resident management software application that enables real estate developers and property managers to provide in-home services and experiences to their residents. Residents in Alfred buildings are assigned a personal home manager, or Alfreds, who are W-2 company employees, and can make requests in the company's app. The Alfred platform integrates with Real Page, Yardi and Entrata so that building management teams can operate their buildings through a single platform.

The company has publicly raised $56.5 million in funding and operates in over 20 cities.

== History ==
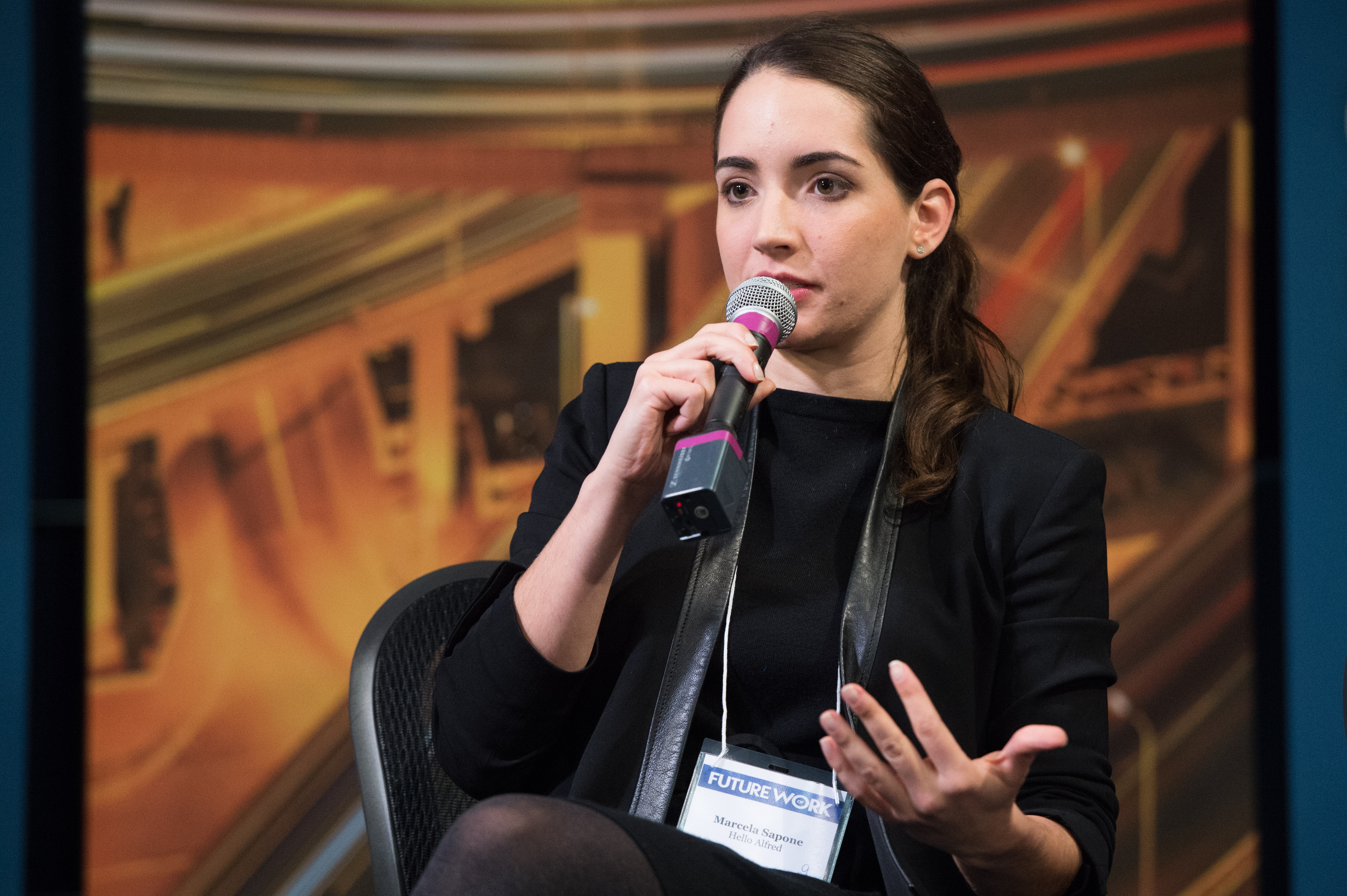
Marcela Sapone, CEO & Co-Founder, 2015

Alfred was founded in March 2014 by Jess Beck, a Williams College graduate, and Marcela Sapone, a Boston University graduate. They were both former McKinsey & Company employees. The two were attending Harvard Business School at the time, along with founding team member Christian Bjelland V.

The co-founders first developed the service for their personal use as a way to find more time. They began to develop it commercially after neighbors began asking for it themselves.

In April 2014, the company won the Harvard Business School New Venture Competition. In September 2014, the company proceeded to win TechCrunch Disrupt SF.

In November 2014, the company raised a $2 million seed funding round with investments from Spark Capital, SV Angel, and Crunchfund. After its seed round the company launched in New York and moved its headquarters there, while continuing its Boston operations. In April 2015 Hello Alfred raised a $10.5 million Series A with investments from New Enterprise Associates, Spark Capital, Sherpa Ventures, and CrunchFund.

In May 2015, the company purchased key assets from New York based on-demand company WunWun.

Alfred works with real estate developers and property managers to offer its "in-home commerce" platform to residents as an amenity. In 2017, Hello Alfred signed deals with The Related Companies and several other firms.

In July 2019, the company acquired Bixby, a building management technology platform.

In October 2020, the company raised a $42 million investment round led by Adam Neumann's family office, 166 2nd LLC.

== Reception ==
=== Worker classification ===
The company has received attention for hiring its Alfreds as W-2 employees and offering a starting hourly wage of $16. It has made statements in the debate about worker classification in the sharing economy. Alfred classifies its workers as W2 employees instead of 1099 independent contractors and therefore offers benefits and healthcare. The company was highlighted in a New York Times op-ed for its decision to treat its labor force as employees.

=== Awards ===
Alfred won TechCrunch Disrupt SF in 2014. The company was recently selected as one of Fast Company's Top 50 Most Innovative Companies in the World.

=== Other ===
Alfred is considered one of the first companies in the On Demand Economy 2.0, and is also seen as commodifying home management services.
