= Cargomatic =

Californian logistics company

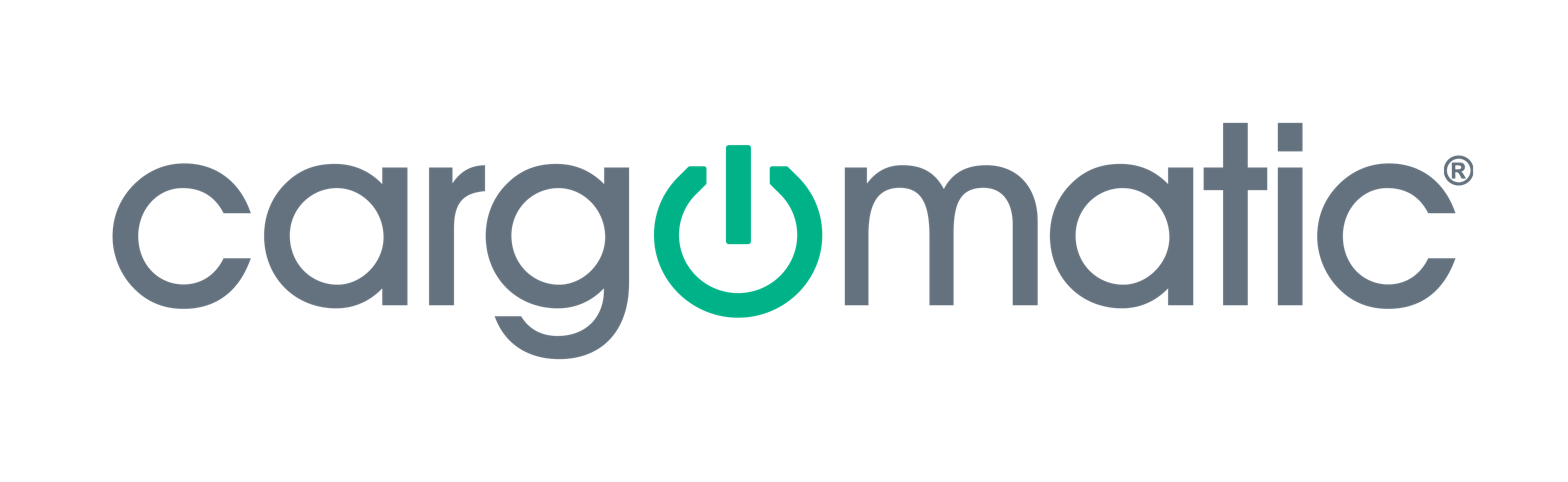
- Industry: Trucking software, Logistics
- Founded: 2013; 13 years ago
- Headquarters: Long Beach, California
- Key people: Richard Gerstein (CEO); Steve Jackson (Chief Administrative Officer); Weston LaBar (Head of Strategy); Matt Hogan (Chief of Staff); Michael Neller (EVP, Sales); Sunil Sharma (Chief Product and Technology Officer); Laura Lucas (Chief People Officer); John Curtis (Chief Financial Officer)
- Website: cargomatic.com

Cargomatic is a logistics company founded in 2013 by Brett Parker & Jonathan Kessler, based in Long Beach, California specifically targeting the fragmented short-haul and drayage trucking markets connecting shippers and carriers real-time with its crowdshipping web platform and mobile app.

== Focus ==
The company focuses on assisting shippers and carriers in the trucking industry through the following segments:

- Capacity utilization – Maximizing carrier truck capacity to reduce empty runs.
- Gig economy – Allowing truckers to do additional jobs, or owner operators to be their own bosses.
- Drayage – Minimizing wait times to relieve congestion at ports such as the Port of Los Angeles and Port of Long Beach.
- Less than truckload shipping – Assisting shippers without fleets, or shipper fleets that are at or over capacity by adding supplemental drivers.

== History ==
Cargomatic was founded in 2013 by Brett Parker and Jonathan Kessler. Its early Southern California service matched local shippers with carriers that had available capacity through a website and mobile app.

In January 2015, Cargomatic began a Free Flow pilot at the Port of Los Angeles's West Basin Container Terminal. Working with the terminal, Ports America, drayage companies and cargo owners including Perry Ellis, Williams-Sonoma and Michaels, the pilot used Cargomatic's system to coordinate container pickups. The company aimed to increase the number of containers moved through the port. After testing its service in the New York area earlier in 2015, Cargomatic formally launched there in August, followed by a San Francisco Bay Area launch in December.

In 2016, at the close of Series A funding, Cargomatic raised a total of $20.8M from investors including Morado Ventures, Canaan Partners, Sherpa Capital, and SV Angel.

In 2018, Cargomatic raised $35M in its Series B funding from Warburg Pincus, Canaan Partners and Genesee & Wyoming.
