= UpCounsel =

Online marketplace for legal services

- Type: Private company
- Industry: Legal technology, Internet
- Founded: August 2012; 14 years ago
- Headquarters: San Francisco, California
- Products: Attorney Services, Legal Forms, Legal Planning and Local Attorney Listings
- Owner: Enduring Ventures
- Website: www.upcounsel.com/

UpCounsel is an online marketplace for legal services created to enable users, primarily entrepreneurs and businesses, to find and hire attorneys. The company is based in San Francisco, California. Initially, UpCounsel provided service to users in California and New York.

On February 3, 2020, UpCounsel announced that it would shut down on March 4, 2020, as required by a licensing agreement with LinkedIn. However, later in February, UpCounsel announced that it would continue operations under a new owner and management. Enduring Ventures announced that it had purchased UpCounsel.

== History ==
UpCounsel was founded in August 2012 by Matt Faustman and Mason Blake, to give startups and other small businesses access to legal help. Faustman, who was UpCounsel's chief executive officer (CEO), had previously worked at Latham & Watkins for almost two years. Blake, who was UpCounsel's chief technical officer, is an engineer. UpCounsel is based in San Francisco. It went through the AngelPad startup incubator.

UpCounsel initially raised $1.5 million in seed funding led by Homebrew; other participants included Bobby Yazdani, SV Angel, Collaborative Fund, Haroon Mokhtarzada, and other angel investors. In December 2014, the company secured $2.4 million in a seed funding round headed by Metamorphic Ventures and Crosslink Capital, in which Homebrew also participated. Until its second round of seed funding, UpCounsel was largely conducting business in California and New York. It planned to use the funding to offer its services in other states. Initially, UpCounsel catered to the technology industry, but it expanded in 2014 to other sectors such as biotechnology, real estate, retail, food service, and entertainment.

In July 2015, UpCounsel raised $10 million in a Series A round led by Menlo Ventures; investors Homebrew and Metamorphic Ventures also participated. Faustman said that by mid-2015, UpCounsel had 10,000 lawyers register but UpCounsel did not accept all and 300 lawyers were providing services on its platform. UpCounsel was not profitable at the time of the funding round.

In September 2016, the State Bar of California mailed private admonitory letters to attorneys who were offering their services on UpCounsel. The letters said that the bar had started investigations into possible "improper sharing of legal fees" when the attorneys let UpCounsel secure "a percentage-based processing fee", and that the investigation would end but could reopen if there were "complaints or other information demonstrating possible misconduct". On May 2, 2018, Raj Abhyanker and LegalForce RAPC Worldwide P.C., the law firm he founded, filed a lawsuit against UpCounsel in the United States District Court for the Northern District of California. They alleged that UpCounsel flouted ethics requirements and unfair competition statutes to have a competitive advantage over law firms, and that it "brazenly ignored" ethics requirements that prevented attorneys from giving attorney's fees to non-attorneys. The lawsuit also included attorneys who participated in UpCounsel's marketplace as defendants. LegalForce filed a modified complaint with the court in September 2018. It asserted that UpCounsel engaged in false advertising that said its attorneys had high quality customer ratings, and advertised through 5,450 reviews so its intellectual property lawyers in Cotati, California, would receive a 5.0 consumer rating. The lawsuit noted though that Cotati had 7,455 residents and 21 lawyers, none of whom offered their services on UpCounsel. LegalForce alleged that there were many other examples of potential customers who were deceived by UpCounsel in different cities in thousands of pages.

In response, UpCounsel said, "LegalForce and ... Abhyanker have made a habit of abusing the courts in this district to compensate for their professional shortcomings. Rather than compete in a fair and open market, they attempt to use litigation to squeeze and bully companies that have succeeded where LegalForce failed." In January 2019, Judge Yvonne Gonzalez Rogers permitted the majority of the false advertising and unfair competition assertions to proceed. She rejected the unfair competition claim that asserted UpCounsel breached lawyers' ethics rules about sharing fees with non-attorneys and dismissed the false advertising claim where UpCounsel said it was "the world's largest law firm"; other false advertising assertions in the lawsuit were allowed to proceed, such as UpCounsel stating in search engine results that it had the "Top 5" and "10 Best" lawyers in various specialities and locations. The lawsuit settled in March 2019. As part of the settlement, Abhyanker received UpCounsel stock.

By 2019, UpCounsel had 25,000 lawyers registered to provide services and 18,000 companies that had purchased its legal services. The lawyers charged clients between $70 and $250 hourly. Customers can use UpCounsel without charge, while lawyers pay a cut of their fee to UpCounsel. UpCounsel's cut of the fee charged to companies is between 12% and 40%. According to The Australian Financial Review, companies that provide related services to UpCounsel include LawyerMatch, Lawtrades, Priori Legal, and Lawdingo. Fortune compared UpCounsel to Rocket Lawyer and LegalZoom.

On February 3, 2020, Faustman and Blake emailed their users to notify them that they would close the website on March 4. UpCounsel signed a license contract with LinkedIn to give its content and information about its customers and attorneys to LinkedIn. About 88% of UpCounsel's shareholders voted in favor of the agreement. Abhyanker, who previously sued UpCounsel and received a settlement of UpCounsel stock, disagreed with the shut down of the company and expressed his intent multiple times to purchase its assets, but was not given the opportunity. He filed a temporary restraining order against its dissolution, which was denied by a judge. In mid-February, UpCounsel's co-founders announced that although they and their employees had moved to LinkedIn, UpCounsel would no longer be shut down as a buyer had been found. UpCounsel would be managed by a new team. Holding company Enduring Ventures announced that it had purchased UpCounsel. UpCounsel's new management team included Enduring Ventures co-founders Xavier Helgesen as acting CEO and Sieva Kozinsky as chief financial officer. Kozinsky had been a previous UpCounsel user through his college tutoring startup. After Kozinsky read the email he had been sent regarding UpCounsel's closure, he and Helgesen contacted UpCounsel to ask if they could buy it, and an agreement was reached for the purchase.

== Services ==
UpCounsel started an online marketplace of lawyers that companies can view and seek for services. The site selects three or four lawyers that fit a business owner's needs and budget. The lawyers provide tailored proposals and bids; the business can choose one of the bids. This allows businesses to secure legal assistance from independent lawyers instead of needing to sign a contract with a large law firm. UpCounsel determines what a business needs and then secures a lawyer who has the skills. It gives lawyers and businesses access to a safe online service that lets them exchange information. UpCounsel takes care of the payments aspect of the relationship between businesses and lawyers. A significant number of the attorneys on UpCounsel come from a BigLaw background who find that UpCounsel gives them autonomy and more work–life balance. Lawyers who participate on the platform include those, for example, who desire to work reduced hours during parenthood, finding a law firm, or had lost their previous jobs. The lawyers must have malpractice insurance. Its website has a social networking component that allows attorneys to ask questions of each other. The company aims to reduce prices for customers but maintain the compensation for attorneys by removing the overhead paid to law firm partners and administrative expenses.

Companies that employ UpCounsel's services include startups seeking assistance with trademarking their names and medium-sized companies requiring legal advice for writing government or employment agreements. It also offered help to technology employees who needed legal advice for their stock options.

From the company's founding, it worked on obtaining for startups brief assignments of legal assistance. In 2014, it started a new program to connect startups with outside general counsels. UpCounsel receives information from companies about their requirements and selects lawyers who are experienced in legal practice in the company's sector to be its outside general counsel. UpCounsel manages the administrative work such as billing and procurement of paralegal services.

== Reception ==
In 2013, writer Jeff John Roberts said of UpCounsel, "My initial impression was that this is a recipe to hire Lionel Hutz". In 2015, he wrote in Fortune magazine that UpCounsel was an example of "the gig economy['s] mov[ing] upmarket". Patrick May of The Mercury News cited UpCounsel as an example of an Uber copycat, writing, "the flattery goes on, with the Uber craze even spawning hybrids. Take UpCounsel, which calls itself 'a cross between Uber and eHarmony — the on-demand marketplace matching lawyers and small businesses to curated legal counsel.'"
