= HopSkipDrive =

American vehicle for hire company

- HopSkipDrive logo
- Company type: Privately held company
- Industry: Vehicle for hire
- Founded: May 2015; 9 years ago
- Founder: Joanna McFarland; Carolyn Yashari Becher; Janelle McGlothin
- Headquarters: Los Angeles
- Area served: Los Angeles; San Francisco Bay Area; San Diego; Sacramento; Seattle; Spokane; Phoenix; Las Vegas; Denver; Dallas-Ft. Worth; Houston; Austin; Midland, TX; Detroit; Milwaukee; Madison; Indianapolis; Philadelphia; Tampa; Brevard County; DMV
- Key people: Joanna McFarland, CEO
- Website: www.hopskipdrive.com

HopSkipDrive is a ridesharing company that provides service to children and older adults. It has operations in 13 states in the United States. It is mostly aimed at school aged children who have IEPs, those that fall under the McKinney–Vento Homeless Assistance Act or are in foster care, who are legally restricted to use other vehicle for hire services. It is often used as a supplement to traditional school buses.

The service can be accessed by school districts via the Ride IQ platform and by parents via a mobile app. The service employs mostly female drivers who have at least five years of experience in childcare.

== History ==
In 2013, Joanna McFarland and Janelle McGlothlin met at a children's party where the idea about "hiring moms and babysitters to drive kids around" originated. Later, they teamed up with Carolyn Yashari Becher, a former real estate lawyer, and founded the company.

The service launched in May 2015.

In January 2016, the company raised $10.2 million in a Series A round.

In August 2018, the service launched in San Diego.

In March 2019, the service launched in Washington, D.C.

In August 2021, the company raised $25 million in a Series C round.

In September 2022, it was announced the company raised $37 million in a Series D round.

== Safety Report ==
Each year, the company publishes a Safety Report highlighting their safety data and the safety investments made to the platform. In the fourth Safety Report for 2022, they highlighted 16.5 million miles driven across 22 markets and 11 states (and Washington D.C.).
