= Roadie (app) =

American crowdsourced delivery platform

Roadie, Inc.
- Company type: Subsidiary
- Industry: Logistics
- Founded: 2014; 11 years ago
- Founder: Marc Gorlin (CEO)
- Headquarters: Atlanta, Georgia
- Area served: United States
- Key people: Dennis Moon (COO); James Delmerico (CTO)
- Services: Gig delivery
- Parent: United Parcel Service
- Website: roadie.com

Roadie Inc. is an American package delivery company for business and private same-day, urgent and scheduled delivery in the United States. The company was founded in 2014 and launched its web and mobile apps in January 2015. As of September 2021, it reported having over 200,000 drivers covering more than 20,000 zip codes.

Roadie states it matches gig drivers with deliveries that are directed along the routes they plan to travel. Major customers include The Home Depot, Walmart, Tractor Supply Company, Best Buy and Delta Air Lines.

In September 2021, UPS entered into an agreement to acquire Roadie for an undisclosed amount with the transaction expected to be closed in the fourth quarter.

== History ==
Roadie was founded by Marc Gorlin, a co-founder of Kabbage and founder of VerticalOne and Pretty Good Privacy, as a same-day and urgent delivery company in 2014.

In January 2015, Roadie launched the first consumer to consumer (C2C) version of its app with a Series A funding round of $10 million. In February, Roadie announced a partnership with Waffle House to designate its restaurants "Roadie Roadhouses", offering a neutral meeting place for drivers and senders. Drivers receive free food and drink through the partnership. In May, late-night host Jimmy Kimmel discussed the Roadie-Waffle House relationship in an opening monologue on Jimmy Kimmel Live!. Roadie's driver network expanded significantly as a result. Roadie closed a Series B round of funding in June, raising $15 million, and its first business to business (B2B) app version launched that November.

In 2015, Delta Air Lines signed an agreement with Roadie to deliver mishandled luggage, becoming Roadie’s first enterprise customer. Roadie launched a pilot program with Delta at Daytona Beach International Airport. Since then, the relationship has expanded to include over 70 airports around the United States and a first mile/last mile line haul relationship with Delta Cargo.

In 2017, the company signed a deal with The Home Depot, also based in Atlanta, and in February 2019, closed a Series C round of funding. In October 2019, Roadie and Delta Cargo announced a partnership to create a same-day cross-country delivery offering, DASH Door-to-Door, the first of its kind from a U.S. passenger airline. Tractor Supply Company became the first general merchandise retailer to offer same-day delivery from every store in April 2020 through Roadie.

In September 2021, UPS entered an agreement to acquire Roadie for an undisclosed amount. The transaction was expected to close in the fourth quarter of 2021. Roadies, which at the time reported having 200,000 operators serving over 20,000 ZIP Codes, was expected to continue operations under its name as a separate company with no transfer of packages between the UPS and Roadies networks. The relationship between the companies goes back several years with UPS being an early investor. Earlier in 2021, UPS had begun a pilot program testing same-day deliveries via Roadies.

== Operations ==
=== On-the-way model ===
Roadie’s app works by connecting drivers with senders, businesses or consumers who have items that need to be delivered. Deliveries within the app are referred to as "Gigs", which Gorlin said was inspired by live music road crews, also known as roadies.

A sender creates a Gig on Roadie's web app or via its API. Drivers then review deliveries in their area on their mobile app and may choose to offer to take on individual or groups of deliveries along the same route. Gigs are then assigned to drivers by Roadie's algorithm. According to the company, this model encourages drivers to choose Gigs that align with their planned schedules and routes. Roadie calls this its "on-the-way" delivery model.

The go-to-market approach taken by Roadie also differs from its competitors. Rather than launching in major cities and sequentially adding new markets city-by-city, Roadie launched nationwide from its inception. The company relies on retail and airline partners to drive volume of deliveries in individual markets, which in turn builds up a network of drivers in those areas, making it easier for small businesses and consumers to send deliveries as well. This strategy allows Roadie to reach smaller cities and towns in rural or exurban communities, traditionally difficult markets for delivery providers to serve.

=== Service lines ===
Roadie’s platform is most popular for same-day, on-demand or scheduled first mile/last mile delivery, especially delivery from stores and warehouses. Some retailers also use it for returns and reverse logistics, moving inventory, and hot shot shipping. Roadie operates 1-hour grocery delivery for Walmart, and delivers perishable food items for others including small, independent retailers. The on-the-way model complements the grocery industry’s just in time model, making last-mile deliveries that do not break the cold chain.

=== Cross-country same-day delivery ===
In October 2019, Roadie and Delta Cargo launched DASH Door-to-Door, a 24/7 door-to-door pick-up and delivery service. Roadie handles the first and last mile and Delta manages the line haul via passenger flights. The service launched originally from Atlanta to 55 cities and is an industry-first for a US commercial airline.

=== Promotion, awards and corporate citizenship ===
In September 2015, Roadie announced a partnership with Atlanta-based musician Ludacris, to promote the app.

Following the devastation caused by flooding in Baton Rouge in 2016, Roadie offered free pickup and delivery for all deliveries traveling to and from the Baton Rouge area.

In December 2020, Walmart named Roadie its top delivery partner for "Highest Driver Customer Satisfaction" and "Highest Net Promoter Score", after expanding into general merchandise deliveries as well as grocery that same year.
