= Rinse (company) =

San Francisco-based laundry and dry cleaning service

Rinse, Inc.
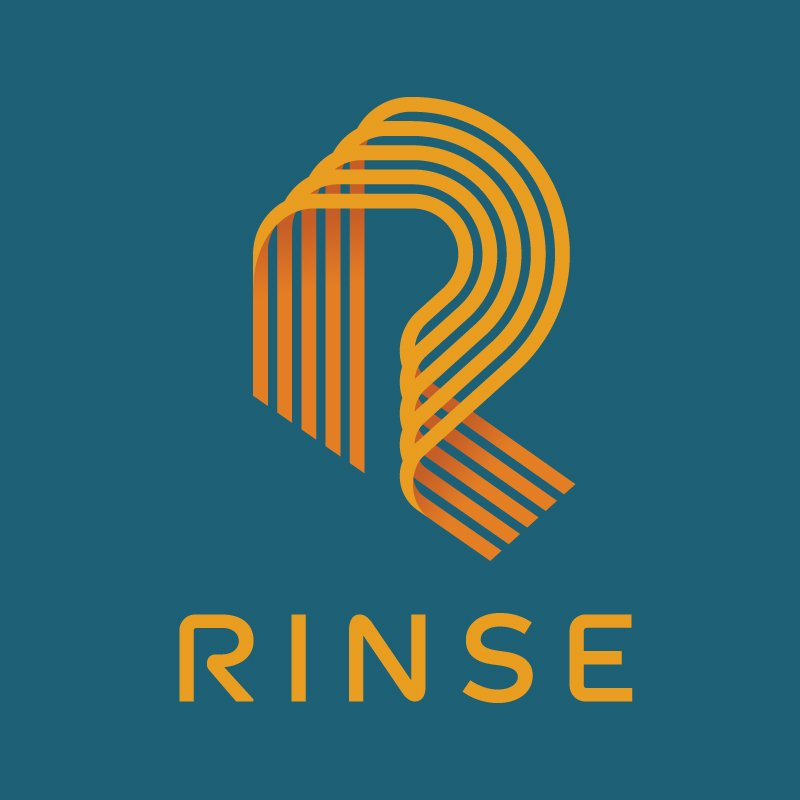
- Company type: Private company
- Industry: Personal Services
- Founded: 2013; 13 years ago
- Founders: Ajay Prakash (CEO); James Joun (COO)
- Headquarters: San Francisco, California, United States
- Area served: Austin, Boston, Chicago, Los Angeles, New Jersey, New York City, San Francisco Bay Area, Seattle, Washington D.C., Toronto
- Services: Laundry and dry cleaning services
- Website: www.rinse.com

Rinse, Inc., is an American on-demand laundry and dry cleaning services company headquartered in San Francisco, California. The company offers clothing pickup and delivery service.

== History ==
Rinse was founded in 2013 by entrepreneurs and Dartmouth College friends James Joun and Ajay Prakash. Joun was previously helping his parents in their dry cleaning storefront. After launching in San Francisco, the company expanded to California and raised $3.5 million in seed funding in June 2015.

In 2016, Rinse purchased the assets of Washio, shortly after the Los Angeles-based company shut operations. The company launched in New York City by acquiring FlyCleaners for an undisclosed amount in 2022. Other acquisitions include Cleanly's San Francisco operations in 2019, South Bay upstart OffToYou in 2020, Chicago-based dry cleaning startup Dryv in 2020, Los Angeles-based Butlerbox in 2021, New York-based laundry startup Room Service Laundry in 2022, and Seattle-based laundry startup Loopie in 2024.
