= Sittercity.com =

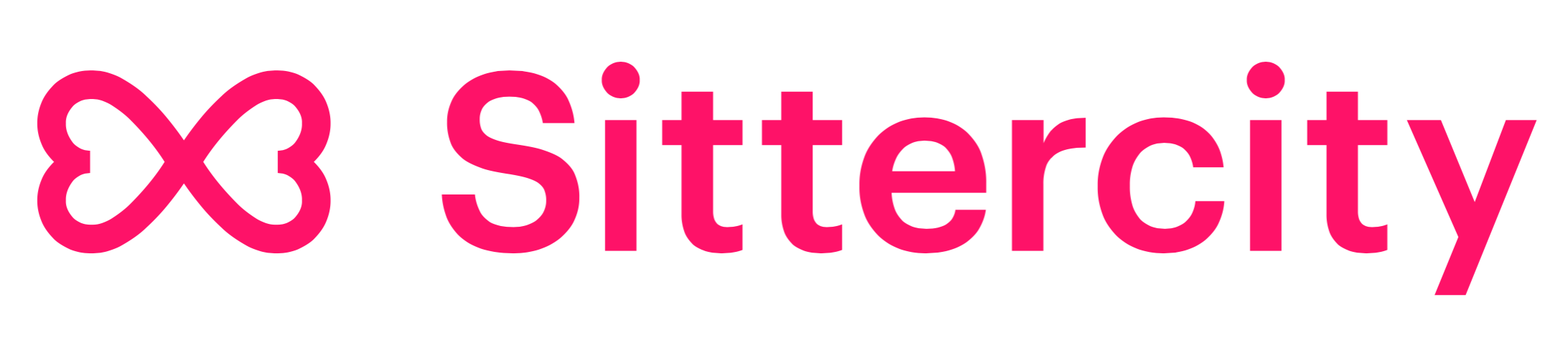
- Company type: Private
- Industry: Child care
- Founder: Genevieve Thiers
- Headquarters: 20 W. Kinzie, Suite 1500, Chicago, Illinois, USA
- Number of locations: 2
- Area served: US
- Key people: Zenobia Moochhala, CEO
- Revenue: Private
- Number of employees: 941
- Website: https://www.sittercity.com

Sittercity.com is an American online marketplace that connects babysitters, nannies, pet sitters, housekeepers, etc. with families.

== History ==
Sittercity was founded in 2001 by Genevieve Thiers. In 2011, Sittercity raised over 20 million dollars for further development on the company. Bright Horizons acquired the company in 2020 for an undisclosed amount. In 2021, Zenobia Moochhala took on the role as CEO.
