= Eternal Limited =

Food Delivery Company

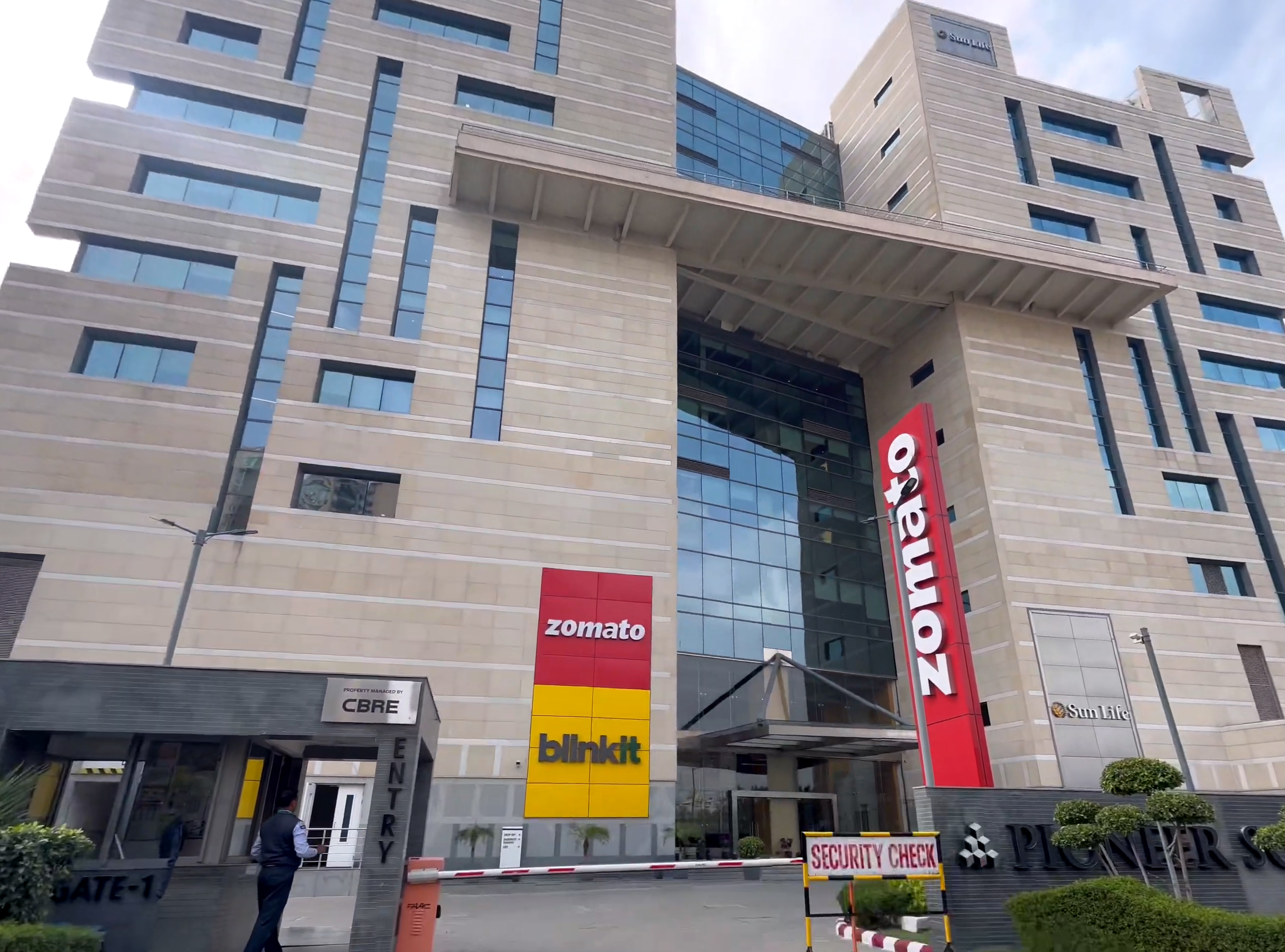
- Eternal headquarters in Gurugram
- Formerly: DC Foodiebay Online Services Pvt Ltd (2008–2012); Zomato Media Ltd (2012–2021); Zomato Ltd (2021–2025)
- Type: Public
- Traded as: BSE: 543320; NSE: ETERNAL; BSE SENSEX constituent; NSE NIFTY 50 constituent
- ISIN: INE758T01015
- Industry: Technology; E-commerce; Holding company
- Founded: 10 July 2008; 18 years ago
- Founders: Deepinder Goyal; Pankaj Chaddah
- Headquarters: Gurugram, Haryana, India
- Area served: India
- Key people: Deepinder Goyal (CEO & MD); Albinder Dhindsa (CEO, Blinkit)
- Services: Food delivery; Quick-commerce; Online ticketing; B2B grocery supply
- Revenue: ▲₹20,243 crore (US$2.1 billion) (2025)
- Operating income: ▲₹697 crore (US$72 million) (2025)
- Net income: ▲₹527 crore (US$55 million) (2025)
- Total assets: ▲₹35,623 crore (US$3.7 billion) (2025)
- Total equity: ▲₹30,317 crore (US$3.1 billion) (2025)
- Owners: Info Edge (12.38%); Deepinder Goyal (3.83%)
- Number of employees: 4,440 (2024)
- Subsidiaries: Zomato; Blinkit; Hyperpure; District
- Website: eternal.com
- Footnotes; Financials as of 31 March 2025.

Eternal Limited (formerly known as Zomato Limited) is an Indian multinational technology and consumer-services holding company based in Gurugram, Haryana. It operates as the parent entity for several digital platforms in India, including the restaurant aggregator and food delivery service Zomato, the quick-commerce grocery delivery service Blinkit, the business-to-business (B2B) food supply platform Hyperpure, and the live events and online ticketing platform District.

Founded as a restaurant discovery website called Foodiebay in 2010 by Deepinder Goyal and Pankaj Chaddah, the company rebranded to Zomato in 2012 and expanded its services to include online ordering, food delivery, and table reservations. The company grew its operations through acquisitions such as Urbanspoon, Runnr, and the Indian operations of Uber Eats. Following its initial public offering in 2021, the company expanded beyond restaurant delivery through Blinkit, Hyperpure, and District.

In February 2025, to reflect its transition into a multi-business conglomerate, the corporate entity officially rebranded as Eternal Limited. Its consumer-facing applications retained their individual branding. Eternal Limited is publicly traded on the National Stock Exchange (NSE) and the Bombay Stock Exchange (BSE), and is a constituent of the benchmark NIFTY 50 and BSE SENSEX indices. The company has faced scrutiny over labour practices involving delivery partners and other regulatory issues.

== History ==
=== Founding and early growth (2010–2014) ===
On 18 January 2010, Deepinder Goyal and Pankaj Chaddah incorporated DC Foodiebay Online Services Pvt Ltd. The company initially operated as Foodiebay, a restaurant-listing and recommendation website they had started in 2008 while working as analysts for Bain & Company. To solve the problem of inaccessible menus, the founders physically collected menus from local restaurants and uploaded them online. They later renamed the website to Zomato to avoid a potential trademark conflict with eBay and to prepare for expansion into verticals outside of food.

In 2011, Zomato expanded its restaurant discovery and local search services across various cities in India. In 2012, the company embarked on an international expansion. In early 2015, the platform had established operations in 21 countries, including the United Kingdom, South Africa, Canada, and the United Arab Emirates.

=== Acquisitions and food delivery (2014–2020) ===
Between 2014 and 2015, the company acquired several restaurant-discovery platforms across Europe, Oceania, and North America. These included MenuMania, Lunchtime.cz, Obedovat.sk, Gastronauci, Cibando, Mekanist, and Urbanspoon.

In March 2015, the company officially launched its food delivery service in India. It initially partnered with hyperlocal logistics companies such as Delhivery and Grab before acquiring delivery startup Runnr in 2017 to bring logistics in-house. The platform scaled its B2B operations by acquiring Wotu Technologies, rebranding it as Hyperpure to supply raw food ingredients directly to its partner restaurants.

In January 2020, Zomato acquired Uber Eats' India business in an all-stock deal. The acquisition gave Uber a 9.99% stake in Zomato and created a duopoly in the Indian food delivery market between Zomato and Swiggy.

=== Initial public offering and diversification (2021–2024) ===
In July 2021, the company went public on the BSE and NSE, opening its IPO at a valuation of over US$8 billion. The stock jumped over 80% on its market debut. Following the IPO, the company initiated a series of minority investments in various Indian technology startups.

In June 2022, the company completed the acquisition of quick-commerce company Blinkit (formerly Grofers) for US$568 million. Expanding further into the "going-out" economy, the company acquired Paytm's event ticketing subsidiaries—Wasteland Entertainment Private Limited (WEPL) and Orbgen Technologies Private Limited (OTPL)—for US$244.2 million in August 2024. These assets were consolidated to launch the District app in November 2024, designed for movie bookings, dining reservations, and live events.

=== Rebranding to Eternal Limited (2025) ===
In early 2025, the parent company's reliance on food delivery decreased as the Blinkit, Hyperpure, and District platforms became established business segments. On 6 February 2025, CEO Deepinder Goyal announced that the corporate holding entity would officially be renamed from Zomato Limited to Eternal Limited. The name "Eternal" was previously used internally after the Blinkit acquisition to distinguish the corporate umbrella from its consumer applications. While the parent entity listed on stock exchanges adopted the new name, consumer-facing brands including the Zomato app maintained their individual identities.

== Operations ==
Eternal Limited operates through four principal business verticals that serve distinct consumer and business markets: Zomato, Blinkit, Hyperpure, and District.

The Zomato platform acts as a restaurant aggregator, food delivery, and dining-out service. It connects customers with restaurant partners and a network of delivery personnel. Blinkit is the company's quick-commerce platform, which delivers groceries and daily essentials.

Hyperpure functions as a vertically integrated supply chain and B2B platform. It provides fresh produce, meats, and kitchen supplies directly to partner restaurants. District operates as a consolidated "going-out" platform managing live events, concerts, movie ticketing, and dining reservations.

== Funding ==
Eternal Limited received early funding from several venture capital and private equity firms. Between 2010 and 2013, the company raised approximately US$16.7 million from Info Edge, which held a 57.9% stake as of February 2013. Additional funding rounds between 2014 and 2015 totaled over US$170 million, led by Sequoia Capital, Vy Capital, and Temasek. The company reached unicorn status in 2018 following a US$200 million investment from Ant Financial at a US$1.1 billion valuation. In 2021, a US$250 million round from investors including Tiger Global Management pushed its pre-IPO valuation to US$5.4 billion.

== Financial performance ==
The company achieved profitability across its business verticals prior to its 2025 rebranding. For the fiscal year ending March 2025, Eternal reported consolidated revenues of ₹20,243 crore and a net income of ₹527 crore.

By July 2025, Blinkit had overtaken the company's core food delivery business in overall transaction value. Prominent public shareholders include Info Edge and founder Deepinder Goyal.

== Controversies and criticism ==
The company has faced scrutiny over its labour practices and the treatment of its delivery personnel. Operating within the gig economy, the classification of delivery partners as independent contractors has been a subject of public debate. In 2023, hundreds of delivery partners operating under Blinkit went on strike in the National Capital Region. They protested sudden alterations to their payout structures, causing temporary operational shutdowns.

In March 2024, the company launched a "Pure Veg" fleet featuring delivery partners in green uniforms exclusively delivering from vegetarian restaurants. Critics argued the move effectively segregated delivery partners and inadvertently promoted casteist and discriminatory practices. They also raised concerns that the visual distinction exposed delivery riders in standard red uniforms to harassment in hyper-segregated neighborhoods. Following the public backlash, CEO Deepinder Goyal rolled back the green uniforms and boxes within 24 hours, though the pure-veg routing algorithm was maintained.
