= Zepto (company) =

Quick-commerce company

- Formerly: KiranaKart
- Type: Private
- Industry: Quick-commerce
- Founded: July 2021; 5 years ago in Mumbai, Maharashtra, India
- Headquarters: Bengaluru, Karnataka, India
- Number of locations: 1000+ stores (2026)
- Key people: Aadit Palicha (CEO); Nikhil Mittal (CTO)
- Services: Online grocer
- Revenue: ▲₹9,366 crore (US$970 million) (2025)
- Net income: ▼₹−3,367 crore (US$−350 million) (2024)
- Number of employees: 16,898 (March 2026)
- Website: zepto.com

Zepto is an Indian quick-commerce company headquartered in Bengaluru. It was founded in July 2021 by Aadit Palicha and Kaivalya Vohra. As of August 2024, the company is valued at over $5 billion and operates over 250 dark-stores across ten metropolitan areas in India.

== History ==
Aadit Palicha started KiranaKart with Kaivalya Vohra in 2020 when they were 17 years old. Palicha and Vohra skipped college to start Zepto, instead raising capital from Contrary, which offered to invest if they dropped out of Stanford University.

Palicha and Vohra originally branded the company as KiranaKart and focused on facilitating grocery delivery by partnering with local kirana stores, but that approach did not gain traction. They also participated in Y Combinator's accelerator program while building out the first version of the platform.

In 2021, the company rebranded to Zepto and verticalized the operation, building a network of dark stores to fulfill orders. In April 2022, Zepto launched Cafe, a division focused on delivery of coffee and ready-to-eat food. In February 2023, the company launched Bloom, a platform for farmers to manage food production and distribute goods from villages to cities.

Zepto and other major delivery platforms including Zomato, Blinkit, and Swiggy employ over 3 million gig workers. The company began a paid membership program in February 2024, which has over 4 million subscribers as of April 2024.

In 2024, Zepto moved its headquarters from Mumbai to Bengaluru.

== Funding ==
In January 2021, KiranaKart (now Zepto) raised $730,000 in a pre-seed round led by Contrary Capital, which was the first check into Zepto, at a $2.5 million valuation. Other participants in the pre-seed round included Global Founders Capital, 2 AM Ventures, and angel investors.

In October 2021, it raised $60 million from Nexus, Y Combinator, Global Founders Capital, as well as angel investors Lachy Groom, Neeraj Arora and Manik Gupta at $225 million valuation.

In December 2021, the company raised $100 million Series C round led by Y Combinator's Continuity Fund at a valuation of $570 million.

In May 2022, Zepto raised $200 million at $900 million valuation as a part of its Series D round which was again led by Y Combinator's Continuity Fund. Investors including Nexus Venture Partners, Glade Brook Capital and Contrary Capital participated in the new round.

In August 2023, Zepto raised $200 million as part of its Series E round at a $1.4 billion valuation, becoming a unicorn. It raised funds from U.S-based investment firms StepStone Group and Goodwater Capital. Existing backers including Nexus Venture Partners and Glade Brook Capital also participated in the deal.

In June 2024, Zepto raised $665 million funding at $3.6 billion valuation as part of its Series F round and $340 million funding at a $5 billion valuation two months later, raising over $1 billion in 2024 and more than $1.5 billion since its inception.

In October 2025, Zepto raised $450 million in a funding round that valued the company at $7 billion. The round included participation from new and existing investors such as the California Public Employees' Retirement System (CalPERS), General Catalyst, Goodwater Capital, and Lightspeed.

Round	Size	Valuation	Lead Investor(s)
Pre-Seed	$730,000	$2.5 million	Contrary
Series A	$60 million	$225 million	Glade Brook Capital
Series C	$100 million	$570 million	Y Combinator
Series D	$200 million	$900 million	Y Combinator
Series E	$200 million	$1.4 billion	StepStone Group
Series F	$665 million	$3.6 billion	Glade Brook, Nexus and Stepstone
Follow up round	$340 million	$5 billion	General Catalyst

In August 2026, Zepto deferred its IPO plans and was reported to be seeking around 1,000 crore through a pre-IPO placement. the proposed funding was expected to come primarily from existing and domestic investors, while the company continued to consider a future public listings.

== Reception ==
In April 2022, Anand Mahindra commented that q-commerce delivery is "inhuman" to the delivery workers that Zepto and peers contract to fulfill orders. Aadit Palicha, the co-founder of the company responded that only speeds of less than 15 km/h are necessary to make deliveries.

Since 2024, Zepto has faced criticism for employing dark patterns in its app, including differential pricing and hidden charges on the final bill. Zepto has also been criticised for its drip pricing and price gouging practices.

On 12 October 2026, the Bengaluru East City Corporation (BECC) fined Zepto Rs.5,000 for failing to follow local solid waste segregation rules. The action was part of a larger engorcement campaign targeting commercial waste management violations across the city.

On 24 October 2026, the Uttar Pradesh Food Safety and Drug Administration (UPFSDA) suspended the licenses of four dark stores and warehouses operated by online food delivery and quick- commerce platforms. The closures were ordered following state-wide regulatory inspections that identified non-compliance with statutory food safety standards.
