= Breadfast =

Online grocery delivery service in Egypt

- Native name: بريدفاست
- Type: Private
- Industry: E-commerce • Quick commerce • Online grocery delivery
- Founded: 2017
- Founder: Mostafa Amin; Muhammad Habib; Abdallah Nofal
- Headquarters: Cairo, Egypt
- Area served: Egypt (primarily Cairo, Giza, Alexandria, Mansoura)
- Key people: Mostafa Amin (CEO)
- Products: Groceries, baked goods, household essentials, ready-to-eat meals, pharmacy, beauty products
- Services: On-demand delivery (under 60 minutes)
- Revenue: > $150 million (2024)
- Number of employees: 501–1,000 (as of recent reports)
- Website: www.breadfast.com

Breadfast (Arabic: بريدفاست) is an Egypt-based online grocery delivery service operating a vertically integrated supply chain model. It delivers groceries, freshly baked goods, household essentials, ready-to-eat meals, pharmacy items, and beauty products, with over 7,000 stock-keeping units (SKUs) available, including fresh bread, coffee, fruits, vegetables, dairy, meat, and consumer packaged goods (CPG) staples.

The company emphasizes rapid on-demand delivery, typically within 60 minutes, by controlling its own bakeries, fulfillment centers, inventory, and logistics to minimize reliance on third-party suppliers.

== History ==
Breadfast was founded in 2017 by Mostafa Amin, Muhammad Habib, and Abdallah Nofal, initially focusing on delivering fresh bread to customers' doorsteps every morning.

The company expanded rapidly, joining the Y Combinator accelerator in 2019. It has since grown into a leading quick-commerce platform in Egypt, processing nearly 1 million orders per month for over 300,000 active users as of recent reports.

== Operations ==
Breadfast operates its own bakeries and 39 fulfillment centers across Cairo, Giza, Alexandria, and Mansoura. This vertical integration allows control over the supply chain, enabling fast delivery of thousands of SKUs.

The service has expanded beyond groceries to include ready-to-eat meals, pharmacy, beauty, and household care items, with additional offerings like private-label products and Breadfast Pay (fintech services).

== Funding ==
Breadfast has raised significant funding across multiple rounds. Early investors included 500 Startups and Mohamed El Sewedy. In November 2021, it closed a $26 million Series A round led by Vostok New Ventures and Endure Capital, bringing total funding to $33 million at the time.

Subsequent rounds included $10 million in Series B2 (2025, led by Novastar Ventures with EBRD participation), pushing valuation near $400 million. In early 2026, a $50 million pre-Series C round was secured, backed by Mubadala Investment Company, a Saudi billionaire family, SBI Investment, Olayan Financing Company, and others, with plans for further expansion into Africa and a larger round in 2026.
