= District (Eternal) =

Mobile application operated by Wasteland Entertainment Private Limited

- Website type: Discovery and booking of movies, live events, sports, activities, dining reservations and shopping
- Owner: Wasteland Entertainment Private Limited
- Website: district.in
- Launched: November 15, 2024
- Current status: Active

District is a mobile application operated by Wasteland Entertainment Private Limited, a subsidiary of Eternal Limited (formerly Zomato Limited). The app lets users find and book dining, entertainment and other activities, and pay at participating restaurants and stores. In India, it offers dining reservations, movie and live-event ticketing, and other activities. Its services in the United Arab Emirates cover dining, live entertainment, attractions and activities.

Eternal combined its dining discovery and reservation service with the movie and live-event ticketing businesses it had acquired from Paytm, then launched District in November 2024. Orbgen Technologies Private Limited and Wasteland Entertainment Private Limited were included in the acquisition.

== History ==
Zomato offered dining reservations in its app before District was launched. It also sold live-event tickets through a "Zomato Live" tab, including tickets to Zomaland, its food and entertainment festival. In August 2024, Eternal announced plans to buy Paytm's entertainment ticketing businesses for about ₹2,048 crore ($244 million). The purchase included Orbgen Technologies, which operated the TicketNew movie-ticketing platform, and Wasteland Entertainment, the operator of the Insider events platform.

On 15 November 2024, District was released for iOS and Android. Movie ticketing, live-event ticketing and dining reservations were available at launch. The Paytm Insider and TicketNew apps remained in operation for a transition period. After rejoining Zomato in 2024, Rahul Ganjoo became District's chief executive officer.

The app launched in the United Arab Emirates in August 2025, offering dining, live entertainment, attractions and activities.

District produced the first edition of Rolling Loud India in November 2025 under intellectual property rights obtained from Rolling Loud, LLC, and was the festival's exclusive ticket seller. The festival was held in Navi Mumbai. Its headliners were Central Cee, Karan Aujla, Wiz Khalifa and Don Toliver. A 2026 edition was announced at the 2025 festival for 12 and 13 December 2026.

For the 2026 Indian Premier League season, District was the official ticketing partner for the playoffs and final, and for the home matches of five franchises: Chennai Super Kings, Delhi Capitals, Punjab Kings, Sunrisers Hyderabad and Rajasthan Royals.

In April 2026, Eternal transferred District's technology platform to Wasteland Entertainment, its subsidiary, for about ₹24.19 crore.

In June 2026, District hosted the launch of a footwear collection by one8, a brand co-founded by Virat Kohli, with pre-bookings on the app used as entry passes. In the same month, its live-events business staged The FRIENDS Experience – The One at Jio World Garden in Mumbai, a show from Warner Bros. Discovery Global Themed Entertainment and partners that had not previously been staged in India. In July 2026, Etihad Arena in Abu Dhabi named District UAE its official ticketing partner.

== Services ==
Users can find dining, movies, live events, shopping, parks, attractions, monuments and sports courts on District and make bookings and payments through the app. As of 2026, District operates in ten Indian cities and the UAE.
