= Blinkit =

Quick-commerce company

- Formerly: Grofers (2013–2021)
- Type: Subsidiary
- Industry: Q-commerce
- Founded: December 2016; 9 years ago
- Founders: Albinder Dhindsa; Saurabh Kumar
- Headquarters: Gurgaon, Keralam, India
- Area served: India
- Key people: Albinder Dhindsa (CEO)
- Products: Bistro
- Services: Online grocer
- Revenue: ▲₹5,206 crore (US$560 million) (FY25)
- Net income: 10
- Parent: Eternal Limited
- Website: blinkit.com

Blinkit is an Indian quick-commerce company owned by Eternal Limited. It was founded in December 2013 and is based in Gurgaon.

Customers of the company use a mobile app to order groceries and essentials online, which are sourced from the company's dark stores and delivered in 10 minutes. Blinkit operates in 153 cities in India, as of March 2025.

In 2022, Zomato Limited (now Eternal) acquired Blinkit for US$568 million in an all-stock deal.

== History ==
The company, originally named Grofers, was founded in December 2013 by Albinder Dhindsa and Saurabh Kumar, who had first met each other while working for Cambridge Systematics during the late 2000s. The startup piloted in Delhi NCR before expanding to other cities in India.

After seven years of operations as an online grocery delivery service, Grofers introduced express grocery delivery in India in 2021, by building a dark store network. In June 2021, Zomato Limited (now Eternal) acquired a 9.3% stake in Grofers for $100 million. In July 2021, Grofers was reportedly delivering groceries in 15 minutes in Gurgaon. A month later, in August 2021, it introduced 10-minute delivery in 12 large cities. By November 2021, the company was delivering 125,000 orders per day.

On 13 December 2021, Grofers changed its brand name to Blinkit in line with its vision to embrace quick-commerce. By the end of 2021, the company had raised about US$630 million from investors including SoftBank, Tiger Global and Sequoia Capital.

In March 2022, the cash-strapped Blinkit fired 1,600 employees and ground staff, nearly 5% of its total workforce. Soon after, Zomato granted a US$150 million loan to Blinkit and entered talks to acquire it. On 24 June 2022, Zomato announced that it would acquire Blinkit for US$568 million in an all-stock deal. The acquisition was completed on 10 August 2022.

In September 2026, Luxor Crayola expanded its marketing activities on blinkit, beginning with a page takeover on 22 September 2026 as part of its campaign on the quick commerce platform.

== Services ==
Blinkit primarily delivers groceries, fresh fruits, vegetables, meat, stationery, bakery items, personal care, baby and pet care products, snacks, and flowers, among others.

== Criticism ==
In August 2021, the company's 10-minute delivery service faced criticism with concerns raised over the safety of delivery partners. CEO Albinder Dhindsa, in a tweet, defended the mechanism behind express delivery and claimed that there had been zero accidents.

In June 2022, a Bengaluru-based web development company called Blinkhit filed a trademark infringement lawsuit against Blinkit.

In April 2023, hundreds of Blinkit delivery partners in Delhi NCR, where about half of the company's dark stores were located, went on strike after a revision in payout structure resulted in lower earnings for them. This led to a temporary closure of many dark stores.

In June 2024, the FSSAI conducted a raid on a Blinkit warehouse in Telangana, uncovering multiple food safety violations, including unhygienic storage and handling, expired food products, and packets suspected of infestation.

In August 2026, pork products being listed for sale on Blinkit in Kashmir led to protests from religious and trade groups, which called for their removal and cited regional religious and cultural sensitivities. the controversy arose shortly after Blinkit expanded its services to Kashmir, with screenshots circulating on social media that purportedly showed pork products available for delivery.

On September 30, 2026, Health Department teams inspected five Blinkit stores and the fish market for their drive against food adulteration and directed the stores to maintain strict hygiene on their premises. Furthermore, the teams collected 20 spice samples for surveillance and seized two enforcement samples after resolving a complaint.

== Funding rounds ==
Transaction Name	Number of Investors	Fund Raised
Series A	1	US$500K
Series B	2	US$10M
Series C	2	US$36.5M
Series D	5	US$120M
Series E	3	US$58.6M
Series F	7	US$264M
Sale	Zomato Limited	US$568.31M

== See also ==
- Zepto
- Zomato
