= Swiggy =

Indian online food delivery company

Swiggy Limited
- Type: Public
- Traded as: NSE: SWIGGY; BSE: 544289
- ISIN: INE00H001014
- Industry: Food delivery; Q-commerce
- Founded: 26 December 2013; 12 years ago
- Founders: Sriharsha Majety; Nandan Reddy; Rahul Jaimini
- Headquarters: Bengaluru, Karnataka, India
- Area served: 700 cities (2025)
- Key people: Sriharsha Majety (CEO); Rohit Kapoor (CEO – Food); Phani Kishan Addepalli (CEO – Instamart); Rahul Bothra (CFO); Madhusudhan Rao (CTO)
- Services: Online food ordering; Online grocery
- Revenue: ▲₹163.33 billion (US$1.7 billion) (2025)
- Operating income: ▼₹−19.1 billion (US$−200 million) (2025)
- Net income: ▼₹−31.07 billion (US$−320 million) (2025)
- Owners: Prosus (25.4%); SoftBank (7.6%); Accel (5.4%); Sriharsha Majety (4.9%)
- Number of employees: 6,000 (2023)
- Subsidiaries: Dineout
- Website: swiggy.com
- Footnotes; Financials as of 31 March 2025.

Swiggy is an Indian online food ordering and delivery company, headquartered in Bengaluru. As of 2025, it operates food delivery services in more than 700 Indian cities, and quick-commerce services under the name Instamart in 100 cities. The company was incorporated in 2013.

Swiggy competes primarily with Zomato in food delivery. In quick-commerce, Instamart ranks behind competitors Blinkit and Zepto in terms of market share as of 2025.

== History ==
In 2013, Sriharsha Majety and Nandan Reddy designed an e-commerce website called Bundl to facilitate courier service and shipping within India. Bundl was halted in 2014 and rebranded to enter the food delivery market. Majety and Reddy approached Rahul Jaimini, formerly with Myntra, and launched Swiggy in August 2014.

By 2015, Swiggy expanded its food delivery operations from just Bengaluru to eight Tier 1 cities across India. At the time, the food delivery sector was in turmoil as several notable startups, such as Foodpanda (later acquired by Ola Cabs), TinyOwl (later acquired by Zomato) and Ola Cafe (later closed) were struggling.

In January 2017, Swiggy started its cloud kitchen chain called "The Bowl Company". In November 2017, Swiggy started a kitchen incubator business called Swiggy Access, opening a network of ready-to-occupy kitchens for its restaurant partners. By 2019, over 1,000 Swiggy Access kitchens were operational, according to a TechCrunch report.

In mid-2018, Swiggy was operational in 16 Indian cities, which increased to 500 cities in 2019, matching the scale of rival Zomato.

In early 2019, Swiggy expanded into general product deliveries under the name Swiggy Stores, sourcing items from local stores. In September 2019, Swiggy launched Swiggy Go, a package delivery service. In April 2020, it rebranded Swiggy Go as Swiggy Genie. During the COVID-19 pandemic in India, it began doorstep delivery of alcohol in the states of Jharkhand, West Bengal and Odisha.

In May 2020, Swiggy laid off 1,100 employees during the pandemic. The pandemic also resulted in the shut down of more than three-fourths of its cloud kitchens.

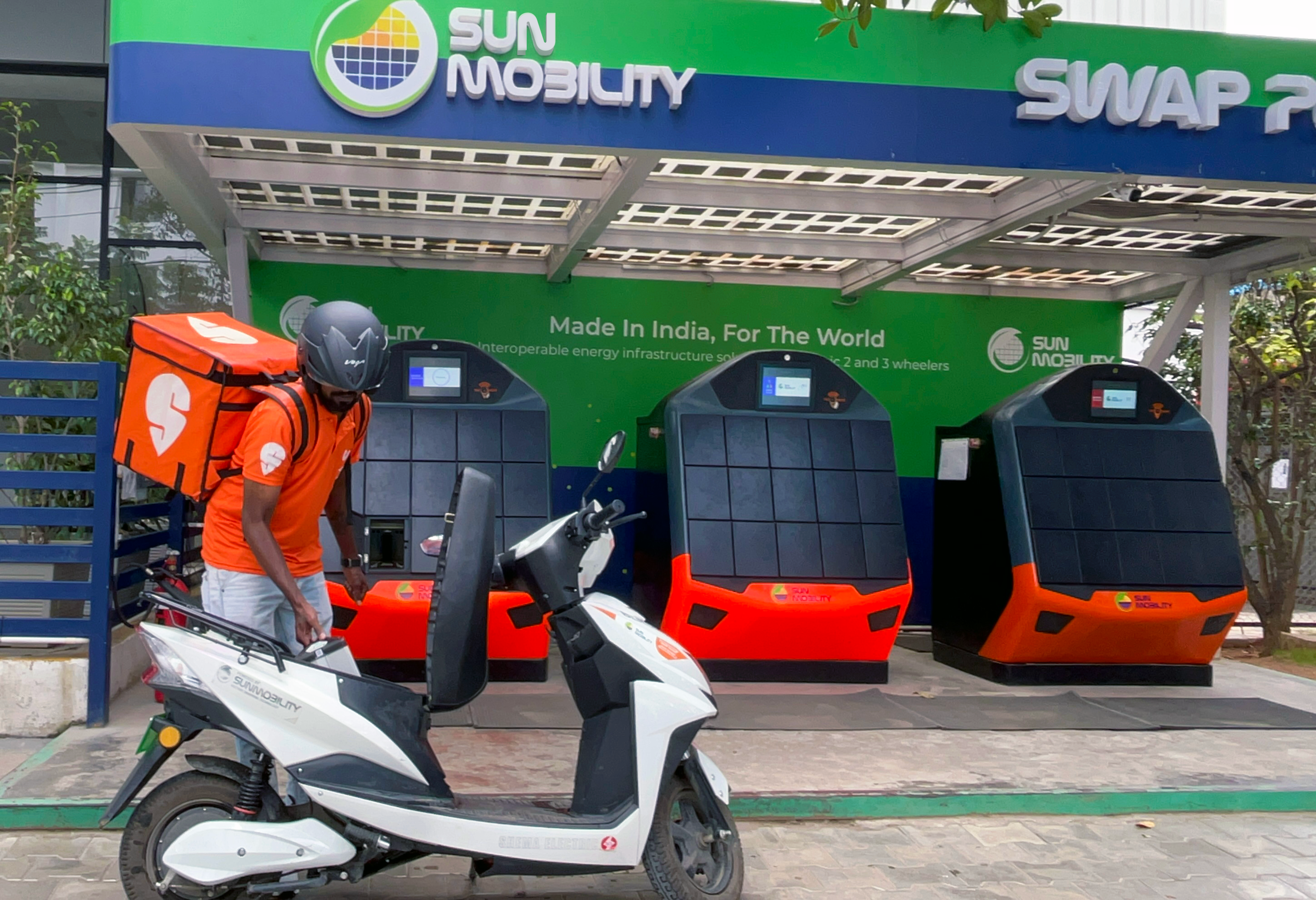
A Swiggy delivery partner swapping the battery of his electric scooter

In August 2020, Swiggy launched its instant grocery delivery service called Instamart using a network of dark stores. In early 2021, the company closed Swiggy Stores and expanded its operations under Instamart.

In 2022, Swiggy acquired the dining and table reservation platform Dineout from Times Internet in an all-stock deal valued at $120 million.

In 2023, it sold Swiggy Access kitchens to Kitchens@ in a share-swap deal.

In January 2024, Swiggy laid off 400 employees, or 6% of its workforce, ahead of IPO.

In April 2024, Swiggy converted itself into a public limited company and confidentially filed for an initial public offering. Swiggy launched its initial public offering (IPO) in November 2024 at ₹390 (US$4.00) per share, valuing the company at $11.3 billion.

In December 2024, Swiggy launched an events and ticketing service called Scenes. In May 2025, it shut down its same-day package delivery service Genie.

In July 2025, Swiggy expanded its quick-commerce business Instamart to 127 cities across India and added 41 new dark stores.

On 23 october 2026, Swiggy fell to a record low after wider losses raised investor concerns regarding cash burn and the timeframe for achieving profitability.
