= OurHarvest =

Defunct New York online grocery store

OurHarvest LLC
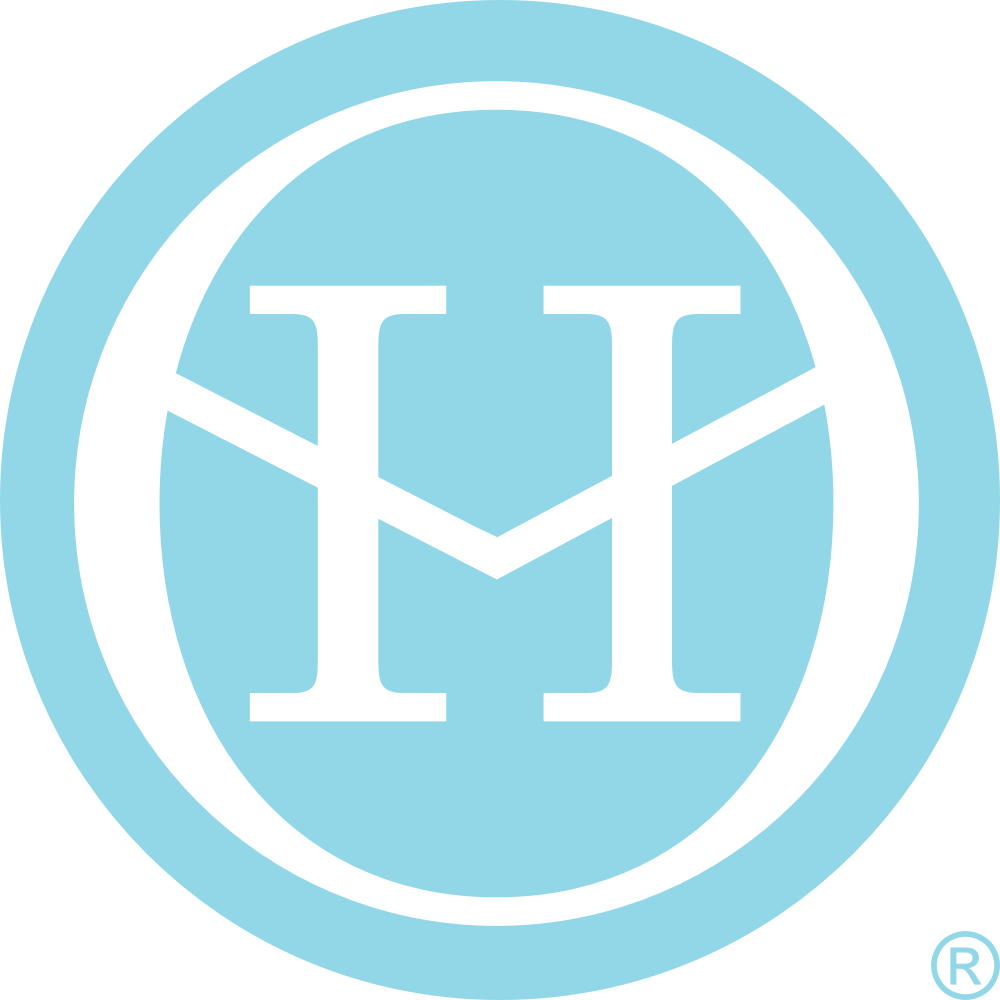
- Company type: Private
- Industry: Grocery store; Health food store; Farmer's market
- Founded: April 1, 2014; 12 years ago
- Founders: Michael Winik and Scott Reich
- Defunct: c. 2023
- Fate: Unknown
- Headquarters: Hicksville, New York, United States
- Area served: New York City
- Products: 600 (April 2016)
- Website: ourharvest.com

OurHarvest was an American online grocer that offered pick-up and delivery to the New York Metropolitan area. The company was founded in 2014. As of 2023, the company website (ourharvest.com) is no longer live.

== Background ==
OurHarvest was founded in 2014 by Michael Winik and Scott Reich.

The company sold groceries and other products. OurHarvest resold directly from suppliers, and stored products in refrigerated trucks.

The company had a 2,500-square-foot sorting facility in Hicksville, New York.
