= Rodion Shishkov =

Russian-born Israeli-British tech entrepreneur

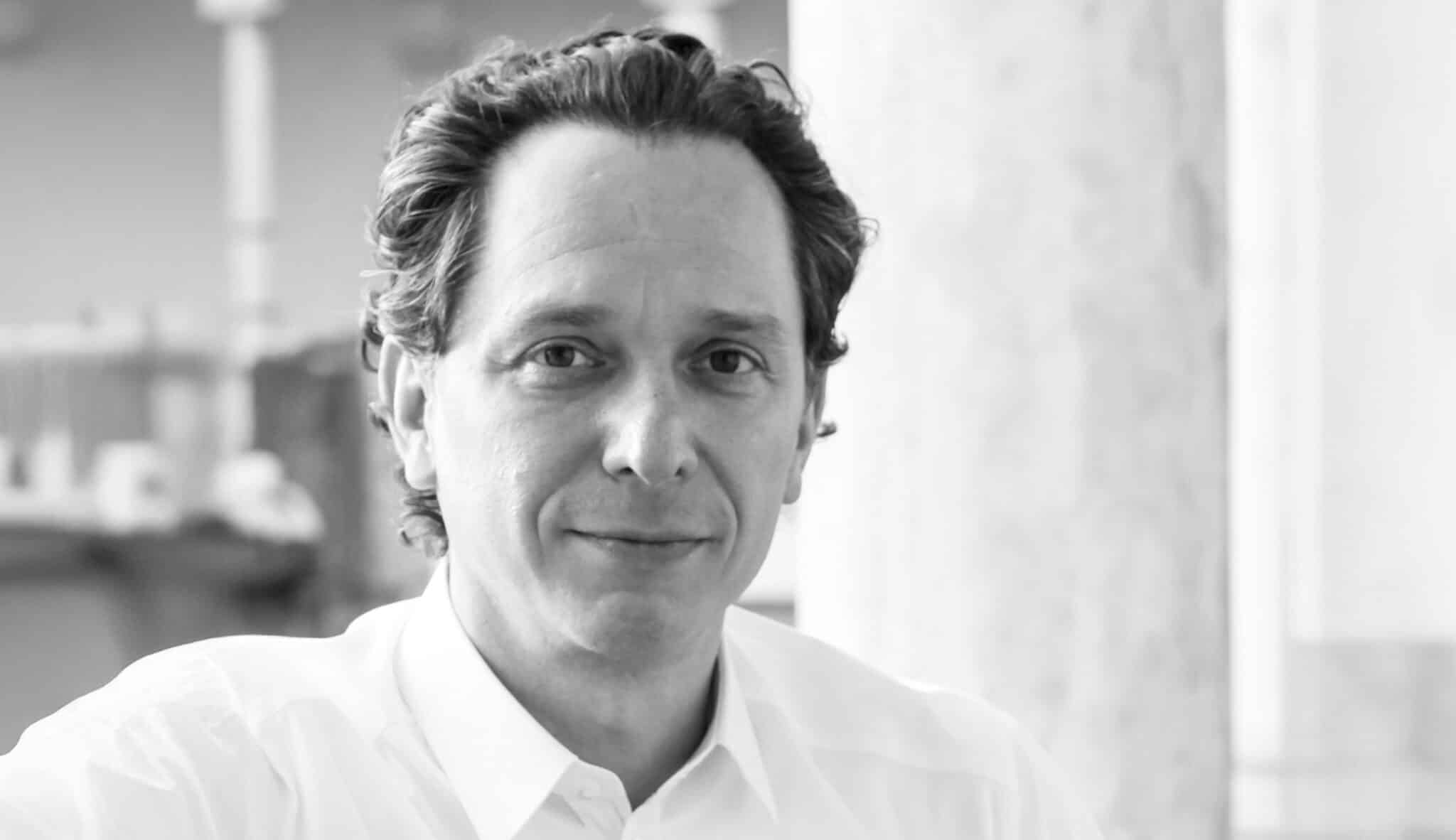
- Rodion Shishkov
- Born: July 9, 1980 (age 45); Leningrad, USSR
- Education: Saint Petersburg State University of Economics and Finance (2002)
- Occupation: Entrepreneur
- Years active: Since 1999
- Known for: Samokat and Buyk rapid delivery apps

Rodion Shishkov (born July 9, 1980, in Leningrad, USSR) is a Russian-born Israeli-British tech entrepreneur.

Rodion is the co-founder and CEO of All3, an AI and robotics company in the construction sector.

He also founded Samokat and Buyk dark store rapid delivery services.

His company TRA Robotics designs and builds highly automated microfactories. The company sold to British commercial electric vehicle manufacturer Arrival.

He's also a former Yota and Russian Post executive, responsible for developing and delivering new digital services.

== Early years ==
Rodion Shishkov was born in Leningrad on July 9, 1980. He holds a degree in Marketing from Saint Petersburg State University of Economics and Finance (2002).

== Career and entrepreneurship ==
He embarked on his entrepreneurial journey at the age of 19, gaining diverse experience across retail, real estate development, telecommunications, and IT.

=== Yota ===
Rodion Shishkov held executive positions in Yota from 2008 to 2013. He was the head of the company's R&D center Yota Lab. He managed the creation of the music streaming service Yota Music and movie streaming platform Yota Play which was later rebranded to Okko and became Russia's second largest video streaming service by 2019. Shishkov resigned from Yota as the company's vice president of innovations.

=== Russian Post ===
From 2013 to 2017, Rodion Shishkov was the deputy CEO of the Russian Post, responsible for digital services, new products, and integrations with public services. He set the basis for the company's information technology and digitalization team (Pochta Tech) and started the digital transformation of the Russian Post. Under his management, the company launched its own payment gateway, API for delivery services automation, online subscription to newspapers and magazines, a digital official mail service with acknowledgment of receipt, and a web portal focused on all the new digital services provided by the Russian Post.

=== TRA Robotics ===
Shishkov is the founder of TRA Robotics. The company designs and builds automated microfactories allowing for flexible, software-driven manufacturing with capital expenditures a dozen times less than traditional factories.

TRA Robotics sold to commercial electric vehicle manufacturer Arrival

=== Samokat ===
In 2017, Rodion Shishkov and Slava Bocharov founded Smart.Space, a company and app focused on improving service convenience in business centers and residential complexes. Among other services, it provided a rapid delivery of grocery and consumer goods under the name Magazinchik (Russian: a small shop). In January 2018, it was split into a separate company Samokat, which became the first dark store delivery service (according to Inc. magazine) and was the fastest-growing food technology company in Russia.

Samokat's complex technological background included demand forecasting and delivery control systems. It became the world's second app (after Getir) to offer a 15-minute delivery. By 2021, Samokat made up to 900,000 deliveries monthly. In April 2020, a controlling share in Samokat was acquired by Sberbank and the Mail.ru Group. Samokat became No. 1 in the E-grocery market by revenue, number of orders, and market share in online food sales, holding a 17% share, and broke into the top 5 FMCG retailers.

=== Buyk ===
Following the success of Samokat in Russia, Shishkov and Bocharov launched a US-based dark store delivery company Buyk, which used some elements of Samokat's technological backend. Buyk began operations in New York City in September 2021 and in Chicago in December. By the end of 2022, the company planned to expand to Boston, Houston, and Miami. The growth was supported by investments from Fort Ross Ventures and Lev Leviev's LVL1 venture fund.

By the time Russia launched the full-scale invasion into Ukraine, Buyk was between the funding rounds and fully dependent on bridge financing from its founders. The sanctions against Sberbank (also the investor of Fort Ross Ventures) hampered their ability to continue funding Buyk. On March 17, 2022, the company filed for bankruptcy.

=== All3 ===
In 2023, alongside Slava Bocharov, Rodion founded All3, an AI and robotics company in the construction sector. With its proprietary advanced AI and robotics technology, All3 offers bespoke designs and manufacturing with minimal human input by streamlining processes, reducing inefficiencies and costs, and significantly boosting productivity. All3 delivers an end-to-end approach, targeting maximum impact across the entire value chain, in order to tackle the global housing crisis.

== Other interests ==
His interest in the intersection of technology, art, and design has led him to support initiatives, such as the Upsala Circus, Urgent Projects charitable foundation, and to co-found the International Art and Design Fair TAAD in Tel Aviv.

=== Tel Aviv Art and Design Fair ===
TAAD (Tel Aviv Art and Design Fair) is an international design and art fair held in Tel Aviv, Israel. It was founded in 2024 by Maria Nesimov, an art historian, curator, and advisor, and Rodion Shishkov, with the aim of bridging Israel’s design community with the global stage while redefining the role of design in everyday life.

TAAD showcases over 500 pieces from more than 100 designers, handpicked from leading galleries worldwide The fair emphasises high-quality, collectible design, aiming to establish Tel Aviv as a cultural hub for contemporary art and design. The fair’s chief curator is Maria Cristina Didero, a Milan-based independent design curator and consultant. In January 2022 she was appointed Design Miami yearly curatorial director, curating both the Basel and Miami Beach fairs under the overarching theme of The Golden Age.

The first edition of TAAD, launched in March 2025, centered around the theme "Everyday Wonder," exploring how design elevates daily routines and rituals.
