= Chaldal =

Bangladeshi grocery and food website

- Native name: চালডাল
- Type: Private
- Industry: Food and Grocery
- Founded: September 2013
- Headquarters: Dhaka, Bangladesh
- Area served: Dhaka; Chattogram; Narayanganj; Jashore; Khulna; Sylhet; Rajshahi; Gazipur
- Key people: Waseem Alim (CEO); Mahbub M M Muntasin (COO); Rezaur Rahman Jitu (CTO)
- Brands: BanglaMeds; Cookups; Chalao; GoGo Bangla; Protocol
- Services: Online grocer
- Number of employees: 2300+ (2023)
- Website: chaldal.com

Chaldal (Bengali: চালডাল, lit. 'rice-dal'), founded in 2013, is a grocery e-commerce platform in Bangladesh. The company offers its services via a website and mobile apps for Android and iOS. “Chaldal” is a Bengali word colloquially used to refer to "groceries" (Chal means Rice, and Dal means Pulses). Chaldal started as an online grocery service provider and has since gone on to redefine supply chains, ease commodity trade, support refugee camps, and reduce food wastage by building technology into the supply chain, all the way back to the farms.

Chaldal operates in Dhaka, Narayanganj, Chittagong, Jashore, Khulna, Sylhet, and Rajshahi. As of February 2022, it has a total of 28 active warehouses.

== History ==
Chaldal was founded by Waseem Alim (Founder and CEO), Zia Ashraf (Founder and COO), and Tejas Viswanath (Founder and CTO). The company initially started with one warehouse/ office in Gulshan, Dhaka while offering next day delivery.

In 2017, Chaldal received financing from IFC (International Finance Corporation), World Bank. The company has also received funding from other private, national and international venture capitalists through different series of investments.

Chaldal has a website and Android and iOS app for smartphone users where users can order products. Orders can also be phoned in. Customers can choose their preferred time slots for delivery.

== Business model ==
Chaldal has been described as one of the earliest grocery delivery startups to adopt the "dark store" model, stocking its own inventory in dedicated warehouses rather than sourcing from retail partners, which allows it to offer real-time product availability and delivery within an hour. Beyond its core grocery marketplace, the company operates GoGo Bangla, an on-demand logistics service that delivers orders for other small e-commerce businesses, and the Chaldal Vegetable Network, which connects farmers directly with retailers to supply fresh produce.

In December 2021, Chaldal acquired the e-pharmacy startup BanglaMeds as part of its expansion into a direct-to-consumer pharmacy vertical.

== Achievement ==
In 2020 Chaldal was announced as the best e-commerce company of the year at Digital World 2020 for serving its customers loyally during the COVID-19 crisis. It was ranked ninth in the world's best 500 startups in 2015. The ranking was produced by Forbes Magazine's startup assister ‘Y Combinator’. It has also received The Daily Star E-Business Of The Year 2017. Its name comes up in FT/IFC Transformation Business Award 2018.

== Funding ==
Chaldal received a $5 million seed round in August 2015 from investors including 7percent Ventures, BAM Ventures, and Force Over Mass Capital. In October 2018, the company raised a $5.5 million Series A round led by the International Finance Corporation, with participation from IDLC Finance and Y Combinator. In September 2021, Chaldal raised $10 million in a Series C round led by Taavet Hinrikus, co-founder of Wise, along with Topia chief product officer Sten Tamkivi and Xploration Capital, with participation from Mir Group. Chaldal said it would use the funds to expand into 15 new cities and open 50 additional warehouses.

| Date of funding | Transaction Name | Number of Investors | Fund Raised |
|---|---|---|---|
| Jun 26, 2024 | Series C | Bangladesh Venture Capital | US$170K |
| Aug 23, 2022 | Series C | Startup Bangladesh | Undisclosed |
| Sep 15, 2021 | Series C | Taavet Hinrikus, Xploration Capital, and 2 more | US$10M |
