= MyGate =

Society ERP

Mygate
- Type: Private
- Industry: Informational technology & services
- Founded: 2016
- Headquarters: Bangalore, Karnataka, India
- Key people: Vijay Arisetty (Co-founder, Chairman); Abhishek Kumar(Co-founder, CEO); Shreyans Daga (Co-founder, CPO)
- Products: Consumer services
- Number of employees: 1,550
- Parent: Vivish Technologies
- Website: mygate.com

Mygate is full stack society ERP created to manage security, finances and community living in housing societies. The app was launched in 2016, and as of November 2021, it claimed to serve over 30,000 housing societies across many cities in India. Mygate is owned by Vivish Technologies and headquartered in Bangalore.

== History ==
The app Mygate was first launched in Bangalore in June 2016 by Vijay Arisetty, Abhishek Kumar, Shreyans Daga, and Vivaik Bhardwaj. It is owned and operated by Vivish Technologies, a company also based in Bangalore, India. The company received its initial round of funding in 2018, with a $2.5 million investment from Prime Venture and opened offices in seven cities. As of 2023, the app is used by 3.5 million homes across 25,000 societies.

In June 2021, the company launched Mygate Homes, a property search feature on their app, enabling users to buy, sell, and rent properties. Homes later expanded to include additional services like rental agreements, legal assistance, and property management. In August, the company had initiated a buyback program to buy back shares worth up to ₹37.2 crore. In 2021, the company entered the Community Omnicommerce market with the launch of Mygate Exclusives on its app, featuring a curated selection of household and essential products.

Mygate has laid off hundreds of employees since May 2021 owing to pandemic woes. In Feb 2023, Mygate laid off 30% of its staff, mainly mid-manager level and junior-level employees from ground operations and community engagement and other verticals. It had laid off a similar percentage of employees in an earlier round of layoffs in December 2022.

== Products ==
Mygate was created to manage security, finances, communication, resident grievances, facility management, accounting and other housing society operations. The app enables visitor control, home service finding, and access to real estate and peer-to-peer marketplaces.

== Personal Data Protection ==
Mygate implemented PDP in June 2020 to protect user privacy and give users control over their information. The bill enhances individual control over personal data, ensuring fair and lawful acquisition and specific usage purposes. Users have the right to access their stored information, including details on who viewed it, when, and for what reasons.

However, activities of Mygate are being questioned by its customers with doubts raised over privacy issues as they try out different concepts to stay afloat. As part of its monetising strategy, Mygate has allowed thousands of brands in India to target its App users who are well-off families living behind gated communities.

== Lawsuits ==
In June 2020 Business Standard reported that Mygate and competitor NoBroker had filed competing lawsuits each charging the other with theft of proprietary customer data.

== Funding ==
Mygate has raised a total of $67.2 million in funding over three rounds.

In January 2018, as part of a seed round of funding, the company received $2.5 million for its technology platform. The funding round was led by a Bangalore-based seed fund Prime Venture Partners (PVP).

In October 2018, as part of a Series A round of funding, the company raised 65 crores from Prime Venture Partners.

In October 2019, as part of a Series B round of financing, the company received $56 million from Tiger Global Management, Tencent Holdings, JS Capital and existing investor PVP.

In November 2022, Mygate raised Rs 100 crore from Urban Company and Acko.

== Acquisitions ==
In December 2021, Mygate acquired MyCommunity Genie, a Bengaluru-based social commerce platform, for an undisclosed sum.

== See also ==
- List of Indian IT companies
- Urban Company
