= Slava Bocharov =

Russian businessman

- Born: 1979; Ordzhonikidze, USSR
- Education: Military Institute of Finance and Economics (2001)
- Occupation(s): executive, entrepreneur
- Years active: 2002—present
- Organizations: Samokat; Magnit

Slava Bocharov (born 1979 in Ordzhonikidze, USSR) is a retail executive and entrepreneur, former deputy CEO of Magnit, the creator of Magnit Cosmetics branch. The founder of Samokat and Byuk dark store rapid delivery services.

== Biography ==
=== Early years ===
Slava Bocharov was born in 1979 in Ordzhonikidze (currently Vladikavkaz). In 2001, he graduated from the Yaroslavl Military Institute of Finance and Economics with a degree in Finance and Credit. In 2002, he got a job at Magnit and built a career from a store manager to a C-level executive in less than 15 years.

=== Magnit ===
Bocharov became a store manager at Magnit in 2002 and was promoted to regional manager in a few years. In 2009, he became the Chief Logistics Officer of the whole retail chain. In 2010, Bocharov established and headed the Magnit Cosmetics branch before being appointed as the head of the convenience store branch, Magnit core store format, in 2011. In four years, the convenience store branch grew from 5300 stores in 2011 to 8800 stores totaling 75% of company revenue in 2015.

In 2015, Bocharov temporarily took the role of the deputy CEO of the Russian Post, responsible for the operational management and post offices efficiency improvement, but soon was invited back to Magnit by its founder Sergey Galitsky to take the role of the Chief Officer of Marketing and Development.

== Entrepreneurship ==
=== Samokat ===
In 2017, Bocharov joined Rodion Shishkov's startup Smart.Space that improved service convenience in business centers and housing estates. Among other services, it provided a rapid delivery of grocery and consumer goods under the name Magazinchik (Russian: a small shop). Soon, it was split into a separate company Samokat, which became the first dark store delivery service and the fastest-growing food tech company in Russia.

Bocharov was responsible for the strategic development and operational management of the venture. Samokat developed a complex technological backend for demand forecasting and delivery control and became the world's second dark story delivery startup to promise a 15-minute delivery (after Getir). By 2021, Samokat handled up to 900,000 deliveries monthly. In April 2020, Sberbank and the Mail.ru Group acquired 75.6% of Samokat. The founders and the company management retained control of a 24.4% share.

=== Buyk ===
Following the success of Samokat in Russia, Bocharov and Shishkov launched a US-based dark store delivery company Buyk, which employed Samokat's technological backend. In 2021, it began operations in New York City and Chicago with a plan to expand to Boston, Houston, and Miami through 2022. Buyk got funding from Fort Ross Ventures and Lev Leviev's LVL1 venture fund. Until November 2021, Bocharov was the CEO of Buyk and continued overseeing the company strategy and fundraising later.

By the time Russia launched the full-scale invasion into Ukraine, Buyk was between the funding rounds and fully dependent on bridge financing from its founders. On March 17, 2022, the company filed for bankruptcy.
