= Contrary (venture capital firm) =

American venture capital firm

- Type: Private
- Industry: Venture Capital
- Founded: 2016
- Founder: Eric Tarczynski
- Headquarters: San Francisco, California, United States
- Key people: Kyle Harrison, Will Robbins
- Products: Investments
- AUM: US $250 million
- Website: contrary.com

Contrary is a San Francisco-based venture capital firm. Formed in 2016, the firm invests across early stage companies in North America and India. Select investments from the firm include DoorDash, Anduril, Ramp, and Zepto.

== Background ==
The firm was founded by Eric Tarczynski in 2016. For his work founding Contrary, Tarczynski was awarded the Forbes 30 Under 30 honor in the Venture Capital category.

Investors in Contrary include: Tesla co-founder Martin Eberhard, Reddit co-founder Steve Huffman, Twitch co-founder Emmett Shear, Twitter ex-CEO Parag Agrawal, Meta Chief Product Officer Chris Cox, and GitHub COO Erica Brescia.

== Investments ==
Contrary's current investments include DoorDash, Anduril, Armada, Ramp, Vise, Kyte, Maev, Check, Stytch, Hallow, Parfait, and Zepto, among others.

In July 2020, the firm announced Contrary Talent, a network of engineers, designers, product managers, and operators. The network supports members through job opportunities, career development, and funding should they start a company.

In July 2020, Contrary made the first investment in Zepto, a grocery delivery company based in India. Zepto has since raised $560 million, including funding from Y Combinator and Breyer Capital.

In October 2021, Contrary announced a $20 million Fund II. In March 2022, Contrary announced that the firm had closed a $75 million Fund III.
