= Q-commerce =

E-commerce focused on rapid delivery

Q-commerce, also referred to as quick commerce, is a type of e-commerce where emphasis is on quick deliveries, typically in less than an hour. Q-commerce originally started with food delivery and it still represents the largest chunk of the business. It has quickly expanded to other categories particularly for grocery delivery, medicines, gifts, and apparel.

In early 2020, the restrictions imposed due to COVID-19 pandemic began to give a major boost to q-commerce as it allowed retailers to remain operational via quick home deliveries. At the time, it was speculated that prolonged restrictions would result in a long-term consumer behavior shift towards quick deliveries, establishing q-commerce as "the third generation of commerce". However, as pandemic restrictions began to lift and a burgeoning cost of living crisis made paying higher prices for rapid delivery less sustainable, demand for q-commerce in many parts of the world waned, causing businesses to downsize or fold altogether.

Companies in q-commerce include Amazon Now Flipkart Minutes Meituan, Gojek, Grab, Delivery Hero, PedidosYa, Glovo, BigBasket, Blinkit, Swiggy, Rappi, GoPuff, Instacart, JioMart, Zepto, Postmates,Chaldal, Flink and Dupizo.

== History ==
Rapid delivery of online purchases as a concept dates back to the late 1990s and early 2000s, with several dot-com companies springing up to promise rapid delivery in under one hour, although they tended to struggle with finding a sustainable business model.

One notable example was Kozmo.com, a venture capital-funded company promising free one-hour delivery of a range of items including videos, games, food, and other "basics", founded in 1998. The company went out of business in 2001. Other early examples include Urbanfetch, which delivered products by bike messenger in under an hour in parts of Manhattan and London, and Webvan, which delivered products to customers in the United States in a 30-minute window of their choosing.Rivals Kozmo and Urbanfetch went out of business after losses mounted and the business model was considered unviable.

In 2013, Grofers started 90-minute delivery of groceries.

Deliveries of necessities are intended to be provided as quickly as possible; they can occasionally arrive in a matter of minutes. Initially, delivery time hovered around 60 minutes but by 2019 several companies started local warehouses (cloud stores or dark stores) to drive delivery times down below 20 minutes.

== Global trends ==
The rapidly growing category offers a large selection of products at any time of day and in particular targets single-person households. It is currently estimated that the q-commerce market is $300 million and is expected to grow 10 to 15 times over the next five years to touch $5 billion.

In India, quick commerce saw increased adoption in 2023. Quick commerce orders made up about 40% to 50% of the country's online grocery expenditures in 2024. With delivery times of less than ten minutes, q-commerce purchases in India also expanded to high-end goods. Orders on Instamart and Blinkit increased from ₹30,000 crore (US$3.1 billion) in 2024 to ₹64,000 crore (US$6.6 billion) in 2025.
