= Gig economy =

Economic system of freelance workers

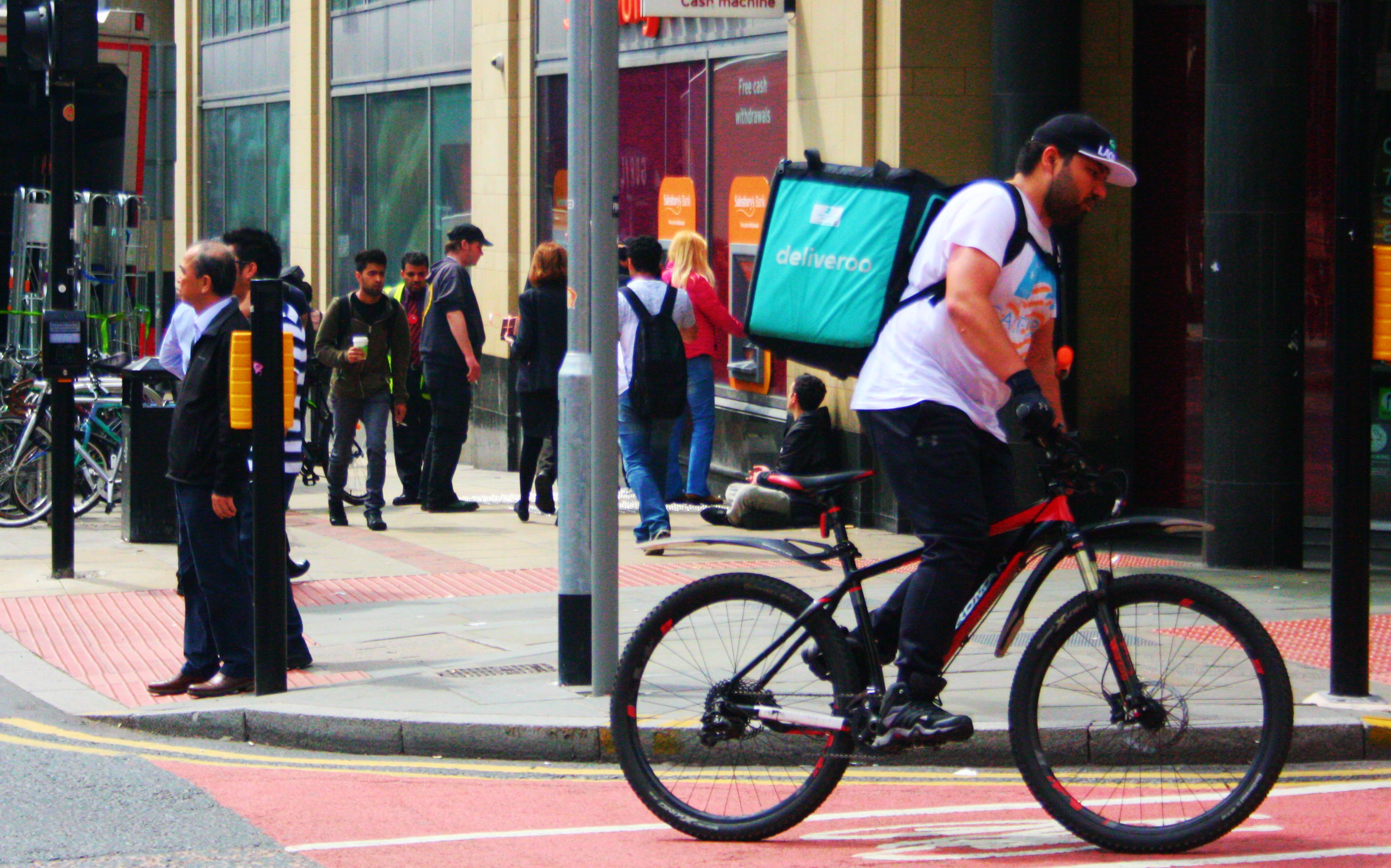
A gig worker transporting Deliveroo food.

The gig economy is the economic system by which a workforce of people (known as gig workers) engage in freelance or side-employment by corporate entities. This sector of the economy, which is now often performed through digital platforms, has been on the rise in the 21st century.

== Definition ==
The phrase "gig economy" gained popularity in the early 21st century as internet platforms facilitated the connection between workers and temporary employment opportunities in a more structured and scalable manner. The word "gig" originally referred to artists and performers engaged in short-term performance roles, but it has since broadened to encompass various labour arrangements across several sectors. Instead of being paid a regular salary, gig workers are paid for individual gigs performed.

While the definition varies, the gig economy is mainly defined as a labor market with short-term, flexible work arrangements, primarily through digital platforms that connect service providers with customers for different types of tasks or jobs, rather than traditional long-term employment. Gig workers are typically classified as independent contractors, without the benefits or job security associated with standard employment.

Corporate entities employ the services of the workers for short-term commitments for temporary work assignments. They are often able to provide a different type of service or product because the gig business model does not burden them with costs such as sick leave and health insurance benefits as well as office space, equipment and training. Sometimes this enables them to hire expertise that they could not otherwise afford. Workers often enjoy greater flexibility in terms of scheduling control and work-life balance.

== Description ==
Gig workers may have professional, semiprofessional or minimal qualifications for their employment.

In the design industry, gig workers are increasingly seeking legal protections around intellectual property (IP) and contract terms. Freelancers often face challenges with clients claiming ownership over creative work without proper compensation or acknowledgment. A 2022 survey conducted by Freelancers Union in partnership with the Authors Guild and other organizations found that 62% of freelancers in New York had experienced wage theft at least once in their careers, with 53% reporting losses of up to $10,000 from nonpayment. Legal developments like California's AB5 law continue to influence the gig economy, aiming to reclassify some design freelancers as employees, ensuring legal protections like minimum wage and benefits.

Among the common types of digital platforms in the gig economy are those which provide ridesharing services, food- or package-delivery services, crafts and handmade-item marketplaces, on-demand labor and repair services, property and space rentals. A 2016 study by Lawrence Katz and Alan Krueger found a 50 percent increase in the number of gig workers, freelancers, and independent contractors between 2005 and 2015. These jobs accounted for 94 percent of all employment growth in the United States during that period. As of 2021, 16% of adults in the United States had earned income through the gig economy, with younger demographics reporting higher levels of participation, according to the Pew Research Center. As of 2017, 55 million Americans contributed services to the gig economy. As of 2018, 150 million people were active in the gig economy in North America and Western Europe, according the Harvard Business Review.

The size of the gig economy depends on how one defines it and whose statistics one uses. The Bureau of Labor Statistics uses the term "electronically mediated work" to represent "short jobs or tasks that workers find through websites or mobile apps that both connect them with customers and arrange payment for the tasks." A work published in September 2018 determined that such work accounted for 1.0 percent of total employment in May 2017. At about the same time the Government Accountability Office stated that the definition and the data source variations support claims from below 5% to over one-third of the labor force engage in non-traditional employment. According to a 2021 Forbes article the gig economy was a $1 trillion sector of the United States economy.

Regardless of the definition used, the gig economy is growing. CNBC reported that during the 2010s, the gig economy grew by 15%. Forbes describes the growth as "slow and steady".

As of November 2022 the 10 largest gig-economy companies by market capitalization included Intuit (tax preparation software), PayPal (online payments), Airbnb (hosting marketplace), Uber (ride-sharing) and Shopify (e-commerce). Other leading companies include Lyft, OnlyFans (content-subscription service), DoorDash, and Instacart.

== Categories of gig employment ==
The gig economy includes various types of work, ranging from low-skill, task-oriented labour to high-skill professional services. The primary categories of gig labor include:

=== Services upon request ===
On-demand service platforms link clients with workers who provide prompt or near-instantaneous services. Examples include:

- Ride-sharing: Services such as Uber and Lyft connect drivers with customers requiring transportation.
- Delivery services: Platforms such as DoorDash, Postmates, and Uber Eats facilitate the delivery of food, groceries, and other products.
- Personal services: Platforms such as TaskRabbit connect workers with people who need help with domestic tasks, such as cleaning, moving, or furniture assembly.

=== Freelancing and contractual work ===
Freelancing involves independent professionals providing their skills on a project or task basis. Examples include:

- Creative and digital services: Freelancers provide services such as graphic design, web development, writing, and digital marketing through platforms such as Upwork, Fiverr, and Freelancer.
- Consulting and professional services: Highly skilled professionals, such as management consultants, software developers, and legal advisers, often undertake contract work for multiple clients rather than holding full-time positions.

=== Asset-dependent gig employment ===
Some gig workers use their own assets to generate income. This includes:

- Residential rentals: Platforms such as Airbnb enable people to rent out their residences or available rooms to travelers.
- Car rentals: Platforms such as Turo enable people to rent out their vehicles to others when they are not using them.

== New flexibilities ==
Many factors can contribute to productive work, and employers seek to highlight those aspects of work that are most attractive to a highly competitive and mobile workforce. Traditional workers have a long-term employer-employee relationship in which the worker is paid by the hour or year, earning a salary or wage.

The other workers are in temporary work or hired for the duration of a project, to perform a particular task, or for a certain period of time.

The intermediation of platforms between companies and workers reduces the entry and operating costs for providers and allows workers to participate more discontinuously in the markets (i.e., they have greater flexibility around working hours). On the other hand, the high availability of the worker, once connected, is demanded by the platforms, and it is unpaid waiting time because it is not part of the actual task.

Freelancers sell their skills to maximize their freedom, while full-time employees use the platforms to enhance their skills.

== Demographics ==
=== United States ===
16% of adults in the United States say that they have done any type of gig work. Hispanic Americans are the largest group in the gig economy with around 30% of Hispanics saying they have done some type of gig work. Black Americans are 20%, Asian Americans 19%, and White Americans are 12%.

=== India ===
India has one of the fastest-growing gig economies in the world, driven by rapid smartphone penetration, a large young working-age population, and the expansion of digital platforms. According to a 2022 report by NITI Aayog, India's gig workforce stood at approximately 7.7 million workers in 2020–21 and is projected to reach 23.5 million by 2029–30, representing around 6.7% of the non-agricultural workforce.

India's gig economy is broadly divided into two categories. The first comprises transport and delivery work, including ride-hailing through platforms such as Ola and Uber, and food delivery through Swiggy and Zomato. The second comprises sales and distribution work, where gig workers act as on-ground agents for banks, financial institutions, and consumer internet companies, completing tasks such as merchant onboarding, credit card sales, and savings account acquisition on a per-task commission basis.

The COVID-19 pandemic accelerated adoption of gig-based work, as reverse migration from cities to smaller towns created a supply of workers in Tier-2 and Tier-3 locations, while demand from digital companies for scalable, low-cost customer acquisition grew simultaneously. Additionally, e-commerce platforms such as eBay and Alibaba have provided small businesses and manufacturers with access to international markets, enabling them to participate in cross-border online trade.

=== Regulation ===
India's Code on Social Security, 2020 was the first legislative framework to formally define gig workers and platform workers, and to extend limited social security protections to them. Under Section 2(35) of the Code, a gig worker is defined as "a person who performs work or participates in a work arrangement and earns from such activities outside of traditional employer-employee relationship." The Code mandated a Social Security Fund under Section 109, with aggregator platforms required to contribute 1–2% of annual turnover toward worker welfare, subject to government notification."The Code on Social Security, 2020" (PDF). Ministry of Labour and Employment, Government of India.

The Union Budget 2025–26 announced additional measures including identity cards for gig workers and nationwide registration drives to extend social security coverage to the sector.

=== Notable platforms ===
Prominent gig economy platforms operating in India include Swiggy and Zomato in food delivery, Ola and Uber in ride-hailing, Urban Company in home services, and platforms such as PickMyWork in sales distribution and fintech customer acquisition.

== Expansion ==
Continuous technological advancements have the potential to expand the scope of the gig economy. Online technology has enabled new forms of work.

The gig economy is not an isolated trend but is linked to major changes in the economy. Advances in globalization and technology have driven companies to react quickly to market changes. The availability of labor through non-traditional arrangements such as gig work allows companies to rapidly adjust their workforce sizes. This can help companies increase their profits. From this perspective, gig work, which is unconventional, is a fundamental component of today's economy and is unlikely to disappear anytime soon.

According to a 2017 US report, over the past 20 years, the number of gig workers has increased.

With a 45 % increase in self-employment between 2004 and 2015 in Europe and an economy struggling to create salaried jobs, the gig economy appears to some as the future of work.

In ten years, the number of collaborative platforms has increased fivefold, with the creation of numerous associated jobs.

== See also ==
- List of gig economy companies
- Sharing economy
- Platform economy
- Precariat
