= Caseable =

International e-commerce company

caseable
- Company type: LLC
- Founded: 2010
- Headquarters: Brooklyn, United States
- Area served: Worldwide
- Founders: Klaus Wegener, Marvin Amberg
- Key people: Klaus Wegener
- Industry: Internet, E-commerce
- Website: www.caseable.com
- Launched: 2010

caseable is an international e-commerce company that specializes in customized design of cases and covers for electronic devices, such as smartphones, laptops, e-readers and tablets. The company is based in Lauterbach (Germany) and has offices in Brooklyn and Berlin; it has expanded from the USA and Germany to Canada, the UK, Netherlands, France, Austria, Switzerland, Australia and Russia. As of November 2013, the company has approximately 50 employees worldwide.

== History ==
caseable was founded in New York in March 2010 by Klaus Wegener and Marvin Amberg, who know each other from university. From 2011 to 2012 the company grew by 400%. In 2012 a German production site was opened in Lauterbach in addition to the American one in Brooklyn.

caseable initially offered customized designs for laptop sleeves, but then expanded its product portfolio to smartphone cases, e-reader and tablet covers. Shortly after its foundation caseable began operations in Canada and across Europe. The company opened online retail sites in the UK, Netherlands, France, Austria and Switzerland. In 2013 caseable launched in both Russia and Australia and partnered with Zazzle, which produces the fabric for the iPad cases. In Russia caseable is the first supplier of customized cases and covers for electronic devices.

The products use recycled materials, and the Lauterbach facility operates entirely on hydro water power.

== See also ==
- E-commerce
- Online shopping
