= Samokat =

Russian express delivery service for food and household goods

- Native name: Самокат
- Formerly: Magazinchik (Russian: Magazinchik)
- Type: private company
- Industry: e-grocery
- Founded: 2017; 9 years ago in Saint Petersburg, Russia
- Founder: Rodion Shishkov, Slava Bocharov
- Headquarters: 11a Sedova St., Saint Petersburg, Russia
- Number of locations: around 1100 dark stores (2022)
- Area served: 49 cities of Russia
- Services: rapid delivery from dark stores
- Revenue: 42,4 billion rubles (2021)
- Number of employees: 30,000 (2021)
- Website: samokat.ru

Samokat ("kick scooter") is a Russian dark store rapid delivery service for food and household goods. Founded in 2017, it was the first dark store operator in the country. By 2022, Samokat owned around 1,100 dark stores in 49 cities and handled 35% of dark store deliveries Russia-wide.

== History ==
Samokat was founded by former Yota and Russian Post executive, Rodion Shishkov, and Magnit deputy CEO, Slava Bocharov. The two business partners were introduced in the early 2010s by Ilya Oskolkov-Tsentsiper and cooperated on the digital transformation of the Russian Post. They first used the dark store delivery model in the 2017 project Smart.Space that improved service convenience in business centers and housing estates and offered a 15-minute delivery of a limited variety of food and household goods through its app storefront Magazinchik (Russian: a small shop). In late 2017, Magazinchik was split into a separate app (and renamed 'Samokat' in April 2019), which became the first specialized rapid delivery service in Russia.

With USD 2.5 million in funding from founders and private investors, by the end of 2018, the company grew to 5 dark stores in Saint Petersburg, which handled 8,000 deliveries monthly. In June 2019, Samokat received a USD 10 million investment from PIK Group's investment branch PIK Investments, which allowed the company to start operations in Moscow and open 70 more dark stores. By the end of 2019, Samokat made over 100,000 deliveries each week. The rapid delivery market skyrocketed during the COVID-19 pandemic: by May 2020, Samokat reached 1 million monthly deliveries, outplacing other delivery apps and traditional retailers offering delivery services. Meanwhile, in April 2020, a joint venture of Mail.ru Group and Sberbank acquired a 75.6% share in Samokat. Through 2020 to 2022, the company expanded operations to 39 cities and opened up to 1000 dark stores.

=== Buyk ===
Following the success of Samokat in Russia, Shishkov and Bocharov launched a US-based dark store delivery company Buyk, which used parts of Samokat's technological backend. The venture was supported by Fort Ross Ventures and Lev Leviev's LVL1 venture fund. Buyk began operations in New York City in September 2021 and in Chicago in December 2021. By the time Russia launched the full-scale invasion into Ukraine, Buyk was between the funding rounds and fully dependent on bridge financing from its founders. On March 17, 2022, the company filed for bankruptcy.

== Business model ==
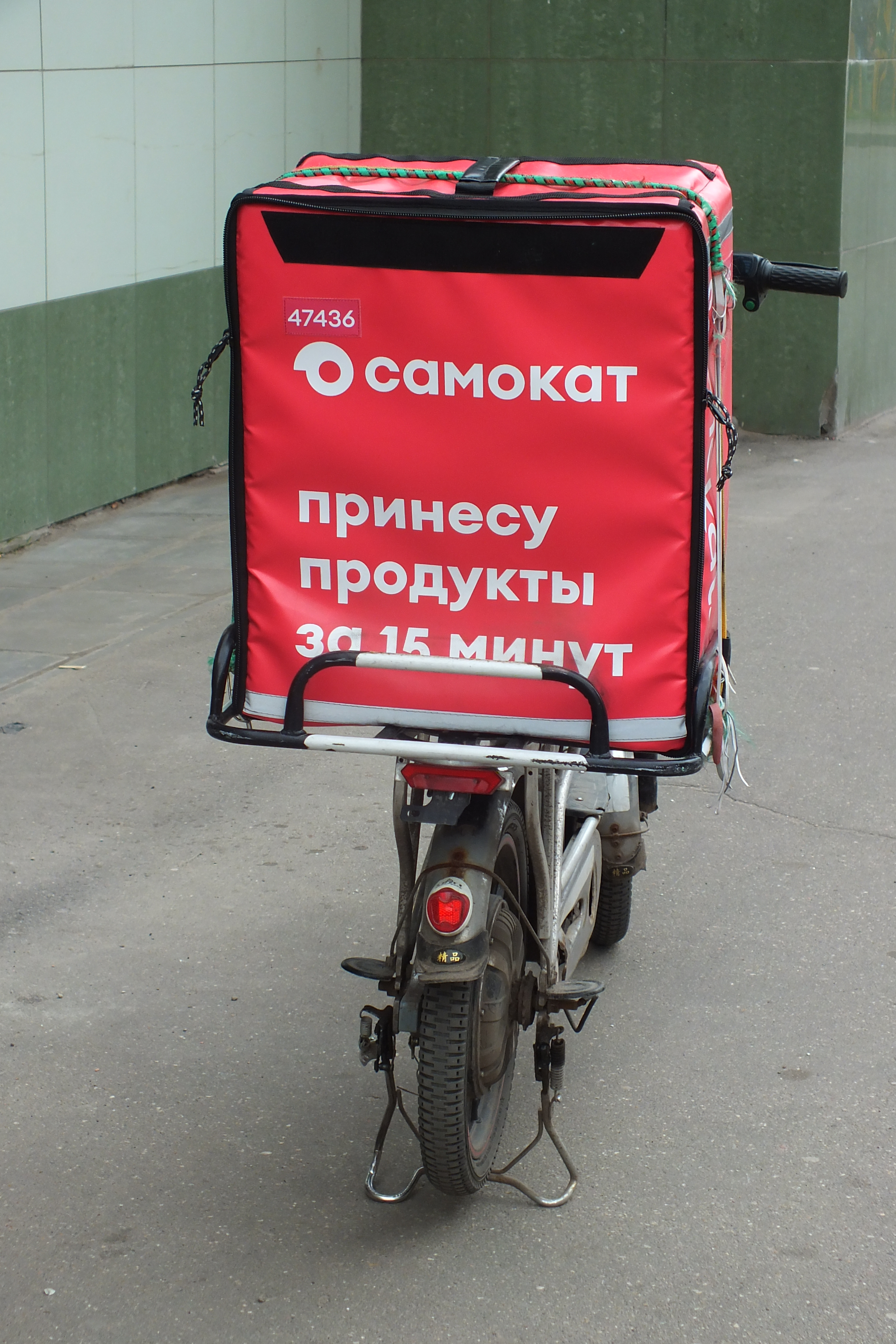
Samokat in Brateyevo District in Moscow

Samokat operates a network of dark stores (from 180 to 220 m^{2}) in densely populated areas. The average operational radius of dark stores is 1.5 km, which allows delivery of orders within 15 or 30 minutes (depending on local circumstances). The orders are made in the mobile apps, packaged by the dark store staff, and delivered by bicycle couriers. In 2022, the company opened several big dark stores (up to 450 m^{2}) in Moscow and Saint Petersburg to deliver small wholesale orders.

Samokat offers the same goods as convenience stores: grocery, pastry, meat, vegetables, household goods, baby items, and pet food. By 2022, the company offered around 800 private-label SKUs, including gluten-free and alternative foods, which totaled 20% of revenue. In 2022, Samokat partnered with the Russian Association of Alternative Foods to expand its line of vegetarian products with alternative meat, fish, meat preparations, and pastry made without animal products.

Regular dark stores provide 2,500 SKUs, big dark stores offer 1,000 SKUs of wholesale goods. Samokat also delivers of a wider variety of goods from its large warehouses with 5,000 SKUs through the dark stores in a couple of hours. In 2022, the company launched a separate online storefront with over 7,000 SKUs of beauty products and a social media for beauty professionals.

Samokat's technological backend includes a store management system (which monitors goods remains and expiry dates and helps dark stores' staff to package orders), a load prediction system that calculates the number of future orders based on customer behavior and other factors (such as weather and road works), and a delivery control system to manage a large distributed network of couriers.

== Company ==
Samokat is controlled by the e-commerce-focused O2O Holding, partially owned by Sberbank (which has a share below 50%). Shishkov, Bocharov, and the company's top management hold minority shares.

By 2022, Samokat operated 1092 dark stores (+120% year-on-year growth) in 49 Russian cities, being the largest dark store network in Europe (and the US), outplaced only by its Chinese counterpart Missfresh. As of December 2022, it employed over 30,000 people, including staff and independent contractors, as couriers.

In 2021, Samokat delivered 70 million orders (+300% compared to 2020). In August 2022 alone, Samokat made 10.5 million deliveries (15% of 2021 results), effectively handling around 35% of all rapid deliveries in Russia. According to the reports, in 2021, Samokat scored a revenue of 42.4 billion rubles (+320% year-on-year growth).
