= Urban Company =

Indian home service company

- Formerly: UrbanClap
- Type: Public
- Traded as: NSE: URBANCO; BSE: 544999
- Industry: Services; Consumer electronics
- Founded: November 2014; 11 years ago
- Founders: Abhiraj Singh Bhal; Varun Khaitan; Raghav Chandra
- Headquarters: Gurgaon, Haryana, India
- Area served: India; UAE; Singapore; Saudi Arabia
- Services: Home improvement Handyman; Beauty salon Home appliances
- Revenue: ▲₹1,144 crore (US$120 million) (FY25)
- Net income: ▲₹240 crore (US$25 million) (FY25)
- Website: urbancompany.com

Urban Company Limited, formerly known as UrbanClap, is an Indian multinational company that operates an online platform for booking home and personal services. The company was founded in 2014 by Abhiraj Singh Bhal, Varun Khaitan, and Raghav Chandra and is headquartered in Gurgaon, Haryana. In January 2020, the company changed its name from UrbanClap to Urban Company.

== History ==
UrbanClap was founded in October 2014 by Abhiraj Singh Bhal, Varun Khaitan, and Raghav Chandra. The company was created to serve the home services market, initially focusing on providing beauty services at home.

In 2016, it acquired GoodService, a hyperlocal concierge app and HandyHome, a home appliance repair company.

In January 2020, the company rebranded from UrbanClap to Urban Company, and extended its services to Australia, Singapore, and the UAE. In 2021, Urban Company became a unicorn after raising $188 million in a funding round led by Prosus. The company was valued at $2.8 billion in December 2021 after an ESOP sale.

In December 2022, Urban Company signed an agreement with the National Skill Development Corporation to train and certify unskilled workers across various service categories.

By 2023, the company launched operations in the United States, servicing New York City, Dallas, and Austin. In late 2023, Urban Company ventured into the branded products segment with the launch of smart RO water purifiers under its 'Native' sub-brand.

In April 2024, Urban Company partnered with Saudi Manpower Solutions Company to launch Waed Khadmat Al-Munzal for Marketing Co., a joint venture to provide home services in Saudi Arabia.

In March 2025, Urban Company launched Insta Maids (later rebranded to Insta Help), a quick e-commerce service offering on-demand domestic help within 15 minutes in select areas of Mumbai. As of March 2025, Urban Company reported having approximately 40,000 registered professionals globally.

On 17 September 2025, Urban Company was listed on the NSE and BSE after an initial public offering (IPO). The promoter group, comprising Abhiraj Singh Bhal, Varun Khaitan and Raghav Chandra, held about a 20% stake after the IPO.

== Funding ==
The company raised seed funding of $1 million in January 2015 from Accel Partners and SAIF Partners. It raised a Series A investment of $10 million from SAIF Partners and Accel Partners. The company also received an undisclosed amount of funding from Ratan Tata in December 2015.

It then raised $25 million in a Series B round that was led by Bessemer Venture Partners, with participation from returning investors SAIF and Accel Partners.

In 2018, the company raised $50 million in a Series D round led by Steadview Capital and existing investor Vy Capital.

In a Series E round led by Tiger Global, the company raised $75 million, with existing investors Steadview Capital and Vy Capital also participating in the round.

In June 2021, Urban Company raised US$255 million in a Series F funding round led by new investors Prosus Ventures, Dragoneer, and Wellington Management, with participation from existing investors Vy Capital, Tiger Global, and Steadview Capital, at a valuation of $2.1 billion.

In July 2024, Urban Company raised $50 million from Dharana Capital through a secondary transaction, in which Dharana Capital purchased shares from employees and other shareholders.

== Reception ==
In June 2023, a report revealed that beauticians associated with Urban Company were required to pay for training before they can begin working on the platform. Several gig workers stated that Urban Company was temporarily and permanently blocking their IDs due to booking cancellations, taking leave from work for two to three days, and a decline in user rating.

In June 2024, Urban Company's beauty segment workers staged protests in Bengaluru over ID blocking, and highlighted issues with the 'auto assign' features, ID blocking and costly grievance remedy. The Gig and Platform Services Workers Union (GIPSWU) said that the protest was against the new work conditions, which were termed "horrific" and forced "thousands of partners to work under slavery like situations." Abhiraj Singh Bhal defended the company's new policies that penalised gig workers for low user rating and claimed that "local politicians and unions often exploit these disagreements to exert pressure on the company."

According to the Fairwork India 2024 report, Urban Company and BigBasket were the only two gig economy companies with a minimum wage policy. A 2024 Al Jazeera report criticised the company for burdening its gig workers with multiple qualifying fees, compulsory product purchases, and frequent account blockings.

== Controversies ==
In January 2025, Urban Company filed a petition in the Delhi High Court against Kent RO Systems, stating that its Native-branded water purifiers were delisted from Amazon and Flipkart following patent infringement complaints by Kent. The company argued that this removal, which occurred without a court injunction, led to business losses and reputational impact during a peak sales period.

In March 2025, when the company launched a quick service offering for domestic help under the name "Insta Maids", labour rights groups and social media users raised concerns that the name undermined the dignity of domestic workers. The company subsequently rebranded the service to "Insta Help".

In July 2026, News18 reported that an Urban Company worker claimed her colleague was not allowed to use a customer's washroom after completing a long service. She was later given a one-star rating, which the worker said led to her being unable to receive bookings for five days. The incident raised concerns about how customer ratings can affect the income of gig workers.

In January 2026, NDTV reported that a woman in Mumbai accused an Urban Company masseuse of assault following the cancellation of a massage booking. Wadala police registered a case and began an investigation.

== CSR ==
In February 2024, Urban Company launched Project Nidar, a corporate social responsibility initiative that provides support services such as counseling, legal aid, emergency lodging, and financial assistance to service partners affected by domestic violence, in collaboration with NGOs. As part of this initiative, the company developed a formal policy against gender-based violence and partnered with the Invisible Scars Foundation to offer assistance to those in need.

In November 2024, the company partnered with NITI Aayog's Women Entrepreneurship Platform to launch a pilot program supporting women entrepreneurs in the beauty and wellness sector. The initiative provided training in skill development, legal compliance, finance, and business operations, with 25 participants selected from the Delhi NCR region.

== Awards and recognition ==
In March 2019, the company was awarded the Most Innovative Start-up of the Year by The Economic Times. Urban Company was named the Young Turks Startup of the Year at CNBC TV18's India Business Leadership Awards in March 2021.
