= NoBroker =

Indian proptech company

NoBroker Technologies Solutions
- Type: Private
- ISIN: INE08M103013
- Industry: Informational technology & services
- Founded: 2013
- Headquarters: Bangalore, Karnataka, India
- Key people: Akhil Gupta; Amit Kumar Agarwal; Saurabh Garg
- Products: Real-estate services, Consumer services
- Website: www.nobroker.in

NoBroker is an Indian proptech company that runs a real estate marketplace.

Contrary to its original motives, the company began charging property owners a subscription fee to access additional tenant data in Bengaluru and Chennai straying away from its no-brokerage policy.

== History ==
The company was founded in 2013 by Indian Institute of Technology alumni Akhil Gupta, Amit Kumar Agarwal, and Saurabh Garg as a real estate search portal connecting flat owners and tenants. In October 2015, the company expanded its operations to include the resale of properties. In November 2021, it became 36th unicorn in India for that year.

NoBroker's broker-free operation is based on consumer-to-consumer (C2C) marketplace model.

As of 2022, the company clocks more than 5,00,000 transactions yearly, and more than 75 lakh properties are registered on the portal. As of 2023, the company's services are available in Bangalore, Chennai, Delhi National Capital Region, Hyderabad, Mumbai, and Pune.

=== Products ===
- NoBrokerhood, a "gated-community" app for society management. By 2023, the application became a part of the Government of India's Open Network for Digital Commerce.
- CallZen.AI, a conversational intelligence tool.

== Funding ==
As of 2023, the company has secured a total of $361 million in funding from investors including Tiger Global Management, General Atlantic, Beenext, KTB Ventures, Moore Capital Management, Elevation Capital, Anand Chandrasekaran, Elevation Capital, Vijay Shekhar Sharma, and Google.

== Controversies ==
In late 2015, the Bengaluru office of the company experienced an assault orchestrated by over 40 local property agents and brokers. The group not only threatened the employees but also attempted to physically harm them. The brokers had to vacate the premises as staff called in local law enforcement for assistance.

In 2020, NoBroker initiated legal proceedings against MyGate, alleging that the latter unlawfully acquired NoBroker's exclusive customer database. MyGate was accused of reaching out to NoBrokerHood customers with the intention of promoting its services. Conversely, MyGate had alleged NoBroker of engaging in comparable data theft.

A 2024 report by The Ken revealed that the company has shifted from its original no-brokerage policy and has started charging property owners a subscription fee to access additional tenant data in Bengaluru and Chennai. That same year, the publication also reported that the company was involved in anti-competitive practices, attempting to force out competitors like MyGate from various residential communities by offering its society management application for free.

== Publications ==
=== Case studies ===
- Bajaj, Preeti (2017). "NoBroker: The Real Estate Disruptor". The Case Centre. New Delhi: Amity University.
- Ramakrishna, N (2020). "Technology Startups in Real Estate Broking: The Case of NoBroker". Portfolio Organiser. XVII (6). Pune: National Institute of Construction Management and Research: 25–31.
- Sinha, Diksha (April 2024). "The Evolution of PropTech in India: A Close Examination of NoBroker's Rise and Challenges" (Electronic resource). Open Access Cases. 1 (2). OAIster: n.p. ISSN 3067-0349 – via Stanford University Libraries.
