= Contactless dining =

Form of restaurant dining

Contactless dining is a restaurant dine-in experience that allows a guest to view the menu, place orders, and make payments without interacting closely with a server or touching shared public surfaces. The form of dining has emerged in global popularity during the COVID-19 pandemic.

It is enabled via technology such as near-field communication and QR codes, in which a restaurant customer scans a sticker to access the restaurant menu or payment system online.

While already commonplace in other countries such as China since 2013, contactless dining has only recently gained popularity in the more service-based restaurant industry of the US, in which low-wage hourly employees receive tips from customers based on their service.

Contactless dining has the benefits of quicker service, reducing contact between people, and higher margins from sales. By removing the manual ordering and billing system, the model also decreases pressure on servers, helps restaurants increase operational efficiency, and improves the dining experience for customers. This online ordering and payment system also allows customers to save their payment information and verify the accuracy of their order.

== History ==
In 2011, the Chinese payment platform Alipay launched a QR code payment method. In 2013, the Chinese mobile application WeChat enabled users to accept payment with QR codes. The feature only required vendors to print a QR code, which made the systems easy to adopt for restaurants. Restaurants could also enable customers to scan a QR code to order dishes directly through the menu on their phone. In 2016, more than 600,000 restaurants in China supported payments via the Alipay App. As of 2019, 93.2% of Chinese diners paid their restaurant bills through Alipay or WeChat Pay.

In the US, QR codes have been offered as a method of accessing restaurant menus or are printed onto receipts for guests to scan and access an online survey. Starbucks has deployed NFC-enabled machines for payments. However, a full system that enabled guests to place orders and make payments online while sitting at a restaurant table did not become more widely known until the COVID-19 pandemic in the US. The Centers for Disease Control and Prevention and other state restaurant associations encouraged the use of contactless payments and digital menus in their reopening guidelines for the pandemic.

In January 2020, Indian tech startup Digital Waiter launched a contactless dining service in multiple countries starting from India. In April, India-based food delivery start-up Zomato introduced a contactless dining service with menu-viewing, ordering, and payment functionality. In May 2020, PayPal introduced contactless QR codes for payment for a range of countries. Mobile ordering platform LevelUp partnered with point-of-sale provider Toast to accept QR codes for touchless pay in restaurants. In July 2020, Coca-Cola launched a contactless pouring option for its drink dispensers that was adopted by Wendy's and Five Guys. Small and medium-sized restaurants have since been experimenting with a range of similar systems to meet new public health guidelines.

== Technology and Use ==
Contactless dining typically consists of digitalized menus, ordering, and payments, which represent each step of the traditional dine-in experience in which a restaurant guest needs to interact with a server or item. Contactless dining systems can convert paper menus into QR code menus and also manage waitlists, as well as provide other services to restaurants. By speeding up the payment process, contactless payments allows for shorter meal durations and additional guests to be seated during busy periods.
