= Saudi Manpower Solutions Company =

Saudi human resources company

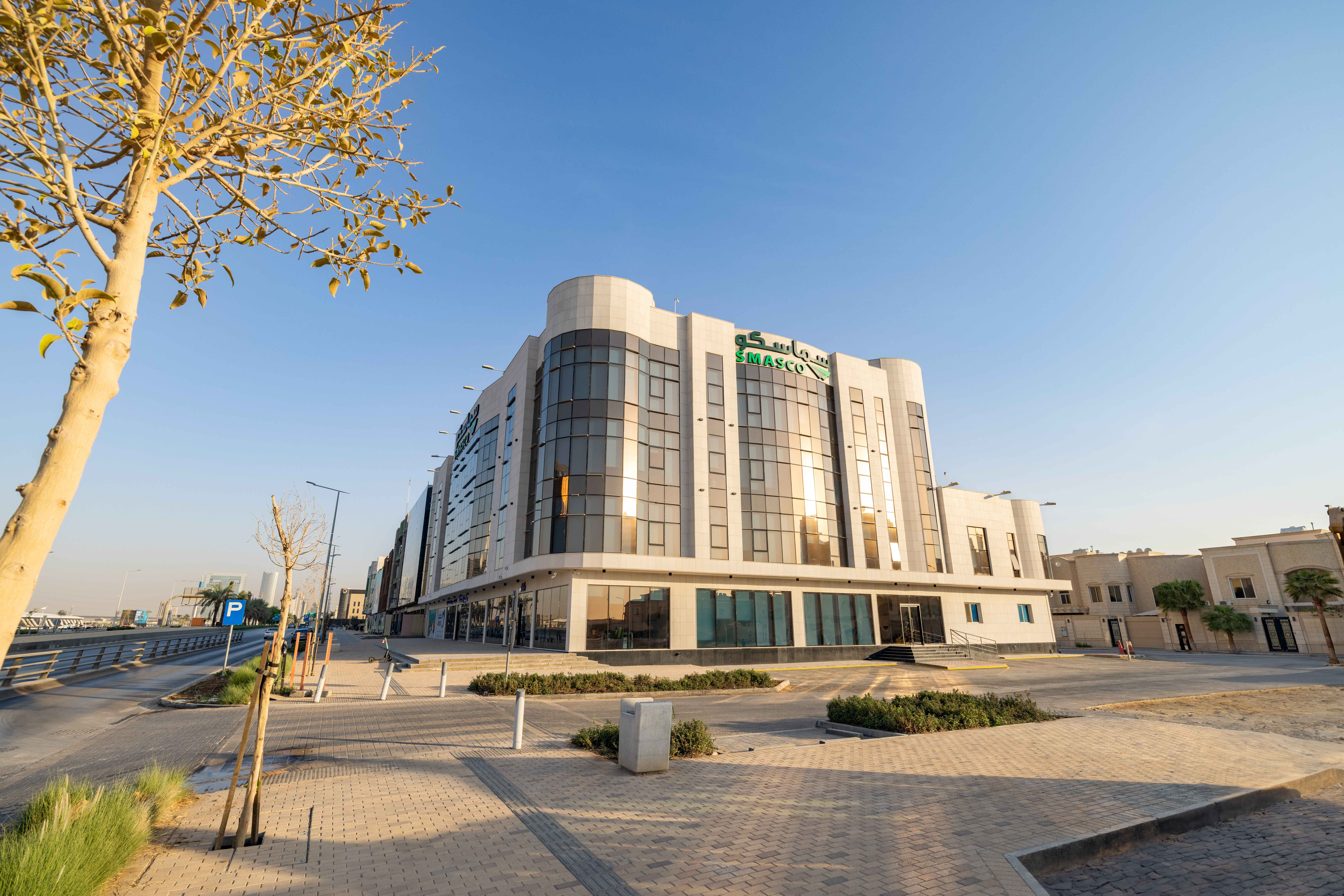
- SMASCO Headquarters in Riyadh, Saudi Arabia
- Native name: الشركة السعودية لحلول القوى البشرية
- Type: joint stock
- Traded as: Tadawul: 1834
- ISIN: SA562G3GSL11
- Industry: recruitment services, manpower solutions, outsourcing talents
- Founded: 2012; 14 years ago
- Headquarters: Riyadh, Saudi Arabia
- Area served: Saudi Arabia
- Key people: Abdullah Altimyat (CEO)
- Website: smasco.com

Saudi Manpower Solutions Company (SMASCO) (Arabic: الشركة السعودية لحلول القوى البشرية) is a Saudi joint stock human resources company headquartered in Riyadh, focusing on qualifying and employing expatriate workers while providing workforce solutions for both corporate and individual sectors.

The company has been listed on the Saudi Stock Exchange (Tadawul) since July 2024, and is recognized as the first company licensed for workforce solutions by the Saudi Ministry of Human Resources and Social Development. SMASCO's market share in the Saudi market ranges between 14% and 16% of the sectors it serves.

== History ==
SMASCO was established in 2012 as a human resources company with a fully paid-up capital of 100 million Saudi Riyals, which increased to 400 million Saudi Riyals ($106 million) by 2024. SMASCO is the first company to obtain a government license to provide labor services in Saudi Arabia.

In September 2013, SMASCO launched the Raha service, which provides domestic workers for a predetermined period through scheduled weekly visits, specifying a certain number of hours and days. In 2018, SMASCO achieved a Guinness World Record for hosting the largest domestic workers training workshop in the world. As of May 2024, SMASCO had attracted workers from 40 countries.

=== Subsidiaries ===
In 2019, SMASCO established the Saudi Logistics Services Company (SLSC), a logistics firm operating in Saudi Arabia. The following year, SMASCO launched Terhab, a company specializing in customer experience. Since 2021, SMASCO has owned Saneem, a Saudi company that invests in technology solutions.

== IPO ==
In March 2024, SMASCO obtained approval from the Saudi Capital Market Authority to register and launch an initial public offering (IPO) of shares on the Saudi Stock Exchange (Tadawul). In May 2024, SMASCO announced an IPO, offering 30% of the total shares, valued at 120 million SAR ($31,95 million), for public subscription to institutional and individual investors. The subscription period for individual investors began on May 26, 2024, and concluded on May 27, 2024. During this time, they subscribed to the full allocation of 12 million shares, representing 10% of the total shares offered, at 7.5 SAR per share. The number of individual participants in the subscription reached 1,065 million, resulting in a coverage rate of 13 times for the shares allocated to individuals. Each subscriber was allocated 10 shares, with a maximum limit of 2.5 million shares.

On July 12, 2024, SMASCO was listed on the main market index (TASI) under the trading code 1834 and the international code SA562G3GSL11. SMASCO's offering consists of 120 million shares, representing 30% of the company's capital, with 10% allocated to individual investors and 90% to institutional participants.
