= Kyte (company) =

San Francisco-based rental car company

- Industry: Car rental
- Founders: Ludwig Schoenack; Nikolaus Volk; Francesco Wiedemann
- Defunct: August 2025
- Headquarters: San Francisco, California, United States
- Number of employees: 100 (2023)
- Website: kyte.com

Kyte was a San Francisco, California-based rental car service that delivered cars directly to customers. In March 2023, it was operating in 14 cities across the United States and employed 100 people. Kyte shut down operations in August 2025.

== History ==
Kyte was founded in San Francisco in 2019 by Ludwig Schoenack, Nikolaus Volk and Francesco Wiedemann, all of whom are German immigrants to the United States. In January 2021, Kyte announced that they had raised $9 million from DN Capital and Amplo VC. In August 2021, Kyte began offering car rentals in Seattle, which became the company's eighth city in which it was operating. In March 2022, the company began operating in its fourteenth city, Portland, Oregon. That month, they also announced that they had raised a further $200 million from Goldman Sachs and Ares Management, and that they would use this money to add more vehicles to their fleet. In November 2022, the company announced that it had raised a further $60 million in a Series B venture round of fundraising. In December 2022, Kyte announced that it would offer subscriptions lasting for either three, six, or twelve months. These subscriptions serve as an alternative to shorter-term rentals. In 2025 Kyte faced losses in multiple markets. The company cut nearly half of its workforce. Kyte entered receivership in California and sold its customer list to Turo. This sudden closure left customers with reservations without a rental car and attempting to get refunds.
