= Urbanspoon =

Restaurant information and recommendation service

- Founded: 2006; 20 years ago
- Founders: Ethan Lowry; Adam Doppelt; Patrick O'Donnell
- Defunct: June 1, 2015
- Fate: Shut down as separate service, merged into parent operations
- Headquarters: Seattle, Washington, United States
- Area served: Australasia; Europe; North America
- Parent: InterActiveCorp (2009–2015); Zomato (from 2015)
- Subsidiaries: RezBook (2011–2013)

Urbanspoon was a restaurant information and recommendation service founded in 2006 by former Jobster employees that offered its services in North America and parts of English-speaking Australasia and Europe. In January 2015, Zomato, an India-based restaurant search and discovery service, acquired Urbanspoon.

The Urbanspoon website and Seattle business operation initially evolved with addition of content team workers for door-to-door data collection of restaurant information, an operational design that had served Zomato well in India. However, Zomato discontinued the Urbanspoon website on June 1, 2015, redirecting Urbanspoon traffic to Zomato servers; at the same time, Urbanspoon's logo was incorporated into a new Zomato logo.

Zomato had previously ceased Urbanspoon app development, leading to departure of all Seattle engineers by August 2015. Mid-October 2015, multiple U.S. Zomato (previously Urbanspoon) offices were closed, including the former corporate headquarters in Seattle. Business reports as of October 2015 indicate either that Zomato-Urbanspoon has ceased all U.S. operations, or that it will retain a couple of sites, including Dallas, the new site of Zomato's U.S. administrative functions.

== Services ==
Urbanspoon was a restaurant information and recommendation service that operated in the United States, Canada, Australia, and New Zealand, and in the United Kingdom and Ireland. It offered services via its website and standard apps for mobile operating systems. In its evolution from an initial and popular iPhone application, UrbanSpoon adapted its appearance and capabilities, including to the Android market. In these and other efforts to develop the product, the results were apps that were aware and competitive with alternative businesses Yelp and Where.

Via its apps and webpage, Urbanspoon offered a restaurant search utility, with filtering by price, type of food, neighborhood, nearby businesses (movie theaters, sports venues, etc.), and special features (gluten-free fare, child-friendliness, BYOB-service, etc.). Users could then participate in the simple "like" or "don't like" rating system to review restaurants, and share restaurant information with friends via email, Facebook, Google+, Twitter, and Pinterest, and by photo pages. Users who create an account could track dining experiences (menu items, price of meal, and photos), and could create a "Wishlist" to save restaurants for future use and a "Guide" to share personal lists of dining favorites. In addition, the Urbanspoon app featured a "Slot Machine," allowing users to "Spin" (or shake their device) to randomly see a new eating establishment based on neighborhood, cuisine, or price.

The Urbanspoon website evolved in response to the Zomato acquisition, adding content based on the work of new team workers doing door-to-door data collection of restaurant information (menus, hours, etc.), an operational design that had served Zomato well in India. Zomato discontinued operation of the Urbanspoon website on June 1, 2015 (redirecting Urbanspoon search traffic to Zomato website servers), and rolled out a new Zomato logo that incorporated the earlier logo of Urbanspoon; hence, as of this date, Urbanspoon services ceased to exist.

== Acquisitions overview ==
Urbanspoon was acquired from its former Jobster employees Ethan Lowry, Adam Doppelt, and Patrick O'Donnell by American media and internet business InterActiveCorp (IAC) in April 2009. It launched RezBook in 2011, an online reservation booking service for restaurants. OpenTable purchased the RezBook venture and capabilities from Urbanspoon for an undisclosed sum in 2013.

Urbanspoon was then acquired in an all-cash deal by Zomato, an Indian restaurant search and discovery service, in January 2015. Its location has been based since its inception in Seattle, Washington, where the company was founded.

== Operations after Zomato acquisition ==
Urbanspoon offered Zomato an annual user base estimated to be approximately 31 million in early 2015 based on app downloads, and a directory of >1 million restaurants; Zomato's intention, based on information from its CEO, Deepinder Goyal, as reported by John Cook of GeekWire, is to give the company "a nice footprint" as it expands in preparation to "battle industry heavyweight Yelp." Goyal is reported to have said: "'The biggest challenge and most fun part of this move, however, is the fight we're going to be picking with Yelp, … [i]n the market they have dominated for so long. After all, like Mark Twain famously said, it isn't the size of the dog in the fight, it's the size of the fight in the dog." Zomato reportedly will integrate the Urbanspoon app and Web site over the next few months [of early 2015], "meaning the Urbanspoon brand will be phased out." Goyal has further stated, as reported by The Seattle Times, that a result of the acquisition will likely be a downsizing of Urbanspoon in Seattle (by ≈10% of its employees), and "phase out its popular restaurant-finding app." Goyal has acknowledged that Urbanspoon was a valuable brand and that Zomato would lose brand equity in the short-term, but that uniformity of product was an aim, and that "to manage two brands within the same company" would be "harder for us [Zomato] in the longer term."

On June 1, 2015, Zomato discontinued the Urbanspoon website, redirecting Urbanspoon traffic to Zomato website servers; at the same time, a new Zomato logo incorporated the earlier logo of Urbanspoon. These visible changes came alongside Zomato's business decision to cease app development, which led 12 engineers (two-thirds of its Seattle engineering workforce at time of acquisition) to leave between January and August 2015; the remaining engineers were laid off on August 6. Further extensive cuts in the U.S. workforce were made in mid-October 2015, with the closing of multiple U.S. Zomato (previously Urbanspoon) offices, including the former corporate headquarters in Seattle. This layoff of the remainder of what was a workforce of 150 in the U.S., at San Francisco, Chicago, Denver, Dallas, Philadelphia, and New York offices, led former employees to report that the company has ceased all U.S. operations, with a Zomato source refining the report to say that some workers will be retained at a couple of sites, including Dallas, the new site of Zomato's U.S. administrative functions.

== See also ==
- List of websites about food and drink
