= Urbanfetch =

Online retail company

- Founded: 1999; 27 years ago
- Founder: Ross Stevens
- Defunct: 2000
- Website: www.urbanfetch.com

Urbanfetch, founded in 1999 and closed in 2000, was a dot-com company from which customers ordered products (DVDs, music, books, snacks, gifts, etc.) online and had them delivered by bike messenger in less than an hour within certain delivery areas covering most of Manhattan and London.

The company's business plan was essentially identical to that of Kozmo.com, which led to a lawsuit from them. Apparently, Urbanfetch founder Ross Stevens had been approached to fund Kozmo but instead launched a competing business with an identical business model. The suit was settled in December 1999.

Like Kozmo, Urbanfetch charged no delivery fee and sometimes offered significant discounts. It also gave away T-shirts and hats with each order when it first launched and provided warm cookies with each order. It ceased operations in October 2000. Its corporate delivery division was sold to Urban Express, a traditional courier service.

Urbanfetch became somewhat of a joke after an episode of The Daily Show parodied its business model to the Post Office.

Schmitt and Brown in their Build Your Own Garage (2010) conclude that the company “was buzz only and lacked a rigorous business model”.
