= Zomato =

Indian food delivery service

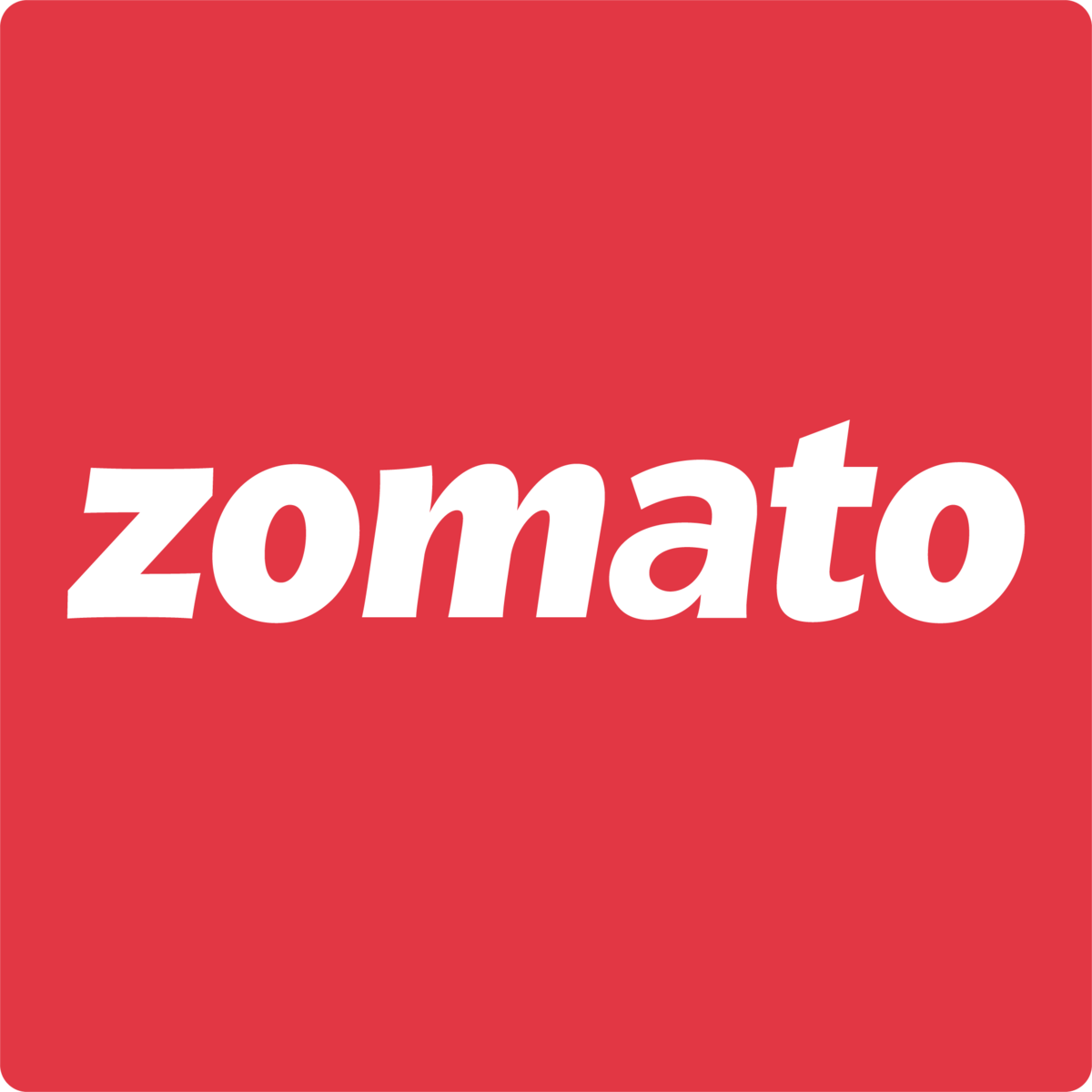
- Former name: Foodiebay (2008–2018)
- Website type: Online food ordering
- Founded: 10 July 2008; 18 years ago
- Headquarters: Gurugram, Haryana, India
- Area served: India
- Owner: Eternal Limited
- Founders: Deepinder Goyal; Pankaj Chaddah
- Key people: Deepinder Goyal (CEO & MD)
- Services: Food delivery; Table reservation; Local search
- Revenue: ▲₹94.18 billion (US$980 million) (FY25)
- Website: zomato.com

Zomato is an Indian online food ordering and delivery service owned by Eternal Limited. Created in 2008 by Deepinder Goyal and Pankaj Chaddah, it began as a restaurant aggregator, providing menu information, user reviews, and recommendations, and expanding to more than 20 countries by 2015. In 2015, Zomato entered the food delivery market in India, which soon after became its core business.

Deepinder Goyal was awarded EY Entrepreneur of the Year in 2025. In October 2025, the Ministry of Labour in India tied up with Zomato to boost employment opportunities and strengthen the gig economy.

As of 2023, Zomato provided food delivery and table reservation options in more than 800 Indian cities, with restaurant discovery services limited to the UAE following its exit from other international markets.

== History ==
=== Early years (2008–2010) ===
On 10 July 2008, Deepinder Goyal and Pankaj Chaddah launched a restaurant-listing website named FoodieBay, while working at Bain & Company. They quit their jobs in November 2009 to focus on the website full-time, and incorporated the company on 18 January 2010 as DC Foodiebay Online Services Private Limited. In November 2010, the website was renamed Zomato as they were unsure if they would "just stick to food" and to avoid a potential naming conflict with eBay. A mobile app for Zomato was released the following month.

=== Expansion (2011–2015) ===
Zomato logo in 2012

Availability of Zomato in 2015

With the introduction of .xxx domains in 2011, Zomato also launched zomato.xxx, a site dedicated to food porn. Later in 2011, Zomato introduced online ticketing for events on its website.

In 2011, Zomato expanded across India to Delhi, Mumbai, Bengaluru, Chennai, Pune, Ahmedabad and Hyderabad. In 2012, it expanded operations internationally in several countries, including the United Arab Emirates, Sri Lanka, Qatar, the United Kingdom, the Philippines, and South Africa. In 2013, it expanded to New Zealand, Turkey, Brazil, and Indonesia, with websites and apps available in Turkish, Portuguese, Indonesian, and English languages. In April 2014, it was launched in Chile and Portugal, which was followed by launches in Canada, Lebanon, and Ireland in 2015.

In January 2015, Zomato acquired Seattle-based restaurant discovery portal Urbanspoon, which led to the firm's entry into the United States and Australia. This U.S. expansion brought Zomato into direct competition with similar models such as Yelp and Foursquare. In June 2015, Zomato announced the closure of Urbanspoon, with its traffic being redirected to Zomato.

=== Entry into food delivery (2015–2019) ===
Zomato's logo from 2016 to 2018

In March 2015, Zomato started its food delivery service in India, initially partnering with hyperlocal logistics companies such as Delhivery, Grab and Runnr to fulfill deliveries from restaurants that did not have their own delivery service. After acquiring Runnr in 2017, it transitioned to delivering with its own fleet.

In January 2016, it launched table reservation feature on its application in India.

In February 2017, it introduced a paid membership program called Zomato Gold using which subscribers could get offers and discounts on dining and food delivery at Zomato's partner restaurants.

In March 2019, Zomato's UAE food delivery business was sold to Talabat.

=== 2020–present ===
In January 2020, Zomato acquired Uber Eats' India business in an all-stock deal, giving Uber a 9.99% stake in the company. Following the acquisition, Uber Eats discontinued its standalone operations in India, and its users and restaurant partners were migrated to Zomato's platform. According to industry estimates at the time, Uber Eats had a market share of less than 5%, while the acquisition was projected to increase Zomato's market share to 52%.

Between April and July 2020, owing to a rising demand for online grocery ordering amid the COVID-19 lockdown, Zomato delivered groceries and essentials under a service named Zomato Market in over 80 Indian cities. In April 2020, it introduced contactless dining at its partner restaurants. In May 2020, Zomato started delivering alcohol in West Bengal, Jharkhand, and Odisha, before pulling out in April 2021, citing poor unit economics and scalability.

In November 2021, Zomato announced that it would cease its services in all countries except India and the UAE. By early 2024, it had completed the liquidation of more than 10 overseas subsidiaries, which were primarily focused on restaurant discovery and reviews.

In August 2022, Zomato launched an inter-city food delivery service called Legends, which was discontinued two years later.

In October 2023, Zomato launched merchant focussed delivery service Xtreme to enable sending and receiving small parcels easy and affordable but shut it down citing insufficient demand.

== Security breaches ==
On 4 June 2015, an Indian security researcher hacked the Zomato website and gained access to information about 62.5 million users. Using the vulnerability, he was able to access the personal data of users such as telephone numbers, email addresses, and Instagram private photos using their Instagram access token. Zomato fixed the issue within 48 hours of it becoming apparent.

On 18 May 2017, a security blog called HackRead claimed that over 17 million Zomato user records including emails and password hashes had been stolen due to a security breach. The company stated that no payment information or credit card details were stolen. The hacker removed the stolen user data from the dark web after Zomato agreed to start a bug bounty program.

== Feeding India ==
Started in 2014 by Ankit Kawatra, Feeding India is a nonprofit organisation focused on hunger relief initiatives in India. It operates volunteer-led meal distribution programs. Feeding India was acquired by Zomato in July 2019. In May 2022, Zomato claimed that Feeding India was serving over 200,000 meals every day under its Daily Feeding Program.

Zomato Feeding India has organised benefit concerts in Mumbai to raise awareness about malnutrition in India; it was headlined by Post Malone (in 2022) and Dua Lipa (in 2024).

== See also ==
- Swiggy
- Blinkit
