= Delhivery =

Indian logistics company

- Type: Public
- Traded as: NSE: DELHIVERY; BSE: 543529
- ISIN: INE148O01028
- Industry: Logistics
- Founded: May 2011 (15 years ago) in Delhi
- Founders: Sahil Barua; Mohit Tandon; Bhavesh Manglani; Suraj Saharan; Kapil Bharati
- Headquarters: Gurgaon, Haryana, India
- Area served: India
- Key people: Sahil Barua (MD and CEO); Ajith Pai (COO); Kapil Bharati (CTO)
- Services: Delivery, express mail, third-party logistics, supply chain management, truckload shipping, partial truckload shipping, freight forwarding
- Revenue: ▲₹9,372 crore (US$980 million) (2025)
- Operating income: ▲₹376 crore (US$39 million) (2025)
- Net income: ▲₹162 crore (US$17 million) (2025)
- Number of employees: 63,713 (2024)
- Website: delhivery.com
- Footnotes; Financials as of 31 March 2025.

Delhivery is an Indian logistics and supply chain company, based in Gurgaon. It was founded in 2011 by Sahil Barua, Mohit Tandon, Bhavesh Manglani, Suraj Saharan, and Kapil Bharati.

== History ==
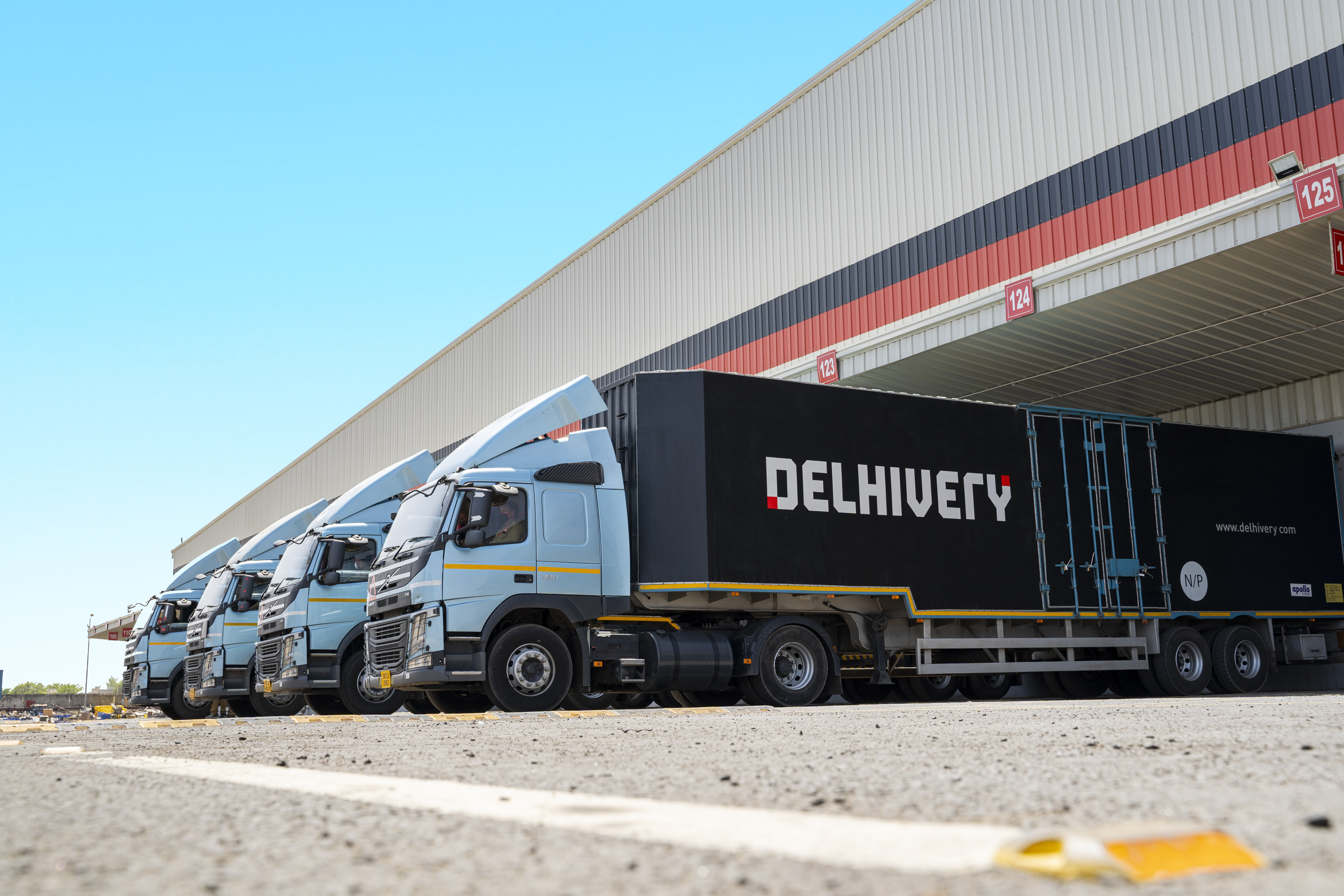
Delhivery trucks

Delhivery was established in May 2011 as SSN Logistics Ltd, initially conceptualised as a hyperlocal express delivery service provider for offline stores, delivering flowers and food in Gurgaon. During that time, the online retailing and e-commerce segment was expanding rapidly in India, with global investors showing significant interest in the industry.

Founders Barua and Tandon, who were at the time working as consultants with the management consulting firm, Bain & Company, were intrigued by the size and potential of the industry, and decided to focus on the segment. In June 2011, Delhivery signed its first e-commerce client, Urban Touch, an online fashion and beauty retailer. By August 2011, Delhivery had switched completely to offering logistics services to a number of e-commerce companies.

In March 2019, Delhivery raised its biggest round of funding with a $413 million investment from SoftBank. In May 2021, Delhivery revealed it has further raised $277 million in a funding round led by Fidelity, taking its market valuation to nearly $3 billion.

In August 2021, Delhivery acquired the B2B logistics company, Spoton Logistics, for ₹1,600 crore (US$170 million). In December 2021, it acquired California-based unmanned aircraft system company Transition Robotics Inc.

Delhivery raised ₹2,347 crore (US$250 million) of funding from 64 anchor investors ahead of its initial public offering in May 2022. In May 2022, Delhivery launched its initial public offering (IPO) of ₹5,235 crore (US$550 million) at a valuation of ₹35,283 crore (US$3.7 billion) and got listed on the BSE and the NSE.

In 2024, Delhivery became one of the sponsors of the Royal Challengers Bangalore team in the Indian Premier League.

== Organisation ==
Founder Sahil Barua is the CEO of Delhivery, and co-founder Kapil Bharati is the CTO. The two founders left the company on 30 March 2021.

== Investors ==
As of May 2024, the largest stakeholders in the company are SoftBank Group (11.74%), SBI Funds Management (9.10%) and Nexus Venture Partners (8.96%). Delhivery had raised about US$1.4 billion from its investors across 13 private fundraising rounds as of December 2021.

== Awards ==
- ET Startup of the Year Award 2019
- Mahindra Transport Excellence Award 2018
- Young Turk Start-up of the Year 2016
