= Non-store retailing =

Sale of goods and services outside of retail facilities

Non-store retailing is the selling of goods and services outside the confines of a retail facility. It is a generic term describing retailing taking place outside of shops and stores (that is, off the premises of fixed retail locations and of markets stands). The non-store distribution channel can be divided into direct selling (off-premises sales) and distance selling, the latter including all forms of electronic commerce. Distance selling includes mail order, catalogue sales, telephone solicitations and automated vending. Electronic commerce includes online shopping, internet trading platforms, travel portals, global distribution systems and teleshopping. Direct selling includes party sales and all forms of selling in consumers' homes and offices, including even garage sales.

Non-store retailing, sometimes also labelled home shopping, is consistently achieving double-digit growth, and slowly taking a bigger share of overall retailing. In the first quarter of 2014 online sales in the US represented over 6% of all sales. However, in product niches such as travel, books, and media, the share is significantly higher. As of March 2014, 19.5% of all book sales made by Amazon are for their Kindle e-book reader. Fashion and lifestyle brands have entered the non-store retailing space including Everlane, Dollar Shave Club, and Tieks. According to Eurostat, 38% of European consumers consider the internet as the most important source of information about travel and 42% of consumers purchased travel services over the internet in 2008.

The non-store distribution channel is marked by low entry thresholds. Compared to store retailing that requires a retail outlet, inventory, cash flow to hire staff and advertising, non-store retail start-ups usually have to invest little to reach out to potential buyers of the goods and services they offer. Non-store retailing is therefore not only used by established brick and mortar business retailers who develop an online bricks and clicks business model presence, but also by the individual pure play, often him- or herself a consumer, to create an online store or to run sales parties. The rise of social media helps to connect sellers to potential buyers.

Under European Union law, non-store retailing is heavily regulated. The Distance Selling Directive 97/7/EC (later amended, incorporated into UK law as Consumer Protection (Distance Selling) Regulations 2000), the Doorstep Selling Directive 85/577/EEC, the E-Commerce Directive 2000/31/EC and Electronic Commerce Regulations 2002 and the Audiovisual Services Directive 2010/13/EU are the principal regulatory tools to deal with the most technologically intensive but also innovative distribution methods.

== Consumer's right of withdrawal ==
A consumer's right to withdraw from a contract of sale concluded at a distance was provided for within the Distance Selling Directive. A consumer could make a decision within a period of seven working days of the contract of sale, without penalty and without giving a reason. The only charge that may be made to the consumer is the direct cost of returning the goods. The start of the withdrawal period varies depending on when the goods sold were received and when the seller provided information for the consumer on their withdrawal rights.

== See also ==
- Brick and mortar
- Home shopping
