= Online grocer =

Food store supporting online purchases

An online grocer is a supermarket or grocery store that allows ordering via websites or mobile apps. The order can either be collected by the customer or delivered to the customer by drivers engaged by the grocer, a food delivery service, or by delivery drones and robots.

== In-store pickup ==
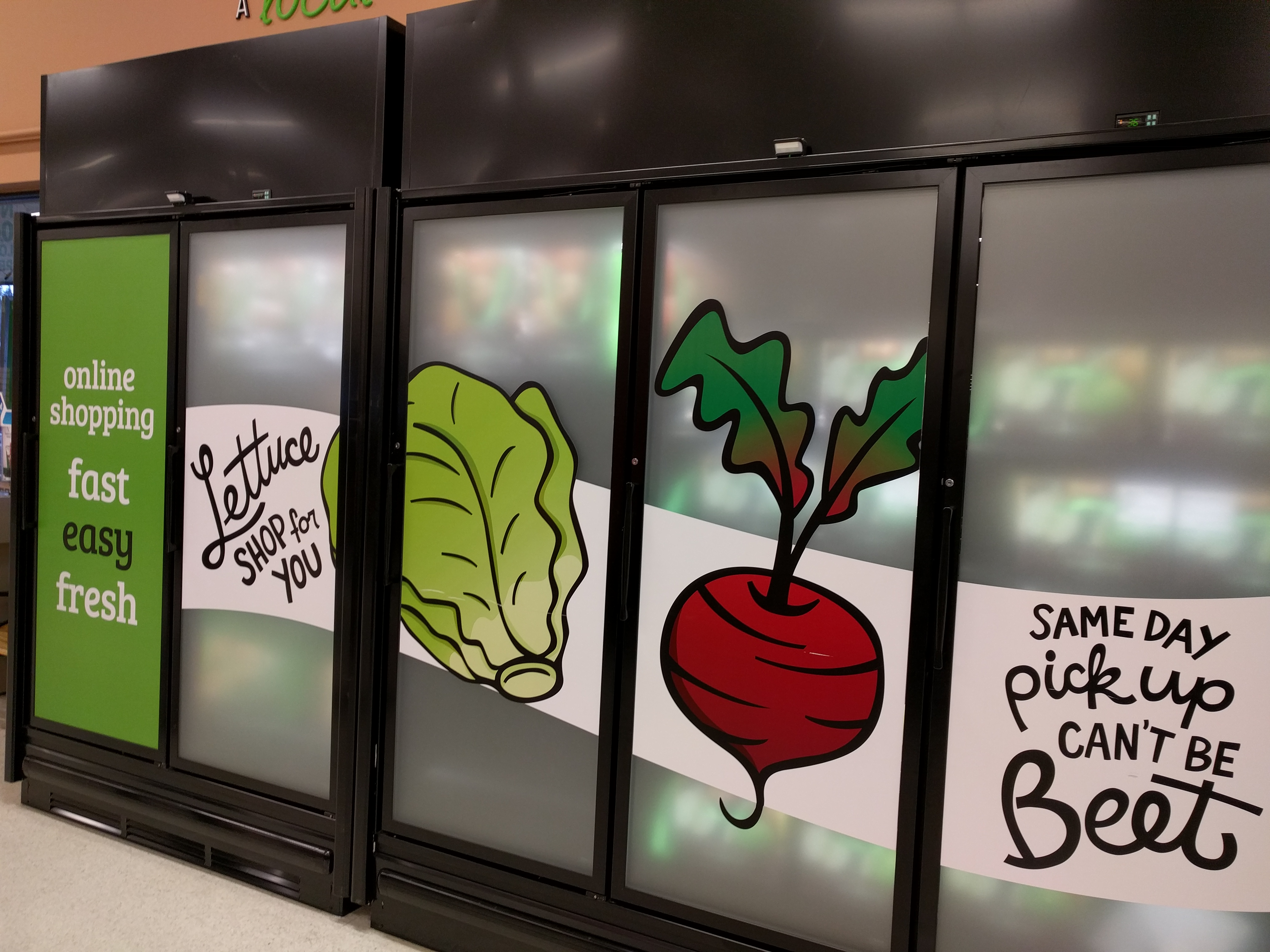
In-store order pickup fridges at a Save-On-Foods store in British Columbia, Canada

For brick-and-mortar stores that have online ordering, customers can place orders online and pick up their ready orders in the store on their way home. In-store pickup—sometimes termed "click & collect"—is typically offered for same-day shopping. It is usually less expensive than delivery, and can be done at a time of the customer's choosing. This option is popular in rural areas. It is also useful for customers living outside of the store's local delivery area.

== Local delivery ==
Most local online grocers have their own drivers. The most common type of personal delivery involves storing grocery inventory in a warehouse to deliver to customers once orders are placed. Another type of personal delivery which is less common is based on just-in-time business in which there is no warehouse or inventory. In this type of delivery, customers place orders for next-day delivery. The online grocer shops for the groceries on the morning of the delivery day.

Some grocery fulfilment centres are set up as dark stores. Online-only grocers typically have warehouses or distribution centers nearby, to allow local shipping of refrigerated items.

Online grocers with a large regional or national delivery area may ship groceries using courier services. If the order contains cold or frozen items, this involves "flash freezing" the goods and pack them into special shipping containers.

Companies have experimented with automated delivery modes including drone delivery and robots. For instance, in Fall 2016 Washington, D.C. approved a trial run of rolling delivery drones produced by Starship Technologies. The earthbound robots are similar to wheeled coolers and carry around 40 pounds of groceries.

== Platforms ==
The online grocer technology platform could be developed in-house, or a third party's platform could be re-used and customized to reflect the company brand and provide unique features. In some cases, all management and support tasks are being outsourced to the platform provider.

== Market size and share ==
In the United States, in 2017, Amazon.com sold $2 billion worth of groceries online. It had the largest market share, 18%, followed by Walmart. Amazon acquired Whole Foods Market to help accelerate growth efforts in the online grocery sector. Other companies with substantial market share in the US are Target and Instacart.

The value of the US online grocery market grew from $12 billion in 2016 to $26 billion in 2018 and it has plenty of room to grow, given that the size of the overall grocery market was $632 billion in 2018 according to IBISWorld.

Online grocery shopping grew substantially during the COVID-19 pandemic. The COVID-19 pandemic greatly accelerated the growth of online grocers, and in the first few months of the pandemic, online grocery shopping increased by 300%. In addition, first-time online grocery shoppers accounted for 41% of online grocery shoppers. COVID-19 hastened the uptake of online grocery shopping. Pre-COVID-19 food shopping activity accounted for 9% of the market, but 63 percent of consumers worldwide purchased more groceries online after the outbreak than they did before they were socially isolated.

In the United States in 2022, 47% of people used online grocers, including 2% of people who used online grocers as their exclusive grocery provider. The market size in the U.S. in 2022 was $42.8 billion. Walmart was the largest online grocer in the US that year with 27.6% of market share, followed by Amazon.com / Whole Foods Market at 21% and Kroger at 10%.

== Impact on the environment ==
Online grocery stores may allow facilitating local food which may reduce the environmental impact of food transport. Small-scale farmers have been embracing digital technologies as a way to directly sell produce, and community-supported agriculture and direct-sell delivery systems are on the rise during the coronavirus pandemic. Furthermore, weekly grocery deliveries can be a better choice than individual trips to a store.

Some online grocery stores have a goal of supporting the production and sale of fresh, organic, locally grown, sustainable foods.

== Data and online grocers ==
The biggest advantage that online grocers have vis-a-vis brick-and-mortar store is more accurate data. Online grocers can use AI and machine-learning models to provide a more personalized experience for their customers. There are four main ways to utilize data for online grocers: creating smart shopping lists, personalizing discounts, personalizing the way items are shown to users, and providing contextualized recommendations. All these are intended to increase up-selling and cross-selling options as well as increase the customer's lifetime value.

== See also ==
- Dark store
- Flash freezing
- Online food ordering
- Online supermarkets in China
- Starship Technologies
