= Dark store =

Retail outlet that only focuses on online shopping

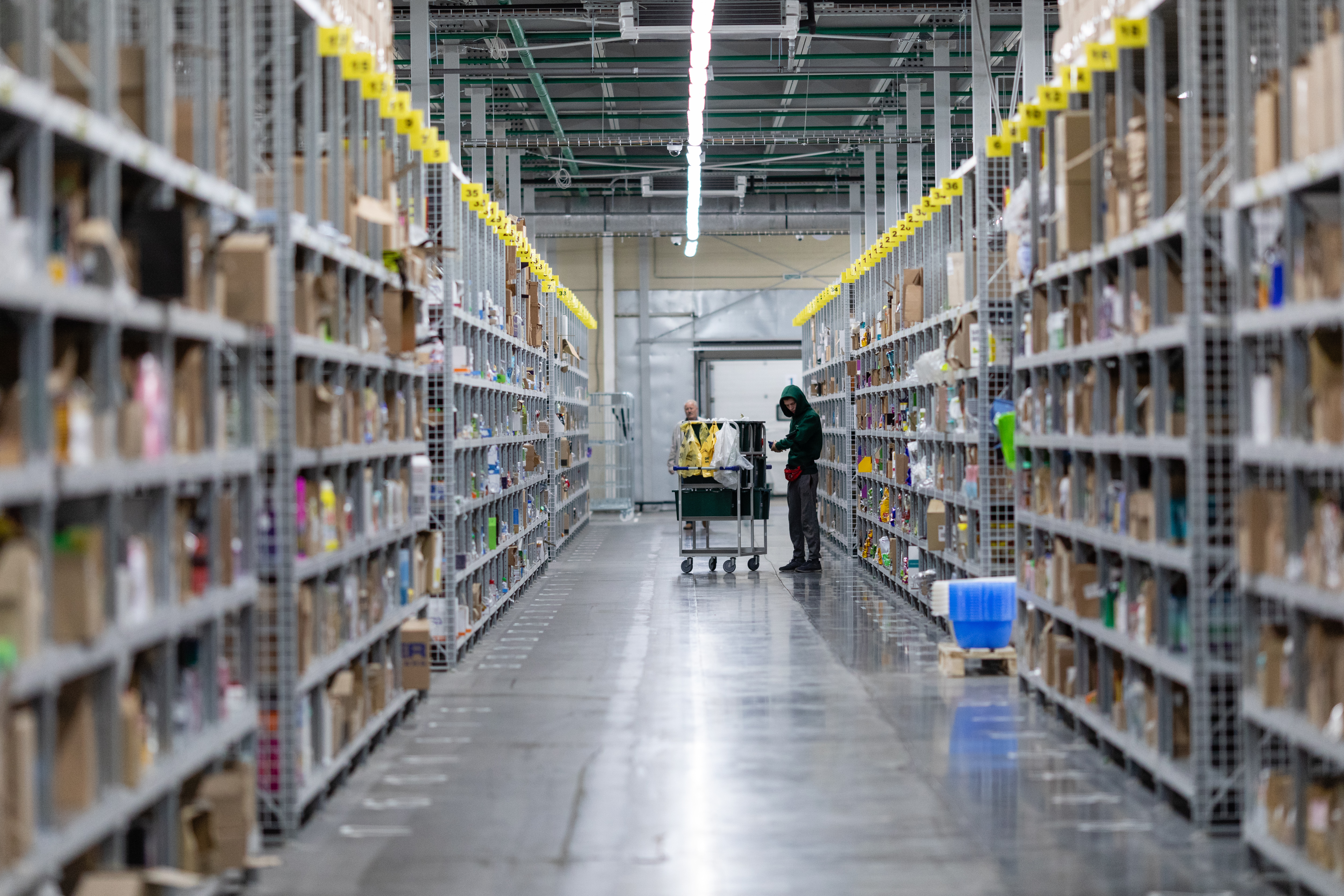
A dark store interior in Moscow, Russia

A dark store (also dark shop, dark supermarket or dotcom centre) is a retail outlet or distribution centre that exists exclusively for online shopping. A dark store is generally a large warehouse that can be used either to facilitate a "click-and-collect" service, where a customer collects an item they have ordered online, or as an order fulfillment platform for online sales. The format was initiated in the United Kingdom, and its popularity has also spread to France followed by the rest of the European Union and Russia, as well as to the United States.

As of 2021, many companies were competing to provide rapid delivery of groceries. Most were financed by venture capital, and were fighting for market share and prepared to take initial large losses in doing so. Professor Annabelle Gawer, director of the Centre of Digital Economy at the University of Surrey, pointed out that the industry being disrupted is not food supply, but local delivery. Gawer asserts "delivery has never been a profitable industry".

== Concept ==
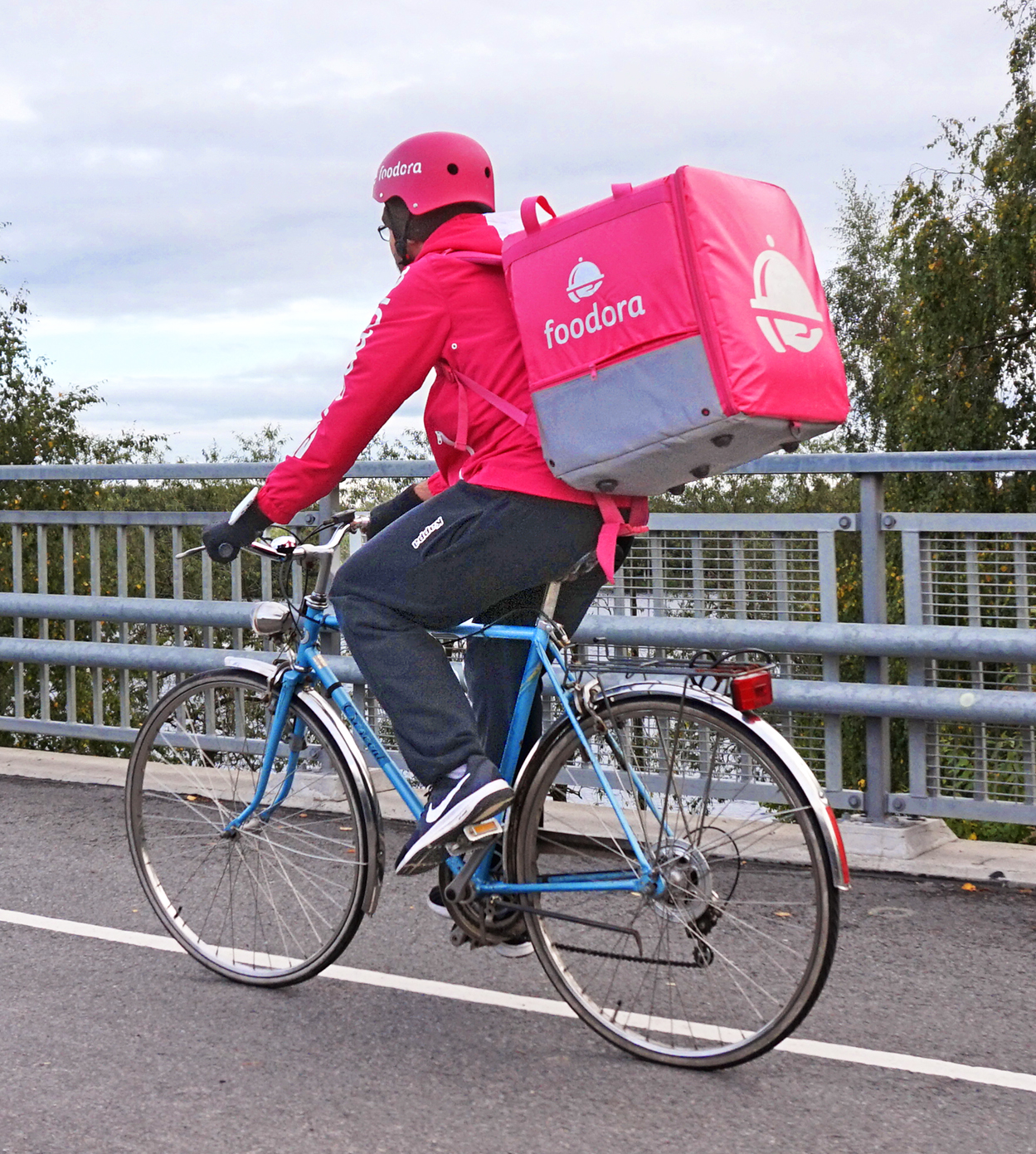
Foodora's home delivery by bicycle in Tampere, Finland

Not open to the public, the interior of a dark supermarket may appear like a conventional supermarket, set out with aisles of shelves containing groceries and other retail items. However, without having to deal with retail customers, the stores are not located in the high street or shopping centers, but mostly in areas that are preferred for good road connections. The buildings are often utilitarian and undistinguished from the outside. Inside, the stores dispense with assistants who provide product advice, check-out counters and point of sale displays.

After orders received via the Internet are processed, the orders are sent to the shop floor. These electronically generated orders, processed and routed according to the store layout for optimal picking, are picked by store employees, known as "personal shoppers" (colloquially "pickers"), who work around the clock fulfilling the orders displayed on a tablet computer attached to their shopping trolley. More than one order can often be collected simultaneously.

Tesco opened a "fourth generation dotcom store" in Erith in October 2013 with a much larger product range – 30,000 lines – and higher degree of mechanization that brings items to pickers rather than requiring them to collect individual products manually. Fulfilled orders are then delivered to the customer by a fleet of vans. A certain time of day, usually in the early hours of the morning, is set aside for stock replenishment. In the United States, Toys-R-Us adopted a version of the dark store model, but it uses existing stores as warehouses. Traditional and online operations converge as the company uses their parked inventory to deliver online orders.

While most popular dark stores serve groceries, some of them are clothing shops, helping brands to cut costs. Dark stores are less costly to operate not only because they are located in cheaper rental areas, but also because of the reduced picking cost. A dark store-picked grocery order costs a company around £12, which is significantly lower than the £18-£20 cost per grocery order picked at a traditional store.

The format is also popular in France, where, as of 2014, some 2,000 dark stores operated for the "click-and-collect" model.

== Growth in popularity ==
The first UK supermarket to trial the concept of a specific store for online goods was Sainsbury's, which operated a distribution center at Park Royal in London during the early 2000s, but the retailer closed the outlet because of a low order quantity. It was over a decade afterwards, in October 2013, that they announced plans for another, at Bromley-by-Bow, in East London.

The term 'dark store' originally appeared in the UK in 2009 when Tesco opened their first such supermarkets in Croydon, Surrey, and Aylesford, Kent. At the time, Tesco were receiving around 475,000 orders per week which were being fulfilled from its existing retail supermarkets. Supermarkets began opening dark stores to assist with distribution in geographical areas where there was a high demand for online delivery. Retail companies with dark stores usually operate fleets of light trucks to deliver orders made online, particularly to inner urban areas, avoiding disruptions to offline store operations.

The dark store format was seen by Tesco as a more efficient way of dealing with the expansion in online sales. The retailer planned to open one dark store per year "for the foreseeable future". By 2013, Tesco had opened six dotcom centers in and around London, and was responsible for 47.5% of online deliveries made in the UK. The latest of these was a store that opened in Erith in October 2013. The industry publication Retail Gazette described the store as a "fourth generation dotcom store" because of the greater emphasis on a mechanised system that brought items to pickers rather than requiring them to collect individual products manually, while chilled goods are conveyed directly from refrigerator to delivery van. The Erith store holds a range of 30,000 products, and has a capacity to process 4,000 online orders a day.

In November 2012, Zoe Wood of The Guardian reported that a number of dark stores had been opened by major supermarket chains in the UK, including Tesco and Waitrose, with more planned. Waitrose opened their first online distribution center at the site of a former John Lewis warehouse in London in April 2011, and in September 2013 announced plans for a second, purpose-built center at Coulsdon that would open in 2014. The company had previously used the Ocado distribution service to dispatch its goods to customers, but wished to commence its own delivery service.

In 2020, Amazon-owned US retailer Whole Foods opened its first purpose-built online only dark store, in Brooklyn.

In 2021, a report produced by OneStock indicated that more than 67% of consumers across Europe had used the dark store format during the COVID-19 pandemic, either to click and collect goods or through online delivery. In the UK, data produced by the Local Data Company in 2021 indicated that 8,700 High Street stores had closed during the first half of 2021 as a result of the pandemic. An increased demand for online retail had prompted many retailers to repurpose their traditional stores to fulfil online orders. In September 2021, Internet Retailing magazine reported that 84% of UK consumers had purchased from a dark store since the pandemic, with said figure rising to 91% in the 25–44 age group.

In January 2022, the city of Amsterdam froze the opening of new dark stores because of noise and increased scooter traffic near these stores. The appearance of the stores was also deemed undesirable. In May 2022, New York City began cracking down on dark stores that violated zoning laws by operating as warehouses in retail areas, requiring businesses to allow in-store shopping or relocate to areas of the city zoned for manufacturing.

== See also ==
- Bricks and clicks – Business model by which a company integrates both offline and online presences
- E-commerce – Type of business industry usually conducted over the internet
- Ghost kitchen – Delivery-only restaurant
- Non-store retailing – Sale of goods and services outside of retail facilities
- Online shopping – Form of electronic commerce
