= Shark Tank India season 5 =

Fifth season of business reality show Shark Tank India

Shark Tank India
- Season 5
- Starring: See below
- No. of episodes: 52

Release
- Original network: Sony LIV
- Original release: 5 January – 17 March 2026

Season chronology
- ← Previous; Season 4

The fifth season of Shark Tank India started from 5th January 2026 and ended on 17th March 2026.

== Format ==
Apart from the existing Sharks from previous season- Aman Gupta, Anupam Mittal, Namita Thapar, Vineeta Singh, Ritesh Agarwal, Kunal Bahl and Viraj Bahl.

The main judges of Season 5 are Amit Jain of Car Dekho, Mohit Yadav of Minimalist, Kanika Tekriwal of JetsetGO, Shaily Mehrotra, founder of FixDerma, and Hardik Kothiya and Varun Alagh were introduced.

Aditya Kulshrestha is the host for season 5.

== Sharks ==
Thirteen entrepreneurs were selected as the sharks for this season, with five of them (Mohit Yadav, Kanika Tekriwal, Shaily Mehrotra, Hardik Kothiya, Varun Alagh) introduced in this edition. Only five will be featured in each episode.

Shark	Company
Aman Gupta	Co-founder and Chief Marketing Officer of boAt Lifestyle
Anupam Mittal	Founder and CEO of Shaadi.com and People Group
Namita Thapar	Executive Director of Emcure Pharmaceuticals
Amit Jain	Co-founder and CEO of GirnarSoft
Ritesh Agarwal	Founder and CEO of OYO
Vineeta Singh	Co-founder and CEO of SUGAR Cosmetics
Kunal Bahl	Co-founder of SnapDeal
Viraj Bahl	Founder and CEO of Veeba
Mohit Yadav	Founder and CEO of Minimalist
Kanika Tekriwal	Founder and CEO of JetSetGo
Shaily Mehrotra	Founder and CEO of FixDerma
Hardik Kothiya	Founder and CEO of Rayzon Solar
Varun Alagh	Co-founder of Honasa Consumer Pvt Ltd

== Pitches and investments by sharks ==
Ep. no.	Pitch no.		Brand	Idea	Original ask	Deal	Investment by													
Ep. no.	Pitch no.		Brand	Idea	Original ask	Deal	Namita Thapar	Aman Gupta	Vineeta Singh	Anupam Mittal	Ritesh Agarwal	Kunal Bahl	Amit Jain	Mohit Yadav	Varun Alagh	Viraj Bahl	Kanika Tekriwal	Shaily Mehrotra	Hardik Kothiya	Pratham Mittal
1	1		Croffle	Crossiant + Waffle Brand	₹ 1 crore for 1% equity	₹ 2.5 crores for 5% equity			—N/a		—N/a	Green checkmark	—N/a	Green checkmark	—N/a	—N/a	—N/a	—N/a	—N/a	—N/a
1	2		Lewisia Wellness	Natural skincare and haircare wellness	₹ 1 crore for 1% equity	No deal			—N/a		—N/a		—N/a		—N/a	—N/a	—N/a	—N/a	—N/a	—N/a
1	3		Guugly Wuugly	Kidswear Clothings	₹ 50 lakhs for 5% equity	No deal			—N/a		—N/a		—N/a		—N/a	—N/a	—N/a	—N/a	—N/a	—N/a
2	4		EMoMee	Educational and emotional toys	₹ 1 crore for 2% equity	₹ 2 crores for 4% equity	Green checkmark	Green checkmark	—N/a		—N/a		—N/a		—N/a	—N/a	—N/a	—N/a	—N/a	—N/a
2	5		Capture a trip	Travel company	₹ 75 lakhs 1.5% equity	₹ 75 lakhs 5% equity			—N/a		—N/a	Green checkmark	—N/a	Green checkmark	—N/a	—N/a	—N/a	—N/a	—N/a	—N/a
2	6		Loopie	Baby gear brand	₹ 75 lakhs for 1% equity	No deal			—N/a		—N/a		—N/a		—N/a	—N/a	—N/a	—N/a	—N/a	—N/a
3	7		SaveSage	Rewards Optimization	₹ 1 crore for 1% equity	₹ 4 crores for 9% equity	Green checkmark		—N/a	Green checkmark	—N/a	Green checkmark	—N/a	Green checkmark	—N/a	—N/a	—N/a	—N/a	—N/a	—N/a
3	8		Kalam Labs	Research Labs for aerial vehicles	₹ 2 crores 0.67% equity	₹ 2 crores 1.25% equity		Green checkmark	—N/a		—N/a		—N/a		—N/a	—N/a	—N/a	—N/a	—N/a	—N/a
3	9		Panteazy	Intimate clothing brand for men	₹ 50 lakhs for 5% equity	No deal			—N/a		—N/a		—N/a		—N/a	—N/a	—N/a	—N/a	—N/a	—N/a
4	10		Oats by Goat	Overnight Oats brand	₹ 36 lakhs for 1% equity	₹ 2 crores for 8% equity		Green checkmark	—N/a	Green checkmark		—N/a		—N/a	—N/a	—N/a	—N/a	—N/a	—N/a	—N/a
4	11		Planyt	Smart plants	₹ 1.05 crores for 6.5% equity	No deal			—N/a			—N/a		—N/a	—N/a	—N/a	—N/a	—N/a	—N/a	—N/a
4	12		Avishkaar	AI based toys for kids	₹ 80 lakhs for 1% equity	No deal			—N/a			—N/a		—N/a	—N/a	—N/a	—N/a	—N/a	—N/a	—N/a
5	13	MATCH OFF	Emori	Lab-grown diamond jewellery brand	₹ 75 lakhs for 1% equity	₹ 1.5 crores for 3% for Anupam and 1.5 crores for 3% for others	Green checkmark		—N/a	Green checkmark	Green checkmark	—N/a	Green checkmark	—N/a	—N/a	—N/a	—N/a	—N/a	—N/a	—N/a
5	14	MATCH OFF	True Diamond	Lab-grown diamond jewellery	₹ 1.08 crores for 1% equity	No deal			—N/a			—N/a		—N/a	—N/a	—N/a	—N/a	—N/a	—N/a	—N/a
6	15	MATCH OFF	Smylo	Pet food brand	₹ 68 lakhs for 1% equity	₹ 75 lakhs for 1% equity + 2% advisory equity		—N/a		Green checkmark	—N/a	Green checkmark	—N/a	—N/a	Green checkmark	—N/a	—N/a	—N/a	—N/a	—N/a
6	16	MATCH OFF	Nootie by Pet Point	Pet food brand	₹ 1 crore for 1.2% equity	₹ 1 crore for 4% equity + 1% royalty till 1 crore is recouped	Green checkmark	—N/a		Green checkmark	—N/a		—N/a	—N/a		—N/a	—N/a	—N/a	—N/a	—N/a
7	17		Pista barfi	Traditional sweets brand	₹ 30 lakhs for 5% equity	No deal		—N/a			—N/a		—N/a	—N/a		—N/a	—N/a	—N/a	—N/a	—N/a
7	18		Corel lifecare	Nutrient food for fish farmers	₹ 1.2 crores for 2% equity	₹ 1.2 crores for 8% equity		—N/a		Green checkmark	—N/a	Green checkmark	—N/a	—N/a		—N/a	—N/a	—N/a	—N/a	—N/a
7	19		Vryse	AI optimization platform	₹ 40 lakhs for 2% equity	₹ 40 lakhs for 10% equity		—N/a		Green checkmark	—N/a		—N/a	—N/a		—N/a	—N/a	—N/a	—N/a	—N/a
8	20		MyPB	Peanut butter brand	₹ 70 lakhs for 10% equity	₹ 70 lakhs for 15% equity	Green checkmark	—N/a	Green checkmark	—N/a	—N/a		—N/a	—N/a	Green checkmark		—N/a	—N/a	—N/a	—N/a
8	21		xSTEP	Non evasive device for spine injuries	₹ 1 crore for 1% equity	₹ 1 crore for 10% equity	Green checkmark	—N/a	Green checkmark	—N/a	—N/a	Green checkmark	—N/a	—N/a			—N/a	—N/a	—N/a	—N/a
8	22		Truth & Hair	Curly hair care brand	₹ 1 crore for 2.5% equity	₹ 2.5 crores for 25% equity		—N/a		—N/a	—N/a		—N/a	—N/a	Green checkmark		—N/a	—N/a	—N/a	—N/a
9	23		Meta Fashion	Digital products company for Roblox	₹ 1 crore for 10% equity	No deal		—N/a		—N/a	—N/a		—N/a	—N/a			—N/a	—N/a	—N/a	—N/a
9	24		Japam	Spiritual wearables brand	₹ 1.5 crores for 1% equity	₹ 1.5 crores for 1% equity + 1% royalty till 1.5 crores is recouped	Green checkmark	—N/a		—N/a	—N/a		—N/a	—N/a	Green checkmark		—N/a	—N/a	—N/a	—N/a
9	25		Zen Barefoot	Barefoot shoes brand	₹ 1 crore for 5% equity	No deal		—N/a		—N/a	—N/a		—N/a	—N/a			—N/a	—N/a	—N/a	—N/a
10	26		RIDEV	E-scooter leasing company	₹ 6 crores for 3% equity	₹ 1 crore for 3% equity + 5 crores debt @ 14.5%		—N/a		—N/a	—N/a	Green checkmark	—N/a	—N/a			—N/a	—N/a	—N/a	—N/a
10	27		Stroom	Protein bar brand	₹ 1 crore for 2% equity	₹ 1 crore for 2.5% equity + 2% advisory equity		—N/a	Green checkmark	—N/a	—N/a	Green checkmark	—N/a	—N/a			—N/a	—N/a	—N/a	—N/a
10	28		TBFO	Women clothing brand	₹ 1 crore for 5% equity	No deal		—N/a		—N/a	—N/a		—N/a	—N/a			—N/a	—N/a	—N/a	—N/a
11	29		Neurapexai	AI assisted diagnostic platform	₹ 60 lakhs for 5% equity	₹ 60 lakhs for 5% equity		Green checkmark		—N/a			—N/a	—N/a	—N/a	—N/a	—N/a	—N/a	—N/a	—N/a
11	30		Wrestlefanent	Wrestling fan event platform	₹ 75 lakhs for 10% equity	No deal				—N/a			—N/a	—N/a	—N/a	—N/a	—N/a	—N/a	—N/a	—N/a
11	31		Ayuvya and imfresh	Ayurveda based supplements and beauty products	₹ 1 crore for 0.5% equity	No deal				—N/a			—N/a	—N/a	—N/a	—N/a	—N/a	—N/a	—N/a	—N/a
12	32		Every morning cartel	Dining cafe brand	₹ 5 crores for 2% equity	₹ 2 crores for 12% equity		Green checkmark		—N/a	Green checkmark		—N/a	—N/a	—N/a	—N/a	—N/a	—N/a	—N/a	—N/a
12	33		Cinefai studios	Gen-AI powered content studio	₹ 1 crore for 5% equity	₹ 50 lakhs for 5% equity + 50 lakhs debt @ 9% interest for 5 years				—N/a	Green checkmark		—N/a	—N/a	—N/a	—N/a	—N/a	—N/a	—N/a	—N/a
12	34		Sampark	QR based vehicle tag	₹ 1 crore for 2% equity	No deal				—N/a			—N/a	—N/a	—N/a	—N/a	—N/a	—N/a	—N/a	—N/a
13	35	MATCH OFF	Sovrenn	Stock discovery platform	₹ 1 crore for 1% equity	₹ 1.5 crores for 3%	—N/a		—N/a		—N/a		—N/a		—N/a	—N/a		—N/a	—N/a	—N/a
13	36	MATCH OFF	Multibagg.ai	AI Stock research platform	₹ 50 lakhs for 2% equity	₹ 50 lakhs for 1% equity	—N/a	Green checkmark	—N/a		—N/a		—N/a		—N/a	—N/a		—N/a	—N/a	—N/a
14	37		Uprear Build	Pre- fabricated construction company	₹ 2 crores for 2.5% equity	₹ 1 crore for 2% equity + 1 crore debt @ 10% interest for 3 years	—N/a		—N/a		—N/a	Green checkmark	—N/a		—N/a	—N/a		—N/a	—N/a	—N/a
14	38		PaperPro	Milk Adulting Kit	₹ 1 crore for 5% equity	No deal	—N/a		—N/a		—N/a		—N/a		—N/a	—N/a		—N/a	—N/a	—N/a
14	39		Cosmo health	Emergency health services	₹ 1 crore for 4% equity	₹ 1 crore for 9% equity	—N/a		—N/a	Green checkmark	—N/a	Green checkmark	—N/a		—N/a	—N/a	Green checkmark	—N/a	—N/a	—N/a
15	40		Galli labs	Hand crafted shoewear brand	₹ 1 crore for 0.5% equity	₹ 1 crore for 0.57% equity	—N/a	Green checkmark	—N/a		—N/a		—N/a		—N/a	—N/a		—N/a	—N/a	—N/a
15	41		Twin	AI powered clothes try-on platform	₹ 60 lakhs for 1% equity	₹ 80 lakhs for 2% equity	—N/a	Green checkmark	—N/a		—N/a		—N/a		—N/a	—N/a		—N/a	—N/a	—N/a
15	42		RCX light	Digital fasade company	₹ 50 lakhs for 5% equity	₹ 10 lakhs for 5% equity + 40 lakhs debt @ 12% interest for 3 years	—N/a	Green checkmark	—N/a		—N/a		—N/a		—N/a	—N/a		—N/a	—N/a	—N/a
16	43		Awsum	Packaged cakes brand	₹ 1 crore for 1% equity	₹ 1 crore for 1.33% equity		Green checkmark	—N/a		Green checkmark	—N/a		—N/a	—N/a	—N/a	—N/a	—N/a	—N/a	—N/a
16	44		Phitku	Alum based natural deodorants	₹ 1.8 crores for 1% equity	₹ 1.8 crores for 1% equity + 5% royalty until 5.4 crores is recouped		Green checkmark	—N/a	Green checkmark		—N/a		—N/a	—N/a	—N/a	—N/a	—N/a	—N/a	—N/a
16	45		9DXR labs	VR based platform for schools	₹ 1 crore for 4% equity	No deal			—N/a			—N/a		—N/a	—N/a	—N/a	—N/a	—N/a	—N/a	—N/a
17	46		Pureflow	Nasal strip brand	₹ 1 crore for 3.33% equity	No deal			—N/a		—N/a		—N/a		—N/a	—N/a	—N/a	—N/a	—N/a	—N/a
17	47		Get snappy	Body adhesive brand	₹ 60 lakhs for 5% equity	₹ 2 crore for 20% equity		Green checkmark	—N/a		—N/a		—N/a		—N/a	—N/a	—N/a	—N/a	—N/a	—N/a
17	48		Awayddings	Destination wedding planners	₹ 2 crores for 5% equity	₹ 1 crore for 10% equity + 1 crore debt @ 10% interest for 2 years		Green checkmark	—N/a		—N/a		—N/a		—N/a	—N/a	—N/a	—N/a	—N/a	—N/a
18	49		Urbanwipe	Acid free home cleaning solutions	₹ 90 lakhs for 2% equity	₹ 2 crores for 10% equity		Green checkmark	—N/a	Green checkmark	—N/a		—N/a		—N/a	—N/a	—N/a	—N/a	—N/a	—N/a
18	50		Antinorm	All in one beauty brand	₹ 1.03 crores for 1% equity	₹ 1.03 crores for 1% equity			—N/a	Green checkmark	—N/a		—N/a		—N/a	—N/a	—N/a	—N/a	—N/a	—N/a
18	51		Sepoy & co	Premium mixer brand	₹ 3 crores for 2% equity	No deal			—N/a		—N/a		—N/a		—N/a	—N/a	—N/a	—N/a	—N/a	—N/a
19	52		Bonkers corner	Unisex streetwear brand	₹ 1.5 crores for 0.5% equity	₹ 2 crores for 10% equity	Green checkmark		—N/a		—N/a		—N/a		—N/a	—N/a	—N/a	—N/a	—N/a	—N/a
19	53		Bubble me	Magnesium driven wellness brand	₹ 50 lakhs for 1.67% equity	No deal			—N/a		—N/a		—N/a		—N/a	—N/a	—N/a	—N/a	—N/a	—N/a
19	54		Out live	fasting guidance program	₹ 1 crore for 4% equity	No deal			—N/a		—N/a		—N/a		—N/a	—N/a	—N/a	—N/a	—N/a	—N/a
20	55		Metadrive	Motion based driving platform	₹ 90 lakhs for 1% equity	No deal			—N/a		—N/a		—N/a		—N/a	—N/a	—N/a	—N/a	—N/a	—N/a
20	56		Sparsh brush	Automatic grooming brushes for cattle	₹ 20 lakhs for 1% equity	₹ 20 lakhs for 1% equity + 2% royalty until 1 crore is recouped	Green checkmark		—N/a	Green checkmark	—N/a		—N/a		—N/a	—N/a	—N/a	—N/a	—N/a	—N/a
20	57		Shesha Ayurveda	Ayurvedic beauty and hair care brand	₹ 1 crore for 1.5% equity	₹ 2 crores for 8% equity + 1% royalty until 2 crores is recouped	Green checkmark	Green checkmark	—N/a		—N/a		—N/a		—N/a	—N/a	—N/a	—N/a	—N/a	—N/a
21	58		Cookie cartel	Baked homemade cookies brand	₹ 75 lakhs for 5% equity	₹ 80 lakhs for 12% equity			Green checkmark	Green checkmark	—N/a	—N/a	—N/a	—N/a	—N/a	—N/a	Green checkmark	—N/a	—N/a	—N/a
21	59		Avia litewings	Gyrocopter and aircraft company	₹ 1 crores for 1% equity	No deal					—N/a	—N/a	—N/a	—N/a	—N/a	—N/a		—N/a	—N/a	—N/a
21	60		Aabo ring	Smart wellness tracking ring	₹ 1.5 crores for 1% equity	No deal					—N/a	—N/a	—N/a	—N/a	—N/a	—N/a		—N/a	—N/a	—N/a
22	61	MATCH OFF	Krvvy	Women's innerwear and shapewear brand	₹ 1.2 crores for 2% equity	₹ 1.2 crores for 3% equity	Green checkmark				—N/a	—N/a	—N/a	—N/a	—N/a	—N/a		—N/a	—N/a	—N/a
22	62	MATCH OFF	Invogue	Women's shapewear brand	₹ 50 lakhs for 1.25% equity	₹ 2 crores for 15% equity		Green checkmark			—N/a	—N/a	—N/a	—N/a	—N/a	—N/a		—N/a	—N/a	—N/a
23	63		Taasha craft	Handcrafted jewelry and bangles	₹ 75 lakhs for 5% equity	₹ 75 lakhs for 5% equity + 1% royalty till 75 lakhs is recouped	Green checkmark	Green checkmark			—N/a	—N/a	—N/a	—N/a	—N/a	—N/a		—N/a	—N/a	—N/a
23	64		Mishmash naturals	Ayurvedic Kids makeup brand	₹ 50 lakhs for 2% equity	No deal					—N/a	—N/a	—N/a	—N/a	—N/a	—N/a		—N/a	—N/a	—N/a
23	65		Indian school of calisthenics	Calisthenics training institute	₹ 75 lakhs for 5% equity	No deal					—N/a	—N/a	—N/a	—N/a	—N/a	—N/a		—N/a	—N/a	—N/a
24	66		Wholeleaf	Cannibis wellness brand	₹ 50 lakhs for 2.1% equity	₹ 1.5 crores for 7.5% equity	Green checkmark	Green checkmark			—N/a	—N/a	—N/a	—N/a	—N/a	—N/a	Green checkmark	—N/a	—N/a	—N/a
24	67		Chewie by Mankomb	Wet waste to soil converter	₹ 2 crores for 1.5% equity	No deal					—N/a	—N/a	—N/a	—N/a	—N/a	—N/a		—N/a	—N/a	—N/a
24	68		Madrasi kaapi house	Coffee brand	₹ 75 lakhs for 5% equity	No deal					—N/a	—N/a	—N/a	—N/a	—N/a	—N/a		—N/a	—N/a	—N/a
25	69		Soundverse	AI based music generator	₹ 1.35 crores for 1.5% equity	₹ 1.35 crores for 5% equity	Green checkmark		—N/a		—N/a		—N/a	—N/a	—N/a	—N/a	—N/a		—N/a	—N/a
25	70		Kilrr	Marinades and spices brand	₹ 1 crore for 1% equity	₹ 1 crore for 1.06% equity			—N/a	Green checkmark	—N/a		—N/a	—N/a	—N/a	—N/a	—N/a		—N/a	—N/a
25	71		Offline by Happy Hour	Offline social meetup platform	₹ 50 lakhs for 5% equity	No deal			—N/a		—N/a		—N/a	—N/a	—N/a	—N/a	—N/a		—N/a	—N/a
26	72		Panda's box	Devotional toys brand	₹ 80 lakhs for 2% equity	₹ 1.2 crores for 12% equity + 2% royalty until 1.2 crores is recouped	Green checkmark	Green checkmark	—N/a		—N/a		—N/a	—N/a	—N/a	—N/a	—N/a		—N/a	—N/a
26	73		Bindi project	Hand-crafted bindi brand	₹ 50 lakhs for 10% equity	No deal			—N/a		—N/a		—N/a	—N/a	—N/a	—N/a	—N/a		—N/a	—N/a
26	74		Voxturn AI	AI powered sales agent	₹ 1 crore for 10% equity	No deal			—N/a		—N/a		—N/a	—N/a	—N/a	—N/a	—N/a		—N/a	—N/a
27	75		My wonder	AI powered learning companion	₹ 80 lakhs for 1% equity	No deal	—N/a		—N/a		—N/a		—N/a		—N/a	—N/a		—N/a	—N/a	—N/a
27	76		Cotopay	UPI based expense management	₹ 50 lakhs for 1% equity	₹ 75 lakhs for 2% equity + 1% advisory equity	—N/a		—N/a	Green checkmark	—N/a	Green checkmark	—N/a		—N/a	—N/a		—N/a	—N/a	—N/a
27	77		Local all natural soda	Farm to bottle beverage brand	₹ 50 lakhs for 2% equity	No deal	—N/a		—N/a		—N/a		—N/a		—N/a	—N/a		—N/a	—N/a	—N/a
28	78		The binge town	Private theatre for celebrations	₹ 2 crores for 2% equity	₹ 1 crore for 2.5% equity + 1 crore debt @15% for 4 years		—N/a			—N/a		—N/a	—N/a	Green checkmark	—N/a	—N/a	—N/a	—N/a	—N/a
28	79		PropFTX	Fractional real estate investments	₹ 1 crore for 1.5% equity	No deal		—N/a			—N/a		—N/a	—N/a		—N/a	—N/a	—N/a	—N/a	—N/a
28	80		Eight times eight	Chess classes	₹ 50 lakhs for 5% equity	No deal		—N/a			—N/a		—N/a	—N/a		—N/a	—N/a	—N/a	—N/a	—N/a
29	81		Warrior world	Indian army inspired apparel brand	₹ 75 lakhs for 1% equity	₹ 75 lakhs for 1% equity + 1.5% royalty till 1.25 crores is recouped		—N/a	Green checkmark		—N/a		—N/a	—N/a		—N/a	—N/a	—N/a	—N/a	—N/a
29	82		Currently	Real time activity sharing app	₹ 1.2 crores for 1% equity	No deal		—N/a			—N/a		—N/a	—N/a		—N/a	—N/a	—N/a	—N/a	—N/a
29	83		Anjani books	Online bookstore	₹ 10 lakhs for 10% equity	No deal		—N/a			—N/a		—N/a	—N/a		—N/a	—N/a	—N/a	—N/a	—N/a
30	84		Booon	Curated fashion quick commerce platform	₹ 1 crore for 2% equity	No deal		—N/a		—N/a	—N/a		—N/a	—N/a			—N/a	—N/a	—N/a	—N/a
30	85		MeMeraki	Culture tech platform for indian arts	₹ 50 lakhs for 1.67% equity	₹ 1 crore for 4% equity	Green checkmark	—N/a		—N/a	—N/a	Green checkmark	—N/a	—N/a	Green checkmark	Green checkmark	—N/a	—N/a	—N/a	—N/a
30	86		3 Sisters	Non alcoholic beverages brand	₹ 3 crores for 2.5% equity	No deal		—N/a		—N/a	—N/a		—N/a	—N/a			—N/a	—N/a	—N/a	—N/a
31	87		Artociti	Relief mural home decor brand	₹ 1 crore for 3% equity	₹ 1 crore for 7.5% equity + 2% royalty till 1.5 crores is recouped	Green checkmark		Green checkmark	—N/a			—N/a	—N/a	—N/a	—N/a	—N/a	—N/a	—N/a	—N/a
31	88		Kreo	Gaming peripherals brand	₹ 2 crores for 1% equity	₹ 1 crore for 1% equity + 1crore debt @9% interest for 3 years				—N/a	Green checkmark		—N/a	—N/a	—N/a	—N/a	—N/a	—N/a	—N/a	—N/a
31	89		Rosada	Customised kids bags	₹ 1.25 crores for 4% equity	₹ 1.25 crores for 5% equity + 2% royalty till 1.25 crores is recouped	Green checkmark	Green checkmark		—N/a	Green checkmark		—N/a	—N/a	—N/a	—N/a	—N/a	—N/a	—N/a	—N/a
32	90		Baby works by Swapnil	Baby jewellery brand	₹ 60 lakhs for 4% equity	₹ 60 lakhs for 6% equity		Green checkmark		—N/a			—N/a	—N/a	—N/a	—N/a	—N/a	—N/a	—N/a	—N/a
32	91		Gramiyaa	Wood cold pressed oils	₹ 1.4 crores for 1% equity	No deal				—N/a			—N/a	—N/a	—N/a	—N/a	—N/a	—N/a	—N/a	—N/a
32	92		Mama nourish	Nutrious energy bars	₹ 60 lakhs for 1.5% equity	₹ 2 crores for 20% equity		Green checkmark		—N/a			—N/a	—N/a	—N/a	—N/a	—N/a	—N/a	—N/a	—N/a
33	93		Kelvin6k	Robotic construction company	₹ 1 crore for 1.33% equity	₹ 1 crore for 2.86% equity + 2.14 advisory equity				—N/a	Green checkmark		—N/a	—N/a	—N/a	—N/a	—N/a	—N/a	—N/a	—N/a
33	94		ANA apparels	Abayas, naquabs and dupatta brand	₹ 80 lakhs for 4% equity	No deal				—N/a			—N/a	—N/a	—N/a	—N/a	—N/a	—N/a	—N/a	—N/a
33	95		EzPac	Smart packaging solutions	₹ 2.5 crores for 5% equity	No deal				—N/a			—N/a	—N/a	—N/a	—N/a	—N/a	—N/a	—N/a	—N/a
34	96		Gappu	Percussion music instruments	₹ 30 lakhs for 1% equity	₹ 10 lakhs for 3% equity + 20 lakhs debt @12% interest for 3 years			—N/a			—N/a	Green checkmark	—N/a	—N/a	—N/a	—N/a	—N/a	—N/a	—N/a
34	97		Mister Veg	Plant based meat brand	₹ 2 crores for 2.5% equity	No deal			—N/a			—N/a		—N/a	—N/a	—N/a	—N/a	—N/a	—N/a	—N/a
34	98		Saras	Stock trading recommendations app	₹ 70 lakhs for 2% equity	No deal			—N/a			—N/a		—N/a	—N/a	—N/a	—N/a	—N/a	—N/a	—N/a
35	99		Speechgears	Therapeutic solutions for children with special needs	₹ 2 crores for 3% equity	No deal			—N/a			—N/a		—N/a	—N/a	—N/a	—N/a	—N/a	—N/a	—N/a
35	100		Heizen	AI powered software development firm	₹ 90 lakhs for 1% equity	₹ 90 lakhs for 2% equity			—N/a			—N/a	Green checkmark	—N/a	—N/a	—N/a	—N/a	—N/a	—N/a	—N/a
35	101		Pukaar.ai	AI powered parenting app	₹ 49 lakhs for 1.5% equity	No deal			—N/a			—N/a		—N/a	—N/a	—N/a	—N/a	—N/a	—N/a	—N/a
36	102		Upsnac	Wellness coffee brand	₹ 1 crore for 2% equity	No deal	—N/a		—N/a		—N/a		—N/a		—N/a	—N/a		—N/a	—N/a	—N/a
36	103		Kotson mattresses	Organic latex mattress brand	₹ 1.5 crores for 10% equity	No deal	—N/a		—N/a		—N/a		—N/a		—N/a	—N/a		—N/a	—N/a	—N/a
36	104		Kalakrit	AI based content localisation platform	₹ 1 crores for 10% equity	No deal	—N/a		—N/a		—N/a		—N/a		—N/a	—N/a		—N/a	—N/a	—N/a
36	105		SVS food	Vegetarian qsr food chain	₹ 3 crores for 5% equity	No deal	—N/a		—N/a		—N/a		—N/a		—N/a	—N/a		—N/a	—N/a	—N/a
37	106		Be Clinical	Skincare brand	₹ 75 lakhs for 1% equity	No deal	—N/a		—N/a		—N/a		—N/a		—N/a	—N/a		—N/a	—N/a	—N/a
37	107		Misfits	Hobby and meetup club	₹ 1 crore for 1.25% equity	₹ 1 crore for 3% equity	—N/a		—N/a		—N/a		—N/a		—N/a	—N/a	Green checkmark	—N/a	—N/a	—N/a
37	108		Krimmy thickshakes	Guilt-free shakes	₹ 1.25 crores for 5% equity	No deal	—N/a		—N/a		—N/a		—N/a		—N/a	—N/a		—N/a	—N/a	—N/a
38	109		Curry it	Instant curries and paste brand	₹ 60 lakhs for 1% equity	₹ 1.5 crores for 3.3% equity + 1.2% advisory equity			—N/a		—N/a		—N/a	Green checkmark	—N/a	—N/a	—N/a	—N/a	—N/a	—N/a
38	110		Dubpro.ai	AI-powered dubbing platform	₹ 1.25 crores for 5% equity	No deal			—N/a		—N/a		—N/a		—N/a	—N/a	—N/a	—N/a	—N/a	—N/a
38	111		Boingg	Custom kids furniture brand	₹ 2 crores for 5% equity	No deal			—N/a		—N/a		—N/a		—N/a	—N/a	—N/a	—N/a	—N/a	—N/a
39	112		Pragyan child development centers	Pediatric therapy services for children	₹ 1 crore for 5% equity	₹ 1 crore for 5% equity	Green checkmark		—N/a		—N/a		—N/a	Green checkmark	—N/a	—N/a	—N/a	—N/a	—N/a	—N/a
39	113		Sanchvi	Exclusive rental wear	₹ 1.5 crores for 5% equity	No deal			—N/a		—N/a		—N/a		—N/a	—N/a	—N/a	—N/a	—N/a	—N/a
39	114		Trring	Bluetooth call mirroring devices	₹ 50 lakhs for 7.5% equity	No deal			—N/a		—N/a		—N/a		—N/a	—N/a	—N/a	—N/a	—N/a	—N/a
40	115		Edinora	Edible grade toothpaste brand	₹ 2 crore for 5% equity	₹ 2 crore for 10% equity		Green checkmark	—N/a		—N/a		—N/a		—N/a	—N/a	—N/a	—N/a	—N/a	—N/a
40	116		Rehabveda	Home Neuro rehabilitation solution	₹ 1 crore for 2.5% equity	₹ 1 crore for 3% equity	Green checkmark		—N/a		—N/a		—N/a	Green checkmark	—N/a	—N/a	—N/a	—N/a	—N/a	—N/a
40	117		Freshpod	Helmet disinfectant device	₹ 2 crores for 6% equity	No deal			—N/a		—N/a		—N/a		—N/a	—N/a	—N/a	—N/a	—N/a	—N/a
41	118		Modge	Vegetarian cakes and desserts brand	₹ 1 crore for 4% equity	₹ 1 crore for 9% equity			—N/a	Green checkmark	—N/a		—N/a	—N/a	—N/a	—N/a	—N/a		—N/a	—N/a
41	119		Orbit card	One tap smart card	₹ 50 lakhs for 1% equity	₹ 60 lakhs for 4% equity		Green checkmark	—N/a		—N/a		—N/a	—N/a	—N/a	—N/a	—N/a		—N/a	—N/a
41	120		Hobfit	Women focused fitness tracking app	₹ 75 lakhs for 1.5% equity	No deal			—N/a		—N/a		—N/a	—N/a	—N/a	—N/a	—N/a		—N/a	—N/a
42	121		Shichisoru	Collectible characters	₹ 75 lakhs for 5% equity	₹ 35 lakhs for 10% equity + 40 lakhs debt @10% interest for 3 years			—N/a		—N/a		—N/a	—N/a	—N/a	—N/a	—N/a	Green checkmark	—N/a	—N/a
42	122		Rimigo	AI generated iteneries platform	₹ 1 crore for 1% equity	₹ 1 crore for 1.5% equity			—N/a		—N/a		—N/a	—N/a	—N/a	—N/a	—N/a	Green checkmark	—N/a	—N/a
42	123		Everaw nutrition	Fruit spread and snacks	₹ 1 crore for 8% equity	No deal			—N/a		—N/a		—N/a	—N/a	—N/a	—N/a	—N/a		—N/a	—N/a
43	124		Coro	Family first co-working hub	₹ 2 crores for 4% equity	No deal		—N/a		—N/a	—N/a		—N/a	—N/a			—N/a	—N/a	—N/a	—N/a
43	125		Luzo	Salon and Spa discovery app	₹ 1 crore for 1% equity	₹ 1 crore for 3% equity		—N/a		—N/a	—N/a	Green checkmark	—N/a	—N/a		Green checkmark	—N/a	—N/a	—N/a	—N/a
43	126		F2 Fintech	AI powered digital lending platform	₹ 1 crore for 3% equity	No deal		—N/a		—N/a	—N/a		—N/a	—N/a			—N/a	—N/a	—N/a	—N/a
44	127		Wellwith	Sea-buckthorn based wellness brand	₹ 1.5 crores for 1.25% equity	No deal		—N/a		—N/a	—N/a		—N/a	—N/a			—N/a	—N/a	—N/a	—N/a
44	128		Indian Hair World	Hair patches and extension brand	₹ 1 crore for 5% equity	No deal		—N/a		—N/a	—N/a		—N/a	—N/a			—N/a	—N/a	—N/a	—N/a
44	129		Awenest	Clean home and personal care products	₹ 70 lakhs for 2% equity	₹ 70 lakhs for 5% equity		—N/a		—N/a	—N/a		—N/a	—N/a		Green checkmark	—N/a	—N/a	—N/a	—N/a
45	130		HOOKd	Chicken chips brand	₹ 50 lakhs for 7% equity	₹ 50 lakhs for 20% equity		—N/a			—N/a		—N/a	—N/a	Green checkmark	—N/a	—N/a	—N/a	—N/a	—N/a
45	131		Littlecherrymom	Nutritious snacks for kids	₹ 75 lakhs for 3% equity	No deal		—N/a			—N/a		—N/a	—N/a		—N/a	—N/a	—N/a	—N/a	—N/a
45	132		Stubb	Portable ashtray brand	₹ 25 lakhs for 5% equity	No deal		—N/a			—N/a		—N/a	—N/a		—N/a	—N/a	—N/a	—N/a	—N/a
45	133		SoilSens	Soil intelligence tools	₹ 50 lakhs for 1% equity	₹ 50 lakhs for 6.67% equity	Green checkmark	—N/a	Green checkmark		—N/a		—N/a	—N/a		—N/a	—N/a	—N/a	—N/a	—N/a
47	134		Flashoot	Real time content creation platform	₹ 1.5 crores for 2% equity	No deal			—N/a		—N/a		—N/a		—N/a	—N/a	—N/a	—N/a	—N/a	—N/a
47	135	MATCH OFF	Nap Tap Go	Japanese style capsule pod hotels	₹ 2 crores lakhs for 2.5% equity	No deal			—N/a		—N/a		—N/a		—N/a	—N/a	—N/a	—N/a	—N/a	—N/a
47	136	MATCH OFF	BlrPods.com	Japanese style capsule pod hotels	₹ 90 lakhs for 1.5% equity	No deal			—N/a		—N/a		—N/a		—N/a	—N/a	—N/a	—N/a	—N/a	—N/a
46	137		Nytarra	Home freshner brand	₹ 75 lakhs for 2% equity	No deal			—N/a		—N/a		—N/a		—N/a	—N/a	—N/a	—N/a	—N/a	—N/a
46	138		BYLX	Archery equipment brand	₹ 50 lakhs for 2% equity	No deal			—N/a		—N/a		—N/a		—N/a	—N/a	—N/a	—N/a	—N/a	—N/a
46	139		Green pista	Marketplace for currency notes	₹ 1 crore for 2% equity	No deal			—N/a		—N/a		—N/a		—N/a	—N/a	—N/a	—N/a	—N/a	—N/a
48	140		CTRUH	AI-powered XR commerce studio	₹ 1 crores for 1.2% equity	₹ 1 crores for 2.4% equity			Green checkmark	Green checkmark	—N/a	—N/a	—N/a	—N/a	—N/a	—N/a		—N/a	—N/a	—N/a
48	141		SteamPRO	Home steam and Sauna solution	₹ 1 crore for 2% equity	No deal					—N/a	—N/a	—N/a	—N/a	—N/a	—N/a		—N/a	—N/a	—N/a
48	142		Uptown	Coliving and accommodation	₹ 75 lakhs for 3% equity	No deal					—N/a	—N/a	—N/a	—N/a	—N/a	—N/a		—N/a	—N/a	—N/a
49	143		KorinMi	Korean hair and skincare brand	₹ 1 crore for 2% equity	No deal					—N/a	—N/a	—N/a	—N/a	—N/a	—N/a		—N/a	—N/a	—N/a
49	144		Dent @ home	At-home dental care brand	₹ 60 lakhs for 2% equity	No deal					—N/a	—N/a	—N/a	—N/a	—N/a	—N/a		—N/a	—N/a	—N/a
49	145		Marbleous	Marble based home decor brand	₹ 75 lakhs for 10% equity	₹ 75 lakhs for 20% equity + 2% royalty until 75 lakhs is recouped					—N/a	—N/a	—N/a	—N/a	—N/a	—N/a	Green checkmark	—N/a	—N/a	—N/a
50	146		Fitkin	Women's active wear brand	₹ 1 crore for 4% equity	₹ 1 crore for 11% equity			Green checkmark	—N/a			—N/a	—N/a	—N/a	—N/a	—N/a	—N/a	—N/a	—N/a
50	147		Kind Fertility	At-home fertility testing kits	₹ 50 lakhs for 2% equity	No deal				—N/a			—N/a	—N/a	—N/a	—N/a	—N/a	—N/a	—N/a	—N/a
50	148		Namo vardan	Cow dung and urine collection devices	₹ 10 lakhs for 5% equity	No deal				—N/a			—N/a	—N/a	—N/a	—N/a	—N/a	—N/a	—N/a	—N/a
51	149	ECOPRENEURS SPECIAL	Circato	Plastic waste based construction solutions	₹ 90 Lakhs for 3% equity	₹ 90 Lakhs for 10% equity			—N/a	Green checkmark	—N/a		—N/a	—N/a	—N/a	—N/a	—N/a	—N/a		—N/a
51	151	ECOPRENEURS SPECIAL	Green Avartan	Solid waste recycling company	₹ 1 Crore for 5% equity	No deal			—N/a		—N/a		—N/a	—N/a	—N/a	—N/a	—N/a	—N/a		—N/a
51	152	ECOPRENEURS SPECIAL	Dharti Amrit	Afforestation initiatives company	₹ 1.5 Crores for 5% equity	No deal			—N/a		—N/a		—N/a	—N/a	—N/a	—N/a	—N/a	—N/a		—N/a
52	153	CAMPUS SPECIAL	Two Words Away	Private event platform	₹ 10 Lakhs for 10% equity	₹ 10 Lakhs for 10% equity	—N/a		—N/a		—N/a	Green checkmark	—N/a	Green checkmark	—N/a	—N/a	—N/a	—N/a	—N/a	Green checkmark
52	154	CAMPUS SPECIAL	Floreal	Crochet gifting brand	₹ 1 Crore for 3% equity	₹ 1 Crore for 8% equity	—N/a		—N/a		—N/a		—N/a	Green checkmark	—N/a	—N/a	—N/a	—N/a	—N/a	Green checkmark
52	155	CAMPUS SPECIAL	MyPerro	Smart pets gps and health tracker	₹ 60 lakhs for 8% equity	No deal	—N/a		—N/a		—N/a		—N/a		—N/a	—N/a	—N/a	—N/a	—N/a	
52	156	CAMPUS SPECIAL	PeerX	Student opportunities platform	₹ 12 lakhs for 10% equity	No deal	—N/a		—N/a		—N/a		—N/a		—N/a	—N/a	—N/a	—N/a	—N/a	

== Beyond the tank ==
Ep. No.	Brand	Idea	Previous appearance	Pre Shark Tank status	Post Shark Tank status
26	Decode Age	Age longevity supplements	Season 3 episode 14	45 crores valuation	150+ hospital chains onboarded, 64% customer retention, 10x growth
26	Home Strap	Home organisers	Season 2 episode 32	100 sq ft manufacturing unit	ARR 100 crores, 900+ SKUs, 60,000 sq ft unit.
26	Honest Home Company (post tank investment)	Eco friendly daily use products	Season 3 episode 1	Monthly sales 1.4 crores, 7,000 sq ft unit.	Monthly sales 7.5 crores, 21,000 sq ft unit, ARR 120 crores.
32	Nish Hair	Hair extensions for women	Season 2 episode 50	Team size 12, MRR 66 lakhs, 55 SKUs	Team size 66, MRR 2.51 Crores, 1,025 SKUs, scaled 6 stores + 1 flagship store in Dubai
32	Gladful	Family friendly protein	Season 2 episode 39	MRR 20 lakhs.	MRR 1.25 crores, Total valuation went up 4x, new manufacturing facility with 5,000 sqft.
32	Creme Castle	Customized cakes and bakery products	Season 3 episode 35	MRR 85 lakhs, 3 kitchens.	MRR 4.7 crores, 37 kitchens, 37,000 central kitchen in Noida.
40	Janitri	Pregnancy monitoring device	Season 2 Episode 12	ARR 2 crores.	ARR 15 crores, 1,000+ hospitals, 5+ countries.
40	The Bear House	D2C mens fashion brand	Season 4 Episode 49	MRR 9 crores, sales online.	MRR 25 crores, sales online + 14 retail stores.
40	Arata	Hair care brand	Season 3 episode 10	MRR 2 crores.	MRR 9 crores, Serving 20K pincodes, 20 lakhs customers.
41	Koparo	Coconut based cleaning products	Season 3 episode 12	EBITDA -35%, MRR 70 lakhs.	EBITDA -9%, MRR 5 crores.
41	The Simply Salad	Healthy salads brand	Season 2 Episode 7	AOV 125, ARR 53 lakhs.	AOV 230, ARR 2.1 crores.
41	Perfora	Oral care products	Season 2 episode 34	MRR 1 crore, 300 daily orders.	MRR 6 crores, 6,000 daily orders.
44	Lets Try	Healthy snacks	Season 1 episode 16	ARR 1.9 crores, Valuation 3.75 crores.	ARR 300 crores, Valuation 1,100 crores.
44	Manetain	Haircare products	Season 2 Episode 25	MRR 10 lakhs, Customers 10 thousands.	MRR 1.2 crores, Customers 4 lakhs.
44	EM5	Perfume brand	Season 2 episode 20	MRR 1.7 crores, Manufacturing unit 6,000 sqft.	MRR 4.5 crores, Manufacturing unit 30,000 sqft.
