= Shark Tank India season 4 =

Fourth season of business reality show Shark Tank India

Shark Tank India
- Season 4
- Starring: See below
- No. of episodes: 52

Release
- Original network: Sony LIV
- Original release: 6 January – 18 March 2025

Season chronology
- ← Previous; Season 3 Next → Season 5

The fourth season of Shark Tank India aired from 6 January 2025 to 18 March 2025.

== Format ==
Apart from the 8 existing Sharks - Aman Gupta, Anupam Mittal, Namita Thapar, Vineeta Singh, Peyush Bansal, Ritesh Agarwal, Azhar Iqubal, Varun Dua. Kunal Bahl and Viraj Bahl were introduced. Aashish Solanki and Sahiba Bali replaced Rahul Dua from the past 2 seasons to host the show in this season. One new shark Chirag Nakrani the founder and managing director of Rayzon Solar was introduced in Finale week.

== Sharks ==
Twelve Entrepreneurs were selected as the sharks for this season, with four of them (Kunal Bahl, Viraj Bahl, Chirag Nakrani and Srikanth Bolla) introduced in this edition. Only Five Sharks will be featured in each episode.

Shark	Company
Aman Gupta	Co-founder and Chief Marketing Officer of boAt Lifestyle
Anupam Mittal	Founder and CEO of Shaadi.com and People Group
Azhar Iqubal	Co-founder and CEO of Inshorts
Namita Thapar	Executive Director of Emcure Pharmaceuticals
Peyush Bansal	Co-founder and CEO of Lenskart
Ritesh Agarwal	CEO and Founder of OYO
Vineeta Singh	CEO and co-founder of SUGAR Cosmetics
Varun Dua	Founder and CEO of ACKO
Kunal Bahl	CoFounder of SnapDeal
Viraj Bahl	Founder and CEO of Veeba
Guests for Finale Week
Chirag Nakrani	Founder and Managing Director of Rayzon Solar
Srikanth Bolla	Founder and Chairman of Bollant Industries

== Pitches and investments by sharks ==
Ep. no.	Pitch no.		Brand	Idea	Original ask	Deal	Investment by											
Ep. no.	Pitch no.		Brand	Idea	Original ask	Deal	Namita Thapar	Aman Gupta	Vineeta Singh	Anupam Mittal	Peyush Bansal	Ritesh Agarwal	Azhar Iqubal	Varun Dua	Kunal Bahl	Viraj Bahl	Chirag Nakrani	Srikanth Bolla
1	1		FAE Beauty	Beauty and skincare products	₹ 1 Crore for 1% equity	₹ 1 Crore for 1.5% equity	Green checkmark	Green checkmark				—N/a	—N/a	—N/a	—N/a	—N/a	—N/a	—N/a
1	2		Confect	Vegan bakery products	₹ 1 Crore for 1% equity	₹ 1 Crore for 2% equity and 2% royalty till 1 Crore is recouped	Green checkmark					—N/a	—N/a	—N/a	—N/a	—N/a	—N/a	—N/a
1	3		Indulge	Digital consierge service for HNI	₹ 50 Lakhs for 1% equity	No deal						—N/a	—N/a	—N/a	—N/a	—N/a	—N/a	—N/a
2	4		BL Fabric	Online designer lehenga brand	₹ 1 Crore for 2% equity	₹ 1 Crore for 5%, if revenue more than 15Cr then 4%				—N/a	—N/a	Green checkmark	—N/a	—N/a	Green checkmark	—N/a	—N/a	—N/a
2	5		Culture Circle	Luxury fashion marketplace	₹ 1.2 Crore for 0.5% equity	₹ 3 Crore for 3% equity				—N/a	—N/a	Green checkmark	—N/a	—N/a	Green checkmark	—N/a	—N/a	—N/a
2	6		Nexera.health	Healthcare platform for corporates	₹ 75 Lakhs for 1% equity	No deal				—N/a	—N/a		—N/a	—N/a		—N/a	—N/a	—N/a
3	7		NOOE	Lifestyle luxury accessories brand	₹ 50 Lakhs for 1% equity	₹ 5 Crore for 51% equity	—N/a				Green checkmark	—N/a	—N/a	—N/a		—N/a	—N/a	—N/a
3	8		Go Zero	Zero sugar icecream brand	₹ 1 Crore for 1% equity	₹ 1 Crore for 1.5% equity	—N/a	Green checkmark				—N/a	—N/a	—N/a		—N/a	—N/a	—N/a
3	9		Curve Electric	Public e-bike sharing system	50 Lakhs for 5% equity	No deal	—N/a					—N/a	—N/a	—N/a		—N/a	—N/a	—N/a
4	10		Gud World	Hygienic jaggery brand	₹ 50 Lakhs for 2% equity	₹ 50 Lakhs for 5% equity	—N/a	Green checkmark				—N/a	—N/a		—N/a	—N/a	—N/a	—N/a
4	11		Airth	AC air purifier brand	₹ 60 Lakhs for 1% equity	₹ 1 Crore for 3.7% equity	—N/a	Green checkmark	Green checkmark			—N/a	—N/a		—N/a	—N/a	—N/a	—N/a
4	12		OneDios	Request booking platform	75 Lakhs for 1.5% equity	No deal	—N/a					—N/a	—N/a		—N/a	—N/a	—N/a	—N/a
5	13		Innergize	Mental health wearable	₹ 54 Lakhs for 1.5% equity	₹ 1 Crore for 4.2% equity	—N/a	Green checkmark		—N/a	—N/a	Green checkmark	Green checkmark	—N/a		—N/a	—N/a	—N/a
5	14		Personal Touch Skincare	Lifestyle skincare brand	₹ 1.5 Crore for 1% equity	No deal	—N/a			—N/a	—N/a			—N/a		—N/a	—N/a	—N/a
5	15		KIWI Kisan Window	One stop solution for experiencing unique flavors of India	₹ 50 Lakhs for 1% equity	₹ 2.5 Crores for 10% equity	—N/a			—N/a	—N/a			—N/a	Green checkmark	—N/a	—N/a	—N/a
6	16		Tripole	Outdoor utility and apparel brand	₹ 1 Crore for 1% equity	₹ 75 Lakhs for 1.15% equity 25 Lakhs debt @ 9% for 5 years.			—N/a		—N/a	Green checkmark	—N/a	—N/a		—N/a	—N/a	—N/a
6	17		NeoSapien	AI powered wearable	₹ 80 Lakhs for 2.5% equity	₹ 80 Lakhs for 4% equity	Green checkmark		—N/a		—N/a		—N/a	—N/a		—N/a	—N/a	—N/a
6	18		Miss Cheesecake	Cheesecake brand	₹ 30 Lakhs for 5% equity	No deal			—N/a		—N/a		—N/a	—N/a		—N/a	—N/a	—N/a
7	19		Speed Kitchen	Co-working cloud kitchen	₹ 2 Crores for 3% equity	₹ 2 Crores for 6% equity	—N/a			—N/a	—N/a	Green checkmark	Green checkmark	—N/a	Green checkmark	—N/a	—N/a	—N/a
7	20		MudgarClub	Mudgar workshop and yrainings	₹ 50 Lakhs for 10% equity	₹ 50 Lakhs for 12.5% equity	—N/a			—N/a	—N/a	Green checkmark		—N/a		—N/a	—N/a	—N/a
7	21		Imagimake	DIY activity and learning kits	₹ 1.5 Crores for 0.5% equity	No deal	—N/a			—N/a	—N/a			—N/a		—N/a	—N/a	—N/a
8	22		Beast Life	Nutrition supplements brand	₹ 1 Crore for 1% equity	No deal	—N/a					—N/a	—N/a	—N/a		—N/a	—N/a	—N/a
8	23		Go Devil	Online fashion brand	₹ 80 Lakhs for 2% equity	No deal	—N/a					—N/a	—N/a	—N/a		—N/a	—N/a	—N/a
8	24		Havintha	Hair and skin care brand	₹ 50 Lakhs for 2% equity	No deal	—N/a					—N/a	—N/a	—N/a		—N/a	—N/a	—N/a
9	25	MATCH OFF	Nurturing Green	Online plant nursery brand	₹ 1 Crore for 1% equity	₹ 50 Lakhs for 1.25% and 50 Lakhs debt @ 10% for 3 years		—N/a	Green checkmark			—N/a	—N/a	—N/a		—N/a	—N/a	—N/a
9	26	MATCH OFF	Kyari	Online plant nursery brand	₹ 80 Lakhs for 0.8% equity	No deal		—N/a				—N/a	—N/a	—N/a		—N/a	—N/a	—N/a
10	27	YOUNG ENTREPRENEURS	Project Clay	Online college counseling	₹ 15 Lakhs for 10% equity	₹ 15 Lakhs for 10% equity	Green checkmark					—N/a	—N/a	—N/a	—N/a'	—N/a	—N/a	—N/a
10	28	YOUNG ENTREPRENEURS	Demi Bikes	Electric bikes	₹ 30 Lakhs for 10% equity	No deal						—N/a	—N/a	—N/a	—N/a'	—N/a	—N/a	—N/a
10	29	YOUNG ENTREPRENEURS	Pretty Little Shopp	Customised gifting brand	₹ 30 Lakhs for 10% equity	No deal						—N/a	—N/a	—N/a	—N/a'	—N/a	—N/a	—N/a
11	30		Aquapeya	Ready to drink beverage brand	₹ 70 Lakhs for 2% equity	₹ 70 Lakhs for 3% equity and 1% royalty until 70 Lakhs is recouped	Green checkmark		—N/a			Green checkmark	—N/a	—N/a	—N/a'	—N/a	—N/a	—N/a
11	31		Jarsh	Industrial safety equipment brand	₹ 50 Lakhs for 1% equity	₹ 50 Lakhs for 1.5% equity		Green checkmark	—N/a				—N/a	—N/a	—N/a'	—N/a	—N/a	—N/a
11	32		DACBY	Recommerce platform for gaming	₹ 75 Lakhs for 2.2% equity	No deal			—N/a				—N/a	—N/a	—N/a'	—N/a	—N/a	—N/a
12	33		Shyle	Handcrafted silver jewellery brand	₹ 70 Lakhs for 1% equity	₹ 70 Lakhs for 1.5% equity and 0.5% royalty until 70 Lakhs is recouped	Green checkmark	—N/a			—N/a	Green checkmark	—N/a	—N/a		—N/a	—N/a	—N/a
12	34		Savani Heritage	Building / monuments restoring company	₹ 3 Crore for 1% equity	₹ 1 Crore for 0.8% equity and 2 Crores debt @ 10% for 3 Years.		—N/a			—N/a	Green checkmark	—N/a	—N/a		—N/a	—N/a	—N/a
12	35		SNEAKINN	Premium bag and shoe care brand	₹ 90 Lakhs for 3% equity	₹ 90 Lakhs for 6.5% equity		—N/a		Green checkmark	—N/a		—N/a	—N/a		—N/a	—N/a	—N/a
13	36		Fupro	Prosthetics company	₹ 60 Lakhs for 1% equity	₹ 60 Lakhs for 4% equity	Green checkmark	Green checkmark	—N/a		—N/a	Green checkmark	—N/a	—N/a		—N/a	—N/a	—N/a
13	37		Kanvas	India art inspired footwear brand	₹ 60 Lakhs for 6% equity	No deal			—N/a		—N/a		—N/a	—N/a		—N/a	—N/a	—N/a
13	38		EZO	Billing devices	₹ 50 Lakhs 1Rs for 0.33% equity	No deal			—N/a		—N/a		—N/a	—N/a		—N/a	—N/a	—N/a
14	39		7 Ring	Payment wearable smart ring	₹ 75 Lakhs for 1% equity	₹ 75 Lakhs for 1.5% equity and 1.5% advisory	—N/a		Green checkmark		Green checkmark	—N/a	—N/a	Green checkmark	—N/a	—N/a	—N/a	—N/a
14	40		The Future Animation	Animation studio	₹ 50 Lakhs for 2.5% equity	₹ 50 Lakhs for 10% equity	—N/a				Green checkmark	—N/a	—N/a		—N/a	—N/a	—N/a	—N/a
14	41		Ai.gnosis	AI diagnosis of autism	₹ 50 Lakhs for 1% equity	₹ 1 Crore for 8% equity	—N/a	Green checkmark			Green checkmark	—N/a	—N/a	Green checkmark	—N/a	—N/a	—N/a	—N/a
15	42		Rosha	Wireless lighting brand	₹ 60 Lakhs for 1% equity	₹ 60 Lakhs for 4% equity and 1.5% royalty until 90 Lakhs is recouped		Green checkmark	—N/a			Green checkmark	—N/a	—N/a	—N/a	—N/a	—N/a	—N/a
15	43		Make My Payment	Automated payment reminder App	₹ 30 Lakhs for 3% equity	No deal			—N/a				—N/a	—N/a	—N/a	—N/a	—N/a	—N/a
15	44		Patchup	Vitamin patches brand	₹ 50 Lakhs for 1.5% equity	₹ 50 Lakhs for 2.27% equity			—N/a	Green checkmark			—N/a	—N/a	—N/a	—N/a	—N/a	—N/a
16	45		Tikitoro	Kids and teens skincare brand	₹ 25 Lakhs for 0.5% equity	₹ 25 Lakhs for 1% equity and 0.5% royalty until 25 Lakhs is recouped	Green checkmark	—N/a				—N/a	—N/a	—N/a		—N/a	—N/a	—N/a
16	46		Fitknees by Ashva	Orthopedic AI wearable sensor system	₹ 50 Lakhs for 1.25% equity	₹ 50 Lakhs for 4% equity		—N/a	Green checkmark			—N/a	—N/a	—N/a		—N/a	—N/a	—N/a
16	47		Aseem Sarees	Ready to wear saree brand	₹ 50 Lakhs for 2.5% equity	₹ 50 Lakhs for 10% equity		—N/a		Green checkmark		—N/a	—N/a	—N/a		—N/a	—N/a	—N/a
17	48		RBD	Agriculture equipment	₹ 1 Crore for 1% equity	₹ 50 Lakhs for 1% equity and 50 Lakhs debt @9% for 5 years	Green checkmark		—N/a		—N/a	Green checkmark	—N/a	—N/a		—N/a	—N/a	—N/a
17	49		Midas Paint	Environment friendly paints	₹ 3 Crores for 5% equity	No deal			—N/a		—N/a		—N/a	—N/a		—N/a	—N/a	—N/a
17	50		Goodland	Pickleball equipments company	₹ 80 Lakhs for 4% equity	₹ 80 Lakhs for 6% equity and royalty 0.5% until 80 Lakhs is recouped		Green checkmark	—N/a		—N/a		—N/a	—N/a		—N/a	—N/a	—N/a
18	51		The Naturik co	Preservative free food brand	₹ 50 Lakhs for 2% equity	₹ 4 Crores for 22.2% equity	—N/a	Green checkmark	Green checkmark	Green checkmark	Green checkmark	—N/a	—N/a	—N/a	Green checkmark	—N/a	—N/a	—N/a
18	52		Metashot	Mixed reality cricket bat	₹ 80 Lakhs for 1.5% equity	₹ 1.6 Crores for 5% equity	—N/a		Green checkmark	Green checkmark		—N/a	—N/a	—N/a		—N/a	—N/a	—N/a
18	53		Gabru Di Chaap	Soyachaap brand	₹ 70 Lakhs for 1% equity	₹ 1.4Crores for 6% equity and 1% royalty until 1.4 Crores is recouped	—N/a		Green checkmark	Green checkmark	Green checkmark	—N/a	—N/a	—N/a		—N/a	—N/a	—N/a
19	54		Yaan Man	Men's makeup brand	₹ 50 Lakhs for 6% equity	₹ 1 Crore for 20% equity		Green checkmark		Green checkmark		—N/a	—N/a	—N/a	—N/a	—N/a	—N/a	—N/a
19	55		The Sonic Lamb	Headphones brand	₹ 50 Lakhs for 1% equity	₹ 50 Lakhs for 1% equity and 1% advisory					Green checkmark	—N/a	—N/a	—N/a	—N/a	—N/a	—N/a	—N/a
19	56		Woolah	Bagless green tea	₹ 50 Lakhs for 1.66% equity	₹ 50 Lakhs for 2.5% equity and 2.5% advisory		Green checkmark				—N/a	—N/a	—N/a	—N/a	—N/a	—N/a	—N/a
20	57		EM5	Perfume brand	₹ 70 Lakhs for 2% equity	₹ 1 Crore for 10% equity	—N/a	Green checkmark				—N/a	—N/a		—N/a	—N/a	—N/a	—N/a
20	58		Women Like U	Ladies swimwear and dress brand	₹ 1 Crore for 2% equity	₹ 1 Crore for 3% equity and 2% royalty until 1 Crore is recouped	—N/a	Green checkmark				—N/a	—N/a		—N/a	—N/a	—N/a	—N/a
20	59		Book Leaf Publishing	Book publishing company	₹ 90 Lakhs for 2% equity	No deal	—N/a					—N/a	—N/a		—N/a	—N/a	—N/a	—N/a
21	60		Str8bat	Deeptech sports company	₹ 1.5 Crore for 1% equity	₹ 1.5 Crore for 3.5% equity	Green checkmark	Green checkmark		—N/a	—N/a		—N/a	—N/a		—N/a	—N/a	—N/a
21	61		Rubys Makeup	Makeup brand	₹ 1 Crore for 2.5% equity	₹ 1 Crore for 8% equity				—N/a	—N/a		—N/a	—N/a	Green checkmark	—N/a	—N/a	—N/a
21	62		The Good Doll	Rag doll company	₹ 50 Lakhs for 5% equity	No deal				—N/a	—N/a		—N/a	—N/a		—N/a	—N/a	—N/a
22	63		Shickwheel	Mobile kitchen and foodtruck manufacturing	₹ 75 Lakhs for 1% equity	No deal	—N/a					—N/a	—N/a	—N/a		—N/a	—N/a	—N/a
22	64		Clapstore toys	Portable busyboards toys company	₹ 80 Lakhs for 4% equity	₹ 1 Crore for 10% equity	—N/a	Green checkmark	Green checkmark	Green checkmark	Green checkmark	—N/a	—N/a	—N/a	Green checkmark	—N/a	—N/a	—N/a
22	65		Raheja Solar food processing	Food processing equipment manufacturers	₹ 50 Lakhs for 1% equity	₹ 1.25 Crores for 3.13% and 1.88 advisory for Kunal ₹ 50 Lakhs for 1.25% and 0.75 advisory for Peyush and Vineeta	—N/a		Green checkmark		Green checkmark	—N/a	—N/a	—N/a	Green checkmark	—N/a	—N/a	—N/a
23	66		Wanderlooms	Adventure apparel for riders	₹ 50 Lakhs for 2.5% equity	₹ 50 Lakhs for 4% equity	Green checkmark		—N/a			Green checkmark	—N/a	—N/a	—N/a	—N/a	—N/a	—N/a
23	67		Ugees	Liquid detergent for undergarments	₹ 50 Lakhs for 2.5% equity	₹ 50 Lakhs for 4% equity			—N/a	Green checkmark			—N/a	—N/a	—N/a	—N/a	—N/a	—N/a
23	68		Alt F co-working	Co-working spaces	₹ 1 Crore for 0.75% equity	No deal			—N/a				—N/a	—N/a	—N/a	—N/a	—N/a	—N/a
24	69		BurgerBae	D2C clothing brand	₹ 1 Crore for 2.5% equity	₹ 2 Crores for 20% equity		Green checkmark	—N/a	Green checkmark	—N/a	—N/a	—N/a	—N/a	Green checkmark		—N/a	—N/a
24	70		Boba Bhai	K-Pop QSR brand	₹ 50 Lakhs for 0.33% equity	₹ 90 Lakhs for 1% equity	Green checkmark		—N/a		—N/a	—N/a	—N/a	—N/a		Green checkmark	—N/a	—N/a
24	71		Hexafun	Lifestyle accessories brand	₹ 1 Crore for 4% equity	No deal			—N/a		—N/a	—N/a	—N/a	—N/a			—N/a	—N/a
25	72		Repeat Gud	Jaggery based food brand	₹ 50 Lakhs for 5% equity	₹ 50 Lakhs for 10% equity on conditional to buy more 5-10% based on per month revenue			—N/a	Green checkmark	—N/a	—N/a	—N/a	—N/a			—N/a	—N/a
25	73		Skate Supply India	Skateboard manufacturing and distribution company	₹ 50 Lakhs for 2% equity	No deal			—N/a		—N/a	—N/a	—N/a	—N/a			—N/a	—N/a
25	74		Utopian	Preservative free beverages	₹ 40 Lakhs for 1.8% equity	No deal			—N/a		—N/a	—N/a	—N/a	—N/a			—N/a	—N/a
26	75		GoFig	Platform for surplus and near expiry products	₹ 50 Lakhs for 2% equity	No deal			—N/a				—N/a	—N/a	—N/a	—N/a	—N/a	—N/a
26	76		JoySpoon	Health mouth freshner brand	₹ 40 Lakhs for 1.5% equity	₹ 40 Lakhs for 2% equity Conditional Offer			—N/a			Green checkmark	—N/a	—N/a	—N/a	—N/a	—N/a	—N/a
26	77		bambinos.live	Live and online English learning company	₹ 1 Crore for 1% equity	₹ 1 Crore for 1.5% equity and 1% royalty till 1 Crore is recouped	Green checkmark		—N/a	Green checkmark		Green checkmark	—N/a	—N/a	—N/a	—N/a	—N/a	—N/a
27	78		Fundoo Labs	Chemistry based DIY toys	₹ 60 Lakhs for 4% equity	₹ 66 Lakhs for 7% equity		Green checkmark		Green checkmark		—N/a	—N/a	—N/a	—N/a	—N/a	—N/a	—N/a
27	79		GAON	Indian cuisine cloud kitchen	₹ 80 Lakhs for 4% equity	₹ 80 Lakhs for 8% equity			Green checkmark	Green checkmark		—N/a	—N/a	—N/a	—N/a	—N/a	—N/a	—N/a
27	80		Eriweave	Eri silk based textile company	₹ 20 Lakhs for 12% equity	₹ 20 Lakhs for 12% equity	Green checkmark			Green checkmark		—N/a	—N/a	—N/a	—N/a	—N/a	—N/a	—N/a
28	81		Paleoo Bakes	Gluten and sugar free cakes	₹ 1 Crore for 6.5% equity	₹ 1 Crore for 9% equity and 1% royalty until 1 Crore is recouped			Green checkmark	Green checkmark		—N/a	—N/a	—N/a	—N/a	—N/a	—N/a	—N/a
28	82		BeeVee by NeuraSim	VR based vision therapy devices	₹ 1 Crore for 8% equity	No deal						—N/a	—N/a	—N/a	—N/a	—N/a	—N/a	—N/a
28	83		Off Mint	High street fashion brand	₹ 10 Rupees for 1% equity	₹ 10 Lakhs for 4% equity	Green checkmark	Green checkmark	Green checkmark	Green checkmark	Green checkmark	—N/a	—N/a	—N/a	—N/a	—N/a	—N/a	—N/a
29	84		Chokhat	Animal inspired home decor brand	₹ 50 Lakhs for 7% equity	₹ 30 Lakhs for 10% equity and 20 Lakhs debt @ 10% interest for 1 year	—N/a			Green checkmark	Green checkmark	—N/a	—N/a	—N/a		—N/a	—N/a	—N/a
29	85		Zenma Coffee	Frozen coffee brand	₹ 60 Lakhs for 3.5% equity	No deal	—N/a					—N/a	—N/a	—N/a		—N/a	—N/a	—N/a
29	86		The EleFant	App based toy library	₹ 60 Lakhs for 1% equity	No deal	—N/a					—N/a	—N/a	—N/a		—N/a	—N/a	—N/a
30	87		GreenDay	Bio fortified food company	₹ 60 Lakhs for 1% equity	₹ 60 Lakhs for 1% equity and 0.5% royalty until 60 Lakhs is recouped	Green checkmark	—N/a				—N/a	—N/a	—N/a		—N/a	—N/a	—N/a
30	88		Pinq Polka	Female hygiene products	₹ 1 Crore for 2.5% equity	No deal		—N/a				—N/a	—N/a	—N/a		—N/a	—N/a	—N/a
30	89		Ayati Devices	Vibrasence- neuropathy based medical devices	₹ 1 Crore for 2% equity	₹ 1 Crore for 4.76% equity	Green checkmark	—N/a			Green checkmark	—N/a	—N/a	—N/a		—N/a	—N/a	—N/a
31	90	CAMPUS SPECIAL	NearBook	Platform for buying and selling used books	₹ 40 Lakhs for 20% equity	₹ 40 Lakhs for 20% equity		—N/a		Green checkmark	—N/a		—N/a	—N/a		—N/a	—N/a	—N/a
31	91	CAMPUS SPECIAL	Memotag	Proactive devices for dementia care	₹ 50 Lakhs for 5% equity	No deal		—N/a			—N/a		—N/a	—N/a		—N/a	—N/a	—N/a
31	92	CAMPUS SPECIAL	Klimate	Cooling vests brand	₹ 54 Lakhs for 3% equity	No deal		—N/a			—N/a		—N/a	—N/a		—N/a	—N/a	—N/a
32	93		HealthFab	Women period panty brand	₹ 1 Crore for 3% equity	₹ 2 Crore for 7% equity		Green checkmark	Green checkmark	Green checkmark	Green checkmark	—N/a	—N/a	—N/a	—N/a	—N/a	—N/a	—N/a
32	94		PieMatrix	Telescope brand	₹ 1 Crore for 3% equity	No deal						—N/a	—N/a	—N/a	—N/a	—N/a	—N/a	—N/a
32	95		Sudhathi	Affordable saree brand	₹ 1 Crore for 1% equity	₹ 1 Crore for 4% equity		Green checkmark		Green checkmark	Green checkmark	—N/a	—N/a	—N/a	—N/a	—N/a	—N/a	—N/a
33	96		Moderate	Health and wellness brand	₹ 50 Lakhs for 1.25% equity	₹ 1 Crore for 5% equity	—N/a	Green checkmark				—N/a	—N/a	—N/a	Green checkmark	—N/a	—N/a	—N/a
33	97		Hire for Care	Premium and special childcare	₹ 36 Lakhs for 3% equity	₹ 36 Lakhs for 5% equity	—N/a	Green checkmark	Green checkmark	Green checkmark	Green checkmark	—N/a	—N/a	—N/a	Green checkmark	—N/a	—N/a	—N/a
33	98		Dreamsmiles Veneers	Tooth veneers	₹ 80 Lakhs for 6% equity	No deal	—N/a					—N/a	—N/a	—N/a		—N/a	—N/a	—N/a
34	99		MadMix	Baked snacks	₹ 50 Lakhs for 1% equity	₹ 50 Lakhs for 5% equity				—N/a	—N/a	Green checkmark	—N/a	—N/a		—N/a	—N/a	—N/a
34	100		Palmonas	Demi fine jewellery	₹ 1.26 Crores for 1% equity	₹ 1.26 Crores for 1% equity and 0.5% royalty until 1.26 Crores are recouped	Green checkmark			—N/a	—N/a	Green checkmark	—N/a	—N/a		—N/a	—N/a	—N/a
34	101		MK	3 wheeler EV vehicles	₹ 3.5 Crores for 5% equity	No deal				—N/a	—N/a		—N/a	—N/a		—N/a	—N/a	—N/a
35	102		Nidhis Grandma Secret	Natural herb haircare brand	₹ 70 Lakhs for 2% equity	₹ 70 Lakhs for 5% equity and 1% royalty until 70 Lakhs are recouped	—N/a			Green checkmark		—N/a	—N/a	—N/a		—N/a	—N/a	—N/a
35	103		Solnce	One stop solar app	₹ 1 Crore for 1.5% equity	₹ 1 Crore for 2.5% equity	—N/a	Green checkmark				—N/a	—N/a	—N/a		—N/a	—N/a	—N/a
35	104		Born Good	Plant based home cleaner brand	₹ 70 Lakhs for 1% equity	No Deal	—N/a					—N/a	—N/a	—N/a		—N/a	—N/a	—N/a
36	105		Dorabi and Amili	Handdyed fashion brand	₹ 75 Lakhs for 3% equity	₹ 1 Crore for 4% equity		Green checkmark	—N/a	Green checkmark	—N/a		—N/a	—N/a		—N/a	—N/a	—N/a
36	106		Zebralearn	Books platform	₹ 1 Crore for 0.8% equity	₹ 1 Crore for 1.6% equity			—N/a		—N/a	Green checkmark	—N/a	—N/a		—N/a	—N/a	—N/a
36	107		ExclusiveLane	Home decor and kitchen essentials	₹ 50 Lakhs for 1% equity	No deal			—N/a		—N/a		—N/a	—N/a		—N/a	—N/a	—N/a
37	108		Medial	Professional social network	₹ 50 Lakhs for 1% equity	₹ 50 Lakhs for 2.5% equity			—N/a		—N/a	Green checkmark	—N/a	—N/a		—N/a	—N/a	—N/a
37	109		Panchal Dairy	Goat and sheep cheese brand	₹ 20 Lakhs for 10% equity	No deal			—N/a		—N/a		—N/a	—N/a		—N/a	—N/a	—N/a
37	110		Music Pandit	Online music coaching	₹ 50 Lakhs for 1% equity	No deal			—N/a		—N/a		—N/a	—N/a		—N/a	—N/a	—N/a
38	111		Cograd	AI powered teaching assistant for schools	₹ 1 Crore for 2% equity	₹ 50 Lakhs for 6% equity and 50 Lakhs debt @ 9% interest for 3 Years	Green checkmark	—N/a	Green checkmark		—N/a	Green checkmark	—N/a	—N/a		—N/a	—N/a	—N/a
38	112		EatBetter	Millet based snacking brand	₹ 50 Lakhs for 0.5% equity	₹ 50 Lakhs for 0.5% equity and 1% royalty till 50 Lakhs is recouped	Green checkmark	—N/a			—N/a		—N/a	—N/a		—N/a	—N/a	—N/a
38	113		Earthful	Nature based nutrition brand	₹ 75 Lakhs for 1% equity	₹ 75 Lakhs for 2.5% equity		—N/a			—N/a	Green checkmark	—N/a	—N/a		—N/a	—N/a	—N/a
39	114		Trajectory	Travel pillow brand	₹ 1 Crore for 2% equity	₹ 50 Lakhs for 3% equity and 50 Lakhs debt @ 8% interest for 3 Years			—N/a			Green checkmark	—N/a	—N/a	—N/a	—N/a	—N/a	—N/a
39	115		Kavi	Upcycled art brand	₹ 60 Lakhs for 1% equity	No Deal			—N/a				—N/a	—N/a	—N/a	—N/a	—N/a	—N/a
39	116		F2DF	Online marketplace for farmers	₹ 50 Lakhs for 1% equity	₹ 5 Lakhs for 2% equity and 45 Lakhs debt @ 10% interest for 2 Years		Green checkmark	—N/a				—N/a	—N/a	—N/a	—N/a	—N/a	—N/a
40	117		Sugarstrings.ai	DNA based preventive tests	₹ 1 Crore for 2.5% equity	No deal	—N/a			—N/a	—N/a			—N/a		—N/a	—N/a	—N/a
40	118		MomsHome	Organic cotton made baby apparels brand	₹ 75 Lakhs for 1% equity	₹ 75 Lakhs for 2% equity and 1% royalty until 93.75 lakhs is recouped	—N/a		Green checkmark	—N/a	—N/a			—N/a		—N/a	—N/a	—N/a
40	119		Catwalk	Non alcoholic spirits brand	₹ 1 Crore for 4.16% equity	No deal	—N/a			—N/a	—N/a			—N/a		—N/a	—N/a	—N/a
41	120		BeautyWise	Skin and Hair nutrition brand	₹ 1 Crore for 1.5% equity	₹ 3 Crores for 6% equity		Green checkmark		—N/a	—N/a		—N/a	—N/a		—N/a	—N/a	—N/a
41	121		Ivory	Neuroscience based gaming app for cognitive impairment	₹ 50 Lakhs for 1.25% equity	₹ 50 Lakhs for 5% equity	Green checkmark			—N/a	—N/a		—N/a	—N/a		—N/a	—N/a	—N/a
41	122		The House Part by Savar	Luxury catering company	₹ 1 Crore for 5% equity	₹ 50 Lakhs for 5% equity and 50 Lakhs debt @ 8% interest for 3 Years				—N/a	—N/a	Green checkmark	—N/a	—N/a		—N/a	—N/a	—N/a
42	123		Glow Glossary	Matcha tea brand	₹ 60 Lakhs for 4% equity	No deal		—N/a			—N/a		—N/a	—N/a		—N/a	—N/a	—N/a
42	124		Singh Dental care	Dental clinic chain	₹ 1 Crore for 5% equity	No deal		—N/a			—N/a		—N/a	—N/a		—N/a	—N/a	—N/a
42	125		Tribalveda	Jamun products	₹ 50 Lakhs for 2% equity	₹ 50 Lakhs for 2.8% equity 2.2% advisory equity		—N/a			—N/a	Green checkmark	—N/a	—N/a		—N/a	—N/a	—N/a
43	126		Anuvad	E-Textile Brand	₹ 50 Lakhs for 5% equity	No deal		—N/a			—N/a		—N/a	—N/a		—N/a	—N/a	—N/a
43	127		Fitelo	Weight loss platform	₹ 1.5 Crores for 0.5% equity	₹ 1.5 Crores for 1% equity and 1% royalty until 1.5 Crores is recouped	Green checkmark	—N/a	Green checkmark		—N/a		—N/a	—N/a		—N/a	—N/a	—N/a
43	128		Nanighar	App based food service	₹ 1 Crore for 5% equity	No deal		—N/a			—N/a		—N/a	—N/a		—N/a	—N/a	—N/a
44	129		Good Monk	Nutrition Mix brand	₹ 1 Crore for 1.67% equity	₹ 50 Lakhs for 1% equity and 0.25% advisory equity + 50 Lakhs debt @ 10% interest for 3 years	—N/a		Green checkmark	—N/a	—N/a			—N/a		—N/a	—N/a	—N/a
44	130		artbuzz	Youth hotels and dormitories	₹ 1 Crore for 3% equity	No deal	—N/a			—N/a	—N/a			—N/a		—N/a	—N/a	—N/a
44	131		Tulua	Indian spices brand	₹ 50 Lakhs for 2% equity	No deal	—N/a			—N/a	—N/a			—N/a		—N/a	—N/a	—N/a
45	132		Taffykids	Trendy kidswear brand	₹ 75 Lakhs for 1% equity	₹ 75 Lakhs for 1.5% equity and 0.5% royalty until 75 Lakhs are recouped			Green checkmark	—N/a	—N/a	Green checkmark	—N/a	—N/a		—N/a	—N/a	—N/a
45	133		Whale Wearable	Self defence wearables	₹ 30 Lakhs for 3% equity	₹ 30 Lakhs for 3% equity		Green checkmark	Green checkmark	—N/a	—N/a		—N/a	—N/a		—N/a	—N/a	—N/a
45	134		ZingaVita	Ayurvedic Supplement brand	₹ 1 Crore for 1.25% equity	No deal				—N/a	—N/a		—N/a	—N/a		—N/a	—N/a	—N/a
45	135		Dhaagalife	Nature based lifestyle brand	₹ 75 Lakhs for 1% equity	No deal				—N/a	—N/a		—N/a	—N/a		—N/a	—N/a	—N/a
46	136		Tileskraft	Marketplace for tiles dealer	₹ 60 Lakhs for 12% equity	No deal	—N/a					—N/a	—N/a	—N/a		—N/a	—N/a	—N/a
46	137		Krishnasakhi	Jewellery for God idols	₹ 37.5 Lakhs for 2.5% equity	No deal	—N/a					—N/a	—N/a	—N/a		—N/a	—N/a	—N/a
46	138		Bore Charger	Robotic water harvesting system	₹ 75 Lakhs for 1.5% equity	No deal	—N/a					—N/a	—N/a	—N/a		—N/a	—N/a	—N/a
47	139		SuperBolter	Home Interior design platform	₹ 75 Lakhs for 0.5% equity	No deal	—N/a					—N/a	—N/a	—N/a		—N/a	—N/a	—N/a
47	140		Hive School	Sales focused online business school	₹ 60 Lakhs for 5% equity	No deal	—N/a					—N/a	—N/a	—N/a		—N/a	—N/a	—N/a
47	141		Tint Box	Kitchen container brand	₹ 70 Lakhs for 5% equity	No deal	—N/a					—N/a	—N/a	—N/a		—N/a	—N/a	—N/a
48	142		EasyRugs	Online Rugs brand	₹ 35 Lakhs for 5% equity	₹ 35 Lakhs for 5% equity and 5% royalty until 52 lakhs is recouped		Green checkmark	Green checkmark			—N/a	—N/a	—N/a	—N/a	—N/a	—N/a	—N/a
48	143		Stylestry	Affordable women's footwear brand	₹ 50 Lakhs for 1% equity	No deal						—N/a	—N/a	—N/a	—N/a	—N/a	—N/a	—N/a
48	144		QuitCi	Quit smoking brand	₹ 50 Lakhs for 2% equity	No deal						—N/a	—N/a	—N/a	—N/a	—N/a	—N/a	—N/a
49	145		Fit Feast	Tasty protein brand	₹ 1 Crore for 6.5% equity	₹ 1 Crores for 18% equity			—N/a	Green checkmark	—N/a	—N/a	—N/a	—N/a		Green checkmark	—N/a	—N/a
49	146		The Bear House	D2C men's fashion brand	₹ 3 Crores for 1% equity	₹ 1 Crores for 1% equity and 2 Crores debt @10% for 5 years	Green checkmark		—N/a		—N/a	—N/a	—N/a	—N/a			—N/a	—N/a
49	147		Urban Animal	Genetic tests for pets	₹ 45 Lakhs for 5% equity	No deal			—N/a		—N/a	—N/a	—N/a	—N/a			—N/a	—N/a
50	148		Nooky	Sexual wellness brand	₹ 60 Lakhs for 1% equity	No deal	—N/a					—N/a	—N/a		—N/a	—N/a	—N/a	—N/a
50	149		Subculture	Fetish fashion brand	₹ 50 Lakhs for 7% equity	No deal			—N/a		—N/a		—N/a	—N/a		—N/a	—N/a	—N/a
50	150		Woodsmen	Himalayan Whiskey brand	₹ 1.5 Crores for 0.5% equity	No deal	—N/a			—N/a	—N/a			—N/a		—N/a	—N/a	—N/a
51	151	ECOPRENEURS SPECIAL	Bhavisya plasts	Bio degradeable plastic manufacturing company	₹ 50 Lakhs for 1.5% equity	₹ 2 Crores for 10% equity	Green checkmark	Green checkmark	—N/a	Green checkmark	—N/a		—N/a	—N/a	—N/a	—N/a	Green checkmark	—N/a
51	152	ECOPRENEURS SPECIAL	ECOIL	Bio fuel manufacturing company	₹ 1 Crore for 1.25% equity	₹ 50 Lakhs for 1% equity and 0.6% advisory equity with 50 Lakhs debt @ 9% for 3 years			—N/a		—N/a	Green checkmark	—N/a	—N/a	—N/a	—N/a	Green checkmark	—N/a
51	153	ECOPRENEURS SPECIAL	Rescript	Sustainable Stationery	₹ 1 Crore for 3.33% equity	No deal			—N/a		—N/a		—N/a	—N/a	—N/a	—N/a		—N/a
52	154	DIVYANG SPECIAL	Tickle your art	Stationary and accessories brand	₹ 21.3 Lakhs for 7% equity	₹ 21.3 Lakhs for 7% equity		Green checkmark	—N/a	Green checkmark	—N/a	—N/a	—N/a	—N/a	—N/a	—N/a		
52	155	DIVYANG SPECIAL	Symbionic	Prosthetic brand	₹ 80 Lakhs for 2% equity	₹ 40 Lakhs for 1% equity and 1% advisory equity with 40 Lakhs debt @ 10% for 3 years	Green checkmark		—N/a		—N/a	—N/a	—N/a	—N/a	—N/a	—N/a		
52	156	DIVYANG SPECIAL	XL Cinemas	Mobile app for audio description is cinema	₹ 1.5 Crores for 1.5% equity	No deal			—N/a		—N/a	—N/a	—N/a	—N/a	—N/a	—N/a		
Investment (in Cr. ₹)							₹ 10.79	₹ 17.61	₹ 8.43	₹ 22.32	₹ 9.87	₹ 12.85	₹ 1	₹ 0.58	₹ 11	₹ 0.95	₹ 0.75	₹ 0
Number of Deals Made							25	32	21	27	15	26	2	2	11	2	2	0

== Beyond the tank ==
Ep. No.	Brand	Idea	Previous appearance	Pre Shark Tank status	Post Shark Tank status
2	Dil Foods	Virtual restaurant service	Season 3 episode 5	Team size 7, 2,000 orders per day, 75 Crores valuation	Team size 70, 26,000 orders per day, 380 Crores valuation
10	Arata	Hair care brand	Season 3 episode 10	Revenue 1.6 Crores a month, team size of 25.	Revenue of 8 Crores a month. 12x Increase, Team size of 75. Total valuation went up 4x.
15	First Bud Organics	Organic products	Season 3 episode 48	Revenue 15 Lakhs, 1,000 units	Revenue 60 Lakhs, 20,000 units
20	Proxgy	VR headset for workers	Season 1 episode 33	10 Crores valuation	400 Crores valuation
25	Zoff	Spices	Season 2 episode 28	80 Crores valuation, 4.5 Crores online sales	250 Crores valuation, 9 Crores online sales
30	Winston	Salon and home appliances	Season 2 episode 5	Revenue 40 Lakhs	9,000 orders in 12 hours, revenue 2.5 Crores, 8x growth
35	Stage	Vernacular OTT plattform	Season 2 episode 3	Valuation 20 Crores	Valuation 3x, 600 Crores revenue
40	Hair originals	Hair extensions brand	Season 1 episode 22	Valuation 15 Crores	Valuation 10x 150 Crores, revenue 1.5 Crores per month
44	Adil Qadri	Perfume and Attar brand	Season 3 episode 1	7 stores	31 Stores, 11 Crores sales per month
50	Humpy A2	Organic milk products	Season 1 episode 28	Revenue 4 Crores, breakeven per month	Revenue 32 Crores, 9% PAT
