= Shark Tank India =

Indian business reality television series

- Theme still of the Sharks from Season 4
- Genre: Reality television
- Based on: Shark Tank
- Directed by: Nishant Nayak
- Presented by: Rannvijay Singh (season 1); Rahul Dua (seasons 2–3); Aashish Solanki and Sahiba Bali (season 4); Aaditya Kulshreshth (season 5)
- Starring: see below
- Country of origin: India
- Original language: Hindi
- No. of seasons: 5
- No. of episodes: 243

Production
- Producer: Satyajeet Talwadekar
- Production locations: Mumbai, Maharashtra
- Camera setup: Multiple-camera
- Running time: 60 minutes
- Production companies: Studio NEXT; Sony Pictures Television

Original release
- Network: Sony Entertainment Television (2021-2026); Sony LIV
- Release: 20 December 2021 – present

Shark Tank India is an Indian Hindi-language business reality television series that airs on Sony LIV and Sony Entertainment Television. The show is the Indian franchise of the American show Shark Tank. It shows entrepreneurs making business presentations to a panel of investors or sharks, who decide whether to invest in their company.

Season 1 aired on Sony LIV and Sony Entertainment Television from 20 December 2021 to 4 February 2022. The gateway episode aired on 11 February 2022. Rannvijay Singh is the presenter of Shark Tank India for season 1.

Season 2 aired on Sony LIV and Sony Entertainment Television from 2 January 2023 to 10 March 2023. The second season featured Amit Jain, CEO and co-founder of CarDekho group, InsuranceDekho.com as a new shark. Rahul Dua was the host of the season. The gateway episode aired on 13 March 2023 that featured guest shark (i.e. angel investor) Vikas D Nahar, Founder & CEO of Happilo.

Season 3 aired on Sony LIV and Sony Entertainment Television from 22 January 2024 to 31 March 2024. This season featured the addition of six distinguished sharks to the panel: Deepinder Goyal, Founder and CEO, Zomato; Azhar Iqubal, Co-founder & CEO, InShorts; Ritesh Agarwal, Founder & CEO, OYO Rooms; Radhika Gupta, MD & CEO, Edelweiss MF; Varun Dua, Founder, ACKO, and Ronnie Screwvala; Co-founder and Chairperson, UpGrad. The gateway episode aired on 30 March 2024 and Ecopreneur special episode aired on 31 March 2024. Rahul Dua is the presenter of Shark Tank India for season 2 and 3.

Season 4 aired on Sony LIV and Sony Entertainment Television from 6 January 2025 to 18 March 2025. This season featured the addition of three distinguished sharks to the panel: Kunal Bahl, co-founder of Snapdeal and Titan Capital and Viraj Bahl, founder and CEO of Veeba, and Chirag Nakrani, Founder and Managing Director of Rayzon Solar. Sahiba Bali and Aashish Solanki replaced Dua as the presenters of Shark Tank India Season 4. The season concluded with a special episode featuring pitches presented by (or supporting) the disabled, with Srikanth Bolla, founder of Bollant Industries, joining the panel of sharks.

Season 5 aired on Sony LIV and Sony Entertainment Television from 5 January 2026. Shark Tank India Season 5 is hosted by Aditya Kulshreshth.

== Concept ==
The show features a panel of potential investors or angel investors, termed as "Sharks", who listen to entrepreneurs' pitch ideas for a business or product they wish to develop. These self-made multi-millionaires judge the business concepts and products pitched and then decide whether to invest their money to help market and mentor each contestant.

== Series overview ==
Series	Episodes	Originally released	
Series	Episodes	First released	Last released
1	36	20 December 2021	11 February 2022
2	51	2 January 2023	13 March 2023
3	52	22 January 2024	31 March 2024
4	52	6 January 2025	18 March 2025
5	52	5 January 2026	17 March 2026

== Timeline of sharks ==
Sharks	Seasons				
Sharks	1	2	3	4	5
Anupam Mittal	Main				
Aman Gupta	Main				
Vineeta Singh	Main				
Namita Thapar	Main				
Peyush Bansal	Main				
Ashneer Grover	Main				
Ghazal Alagh	Main				
Amit Jain		Main			Main
Vikas D Nahar (Note: Nahar appeared as a guest shark in the gateway episode that aired on 13 March 2023.)		Guest			
Ritesh Agarwal			Main		
Azhar Iqubal			Main		
Varun Dua			Main		
Radhika Gupta			Main		
Deepinder Goyal			Guest		
Ronnie Screwvala			Guest		
Kunal Bahl				Main	
Viraj Bahl				Main	
Chirag Nakrani				Guest	
Srikanth Bolla (Note: Bolla appeared as a guest shark in the final episode of the season, focusing on persons with disabilities.)				Guest	
Mohit Yadav					Main
Varun Alagh					Main
Kanika Tekriwal					Main
Shaily Mehrotra					Main
Shrisharaj Bhat					Guest
Pratham Mittal					Guest
Hardik Kothiya					Guest
