= Bira 91 =

Indian craft beer

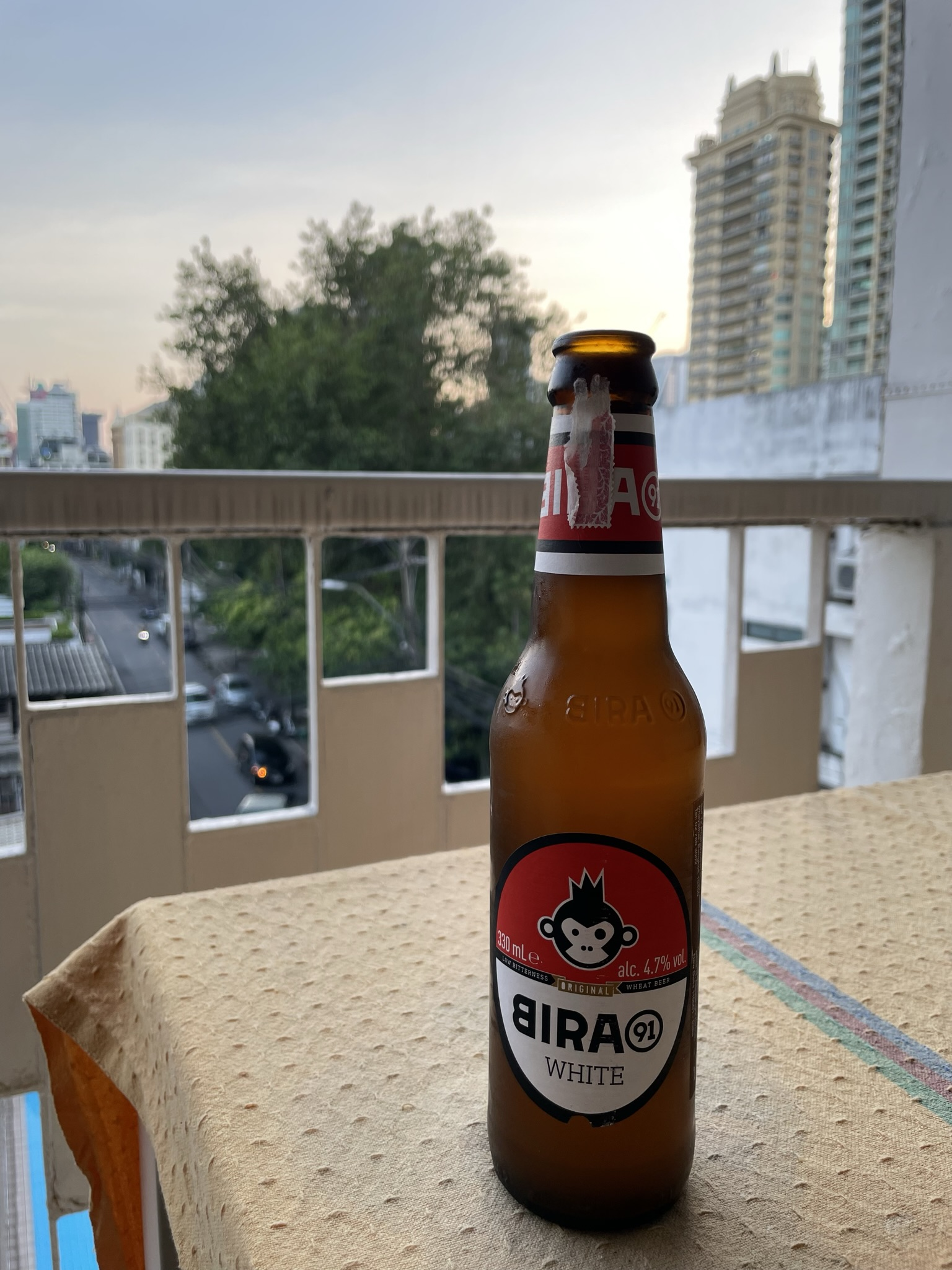
- Type: Craft beer
- Manufacturer: B9 Beverages Pvt. Ltd.
- Origin: India
- Introduced: 2015
- Alcohol by volume: 4% to 7%
- Variants: Bira 91 White, Bira 91 Blonde, Bira 91 Light, Bira 91 Strong, Bira 91 Bira Boom The IPA
- Website: bira91.com

Bira 91 is an Indian craft beer brand manufactured by B9 Beverages Pvt. Ltd., launched in 2015. Made from wheat, barley and hops, the beer is available in draft, 330ml, 650ml bottles and 500ml cans.

== History ==
B9 Beverages Pvt Ltd was founded by Ankur Jain, an entrepreneur who moved from India to the United States in 1998. Jain completed his degree in Computer Science from Illinois Institute of Technology, Chicago. He briefly worked with Motorola before starting his first venture in Healthcare Revenue Management in New York which was later sold to an undisclosed healthcare provider network in 2007.

Jain moved back to India and started his first beer venture in 2008; which was importing traditional craft beers from Europe and US to India. B9 Beverages launched Bira 91 beer in early 2015.

The company's first brewery unit was located in Flanders region of Belgium, where a craft distillery was used to contract manufacture the beer with ingredients from France, Belgium, Himalayas and Bavarian Farms and the beer was imported to India. After initial success, the company thereafter began manufacturing the beer in India with the same ingredients.

== Variants ==
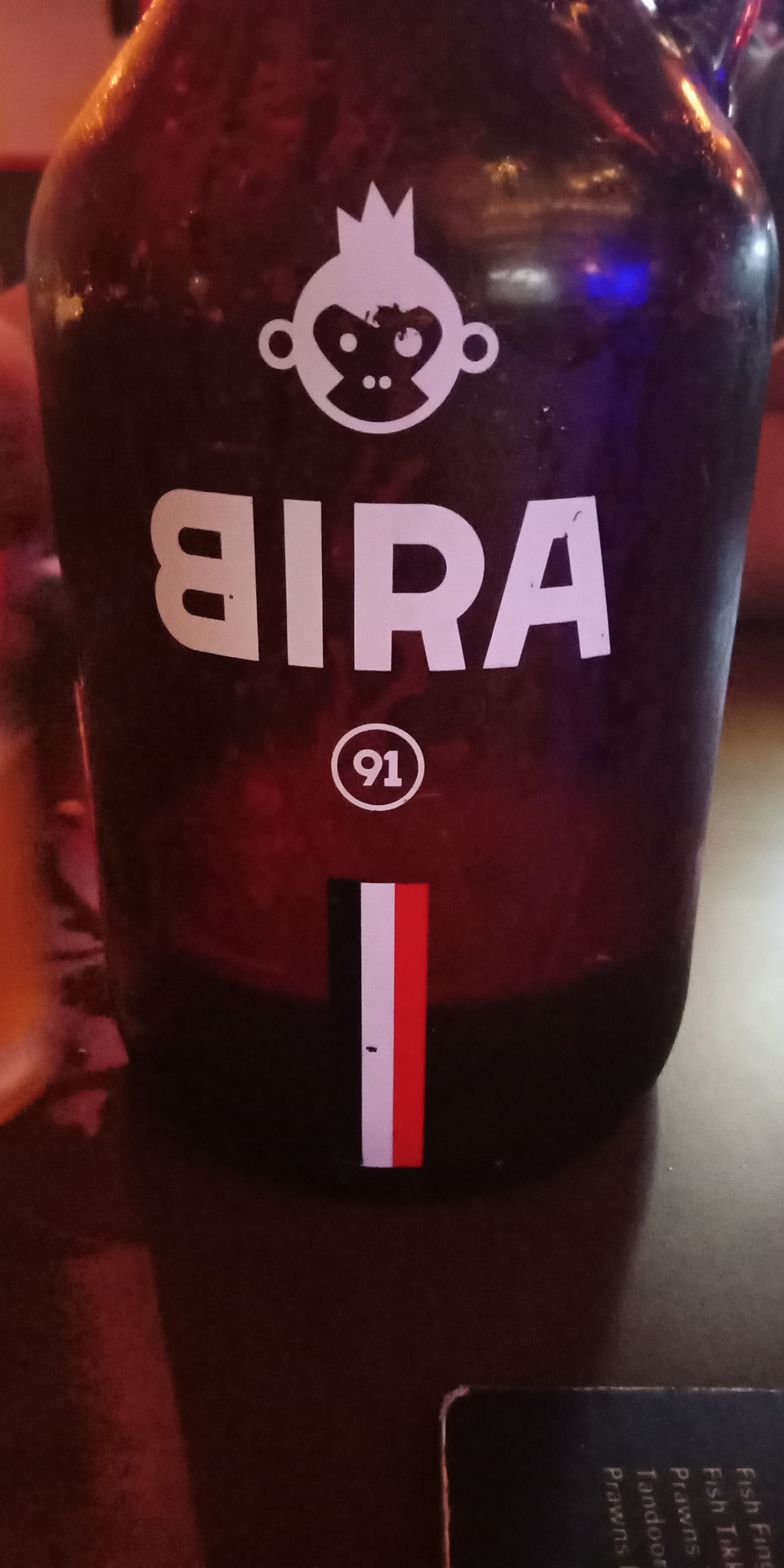
A bottle of Bira beer

The company has five beers in its portfolio - Bira 91 White (a low bitterness wheat beer with alcohol content of 4%), Bira 91 Blonde (an extra hoppy craft lager), Bira 91 Light (a low calorie lunchtime lager), Bira 91 Strong (a high intensity wheat beer with a higher percentage of alcohol content at 7%), and The Bira 91 Indian Pale Ale (the first IPA brewed and bottled in India).

Light and Strong were introduced in June 2017 and IPA was introduced in October 2017.

Bira 91 White is a cloudy wheat beer with low bitterness and high aromas like citrus and coriander; while Bira 91 Blonde is a clear lager made from barley and saaz hops; Bira 91 White measures 13 while Bira 91 Blonde comes 21 on the IBU scale (International Bitterness Unit). Both the variants have strength of 4.9% Alcohol by Volume.

== Marketing ==
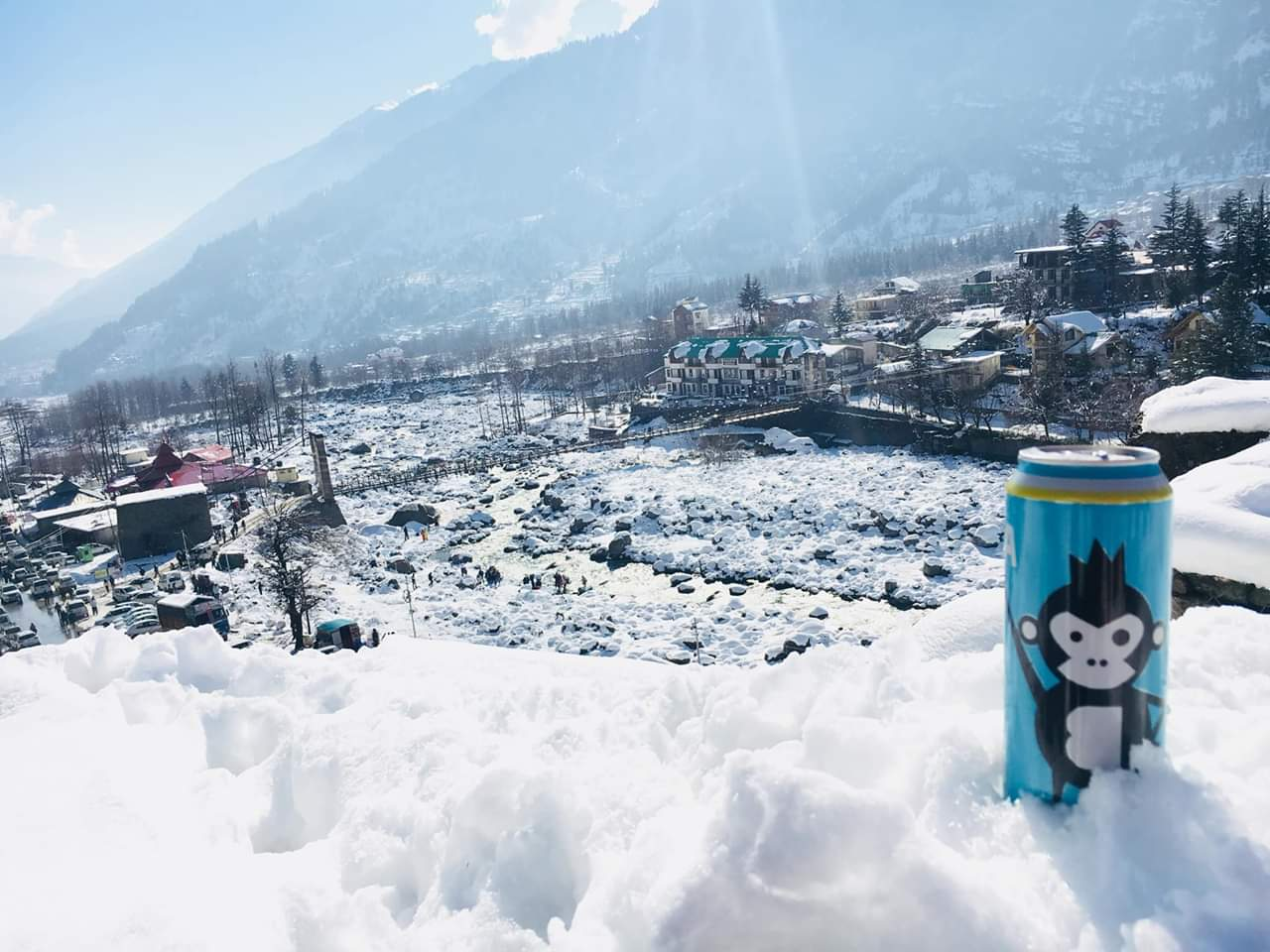
A can of Bira in Manali

Bira 91 garnered unprecedented success amongst Indians due to its distinct taste that is low on the expected bitterness of beer. Indian restaurant and bar owners saw a rise in Bira 91's demand soon upon its launch as the beer brand captured sizeable market share basis word of mouth publicity, without leveraging traditional marketing campaigns initially.

Bira 91 offered a distinct taste to beer drinkers in India and witnessed unexpected demand upon its launch. However, due to beer being made in Belgium and it being imported to India, Bira 91 had erratic supplies and due to a major supply crunch in 2016, it went off shelves for a while.

Bira 91 made its International debut in New York City at the Tribeca Film Festival 2016 where it was the chief sponsor of beer. It claims to be the first craft beer from India to be sold in New York.

In 2017, Bira 91 produced Bira 91 Hot Stuff, an eight-episode travelogue that covers the hottest chillis and cuisines across India. The company has also collaborated with Saavn to launch a Bira 91 Hip Hop Channel on Saavn.

Apart from the Tribeca Film Festival in 2016, Bira 91 sponsored the Global Citizen Festival in 2017. In India there was also Bira 91 FreeFlow, a 3 city tour with hip hop artist Lady Leshurr.

In May 2018, Bira 91 was the beer for the month of May at the United Nations global headquarters in New York.

As of June 2018, Bira 91 is available in India, USA, UK, and Singapore, Hong Kong, Thailand, and UAE.

In November 2018, Bira 91 announced its global sponsorship for the Cricket World Cup and various other ICC events.

== Brand ==
The name Bira sounds similar to beer in Italian (Birra) and colloquially it is what North Indians would call their brother or friend, and 91 represents India's Country Code. The reverse B in the logo represents a spirit of irreverence. The monkey mascot was designed to present the brand with a playful identity to the urban millennial consumer.

In 2017, Bira 91 launched its brand merchandise that includes T-shirts, growlers, bags, ice bucket and beer mugs.

== Funding ==
Ankur Jain raised $1.5 million (₹12.45 crores) from a group of friends when he had initially started B9 Beverages Pvt. Ltd. In January 2016, B9 Beverages Pvt Ltd received its first round of funding with $6 million (₹49.8 crores) from Sequoia Capital (which was Sequoia's first investment in the Alcohol Beverage segment). This Series A funding also saw participation from Angel investors of India like Kunal Bahl and Rohit Bansal (Co-founders - Snapdeal), Deepinder Goyal (Zomato), Ashish Dhawan (ChrysCapital) and Mayank Singhal.

In 2018, the company raised a further amount of $50 million from Sofina, a Belgian family owned fund and its existing investors.

In May 2019, Bira 91 raised the funding of $4.3M from Sixth Sense Ventures in its Pre-Series C round.

Bira raised $10 million in debt funding, to increase production capacity from 400,000 cases to 1.7 million cases.

In January 2021, Bira 91 raised $30 million from Japan's Kirin Holdings.
