= Amit Jain =

Indian entrepreneur and investor

- Born: Jaipur, Rajasthan,
- Education: IIT Delhi
- Occupations: Entrepreneur; Businessperson; Investor
- Organization: CarDekho Group
- Television: Shark Tank India (2023–2024)

Amit Jain is an Indian entrepreneur and angel investor. He is the co-founder and CEO of GirnarSoft, which is the parent company of CarDekho Group. He was a judge and investor in Sony Entertainment television's business reality show Shark Tank India in seasons 2, 3 and 5.

== Early life and education ==
Amit Jain was born on 12th November 1976 in Jaipur, Rajasthan. He attended St. Xavier's Senior Secondary School, Jaipur, and later earned a Bachelor of Technology degree in Electrical Engineering from the Indian Institute of Technology (IIT) Delhi in 1999.

== Career ==
=== Early career ===
After completing his studies, Jain worked at Tata Consultancy Services and later joined Trilogy, a software company based in Austin, Texas. He worked at Trilogy for several years in various roles related to product development and management.

=== Entrepreneurship ===
In 2006, Amit Jain returned to India and along with his brother Anurag Jain established GirnarSoft, an IT outsourcing company based in Jaipur. In 2008, the brothers launched CarDekho after attending the Auto Expo in New Delhi. The platform was created to help users compare vehicles and access automotive content. Under Amit Jain's leadership, the CarDekho Group expanded into related verticals, both domestic including BikeDekho, CollegeDekho, InsuranceDekho, Zigwheels and rupyy, a digital lending platform and overseas projects. The company raised multiple rounds of funding from investors such as Peak XV Partners, Hillhouse Capital, and Ratan Tata Trust. In 2021, it was reported that CarDekho achieved unicorn status with a valuation of over $1 billion.

=== Television ===
Jain joined the Indian business reality television series Shark Tank India as an investor during its second season. He joined the panel alongside Vineeta Singh, Anupam Mittal, Peyush Bansal, Namita Thapar, and Aman Gupta, who had been part of the show since its first season. Jain appeared as a judge in both the second and third seasons.
