= Delhi Public School, R. K. Puram =

Public school in Delhi, India

Delhi Public School, RK Puram

Location
- R. K. Puram; South Delhi, Delhi, 110022; India; 28°34′15.51″N 77°10′33.77″E

Information
- Type: Private school
- Motto: Service Before Self
- Established: 29 January 1972
- Chairman: V. K. Shunglu
- Principal: Anil Kumar
- Faculty: Full Time: 221
- Area: 12 acres (49,000 m^{2})
- Colors: White and Bottle Green
- Nickname: "Dipsites"
- Affiliations: Central Board of Secondary Education
- Website: www.dpsrkp.net

Delhi Public School, R. K. Puram (often referred to as DPS R. K. Puram or RKP) is a co-educational day and private boarding school educating pupils from 6th to 12th grade, located in R. K. Puram in the South Delhi district of Delhi, India. It was founded in 1972 and was the second Delhi Public School to be established after Delhi Public School, Mathura Road.

D.P.S. R. K. Puram is affiliated to the Central Board of Secondary Education (CBSE) and also offers the IB Diploma Program. It is recognised by the Department of Education, Government of Delhi, and the Ministry of HRD, Government of India. It is also a member of the Indian Public Schools' Conference (IPSC) and the National Progressive Schools' Conference (NPSC).

== Campus ==
The school is a day and boarding school with 9,500 students on its rolls. It is situated in the South Delhi disctrict's urban area and has a campus of over 12 acres, along with a separate sports campus spread over 6 acres.

Hostel accommodation is also provided to more than 400 boarders from across the country. The hostel facility is separate for boys and girls.

== Notable alumni ==
- Neha Aggarwal, table tennis player
- Kunal Bahl, co-founder and former CEO of Snapdeal
- Rohit Bansal, co-founder and COO of Snapdeal
- Harsh Chitale, previous CEO of HCL Infosystems
- Indrani Dasgupta, Bollywood actor and model.
- Ankit Fadia, host of MTV What the Hack!
- Sagarika Ghose, Indian Member of Parliament, journalist, columnist and author
- Aman Gupta, co-founder and CMO of Boat Lifestyle
- Randeep Hooda, actor
- Vineet Malhotra, TV anchor and sports personality
- Kinjarapu Ram Mohan Naidu, Minister of Civil Aviation, Government of India
- Raghuram Rajan, 23rd Governor of the Reserve Bank of India
- Manavjit Singh Sandhu, sport shooter
- Kriti Sanon, actress
- Ruchir Sharma, investor and fund manager
- Vineeta Singh, co-founder and CEO of Sugar Cosmetics
- Shweta Tripathi, Bollywood actress
- Tejashwi Yadav, former Deputy Chief Minister, Government of Bihar

== Incidents ==
=== Hostel student death ===
On 27 August 2008, Pushpanjali Raj, an 11th standard student from Jharkhand, fell from the fifth floor of the girls hostel. She was rushed to the nearby medical center, where she was declared dead. The then principal, Dr Shyama Chona, stated that the student went to the bathroom on the fifth floor and locked it, after which she cut the wire mesh and jumped from the window.

=== Bomb threats and evacuation ===
On 2 February 2024, the school received an email warning of two bombs on the premises at 9 AM. The administration promptly notified the police, evacuated the school, and initiated a search operation. On 10 December 2025, the school received another bomb threat, along with five other schools.

== Controversies ==
=== MMS Scandal ===
In August 2004, an 11th standard student named Hemant Chugh shot an explicit video on his phone of a fellow female student without her consent. The video was shared via MMS on various porn websites. Anupam Thapa, a journalist from the newspaper Today, covered the incident in his article on 9 December 2004, which was used as an FIR by the Hauz Khas police.

As a result of significant media and public outrage, the Delhi High Court ruled that anyone in possession of the clip shall face six months of imprisonment. The incident inspired films such as Dev.D, Love Sex Aur Dhokha and I Don't Luv U, and an episode of the television series Gumrah: End of Innocence.

=== Principal tenure dispute ===
On 20 April 2017, the Central Board of Secondary Education issued a notice to DPS R.K. Puram over extending the services of the then principal, Vanita Sehgal, beyond the academic session. The board alleged that the school management took the decision at its own level and disobeyed the rules for personal benefit.
