= Tej P. Singh =

Indian biophysicist (born 1944)

Tej Pal Singh
- Education: Indian Institute of Science, Bangalore University of Allahabad
- Known for: Protein Structure Determination, Peptide Design; Drug Design
- Children: Vineeta Singh (daughter)
- Awards: Goyal Prize 2010 for Life Sciences; Distinguished Biotechnology Research Professor (DBT) (2009); Distinguished Biotechnologist (DBT) (2006); GN Ramachandran Gold Medal CSIR)
- Scientific career
- Fields: Rational structure based Drug Design
- Workplaces: All India Institute of Medical Sciences

Tej Pal Singh is an Indian biophysicist known for his work in the fields of rational structure-based drug design, structural biology of proteins and X-ray crystallography. He has played an active role in the development of drug design in the fields of antibacterial therapeutics, tuberculosis, inflammation, cancer and gastropathy.

He is first Indian to receive all the six Ramachandran awards of the country. He is a fellow of six academies, namely, the Third World Academy of Sciences, Indian National Science Academy, National Academy of Sciences, Indian Academy of Sciences, Alexander von Humboldt Foundation and Biotech Research Society of India.

== Education ==
Tej obtained his master's degree in science from the University of Allahabad. He started his research career in 1971 as a graduate student at the Indian Institute of Science, Bangalore. He obtained his Ph.D. degree in the mid-1970s working on the crystal structure determinations and design of anti-inflammatory analgesics for new drug discovery. . Before going for his bachelor's degree in Science in Allahabad University, Tej Pal Singh has studied in his neighbourhood village school i.e. Kisan Intermediate College Deorhi-Wajidpur (District-Amroha UP) and later Government Intermediate College (GIC) in Amroha (UP).

== Professional career ==
Soon after obtaining his Ph.D. degree, Tej worked for a year as a lecturer at the University of Indore. He then spent more than two years (1978–1980) as an Alexander von Humboldt / Max-Planck, post doctoral fellow in the German laboratory of Professor Robert Huber, who later received the Nobel Prize. After his return to India he worked as a reader at Sardar Patel University (1980–83) and an additional professor (1984–85) in the Department of Biophysics at the All India Institute of Medical Sciences, New Delhi. He was appointed professor and head of the department in 1986

== Contributions in protein structural biology ==
The three-dimensional structures of various proteins including lactoperoxidase, peptidoglycan recognition protein, lactoferrin from several species, ribosome inactivating proteins, bifunctional inhibitor proteins from plant seeds and various serine proteases and their inhibitors have been determined by his group. The elaborate structural studies of proteins from several important systems as potential drug targets such as phospholipase A2, cyclooxygenase, lipoxygenase, endothelin receptor, endothelin converting enzyme, breast cancer regression proteins and matrix metanosomal proteins as well as their complexes with natural and designed synthetic ligands have been carried out. He had developed the rules of peptide design with alpha, beta – dehydro – amino acids through extensive studies using syntheses, and X-ray and NMR structure determinations. These design rules are being exploited for making specific peptides to act as tight inhibitors of target enzymes and potent antagonists of target receptors for eventually leading to useful therapeutic agents.

He initiated a new programme on Clinical Proteomics at the All India Institute of Medical Sciences in which it is intended to characterize all the proteins that are expressed during various patho/physiological conditions. The newly identified proteins will either be useful as biomarkers or they may be associated with the progression of diseases making them important targets for drug design.

== Awards and honors ==
Tej is a fellow of the Third World Academy of Sciences, Indian National Science Academy, National Academy of Sciences Indian Academy of Sciences, Alexander von Humboldt Foundation and Biotech Research Society of India. He has won the Goyal Prize for Life Sciences, Distinguished Biotechnology Research Professor (DBT) (2009), GN Ramachandran Gold Medal for excellence in Science and Technology (CSIR) (2006), Distinguished Biotechnologist (DBT), 2006, JC Bose Memorial Award (2005), Alexander von Humboldt Fellow (1977), Canadian development Agency Award (1999)
