= Rohit Bansal =

Indian businessman

- Born: Malout, Muktsar Punjab, India
- Education: Indian Institute of Technology Delhi Delhi Public School, R. K. Puram
- Occupation: COO Snapdeal
- Spouse: Parul Bansal
- Children: 2

Rohit Bansal is an Indian entrepreneur, co-founder and COO of e-commerce company Snapdeal.

== Early life ==
Bansal was born in Malout, Punjab India. He completed his school education at Delhi Public School (DPS) New Delhi and got his bachelor's degree in engineering from Indian Institute of Technology New Delhi.

== Snapdeal ==
Bansal co-founded Snapdeal along with his school friend Kunal Bahl on February 4, 2010. In February 2020, Snapdeal invested in a startup Sanfe that deals in female hygiene products. It also invested in Ola, Bira, Razorpay, Beardo.

== Awards and recognitions ==
- BMA Entrepreneur of the Year 2014
- ET Top 50 Entrepreneur of India 2014
- EY Entrepreneur of the year - Startup 2014

== Family ==
His father was a grain merchant and his mother a homemaker. Bansal is married to Parul, who is an architect. He also has two children, Vyas Bansal and Ira Bansal.
