= Harsh Chitale =

Indian businessman

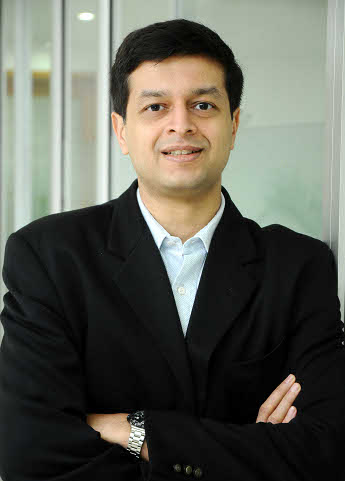
- Harsh Chitale
- Education: IIT Delhi
- Occupations: Ex-CEO & previous Whole Time Director of HCL Infosystems
- Spouse: Mrunalini Chitale
- Parent(s): Madhav Atmaram Chitale and Vijaya Chitale

Harsh Chitale was the previous CEO of HCL Infosystems.

== Early life and education ==
Harsh did his initial schooling at Chikitsak Samuha Shirolkar High School, a Marathi-medium school in Mumbai. Later, he moved to Delhi Public School, R. K. Puram where he completed high-school. Harsh obtained his degree in Electrical Engineering, from IIT Delhi, graduating in 1993. He also received the Director's gold medal at IIT Delhi.

== Career ==
Before HCL, Harsh was the Vice President & GM (Americas Business) of Honeywell Process Solutions (a division of Honeywell International Inc.). Prior to that, he was the Vice President (Global Marketing) of Honeywell Process Solutions, since 1 November 2006.

Harsh started his career, working with the Tata group, in Tata Administration Services (TAS). From December 2004, to November 2006, Harsh worked as Managing Director Honeywell Automation India Ltd.(then, Tata Honeywell Ltd.). He also served as the CEO. Harsh served as Non-executive Vice Chairman and Director, Honeywell Automation India Ltd., till October 2008.
