= Unicommerce =

Indian technology company

Unicommerce eSolutions Limited
- Trade name: Unicommerce
- Type: Public
- Traded as: BSE: 544227; NSE: UNIECOM
- Industry: SaaS
- Founded: February 2012; 14 years ago
- Founder: Karun Singla; Vibhu Garg; Ankit Pruthi
- Headquarters: Haryana, Gurugram, India
- Area served: India, Middle East, Southeast Asia
- Key people: Kapil Makhija (MD & CEO)
- Services: SaaS, Warehouse management, Logistics
- Website: unicommerce.com

Unicommerce (officially Unicommerce eSolutions Limited) is an Indian technology company that provides an e-commerce enablement SaaS platform and is headquartered in Gurugram, India. In fiscal year 2023, Unicommerce's software platform processed 20% to 25% of all e-commerce dropship transaction volumes in India. The company is listed on BSE and NSE in India.

== History ==
Unicommerce was founded in February 2012 by Ankit Pruthi, Karun Singla and Vibhu Garg, who were alumni of IIT Delhi. Singla was a former employee of ecommerce firm Snapdeal. Snapdeal was one of the earliest clients of Unicommerce and the company raised angel funding from its co-founders Kunal Bahl and Rohit Bansal. In 2013, the company received undisclosed funding from Nexus Venture Partners. In 2014, the company raised $10 million from Tiger Global.

Following an acquisition bid by Snapdeal (later rebranded as AceVector Group), the investment from Tiger Global was settled through a share allotment scheme. Snapdeal bought the company in March 2015 at a valuation of more than $40 million. Kapil Makhija was appointed as the CEO following the resignation of the original founders of the company in 2017.

The company filed for IPO in 2024. The IPO launched in August of the same year and was oversubscribed 168 times, leading to its official listing.

== Business ==
Unicommerce provides SaaS based order management and fulfilment platform to ecommerce and retail businesses. In 2024, the company acquired Shipway to expand its logistics tracking and post-purchase automation capabilities.

Unicommerce achieved profitability in fiscal year 2021, driven by increased e-commerce transaction volumes in India. The company has remained continuously profitable since.

== See also ==
- E-commerce in India
- Software as a Service
