= Inshorts =

News aggregator in India

- Type: Private
- Industry: Digital media, News aggregator
- Founded: 2013
- Founders: Azhar Iqubal, Anunay Arunav, Deepit Purkayastha
- Headquarters: Noida, Uttar Pradesh, India
- Area served: India (primarily), Global
- Key people: Deepit Purkayastha (CEO)
- Products: Inshorts (app), Public App
- Revenue: ▲₹181 crore (FY24)
- Net income: ▼₹-228 crore (FY24)
- Website: inshorts.com

Inshorts is a news aggregator and content distribution company based in India. It publishes a mobile app that sends out news stories in 60-word bites. The app curates news from various domains covering news, information, updates, and noteworthy events around the world. Inshorts also operates Public App, a hyperlocal news and video-sharing platform.

Inshorts is one of the most popular news aggregator apps in India with more than 10 million app users.

== History ==
Inshorts was founded in 2013 by Azhar Iqubal (Chairman), Anunay Pandey (Director), and Deepit Purkayastha (CEO). Inshorts has raised a total funding of $119M over six venture capital rounds. Its first funding round was on 5 September 2013. Its latest funding round was a Series D round on 15 July 2021, for $60M. One investor, Vy Capital, participated in its latest round.

In October 2015, Inshorts acquired Betaglide, a Bangalore-based web analytics startup for tracking app retention. In 2020, Inshorts launched Public App, a hyperlocal news, social-network, and video platform focusing on location-based updates.

As of FY24, Inshorts reported operating revenue of ₹181 crore, with a net loss of ₹228 crore, a 26% reduction in losses compared to the previous fiscal year, attributed to cuts in advertising and promotional expenses. Inshorts primarily operates on an advertising-based revenue model.
