= Ritesh Agarwal =

Indian billionaire (born 1993)

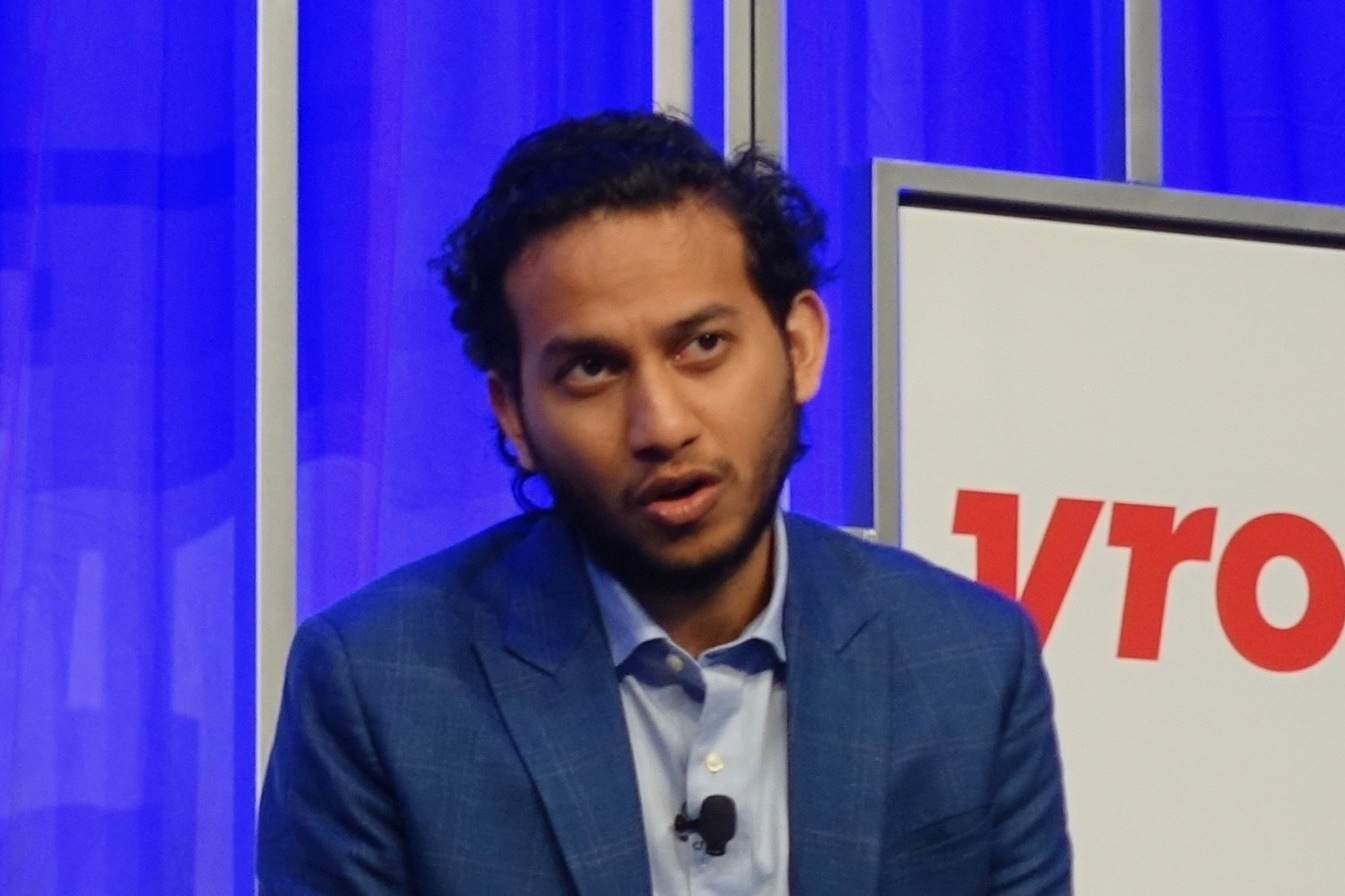
- Agarwal in 2019
- Born: 16 November 1993 (age 32); Bissam Cuttack, Orissa (now Odisha), India
- Occupations: Businessperson; entrepreneur; investor
- Years active: 2012–present
- Organization: PRISM
- Television: Shark Tank India (2024–)
- Spouse: Geetansha Sood (m. 2023)
- Awards: Thiel Fellowship, Business World Young Entrepreneur Award
- Website: prismlife.com

Ritesh Agarwal (born 16 November 1993) is an Indian billionaire entrepreneur and the founder and CEO of PRISM, a hospitality chain. He has been a panellist on Shark Tank India (season 3) in 2024. Agarwal listed among Top 10 youngest Indian billionaires in Hurun Rich List of India 2024, with a net worth of $225 million (₹2,160 crore).

== Personal life ==
Ritesh Agarwal was born in a Marwari family in Bissam Cuttack, Orissa, India and was brought up in Titilagarh. His family operated a small shop in Rayagada, Odisha. He completed his schooling at Sacred Heart School, and later at St. John's Senior Secondary School, before moving to Delhi in 2011 for college.

Agarwal married Geetansha Sood, a native of Lucknow, on 7 March 2023.

== Career ==
In 2011, Agarwal founded an Airbnb equivalent called "Oravel Stays". Agarwal's enterprise was accelerated through the Venture Nursery program in 2012, and was later one of the winners of the 2013 Thiel Fellowship, receiving a US$100,000 grant. The company launched as OYO Rooms in May 2013.

By September 2018, the company had raised US$1 billion. In July 2019, it was reported that Agarwal purchased US$2 billion in shares, tripling his stake in the company.

He appeared on the Forbes 30 Under 30 list for Asia.

In 2023, Agarwal became the youngest "Shark" to appear on Shark Tank India.

In 2024, Agarwal continued to lead OYO Rooms as it built on its success from the previous year. The company focused on expanding its presence in key international markets, particularly in the Nordic countries, Southeast Asia, the United States, and the United Kingdom, where it had seen strong growth. Agarwal also made headlines for his prediction that spiritual tourism would become a significant driver of India’s tourism industry over the next five years. His insights were supported by data showing a 70% surge in bookings for holy destinations like Ayodhya on New Year’s Eve, surpassing popular tourist spots such as Goa and Nainital.

In May 2024, OYO reported its first-ever profit after tax (PAT) of ₹229 crore for the financial year 2023–24, according to the company's annual report. This comes on the back of eight consecutive quarters of positive adjusted EBITDA, the company stated. OYO's adjusted EBITDA grew by 215% to reach ₹877 crore in FY24, up from ₹277 crore in FY23. OYO's parent company, PRISM, secured shareholder approval for a ₹6,650 crore IPO in late December 2025, following strong Q1 FY26 financial results showing increased revenue and profit, with focus now on advancing listing preparations.

== Controversies ==
Agarwal was accused of misappropriating funds owed to a hotel by OYO's co-founder, Manish Sinha, during the early periods of the company. But the company denied all the charges against its founder.

== Television ==
Agarwal is one of the investors/judges on the business reality show Shark Tank India.

== Recognition ==
- In 2016, He was named to the Forbes 30 Under 30 Asia list.
- In 2018, he won EY Entrepreneur of the Year in the services category.
- In 2019, he was named to Bloomberg 50 Most Influential People.
