= Aman Gupta =

Indian entrepreneur and investor (born 1982)

- Born: 4 March 1982 (age 44); Delhi, India
- Citizenship: Indian
- Education: Delhi Public School, R. K. Puram, Delhi University (BCom), Indian School of Business, Hyderabad (MBA), ICAI (CA)
- Occupations: Entrepreneur, businessperson, investor
- Years active: 2003–present
- Organisation: boAt Lifestyle Off/Beat Studio
- Television: Shark Tank India (2021–present)
- Spouse: Priya Dagar (m. 2008)
- Children: 2

Aman Gupta (born 4 March 1982) is an Indian entrepreneur and angel investor. He is the co-founder and was the Chief marketing officer (CMO) of Indian electronics brand boAt Lifestyle. Gupta stepped down from his position as CMO just 29 days before the company filed its IPO Prospectus. He is a judge and investor in the business reality show, Shark Tank India.. He recently ventured into new-age business with OffBeat Studios, which secured ₹100 crore in seed funding, signaling early traction in the space.

== Early life and education ==
Gupta was born in Delhi, India. His father's name is Neeraj Gupta and mother's name is Jyoti Kochar Gupta.

Gupta completed his early education from Delhi Public School, R. K. Puram. He graduated from Shaheed Bhagat Singh College under Delhi University with a BCom (Hons). He is a qualified CA. Later he joined ICAI. He holds an MBA in Finance and Strategy from the Indian School of Business.

== Career ==
Gupta started his career as an assistant manager with Citi. He later joined KPMG as a Senior Management Consultant. Later he co-founded Advanced Telemedia Private Limited and was elevated to the position of chief executive officer (CEO). He founded the electronics brand boAt in 2016 with Sameer Mehta. This company sells headphones, smart watches and speakers.

=== Shark Tank India ===
Gupta is one of the major investors/judges on the business reality show Shark Tank India. He appeared in 5 seasons of Shark Tank India. He has investments in more than 100 companies and startups.

== Entertainment and news ==
In 2022, Gupta along with the other Shark Tank India judges appeared as a VIP contestant in Kaun Banega Crorepati. He also appeared as a guest on The Kapil Sharma Show together with other Shark Tank India judges in 2022 and 2023.

Gupta represented India at the Indo-French CEO Forum with Prime Minister Modi for the second time, highlighting India's rise as the world's third-largest startup ecosystem. He emphasized the success of the "Make in India" initiative, with boAt manufacturing a significant portion of its products locally. Gupta also called for greater collaboration between Indian and French startups, proposing joint participation in India's Startup Mahakumbh and France's VivaTech. He expressed pride in showcasing India's dynamic startup landscape globally.

== Personal life ==
Gupta married Priya Dagar in 2008. The couple has 2 daughters.

== Recognition ==
- In 2019, he won the Businessworld Young Entrepreneur Award.
- In 2019, he was named to the Entrepreneur India Tech 25 Class.
- In 2020, he was the Super 30 CMO's winner.
- In 2020, he won Entrepreneur of the Year.
- In 2020, he was named to Businessworld's list of 40 Under 40 Achievers.
- His brand boAt was titled the World's Top 5 Wearable Brand in 2020 and 2021.
- In 2021, he was named one of the Economic Times 40 Under 40.
- He won the Lokmat Most Stylish Entrepreneur of the Year in 2021.
- In 2022, he won Retailer India Entrepreneur of the Year.
- In 2024, he won the National Creator Award for Celebrity Creator.
