= Kunal Bahl =

Indian entrepreneur

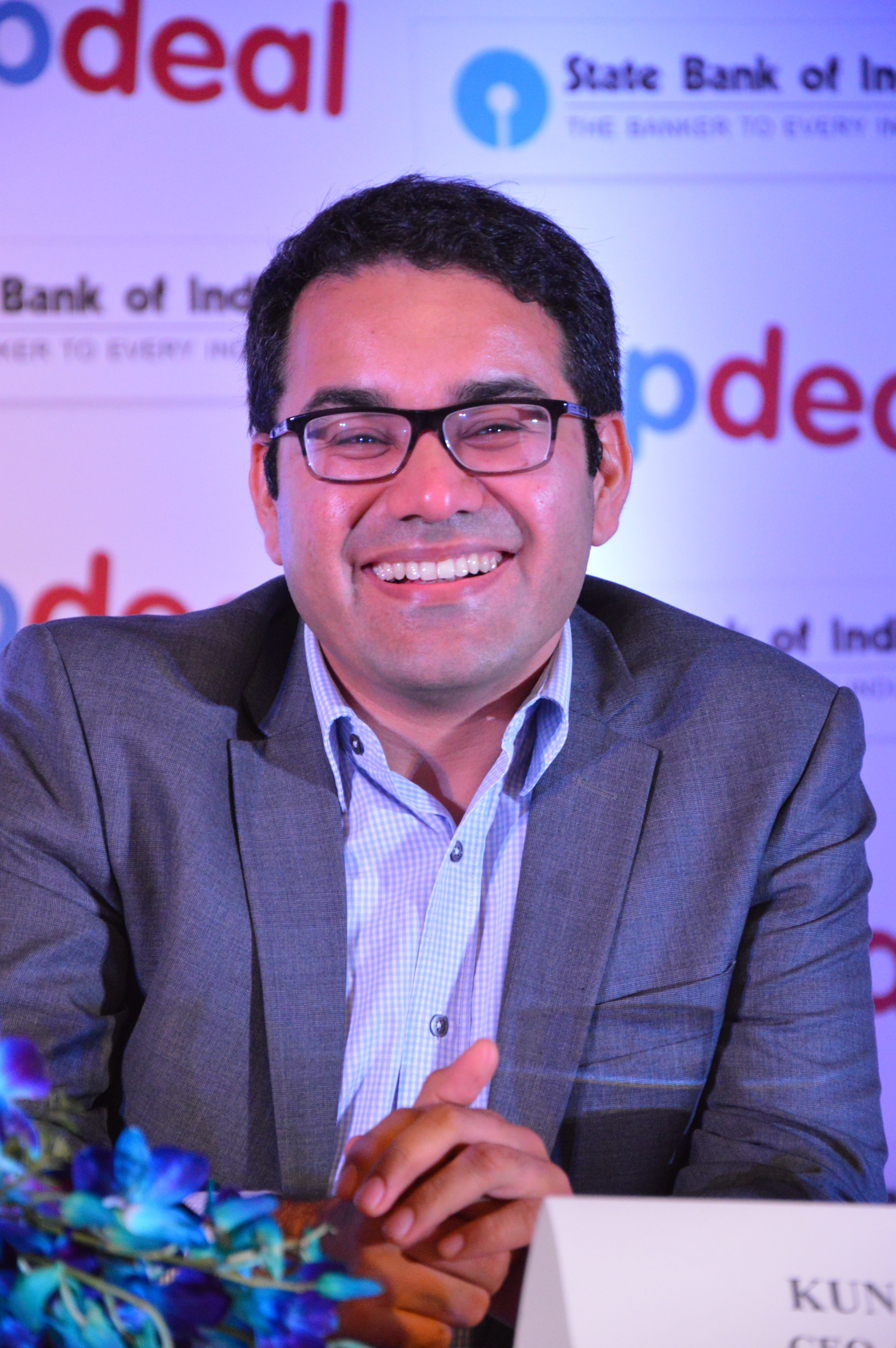
- Bahl in 2015
- Born: New Delhi, India
- Education: B.S.E in Entrepreneurship, Operation & Information Management, Wharton; B.A.S in Engineering
- Alma mater: University of Pennsylvania
- Occupations: Entrepreneur, Investor
- Known for: E-commerce, Venture Capital
- Television: Shark Tank India

Kunal Bahl is an Indian technology entrepreneur and investor.

== Early life ==
Bahl was born in India and had completed his initial school education at Delhi Public School R. K. Puram (DPS) New Delhi. He applied to the University of Pennsylvania and received admission. He graduated from the Jerome Fisher Program in Management and Technology at the University of Pennsylvania, earning two bachelor's degrees in Entrepreneurship, Operation & Information Management from The Wharton School and Engineering from the School of Engineering and Applied Science. He finished an executive marketing program from Kellogg School of Management. He worked with Microsoft for a short period, as he went back to India due to a visa issue in 2007.

== Career ==
Bahl co-founded the e-commerce company Snapdeal in 2010. In 2022, the company assumed the group corporate identity of AceVector, which houses multiple businesses such as Snapdeal, Unicommerce, and Stellaro Brands.

He is the Promoter of Unicommerce, a SaaS company in India, which had its IPO in 2024 becoming on the most highly subscribed IPOs of the year.

He is also the Co-founder of Titan Capital, an early stage venture capital firm in India and has invested in companies like Ola, Urban Company, Mamaearth, Credgenics, Shadowfax, Razorpay, Giva, among others. Famously Titan Capital, which invests the personal funds of Kunal and Rohit Bansal, has made returns of over 100 times in many investments like Ola, Urban Company, Mamaearth, among others.

Bahl has also been involved with various industry associations and think-tanks. He has been on the board of governors of the Indian Council for Research on International Economic Relations, a member of the executive council of NASSCOM, and the chairman of the Confederation of Indian Industry (CII) National Committee on E-commerce. He also serves on the National Startup Advisory Council, a committee to advise the Indian government on efforts needed to build a strong startup ecosystem.

He also serves as an Independent Director on the Board of Piramal Enterprises, an Indian conglomerate. He's also joined The Foundery as a mentor, a new venture by Nikhil Kamath and Kishore Biyani, helping early-stage founders. Bahl champions "Indicorns" (profitable, sustainable Indian companies) over massive, loss-making "unicorns," emphasising long-term value.

== Television ==
Kunal was one of the three main judges and investors in Prime Video's reality TV show "Mission Start Ab" aired on 19 December 2023. He has also appeared as a Shark in Shark Tank India season 4 and 5, both premiering on Sony LIV.

== Awards and recognitions ==
- BMA Entrepreneur of the Year 2014.
- ET Top 50 Entrepreneur of India 2014.
- Ranked 25 on Fortune 40 under 40 most influential business leaders list 2014.
- EY Entrepreneur of the Year - Startup 2014.
- Nasscom NextGen Entrepreneur 2014.
- The Economic Times Entrepreneur of the Year Award 2015.
- AIMA Transformational Business Leader of the Year.
- Indian Affairs Business Leader of the Year 2015.
- The Joseph Wharton Award for Young Leadership 2018.
- The Economic Times Comeback Award 2019.

== Personal life ==
Bahl is married to Yashna, who ran a confectionery business.
