= Vineeta Singh =

Indian entrepreneur

- Born: 1983 (age 42–43); Anand, Gujarat, India
- Education: Delhi Public School, R. K. Puram
- Alma mater: IIT Madras; IIM Ahmedabad
- Occupation: Entrepreneur
- Years active: 2007–present
- Organization: Sugar Cosmetics
- Television: Shark Tank India (2021–present)
- Spouse: Kaushik Mukherjee (m. 2011)
- Children: 2
- Father: Tej P. Singh

Vineeta Singh (born 1983) is an Indian entrepreneur and CEO, co-founder of Sugar Cosmetics. She has been a Shark (i.e. judge/investor) on the business reality TV show Shark Tank India since the show started airing on SonyLIV in 2021.

== Early life and education ==
Singh was born in 1983 in Anand, Gujarat. Her mother holds a PhD and her father Tej P. Singh is a biophysicist at the All India Institutes of Medical Sciences.

Singh completed her education at Delhi Public School, R. K. Puram in 2001. She then enrolled in IIT Madras that year. Singh completed her electrical engineering studies at IIT-M and earned her bachelor's degree in 2005. Afterward, she obtained an MBA from Indian Institute of Management Ahmedabad in 2007.

During her MBA studies, in 2006, she worked as a summer intern at Deutsche Bank and rejected a job despite an annual ₹1-crore salary. Singh and the other graduate who rejected the same offer wanted to start their own lingerie business, but the idea did not take off as they could not raise the required funding.

== Career ==
In 2007, Singh founded her first startup Quetzal. However, providing background verification checks to recruiters failed to succeed. She started her second startup Fab-Bag in 2012, a subscription platform that provided monthly deliveries of beauty products. Her third startup, Sugar Cosmetics, Singh founded together with her husband in 2015. The company sells cosmetics and personal care products geared towards the Indian market. After closing a $50 million deal with private equity firm L Catterton, Singh characterized the company's products as catering to the preferences of women with diverse skin tones. In September 2022, actor Ranveer Singh invested an undisclosed amount and became a "brand evangelist" of Sugar Cosmetics.

Singh appeared on the hard copy cover pages of business magazines, such as Forbes India, Business Today, and Businessworld. To Business Today, she revealed that funding was once only granted under the condition that her husband joined the company full-time, which she viewed as gender discrimination. In 2021, Forbes India listed Singh as one of its Forbes India W-Power list of women achievers. In 2023, Bollywood actress Kareena Kapoor Khan formed a joint venture with Singh and her husband, to launch a Korean skincare brand Quench Botanics in India.

In early 2024, Singh revealed that she is preparing Sugar Cosmetics towards an IPO. For this, she targeted a timeline of approximately two to three years. In alignment with the board, the right timing would require the company to be profitable and stable at a revenue above ₹1000-crore. At the time of the interview, Sugar Cosmetic's outlook was positive. The company had just realized their first profitable month ever and annual revenue had increased by about 20% to just above ₹500-crore. The positive development was discontinued in 2025, when revenue declined to ₹415-crore and the company realized a net loss of about 26% (i.e. ₹108-crore). As a consequence, the company pushed back the IPO target date by another two years.

== Awards and recognition ==
Singh has received the following awards and recognitions, either personally or in recognition of Sugar Cosmetics' entrepreneurial achievements:

- 2 Gold and 2 Silver medals for IIT Madras across 4 Inter IIT Sports Meets attended from 2001–05
- Retail Start-Up of the Year 2019 by Entrepreneur
- Most Promising Brand of The Year 2019 by The Economic Times
- 40 Under Forty 2020 by The Economic Times
- 40 under 40 2021 by Fortune India
- Most Trusted Brand of India 2021 by CNBC TV18
- Most Admired Retailer Award 2021 by IMAGES
- W-Power 2021 by Forbes India
- 40 under 40 2021 by BW Disrupt
- Young Global Leaders 2022 by World Economic Forum
- MPW 2022 by Business Today
- Women Achievers Day Award 2023 by DNA India
- MPW 2023 by Business Today

== Entertainment ==
Singh is one of the major investors/judges on the business reality show Shark Tank India.

In 2022, Singh along with the other Shark Tank India judges appeared as a VIP contestant in Kaun Banega Crorepati, the Hindi version of Who Wants to Be a Millionaire?. She also appeared as a guest on The Kapil Sharma Show together with other Shark Tank India judges in the same year.

== Personal life ==
In 2011, Vineeta Singh married Kaushik Mukherjee and the couple have two sons. She met Kaushik during their studies at IIM Ahmedabad.

Singh is a triathlete and ultramarathon runner and has participated in 20 marathons, ultramarathons, and 12 half-marathons. She also took part in the 89-km Comrades Marathon from 2012 to 2014. She completed the 2017 Ironman Triathlon in Austria. In the 2018 Mumbai Marathon, she ran a total of 21 km in 2:42:51s while being 6 months pregnant.
