= Snapdeal =

Indian e-commerce company

- Company type: Private
- Website type: E-commerce
- Available in: English
- Founded: 4 February 2010; 16 years ago
- Headquarters: New Delhi, India
- Area served: India
- Founders: Kunal Bahl (Chairman & Co-founder); Rohit Bansal (Co-founder)
- Key people: Achint Setia (CEO)
- Industry: E-commerce
- Services: Online shopping
- Revenue: ▼₹388 crore (US$40 million) (FY23)
- Operating income: ▼₹−282 crore (US$−29 million) (FY23)
- Website: www.snapdeal.com
- Commercial: Yes
- Registration: Required
- Current status: Active
- Native clients on: iOS, Android, Windows

Snapdeal is an Indian e-commerce company, based in New Delhi, India. It was founded in February 2010 by Kunal Bahl and Rohit Bansal.

Snapdeal is one of the top 5 online marketplaces in India. Snapdeal targets the value e-commerce segment, which Bahl estimated to be three times larger than the branded goods market.

Fashion, home and general merchandise account for a majority of the products sold by over 500,000 sellers on Snapdeal. Buyers from more than 3,700 towns in India shop on Snapdeal.

== History ==
=== Establishment ===
Snapdeal was founded on 4 February 2010 as a daily deals platform, before expanding to become an online marketplace in October 2011.

=== Unsuccessful merger with Flipkart ===
Reports emerged in Q2 2016 that SoftBank Group planned to engineer a merger between Snapdeal and Flipkart. Discussions took place for months, but concluded in July 2017 after the deal fell through due to lack of consensus among Snapdeal's board members. Disagreements over valuation and proposed special payouts to early investors, Nexus Venture Partners and Kalaari Capital, were among the reasons cited.

=== Snapdeal 2.0 ===
Following the unsuccessful plan to merge with Flipkart, Snapdeal pursued a new strategy it called Snapdeal 2.0. The initiative saw the sale of non-core businesses, Freecharge and Vulcan Express, to dedicate more resources to Snapdeal's e-commerce marketplace, which is its core business.

The strategy yielded strong results. From 2017 to 2021, Snapdeal's revenue grew by 74% at its peak, while losses were cut by nearly 95%. Between the financial years in 2018 and 2020, the number of unique customers on Snapdeal's platform also tripled to 27 million. More than 90% of Snapdeal's orders came from non-metro users.

Under Snapdeal 2.0, the company built an asset-light operating model designed specifically to serve the value e-commerce segment, including decentralised logistics and minimal inventory, keeping operating costs low.

Part of the strategy's success is derived from recreating the bustling and diverse experiences of India's bazaars online. To sell products to non-metro buyers, Snapdeal identified a need to engage and entertain, just like in physical bricks-and-mortar settings. In February 2021, Bahl shared in an interview with KrASIA that "Snapdeal's engagement with this new and a large part of our existing user base is built on three key themes of video, voice, and vernacular. All these initiatives are built around the central idea of how we can help our users discover and transact better, rather than a traditional approach of how we can sell better."

Snapdeal's focus on the value e-commerce segment has led Indian FMCG companies such as Godrej and Himalaya to use its platform to sell their brand products. The companies have made arrangements to sell their products directly on the platform through authorised dealers. Other brands such as The Man Company, Mamaearth, and Ustraa have also partnered with Snapdeal to reach customers from non-metro regions.

In 2021, Snapdeal also announced that it intends to enter the offline retail space in smaller Indian cities.

In July 2022, the company introduced a formalized group structure under the name AceVector Group, consolidating all three ventures: Snapdeal, Unicommerce and Stellaro Brands.

=== Miscellaneous ===
==== Diwali campaign with Aamir Khan ====
In March 2015, Snapdeal engaged actor Aamir Khan to promote its website in India with its Diwali campaign, "Dil Ki Deal. Towards the end, the year-long campaign stirred controversy due to comments made by Khan in his personal capacity.

==== Reported sales of counterfeit products ====
In January 2021, the Office of the United States Trade Representative (USTR) released a 2020 report that identified Snapdeal as a marketplace where counterfeit products are sold. Snapdeal also sent a notice to the USTR asking for the statements made in the report to be retracted, and for a corrigendum to be issued. It was subsequently dropped from the 2021 USTR notorious markets report, released in 2022. Snapdeal is a member of the International Trademark Association (INTA), which has over 7200 members from 187 countries that pledge to protect intellectual property on online marketplaces.

==== Open Network for Digital Commerce ====
In March 2023, Fortune India reported on Snapdeal's integration with the government-led Open Network for Digital Commerce (ONDC), focusing on India's non-metro regions. The company generates over 86% of its business from these areas.

== Funding and acquisitions ==
=== Fundraising ===
Snapdeal has completed multiple rounds of funding.

It received its first investment in January 2011, amounting to US$12 million from Nexus Venture Partners and Indo-US Venture Partners. Another round was done in July 2011 for funds amounting to US$45 million, from Bessemer Venture Partners and existing investors. A third round of funding worth US$50 million was completed the same year, from eBay and existing investors.

In February 2014, Snapdeal raised US$133 million in a round led by eBay together with Kalaari Capital, Nexus Venture Partners, Bessemer Venture Partners, Intel Capital and Saama Capital. The following month, it raised an additional US$105 million from BlackRock, Temasek Holdings, PremjiInvest and others. SoftBank also invested US$647 million in October 2014, making it the largest shareholder in Snapdeal.

In August 2015, Alibaba Group, Foxconn and SoftBank invested US$500 million in Snapdeal. In February of the following year, Ontario Teachers' Pension Plan and Brother Fortune Apparel injected US$200 million in funds into Snapdeal at a valuation of US$6.5 billion.

In May 2017, Snapdeal raised funding worth ₹113 crore from Nexus Venture Partners.

In December 2022, Reuters reported that Snapdeal had cancelled its $152 million IPO due to unfavourable market conditions. The decision followed challenges in the tech stock market, influencing Snapdeal's reassessment and potential deferral of its IPO plans amidst a broader trend of declining valuations in the tech sector.

=== Acquisitions ===
In June 2010, Snapdeal's holding company Jasper Infotech acquired Bengaluru-based group buying website Grabbon.com for an undisclosed amount.

In April 2012, Delhi-based online sports goods retailer eSportsBuy.com was acquired. This was followed by the acquisition of Shopo.in in 2013, which is a customer-to-customer (C2C) e-commerce platform.

In 2014, Snapdeal acquired Doozton, a fashion product discovery technology platform, and Wishpicker, a technology platform that uses machine learning to deliver recommendations for gift purchases. Both deals were completed for undisclosed amounts.

Snapdeal made multiple acquisitions in 2015, acquiring a stake in product comparison website Smartprix in January, before acquiring a discovery site for luxury fashion products, Exclusively.in. Two months later, it acquired a 20% stake in logistics service company GoJavas as well as e-commerce solution provider Unicommerce, and financial transaction platform RupeePower. In April 2015, mobile payments company Freecharge was acquired by Snapdeal. Programmatic display advertising platform Reduce Data was also acquired in September of the same year.

In August 2016, logistics firm Pigeon Express acquired a 51% stake in GoJavas with Snapdeal holding 49% stake in the firm. In March 2017, Snapdeal sold its stake in GoJavas to Pigeon Express.

== Collaborations ==
- In Sep 2014, Croma entered into strategic partnership with Snapdeal to sell electronic goods online.
- In Mar 2016, JLL India's residential services collaborated with Snapdeal to provide brokerage-free buyer services in primary property sales.
- In Jan 2018, Pantaloons partners Snapdeal to enhance online portfolio.
- In Feb 2022, Snapdeal partners with GoKwik to enhance shopping experience.
- In Sep 2023, Snapdeal partnered with Agoda to give consumers travel choices.

== See also ==
- E-commerce in India
- Online shopping
- Retail
