= Shark Tank India season 2 =

Second season of business reality show Shark Tank India

Shark Tank India
- Season 2
- Starring: Anupam Mittal; Peyush Bansal; Vineeta Singh; Aman Gupta; Amit Jain; Namita Thapar; Rahul Dua (host)
- No. of episodes: 51

Release
- Original network: Sony LIV
- Original release: 2 January – 13 March 2023

Season chronology
- ← Previous; Season 1 Next → Season 3

The second season of Shark Tank India aired from 2 January 2023 to 13 March 2023.

== Sharks ==
Any five of the following six sharks (or all six sharks in episodes 48–50) are present in each episode.

Shark	Company
Amit Jain	CEO and co-founder of CarDekho
Aman Gupta	Co-founder and Chief Marketing Officer of boAt Lifestyle
Namita Thapar	Executive Director of Emcure Pharmaceuticals
Peyush Bansal	Co-founder and CEO of Lenskart
Anupam Mittal	Founder and CEO of Shaadi.com and People Group
Vineeta Singh	CEO and co-founder of SUGAR Cosmetics

== Pitches and investments by sharks ==
Ep. no.		Pitch no.l	Brand	Idea	Original ask	Deal	Investment by					
Ep. no.		Pitch no.l	Brand	Idea	Original ask	Deal	Namita Thapar	Anupam Mittal	Vineeta Singh	Aman Gupta	Peyush Bansal	Amit Jain
1		1	HooVu Fresh	Flowers	₹ 80 Lakhs for 1% equity	₹1 crore or 2% equity				Green checkmark	Green checkmark	—N/a
1		2	Dorje Teas	Darjeeling tea	₹ 30 Lakhs for 5% equity	₹ 30 Lakhs for 15% equity		Green checkmark	Green checkmark		Green checkmark	—N/a
1		3	Recode Studio	Beauty products	₹ 1 Crore for 1% equity	No Deal						—N/a
2		4	Very Much Indian	Traditional and ethnic sarees	₹ 50 Lakhs for 3% equity	₹ 50 Lakhs for 10% equity	Green checkmark			Green checkmark		—N/a
2		5	Watchout Wearables	Smartwatches for kids and senior citizens	₹ 2 Crores for 5% equity	₹ 1 Crore for 10% equity and ₹ 1 Crore debt @15% interest		Green checkmark	Green checkmark			—N/a
2		6	SoupX	Healthy soups and soup-based meals	₹ 75 Lakhs for 6% equity	₹ 50 Lakhs for 18% equity and ₹ 25 Lakhs debt @12% interest			Green checkmark			—N/a
3		7	Atmosphere	Kombucha	₹ 75 Lakhs for 3% equity	No Deal						—N/a
3		8	Stage	Vernacular OTT platform	₹ 3 Crores for 1% equity	₹ 1.5 Crores for 0.6% equity and ₹ 1.5 Crores debt @12% interest	Green checkmark			Green checkmark	Green checkmark	—N/a
3		9	Girgit	Colour changing apparels	₹ 20 Lakhs for 10% equity	₹ 20 Lakhs for 20% equity	Green checkmark					—N/a
4		10	Gear Head Motors	Affordable electric bicycles and tricycles	₹ 75 Lakhs for 2% equity	₹ 1 Crore for 6.67% equity				Green checkmark	Green checkmark	—N/a
4		11	Patil Kaki	Home-style hygienic snacks	₹ 40 Lakhs for 2.5% equity	₹ 40 Lakhs for 4% equity		Green checkmark			Green checkmark	—N/a
4		12	Brandsdaddy	Automatic fire extinguisher	₹ 70 Lakhs for 5% equity	₹ 35 Lakhs for 5% equity and ₹ 35 Lakhs debt @12% interest	Green checkmark					—N/a
5		13	Winston	Salon at home appliances	₹ 1 Crore for 4% equity	₹ 1 Crore for 10% equity		Green checkmark	Green checkmark			—N/a
5		14	Flatheads	Sneakers	₹ 75 Lakhs for 3% equity	No Deal						—N/a
5		15	Organic Smokes	Herbal smokes	₹ 1 Crore for 1% equity	No Deal						—N/a
6		16	Teafit	Iced tea drinks	₹ 50 Lakhs for 3% equity	₹ 50 Lakhs for 8% equity		Green checkmark	Green checkmark	Green checkmark	Green checkmark	—N/a
6		17	Haqdarshak	Availing government schemes	₹ 1 Crore for 0.5% equity	₹ 1 Crore for 2% equity	Green checkmark			Green checkmark	Green checkmark	—N/a
6		18	Bhaskar's Puranpoli Ghar	Varieties of puranpoli	₹ 75 Lakhs for 1% equity	No Deal						—N/a
7		19	GunjanApps Studios	Android app development	₹ 2.5 Crore for 1% equity	No Deal						—N/a
7		20	The Simply Salad	Healthy salads	₹ 30 Lakhs for 10% equity	₹ 30 Lakhs for 10% equity			Green checkmark	Green checkmark		—N/a
7		21	AyuSynk	Medical devices	₹ 1 Crore for 1.5% equity	₹ 50 Lakhs for 3.5% equity and ₹ 50 Lakhs debt @10% interest	Green checkmark					—N/a
8		22	Atypical Advantage	Employment for the specially-abled	₹ 30 Lakhs for 1% equity	₹ 30 Lakhs for 3% equity	Green checkmark			Green checkmark		—N/a
8		23	House of Chikankari	Ethnicwear	₹ 75 Lakhs for 1% equity	₹ 75 Lakhs for 3.75% equity				Green checkmark	Green checkmark	—N/a
8		24	Magic Of Memories	Keepsake jewellery	₹ 25 Lakhs for 5% equity	No Deal						—N/a
9		25	Paradyes	Semi-permanent hair dyes	₹ 65 Lakhs for 1% equity	₹ 65 Lakhs for 2% equity			Green checkmark	Green checkmark		—N/a
9		26	Nestroots	Home decorations	₹ 50 Lakhs for 1% equity	₹ 50 Lakhs for 2% equity	Green checkmark					—N/a
9		27	Coezy Sleep	Sleeping bag	₹ 30 Lakhs for 20% equity	No Deal						—N/a
10		28	Zillionaire	New age lifestyle jewellery	₹ 50 Lakhs for 3.3% equity	₹ 1 Crore for 10% equity		Green checkmark				—N/a
10		29	Credmate	Money management	₹ 50 Lakhs for 5% equity	No Deal						—N/a
10		30	Freebowler	Automatic bowling machine	₹ 75 Lakhs for 7.5% equity	₹ 25 Lakhs for 7.5% equity and ₹ 50 Lakhs debt @10% interest	Green checkmark					—N/a
11		31	ABC Fitness Academy	Sports & fitness	₹ 40 Lakhs for 4% equity	₹ 40 Lakhs for 10% equity					Green checkmark	—N/a
11		32	Primebook	Android laptops	₹ 75 Lakhs for 1.5% equity	₹ 75 Lakhs for 3% equity				Green checkmark	Green checkmark	—N/a
11		33	Daily Dump	Waste management	₹ 80 Lakhs for 4% equity	₹ 30 Lakhs for 4% equity and ₹ 50 Lakhs debt @10% interest	Green checkmark					—N/a
12		34	Ghar Soaps	Ayurveda	₹ 60 Lakhs for 2% equity	₹ 60 Lakhs for 4% equity			—N/a	Green checkmark		
12		35	Janitri	Pregnancy monitoring device	₹ 1 Crore for 2.5% equity	₹ 1 Crore for 2.5% equity (Condition - If revenue of ₹ 20 Crore is not achieved in the next financial year, the sharks will get an additional 2.5% equity)	Green checkmark		—N/a			
12		36	Jaipur Watch Company	Micro-luxury watch	₹ 50 Lakhs for 2% equity	No Deal			—N/a			
13		37	Inside FPV	FPV drones	₹ 75 Lakhs for 4% equity	₹ 75 Lakhs for 15% equity	Green checkmark		—N/a	Green checkmark	Green checkmark	Green checkmark
13		38	Angrakhaa	Size inclusive clothing	₹ 40 Lakhs for 5% equity	₹ 40 Lakhs for 20% equity			—N/a			Green checkmark
13		39	Diabexy	Diabetic food products	₹ 1.5 crores for 1% equity	No Deal			—N/a			
14		40	Kyari Innovation	Adventure safety gadgets	₹ 51 Lakhs for 1% equity	₹ 51 Lakhs for 6% equity		Green checkmark	—N/a		Green checkmark	
14		41	MOPP Foods	Food	₹ 75 Lakhs for 2.25% equity	₹ 75 Lakhs for 5% equity			—N/a			Green checkmark
14		42	Econiture	Plastic recycled furniture	₹ 50 Lakhs for 8% equity	No Deal			—N/a			
15		43	Dobiee	Candy manufacturer	₹ 72 Lakhs for 2% equity	₹ 72 Lakhs for 6.5% equity			—N/a			Green checkmark
15		44	FastBeetle	Delivery service in kashmir	₹ 90 Lakhs for 3% equity	₹ 90 Lakhs for 7.5% equity			—N/a	Green checkmark	Green checkmark	
15		45	P-Flow	Medical device	₹ 60 Lakhs for 1% equity	₹ 60 Lakhs for 6% equity	Green checkmark		—N/a			Green checkmark
16		46	VS Mani & Co	Filter coffee	₹ 60 Lakhs for 1.5% equity	₹ 19 Lakhs for 1% equity and ₹ 41 Lakhs debt @10% interest	Green checkmark	Anupam Mittal had already invested in the company before it pitched on Shark Tank.	—N/a			
16		47	Sepal	Motorcycle canopy	₹ 50 Lakhs for 1% equity	₹ 50 Lakhs for 2% equity			—N/a		Green checkmark	
16		48	Solinas	Water sanitation asset management	₹ 90 Lakhs for 2% equity	₹ 90 Lakhs for 3% equity		Green checkmark	—N/a		Green checkmark	
17		49	Avimee Herbal	Hair and skincare products	₹ 2.8 Crores for 0.5% equity	No Deal			—N/a			
17		50	Eyenic	Eyewear	₹ 75 Lakhs for 6% equity	No Deal			—N/a			
17		51	Ekatra	Sustainable artisinal brand for stationaries and lifestyle products	₹ 40 Lakhs for 10% equity	₹ 20 Lakhs for 20% equity and ₹ 20 Lakhs debt @10% interest			—N/a		Green checkmark	Green checkmark
18		52	Raasa	Hygienic and safe foodcarts	₹ 50 Lakhs for 5% equity	₹ 50 Lakhs for 25% equity		Green checkmark	—N/a			
18		53	Neomotion	Motorised wheelchair	₹ 1 Crores for 1% equity	₹ 1 Crores for 1% equity (Condition - Peyush Bansal will receive 5% of profits till he receives ₹ 1 Crore which will be donated)			—N/a		Green checkmark	
18		54	Licksters	Popsicles	₹ 50 Lakhs for 5% equity	₹ 25 Lakhs for 5% equity and ₹ 25 Lakhs debt			—N/a			Green checkmark
18		55	Sayonara	Petticoat	₹ 1 Crore for 10% equity	No Deal			—N/a			
19		56	PMV	2-seater fully electric smart micro-car	₹ 1 Crore for 1% equity	No Deal						—N/a
19		57	Spice Story	Desi sauces	₹ 70 Lakhs for 2% equity	₹ 70 Lakhs for 5% equity	Green checkmark					—N/a
19		58	Bullspree	Stock market education	₹ 75 Lakhs for 1.5% equity	₹ 75 Lakhs for 2.86% equity				Green checkmark	Green checkmark	—N/a
20		59	Snitch	Men's fashion	₹ 1.5 crores for 0.5% equity	₹ 1.5 crores for 1.5% equity	Green checkmark	Green checkmark	Green checkmark	Green checkmark	Green checkmark	—N/a
20		60	Portl	Interactive fitness mirror	₹ 1.5 crores for 0.5% equity	₹ 1.5 crores for 2.5% equity	Green checkmark			Green checkmark	Green checkmark	—N/a
20		61	Fat to Slim	Diet program	₹ 20 Lakhs for 1% equity	No Deal						—N/a
21		62	Cheesecake and Co.	Cheese cakes	₹ 1 Crore for 2% equity	No Deal						—N/a
21		63	Dabble	Children's crayons	₹ 50 Lakhs for 10% equity	₹ 15 Lakhs for 10% equity and ₹ 35 Lakhs debt at 0% interest				Green checkmark		—N/a
21		64	Cloud Tailor	Fashion and tailoring	₹ 1 Crore for 1.4% equity	No Deal						—N/a
21		65	BeUnic	Gender-inclusive lifestyle	₹ 1 Crore for 10% equity	No Deal						—N/a
22		66	Broomees	Professional home services	₹ 80 Lakhs for 2% equity	₹ 1 Crore for 3% equity	Green checkmark			Green checkmark	Green checkmark	—N/a
22		67	Ravel	Hair products	₹ 75 Lakhs for 2.5% equity	₹ 75 Lakhs for 10% equity (Condition - Ravel needs to achieve ₹ 7.5 Lakhs monthly profit in 2 months)		Green checkmark				—N/a
22		68	HoneyVeda	Honey products	₹ 75 Lakhs for 7.5% equity	₹ 50 Lakhs for 20% equity and ₹ 25 Lakhs debt at 12% interest		Green checkmark	Green checkmark			—N/a
23		69	PadCare	Menstrual products recycling	₹ 50 Lakhs for 2% equity	₹ 1 Crore for 4% equity	Green checkmark	Green checkmark	Green checkmark		Green checkmark	—N/a
23		70	Swadeshi Blessings	Artisinal cookware	₹ 50 Lakhs for 5% equity	₹ 25 Lakhs for 5% equity and ₹ 25 Lakhs debt @ 12% interest	Green checkmark		Green checkmark			—N/a
23		71	OLL	Online live learning platform	₹ 30 Lakhs for 2% equity	₹ 30 Lakhs for 5% equity			Green checkmark		Green checkmark	—N/a
23		72	Febris	Medical lifestyle	₹ 1 Crore for 2.5% equity	No Deal						—N/a
24		73	GeeAni	Cheapest and smallest electric tractor	₹ 75 Lakhs for 7.5% equity	₹ 1 Crore for 10% equity		Green checkmark	Green checkmark	Green checkmark	—N/a	
24		74	Amore	Gelato and sorbetto	₹ 75 Lakhs for 4% equity	₹ 75 Lakhs for 7.5% equity (Condition - Amore needs to achieve sales of ₹ 80 Lakhs per month by March 2023)		Green checkmark			—N/a	
24		75	LeafyAffairs	Botanical lifestyle brand	₹ 50 Lakhs for 2.5% equity	No Deal					—N/a	
25		76	ScrapUncle	Scrap recycling	₹ 60 Lakhs for 3% equity	₹ 60 Lakhs for 5% equity					—N/a	Green checkmark
25		77	Sharmaji Ka Aata	Flour making	₹ 40 Lakhs for 10% equity	₹ 40 Lakhs for 20% equity		Green checkmark			—N/a	
25		78	ManeTain	Haircare products	₹ 75 Lakhs for 2.5% equity	₹ 75 Lakhs for 10% equity				Green checkmark	—N/a	
26		79	Gavin Paris	Street fashion	₹ 50 Lakhs for 5% equity	No Deal					—N/a	
26		80	Unstop	Career building	₹ 1 Crores for 1% equity	₹ 2 Crores for 4% equity	Green checkmark	Green checkmark		Green checkmark	—N/a	Green checkmark
26		81	Blue Tea	Tea	₹ 75 Lakhs for 1% equity	₹ 50 Lakhs for 3% equity and ₹ 25 Lakhs debt @ 12% interest				Green checkmark	—N/a	
27		82	Green Snack	Healthy snacks	₹ 1 Crores for 2% equity	₹ 1 Crores for 8% equity			Green checkmark		—N/a	
27		83	Hobby India	Hobby idea DIY items	₹ 50 Lakhs for 3% equity	No Deal					—N/a	
27		84	Flhexible	Paper furniture	₹ 50 Lakhs for 7.5% equity	No Deal					—N/a	
27		85	Upthrust Esports	Online gaming events broadcast	₹ 75 Lakhs for 3% equity	No Deal					—N/a	
28		86	Zoff	Spices brand	₹ 1 Crores for 0.5% equity	₹ 1 Crores for 1.25% equity				Green checkmark	—N/a	
28		87	Desi Toys	Ancient toys	₹ 50 Lakhs for 3% equity	No Deal					—N/a	
28		88	Cloudworx	Metaverse	₹ 40 Lakhs for 2% equity	₹ 40 Lakhs for 3.2% equity	Green checkmark	Green checkmark			—N/a	
29		89	Mahantam	Tea glasses washing machine	₹ 30 Lakhs for 10% equity	₹ 30 Lakhs for 20% equity	Green checkmark	Green checkmark	Green checkmark	Green checkmark	Green checkmark	—N/a
29		90	Mindpeers	Mental health app	₹ 53 Lakhs for 1% equity	₹ 1.06 Crores for 2% equity (₹ 53 Lakhs from Peyush for 1% equity and ₹ 53 Lakhs from Aman, Namita and Vineeta for 1% equity)	Green checkmark		Green checkmark	Green checkmark	Green checkmark	—N/a
29		91	Barosi	Organic milk products	₹ 50 Lakhs for 2% equity	No Deal						—N/a
30		92	Daryaganj	Restaurants chain	₹ 90 Lakhs for 0.5% equity	₹ 90 Lakhs for 1% equity (Condition - Aman to be included in secondary offload)				Green checkmark		—N/a
30		93	Dhruv Vidyut	Electric conversion kit	100 Hours for 0.5% equity	100 Hours for 0.5% equity (Condition - 1. Dhruv Vidyut has to raise ₹ 1 Crore. 2. Aman & Peyush will be the first investors of Dhruv Vidyut)		Green checkmark		Green checkmark	Green checkmark	—N/a
30		94	CellBell	Executive and gaming chairs	₹ 90 Lakhs for 1.5% equity	No Deal						—N/a
31		95	Tipayi	Kids wooden balance bike without pedals and brakes	₹ 50 Lakhs for 10% equity	No Deal						—N/a
31		96	DigiQure	E-clinic	₹ 40 Lakhs for 4% equity	₹ 40 Lakhs for 10% equity	Green checkmark					—N/a
31		97	Nirmalya	Incense products from dried flowers	₹ 60 Lakhs for 1.5% equity	No Deal						—N/a
32		98	Pabiben	Handicraft items	₹ 50 Lakhs for 5% equity	₹ 10 Lakhs for 5% equity and ₹ 40 Lakhs debt @ 0% interest	Green checkmark					—N/a
32		99	Homestrap	Home organizers	₹ 70 Lakhs for 1% equity	₹ 50 Lakhs for 7% equity and ₹ 20 Lakhs debt @ 10% interest		Green checkmark				—N/a
32		100	Ubreathe	Air purifiers	₹ 1.5 Crores for 7.5% equity	₹ 50 Lakhs for 5% equity and ₹ 1 Crore debt @ 10% interest	Green checkmark					—N/a
32		101	Deyor	Holidays planner	₹ 1 Crores for 1% equity	No Deal						—N/a
33		102	iMumz	24x7 guidance and tracking app for pregnant mothers	₹ 70 Lakhs for 1% equity	₹ 10 Lakhs for 1% equity and ₹ 60 Lakhs debt @ 10% interest					Green checkmark	—N/a
33		103	The Healthy Binge	Healthy snacks	₹ 50 Lakhs for 5% equity	₹ 50 Lakhs for 5% equity				Green checkmark	Green checkmark	—N/a
33		104	Freakins	Fashion apparel brand	₹ 70 Lakhs for 1% equity	₹ 50 Lakhs for 2.5% equity and ₹ 20 Lakhs debt @ 12% interest (Condition - This investment will be a part of a bigger investment round)			Green checkmark			—N/a
34		105	Perfora	Oral care products	₹ 80 Lakhs for 1% equity	₹ 80 Lakhs for 2.5% equity	Green checkmark		Green checkmark		Green checkmark	—N/a
34		106	Midnight Angels	Plus size night wear	₹ 75 Lakhs for 6% equity	No Deal						—N/a
34		107	CureSee	AI-based vision therapy website	₹ 40 Lakhs for 5% equity	₹ 50 Lakhs for 10% equity					Green checkmark	—N/a
35		108	Medulance	Ambulance services	₹ 2 Crores for 1% equity	₹ 2 Crores for 2% equity	Green checkmark		—N/a	Green checkmark	Green checkmark	
35		109	Cakelicious	Flavourful cakes	₹ 25 Lakhs for 5% equity	₹ 25 Lakhs for 20% equity			—N/a			Green checkmark
35		110	Bowled.io	Sports-based gaming platform	₹ 80 Lakhs for 1% equity	No Deal			—N/a			
35		111	Toyshine	Toddlers specialist indoor toy	₹ 1.25 Crores for 0.5% equity	No Deal			—N/a			
36		112	Neuphony	A brain smartwatch	₹ 1 Crore for 2% equity	₹ 1 Crore for 5.4% equity				Green checkmark	Green checkmark	—N/a
36		113	Amrutam	Ayurvedic lifestyle brand	₹ 50 Lakhs for 2% equity	No Deal						—N/a
36		114	HoloKitab	Augmented reality	₹ 45 Lakhs for 10% equity	₹ 45 Lakhs for 25% equity	Green checkmark					—N/a
37		115	Zoe Nutrition	A holistic health and wellness brand	₹ 75 Lakhs for 5% equity	No Deal			—N/a			
37		116	Hornback	Foldable cycle	₹ 50 Lakhs for 1% equity	₹ 50 Lakhs for 2.5% equity			—N/a			Green checkmark
37		117	Malaki	Beverage brand	₹ 50 Lakhs for 1% equity	₹ 50 Lakhs for 3% equity			—N/a	Green checkmark	Green checkmark	
37		118	Nano Clean	Filtration technology	₹ 80 Lakhs for 2% equity	No Deal			—N/a			
38		119	DesmondJi	Indian alcoholic brand	₹ 1 Crore for 1% equity	No Deal			—N/a			
38		120	Cremeitalia	A cheese brand	₹ 90 Lakhs for 1.5% equity	No Deal			—N/a			
38		121	Nawgati	An online ecosystem for fuel	₹ 67 Lakhs for 2% equity	₹ 67 Lakhs for 3% equity			—N/a	Green checkmark		Green checkmark
38		122	Swytchd	Subscription based electric vehicle rental	₹ 50 Lakhs for 3% equity	No Deal			—N/a			
39		123	Gladful	Family-friendly protein	₹ 50 Lakhs for 2% equity	₹ 50 Lakhs for 3.5% equity	Green checkmark		—N/a	Green checkmark		Green checkmark
39		124	Pharmallama	A smart medicine box	₹ 1 Crore for 1.5% equity	₹ 2 crores for 5% equity	Green checkmark	Green checkmark	—N/a	Green checkmark	Green checkmark	Green checkmark
39		125	Crave Raja Foods	Kolkata-based cloud kitchen	₹ 65 Lakhs for 3% equity	No Deal			—N/a			
39		126	Va Perfumes	Night incense stick	₹ 1 Crore for 10% equity	No Deal			—N/a			
40		127	Hood	A pseudonymous social network	₹ 1.2 Crore for 0.2% equity	₹ 60 Lakhs for 0.54% equity and ₹ 60 Lakhs debt @ 12% interest			—N/a	Green checkmark	Green checkmark	
40		128	Twisting Scoops	Asia's largest Turkish ice cream chain	₹ 1 Crore for 2.5% equity	No Deal			—N/a			
40		129	GrowIt	Protective farming products	₹ 1 Crore for 1% equity	₹ 50 Lakhs for 1% equity and ₹ 50 Lakhs debt @ 10% interest	Green checkmark		—N/a		Green checkmark	
41		130	Makino	Nachos and nuts	₹ 2 Crore for 2% equity	No Deal						—N/a
41		131	Trunome	Diagnosis and monitoring platform for chronic diseases	₹ 1.5 crores for 1% equity	₹ 1.5 crores for 2% equity		Green checkmark	Green checkmark	Green checkmark	Green checkmark	—N/a
41		132	WOL3D	A consumer 3D printing brand	₹ 1.5 crores for 1% equity	₹ 80 Lakhs for 2% equity and ₹ 70 Lakhs debt @ 12% interest				Green checkmark		—N/a
41		133	What's Up Wellness	A healthy gummy	₹ 50 Lakhs for 3% equity	₹ 60 Lakhs for 4.76% equity		Green checkmark	Green checkmark	Green checkmark		—N/a
42		134	Proost	A premium strong beer	₹ 1 Crore for 0.75% equity	No Deal			—N/a			
42		135	Dr Cubes	A hygienic ice cube brand	₹ 80 Lakhs for 15% equity	No Deal			—N/a			
42		136	Metro Ride	AI-based EV vehicle booking platform	₹ 75 Lakhs for 1% equity	No Deal			—N/a			
42		137	Conker App	A skill-based startup	₹ 40 Lakhs for 2% equity	No Deal			—N/a			
43		138	WTF	A budget smart restaurant chain	₹ 75 Lakhs for 5% equity	No Deal			—N/a			
43		139	Funngro	A platform that helps teenagers earn	₹ 50 Lakhs for 1.25% equity	₹ 50 Lakhs for 4.16% equity	Green checkmark		—N/a			Green checkmark
43		140	Aadvik Foods	Goat and Camel milk products	₹ 60 Lakhs for 1.5% equity	₹ 15 Lakhs for 1.5% equity and ₹ 45 Lakhs debt @ 12% interest			—N/a			Green checkmark
43		141	Oye Happy	Bedroom gifts	₹ 50 Lakhs for 1% equity	No Deal			—N/a			
44		142	Healthy Master	Healthy munching brand	₹ 50 Lakhs for 3% equity	₹ 50 Lakhs for 6.5% equity			Green checkmark			—N/a
44		143	Kitsons	A one-stop shop for toys, gifts, stationery, art and craft and books	₹ 10 Crores for 10% equity	No Deal						—N/a
44		144	London Bubble Co.	Desserts	₹ 75 Lakhs for 5% equity	₹ 75 Lakhs for 15% equity	Green checkmark					—N/a
44		145	Waggy Zone	Vegan pet ice creams	₹ 50 Lakhs for 5% equity	No Deal						—N/a
45		146	NutriCook	Oilless and waterless cookware	₹ 1 Crore for 2% equity	₹ 50 Lakhs for 10% equity and ₹ 50 Lakhs debt @ 12% interest			Green checkmark			—N/a
45		147	Subhag	A home IUI kit	₹ 50 Lakhs for 1% equity	₹ 20 Lakhs for 1% equity and ₹ 30 Lakhs debt @ 10% interest	Green checkmark					—N/a
45		148	Singh Styled	Quality turbans and personal care products for Sikhs	₹ 50 Lakhs for 5% equity	₹ 50 Lakhs for 10% equity (Condition - Peyush has the option to invest an additional ₹ 75 Lakhs at the same valuation)					Green checkmark	—N/a
F I N A L E W E E K	46	149	Zsportstech	Customised cricket bat	₹ 60 Lakhs for 2% equity	No Deal						—N/a
F I N A L E W E E K	46	150	The Plated Project	Unique plates made by artists	₹ 75 Lakhs for 2% equity	₹ 75 Lakhs for 3.75% equity	Green checkmark		Green checkmark	Green checkmark		—N/a
F I N A L E W E E K	46	151	VsnapU	A one-stop solution for all photographic needs	₹ 50 Lakhs for 1.5% equity	No Deal						—N/a
F I N A L E W E E K	46	152	The Health Factory	Healthy protein bread	₹ 75 Lakhs for 2.1% equity	No Deal						—N/a
F I N A L E W E E K	47	153	Brevistay	Hourly hotel bookings	₹ 1 Crore for 1.66% equity	No Deal					—N/a	
F I N A L E W E E K	47	154	SoulUp	A peer-to-peer network	₹ 50 Lakhs for 3% equity	₹ 50 Lakhs for 5% equity	'				—N/a	
F I N A L E W E E K	47	155	The Big Book Box and ChapterOne Books	A solution for book readers	₹ 80 Lakhs for 8% equity	No Deal					—N/a	
F I N A L E W E E K	48	156	Rubans	Trend-setting fashion jewellery	₹ 1.5 Crores for 0.5%	₹ 1 Crore for 1% equity and ₹ 50 Lakhs debt @12% interest	Green checkmark		Green checkmark	Green checkmark		
F I N A L E W E E K	48	157	Same Notification	A notification tracking app	₹ 25 Lakhs for 15% equity	No Deal						
F I N A L E W E E K	48	158	Bottom Line Sprays	Portable jet sprays	₹ 35 Lakhs for 5% equity	No Deal						
F I N A L E W E E K	48	159	Lil'Goodness	Unique Prebiotic Chocolates with haldi, Prebiotic Milkshake and Teff Grain based products such as Puffs	₹ 1 Crore for 1% equity	₹ 50 Lakhs for 1% equity and ₹ 50 Lakhs debt @10% interest					Green checkmark	
F I N A L E W E E K	49	160	Forever Modest	Modest clothes	₹ 20 Lakhs for 10% equity	₹ 20 Lakhs for 20% equity	Green checkmark	Green checkmark	Green checkmark			Green checkmark
F I N A L E W E E K	49	161	Sahayatha	A solution for mobility impaired	₹ 1 Crore for 10% equity	₹ 1 Crore for 10% equity	Green checkmark	Green checkmark		Green checkmark	Green checkmark	Green checkmark
F I N A L E W E E K	49	162	Wicked Gud	Healthy Pasta and Noodles	₹ 50 Lakhs for 1% equity	No Deal				Aman Gupta had already invested in the company before it pitched on Shark Tank.		
F I N A L E W E E K	49	163	Maisha	Trendsetting Bags	₹ 75 Lakhs for 3% equity	₹ 10 Lakhs for 1% equity and ₹ 65 Lakhs debt @18% interest						Green checkmark
F I N A L E W E E K	50	164	Nish Hair	Hair extensions for women	₹ 1 Crore for 2% equity	₹ 1 Crore for 2% equity						Green checkmark
F I N A L E W E E K	50	165	MyByk	Public bicycle sharing service	₹ 2 Crore for 1% equity	No Deal						
F I N A L E W E E K	50	166	SUGAR Cosmetics	Makeup brand	In popular culture							
	Investment (in Cr. ₹)						₹ 13.889 Cr.	₹ 9.148 Cr.	₹ 7.820 Cr.	₹ 15.726 Cr.	₹ 13.907 Cr.	₹ 6.809 Cr.
	Number of deals made						41	25	25	41	39	19

== Specials ==
This season introduced various special segments like Beyond the Tank, which followed the progress and journey of the entrepreneurs who appeared in the previous season and their businesses, and Swimming with the Sharks, which traced the sharks personal and professional lives off-camera.

=== Beyond the Tank ===
Ep. no.	Brand	Idea	Previous appearance	Pre Shark Tank revenue	Post Shark Tank revenue
16	Skippi Pops	Ice-pops	Ep 6 (season 1)	—N/a	—N/a
17	Sunfox Technologies	Portable ECG device	Ep 25 (season 1)	₹ 1 lakhs (monthly)	₹ 40 lakhs (monthly)
20	Isak Fragrances	Local perfumes	Ep 26 (season 1)	₹ 3.5 lakhs (monthly)	₹ 30 lakhs (monthly)
25	Beyond Snacks	Banana chips	Ep 8 (season 1)		₹2 crore (monthly)
28	Rare Planet	Handicrafts	Ep 26 (season 1)		
33	Get a Whey	Sugar-free icecream	Ep 21 (season 1)		
36	KG Agrotech	Agricultural Innovations	Ep 24 (season 1)		

== Gateway to Shark Tank India ==
A special episode of Shark Tank India named Gateway to Shark Tank India streamed on 13 March 2023 on SonyLIV.
