= Shark Tank India season 1 =

Indian startup business reality television series

Shark Tank India
- Season 1
- Starring: Ashneer Grover; Aman Gupta; Anupam Mittal; Ghazal Alagh; Namita Thapar; Peyush Bansal; Vineeta Singh; Rannvijay Singh (host)
- No. of episodes: 36

Release
- Original release: 20 December 2021 – 11 February 2022

Season chronology
- Next → Season 2

The first season of Shark Tank India premiered on 20 December 2021 and concluded on 11 February 2022.

== Format ==
The first season received 62,000 aspirants from India, out of which 198 businesses were selected to pitch their ideas to the "sharks". Out of 198 investment pitches at the reality TV show, 67 businesses got deals this season.

== Sharks ==
Any five of the following seven sharks are present in each episode except episodes 34–35.

Shark	Company
Ashneer Grover	ex-Managing Director and co-founder of BharatPe
Aman Gupta	Co-founder and Chief Marketing Officer of boAt Lifestyle
Anupam Mittal	Founder and CEO of Shaadi.com and People Group
Ghazal Alagh	Co-founder and CEO of Mamaearth
Namita Thapar	Executive Director of Emcure Pharmaceuticals
Peyush Bansal	Co-founder and CEO of Lenskart
Vineeta Singh	CEO and co-founder of Sugar Cosmetics

== Pitches and investments by sharks ==
Ep. No.		Pitch No.l	Brand	Idea	City	Original ask	Deal	Invested by						
Ep. No.		Pitch No.l	Brand	Idea	City	Original ask	Deal	Anupam Mittal	Aman Gupta	Ashneer Grover	Namita Thapar	Peyush Bansal	Vineeta Singh	Ghazal Alagh
1		1	BluePine Industries	Frozen Momos	Faridabad	₹50 lakhs for 5% equity	₹75 lakhs for 16% equity		Green checkmark	Green checkmark		—N/a	Green checkmark	—N/a
1		2	Booz scooters	Renting e-bike for mobility in private spaces	Ahmedabad	₹40 lakhs for 15% equity	₹40 lakhs for 50% equity			Green checkmark		—N/a	Green checkmark	—N/a
1		3	Heart up my Sleeves	Detachable Sleeves	New Delhi	₹25 lakhs for 10% equity	₹25 lakhs for 30% equity	Green checkmark				—N/a	Green checkmark	—N/a
2		4	Tagz Foods	Healthy Potato Chips	Bengaluru	₹70 lakhs for 1% equity	₹70 lakhs for 2.75% equity			Green checkmark		—N/a		—N/a
2		5	Head and Heart	Brain Development Course		₹50 lakhs for 5% equity	No Deal					—N/a		—N/a
2		6	Agri Tourism	Rural Tourism		₹50 lakhs for 5% equity	No Deal					—N/a		—N/a
3		7	qZense Labs	Food Freshness Detector	Bengaluru	₹1 crore for 0.25% equity	No Deal					—N/a		—N/a
3		8	Peeschute	Disposable Urine Bag	Jalna	₹75 lakhs for 4% equity	₹75 lakhs for 6% equity		Green checkmark			—N/a		—N/a
3		9	NOCD	Energy Drink	Bengaluru	₹50 lakhs for 2% equity	₹20 lakhs for 15% equity and ₹30 lakhs debt					—N/a	Green checkmark	—N/a
4		10	CosIQ	Intelligent Skincare	Delhi	₹50 lakhs for 7% equity	₹50 lakhs for 25% equity	Green checkmark				—N/a	Green checkmark	—N/a
4		11	JhaJi Achaar	Pickle	Darbhanga	₹50 lakhs for 10% equity	No Deal					—N/a		—N/a
4		12	Bummer	Underwear	Ahmedabad	₹75 lakhs for 4% equity	₹75 lakhs for 7.5% equity		Green checkmark		Green checkmark	—N/a		—N/a
5		13	Revamp Moto	E-Bike	Nashik	₹1 crore for 1% equity	₹1 crore for 1.5% equity	Green checkmark	Green checkmark			—N/a		—N/a
5		14	Hungry Heads	Restaurant serving 80 types of Maggi	Mumbai	₹50 lakhs for 5% equity	No Deal					—N/a		—N/a
5		15	Shrawani Engineers	Belly Button Shaper	Nagpur	₹10 lakhs for 20% equity	No Deal					—N/a		—N/a
6		16	Skippi Pops	Ice-Pops	Hyderabad	₹45 lakhs for 5% equity	₹1 crore for 15% equity	Green checkmark	Green checkmark	Green checkmark	Green checkmark	—N/a	Green checkmark	—N/a
6		17	Menstrupedia	Menstrual Awareness Comic	Ahmedabad	₹50 lakhs for 10% equity	₹50 lakhs for 20% equity				Green checkmark	—N/a		—N/a
6		18	Hecolll	Pollution Resistant Fabric	Hyderabad	₹1 crore for 1% equity	No Deal					—N/a		—N/a
7		19	Raising Superstars	Child Development App	Mumbai	₹1 crore for 2% equity	₹1 crore for 4% equity		Green checkmark	Green checkmark		—N/a		—N/a
7		20	Torchit	Products for visually impaired people	Ahmedabad	₹75 lakhs for 1% equity	No Deal					—N/a		—N/a
7		21	La Kheer Deli	Kheer in variety of flavors	Pune	₹50 lakhs for 7.5% equity	No Deal					—N/a		—N/a
8		22	Beyond Snack	Kerala Banana Chips	Mavelikara	₹50 lakhs for 2.5% equity	₹50 lakhs for 2.5% equity		Green checkmark	Green checkmark			—N/a	—N/a
8		23	Vivalyf Innovations- Easy Life	Prickless Diabetes Testing Machine		₹56 lakhs for 7.5% equity	₹56 lakhs for 33.33% equity	Green checkmark				Green checkmark	—N/a	—N/a
8		24	Motion Breeze	Smart Electric Motorcycle	Vadodara	₹30 lakhs for 3% equity	₹30 lakhs for 6% equity			Green checkmark			—N/a	—N/a
9		25	Altor	Smart Helmets		₹50 lakhs for 5% equity	₹50 lakhs for 7% equity		Green checkmark		Green checkmark		—N/a	—N/a
9		26	Ariro	Wooden Toys		₹50 lakhs for 2.5% equity	₹50 lakhs for 10% equity		Green checkmark			Green checkmark	—N/a	—N/a
9		27	Kabira Handmade	Healthy Oils		₹1 crore for 5% equity	No Deal						—N/a	—N/a
10		28	Nuutjob	Male Intimate Hygiene		₹25 lakhs for 5% equity	₹25 lakhs for 20% equity		Green checkmark		Green checkmark	Green checkmark	—N/a	—N/a
10		29	Meatyour	Eggs		₹30 lakhs for 5% equity	₹30 lakhs for 20% equity	Green checkmark	Green checkmark			Green checkmark	—N/a	—N/a
10		30	EventBeep	Student Community App		₹30 lakhs for 2% equity	₹30 lakhs for 3% equity		Green checkmark	Green checkmark		Green checkmark	—N/a	—N/a
11		31	Gopal's 56	Fiber Ice Cream		₹300 crores for 25% equity	No Deal						—N/a	—N/a
11		32	ARRCOAT Surface Textures	Wall Building		₹50 lakhs for 5% equity	₹50 lakhs for 15% equity	Green checkmark					—N/a	—N/a
11		33	Farda	Customised Streetwear		₹30 lakhs for 10% equity	₹30 lakhs for 20% equity		Green checkmark		Green checkmark		—N/a	—N/a
12		34	Auli Lifestyle	Cosmetics		₹75 lakhs for 4% equity	₹75 lakhs for 15% equity				Green checkmark		—N/a	—N/a
12		35	SweeDesi	Indian Sweets		₹40 lakhs for 3% equity	No Deal						—N/a	—N/a
12		36	LOKA	Metaverse App		₹40 lakhs for 5% equity	₹40 lakhs for 24% equity	Green checkmark	Green checkmark			Green checkmark	—N/a	—N/a
13		37	Annie	Braille Literary Device		₹30 lakhs for 0.5% equity	₹1.05 crore at 3% equity	Green checkmark			Green checkmark	Green checkmark	—N/a	—N/a
13		38	Caragreen	Eco-Friendly boxes		₹50 lakhs for 10% equity	₹50 lakhs for 20% equity	Green checkmark				Green checkmark	—N/a	—N/a
13		39	The Yarn Bazaar	Yarn-Trading App		₹50 lakhs for 2% equity	₹1 crore for 10% equity	Green checkmark	Green checkmark	Green checkmark		Green checkmark	—N/a	—N/a
14		40	The Renal Project	Home Dialysis Treatment		₹1 crore for 3% equity	₹1 crore at 6% equity		Green checkmark		Green checkmark		—N/a	—N/a
14		41	Morikko Pure Foods	Healthy Food Snacks		₹1 crore for 3% equity	No Deal						—N/a	—N/a
14		42	Good Good Piggy Bank	EdFinTech Company		₹45 lakhs for 5% equity	No Deal						—N/a	—N/a
15		43	Hammer Lifestyle	Smart Audio Products		₹30 lakhs for 3% equity	₹1 crore for 40% equity		Green checkmark				—N/a	—N/a
15		44	PNT Robotics	Robotics and Automation Solutions		₹50 lakhs for 4% equity	₹25 lakhs for 25% equity and ₹25 lakhs debt					Green checkmark	—N/a	—N/a
15		45	Cocofit	Coconut based beverage franchise		₹5 for 5% equity	₹5 for 5% equity	Green checkmark	Green checkmark		Green checkmark		—N/a	—N/a
16		46	Bamboo India	Bamboo Products		₹80 lakhs for 4% equity	₹50 lakhs at 3.5% Equity and ₹30 lakhs Debt	Green checkmark		Green checkmark			—N/a	—N/a
16		47	Flying Furr	Dog Hygiene		₹75 lakhs for 7% equity	No Deal						—N/a	—N/a
16		48	Beyond Water	Liquid Water Enhancer		₹75 lakhs for 4% equity	₹75 lakhs for 15% Equity		Green checkmark		Green checkmark		—N/a	—N/a
16		49	Let's Try	Healthy Snacks		₹45 lakhs for 2% equity	₹45 lakhs for 12% Equity	Green checkmark	Green checkmark				—N/a	—N/a
17		50	Find Your Kicks India	Sneaker Resale		₹50 lakhs for 10% equity	₹50 lakhs for 25% equity	Green checkmark	Green checkmark	Green checkmark	Green checkmark	Green checkmark	—N/a	—N/a
17		51	Aas Vidyalaya	EdTech App		₹1.5 crore for 3% equity	₹1.5 Crore for 15% Equity			Green checkmark	Green checkmark	Green checkmark	—N/a	—N/a
17		52	Outbox	Premium Surprise-Planning		₹50 lakhs for 5% equity	No Deal						—N/a	—N/a
17		53	RoadBounce	Pothole Detection Software and Data		₹80 lakhs for 10% equity	₹80 Lakhs for 20% Equity					Green checkmark	—N/a	—N/a
18		54	Mommy's Kitchen	Thin Crust Pizza		₹90 lakhs for 3% equity	No Deal						—N/a	—N/a
18		55	India Hemp and Co	Hemp Food Products		₹50 lakhs for 4% equity	No Deal						—N/a	—N/a
18		56	Dandera Technologies	Electric Auto Vehicle		₹1 crore for 1% equity	₹1 lakh for 1% equity and ₹99 lakhs Debt			Green checkmark			—N/a	—N/a
18		57	Anthyesti	Funeral Service		₹50 lakhs for 2% equity	No Deal						—N/a	—N/a
19		58	Ethik	Leather-free Shoes		₹15 lakhs for 5% equity	No Deal						—N/a	—N/a
19		59	WeSTOCK	Livestock health monitoring AI		₹50 lakhs for 5% equity	₹60 lakhs for 10% equity		Green checkmark	Green checkmark	Green checkmark	Green checkmark	—N/a	—N/a
19		60	KetoIndia	Customised Keto Diets for various medical issues		₹1.5 crore for 1.25% equity	No Deal						—N/a	—N/a
19		61	Magic Lock	LPG Cylinder lock		₹1.2 crore for 8% Equity	No Deal						—N/a	—N/a
20		62	The State Plate	Delicacies		₹65 lakhs 2% Equity	₹40 Lakhs for 3%equity and ₹25 Lakhs Debt					Green checkmark	—N/a	—N/a
20		63	Bakarmax	Comics & Animation		₹35 lakhs 5% Equity	No Deal						—N/a	—N/a
20		64	IN A CAN	Can Cocktails		₹50 lakhs 2% Equity	₹1 Crore for 10% equity	Green checkmark	Green checkmark	Green checkmark	Green checkmark	Green checkmark	—N/a	—N/a
21		65	Get a Whey	Sugar-Free Icecream		₹1 crore 8% Equity	₹1 Crore for 15% equity		Green checkmark	Green checkmark	—N/a		Green checkmark	—N/a
21		66	Sid07 Designs	Inventions		₹47 lakhs 10% Equity	₹25 Lakhs for 75% equity & 22 lakhs Debt				—N/a	Green checkmark		—N/a
21		67	The Quirky Naari	Customised Apparels		₹35 lakhs 5% Equity	₹35 lakhs for 24% equity	Green checkmark			—N/a		Green checkmark	—N/a
22		68	Hair Originals	Natural Hair Extensions		₹60 lakhs 2% Equity	₹60 Lakhs for 4% equity	Green checkmark		Green checkmark	—N/a	Green checkmark		—N/a
22		69	Poo de Cologne	Toilet Spray with Essential Oils		₹75 lakhs 5% Equity	No Deal				—N/a			—N/a
22		70	Moonshine Meads	Meads		₹80 lakhs 0.5% Equity	No Deal				—N/a			—N/a
22		71	Falhari	Fresh Fruits		₹50 lakhs 2% Equity	No Deal				—N/a			—N/a
23		72	Namhya Foods	Ayurvedic Enriched Food		₹1 crore 5% Equity	₹50 lakhs for 10% Equity & ₹50 lakhs Debt		Green checkmark		—N/a			—N/a
23		73	Urban Monkey	Streetwear		₹1 crore 1% Equity	No Deal				—N/a			—N/a
23		74	Guardian Gears	Motorcycle Luggage		₹30 lakhs 5% Equity	No Deal				—N/a			—N/a
23		75	Modern Myth	Bags		₹75 lakhs 5% Equity	No Deal				—N/a			—N/a
24		76	The Sass Bar	Gifts		₹40 lakhs 8% Equity	₹50 lakhs for 35% Equity	Green checkmark	—N/a	—N/a				Green checkmark
24		77	KG Agrotech	Agricultural Innovations		₹30 lakhs 10% Equity	₹10 lakhs for 40% Equity & ₹20 lakhs Debt		—N/a	—N/a		Green checkmark		
24		78	Nuskha Kitchen	Homemade Foods		₹20 lakhs 10% Equity	No Deal		—N/a	—N/a				
25		79	PawsIndia	Dog Products		₹50 lakhs 4% Equity	₹50 lakhs for 15% Equity	Green checkmark	—N/a	—N/a				
25		80	Sunfox Technologies	Portable ECG Device		₹1 crore 2% Equity	₹1 crore for 6% Equity	Green checkmark	—N/a	—N/a	Green checkmark	Green checkmark	Green checkmark	Green checkmark
25		81	Alpino	Roasted Peanut Products		₹1.5 crore 2% Equity	No Deal		—N/a	—N/a				
26		82	Isak Fragrances	Perfumes		₹50 lakhs 8% Equity	₹50 lakhs for 50% Equity		—N/a	—N/a		Green checkmark		
26		83	Julaa Automation	Automatic Cradle		₹50 lakhs 10% Equity	No Deal		—N/a	—N/a				
26		84	Rare Planet	Handicrafts		₹65 lakhs 1% Equity	₹65 lakhs for 3% Equity		—N/a	—N/a	Green checkmark			
27		85	Theka Coffee	Coffee Products		₹50 lakhs 10% Equity	No Deal		—N/a	—N/a				
27		86	Watt Technovations	Ventilated PPE Kits		₹101 2% Equity	₹101 for 4% Equity	Green checkmark	—N/a	—N/a	Green checkmark	Green checkmark		Green checkmark
27		87	Aliste Technologies	Automation Solutions		₹60 lakhs 5% Equity	No Deal		—N/a	—N/a				
27		88	Insurance Samadhan	Insurance Solutions		₹1 crore 1% Equity	₹1 Crore for 4% Equity		—N/a	—N/a		Green checkmark		
28		89	Humpy A2	Organic Milk Products		₹75 lakhs 4% Equity	₹1 Crore for 15% Equity		—N/a	—N/a		Green checkmark	Green checkmark	Green checkmark
28		90	Kunafa World	Kunafa		₹90 lakhs 5% Equity	No Deal		—N/a	—N/a				
28		91	Gold Safe Solutions Ind.	Anti-Suicidal Fan Rod		₹50 lakhs 5% Equity	₹50 lakhs for 30% Equity		—N/a	—N/a		Green checkmark	Green checkmark	Green checkmark
29		92	Wakao Foods	Jackfruit Products		₹75 lakhs 5% Equity	₹75 lakhs for 21% Equity		—N/a	—N/a	Green checkmark		Green checkmark	Green checkmark
29		93	PDD Falcon	Stainless Steel Items		₹75 lakhs for 3% Equity	No Deal		—N/a	—N/a				
29		94	PlayBox TV	Streaming Platform		₹1 Crore for 3.5% Equity	No Deal		—N/a	—N/a				
30		95	Sippline Drinking Shields	Portable Glass Attachment		₹75 lakhs for 15% Equity	No Deal					—N/a		—N/a
30		96	Kabaddi Adda	All-Kabaddi App		₹80 lakhs for 1% Equity	₹80 lakhs for 6% Equity				Green checkmark	—N/a	Green checkmark	—N/a
30		97	Shades of Spring	Flowers		₹3 crores for 1% equity	No Deal					—N/a		—N/a
30		98	Scholify	Scholarship Platform		₹50 lakhs for 7.5% equity	No Deal					—N/a		—N/a
F I N A L E W E E K	31	99	Scrapshala	Handmade Reusable Scrap Materials		₹50 lakhs for 10% equity	No Deal					—N/a		—N/a
F I N A L E W E E K	31	100	Sabjikothi	Vegetables Storage		₹60 lakhs for 2.5% equity	No Deal					—N/a		—N/a
F I N A L E W E E K	31	101	AyuRythm	Ayurvedic Wellness App		₹75 lakhs for 2% Equity	₹75 lakhs for 2.68% Equity		Green checkmark			—N/a		—N/a
F I N A L E W E E K	31	102	Astrix	Smart Locks		₹75 lakhs for 3% Equity	No Deal					—N/a		—N/a
F I N A L E W E E K	32	103	Thea and Sid	Proposal Solutions		₹80 lakhs for 7% Equity	No Deal						—N/a	—N/a
F I N A L E W E E K	32	104	Experential Etc	Technology layered Advertisement Services		₹2 crores for 4% Equity	No Deal						—N/a	—N/a
F I N A L E W E E K	32	105	Grow fitter	Rewards App		₹50 lakhs for 1% Equity	₹50 lakhs for 2% Equity		Green checkmark				—N/a	—N/a
F I N A L E W E E K	32	106	Med Tech	Portable ophthalmic devices		₹35 lakhs for 6% Equity	No Deal						—N/a	—N/a
F I N A L E W E E K	33	107	Colour Me Mad	Insoles		₹40 lakhs for 10% Equity	₹40 lakhs for 25% Equity				Green checkmark		—N/a	—N/a
F I N A L E W E E K	33	108	Mavi's	Vegan Fermented Food		₹40 lakhs for 5% Equity	No Deal						—N/a	—N/a
F I N A L E W E E K	33	109	Tweek Labs	Sportswear		₹40 lakhs for 2% Equity	₹60 lakhs for 10% Equity	Green checkmark		Green checkmark		Green checkmark	—N/a	—N/a
F I N A L E W E E K	33	110	Proxgy	VR		₹35 lakhs for 1% Equity	₹1 crore for 10% Equity			Green checkmark		Green checkmark	—N/a	—N/a
F I N A L E W E E K	34	111	Nomad Food Project	Bacon Jams		₹40 lakhs for 10% Equity	₹40 lakhs for 20% Equity			Green checkmark	Green checkmark		Green checkmark	Green checkmark
F I N A L E W E E K	34	112	Twee in One	Reversible and convertible clothing		₹30 lakhs for 7.5% Equity	No Deal							
F I N A L E W E E K	34	113	Green Protein	Plant-Based Protein		₹60 lakhs for 2% Equity	No Deal							
F I N A L E W E E K	34	114	On2Cook	Fastest Cooking Device		₹1 crore for 1% Equity	No Deal							
F I N A L E W E E K	35	115	Jain Shikanji	Lemonade		₹40 lakhs for 8% Equity	40 lakhs For 30% Equity	Green checkmark	Green checkmark	Green checkmark			Green checkmark	
F I N A L E W E E K	35	116	Woloo	Washroom Finder		₹50 lakhs for 4% Equity	No Deal							
F I N A L E W E E K	35	117	Elcare India	Carenting for Elders		₹1 crore for 2.5% Equity	No Deal							
F I N A L E W E E K	35	118	Lenskart	Eyeware		IN POPULAR CULTURE								
36		118	Sneakare			₹20 lakhs for 5% Equity	21 lakhs for 12% Equity		Green checkmark	—N/a	Green checkmark		Green checkmark	—N/a
36		119	French Crown			₹1.5 crore for 0.33% Equity	No Deal			—N/a				—N/a
36		120	Store My Goods			₹1 crore for 1.75% Equity	50 lakhs for 4% Equity & 50 lakhs Debt @12% interest			—N/a	Green checkmark	Green checkmark		—N/a
36		121	Devnagri			₹1 crore for 1% Equity	No Deal			—N/a				—N/a
Investment								₹5.338Cr	₹9.358Cr	₹5.383Cr	₹6.383Cr	₹8.297Cr	₹3.042Cr	₹1.2Cr
Number of Deals Made								24	28	21	22	27	15	7

Notes

- In Shark Tank India Season 1, approximately Rs. 42 crores was invested in 67 startups by the sharks.
- Later, in season 2, it was seen that JhaJi Achaar got a deal of ₹85 lakhs for 8.45% equity from Namita Thapar, Vineeta Singh and Jharkhand's Angels Network.

Unseen Pitches

These pitches didn't air on TV and ended up without bagging a deal. All the companies are named in alphabetical order.

Brand	Original ask		
Brand	Original ask	Ashwa Pro	50 lakhs for 10% equity
Canebot	1 crore for 2.5% equity		
Clensta	1 crore for 1% equity		
Deciwood	50 lakhs for 3.5% equity		
Eume	1.5 crore for 2% equity		
Gizmoswala	75 lakhs for 5% equity		
Glii	40 lakhs for 4% equity		
Happy Bar	60 lakhs for 2% equity		
Inali Assistive Tech	50 lakhs for 5% equity		
Infiniti Insects	25 lakhs for 10% equity		
Kineer	1 crore for 10% equity		
Mine 4 Nine	75 lakhs for 4% equity		
My Wealth Protector	50 lakhs for 2.5% equity		
Oye Delhi Oye	35 lakhs for 10% equity		
PiChem	40 lakhs for 5% equity		
PicSniff	55 lakhs for 1% equity		
Powertree	1.5 crore for 2.5% equity		
Sattuz	25 lakhs for 5% equity		
Scintiglo	75 lakhs for 1% equity		
Space Kidz	1 crore for 2% equity		
Stanlee India	60 lakhs for 3% equity		
Studio Beej	75 lakhs for 7.5% equity		
Tatasthulive	50 lakhs for 10% equity		
The Iris	10 lakhs for 15% equity		
Urban Naps	50 lakhs for 4% equity		
Zypp Electric	2.2 crore for 1% equity		

== In popular culture ==
The sharks made a guest appearance in the thirteenth season of Kaun Banega Crorepati, and in The Kapil Sharma Show.

Shark Peyush Bansal pitched his company Lenskart on Shark Tank India to his co-sharks in the context of 2010.

== Gateway to Shark Tank India ==
A special episode of Shark Tank India named Gateway to Shark Tank India streamed on 11 February 2022 on SonyLIV.
