= Shark Tank India season 3 =

Third season of business reality show Shark Tank India

Shark Tank India
- Season 3
- Starring: See below
- No. of episodes: 52

Release
- Original network: Sony LIV; Sony Entertainment Television
- Original release: January 22 – March 31, 2024

Season chronology
- ← Previous; Season 2 Next → Season 4

The third season of Shark Tank India aired from 22 January 2024 to 31 March 2024.

== Format ==
Apart from the 6 existing Sharks - Aman Gupta, Amit Jain, Anupam Mittal, Namita Thapar, Vineeta Singh, Peyush Bansal, 6 new Sharks – Ritesh Agarwal, Deepinder Goyal, Azhar Iqubal, Radhika Gupta, Varun Dua and Ronnie Screwvala were introduced. Rahul Dua continued hosting the show.

== Sharks ==
Twelve Entrepreneurs were selected as the sharks for this season, with six of them (Azhar Iqubal, Deepinder Goyal, Radhika Gupta, Ritesh Agarwal, Ronnie Screwvala and Varun Dua) introduced in this edition. Only Five Sharks will be featured in each episode.

Shark	Company
Amit Jain	CEO and co-founder of CarDekho
Aman Gupta	Co-founder and Chief Marketing Officer of boAt
Anupam Mittal	Founder and CEO of Shaadi.com and People Group
Azhar Iqubal	Co-founder and CEO of Inshorts
Deepinder Goyal	Founder and CEO of Zomato
Namita Thapar	Executive Director of Emcure Pharmaceuticals
Peyush Bansal	Co-founder and CEO of Lenskart
Radhika Gupta	Managing Director and CEO of Edelweiss MF
Ritesh Agarwal	CEO and Founder of OYO
Ronnie Screwvala	Co-founder and chairperson, UpGrad
Vineeta Singh	CEO and co-founder of SUGAR Cosmetics
Varun Dua	Founder and CEO of ACKO

== Pitches and investments by sharks ==
Ep. no.	Pitch no.		Brand	Idea	Original ask	Deal	Investment by											
Ep. no.	Pitch no.		Brand	Idea	Original ask	Deal	Aman Gupta	Ritesh Agarwal	Vineeta Singh	Namita Thapar	Anupam Mittal	Peyush Bansal	Amit Jain	Azhar Iqubal	Radhika Gupta	Ronnie Screwvala	Varun Dua	Deepinder Goyal
1	1		The Honest Home	Eco-friendly daily use products	₹ 1 Crore for 2% Equity	₹ 1 Crore for 3% Equity + 1% royalty until ₹ 1.5 Crores are recouped		—N/a				—N/a	Green checkmark	—N/a	—N/a	—N/a	—N/a	—N/a
1	2		Adil Qadri	Perfumes and Attar	₹ 1 Crore for 0.5% Equity	₹ 1 Crore for 1% Equity + 1% royalty until ₹ 1 Crores are recouped		—N/a	Green checkmark			—N/a		—N/a	—N/a	—N/a	—N/a	—N/a
1	3		Conscious Chemist	Skincare Products	₹ 50 Lakhs for 2% Equity	No Deal		—N/a				—N/a		—N/a	—N/a	—N/a	—N/a	—N/a
2	4		The Cinnamon Kitchen	Plant-based healthy snacks	₹ 60 Lakhs for 2% Equity	₹ 60 Lakhs for 5% Equity	Green checkmark	—N/a				—N/a	—N/a	—N/a	—N/a	—N/a	—N/a	
2	5		Wtf Gyms	Gyms service	₹ 1 Crore for 2% Equity	No Deal		—N/a				—N/a	—N/a	—N/a	—N/a	—N/a	—N/a	
2	6		Intervue	Conducts technical interviews online	₹ 1.5 Crores for 1% Equity	₹ 1.5 Crores for 2% Equity	Green checkmark	—N/a				—N/a	—N/a	—N/a	—N/a	—N/a	—N/a	
3	7		Rodbez	Taxi-service for Bihar	₹ 50 Lakhs for 5% Equity	₹ 20 Lakhs for 5% Equity + ₹ 30 Lakhs debt @ 12% for 2 years		Green checkmark	Green checkmark	—N/a			—N/a	—N/a	—N/a	—N/a	—N/a	—N/a
3	8		Blix	Robotics toys	₹ 80 Lakhs for 2% Equity	₹ 80 Lakhs for 4% Equity, Conditional Offer	Green checkmark	Green checkmark		—N/a			—N/a	—N/a	—N/a	—N/a	—N/a	—N/a
3	9		Homversity	Student housing	₹ 65 Lakhs for 2% Equity	No Deal				—N/a			—N/a	—N/a	—N/a	—N/a	—N/a	—N/a
4	10		TURMS	Intelligent Clothing	₹ 1.2 Crores for 2% Equity	₹ 1.2 Crores for 4% Equity		—N/a		—N/a			—N/a	Green checkmark	—N/a	—N/a	—N/a	—N/a
4	11		Mintree	Skin care products	₹ 90 Lakhs for 1% Equity	₹ 90 Lakhs for 1.5% Equity		—N/a		—N/a		Green checkmark	—N/a	Green checkmark	—N/a	—N/a	—N/a	—N/a
4	12		80Wash	Waterless washing machine	₹ 1 Crore for 2.5% Equity	No Deal		—N/a		—N/a			—N/a		—N/a	—N/a	—N/a	—N/a
5	13		Dil foods	Virtual restaurant service	₹ 50 Lakhs for 0.5% Equity	₹ 2 Crores for 2.67% Equity		Green checkmark	Green checkmark	—N/a	—N/a	Green checkmark	—N/a	—N/a	Green checkmark	—N/a	—N/a	—N/a
5	14		AI Kavach	Online security app	₹ 50 Lakhs for 1.25% Equity	₹ 1 Crore for 2.5% Equity + 2.5% Advisory Equity	Green checkmark			—N/a	—N/a	Green checkmark	—N/a	—N/a		—N/a	—N/a	—N/a
5	15		Bartisans	Cocktail and Mocktail brand	₹ 1 Crore for 2.5% Equity	No Deal				—N/a	—N/a		—N/a	—N/a		—N/a	—N/a	—N/a
6	16		Aretto	Kids footwear brand	₹ 80 Lakhs for 1% Equity	No Deal		—N/a					—N/a	—N/a	—N/a	—N/a	—N/a	—N/a
6	17		Kalakaram	DIY kits	₹ 50 Lakhs for 2.5% Equity	₹ 60 Lakhs for 6% Equity		—N/a		Green checkmark	Green checkmark	Green checkmark	—N/a	—N/a	—N/a	—N/a	—N/a	—N/a
6	18		Nabhi Sutra	Ayurvedic oils	₹ 60 Lakhs for 3% Equity	No Deal		—N/a					—N/a	—N/a	—N/a	—N/a	—N/a	—N/a
7	19		Zorko	Food Brand	₹ 1.5 Crores for 1% Equity	No Deal				—N/a			—N/a	—N/a	—N/a	—N/a	—N/a	—N/a
7	20		Tramboo	Kashmir willow bats	₹ 30 Lakhs for 3% Equity	₹ 30 Lakhs for 4% Equity	Green checkmark			—N/a		Green checkmark	—N/a	—N/a	—N/a	—N/a	—N/a	—N/a
7	21		WeHear	Hearing Solutions	₹ 2.5 Crores for 1% Equity	₹ 2.5 Crores for 1% Equity + 1.5% Advisory Equity, Conditional Offer				—N/a		Green checkmark	—N/a	—N/a	—N/a	—N/a	—N/a	—N/a
8	22		Tiggle	Chocolate mixes	₹ 50 Lakhs for 5% Equity	₹ 50 Lakhs for 20% Equity + 2% royalty until ₹ 1 Crores are recouped	—N/a	—N/a	—N/a			Green checkmark	Green checkmark		—N/a	—N/a	—N/a	—N/a
8	23		WYLD Card	Customer as Influencer	₹ 50 Lakhs for 0.5% Equity	₹ 75 Lakhs for 1.5% Equity	—N/a	—N/a	—N/a		Green checkmark				—N/a	—N/a	—N/a	—N/a
8	24		upliance.ai	Smart Cooker	₹ 1 Crore for 1% Equity	No Deal	—N/a	—N/a	—N/a						—N/a	—N/a	—N/a	—N/a
9	25		Pizza Galleria	100% Veg Pizza	₹ 1 Crore for 2% Equity	No Deal		—N/a				—N/a	—N/a	—N/a	—N/a	—N/a	—N/a	
9	26		AI Cars	Hydrogen-powered AI Car	₹ 2 Crores for 4% Equity	No Deal		—N/a				—N/a	—N/a	—N/a	—N/a	—N/a	—N/a	
9	27		Rooftop App	Art Learning platform	₹ 2 Crores for 4% Equity	No Deal		—N/a				—N/a	—N/a	—N/a	—N/a	—N/a	—N/a	
10	28		Goenchi Feni	Alcohol brand	₹ 1 Crore for 5% Equity	₹ 2 Crores for 15% Equity		—N/a				—N/a	—N/a	—N/a	—N/a	—N/a	—N/a	Green checkmark
10	29		Arata	Hair care brand	₹ 1 Crore for 1.25% Equity	₹ 1 Crore for 1.33% Equity + 0.67% Advisory Equity		—N/a	Green checkmark	Green checkmark		—N/a	—N/a	—N/a	—N/a	—N/a	—N/a	
10	30		Vecros	Spatial AI drone	₹ 1 Crore for 2.5% Equity	₹ 20 Lakhs for 1% Equity + ₹ 80 Lakhs debt @ 10% for 3 years	Green checkmark	—N/a				—N/a	—N/a	—N/a	—N/a	—N/a	—N/a	
11	31		Gud Gum	Healthy Chewing Gum brand	₹ 50 Lakhs for 5% Equity	₹ 80 Lakhs for 10% Equity + 4% Royalty until 80Lakhs is Recouped	Green checkmark	Green checkmark	Green checkmark		Green checkmark	—N/a	—N/a	—N/a	—N/a	—N/a	—N/a	—N/a
11	32		Eva Scalp Cooling System	Post Chemo Scalp Cooling brand	₹ 30 Lakhs for 1.2% Equity	₹ 30 Lakhs for 1.8% Equity	Green checkmark	Green checkmark		Green checkmark		—N/a	—N/a	—N/a	—N/a	—N/a	—N/a	—N/a
11	33		Elitty	Teenage Make-up Brand	₹ 1 Crore for 4% Equity	No Deal						—N/a	—N/a	—N/a	—N/a	—N/a	—N/a	—N/a
12	34		HoneyTwigs	Honey Brand	₹ 75 Lakhs for 3% Equity	₹ 75 Lakhs for 3% Equity		Green checkmark		—N/a	Green checkmark	Green checkmark	—N/a	—N/a	—N/a	—N/a	—N/a	—N/a
12	35		Koparo	Coconut based Cleaning Products	₹ 70 Lakhs for 1% Equity	₹ 70 Lakhs for 1% Equity	Green checkmark		Green checkmark	—N/a			—N/a	—N/a	—N/a	—N/a	—N/a	—N/a
12	36		2Ballz	Men's Innerwear Brand	₹ 30 Lakhs for 5% Equity	No Deal				—N/a			—N/a	—N/a	—N/a	—N/a	—N/a	—N/a
13	37		JewelBox	Lab Grown Diamond Jewellery Brand	₹ 1 Crore for 2% Equity	₹ 2 Crores for 6% Equity	Green checkmark	Green checkmark	Green checkmark	—N/a	—N/a	Green checkmark	—N/a	—N/a	Green checkmark	—N/a	—N/a	—N/a
13	38		DaakRoom	Letter Writing Services	₹ 36 Lakhs for 4% Equity	₹ 36 Lakhs for 6% Equity		Green checkmark		—N/a	—N/a		—N/a	—N/a		—N/a	—N/a	—N/a
13	39		Nuvedo	Mushroom Growing Service	₹ 50 Lakhs for 3% Equity	No Deal				—N/a	—N/a		—N/a	—N/a		—N/a	—N/a	—N/a
14	40		WALK	Wearable Mobility Aid	₹ 50 Lakhs for 1.5% Equity	₹ 50 Lakhs for 2.3% Equity	Green checkmark	—N/a			Green checkmark	—N/a		—N/a	—N/a	—N/a	—N/a	—N/a
14	41		Raja Rani Coaching	Clothes Tailoring Academy	₹ 1.3 Crores for 5% Equity	No Deal		—N/a				—N/a		—N/a	—N/a	—N/a	—N/a	—N/a
14	42		Decode Age	Age Longetivity Supplements	₹ 1 Crore for 1.25% Equity	₹ 1 Crore for 2.25% Equity + 1% Royalty until 1.5 Crore is Recouped		—N/a			Green checkmark	—N/a		—N/a	—N/a	—N/a	—N/a	—N/a
15	43		A Little Extra	Hand Made Fabric Jewellery	₹ 48 Lakhs for 6% Equity	₹ 60 Lakhs for 7.5% Equity			Green checkmark		Green checkmark	—N/a	—N/a	—N/a	—N/a	—N/a	—N/a	—N/a
15	44	MATCH OFF	Assembly	Travel Bags	₹ 85 Lakhs for 1% Equity	No Deal						—N/a	—N/a	—N/a	—N/a	—N/a	—N/a	—N/a
15	45	MATCH OFF	Nasher Miles	Travel Bags	₹ 3 Crores for 0.75% Equity	₹ 3 Crores for 1.5% Equity + 1% Royalty until 3 Crore is Recouped	Green checkmark	Green checkmark	Green checkmark	Green checkmark	Green checkmark	—N/a	—N/a	—N/a	—N/a	—N/a	—N/a	—N/a
16	46		Alt Co	Plant-based dairy products	₹ 1.5 Crores for 2% Equity	No Deal		—N/a	—N/a	—N/a			—N/a	—N/a			—N/a	—N/a
16	47		Without	Products made from Waste Plastic	₹ 75 Lakhs for 1% Equity	₹ 75 Lakhs for 3% Equity		—N/a	—N/a	—N/a		Green checkmark	—N/a	—N/a		Green checkmark	—N/a	—N/a
16	48		Kibo by Trestle Labs	Optical Character Recognition	₹ 60 Lakhs for 1% Equity	₹ 60 Lakhs for 6% Equity		—N/a	—N/a	—N/a		Green checkmark	—N/a	—N/a		Green checkmark	—N/a	—N/a
17	49		VOLD	Energy Drink	₹ 50 Lakhs for 2% Equity	₹ 10 Lakhs for 10% Equity + 3% Royalty till 40 Lakhs are recouped	Green checkmark	—N/a				—N/a		—N/a	—N/a	—N/a	—N/a	—N/a
17	50		Quirksmith	Jewellery Brand	₹ 80 Lakhs for 1% Equity	No Deal		—N/a				—N/a		—N/a	—N/a	—N/a	—N/a	—N/a
17	51		Urban Space	Home Interior Brand	₹ 1.8 Crores for 1% Equity	No Deal		—N/a				—N/a		—N/a	—N/a	—N/a	—N/a	—N/a
18	52		HyperLab	Sports Tech Brand	₹ 10 Lakhs for 1% Equity	₹ 25 Lakhs for 1% Equity	Green checkmark	—N/a				—N/a		—N/a	—N/a	—N/a	—N/a	—N/a
18	53		ECO BioTraps	Mosquito Breeding Prevention	₹ 50 Lakhs for 2% Equity	No Deal		—N/a				—N/a		—N/a	—N/a	—N/a	—N/a	—N/a
18	54		Hoora	Auto Care App	₹ 80 lakhs for 2% Equity	No Deal		—N/a				—N/a		—N/a	—N/a	—N/a	—N/a	—N/a
19	55		Yes Madam	App-based Home Salon Service	₹ 1.5 Crores for 0.5% Equity	₹ 1.5 Crores for 2% Equity + 2% Equity till 1.5 Crore is Recouped	Green checkmark	Green checkmark	Green checkmark	—N/a	—N/a	Green checkmark	—N/a	—N/a		—N/a	—N/a	—N/a
19	56		ZeroDor	Waterless Urinals	₹ 1 Crore for 3% Equity	No Deal				—N/a	—N/a		—N/a	—N/a		—N/a	—N/a	—N/a
19	57		Toffee Coffee Roasters	Coffee Brand	₹ 60 Lakhs for 2% Equity	₹ 36 Lakhs for 2.33% Equity + 25 Lakhs debt @10% for 3years		Green checkmark		—N/a	—N/a		—N/a	—N/a		—N/a	—N/a	—N/a
20	58		Push Sports	Sports Solutions Company	₹ 80 Lakhs for 1% Equity	₹ 80 Lakhs for 4% Equity + 2% Royalty till 1.6 Crores are Recouped		—N/a	Green checkmark	—N/a		Green checkmark	—N/a		—N/a	—N/a	—N/a	—N/a
20	59		ORBO AI	AI-based Beauty Advisor	₹ 1 Crore for 0.75% Equity	₹ 1 Crore for 1% Equity		—N/a	Green checkmark	—N/a			—N/a		—N/a	—N/a	—N/a	—N/a
20	60		Cannazo India	Cannabis based Products	₹ 1.5 Crores for 5% Equity	No Deal		—N/a		—N/a			—N/a		—N/a	—N/a	—N/a	—N/a
21	61		Chefling	DIY Food Products	₹ 40 Lakhs for 10% Equity	₹ 40 Lakhs for 16% Equity	—N/a	—N/a	—N/a	Green checkmark		Green checkmark	Green checkmark	Green checkmark	—N/a	—N/a	—N/a	—N/a
21	62		Intense Focus	Designer Eye Wear Brand	₹ 5 Crores for 5% Equity	No Deal	—N/a	—N/a	—N/a						—N/a	—N/a	—N/a	—N/a
21	63		Millet Amma	Millet based Products	₹ 1 Crore for 3% Equity	No Deal	—N/a	—N/a	—N/a						—N/a	—N/a	—N/a	—N/a
22	64		D'chica	Innerwears for Teenage Girls	₹ 80 Lakhs for 1% Equity	₹ 80 Lakhs for 2% Equity		—N/a	Green checkmark	Green checkmark		—N/a		—N/a	—N/a	—N/a	—N/a	—N/a
22	65		Refit	Refurbished Phones brand	₹ 2 Crores for 0.5% Equity	₹ 2 Crores for 1% Equity + 1% Royalty until 3 Crores are recouped		—N/a	Green checkmark		Green checkmark	—N/a	Green checkmark	—N/a	—N/a	—N/a	—N/a	—N/a
22	66		House of Beauty India	Skin care Products	₹ 1.5 Crores for 5% Equity	No Deal		—N/a				—N/a		—N/a	—N/a	—N/a	—N/a	—N/a
23	67		Artinci	Zero Sugar Desserts	₹ 50 Lakhs for 1.75% Equity	₹ 50 Lakhs for 5% Equity + 1% Royalty till 75 Lakhs are Recouped		—N/a	Green checkmark				—N/a	—N/a	—N/a	—N/a	—N/a	—N/a
23	68		The Rage Room	Anger Management activities	₹ 20 Lakhs for 30% Equity	No Deal		—N/a					—N/a	—N/a	—N/a	—N/a	—N/a	—N/a
23	69		Aastey	Athleisure Wear Company	₹ 80 Lakhs for 2% Equity	No Deal		—N/a					—N/a	—N/a	—N/a	—N/a	—N/a	—N/a
24	70		Matri	Period Pain Relieving Devices	₹ 60 Lakhs for 4% Equity	₹ 60 Lakhs for 4% Equity	Green checkmark			Green checkmark		—N/a	—N/a	—N/a	—N/a	—N/a	—N/a	—N/a
24	71		Rubbabu	Rubber Foam Toys	₹ 2 Crores for 5% Equity	No Deal						—N/a	—N/a	—N/a	—N/a	—N/a	—N/a	—N/a
24	72		Gulabo Jaipur	Traditional Jaipur Clothing	₹ 90 Lakhs for 1% Equity	No Deal						—N/a	—N/a	—N/a	—N/a	—N/a	—N/a	—N/a
25	73		Arista Vault	Smart Luggage Bags	₹ 45 Lakhs for 1% Equity	₹ 20 Lakhs for 1% Equity + 25 Lakhs Debt @18% for 2 years		—N/a		—N/a	Green checkmark	—N/a	—N/a	—N/a		—N/a		—N/a
25	74		Tohands	Smart Calculator with Ledger	₹ 55 Lakhs for 1% Equity	₹ 60 Lakhs for 2% Equity		—N/a		—N/a		—N/a	—N/a	—N/a	Green checkmark	—N/a	Green checkmark	—N/a
25	75		Plus Gold	Gold and Jewellery Savings App	₹ 60 Lakhs for 1% Equity	₹ 60 Lakhs for 1.5% Equity		—N/a		—N/a		—N/a	—N/a	—N/a		—N/a	Green checkmark	—N/a
26	76		Aroleap	Smart Home Gym	₹ 1 Crore for 2.5% Equity	₹ 1 Crore for 5% Equity	—N/a	—N/a	—N/a		Green checkmark	Green checkmark	Green checkmark	Green checkmark	—N/a	—N/a	—N/a	—N/a
26	77		Cosmix	Herbal Super Supplements	₹ 1 Crore for 1% Equity	₹ 1 Crore for 1% Equity + 1% Royalty till 1 Crore is Recouped	—N/a	—N/a	—N/a	Green checkmark					—N/a	—N/a	—N/a	—N/a
26	78		Fabriclore	Custom Fabric Sourcing	₹ 68.10 Lakhs for 1% Equity	No Deal	—N/a	—N/a	—N/a						—N/a	—N/a	—N/a	—N/a
27	79		Polish Me Pretty	Nail Art Brand	₹ 25 Lakhs for 25% Equity	₹ 25 Lakhs for 25% Equity		—N/a				Green checkmark	—N/a	—N/a	—N/a	—N/a	—N/a	—N/a
27	80		GridMats by PotholeRaja	Mats for Concrete Road making	₹ 5 Crores for 2% Equity	No Deal		—N/a					—N/a	—N/a	—N/a	—N/a	—N/a	—N/a
27	81		Uncle Peter Pancakes	Pancake focused QSR	₹ 60 Lakhs for 2% Equity	₹ 60 Lakhs for 2.4% Equity + 3% Royalty till 1.2 Crores is Recouped		—N/a	Green checkmark	Green checkmark	Green checkmark		—N/a	—N/a	—N/a	—N/a	—N/a	—N/a
28	82		Creative Hatti	Graphic Sticker Designing Brand	₹ 60 Lakhs for 2% Equity	No Deal		—N/a				—N/a		—N/a	—N/a	—N/a	—N/a	—N/a
28	83	MATCH OFF	Candid Men	Fashion Rental Platform for Men	₹ 60 Lakhs for 2% Equity	₹ 60 Lakhs for 5% Equity (3% will be given back to founder if 2Cr PAT is achieved)		—N/a	Green checkmark			—N/a	Green checkmark	—N/a	—N/a	—N/a	—N/a	—N/a
28	84	MATCH OFF	Flyrobe	Fashion Rental Platform for Men and Women	₹ 50 Lakhs for 1% Equity	₹ 50 Lakhs for 4% Equity	Green checkmark	—N/a				—N/a		—N/a	—N/a	—N/a	—N/a	—N/a
29	85		Wiselife	Yoga Accessories	₹ 60 Lakh for 2% Equity	₹ 1.2 Crores for 4% Equity	Green checkmark	Green checkmark	—N/a	Green checkmark	Green checkmark	—N/a		—N/a	—N/a	—N/a	—N/a	—N/a
29	86		Cervicheck	Cervical Cancer Screening Test Kits	₹ 75 Lakhs for 1.5% Equity	₹ 75 Lakhs for 5% Equity			—N/a	Green checkmark		—N/a		—N/a	—N/a	—N/a	—N/a	—N/a
29	87		Eatverse	Multi brand Cloud Kitchen	₹ 1 crore for 1% equity	No Deal			—N/a			—N/a		—N/a	—N/a	—N/a	—N/a	—N/a
30	88		Avataar Skincare	Skincare Services	₹ 70 Lakh for 1% Equity	₹ 35 Lakhs for 0.5% Equity + 35 Lakhs Debt @14% for 3 years	Green checkmark	—N/a			Green checkmark		—N/a	—N/a	—N/a	—N/a	—N/a	—N/a
30	89		Chalte Firte Mangal-karyalaya	Portable Wedding Hall	₹ 2 Crores for 10% Equity	No Deal		—N/a					—N/a	—N/a	—N/a	—N/a	—N/a	—N/a
30	90		Kryzen Biotech	Hydroponic Farming	₹ 75 Lakhs for 3% equity	₹ 75 Lakhs for 15% Equity + 2% Royalty till 1.5 Crores is Recouped		—N/a				Green checkmark	—N/a	—N/a	—N/a	—N/a	—N/a	—N/a
31	91		FOMO Brews	Ice Tea Brand	₹ 35 Lakhs for 4% Equity	₹ 35 Lakhs for 6% Equity	Green checkmark		—N/a		Green checkmark	—N/a		—N/a	—N/a	—N/a	—N/a	—N/a
31	92		Model Verse	Advance AI based Image Model Wrapper	₹ 25 Lakhs for 10% Equity	₹ 25 Lakhs for 10% Equity		Green checkmark	—N/a		Green checkmark	—N/a	Green checkmark	—N/a	—N/a	—N/a	—N/a	—N/a
31	93		Vikrant Bikes	Hydrogen Ethanol fuel based bike	₹ 30 Lakhs for 5% equity	No Deal			—N/a			—N/a		—N/a	—N/a	—N/a	—N/a	—N/a
32	94		The Shell Hair	Hair Extension Brand	₹ 30 Lakhs for 3% Equity	₹ 30 Lakhs for 3% Equity	Green checkmark		—N/a			—N/a		—N/a	—N/a	—N/a	—N/a	—N/a
32	95		RIZE	Energy Bars	₹ 45 Lakhs for 6% Equity	No Deal			—N/a			—N/a		—N/a	—N/a	—N/a	—N/a	—N/a
32	96		MEPACK	Custom Gym Subscription	₹ 7 Lakhs for 10% Equity	₹ 7 Lakhs for 10% Equity		Green checkmark	—N/a			—N/a	Green checkmark	—N/a	—N/a	—N/a	—N/a	—N/a
33	97		Bacca Bucci	Footwear Brand	₹ 2.5 Crores for 1% Equity	No Deal		—N/a				—N/a	—N/a	—N/a	—N/a	—N/a	—N/a	
33	98		Vobble	Kids Audio Platform	₹ 25 Lakhs for 1.5% Equity	₹ 25 Lakhs for 2% Equity		—N/a		Green checkmark		—N/a	—N/a	—N/a	—N/a	—N/a	—N/a	
33	99		Be U Natural	Hair Salon	₹ 60 Lakhs for 2.5% Equity	No Deal		—N/a				—N/a	—N/a	—N/a	—N/a	—N/a	—N/a	
34	100		Erotissch	Lingerie and Swimwear Brand	₹ 75 Lakhs for 3% Equity	No Deal		—N/a		—N/a			—N/a		—N/a	—N/a	—N/a	—N/a
34	101		Niblerzz	Sugar Free Candy	₹ 50 Lakhs for 3% Equity	₹ 10 Lakhs for 5% Equity + 40 Lakhs debt @10% for 2years	Green checkmark	—N/a		—N/a			—N/a		—N/a	—N/a	—N/a	—N/a
34	102		SORICH	Guilt free Snacks	₹ 90 Lakhs for 2.5% Equity	No Deal		—N/a		—N/a			—N/a		—N/a	—N/a	—N/a	—N/a
35	103		Littlebox	Fast fashion D2C brand	₹ 75 Lakhs for 1% Equity	₹ 75 Lakhs for 2.5% Equity	Green checkmark	—N/a	Green checkmark	Green checkmark	Green checkmark	—N/a	Green checkmark	—N/a	—N/a	—N/a	—N/a	—N/a
35	104		Creme Castle	Customised Cakes and bakery products	₹ 60 Lakhs for 1.5% Equity	₹ 60 Lakhs for 2.5% Equity		—N/a				—N/a	Green checkmark	—N/a	—N/a	—N/a	—N/a	—N/a
35	105		Namakwali	Organic Spices	₹ 50 Lakhs for 5% Equity	₹ 10 Lakhs for 5% Equity + 40 Lakhs debt @8% for 3years		—N/a				—N/a	Green checkmark	—N/a	—N/a	—N/a	—N/a	—N/a
36	106		Karibo Cosmetics	Customised Lipstick brand	₹ 80 Lakhs for 5% Equity	No Deal				—N/a	—N/a		—N/a	—N/a		—N/a	—N/a	—N/a
36	107		Deeva	Online Saree Platform	₹ 2 Crores for 4% Equity	₹ 75 Lakhs for 6% Equity + 1.25 Crores debt @10% for 3years	Green checkmark	Green checkmark		—N/a	—N/a		—N/a	—N/a	Green checkmark	—N/a	—N/a	—N/a
36	108		Design Template	Online Design Marketplace	₹ 1 Crore for 2.5% Equity	₹ 1 Crore for 10% Equity	Green checkmark			—N/a	—N/a		—N/a	—N/a		—N/a	—N/a	—N/a
37	109		Sama	Online Despite Resolution	₹ 1 Crore for 1% Equity	₹ 1 Crore for 1.5% Equity	Green checkmark	Green checkmark	—N/a	Green checkmark		—N/a		—N/a	—N/a	—N/a	—N/a	—N/a
37	110		Golden Feathers	Fabrics made from Butchery Chicken Waste	₹ 5 Crores for 5% Equity	No Deal			—N/a			—N/a		—N/a	—N/a	—N/a	—N/a	—N/a
37	111		Myracle.io	4D Edutainment	₹ 1.2 Crores for 3% Equity	No Deal			—N/a			—N/a		—N/a	—N/a	—N/a	—N/a	—N/a
38	112		Cup-ji	Flavoured Instant Tea in Cups	₹ 50 Lakhs for 5% Equity	No Deal		—N/a				—N/a		—N/a	—N/a	—N/a	—N/a	—N/a
38	113		A Toddler Thing	Baby Clothing and Essentials	₹ 80 Lakhs for 2% Equity	₹ 40 Lakhs for 2% Equity + 40 Lakhs Debt @ 3% Royalty till 40 Lakhs are Recouped		—N/a				—N/a	Green checkmark	—N/a	—N/a	—N/a	—N/a	—N/a
38	114		FlexifyMe	Body Pain Management Platform	₹ 1 Crore for 2% Equity	₹ 50 Lakhs for 1.32% Equity + 50 Lakhs Debt @ 10% for 2 Years		—N/a		Green checkmark		—N/a		—N/a	—N/a	—N/a	—N/a	—N/a
39	115		Dharaksha Ecosolution	Sustainable Material Science Company	₹ 1,250 for 1% Equity + 100Hours	₹ 1,250 for 1% Equity + 100Hours	Green checkmark	Green checkmark	Green checkmark	—N/a	Green checkmark	Green checkmark	—N/a	—N/a	—N/a	—N/a	—N/a	—N/a
39	116		iDreamCareer	Career Counseling Platform	₹ 1.10 Croresfor 1.28% Equity	₹ 60 Lakhs for 1% Equity + 50 Lakhs Debt @ 8% for 3 years	Green checkmark	Green checkmark		—N/a			—N/a	—N/a	—N/a	—N/a	—N/a	—N/a
39	117		Rock Paper Rum	Innovative Indian Rum Brand	₹ 50 Lakhs for 2% Equity	₹ 20 Lakhs for 1% Equity + 30 Lakhs Debt @ 10% for 2 years			Green checkmark	—N/a			—N/a	—N/a	—N/a	—N/a	—N/a	—N/a
40	118		Fit n Flex	Healthy Snacking and Cereal Brand	₹ 1 Crore for 3% Equity	No Deal		—N/a				—N/a	—N/a	—N/a	—N/a	—N/a	—N/a	
40	119		Sukham	Mens Sexual Wellness Brand	₹ 1 Crore for 3.33% Equity	No Deal		—N/a				—N/a	—N/a	—N/a	—N/a	—N/a	—N/a	
40	120		Smotect	Nicotine free tablets to quit smoking	₹ 1 Crore for 1% Equity	₹ 50 Lakhs for 5% Equity + 50 Lakhs Debt @ 15% for 3 years		—N/a			Green checkmark	—N/a	—N/a	—N/a	—N/a	—N/a	—N/a	
41	121		Katidhan	Autonomous Light Deterrence System	₹ 1.5 Crores for 2.5% Equity	₹ 75 Lakhs for 5% Equity + 75 Lakhs Debt @ 10% for 3 years		Green checkmark				—N/a	—N/a	—N/a	—N/a	—N/a	—N/a	—N/a
41	122		NEMA AI	AI and Neuroscience based EdTech Platform	₹ 80 Lakhs for 5% Equity	₹ 40 Lakhs for 8% Equity + 40 Lakhs Debt @ 10% for 3 years			Green checkmark	Green checkmark		—N/a	—N/a	—N/a	—N/a	—N/a	—N/a	—N/a
41	123		Maple Pods	Tech Hospitality and Entertainment Company	₹ 1.5 Crores for 5% Equity	No Deal						—N/a	—N/a	—N/a	—N/a	—N/a	—N/a	—N/a
42	124		SPEC OPS	Tactical clothing for Military	₹ 80 Lakhs for 2% Equity	₹ 40 Lakhs for 2% Equity + 40 Lakhs Debt @ 12% for 2 years	Green checkmark	—N/a				—N/a	Green checkmark	—N/a	—N/a	—N/a	—N/a	—N/a
42	125		Kaabil Kids	Online Chess Training Academy	₹ 70 Lakhs for 2% Equity	₹ 50 Lakhs for 2 5% Equity + 20 Lakhs Debt @ 12% for 2 years	Green checkmark	—N/a		Green checkmark		—N/a		—N/a	—N/a	—N/a	—N/a	—N/a
42	126		Odd Giraffe	Journals and Planners for Mental Wellness	₹ 75 Lakhs for 7.5% Equity	No Deal		—N/a				—N/a		—N/a	—N/a	—N/a	—N/a	—N/a
43	127		Nemocare Raksha	Neonatal Wearable Vital Monitor	₹ 1 Crore for 2.5%	₹ 20 Lakhs for 0.67% Equity + 80 Lakhs Debt @ 10% for 2 years	Green checkmark			—N/a	—N/a		—N/a	—N/a		—N/a	—N/a	—N/a
43	128		WhySoBlue	Clothing Brand	₹ 75 Lakhs for 3% Equity	₹ 40 Lakhs for 3% Equity + 35 Lakhs Debt @ 10% for 3 years		Green checkmark		—N/a	—N/a		—N/a	—N/a		—N/a	—N/a	—N/a
43	129		Coratia Technologies	Unmanned Underwater Robots	₹ 80 Lakhs for 1% Equity	₹ 80 Lakhs for 1% Equity		Green checkmark		—N/a	—N/a		—N/a	—N/a		—N/a	—N/a	—N/a
44	130		CoolAnt	Nature-Based Cooling Technology	₹ 90 Lakhs for 1% Equity	No Deal						—N/a	—N/a	—N/a	—N/a	—N/a	—N/a	—N/a
44	131		Xmachines	Robotics and AI for Agriculture	₹ 72 Lakhs for 4% Equity	₹ 72 Lakhs for 4% Equity		Green checkmark		Green checkmark		—N/a	—N/a	—N/a	—N/a	—N/a	—N/a	—N/a
44	132		Luvottica	Love-Making Furniture	₹ 2 Crores for 10% Equity	No Deal						—N/a	—N/a	—N/a	—N/a	—N/a	—N/a	—N/a
45	133		Farmdidi	Food Business training App	₹ 50 Lakhs for 2% Equity	₹ 1 Crore for 10% Equity		—N/a	Green checkmark			Green checkmark	—N/a	—N/a	—N/a	—N/a	—N/a	—N/a
45	134		Popcorn & Company	Ready to Eat Popcorn	₹ 75 Lakhs for 7.5% Equity	₹ 75 Lakhs for 15% Equity + 3% Royalty until 75 Lakhs is Recouped		—N/a		Green checkmark			—N/a	—N/a	—N/a	—N/a	—N/a	—N/a
45	135		Prorata	Fractional Car Ownership Platform	₹ 1 Crore for 2% Equity	₹ 50 Lakhs for 10% Equity + 50 Lakhs Debt @14% Interest		—N/a			Green checkmark	Green checkmark	—N/a	—N/a	—N/a	—N/a	—N/a	—N/a
46	136		Indigifts	Gifts tech company	₹ 50 Lakhs for 2% Equity	₹ 50 Lakhs for 4% Equity		Green checkmark	Green checkmark	—N/a			—N/a	—N/a	—N/a	—N/a	—N/a	—N/a
46	137		FuelV by Alien Version	Smart Fuel Caps	₹ 50 Lakhs for 5% Equity	No Deal				—N/a			—N/a	—N/a	—N/a	—N/a	—N/a	—N/a
46	138		Rocca	Premium Chocolate Brand	₹ 60 Lakhs for 4% Equity	₹ 30 Lakhs for 2.5% Equity + 30 Lakhs debt @9% for 3 years		Green checkmark		—N/a			—N/a	—N/a	—N/a	—N/a	—N/a	—N/a
47	139		Kiko Live	Listing and Creating Websites for Kirana Sellers	₹ 1 Crore for 1% Equity	No Deal		—N/a				—N/a	—N/a	—N/a	—N/a	—N/a	—N/a	
47	140		Melooha	AI Powered Astrology Platform	₹ 80 Lakhs for 2% Equity	No Deal		—N/a				—N/a	—N/a	—N/a	—N/a	—N/a	—N/a	
47	141		FUTR Studios	Virtual Influencer for Businesses	₹ 1 Crore for 2% Equity	No Deal		—N/a				—N/a	—N/a	—N/a	—N/a	—N/a	—N/a	
48	142		Allter	Certified Organic Rash-Free Diapers	₹ 1 Crore for 2.5% Equity	₹ 1 Crore for 4% Equity	Green checkmark	Green checkmark	—N/a		Green checkmark	—N/a		—N/a	—N/a	—N/a	—N/a	—N/a
48	143		First Bud Organics	Organic Products	₹ 50 Lakhs for 7% Equity	₹ 50 Lakhs for 10% Equity		Green checkmark	—N/a			—N/a		—N/a	—N/a	—N/a	—N/a	—N/a
48	144		Shararat	Bedroom Fashion Brand	₹ 60 Lakhs for 2% Equity	No Deal			—N/a			—N/a		—N/a	—N/a	—N/a	—N/a	—N/a
49	145		Competishun	Coaching classes for IIT/JEE	₹ 2 Crores for 1% Equity	No Deal		—N/a		—N/a			—N/a		—N/a	—N/a	—N/a	—N/a
49	146		Bombay Closet Cleanse	Thrift Platform Buy-Sell-Rent	₹ 1 Crore for 2.5% Equity	No Deal		—N/a		—N/a			—N/a		—N/a	—N/a	—N/a	—N/a
49	147		Kiosk Kaffee	Premium Coffee Brand	₹ 90 Lakhs for 3% Equity	No Deal		—N/a		—N/a			—N/a		—N/a	—N/a	—N/a	—N/a
50	148		Neon Attack	Premium Quality Neon Signs	₹ 75 Lakhs for 3% Equity	₹ 50 Lakhs for 2% Equity + ₹ 25 Lakhs at 2% royalty until ₹ 50 Lakhs are recouped	Green checkmark	—N/a		Green checkmark		—N/a		—N/a	—N/a	—N/a	—N/a	—N/a
50	149		P-Tal	Copper, Brass, and Bronze Kitchenware	₹ 50 Lakhs for 1% Equity	₹ 1 Crore for 3.2% Equity	Green checkmark	—N/a	Green checkmark	Green checkmark	Green checkmark	—N/a	Green checkmark	—N/a	—N/a	—N/a	—N/a	—N/a
50	150		Road Pilot	App for Truck Drivers and Fleet Owners	₹ 80 Lakhs for 5% Equity	No Deal		—N/a				—N/a		—N/a	—N/a	—N/a	—N/a	—N/a
51	GATEWAY TO SHARK TANK INDIA	151	Smart Mop by CASPIAN	Fast mop for Efficient & Quick Cleaning	₹ 15 Lakhs for 1% Equity	No Deal		—N/a				—N/a	—N/a		—N/a	—N/a	—N/a	—N/a
51	GATEWAY TO SHARK TANK INDIA	152	Lea Clothing	Women's Fashion Apparel	₹ 1 Crore for 2% Equity	₹ 1 Crore for 4% Equity + 2% Royalty until ₹ 1.5 Crores is recouped		—N/a	Green checkmark	Green checkmark	Green checkmark	—N/a	—N/a	Green checkmark	—N/a	—N/a	—N/a	—N/a
51	GATEWAY TO SHARK TANK INDIA	153	$Krishnarama	Telugu Movie	₹ 2 Crore for 30% Equity	No Deal		—N/a				—N/a	—N/a		—N/a	—N/a	—N/a	—N/a
51	GATEWAY TO SHARK TANK INDIA	154	Rentit4me	Rental Marketplace	₹ 1.5 Crore for 5% Equity	No Deal		—N/a				—N/a	—N/a		—N/a	—N/a	—N/a	—N/a
52	Ecopreneur Special	155	Cool The Globe	Carbon Footprint Reduction App	₹ 25 Lakhs for 5% Equity	₹ 25 Lakhs for 8% Equity	Green checkmark	—N/a	—N/a			—N/a	—N/a		Green checkmark	—N/a	—N/a	—N/a
52	Ecopreneur Special	156	Canvaloop Fibre	Agri-Waste to Fibres & Yarns	₹ 1 Crore for 1.33% Equity	₹ 2 Crore for 4 % Equity	Green checkmark	—N/a	—N/a	Green checkmark	Green checkmark	—N/a	—N/a	Green checkmark	Green checkmark	—N/a	—N/a	—N/a
52	Ecopreneur Special	157	DigitalPaani	Wastewater Management Platform	₹ 70 Lakhs for 1% Equity	No Deal		—N/a	—N/a			—N/a	—N/a			—N/a	—N/a	—N/a
Number of Deals Made							36	26	25	23	22	20	14	6	6	2	2	1

== Beyond the Tank ==
Ep. No.	Brand	Idea	Previous appearance	Pre Shark Tank Status	Post Shark Tank Status
12	BluePine Foods (MomoMami)	Frozen Momos	Ep 1 (Season 1)	—N/a	—N/a
19	COSIQ	Intelligent Skincare	Ep 4 (Season 1)	4 Lakhs Per Month	1 Crore Per Month
20	ABC Fitness Academy	Sports and Fitness Training	Ep 11 (Season 2)	—N/a	52 Lakhs Per Month
26	Dobiee	Candy Brand	Ep 15 (Season 2)	—N/a	—N/a
39	Padcare	Menstrual Pad Recycling and Disposal	Ep 23 (Season 2)	100 KGS per day and 2,000 services per year	1,500 KGS per day and 25,000 services per year (1,150% Growth Rate)
41	Janitri	Pregnancy Monitoring Device	Ep 12 (Season 2)	80 Rural hosp, 30,000 women monitored, 3,000 lives saved	180 Rural hosp, 75,000 women monitored, 8,000 lives saved
46	Rare Planet	Handicrafts	Ep 26 (Season 1)	4 Stores	50 Stores, 1st Successful exit for a shark in Shark Tank India in January 2024
47	FastBeetle	Delivery Service in Kashmir	Ep 15 (Season 2)	—N/a	—N/a
49	Haqdarshak	Availing Government Schemes	Ep 6 (Season 2)	6 Lakhs People Impacted, 1,000 Women Entrepreneurs, 5 Physical Centres, 4,000 Crores benefits from Govt schemes	30 Lakhs People Impacted, 6,000 Women Entrepreneurs, 63 Physical Centres, 15,000 Crores benefits from Govt Schemes
50	Flatheads	Sneakers	Ep 5 (Season 2)	—N/a	—N/a
