= Anupam Mittal =

Indian entrepreneur and investor

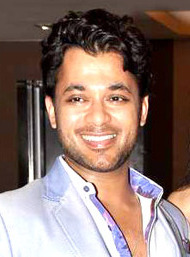
- Born: 23 December 1971 (age 54); Bombay, Maharashtra, India (present-day Mumbai)
- Education: Boston College
- Occupations: Entrepreneur; Businessperson; Investor
- Years active: 1996–present
- Organization: Shaadi.com
- Television: Shark Tank India (2021–present)
- Spouse: Aanchal Kumar (m. 2013)
- Children: 1

Anupam Mittal (born 23 December 1971) is an Indian entrepreneur, business executive and angel investor. He is the founder and CEO of People Group and Shaadi.com. Apart from starting Shaadi.com, an Indian online wedding service, he has also been a prominent investor in Shark Tank Season 1, 2, 3, 4 and 5, investing in over 250 companies. He was also the co-founder and chairperson of the Internet and Mobile Association of India (IAMAI) from 2006 to 2007 and is currently on its Governing Council. He is the recipient of the Karmaveer Chakra Award. He has also acted in and produced Bollywood films such as 99 and Flavors.

== Early life and education ==
He was born in Mumbai, India, and did his schooling at Jai Hind College. He graduated from Boston College, Massachusetts. He did his MBA in Operations and Strategic Management.

== Career ==
Following his graduation, Mittal worked at MicroStrategy as a product manager. A personal experience with a matrimonial consultant sparked an idea. He then started Sagai.com in 1997, the first of its kind, an online matrimonial portal now known as Shaadi.com. After Shaadi.com, Mittal started India’s first mobile gaming company, Mauj Mobile and India’s property marketplaces, Makaan.com. He served as the Chairperson of the Internet and Mobile Association of India (IAMAI) from 2006–2007.

=== Startups and investments ===
Anupam Mittal was one of the earliest investors in Ola Cabs, one of India's biggest mobility start-ups. Mittal has been an angel investor in over 250 startups before Shark Tank in sectors such as clean technology, consumer internet, mobile, healthcare and SaaS. Some notable investments are Rupeek, Agnikul, Basic Home Loan, Animall, Interactive Avenues, BigBasket, Mitigata-Smart Cyber Insurance, Rapido and WhatFix.

=== Shark Tank ===
Mittal has been a "Shark" on the SonyLIV reality program Shark Tank India in Seasons 1, 2 and 3. In Season 1, he invested ₹54,000,000 (US$680,000) across 25 businesses, whereas In Season 2,₹54,000,000 (US$580,000) across 25 businesses whereas In Season 3 he invested close to ₹80,500,000 (US$860,000) in companies.

==== Films and entertainment ====
Mittal also acted and produced in the Bollywood movies 99 and Flavors, directed by his close friends Raj & DK. On television, Mittal has appeared in Seasons 1 and 2 of the Indian business reality show Shark Tank India. As part of the promotions for Shark Tank India, Mittal has appeared in several other television and shows, like Amitabh Bachchan’s Kaun Banega Crorepati and The Kapil Sharma Show.

== Personal life ==
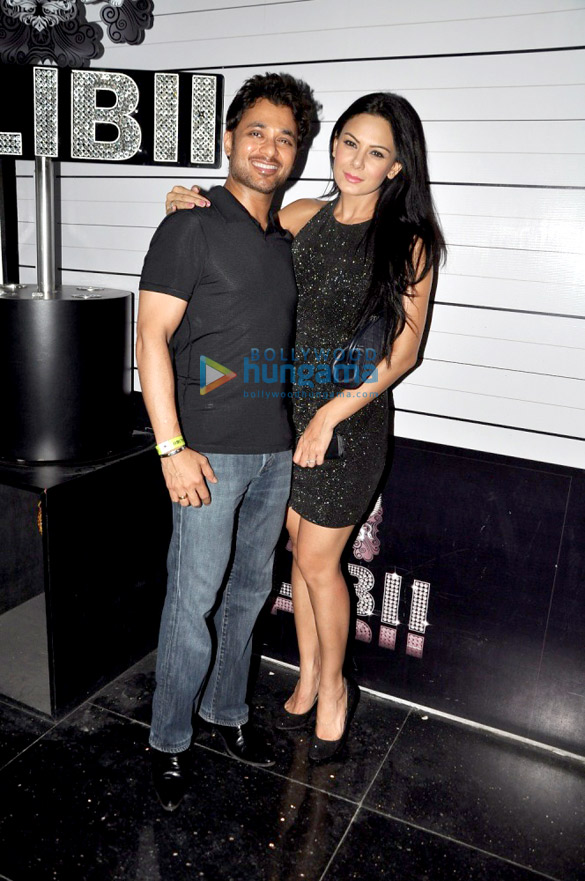
Mittal with his wife Aanchal Kumar

Mittal was born on 23 December 1971 in Mumbai to Bhagwati Devi Mittal and Gopal Krishna Mittal. In 2013, Mittal married his long-term girlfriend, model Aanchal Kumar, in Jaipur. They have a daughter, Alyssa Mittal.

== Awards and recognitions ==
- 2011, Mittal received the award for the most innovative company in India by Fast Company, a US Business Publication.
- Mittal received Karmaveer Chakra Award in the category of Entrepreneurs for Social Change.
- Mittal was listed by Business Standard as the top angel investor in 2014 and 2015 for investing in 25 and 34 start-ups respectively.
- In 2016, Mittal was listed under The 8 Most Prominent Angel Investors in India by Forbes
- In 2020, he got an award as Outstanding Serial Entrepreneur and Angel Investor by the TiE.
- He has also ranked in list of 50 Most Powerful People in India by a business weekly, The Week.
