= Chiratae Ventures =

Indian venture capital firm

- Type: Private company
- Industry: Private equity, Venture Capital
- Founded: 2006
- Founders: Sudhir Sethi, TCM Sundaram
- Headquarters: Bangalore, India
- Products: Venture capital
- AUM: $1.28 billion (2024)
- Website: www.chiratae.com

Chiratae Ventures, is a technology venture capital firm focused on growth-stage startups in the Indian market. The venture firm was founded by Sudhir Sethi and T. C. M. Sundaram as the Indian arm of the global venture capital firm IDG Ventures in 2006. The firm manages total assets of over $775 million in over 85 investee companies. It is headquartered in Bangalore, with offices in Mumbai and New Delhi.

== Investments ==
In additional to individual investors, the firm's funds raise capital from its limited partner, Small Industries Development Bank of India (SIDBI). Some of the firm's investments include startups such as Myntra, Healthifyme, Lenskart, CureFit, CultFit, PolicyBazaar, HexaHealth, FirstCry, and Bounce.

On August 21, 2020, it was announced that CDC Group, a UK Government owned development finance institution had committed $10 million in Chiratae ventures' Fund IV, which focuses on early stage technology enabled Indian startups.

In August 2021, Charatae Ventures announced the final close of its fourth fund at $337 million, marking its largest investment fund till date since inception in 2006.
