= Namita Thapar =

Indian entrepreneur (born 1977)

- Born: Namita Mehta; 21 March 1977 (age 49); Pune, Maharashtra, India
- Education: Fuqua School of Business, Brihan Maharashtra College of Commerce
- Occupations: Businessperson; Entrepreneur; angel investor
- Years active: 1996–present
- Organization: Emcure Pharmaceuticals
- Television: Shark Tank India (2021–present)
- Spouse: Vikas Thapar (m. 2003)
- Children: Vir Thapar; Jai Thapar
- Parents: Satish Mehta (father); Bhavana Mehta (mother)
- Relatives: Samit Mehta (brother)

Namita Thapar (née Mehta; born 21 March 1977) is an Indian entrepreneur, business executive, and angel investor. She is the Executive director of Emcure Pharmaceuticals. She has also been an investor in Shark Tank India investing in over 100 companies. She is also the founder of Thapar Entrepreneur Academy.

== Early life and education ==
Namita is the daughter of businessman Satish Ramanlal Mehta. She completed her MBA from Duke University's Fuqua School of Business in 2001 and is a Chartered Accountant from ICAI.

== Career ==
After completing her MBA, she ventured to the US, to take the role of Business Finance head at Guidant Corporation. Later, she relocated to India, where she took the role of CFO at Emcure Pharmaceuticals.

== Television ==
Thapar has been an angel investor "Shark" on the Sony Entertainment Television's reality program Shark Tank India in seasons 1, 2, 3, 4 and 5

== Personal life ==
She is married to Vikas Thapar, and they have two sons, Jai and Vir.

== Awards ==
- In 2018, she won Economic Times ‘40 under Forty’ Award.
