= Makaan.com =

Indian online real estate portal

- Company type: Real estate
- Available in: English
- Headquarters: Gurgaon, India
- Founders: Anupam Mittal, Aditya Verma
- CEO: Dhruv Agarwala
- Industry: Real Estate
- Website: www.makaan.com
- Launched: 2007; 19 years ago

Makaan.com is an online real estate portal in India, launched in 2007. It has a rating system for brokers.

== History ==
Makaan.com was a part of the Anupam Mittal-promoted People Group. The group owned Shaadi.com and Mauj.

== Promoters ==
In April 2015, PropTiger.com, an independent online real estate advisor, took over Makaan.com. Makaan.com is now a part of Elara Technologies Private Ltd., Singapore, which is also the company that owns PropTiger.com. Elara Technologies PVT Limited is a digital real estate marketing and transaction service provider. SAIF Partners, Accel Partners, and Horizons Ventures are some of the major investors in Elara. Rupert Murdoch's News Corp., a global media, book publishing, and digital real estate services company, took a 25% stake in Elara in November 2014.
