= Heritage Pharmaceuticals =

Pharmaceuticals manufacturer in New Jersey

Heritage Pharmaceuticals Inc. is a manufacturer of generic pharmaceuticals based in Eatontown, New Jersey, United States, and established in 2006.

The company was involved in a 2014 congressional inquiry about the rising price of doxycycline hyclate initiated by Elijah Cummings and Bernie Sanders.

In December 2016, it was accused of conspiracy to raise the price of the antibiotic doxycycline and diabetes drug glyburide in 20 US states after investigations by Connecticut's Attorney General. Mylan, Teva Pharmaceuticals USA Citron Pharma, India's Aurobindo Pharma and Australia's Mayne Pharma are alleged to be part of the conspiracy. In June 2019, Heritage entered into a deferred prosecution agreement with the United States Department of Justice, Antitrust Division ("DOJ") relating to a one-count Information for a pricing conspiracy involving glyburide. In conjunction with the DPA, Heritage agreed to pay a $225,000 fine. The DPA expired on May 30, 2022, and the United States District Court for the Eastern District of Pennsylvania dismissed with prejudice the one-count Information filed by the DOJ against Heritage on June 30, 2022.

The US Department of Justice also brought criminal charges against former Chief Executive Officer Jeffrey Glazer and former Vice President of Commercial Operations Jason Malek for price fixing. The company fired them in August 2016 and brought civil proceedings against them, alleging that they stole tens of millions of dollars from the company over at least seven years using at least five dummy corporations to siphon off Heritage's profits through numerous racketeering schemes, including $466,000 in profit in one day. It is alleged that the price of 500 doxycycline tablets rose in the US from $20 to $1,849 in just seven months.

On October 31, 2024, Heritage Pharmaceuticals and Apotex agreed to pay $49.1 million to resolve allegations of price-fixing in collusion to artificially raise drug prices as charged by a coalition of 50 state attorneys general.

== See also ==
- Biotech and pharmaceutical companies in the New York metropolitan area
