= DesmondJi =

Distilled spirit, liqueur and cocktail blend

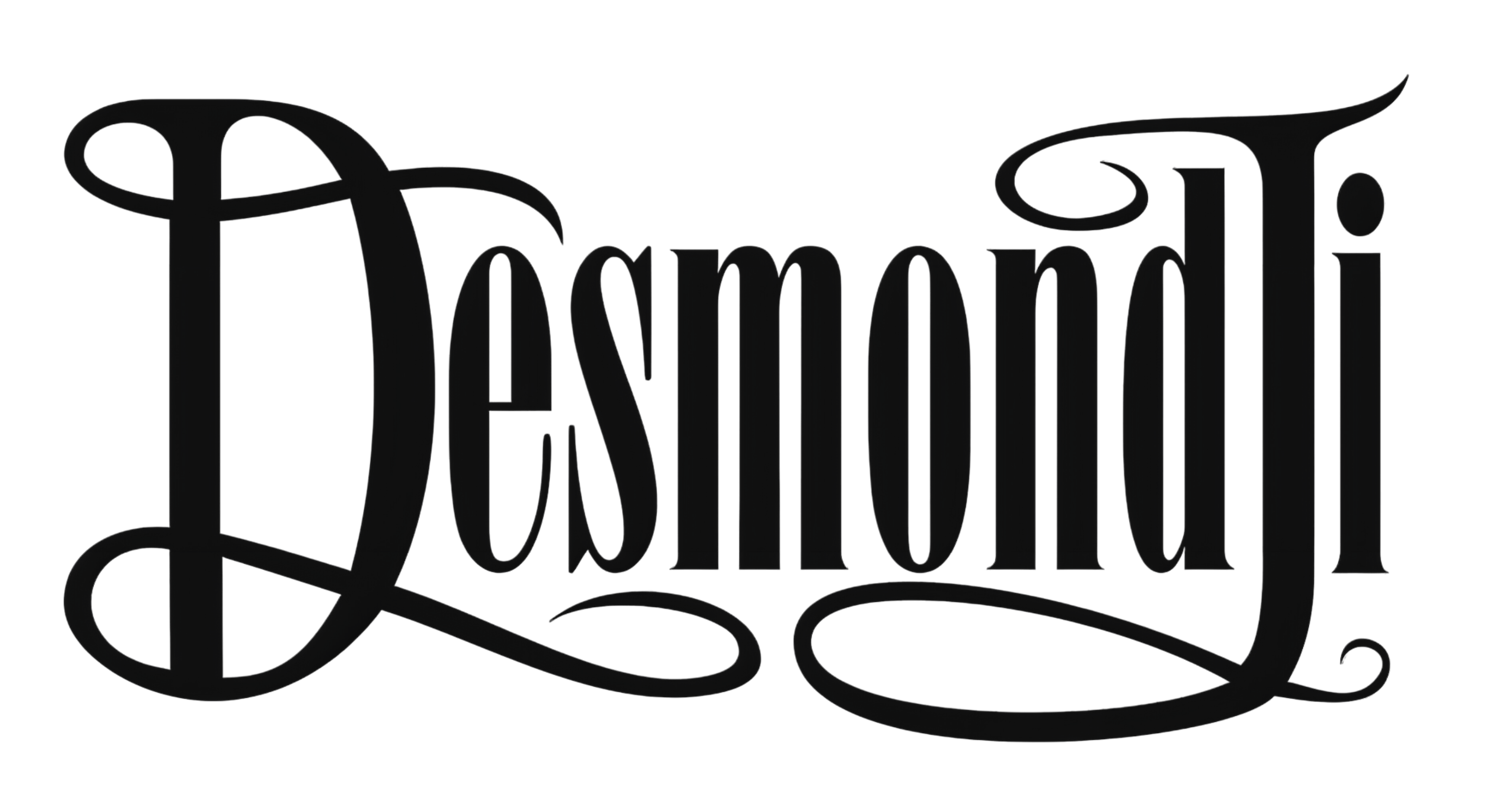
- Type: Alcoholic beverage
- Manufacturer: Agave Industries (India) Private Limited
- Introduced: 2011
- Alcohol by volume: 40%
- Website: desmondji.com

DesmondJi is a brand of alcoholic beverages manufactured by Agave India, founded by Desmond Nazareth.

It provides Indian agave spirits, artisanal sugarcane spirit, mahua spirit and mahua liqueur as well as orange liqueurs.

DesmondJi launched India's first agave-based liquor in April 2011, in Goa. It is made from semi-wild agave growing on India's Deccan Plateau and produced at Agave India's micro-distillery that's located in the Chittoor district (present day Annamayya district) of Andhra Pradesh.

Pure Cane, made from sugarcane was released in 2013 and was the second category of spirits launched by DesmondJi.

In 2018 DesmondJi launched mahua spirit and mahua liqueur made from the flowers of the mahua tree, that were sourced from the central Indian forest belt.

== History ==
In the 1980s Desmond Nazareth, an alum of IIT Madras, went to America to study filmmaking at Temple University, Philadelphia. During this time he began making cocktails for friends and family. The Margarita was an indispensable part of his repertoire. When Desmond moved back to Mumbai, India, in the year 2000, he found that the main ingredient of the Margarita, Tequila, was both difficult and expensive to procure.

Wondering why Tequila, which is made from the agave plant, was only made in Mexico, but almost all equally well known alcoholic beverages have multiple producers in multiple countries; this is true for Whisky, Brandy, Rum, Gin, Vodka, Beer and Wine, Desmond set about researching the plant and the conditions for its growth. On remembering having seen the plant somewhere in India during his childhood, Nazareth compared the agave-growing regions in Mexico to India and found a match in the Deccan Plateau, where he finally located the plant.

In 2007, Desmond started Agave India, a craft distillery that uses Indian know-how and raw materials, and launched the brand DesmondJi in 2011.
