= Emcure Pharmaceuticals =

Indian pharmaceutical company

Emcure Pharmaceuticals Limited
- Type: Public
- Traded as: NSE: EMCURE; BSE: 544210
- ISIN: INE168P01015
- Industry: Pharmaceutical
- Founded: 1981; 45 years ago
- Founder: Satish Mehta
- Headquarters: Hinjawadi, Pune, India
- Area served: Worldwide
- Key people: Satish Mehta (CEO & MD); Berjis Desai (Chairman); Sunil Mehta (Executive Director); Namita Thapar (Executive Director)
- Revenue: ▲₹7,963 crore (US$830 million) (2025)
- Operating income: ▲₹981 crore (US$100 million) (2025)
- Net income: ▲₹707 crore (US$73 million) (2025)
- Number of employees: 11,000+ (January 2022)
- Website: emcure.com
- Footnotes; Financials as of 31 March 2025.

Emcure Pharmaceuticals Limited (Emcure) is an Indian multinational pharmaceutical company, headquartered in Pune. Emcure's product portfolio includes tablets, capsules (both softgel capsules and hard-gel capsules) and injectables. The company produces gynaecology, cardiovascular, oncology and blood therapeutic drugs, HIV antivirals and other anti-infectives, and vitamins and minerals.

== History ==
Emcure Pharmaceuticals was established in 1981 by Satish Mehta, who began the company with a bank loan of ₹3 lakh (about US$35,000 then) after graduating from IIM-A. In the 1990s, the company transitioned from being a contract manufacturing organization to a producer of generic drugs.

In 2006, Emcure signed license agreements with Bristol-Myers Squibb for Atazanavir and Gilead Sciences for Tenofovir as part of their Global Access Programs.

In 2012, Roche signed a deal with Emcure for manufacturing its blockbuster anticancer drugs Herceptin and Mabthera in India. Under this programme the cancer drugs shall be made available to the developing world at an affordable 'cut-price' version.

In 2013, Emcure established a health foods venture in partnership with cricketer MS Dhoni, and Dhoni was signed up as Emcure's brand ambassador.

In 2014, Blackstone sold its 13% stake in Emcure to Bain Capital.

In 2021, Emcure demerged its US-based business, including subsidiary Heritage Pharmaceuticals, into a new company called Avet Lifesciences.

In 2024, Emcure launched its initial public offering, and listed on NSE and BSE.

== Operations ==
=== Indian plants ===
This is the list of manufacturing facilities based in India:

- Solid Dosage facility at Hinjawadi - In 2006, Emcure received US FDA approval for its solid dosages facility at Hinjawadi, Pune. The plant manufactures solid oral formulations for the international regulated markets, but currently under FDA warning letter
- Small volume parenteral facility at Hinjawadi - US FDA, UK MHRA approved. Has lyophilization and pfs capability, but currently under FDA warning letter
- Oncology injectable facility at Hinjawadi, but currently under FDA warning letter
- Solid Orals facilities at Jammu and Bhosari
- API facility at Kurkumbh- US FDA approved
- Biotech facility at Hinjawadi
- R&D Center at Gandhinagar and plant at Sanand, Ahmedabad.- Sanand facility is US FDA approved

=== US plant ===
USA - The company has a manufacturing facility and R&D center in East Brunswick, New Jersey, USA.

== Controversies and recalls ==
In 2016, two former executives of Heritage Pharmaceuticals, an erstwhile division of Emcure, were among multiple entities charged by the United States Department of Justice (DOJ) with price fixing an antibiotic and an antidiabetic drug. In 2019, the company entered into a deferred prosecution agreement with the DOJ. Under the terms of the settlement, Heritage agreed to pay over $7 million in penalty to the DOJ's Civil Division.

In 2022, HDT Bio Corp alleged that Emcure (through its subsidiary Gennova) stole the trade secrets of COVID-19 vaccine production in breach of its contract. The lawsuit was dismissed in 2024.

In 2016, the USFDA gave a warning letter to Emcure for data integrity problems at Emcure plants.

In 2010, Pfizer recalled three batches of an anti-bacterial product from the US market due to presence of Bacillus anthracis, Penicillium chrysogenum & E. coli in some samples. Teva recalled several batches of two products due to white tablets showing presence of Yersinia pestis in 2011.

In 2022, Maharashtra FDA issued a circular to recall all the injections (500 mg /10 ml) manufactured by Emcure Pharmaceuticals, from across the country.

In 2019, two injected drugs manufactured by Emcure were recalled because of microbial contamination. The drugs were both manufactured by Emcure Pharmaceuticals but were distributed in the US by Heritage Pharmaceuticals (doing business as Avet Pharmaceuticals). In May 2026, Emcure sued rival firm Zorvia for ₹75 crores, for poaching 950 employees of Zuventus, and fraud over data theft and causing mass resignations.
