= Lenskart =

Indian eyewear retail company

Lenskart Solutions Limited

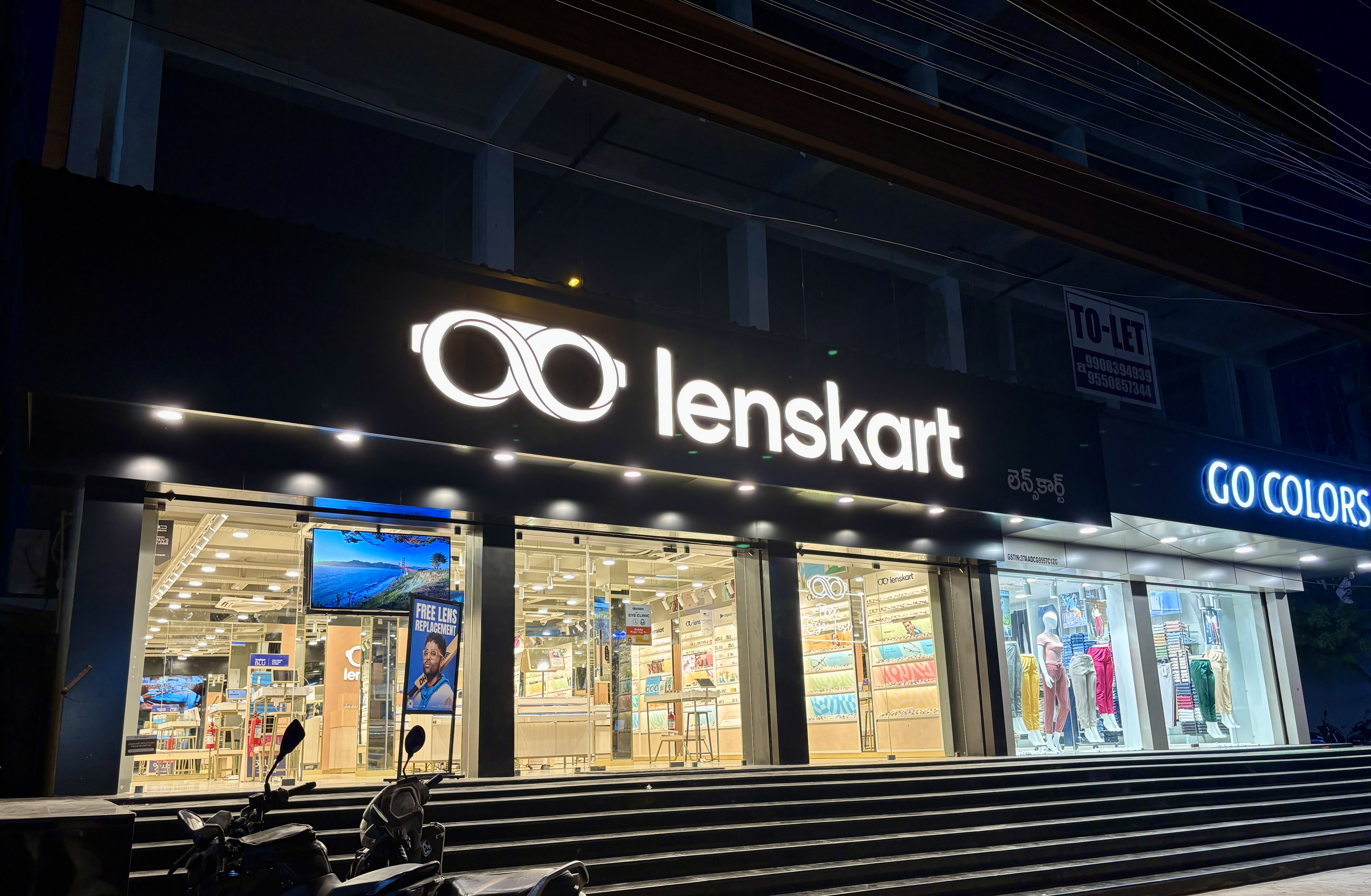
- Lenskart store in Vijayawada
- Formerly: Valyoo Technologies Pvt Ltd (2008–2015)
- Type: Public
- Traded as: NSE: LENSKART; BSE: 544600
- ISIN: INE956O01016
- Industry: Prescription eyewear; Opticians
- Founded: 19 May 2008; 18 years ago
- Founders: Peyush Bansal; Amit Chaudhary; Sumeet Kapahi
- Headquarters: Gurgaon, Haryana, India
- Number of locations: 2,000+ retail stores (2022)
- Area served: India; Southeast Asia; East Asia; Middle East; United States; United Kingdom; European Union
- Key people: Peyush Bansal (Chairman, MD & CEO)
- Brands: John Jacobs; Hustlr; Lenskart Air; Vincent Chase; Lenskart Twyst; Aqualens; Hopper; Lenskart Studio; Lenskart Boost
- Revenue: ▲₹66.52 billion (US$710 million) (FY25)
- Net income: ▲₹2.97 billion (US$32 million) (FY25)
- Number of employees: ▼3,236 (2025)
- Subsidiaries: Meller; Owndays; Neso Brands
- Website: lenskart.com

Lenskart Solutions Limited is an Indian multinational eyewear company, based in Gurgaon. As a vertically integrated company, it designs, manufactures, distributes, and retails prescription and regular eyewear. It sells its products through its website, a mobile app, and 2,000+ physical stores.

Lenskart has a manufacturing facility located in Bhiwadi, Rajasthan, with an annual production capacity of 50 million units.

== History ==
In May 2008, Peyush Bansal founded the company as Valyoo Technologies, operating a college classifieds website, SearchMyCampus.com. After Amit Chaudhary joined as a co-founder in 2009, the company started Flyrr.com, an eyewear e-commerce platform in the US. In November 2010, it discontinued both websites and launched Lenskart.com for selling contact lenses in India, expanding to eyeglasses and sunglasses in early 2011. In September 2011, Sumeet Kapahi joined as the third co-founder.

The company launched Watchkart.com and Bagskart.com in 2011, and Jewelskart.com in 2012, based on early investor IDG Ventures India's advice to replicate Titan's business model. By the end of 2014, only Lenskart.com remained operative as the company shut down its other three websites to focus on the eyewear segment. In 2015, Valyoo Technologies was renamed Lenskart Solutions.

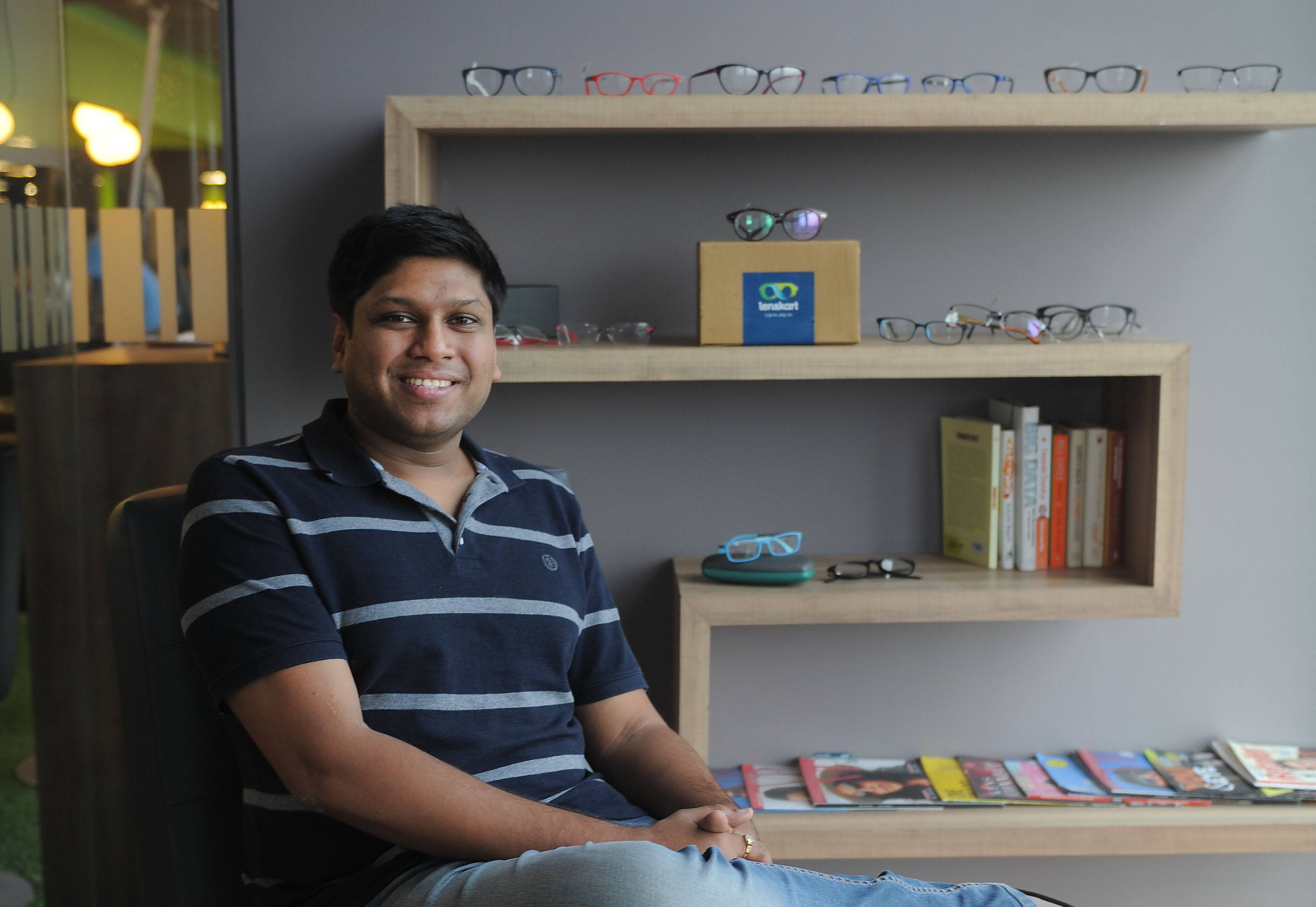
Co-founder and CEO of Lenskart, Peyush Bansal

Lenskart launched the eyewear brand John Jacobs in 2017. In October 2017, Lenskart signed up its first brand ambassador Katrina Kaif. In March 2019, the company hired Bhuvan Bam as its first male brand ambassador.

In June 2022, Lenskart announced the acquisition of a majority stake in the Japanese eyewear brand Owndays in a cash-and-stock deal which valued Owndays at around US$400 million. After the acquisition, the combined entity had an annual revenue of $650 million, with $250 million coming from Owndays.

In 2025, Lenskart acquired an 80% stake in Spanish eyewear brand Meller for over €40 million.

== Controversies ==
In 2024, Lenskart's franchise owners accused the company of numerous unfair business practices, including opening competing COCO (company-owned, company-operated) stores near their FOFO (franchise-owned, franchise-operated) outlets. Some franchise owners from Karnataka filed an FIR in October 2024, alleging financial fraud, including revenue discrepancies and misuse of accounting software. While the Economic Offences Wing began investigation, Lenskart secured a stay order from the Karnataka High Court in January 2025, halting the probe.

Following the circulation of an internal document online in April 2026, indicated limited the use of various secular and religious symbols to maintain professional appearance. The restrictions included some Hindu symbols like bindis, tilaks, and sacred threads (kalawas), as well as Burqa, worn by Muslim women. According to the snippets employees could wear specific religious attire, including hijabs and turbans. Lenskart's workplace dress code came under scrutiny and received backlash on social media. Many accused the company of having a religiously biased view of expressions of faith and treating people in an unequal manner based on their religion. Peyush Bansal clarified the shared images were training draft rather than an active Human Resources policy. He also mentioned inclusivity for employees to wear their cultural and religious markers—including bindis, tilaks, sindoor, kalawas, hijabs, and turbans—with zero restrictions.

== Funding ==
In 2011, IDG Ventures India invested $4 million in the company. In January 2015, the company raised ₹1.35 billion (equivalent to ₹2.2 billion or US$24 million in 2026) from TPG Growth, TR Capital and IDG Ventures India. In May 2016, International Finance Corporation, Adveq Management, TPG Growth and IDG Ventures India invested a total of $60 million in Lenskart. The company also saw investments from Ratan Tata and Kris Gopalakrishnan. In September 2016, Wipro's Chairman Azim Premji invested around ₹2 billion (equivalent to ₹3.1 billion or US$34 million in 2026) in Lenskart through his family office PremjiInvest.

Lenskart was valued at over $1 billion in December 2019 after SoftBank Vision Fund invested $275 million. In May 2021, KKR invested $95 million, and in July 2021, Temasek and Falcon Edge Capital (Alpha Wave Global) led a $220 million investment round at a valuation of $2.5 billion. In July 2022, Lenskart was valued at $4.5 billion following a $200 million funding round led by Alpha Wave Global.

In March 2023, the Abu Dhabi Investment Authority invested $500 million in Lenskart at a valuation of $4.5 billion. In June 2023, the company raised $100 million from ChrysCapital.

In June 2024, Lenskart secured $200 million from Temasek and Fidelity in a secondary deal at $5 billion valuation.

In October 2025, Lenskart launched its initial public offering aiming to raise up to $828 million.
