= Peyush Bansal =

Indian entrepreneur (born 1985)

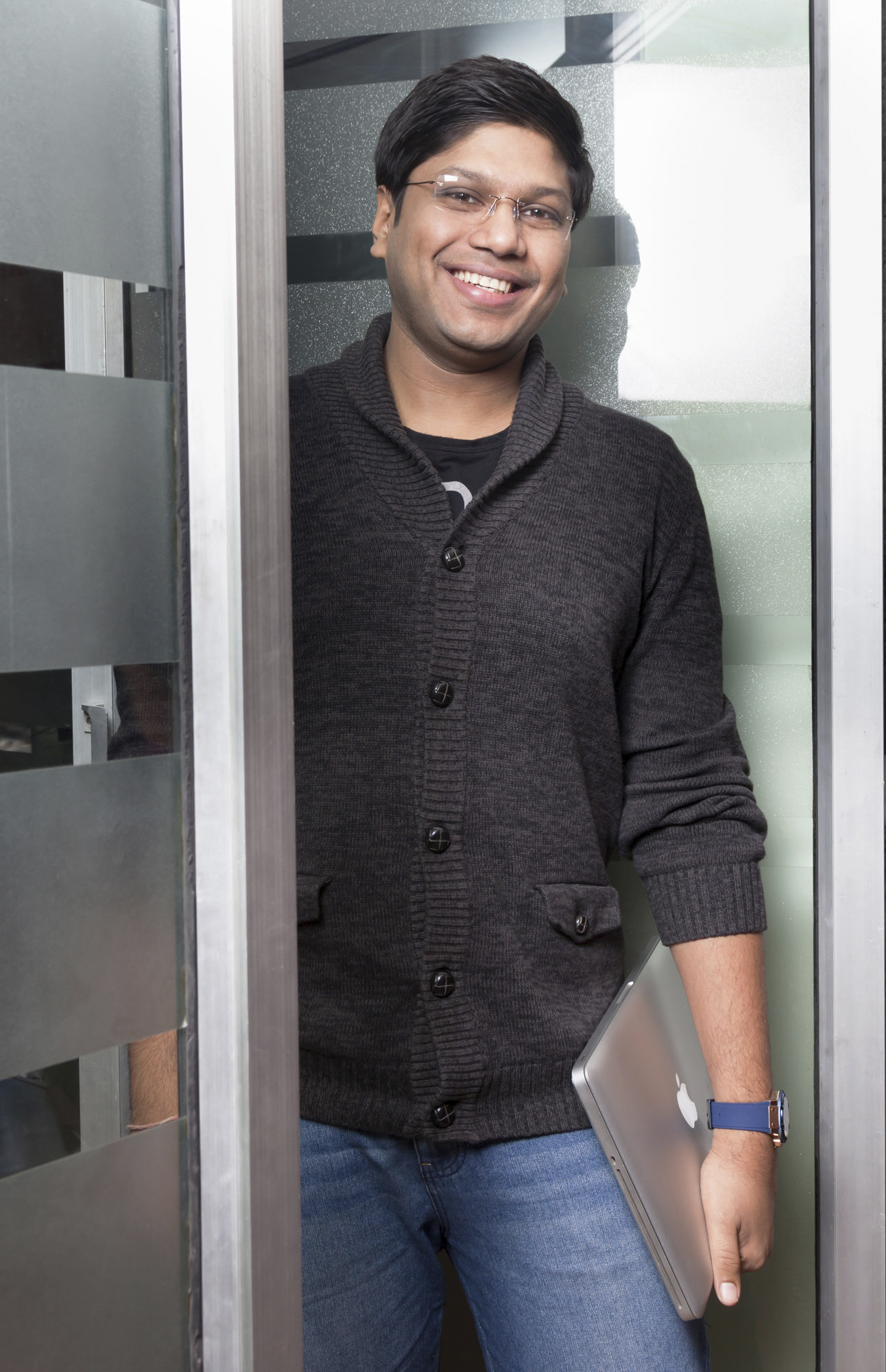
- Bansal in 2013
- Born: 26 April 1985 (age 41); New Delhi, India
- Education: Don Bosco School, New Delhi; McGill University (BEE); IIM-Bangalore (Management Programme for Entrepreneurship and Family Businesses)
- Occupations: Entrepreneur; Businessperson; Investor
- Organization(s): Lenskart (Chairman, MD & CEO)
- Television: Shark Tank India (2021–present)
- Spouse: Nidhi Mittal
- Children: 1

Peyush Bansal (born 26 April 1985) is an Indian entrepreneur, business executive and angel investor. He is the co-founder and CEO of Lenskart, an Indian multinational eyewear retail chain, based in Gurugram. He is also a "shark" in the show Shark Tank India.

== Early life and education ==
He was born into the Hindu Bansal family of Bal Kishan and Kiran Bansal. He went to the United States for a job at Microsoft but later quit to start his own business. Then he started a new venture, selling eyewear online in the USA. He studied at McGill University in Montreal, Canada.

== Career ==
In 2007, he came back to India and started SearchMyCampus.com, a classifieds website for college students. As the website reached 20 employees, in June 2008, he registered a company called Valyoo Technologies in his parents' house in Greater Kailash, Delhi. In 2009, he started another online venture named Flyrr, which was scrapped in November 2010.

In 2010, under Valyoo Technologies, he began an eyewear retail website named Lenskart along with co-founder Amit Chaudhary. In 2011, they were joined by Sumeet Kapahi, who was working for another eyewear brand. After Lenskart, he started three more e-commerce ventures under Valyoo Technologies called WatchKart, JewelsKart and BagsKart, but shut down the latter three to focus on eyewear.

In late 2025, he led Lenskart's IPO, which was a significant event, raising over ₹72 billion (US$750 million) with strong investor demand.

== Controversy ==
In April 2026, Bansal faced backlash over a Lenskart grooming policy that restricted Hindu religious symbols such as bindis and tilaks while permitting other religious attire. The issue sparked widespread criticism on social media, with numerous users and commentators alleging religious bias in the company’s policies.

== Television ==
Bansal is one of the major investors/judges on the business reality show Shark Tank India.

In 2022, Bansal along with the other Shark Tank India judges appeared as a VIP contestant in Kaun Banega Crorepati. He also appeared as a guest on The Kapil Sharma Show together with other Shark Tank India judges.
