= List of Indian entrepreneurs =

This is a list of notable Indian entrepreneurs.

Name	Associated company
Achyuta Samanta	KIIT Group of Institutions
Ajay Piramal, Swati Piramal	Piramal Enterprises Ltd
Anand Mahindra	Mahindra and Mahindra
Prateek Suri	Maser Group
Anil Agarwal	Vedanta Resources
Ardeshir Godrej, Pirojsha Burjorji Godrej, Adi Godrej	Godrej Group
Aroon Purie	Living Media
Azim Premji	Wipro
Baba Kalyani	Bharat Forge
Balkrishna	Patanjali Ayurved
Bhavin Turakhia	Zeta, LogicBoxes
Bhavish Aggarwal	Ola Cabs
Binny Bansal, Sachin Bansal	Flipkart
C. J. George	Geojit Financial Services
Chenraj Roychand	Jain University
Cyrus S. Poonawalla	Serum Institute of India
Deep Kalra	MakeMyTrip
Dilip Shanghvi	Sun Pharmaceutical
Ekta Kapoor	Balaji Telefilms
Faisal Farooqui	MouthShut.com
Falguni Nayar	Nykaa
G. R. Gopinath	Air Deccan
Gautam Adani	Adani Group
Gautam Thapar	Avantha Group
Grandhi Mallikarjuna Rao	GMR Group
Gunupati Venkata Krishna Reddy	GVK Group
Jagdish Chandra Mahindra	Mahindra Group
Jamnalal Bajaj, Rahul Bajaj	Bajaj Group
K. M. Vasudevan Pillai	Mahatma Education Society
Kalanithi Maran	Sun Group
Kallam Anji Reddy	Dr. Reddy's Laboratories
Karsanbhai Patel	Nirma
Kavin Bharti Mittal	hike Messenger
Khwaja Abdul Hamied	Cipla
Kiran Mazumdar-Shaw	Biocon
Kishore Biyani	Future Group
Kochouseph Chittilappilly	V-Guard Industries Ltd
Kumar Mangalam Birla	Aditya Birla Group
Kunwer Sachdev	Su-kam Power Systems
Lakshmi Mittal	ArcelorMittal
Laxmanrao Kirloskar	Kirloskar Group
M. M. Murugappan	Murugappa Group
Mallika Srinivasan	Amalgamations Group
Mangal Lodha	Lodha Group
M. A. Yusuff Ali	LuLu Group International
Moothedath Panjan Ramachandran	Jyothy Laboratories
Mukesh Ambani	Reliance Industries
N. R. Narayana Murthy, N. S. Raghavan, Kris Gopalakrishnan, Nandan Nilekani	Infosys
Narendra Bansal and Keshav Bansal	Intex Technologies
Naveen Jain	Moon Express
Nikhil Kamath	Zerodha
Pradeep Kar	Microland
Prannoy Roy	NDTV
Prathap C. Reddy	Apollo Hospitals
Radhika Aggarwal	ShopClues
Radhakishan Damani	DMart
Ramoji Rao	Ramoji Group
Ratan Tata	Tata Group
Ritesh Agarwal	Oyo Rooms
R. P. Goenka	RPG Group
Rohit Bansal and Kunal Bahl	Snapdeal
Samprada Singh	Alkem Laboratories
Sankaet Pathak	Synapse Financial Technologies and Foundation robotics
Shashi and Ravi Ruia	Essar Group
Shiv Nadar	HCL Technologies
Sridhar Vembu	Zoho Corporation
Subrata Roy	Sahara India Pariwar
Sunil John	Burson Cohn & Wolfe
Sunil Mittal	Bharti Enterprises
Trishneet Arora	TAC Security
V. G. Siddhartha	Café Coffee Day
Venu Srinivasan	TVS Group
Venugopal Dhoot	Videocon
Verghese Kurien	Amul
Vijay Shekhar Sharma	Paytm
Vishal Gondal	Indiagames
Walchand Hirachand	Walchand group
Srichand Hinduja	Hinduja Group
Anil Ambani	Reliance Infrastructure
Harsh Mariwala	Marico
Vijay Mallya	Kingfisher Airlines
Uday Kotak	Kotak Mahindra Bank
