= Bansal =

Surname of Indian Agarwal And Baranwal community

Bansal is a surname of Indian origin. Among the Agrawal and Baranwal communities, it is the name of a gotra (patrilineal clan).

== Notable people ==
People with the surname Bansal include:

- Binny Bansal, businessman and co-founder of Flipkart
- Harmeet Singh Bansal, Indian cricketer
- Jyoti Bansal, co-founder of AppDynamics
- Keshav Bansal, businessman and owner of Gujarat Lions, IPL Team
- Manju Bansal (born 1950), Indian biophysicist
- Narendra Bansal, founder of Intex Technologies
- Naresh Bansal, Member Rajyasabha
- Pawan Kumar Bansal (born 1948), Indian politician
- Pratima Bansal, Canadian economist
- Preeta D. Bansal (born 1965), American lawyer
- Rohit Bansal, businessman and co-founder of Snapdeal
- S. K. Bansal (born 1940), Indian cricket umpire
- Sachin Bansal, businessman and co-founder of Flipkart
- Sanju Bansal, American businessman
- Smita Bansal (born 1977), Indian actress
- Suresh Bansal, member of the 16th Legislative Assembly of Uttar Pradesh of India
- Vinod Kumar Bansal, Indian businessman
- Vishesh Bansal, Indian actor
- Pawan Bansal, Bansal Holidays Rewari
- Peyush Bansal, co founder of Lenskart
