= Sultan Sooud Al-Qassemi =

Emirati educator, art collector, scholar, and columnist

Sheikh Sultan Sooud Al-Qassemi
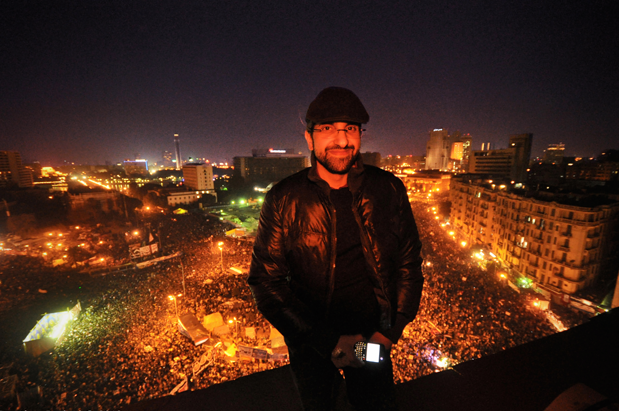
- Sultan on top of Tahrir Square on the first anniversary of the Egyptian Revolution.
- Education: American University of Paris; European Business School
- Occupations: Founder of Barjeel Art Foundation; Founder and Chairman of Barjeel Geojit Securities; MIT Media Lab Director's Fellow; Member of Global Commission on Internet Governance
- Known for: Barjeel Art Foundation
- Website: http://www.barjeelartfoundation.org http://www.sultanalqassemi.com http://www.barjeelgeojit.com

Sheikh Sultan Sooud Al-Qassemi (Arabic: سلطان سعود القاسمي) is an Emirati educator, art collector, scholar, and columnist. Sultan is a member of the ruling Al Qasimi family of Sharjah.

Al-Qassemi is an influential commentator on Arab affairs, and is known for his use of social media—Twitter in particular. He has been described by numerous media outlets as a prominent voice during the events of the Arab Spring.

In 2010, he founded the Barjeel Art Foundation, an organization dedicated to art of North Africa and West Asia based in Sharjah. Al-Qassemi is increasingly regarded as an authority on modern and contemporary art in the region.

In February 2014 Al-Qassemi joined the Global Commission on Internet Governance and in the summer of 2014 became an MIT Media Lab Director's Fellow. He has completed a number of academic fellowships and residencies, including at Yale as a World Fellow, at the Kennedy School's Belfer Center at Harvard University, and others. He has also offered courses on the Politics of Modern Middle Eastern Art as a visiting scholar at universities including NYU, Boston College, Brandeis University, Sciences Po, and Columbia University.

The Gottlieb Duttweiler Institut's Global Influence list of Arabic thought leaders ranked Al-Qassemi number 19 in 2018. Al-Qassemi is also the Chairman of Barjeel Geojit Securities, a joint-venture that was formed with Geojit Financial Services of India.

== Barjeel Art Foundation ==
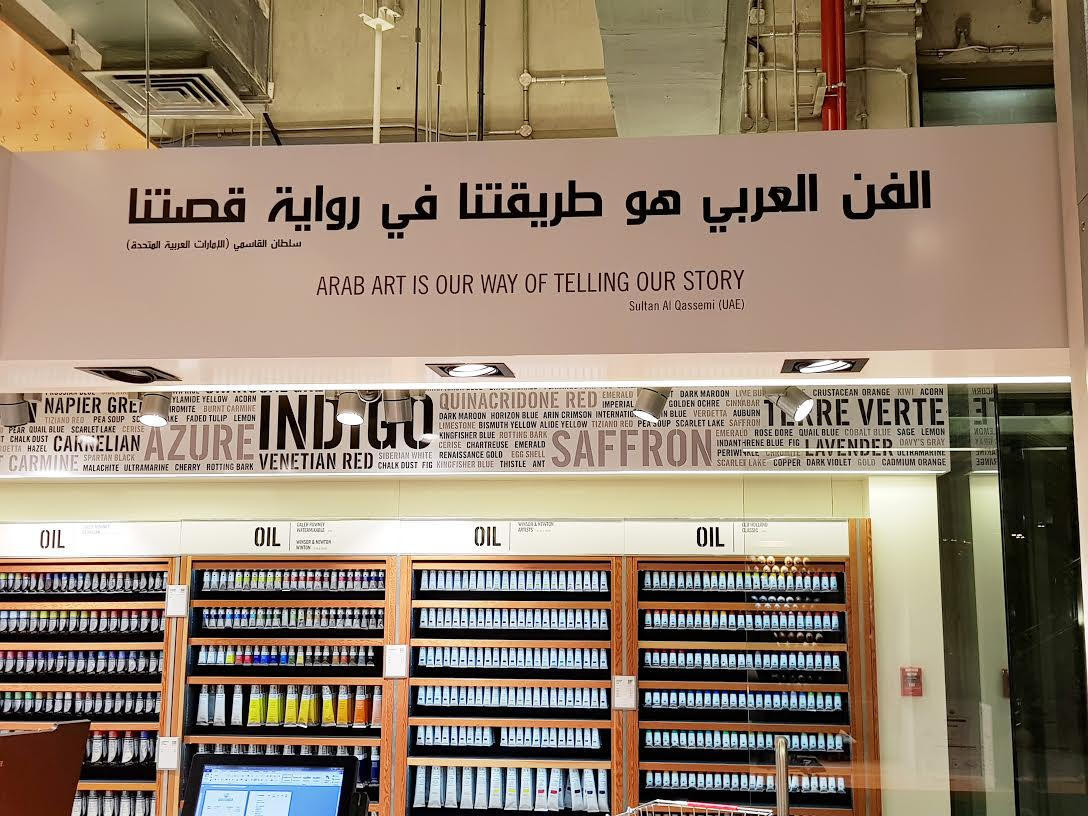
Quote featured at the Fire Station art supplies store, Doha, Qatar. Photo Courtesy of Assil Diab.

Al-Qassemi is the founder of the Sharjah-based Barjeel Art Foundation whose mission is to promote art by artists from the Arab world through exhibitions locally and internationally. He was on the panel of judges on Sheikha Manal's Young Artist Award in 2010, 2011 and 2016. Al-Qassemi was also part of the Jury and Selection Committee of The Christo and Jeanne-Claude Award 2017. In January 2020, Sultan and Barjeel Art Foundation debuted the largest collection of abstract art by Arab artists in "Taking Shape: Abstraction from the Arab World, 1950's-1980's" curated by Suheyla Takesh at NYU Grey Art Gallery. This U.S. traveling exhibition explores mid-20th-century abstract art from North Africa, West Asia, and the Arab diaspora.

== Barjeel Geojit ==
Barjeel Geojit was formed as a joint venture between Al-Qassemi and Geojit Financial Services of India in the year 2000. The company is an eight time consecutive winner of Best Performing Financial Advisor in NRI Category at the CNBC-TV18 Financial Advisor Awards. Al-Qassemi was also featured in the World Economic Forum's list of Young Global Leaders in 2011 as the Chairman of Barjeel Geojit Securities.

== Articles ==
Al-Qassemi's articles have appeared in publications including Foreign Policy, The Guardian, The Independent and CNN. He sparked a debate in the UAE following an article in which he recommended that certain expatriates be granted UAE citizenship. In 2013 Sultan Al Qassemi was criticised for suggesting in an article that continuous civil unrest in parts of the Arab world is leading to the emergence of Persian Gulf cities as cultural and commercial centres of the region.

Al-Qassemi has written about media in the Arab world, the Jewish presence in Middle East, British journalists coverage of Dubai and atheism in the Persian Gulf among other topics. He has also written articles on modern art and aspects of popular culture in West Asia and North Africa. An archive of his articles and interviews appears here.

== Awards and recognitions ==
- #39, Apollo 40 Under 40 Global, Apollo Magazine, 2017
- '140 Best Twitter Feeds', TIME, 2011

== Books ==
- Chapter "The Arab world : a sum of its parts" in "Imperfect chronology: Arab art from the modern to the contemporary: works from the Barjeel Art Foundation", edited by Omar Kholeif with Candy Stobbs, published: Whitechapel Gallery, 2015
- Building Sharjah (Co-edited with Todd Reisz), 2021
- Urban Modernity in the Contemporary Gulf: Obsolescence and Opportunities (Co-edited with Roberto Fabbri), 2022
