= Barjeel Art Foundation =

Organization and museum for Fine Art in the United Arab Emirates

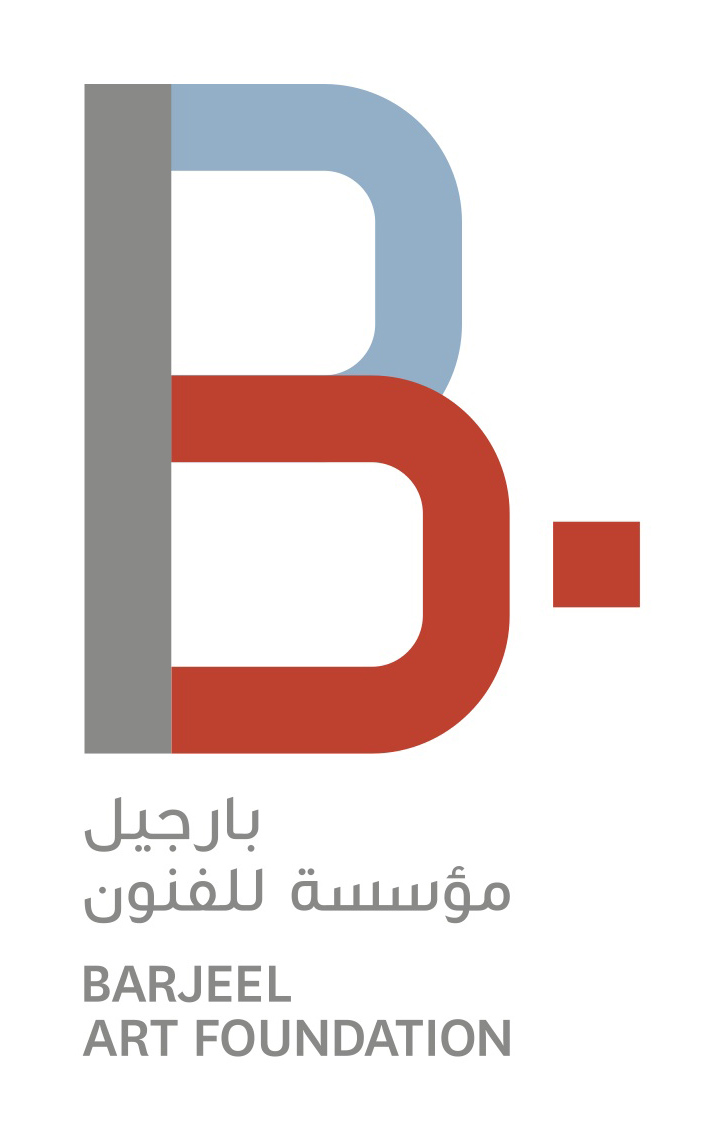
- Established: 2010
- Headquarters: Sharjah, United Arab Emirates
- Curator: Suheyla Takesh
- Founder: Sultan Sooud Al-Qassemi
- Collection: Modern and Contemporary Arab art
- Website: Official Website

Barjeel Art Foundation is a non-profit arts organisation based in Sharjah, United Arab Emirates. The foundation was established in 2010 by Emirati commentator Sultan Sooud Al Qassemi to manage and exhibit his personal art collection. There are over 1,000 pieces of modern and contemporary art in the foundation's art collection. The organisation primarily focuses on artwork produced by Arab artists worldwide and includes paintings, sculptures and installations.

Between 2013 and 2018, the foundation mounted 23 exhibitions in countries including Egypt, UK, Jordan, United States, Kuwait, Singapore, and Iran. In May 2018, a semi-permanent exhibition of the key artworks opened in the Sharjah Art Museum. From 2018 through 2022, the exhibition Taking Shape: Abstraction From the Arab World, 1950s-1980 was hosted at museums and galleries in the states of New York, Massachusetts, Florida, and Illinois in the US.

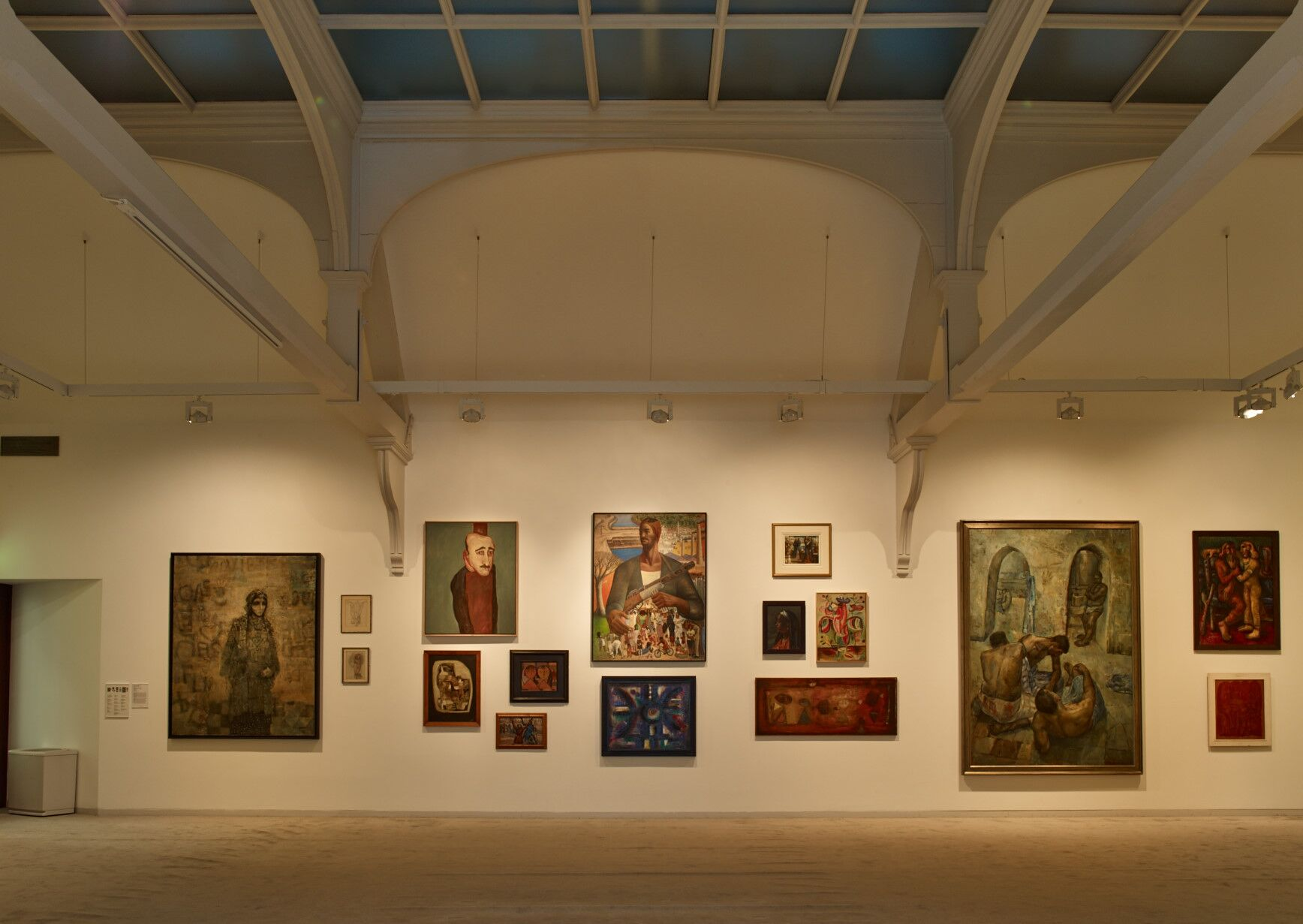
Barjeel's 'Imperfect Chronology' exhibition at the Whitechapel Gallery in London

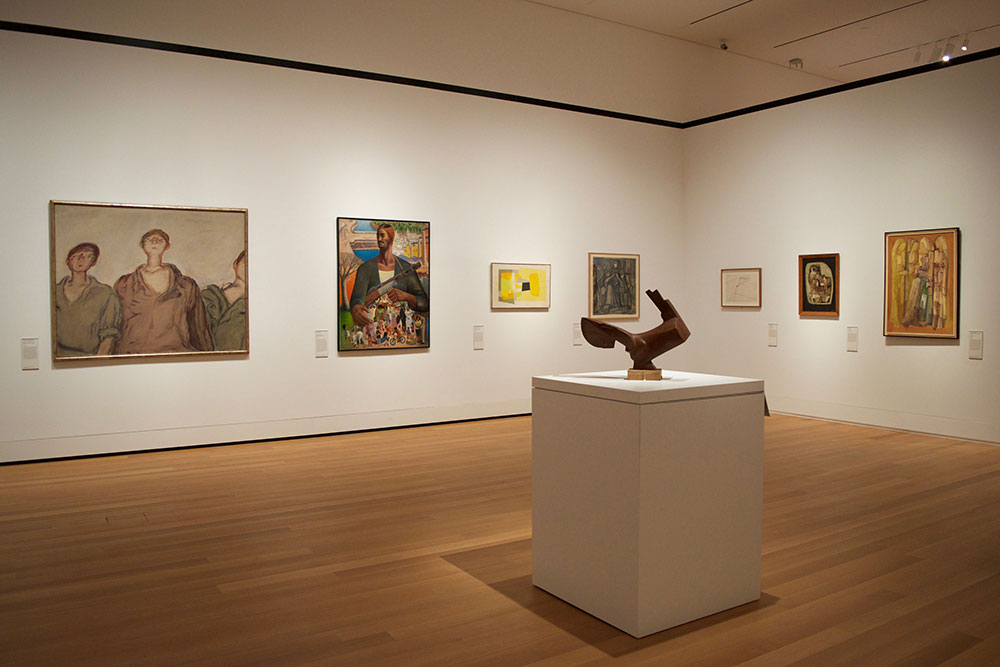
Barjeel's installation at the Yale University Art Gallery

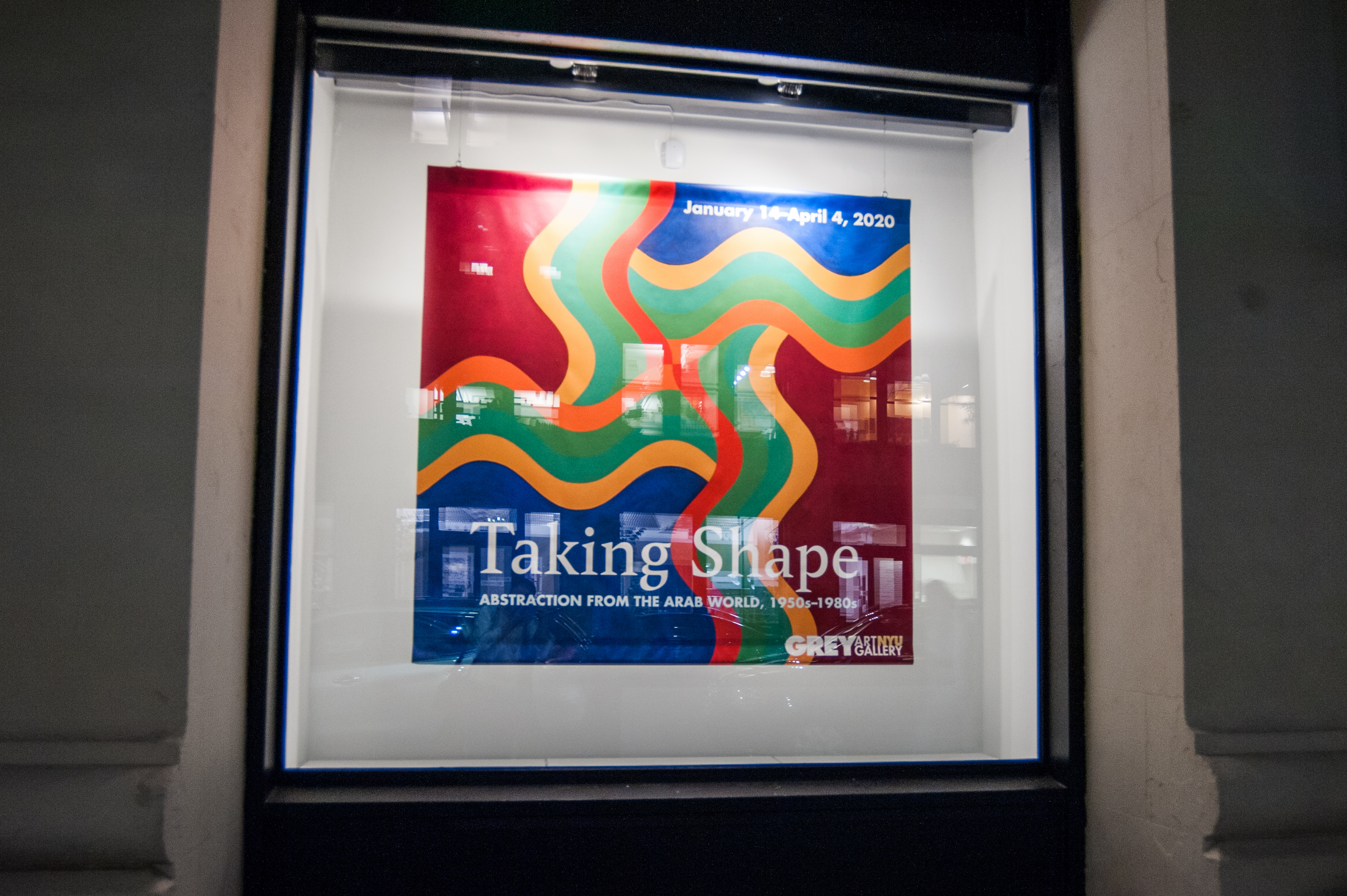
Barjeel's Taking Shape Exhibition at the Grey Art Gallery

== History ==
The etymology of Barjeel is derived from the Arabic word for wind tower. Al-Qassemi started collecting art in 2002 and planned on eventually making the collection available to the public. In 2010, the foundation began exhibiting its collection in an arts space in the Al Qasba district in central Sharjah. In May 2018, the collection moved to a 750 square meter dedicated wing at the Sharjah Art Museum, with the inaugural long-term exhibit A Century in Flux.

== Collaborations and initiatives ==
Barjeel Art Foundation has lent artworks to institutions for exhibition including the Mori Art Museum in Tokyo, the Whitechapel Gallery, in England, Sharjah Museum of Islamic Civilization in the UAE, and Casa Arabe, Cordoba, Spain.

The first external collaboration for the foundation was the 2013 exhibition 'Terms & Conditions' in Singapore. The Singapore Art Museum borrowed half of the art pieces for the exhibition from Barjeel and the other half from the National Museum of the History of Immigration in Paris and the Arab Museum of Modern Art in Doha. In 2015, Barjeel opened the first-ever showcase of political Arab art in North America at the Aga Khan Museum in Toronto. The exhibit, titled 'Home Ground', featured 24 works by 12 different Arab artists, including paintings, sculptures, and photographs.

Since May 2018, the Barjeel Art Foundation collection has been in display at the Sharjah Art Museum through an agreement between the foundation and the Sharjah Museums Authority. The long-term exhibition will last until May 2023 and hosts a selection of modernist paintings and sculptures from the foundation's collection, including works by Saloua Raouda Choucair, Kadhim Hayder, and Dia Azzawi. The exhibition provides access to scholars and researchers to study the art pieces on display.

In January 2020, 75 pieces from Barjeel's modern abstract art collection will go on a 2-year-long touring exhibition in the United States. The exhibition, titled 'Taking Shape: Abstractions from the Arab World 1950s-1980s', will rotate between the Grey Art Gallery and the Johnson Museum of Art in New York, the Block Museum of Art in Illinois, the McMullen Museum of Art in Massachusetts, and the University of Michigan Museum of Art.

The foundation's education initiatives include the Barjeel Global Fellowship with the Museum of Contemporary Art in Chicago. The foundation has organised forums such as Abstraction Unframed: Fourth Annual Conference of the Association for Modern and Contemporary Art of the Arab World, Turkey, and Iran (AMCA). Barjeel has released a series of publications on Arab art and its history.

== Exhibitions ==
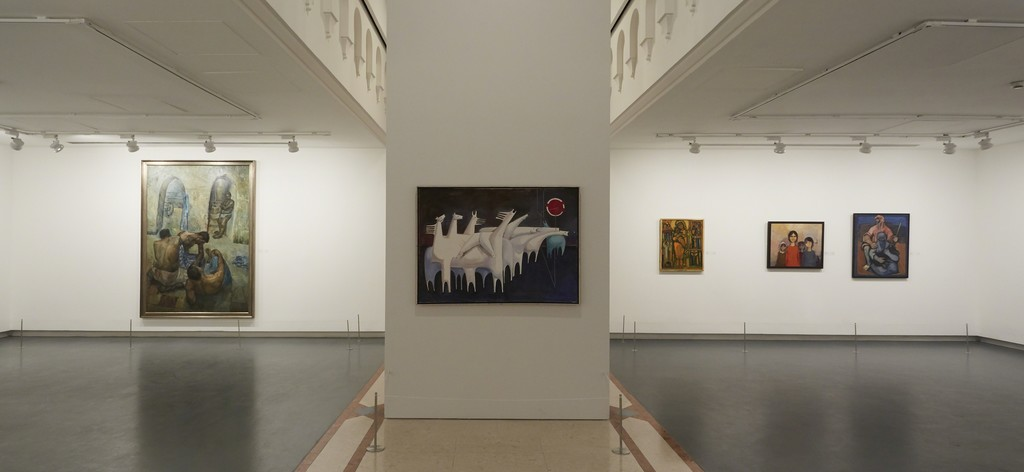
Barjeel Art Foundation exhibition at the Sharjah Art Museum

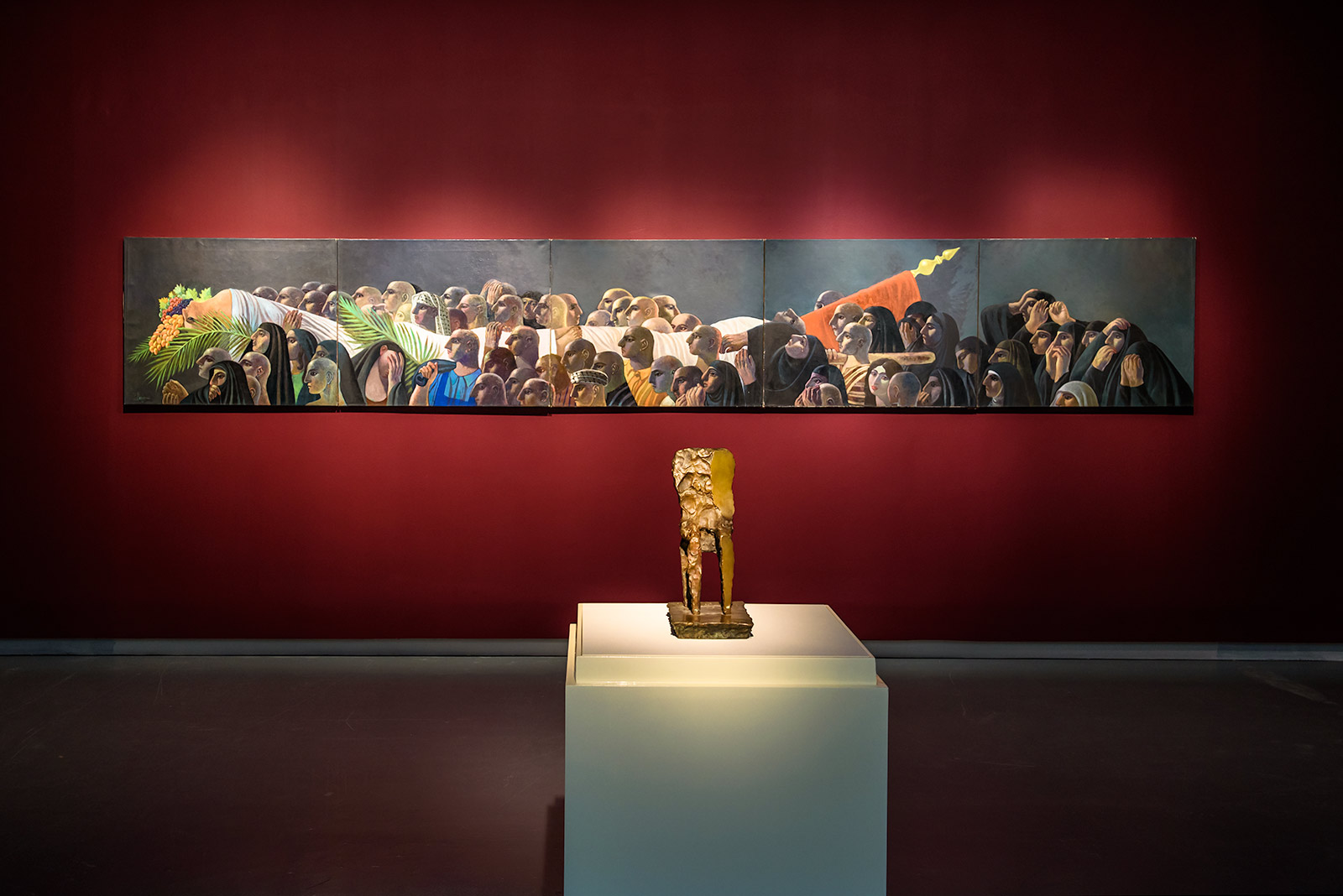
Barjeel's installation at 'The Short Century' exhibition

=== In-house exhibitions ===
Exhibition	Date
Peripheral Vision	14 March – 28 September 2010
Residua	22 October 2010 - 22 February 2011
Strike Oppose	11 March - 28 September 2011
Caravan	14 October 2011 - 22 February 2012
Alienation	24 March - 28 September 2012
Re: Orient	11 March - 22 November 2013
Tarīqah	21 February, - 24 October 2014
Aide-Mémoire	6 December 2014 - 6 February 2015
Footnotes (aide-mémoire part II)	1 March - 1 October 2016
Walls and Margins	21 October 2015 - 1 February 2016
Home Ground	25 February – 1 September 2016
Beloved Bodies	14 October 2016 - 1 February 2017
Night Was Paper and We Were Ink	28 October 2017 - 4 February 2018
Paul Guiragossian: Testimonies of Existence	24 February - 28 April 2018

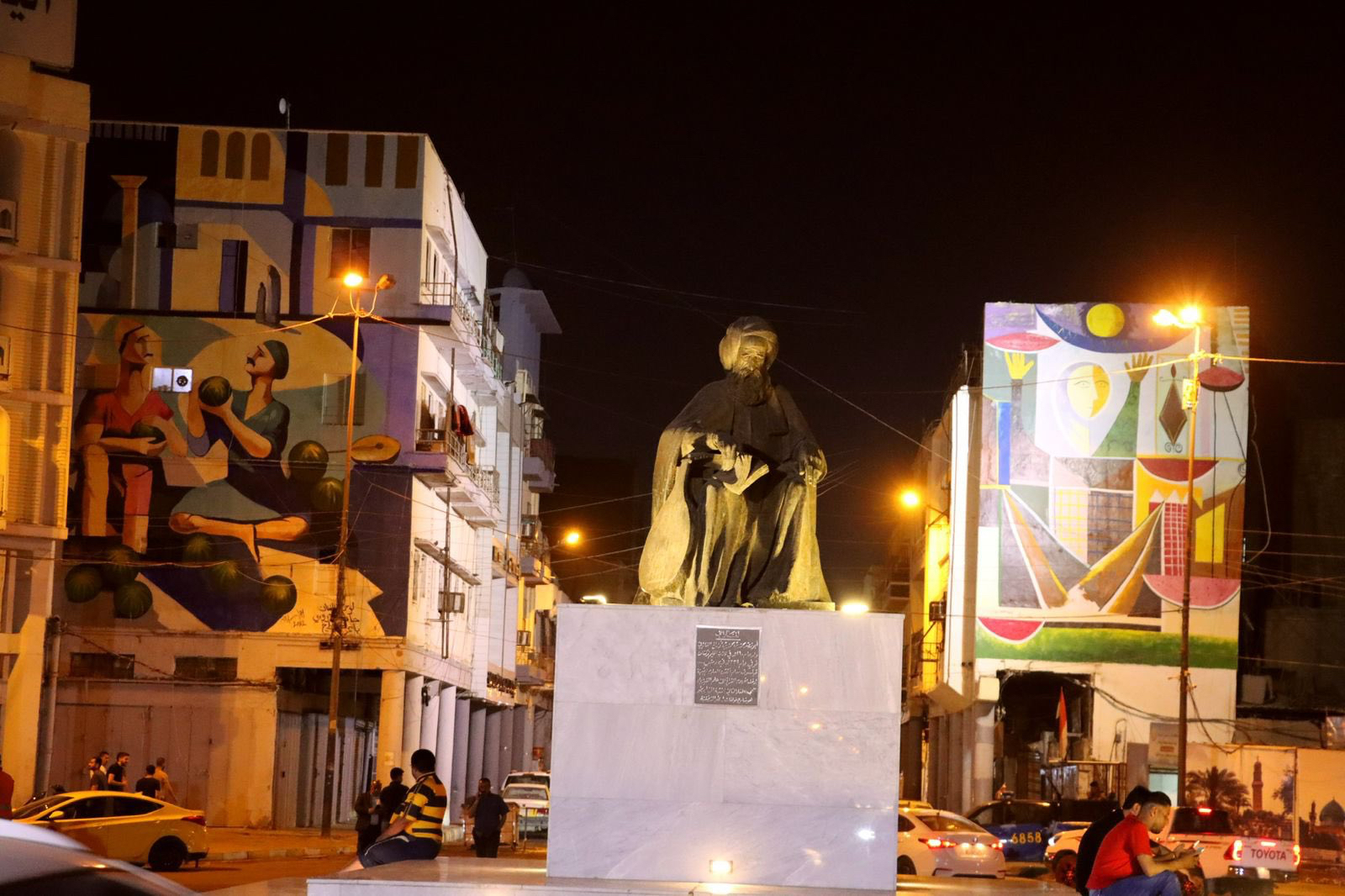
Mural in Baghdad by Iraqi artist Wijdan Al Majid based on Hafidh Droubi's The Watermelon Sellers (1969) from the Barjeel Art collection. Photo by Mayor Alaa Maan.

=== External exhibitions ===
Exhibition	Location	Date
Terms & Conditions	Singapore Art Museum, Singapore	28 June - 28 September 2013
Modes and Methods	Google Arts & Culture	6–7 May 2014
Sky Over the East	Emirates Palace, Abu Dhabi, UAE	29 May – 27 June 2014
Here and Elsewhere	New Museum, New York City, USA	16 July – 12 October 2014
Topographies of the Soul	Maraya Art Centre, Sharjah, UAE	6 December 2014 - 6 February 2015
Al Seef	Contemporary Art Platform, Kuwait City, Kuwait	11 January - 31 March 2015
Home Ground	Aga Khan Museum, Toronto, Canada	15 July 2015 - 3 January 2016
Imperfect Chronology: Arab Art from the Modern to the Contemporary	Whitechapel Gallery, London, England	8 September 2015 - 8 January 2017
The Short Century	Sharjah Art Museum, Sharjah, UAE	23 April - 24 December 2016
The Sea Suspended	Tehran Museum of Contemporary Art, Tehran, Iran	8 November – 23 December 2016
Hurufiyya: Art & Identity	Bibliotheca Alexandrina, Egypt	30 November 2016 - 25 January 2017
Chefs-D'œuvre de L'Art Moderne et Contemporain Arabe	Institut du Monde Arabe, Paris, France	27 February - 25 June 2017
Lines of Subjectivity: Portrait and Landscape Paintings	Jordan National Gallery of Fine Arts, Amman, Jordan	9 March - 31 May 2017
Modern Art From the Middle East	Yale University Art Gallery, New Haven, USA	24 February - 16 July 2017
No to the Invasion: Breakdowns and Side Effects	Hessel Museum, New York, USA	24 June - 29 October 2017
Between Two Rounds of Fire, The Exile of the Sea	Katzen Arts Center, Washington DC, USA	5 September - 17 December 2017
From Across the Distance: Select Video Works by the Barjeel Art Foundation	Burlington City Arts Center, Burlington, VT, USA	13 April - 10 June 2018
A Century in Flux: Highlights From the Barjeel Art Foundation	Sharjah Art Museum, Sharjah, UAE	12 May 2018 - 12 May 2023
Taking Shape: Abstraction From the Arab World, 1950s-1980	Grey Art Gallery, New York City, NY, USA	14 January - 13 March 2020
Taking Shape: Abstraction From the Arab World, 1950s-1980	McMullen Museum of Art, Boston College, Boston, MA, USA	25 January - 6 June 2021
Taking Shape: Abstraction From the Arab World, 1950s-1980	Tampa Museum of Art, Tampa, FL, USA	30 September 2021 - 16 January 2022
Taking Shape: Abstraction From the Arab World, 1950s-1980	Herbert F. Johnson Museum of Art, Cornell University, Ithaca, NY, USA	10 February - 12 June 2022
Taking Shape: Abstraction From the Arab World, 1950s-1980	Mary and Leigh Block Museum of Art, Northwestern University, Evanston, IL, USA	22 September - 4 December 2022
Landscape of Memory: Seven Installations from the Barjeel Art Foundation	McMullen Museum of Art, Boston College, Boston, MA, USA	30 January - 4 June 2023
Kawkaba: Highlights from the Barjeel Art Foundation	Christie's, London, UK	17 July - 24 August 2023
Parallel Histories	Sharjah Art Museum, Sharjah, UAE	20 September 2023 - present

== Gallery ==
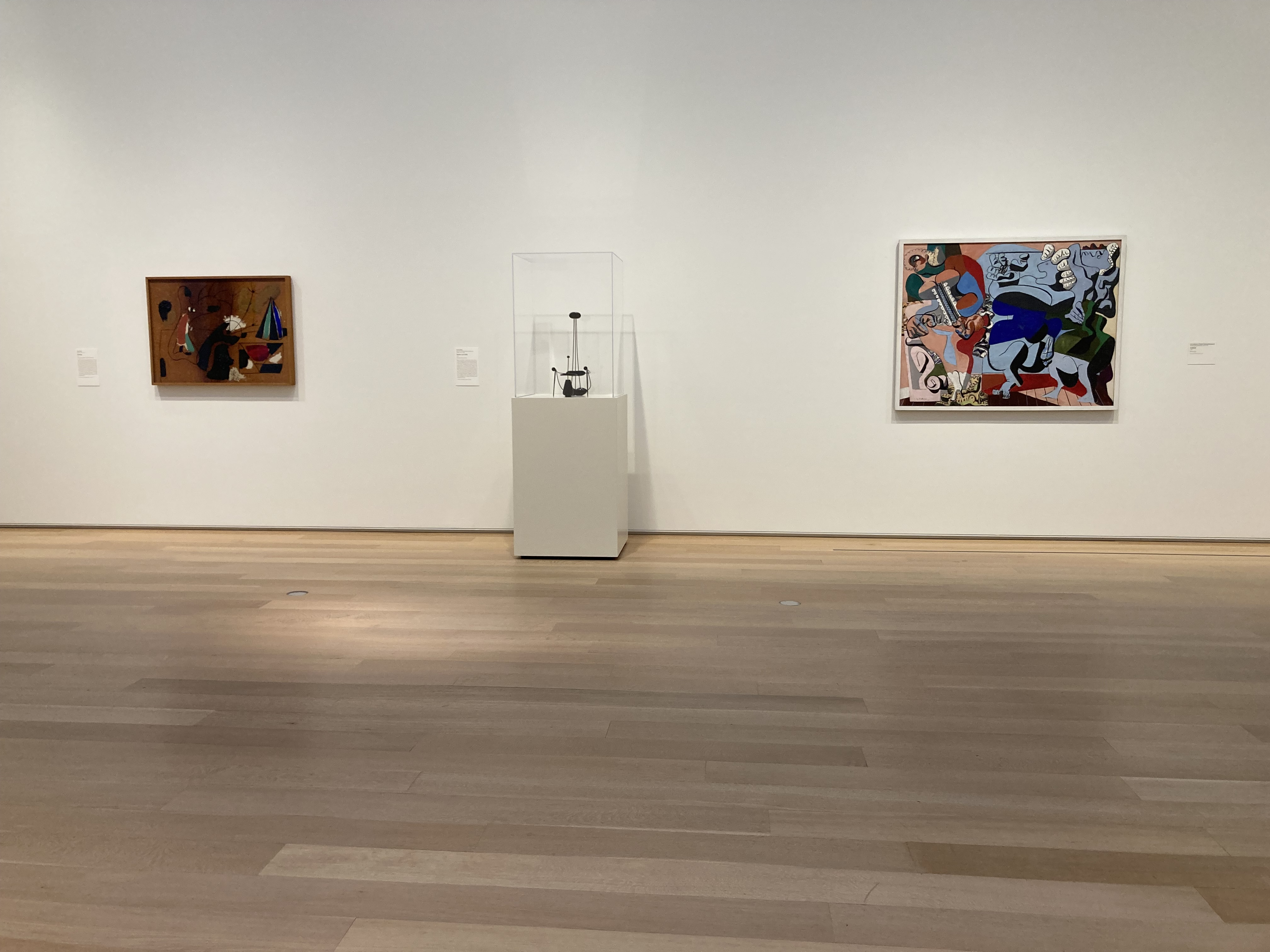
Jewad Selim's Mother and Child sculpture (1953) made from macassar ebony and metal wire in two figurines, on display at the Art Institute of Chicago in Gallery 393. Photo by Matthew S Witkovsky / ARTIC

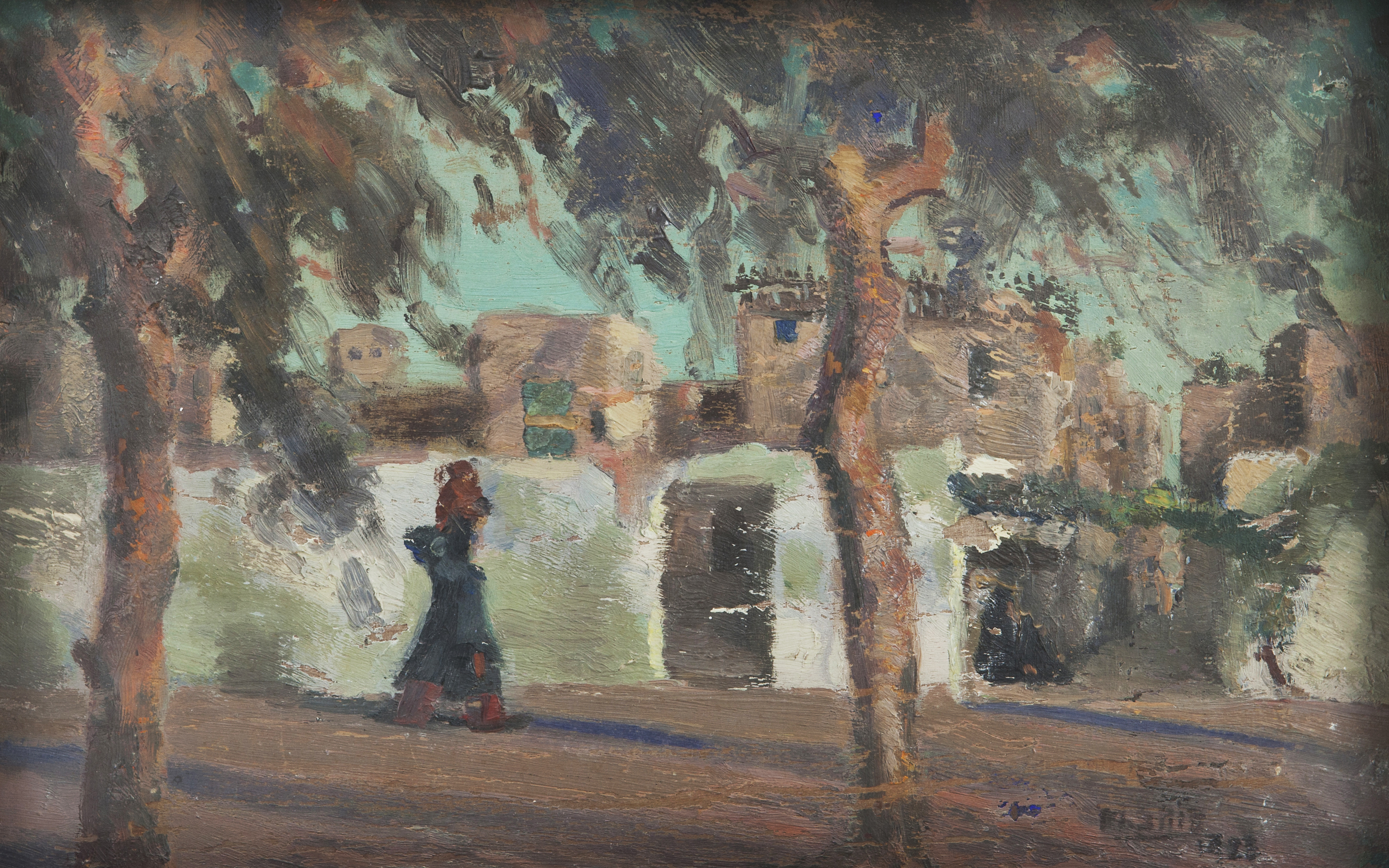
Recto-Village (1923), Mahmoud Sa'id, Egypt

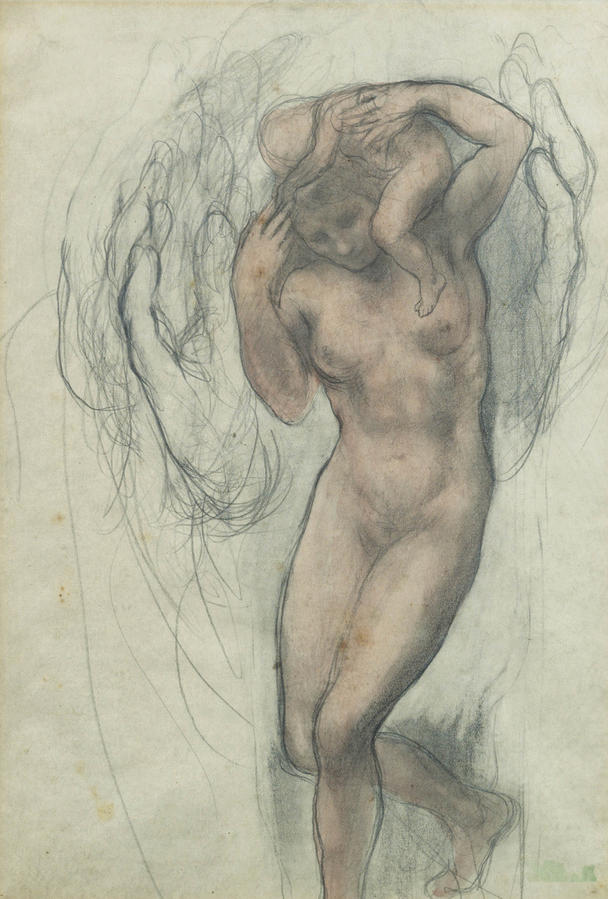
Standing Figure and Child (undated), Khalil Gibran, Lebanon

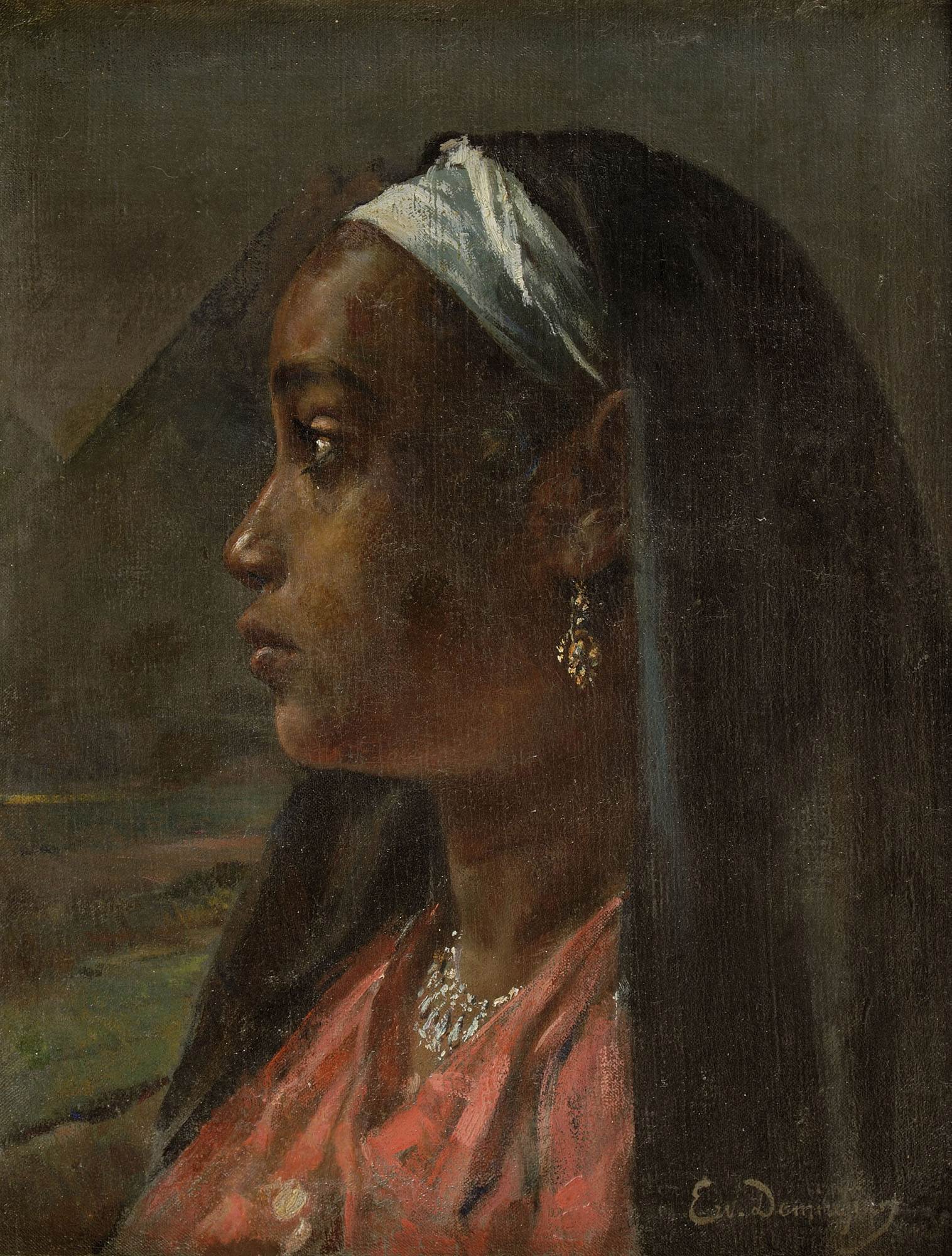
Nubian Girl (undated), Ervand Demerdjian, Egypt

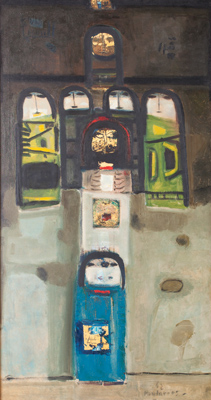
Icons of Moudarres (1962), Fateh Al Moudarres, Syria

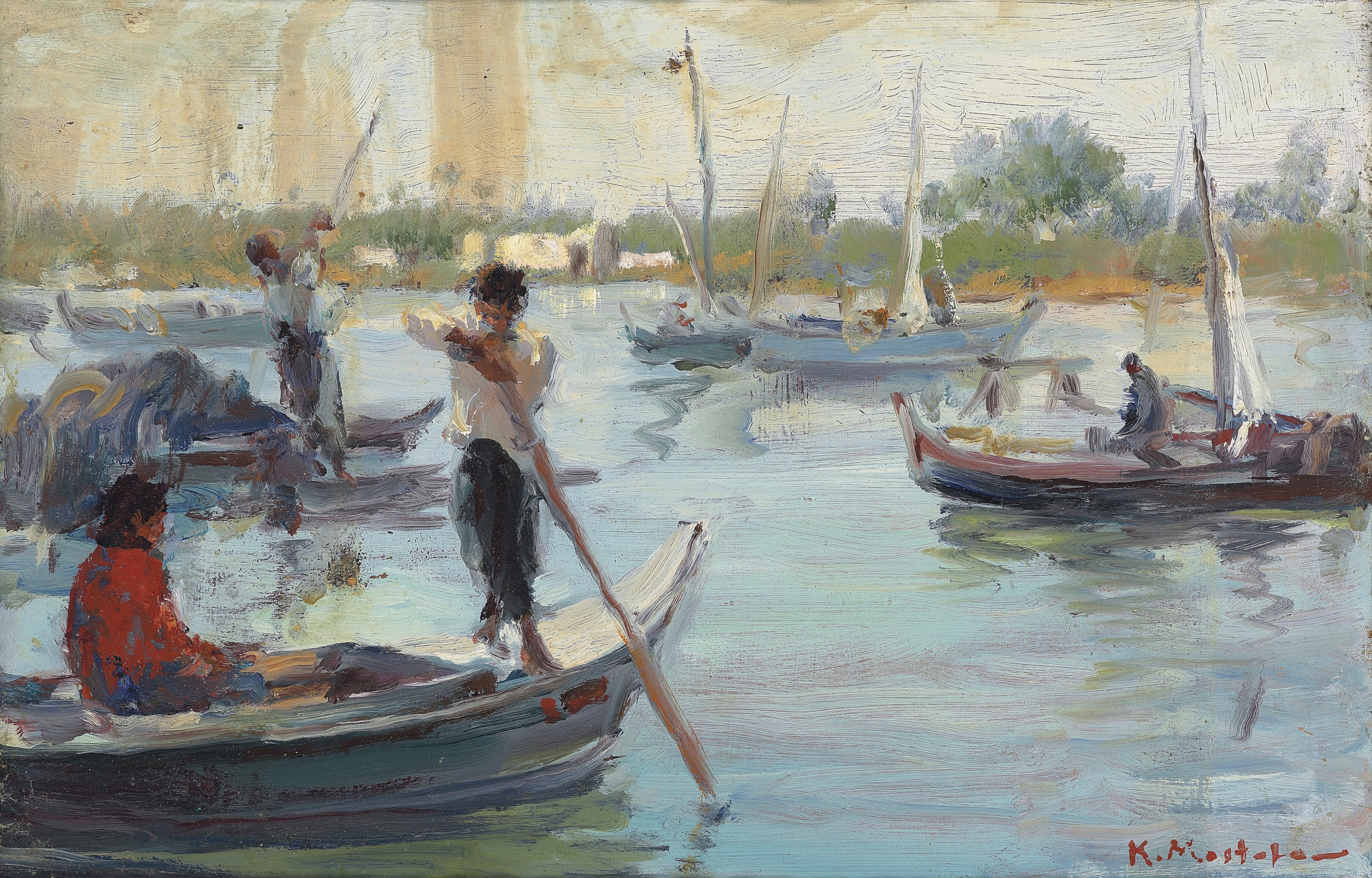
Untitled (undated), Kamel Moustafa, Egypt

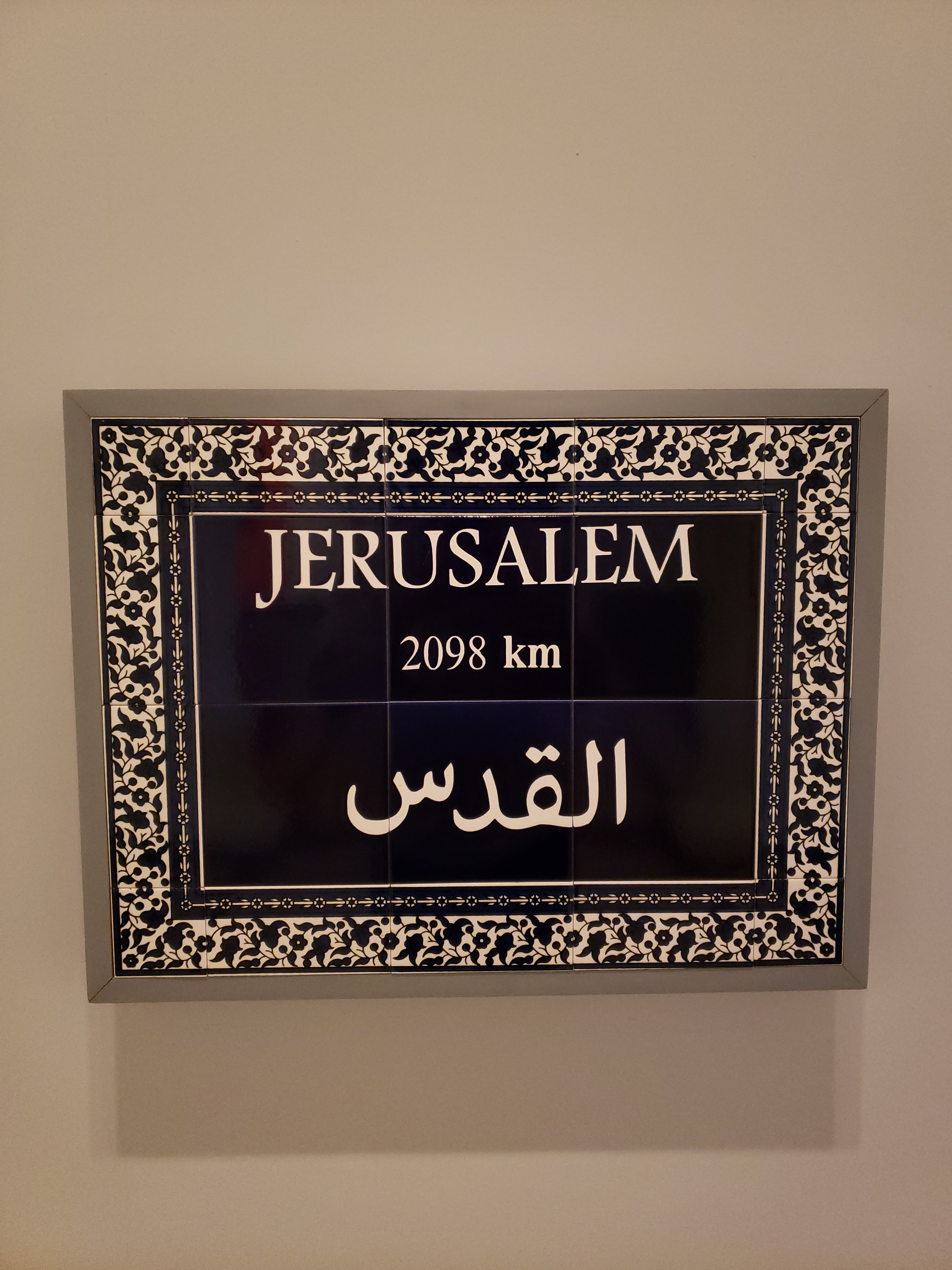
The Road to Jerusalem (2017), Khaled Hourani, Palestine

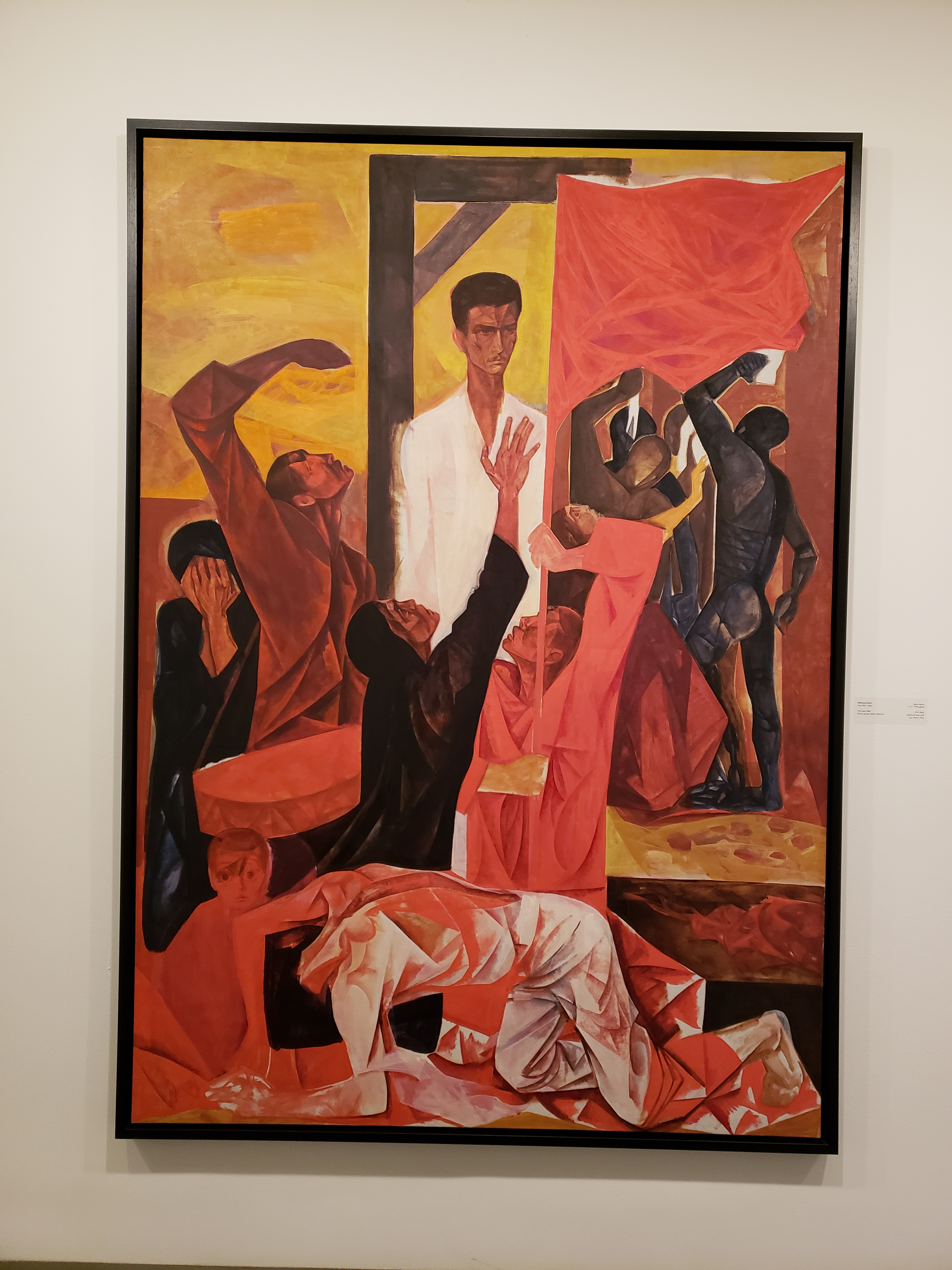
The Hero (1963), Mahmoud Sabri, Iraq

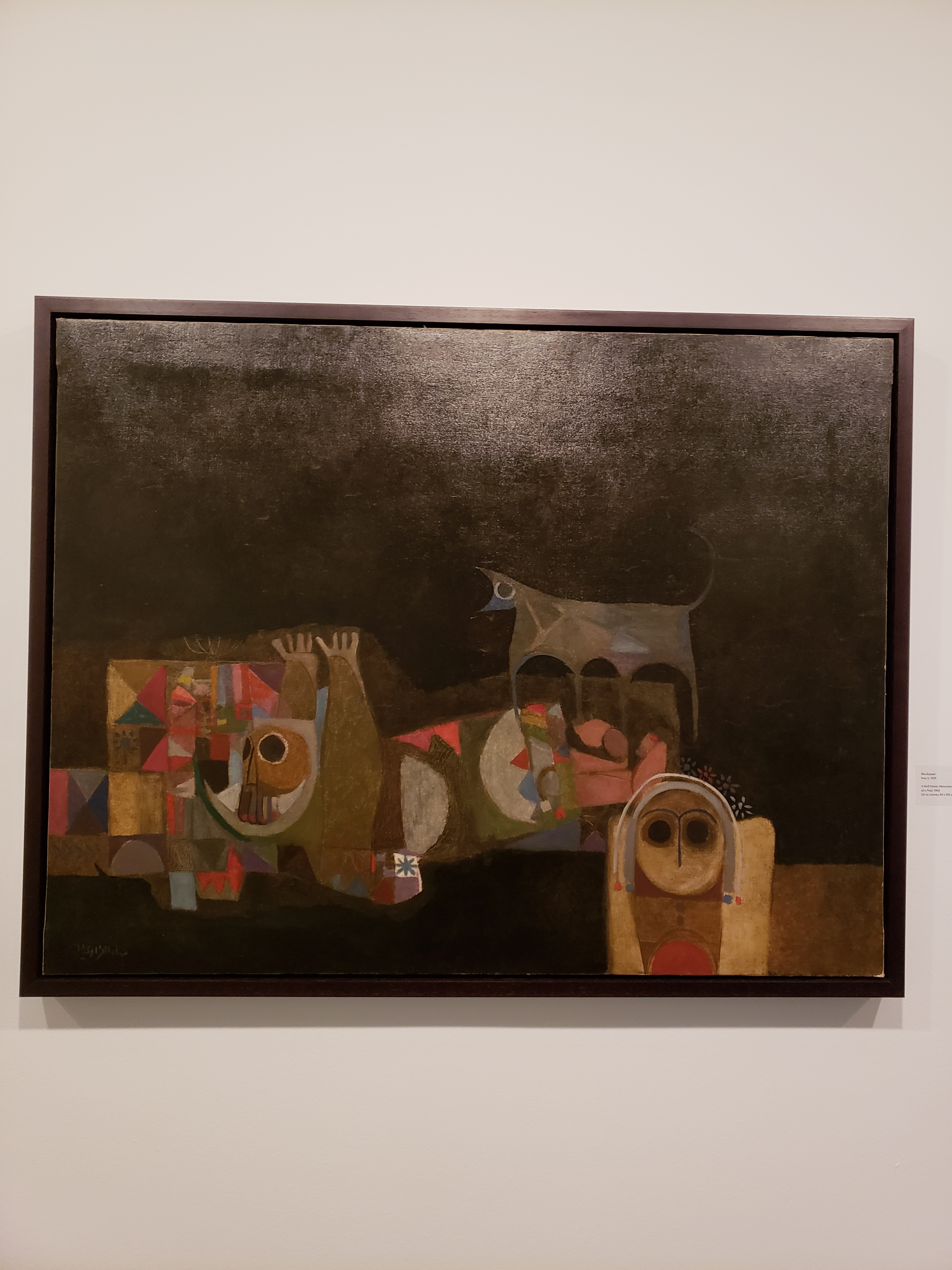
A Wolf Howls: Memories of a Poet (1968), Dia Azzawi, Iraq

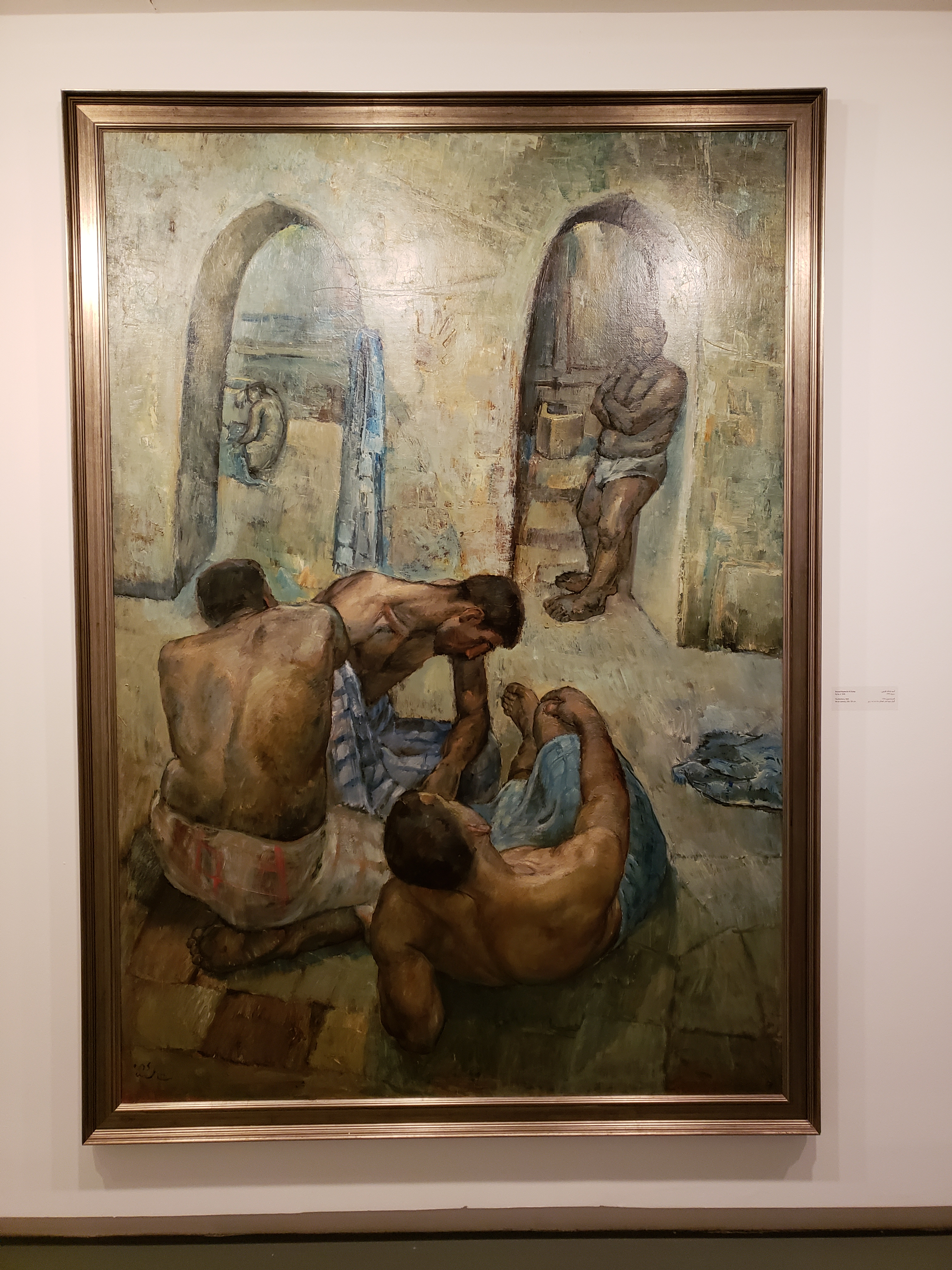
The Bathers (1964), Ahmed Nesha'at Al Zuaby, Syria

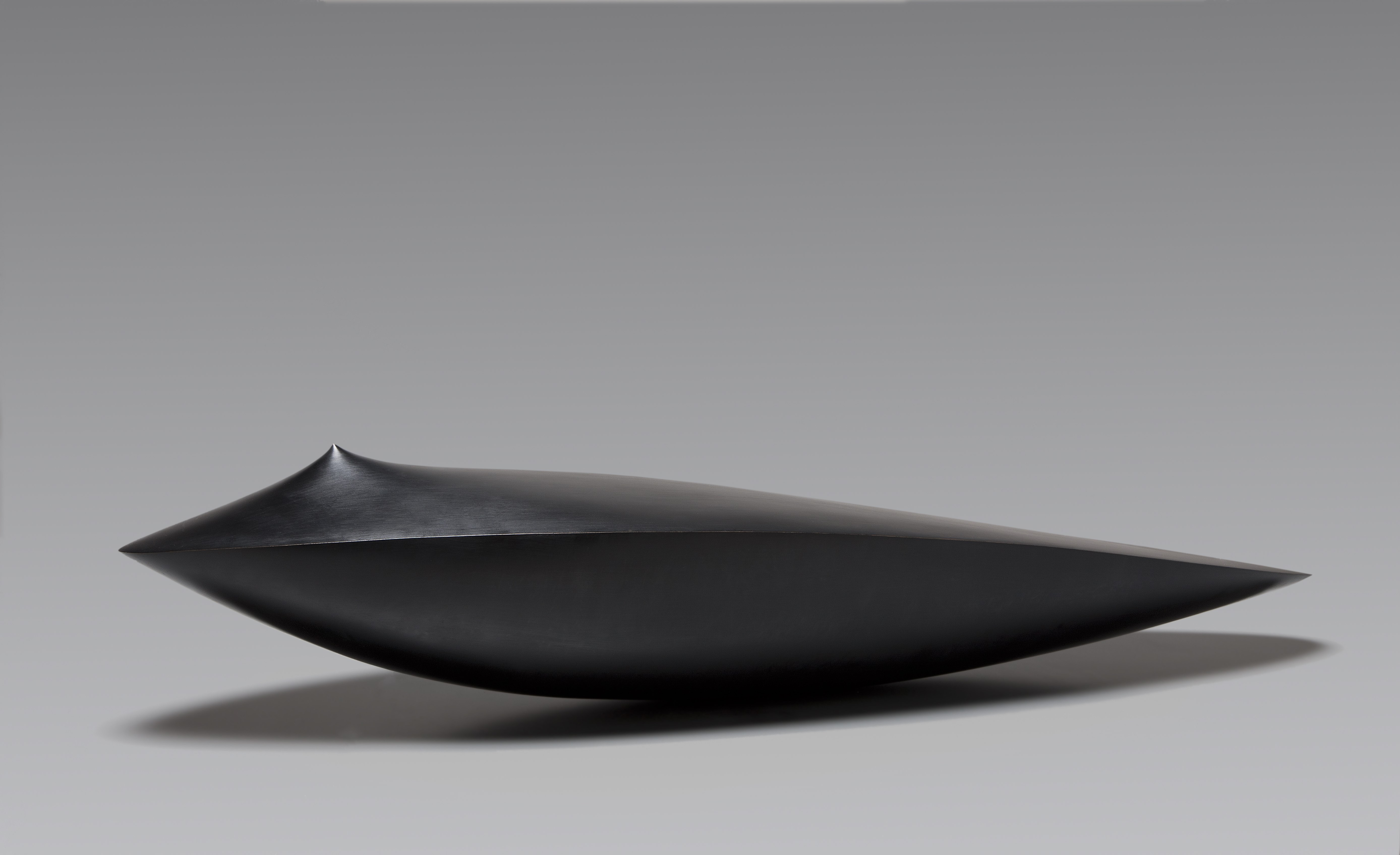
Untitled 105, Armen Agop, Egypt

== See also ==
- Sharjah Art Museum
- Sharjah Museums Authority
- Sultan Sooud Al-Qassemi
