= Mahmoud Sabri =

Iraqi painter (1927–2012)

- Born: 14 July 1927; Baghdad, Iraq
- Died: 13 April 2012 (aged 84); Maidenhead, England
- Resting place: Braywick, Maidenhead
- Known for: Painting, Drawing
- Movement: Quantum Realism

Mahmoud Sabri (Arabic: محمود صبري) (born 14 July 1927 - died 13 April 2012) was an Iraqi painter who was considered to be one of the pioneers of Iraqi modern art and one of the pillars of modernism in Iraqi art.

== Life and career ==
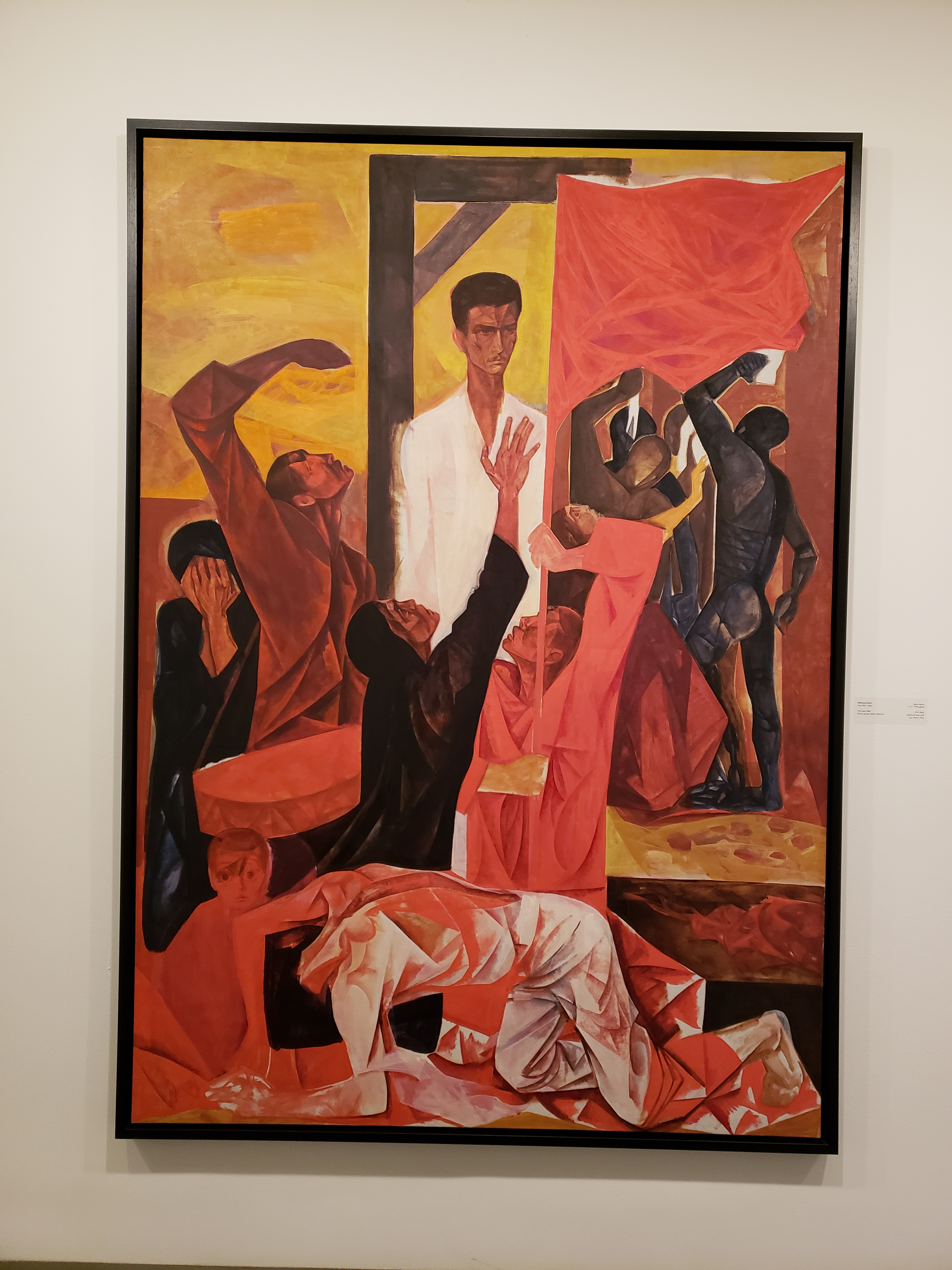
"The Hero" (1963) by Mahmoud Sabri at the Barjeel Art Foundation collection

Sabri was born on 14 July 1927 in Baghdad, Iraq. He studied social sciences at Loughborough University in the late 1940s. While in England, his interest in painting developed and he attended evening art classes there. After a successful career in banking, he became a full-time painter.

In the 1950s he pioneered the painting of social and political issues. Later he studied art formally at the Surikov Institute for Art in Moscow from 1961 to 1963. In 1963, he moved to Prague. In the late 1960s he started working on linking art and science.

He was actively involved in Iraq's arts community through his membership of various art groups. He was a foundation member of Jum'at al Ruwwad (The Avantgarde Group; later known as the Primitive Group) in 1950. Led by his contemporary, Faeq Hassan (1914-1992), this group was inspired by Mespotamian art, Iraqi folklore and the 12th and 13th-century poets of the Baghdad School.

In 1971, he published his Manifesto of the New Art of Quantum Realism (QR)-An application of scientific method in the field of art. QR graphically represents the atomic level of reality using building blocks based on the atomic light spectra of elements in nature. He continued to work on developing QR until his death. He had several publications on art, philosophy and politics in Arabic and English.

He died on 13 April 2012 in Maidenhead, England.

== See also ==
- Iraqi art
- List of Iraqi artists
