= Pothanikkad =

POTHANICAD
- Village
- Location in Kerala, India POTHANICAD (India)
- Coordinates: 10.006144°N 76.680812°E
- Country: India
- State: Kerala
- District: Ernakulam

Area
  - Total: 24.34 km^{2} (9.40 sq mi)

Population (2011)
  - Total: 19,309
  - Density: 793.3/km^{2} (2,055/sq mi)

Languages
  - Official: Malayalam, English
- Time zone: UTC+5:30 (IST)
- PIN: 686671
- Telephone code: 91-485
- Vehicle registration: KL 17 for Muvaattupuzha, KL 44 for Kothamangalam
- Nearest towns: Kothamangalam, Muvattupuzha, Thodupuzha

Pothanikkad, also spelt as Pothanicad is a village in Ernakulam district in the Indian state of Kerala.

== Notable people ==
- C J George, financier

== Demographics ==
As of 2011 India census, Pothanikkad had a population of 19,309 with 9,620 males and 9,689 females.
