= Pradeep Kar =

Indian businessman

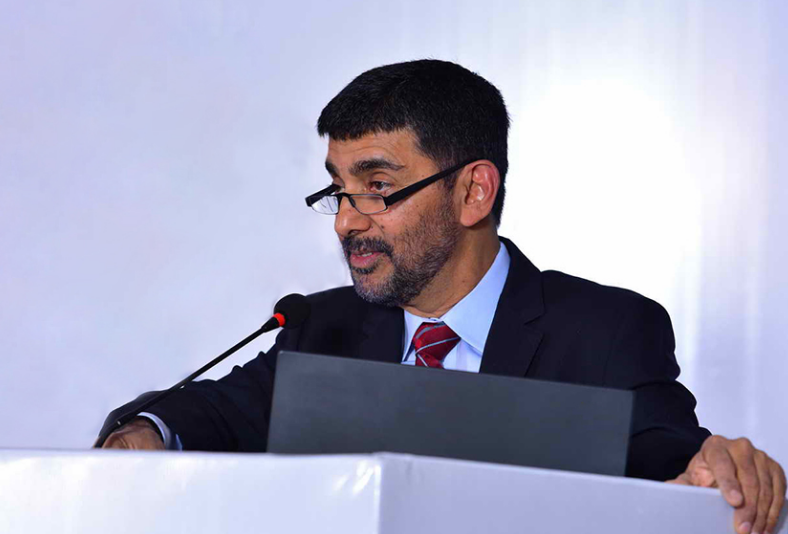
- Kar, during a conference in 2016
- Born: March 11, 1958 (age 68)
- Education: Visvesvaraya National Institute of Technology; S.P. Jain Institute of Management & Research
- Occupations: Chairman and Managing Director of Microland
- Years active: 1989-present
- Spouse: Kalpana Kar
- Children: Pranika Kar
- Website: www.microland.com/about/leaders/pradeep-kar

Pradeep Kar (born March 11, 1958) is the Founder, chairman and managing director of Microland, a technology company. Kar also founded and sold three technology companies, including Indya.com, which he sold to Rupert Murdoch's News Corporation; Planetasia.com, India's first internet professional services company and Net Brahma Technologies.

Pradeep is also associated with the Bengaluru Literature Festival.

== Early life and career ==
Kar graduated from Visvesvaraya National Institute of Technology in 1981, and then received a master's degree in business administration from S.P. Jain Institute of Management & Research. He joined Wipro and soon relocated to US to run Sonata Software for three years. Returning to India he founded Microland, where he has served as the chairman until now.

He also started Planetasia.com, ITspace.com, Media2India.com, and Indya.com which were sold to take advantage of the dotcom bubble.

Kar has been recognized with the Indian Express ‘India Young Business Achiever Award’ and was selected by the World Economic Forum as a ‘Global Leader for Tomorrow’. He has been featured in ‘Newsweek International’ as ‘Stars of Asia’ and in ‘Business India’ as ‘Stars of India’.

== Boards and affiliations ==
Kar served as a Non-Executive Director of UBM plc., a global events-led marketing and communications services business listed on the London Stock Exchange for 10 years from 2006 to 2016, and is on the Board of Telstra Telecommunications India. He is a member of the Provost's Council of Trinity College, Dublin, and serves as Chairman of the Governing Council of Srishti Institute of Art, Design & Technology, Bangalore. He was President of The Indus Entrepreneurs (TiE), Bangalore Chapter and Founding Member of the Bangalore Chapter of the Young Presidents' Organization. He chairs the Infrastructure Management Services Forum of NASSCOM, the apex body of the Indian software & services industry
