= Su-Kam Power Systems =

Indian electrical products company

Su-Kam Power Systems Ltd.
- Type: Private
- Industry: Energy
- Founded: 1988; 38 years ago
- Headquarters: Plot No. 54, Udyog Vihar, Phase VI, Sector-37, Gurgaon, Haryana, India
- Area served: Worldwide
- Key people: Mr.Vishnu Prakash Goyal; Mr.Ashok Kumar Gupta; Mr.Navraj Mittal; Mr. Yajan Bansal
- Products: Inverters, batteries, UPS, solar power, batteries

Su-Kam Power Systems Ltd. is an Indian power solutions company that provides backup energy systems for both domestic and industrial markets. The company focuses on environmentally sustainable technologies, particularly in the area of solar power. Its product portfolio includes inverters, batteries, solar off-grid and on-grid systems, as well as lithium-ion batteries.

== History ==
Su-Kam was founded as a startup in 1988 by Kunwer Sachdev recognizing the widespread problem of unreliable electricity supply in India. In the power backup sector, the company set a record for the highest export sales by an Indian manufacturer. It pioneered several innovations in the Indian market, including the introduction of DSP sinewave inverters and plastic-body inverters. Su-Kam holds the distinction of filing the largest number of patents in the power backup industry, averaging two patents per month.

The company launched plastic body inverters, recognized by India Today as one of the top 10 innovations of the decade in 2010. Su-Kam introduced India's first touchscreen solar PCU, featuring an MPPT solar charge controller and smartphone monitoring through built-in Wi-Fi.

Further innovation came with the introduction of solar street lights equipped with in-built lithium-ion batteries, offering higher efficiency than traditional lead-acid-based models.

In April 2023, Su-Kam Power signed a Memorandum of Understanding (MoU) with the Government of Himachal Pradesh to invest ₹300 crore in establishing an energy storage facility in the state. The company also announced plans to explore the two-wheeler and commercial electric vehicle (EV) markets.

In 2025, the company announced plans to establish a 500 MW lithium-ion battery manufacturing facility in Baddi, Himachal Pradesh.

== Foreign operations and exports ==
Su-Kam's exports are growing. Su-Kam's total exports contribute around 20-25% of the revenue of its entire business, and most of it comes from Africa. Su-Kam has also been awarded the title 'Africa's Most Reliable Inverter Brand'.

Among its notable international achievements, Su-Kam secured a solar project to electrify 35 schools in Rwanda and established a dedicated product experience centre in Uganda. According to media reports, the company is actively involved in solar initiatives across Nigeria, Gabon, Afghanistan, and Malawi.

In Gabon, Su-Kam installed 2,000 solar street lights across the villages of Kango, Mouila, and Bitam. In Malawi, the company deployed hybrid power systems—utilizing both wind and solar energy—in five remote villages: Chigundu, Mdayaka, Eluyumi, Kumbande, and Kadzuwa.

== CSR initiatives ==
Su-Kam has actively contributed to social development through various corporate social responsibility (CSR) initiatives. The company adopted the village of Baniyani in the Rohtak district of Haryana—the native village of Manohar Lal Khattar, the current Chief Minister of Haryana. Su-Kam plans to develop the village under a public-private partnership model.

In a media interview, the Managing Director of Su-Kam stated that the company would support infrastructure enhancements, including improvements to the government school and the installation of street lighting throughout the village.

Following the devastating earthquake in Nepal in April 2015, Su-Kam provided relief by distributing food supplies and 800 solar home lighting systems to affected communities.

== Coverage in books and TV media ==
Su-Kam has received national attention for its contributions to renewable energy and rural electrification. Discovery Channel India aired a documentary titled “Sun Fuel India”, which highlighted how Su-Kam’s solar installations are transforming both villages and urban areas across India by promoting the adoption of solar power.

== Awards ==
Su-Kam’s solar power conditioning unit received the Excellence Award in the Energy Category from the India Electronics and Semiconductor Association (IESA). This recognition highlights the company’s innovation and leadership in developing advanced solar energy solutions within the Indian power sector.

== Products ==
- Inverters: Wide range for home and industrial use, ensuring uninterrupted power during outages.
- Batteries: Includes lead-acid and lithium-ion variants. Lithium batteries offer faster charging, longer life, and are available in 25.6V, 48V, and 51.2V models for ESS, telecom, and home backup.
- Solar Solutions: Complete solar systems with inverters. All-in-one solar units (5.5kW/10kW) for homes, clinics, and offices.
- UPS Systems: Backup power for sensitive devices like computers and medical equipment.
- EV & Energy Solutions: Lithium batteries for e-rickshaws, scalable ESS for residential and commercial use, and smart energy management systems for optimized power usage.

== Global Presence ==
Su-Kam exports its power solutions to over 90 countries, including key markets such as Nigeria, Iraq, Syria, Yemen, Uganda, Tanzania, Zambia, Malawi, Zimbabwe, the Democratic Republic of Congo, and the UAE. Its international presence is driven by an extensive distribution network and a deep understanding of localized energy requirements across Africa, the Middle East, and Asia.
