= Keshav Bansal =

Indian entrepreneur (born 1992)

- Born: 4 February 1992 (age 34); New Delhi, India
- Education: Manchester Business School; IILM Institute for Higher Education
- Occupations: Director, Intex Technologies
- Known for: Intex Technologies; Gujarat Lions
- Father: Narendra Bansal
- Website: Official website

Keshav Bansal is an Indian entrepreneur. He is the director of Intex Technologies, an Indian consumer durables, which is India's second-largest selling mobile phone and IT accessories manufacturer company. He was the owner of the dissolved Rajkot-based team, Gujarat Lions in the Indian Premier League. He is also the youngest owner of an Indian Premier League Team. GQ India named him as #9 among the 50 Most Influential Young Indians for 2016.

== Early life and education ==
Bansal was born and brought up in New Delhi and he did his schooling from The Heritage School in Vasant Kunj, New Delhi. He is the son of Narendra Bansal, who founded Intex Technologies in 1996. Currently, Keshav Bansal, is the active director of the company.

He pursued management studies at IILM Institute for Higher Education in New Delhi after spending a year at the Alliance Manchester Business School. He is also a fitness enthusiast, former state-level tennis player

== Business career ==
Bansal started with the Logistics Department of Intex Technologies (owned by his father Narendra Bansal) in the year 2012. He later worked with the marketing department and took over as director in the year 2013. In 2016, Intex Technologies bought the Rajkot based IPL franchise Gujarat Lions. The acquisition made him the youngest owner of an IPL team.

== Awards/recognition ==
- 2016 #9 on the list of Top 50 most influential young Indians by GQ India
- 2016 Amity Leadership Award for Business Excellence, 2016 by Amity Education Group
- 2016 Extraordinaire Award for The Dynamic Young Leader by Times Now
- 2013 Young Entrepreneur of the Year 2013 by NCN Magazine

== See also ==
- List of Indian entrepreneurs
- Intex Technologies
- Gujarat Lions
