= Intex Technologies =

Indian multinational technology company

- Type: Private
- Industry: Technology; Telecommunications; Consumer electronics; Smartphones; Electronics
- Founded: January 1996; 30 years ago
- Founder: Narendra Bansal
- Headquarters: New Delhi, India
- Area served: Worldwide
- Key people: Keshav Bansal (Director)
- Products: Desktop computers; Mobile phones; Mobile phone accessories; Washing machine; Air conditioner; Coolers; LED; Televisions; Audio equipment; UPS; Consumer durables; Webcams; Security cameras; Refrigerators
- Services: Electronics manufacturing services
- Revenue: ▲₹6,200 crore (US$660 million)
- Number of employees: 10,000+
- Website: www.intex.in

Intex Technologies is an Indian multinational technology company based in New Delhi, India that manufactures smartphones, consumer electronics, and other accessories. It also provides consumer electronic products such as MP3 players, DVD players and speakers. It was founded in 1996 and is headquartered in New Delhi, India.

== History ==
The company was established in 1996 at New Delhi by Narendra Bansal. Currently, Keshav Bansal, son of Narendra Bansal, is the active director of the company.

In 2012, from an IT product company, Intex Technologies expanded its consumer durables portfolio with the entry in LED TVs business. The LED TVs business has seen a growth of over 150% and the company has a 6% share in LED TVs and 3% share in washing machines nationally.

== IPL Team ==
The company also owned an IPL franchise called Gujarat Lions in 2016 and 2017.
