= Sunil John =

Indian businessman

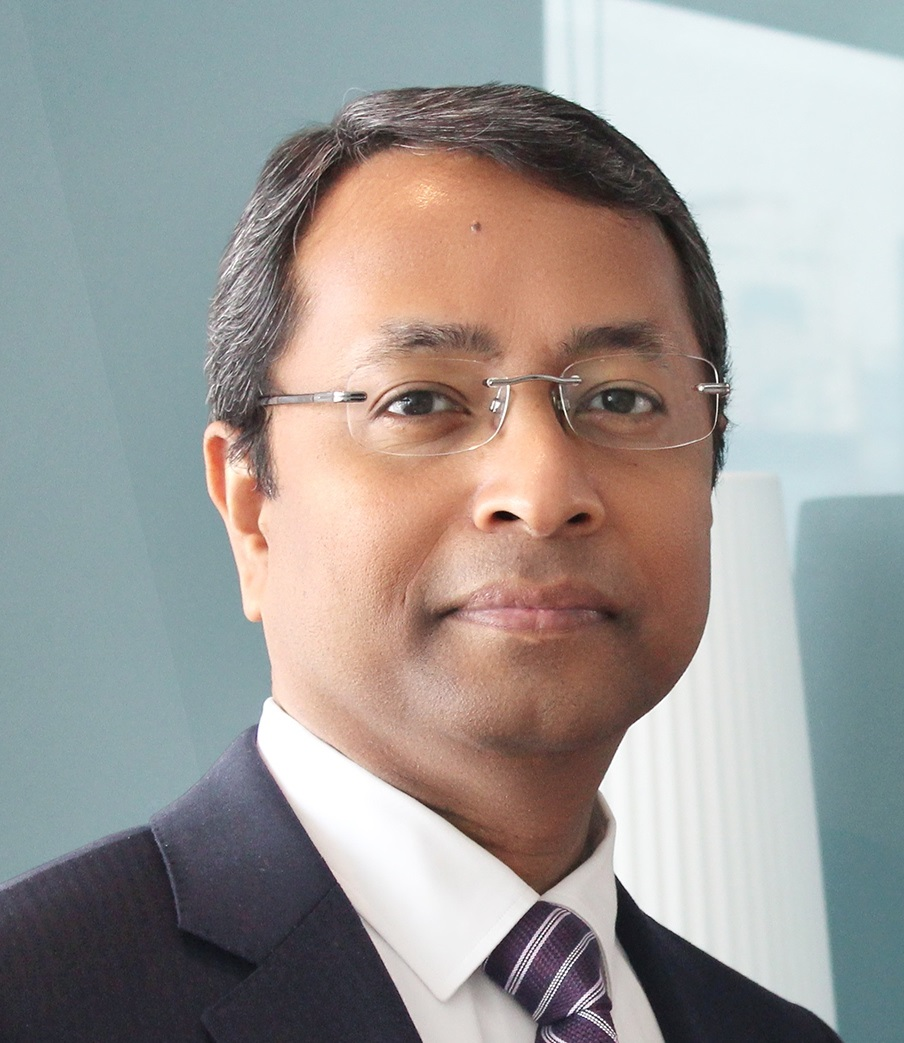
- Citizenship: India
- Occupation: Businessman
- Known for: Public relations advisor
- Awards: MEPRA (Middle East Public Relations Association) Fellowship Award 2018 Chairman's Award at MEPRA PR Awards 2016 SABRE Award for Outstanding Individual Achievement 2014
- Website: www.asdaa-bcw.com

Sunil John is the founder of ASDA'A BCW and President - Middle East of BCW owned by the $20.7 billion WPP Group.

== Personal life ==
John earned his bachelor's degree in science (1980) and master's degree in communication and journalism (1982) from Osmania University, Hyderabad. He started his career as an investigative journalist with the Deccan Chronicle, Hyderabad, before moving into the public relations sector with the Indian Oil Corporation in Mumbai and then with Thermax in Pune. He moved to Dubai, UAE, in 1994 to join the nascent PR sector in the Middle East region.

== Career ==
John has been in the communication and public relations business for nearly three decades, including the last 25 years in the Middle East region. John founded ASDA'A in 2000, which merged with the global public relations firm Burson-Marsteller in 2008 to form ASDA'A Burson-Marsteller, majority owned by the $20.7 billion WPP Group, a global communication holding company. After the merger of Burson-Marsteller and Cohn & Wolfe in February 2018, ASDA'A Burson-Marsteller is now ASDA'A BCW. John continues to be a significant shareholder in the firm.

ASDA'A BCW has 8 wholly owned offices and seven affiliates covering 15 countries in the Middle East and North Africa. ASDA'A BCW was named "Middle East Consultancy of the Year 2019" at the EMEA SABRE 2019 Awards by The Holmes Report. ASDA’A BCW was also named “PR Agency of the Year – Middle East and Africa 2019” at the International Business Awards by Stevie Awards and a ‘Grand Stevie’ for ranking third among the ‘Top 10 Honoured Organizations’ globally.

John received the SABRE Award for Outstanding Individual Achievement (EMEA) from The Holmes Report on 20 May 2014. He is the first PR professional from the Middle East to be honoured with this prestigious global award. He was also honoured with the MEPRA Fellowship Award on 10 May 2018 and the Chairman's Award 2016 at the Middle East Public Relations Association (MEPRA) Awards on 23 November 2016. He has been listed on the "Arabian Business 100 Inspiring leaders in the Middle East" in March 2018 and "Arabian Business 100 influential people helping shape the Emirate" in May 2018.

In 2018, John said that one of the few industries where truth, facts, honesty and evidence are positively thriving is public relations and urged all PR practitioners to adopt the universal PR Compact based on four simple tenets – insist on accuracy, demand transparency, engage in the free and open exchange of ideas and require everyone to take universal online ethics training.

Since 2008, John leads the annual ASDA'A BCW Arab Youth Survey – the largest survey of its kind of the Middle East region's largest demographic. The 11th annual Arab Youth Survey was launched on April 30, 2019.

John chaired the organizing committee of the 20th Public Relations World Congress held in Dubai from 13 to 15 March 2012.

John previously served as the UAE National Chair of International Public Relations Association and vice president of the IPRA Gulf Chapter.

John also served as a director at DAR Motion Pictures, an India-based movie production and distribution company that has produced a dozen feature films. The Lunchbox, co-produced by John, won the Critics Week Viewers' Choice Award at Cannes Film Festival.
