= Microland =

Indian technology company

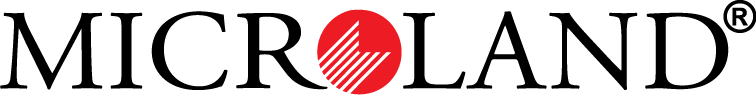
- Type: Public
- Industry: Technology
- Founded: 1989; 37 years ago
- Founder: Pradeep Kar
- Headquarters: Bangalore, Karnataka, India
- Area served: India
- Key people: Pradeep Kar (Chairman & Managing Director)
- Services: IT services
- Number of employees: 4500+ (2020)
- Website: www.microland.com

Microland is a technology company, headquartered in Bangalore. It was founded by Pradeep Kar. The company employs more than 4,500 workers across its offices in Asia, Australia, Europe, Africa, and North America. The company's services include digital networks, digital infrastructure, digital applications, digital workplace, IIoT services and cybersecurity.

== History ==
=== 1989–1997 ===
Microland was started in Bangalore, India in August 1989 with a key focus on hardware and networking. It was founded by Pradeep Kar as a network integration company, with initial funding coming from SBI Capital Markets. Microland signed an agreement with Novell to become one of the first companies to bring network education to India. In the years between 1993 and 1997, Microland assisted in the introduction of new technologies to the Indian market, namely, Compaq, Cisco, SynOptics, and Netscape.

=== 1998–2001 ===
After the advent of the internet economy in 1998, Kar built several companies such as Planetasia.com, indya.com (which he later sold to Rupert Murdoch's News Corporation), ITspace.com, media2india.net and Net Brahma Technologies.

=== 2002–2013 ===
In 2005, the firm signed a five-year contract for remote IT infrastructure management services with UK-based company, Serco. In August 2006, it received $11 million in a second round of funding.

In early 2007, Microland inaugurated its first multi-network operations center facility housing six network operations center, six tech labs, four data centers and one penetration testing lab. In December 2007, it opened a global technology support center in Bangalore. In April 2007, it partnered with Microsoft to provide cloud solutions to large enterprises in India.

In 2008, it added managed security assessment and ITSM consulting to its services. In 2011, the firm signed a $55 million multi-year contract with Serco Limited, UK to provide specialist support through an expanded team located in Birmingham, UK, and Bangalore, India.

=== 2014–2017 ===
On 26 August 2014, Microland completed 25 years of operation and was recognized as the first Hybrid IT Infrastructure provider in India. On 2 December 2014, the firm partnered with Computacenter in opening the Global Network Operations Centre (GNOC) at Bagmane Tech Park, Bangalore. In 2015, Saudi Arabia's National Commercial Bank (NCB) selected Microland as its IT infrastructure services partner to manage its branch technology services across the kingdom. In 2016, it set up its first offshore delivery center for ASG group, Australia in Bagmane Tech Park, Bangalore. In 2017, Microland reinforced its digital focus with MicrolandOne, a digital app for its workforce. In line with its digital initiatives, it launched Digital hubs in Birmingham, UK and Pune, India.

=== 2019–present ===
In January 2019, the company announced the appointment of Srikara CR as Senior Vice President of Global Professional Services and Presales. In August 2019 they hired Ashish Mahadwar as president. In October 2019, the company announced the appointment of Anupam Pandey as Chief Information Officer. Gopal Sharma was then appointed to the role in 2023. In 2024, Sam Mathew was announced as the new president of Microland. In 2025, Microland opened an Artificial Intelligence Center of Excellence in its Bengaluru headquarters.

== See also ==
- List of Indian IT companies
