= C. J. George =

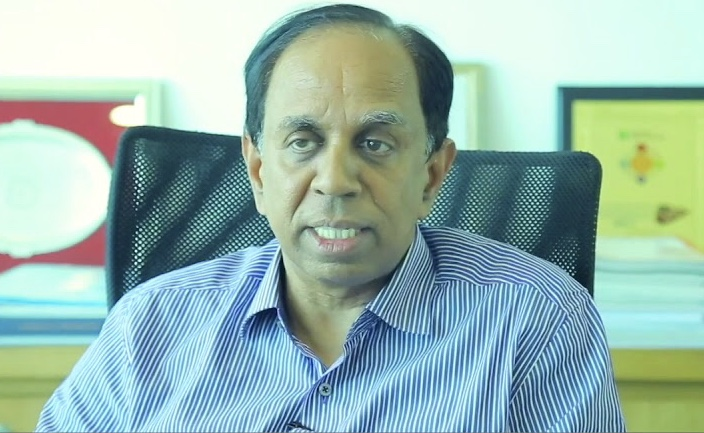
- Born: Pothanikkad, Ernakulam, Kerala, India
- Spouse: Shiny George
- Children: 2
- Website: www.geojit.com

Chenayappillil John George is an Indian businessman and philanthropist. He is the founder and managing director of Geojit Financial Services.

== Personal life ==
George was born in Pothanikkad, a suburb of Ernakulam in the south Indian state of Kerala. He is married to Shiny George and the couple has two sons.

== Career ==
While pursuing a part-time LLB in Delhi, George began working as an analyst with Batliwala and Karani Securities (B&K Securities). Later George dropped out from his LLM course and moved to Cochin to join B&K Securities' Cochin office. George's founding partner, Ranajit Kanjilal, was then a client of B&K. Together, in 1987, they set up the firm Geojit & Co, by combining the names of both partners ("Geo" from George and "Jit" from Renajit) Kanjilal retired from the firm in 1991 selling his shares to George, thereby bringing Geojit under his sole proprietorship.

== Associations ==
George is also the executive committee member of the National Stock Exchange of India, National Securities Depository Limited, Managing committee member of ASSOCHAM, Director of V-Guard Industries, Director of Aster DM Healthcare and former Director of Federal Bank and Joyalukkas. He is also a charter member of the Financial Planning Standards Board India.
