= Kunwer Sachdev =

Indian entrepreneur (born 1962)

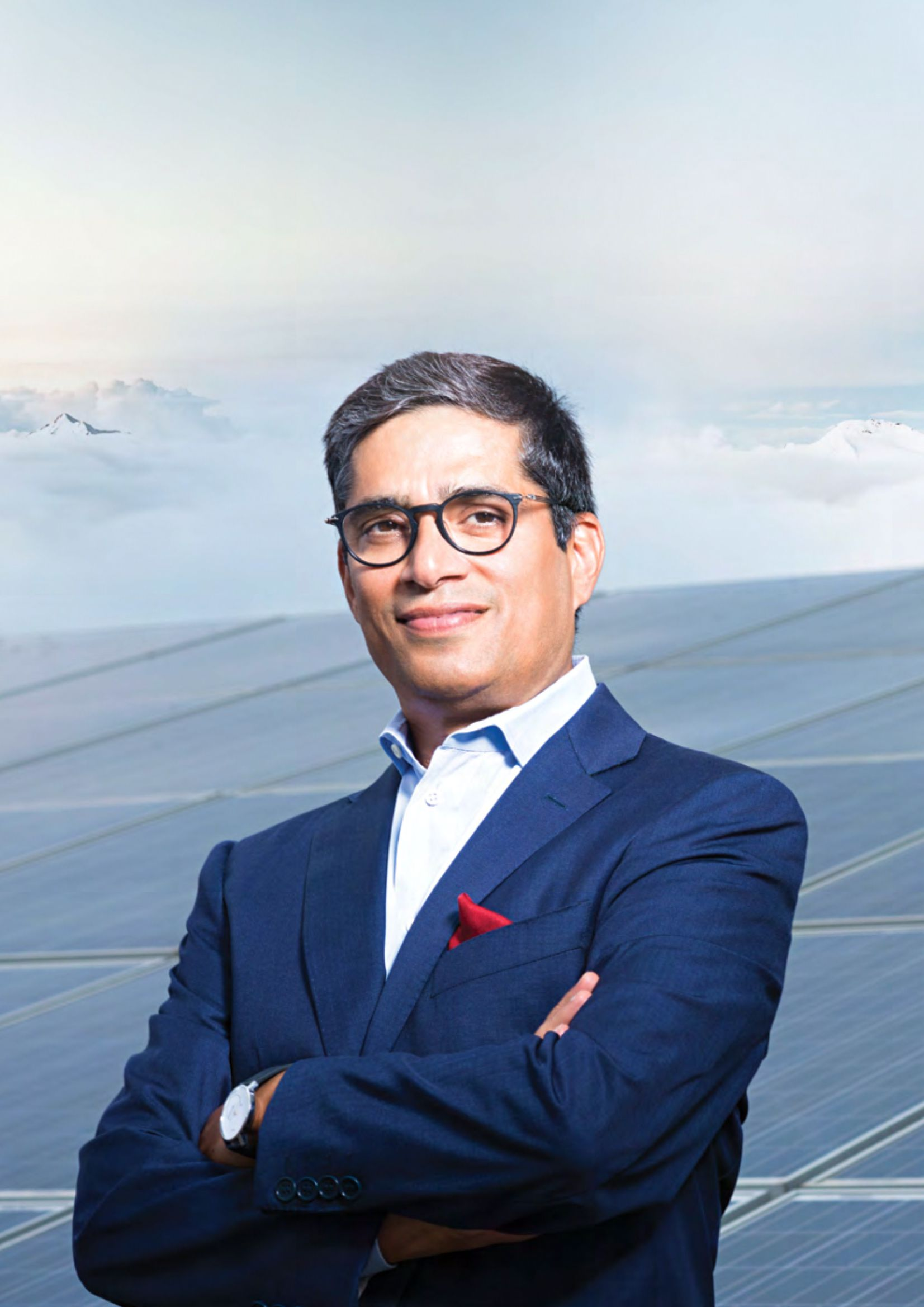
- Education: Bachelor of Laws
- Alma mater: University of Delhi
- Occupation: Entrepreneur
- Years active: 1988–present
- Organization: Su-Kam Power Systems
- Awards: Entrepreneur of the Year 2011
- Website: kunwersachdev.com

Kunwer Sachdev is an Indian entrepreneur and businessperson. He founded Su-Kam Power Systems Ltd in 1998, establishing one of India’s early organised manufacturers of inverter and power-backup systems.

He is also the mentor of Su-Vastika, an Indian power backup provider started by his wife, Khushbhoo Sachdev, in 2019. He is also active as a mentor and industry advisor, including association with startup and investor networks such as Delhi Angels.

He is also a member of the Gurugram Metropolitan Development Authority, a government agency in Gurugram, Haryana, India.

== Early life ==
Kunwer Sachdev was born to Krishan Lal Sachdeva, a section officer in the Indian Railways.

== Education ==
Kunwar Sachdev completed his primary education at a government school in Delhi's Punjabi Bagh. He had wanted to become a doctor since childhood, but he became a businessman.

After completing his intermediate education, Sachdev joined Hindu College in Delhi and graduated with a degree in Statistics. After this, he obtained the degree of Bachelor of Laws from the University of Delhi.

== Career ==
=== Early career ===
Sachdev’s entrepreneurial career began at a young age. As a teenager, he sold pens to support his older brother’s business, gaining early exposure to sales and customer engagement. After a brief period working in telecommunications, he started his own cable television installation and equipment business in the late 1980s with modest capital. This business marked his first venture into manufacturing and market operations.

In 1998, recognising the widespread problem of unreliable electricity supply in India, Sachdev shifted focus from cable TV to power-backup solutions. He founded Su-Kam Power Systems Ltd, initially investing a small amount to enter the largely unorganised inverter market. Sachdev quickly identified the need for reliable, efficient inverters and began developing products tailored to local conditions.

=== Later career ===
During the 2000s and early 2010s, Su-Kam expanded rapidly under Sachdev’s guidance. The company grew its product range to include advanced UPS systems, solar hybrid power solutions and battery technologies and began exporting to more than 70 countries.

The company faced financial pressures in the late 2010s, and by 2018, Sachdev’s formal association with Su-Kam ended when the company faced insolvency proceedings.

Following this phase, Sachdev became a mentor and strategic leader for Su-Vastika Systems Private Limited, a newer power backup and energy-storage company founded by his wife, Khushbhoo Sachdev.

During 2024–2025, Su-Vastika expanded its technology and manufacturing roadmap under Sachdev’s guidance. A development in this period was a strategic investment and collaboration with Rotomag Enertec Ltd.

== Views and opinions ==
Sachdev has expressed a number of views on entrepreneurship, leadership, and technological innovation through interviews and public discussions associated with his work at Su-Kam Power Systems. His perspectives generally emphasise problem-solving, organizational leadership, and continuous innovation as essential elements of business development.

Sachdev has described entrepreneurship primarily as a process of identifying and addressing practical problems.

== Media ==
Books

Sachdev has been profiled in several publications on Indian entrepreneurship. He is featured in Connect the Dots by Rashmi Bansal, which documents the journeys of self-made entrepreneurs without formal business training. His company, Su-Kam, is discussed in Booming Brands by Harsh Pamnani, a work that examines innovative Indian businesses. Sachdev is also included in Making Breakthrough Innovation Happen (2009) by Porus Munshi, which highlights notable innovations in India, including developments in inverter technology associated with Su-Kam.

== Awards ==
Kunwer Sachdev was awarded the 'Entrepreneur of the Year 2011' at the Entrepreneur India Awards. He has been awarded one of 'India's Most Respected Entrepreneurs' by Hurun, a media publishing group.
