= Geojit Financial Services =

Indian investment services company

Geojit Financial Services Ltd.
- Type: Public
- Traded as: BSE: 532285; NSE: GEOJITFSL
- Industry: Financial services
- Founded: 1987
- Headquarters: Kochi, Kerala, India
- Key people: C J George
- Products: Investment Management Solutions
- Website: www.geojit.com

Geojit Financial Services Ltd. is an investment services company in India headquartered in Kochi, Kerala. It operates a network of offices across India and the Middle East. Geojit was the first company in India to launch online-trading facilities, develop franchise models of sub-broking, form joint ventures in West Asia and the first to begin commodity futures trading in pepper, cardamom, gold and silver in India.

The product offerings of the company include equities and derivatives to mutual funds, life and general insurance, commodities derivatives and portfolio management services. The company has 512 offices across the country. Through joint ventures and associates, the company has expanded its presence globally with offices in Dubai, Abu Dhabi, Sharjah, Al Ain, Muscat, Riyadh, Dammam, Bahrain and Kuwait. Geojit is listed on the National Stock Exchange (NSE) and the Bombay Stock Exchange (BSE).

== About ==
Geojit was founded by C J George in 1987 and the major stakeholders of the company include C J George – Managing Director of Geojit, global banking major BNP Paribas, Kerala State Industrial Development Corporation and Rakesh Jhunjhunwala. As of 31 December 2017, it has over Rs.41,000 crores as assets under custody and management, servicing over 913,000 clients.

The network of Geojit covers more than 300 cities in states in India such as Andhra Pradesh, Bihar, Chhattisgarh, Goa, Gujarat, Haryana, Jammu and Kashmir, Karnataka, Kerala, Madhya Pradesh, Maharashtra, New Delhi, Orissa, Punjab, Rajasthan, Tamil Nadu & Pondicherry, Telangana, Uttar Pradesh, Uttaranchal and West Bengal.

The company has B2B partnerships with a number banks such as Axis Bank (the partnership received IBA recognition 2007 & 2008), Federal Bank, Andhra Bank, Oriental Bank of Commerce, SVC Bank (Shamrao Vithal Co-operative Bank), Corporation Bank, South Indian Bank and IndusInd Bank.

== History ==
C J George, founder and CEO of the company, set up M/s C.J George and Co. in 1987 with Ranajit Kanjilal as a partner. However, a formal partnership was formed in 1988 after Kanjilal acquired membership in the Cochin Stock Exchange. The firm was then renamed as Geojit and Co. The name 'Geojit' was coined by conjoining the first and last three letters in the names of the partners who set up the organization – C J George and Ranajit Kanjilal.

In 1992, Kanjilal left the organization, and Geojit became a sole proprietorship.

In 1993, the company opened its first branch in Muvattupuzha in Ernakulam and followed it up with another branch in Trichur in Kerala.

== Growth and Expansion ==
In 1994, Geojit became a public limited company with a new name – Geojit Securities Ltd. It was the first brokerage firm that became a corporation in Kochi and one of the earliest in India. In 1995, Kerala State Industrial Development Corporation (KSIDC) became a co-promoter of Geojit by acquiring 22% stake in the company. This is the only instance of a government entity participating in the equity of a stockbroking company. A P Kurian who retired from UTI as its Executive Trustee joined the board of the company as an independent director and chairman.

In October 1995, Geojit went public by issuing 9,50,000 shares of Rs.10 each to gain access to more capital. Shares of the company were listed in Cochin, Chennai, and Delhi exchanges. The IPO was oversubscribed by 15 times. In the same year, Geojit became a member of the NSE, and it opened its first terminal at Cochin.

From 1996 onwards, the company focused on expanding its presence as well as its products and services. Geojit started depository services in 1997, offering customers a Demat facility.

In 1999, the company took membership in the Bombay Stock Exchange (BSE) and its shares were listed in the BSE in 2000. In February 2000, Geojit launched online trading. In 2003, the company ventured into commodity trading with the launch of rubber trading. In 2004, commodity trading in cardamom was launched. In 2005, Rakesh Jhunjhunwala, a renowned Indian Equity Investor, took a significant stake in the company and joined the Board of Directors of the company.

In 2005, Geojit launched Geojit Technologies, another sister concern with an aim to develop state-of-the-art technologies for the financial services field. Geojit Credits, a subsidiary of Geojit Financial Services Ltd., was also launched after registering with the Reserve Bank of India as a Non-Banking Financial Company (NBFC). In the same year, Geojit shares were also listed on the National Stock Exchange of India Limited.

In 2012, Geojit launched Qualified Foreign Investors (QFI) Investment service.

In 2018, the company launched Funds Genie, a mutual fund advisory and investment platform.
