= Narendra Bansal =

Indian entrepreneur

- Born: 1963 (age 62–63); Hanumangarh, Rajasthan, India
- Education: Delhi University (1986)
- Occupations: Chairman & Managing Director Intex Technologies; Owner of Gujarat Lions
- Spouse: Alpa Bansal (m. 1990)
- Children: Keshav Bansal; Ishita Bansal
- Website: Official website

Narendra Bansal (born 1963) is an Indian entrepreneur, philanthropist and the Chairman & Managing Director of Intex Technologies, an Indian consumer durables and India's second-largest selling mobile phone company. He has recently diversified into the sports management arena and has acquired the Gujarat Lions, plays for IPL team.

== Early life and education ==
He was born in 1963 in Hanumangarh, Rajasthan. His father late Bhanwarlal Bansal was a businessman and mother a homemaker. He attended the primary school in his village and after a few years, his family moved to Nepal where he finished his secondary education from Vishwaniketan High School. In 1980, the family moved back to Delhi where he finished his graduation in commerce from Delhi University.

== Business career ==
Narendra Bansal had an entrepreneurial streak from the very beginning and wanted to establish his own business. In 1980s, the music industry was at an inflection point and audio cassettes were gaining a lot of popularity with music enthusiasts. Bansal started his business venture by trading in these compact cassettes. He bought them from various manufacturers and sold them to the retailers in Lajpat Rai Market and Palika Bazaar in Delhi. He was successful in establishing a thriving business and continued the same business model with new products including video cassettes and video cassette recorders (VCRs), which continued till 1987.

He had an interest in technology and, with the arrival of floppy disks in 1987, identified a business opportunity in the emerging field. Using the same distribution and trading model, he expanded the business portfolio from floppy disks to hard drives and RAM.

In September 1994, he started International Impex with a capital of Rs.20,000 into the business that operated out of a basement in East of Kailash in South Delhi. The company dealt in import of floppy disks, Ethernet cards and other accessories. The company gradually expanded in assembling, sales and after services of computers.

In 1996, Bansal founded Intex Technologies, a smartphone, consumer durables and IT accessories manufacturing company which is India's second-largest selling mobile phone company. He made a plea for help in an April 2017 interview with the Financial Times, arguing for the Indian government to protect Indian mobile brands because "every child needs hand-holding by their parents."

== Awards and recognition ==
- 2012: Lifetime Achievement Award by Cell IT Magazine for his contribution towards furthering the IT industry in India
- 2016: Udyog Rattan Award - 2016 by Institute of Economic Studies (IES)
- 2016, Distinguished Entrepreneurship Award by The PHD Chamber of Commerce
- 2016: Outstanding Contribution to Mobile Industry by CEAMA
- 2016: Empresario Most Inspiring Entrepreneur Award 2016 by NITIE

== Philanthropy ==
Along with his family he runs charitable educational and health activities for the benefit of the urban under-privileged people of Delhi. He is a chartered member of TiE and participates actively in various clubs and organisations working towards social causes including the Rotary Club, Manthan and Rajasthan Club.
