= Propequity =

P.E. Analytics
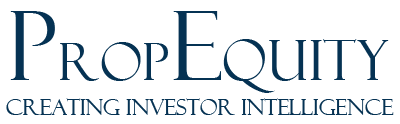
- Type: Private Limited Company
- Industry: Real Estate Data Analytics
- Founded: 2007
- Headquarters: Gurgaon, Republic of India
- Area served: India
- Services: Real Estate Business Intelligence, Customized Research & Consulting, Collateral Risk Management, Catchment Area Analysis

PropEquity, based in India, is an online subscription based real estate data and analytics platform covering 40 cities in India. As of 2015, the company was in talks with Housing.com for a takeover by the latter; but the deal was called off due to internal conflict between investors and the founders.

== Work ==
The Gurgaon-based company is aiding Reserve Bank of India in creating India’s first Housing Start-up Index. It has offices in Gurgaon, Vasant Vihar, Mumbai and Bangalore. It has also tied up with Multi Commodity Exchange of India to develop and launch a real estate index.

== See also ==
- Cash flow statement
- Real estate development
- Real estate investing
