= Ambroli Church =

Church in Girgaum, India

Coordinates: 18.9561491°N 72.8235343°E

Ambroli Church is a Church of North India church in Girgaum, Mumbai that was established in 1831 by the Scottish missionary John Wilson. The unusual name derives from Ambroli House, the name of Wilson's home where the church first gathered which was nearly opposite the current church building. It is believed Ambroli refers to the Gujarati hometown of the migrants who settled in Mumbai, but it is not clear if that place is Amroli. Wilson's educational mission was planned at this site, which led to the founding of Wilson College and Wilson High School. The church covenant was made on 4 February 1831, and the first service was held in Wilson's home on the 6th. Services were conducted in three languages: Hindustani, Marathi and English.

The first members of the church included the Scottish missionary couple John and Margaret Wilson, three Brahman men from the Konkan, one Wani merchant, one Vaishya journalist, one Maratha woman from Bombay, one African sailor, and one "Indo-Portuguese" man from the Konkan who was a former Roman Catholic priest.

The church's first pastors included John Wilson (1831–1870), Dhanjibhai Nauroji (1870–1884, 1894–1900), and Madhavrao B. Nikambe (1884–1894, 1900–1918).

The present-day building was constructed in 1869. The congregation denominationally belongs to the Church of North India (CNI).
