= Mohanlal Lallubhai Dantwala =

Indian agricultural economist

- Born: 18 September 1909; Surat, Gujarat, India
- Died: 8 October 1998 (aged 89)
- Occupations: Agricultural economist Academic; Writer
- Years active: 1934–1998
- Known for: Agricultural economic reforms
- Awards: Padma Bhushan

Mohanlal Lallubhai Dantwala (1909–1998) was an Indian agricultural economist, academic and writer, considered by many as the father of Indian agricultural economics. He was a Gandhian and an Indian independence activist and he suffered incarceration for over six years during the Indian freedom struggle. He authored several books and articles on the agricultural sector of India and was the founder chairperson of the Centre For Development Alternatives (CFDA), a research centre promoting development studies. The Government of India awarded him the third highest civilian honour of the Padma Bhushan, in 1969, for his contributions to Indian science and technology.

== Biography ==
Dantwala was born in Surat, one of the larger cities of the Indian state of Gujarat on 18 September 1909. He did his college studies at MTB Arts College, Surat and Wilson College, Mumbai, winning the James Taylor Prize for academic excellence, after which he worked as a faculty member at the School of Economics of the Mumbai University. It was during this time he got involved in the Indian independence movement and suffered jail terms, intermittently, totaling six and a half years. This caused disruptions in his doctoral studies and his thesis was reportedly submitted while he was serving a jail term at the Arthur Road Jail in Mumbai. Around this time, he also wrote one of his notable works, A Hundred Years of Indian Cotton, a job commissioned by East India Cotton Association and the book had its foreword written by Jawaharlal Nehru.

Dantwala was one of the close collaborators of Mahatma Gandhi and was known to have contributed to the development of the Gandhian ideal of Practical Trusteeship, drafting the proposal document which was published in Harijan in October 1952. After the Indian independence he was associated with several leading political leaders such as Jaiprakash Narayan and Ram Manohar Lohia, assisting them in the formation of Congress Socialist Party. He also served as the private secretary of Morarji Desai for a while and held the chair of the Working Group on Block Level Planning set up by the Planning Commission of India in 1977, which prescribed organizational and operational protocols for socio-economic planning process at block levels. The committee later came to be known as Dantwala Committee. He served as the director of the department of Economics at Mumbai University and was a National Professor of the Government of India. When Centre For Development Alternatives (CFDA) was established in 1998, he became its founder chairperson, a post he held till his death.

Dantwala, who was associated with several global movements in Agricultural Economics, authored several publications on the topic and contributed chapters to several others. Indian Agricultural Development Since Independence, Evaluation of Land Reforms, Poverty in India, Then and Now, 1870-1970, Gandhism Reconsidered and Marketing of Raw Cotton in India are some of his other notable works and he has also edited works such as Dilemmas Of Growth: The Indian Experience and Social Change Through Voluntary Action. He was awarded the civilian honour of the Padma Bhushan by the Government of India in 1969, a year after he was honoured by the Wageningen University and Research Centre, an affiliate of the Wageningen University, with an honorary doctorate, in 1968. He died on 8 October 1998, aged 89. The story of life has been documented in several obituaries, including Remembering M L Dantwala, in the Economic and Political Weekly, and Professor M.L. Dantwala: A Tribute, in Indian Journal of Agricultural Economics, both published in 1998.

== Selected bibliography ==
- M. L. Dantwala; C. N. Vakil (1937). Marketing of Raw Cotton in India. Longmans-Green. p. 268. OCLC 3175125.
- M. L. Dantwala (1945). Gandhism Reconsidered. Padma Publications. p. 64.
- M. L. Dantwala (1948). A Hundred Years of Indian Cotton. East India Cotton Association. p. 135. OCLC 557684279.
- M. L. Dantwala; C. H. Shah (1971). Evaluation of Land Reforms. Department of Economics, Mumbai University. p. 197. OCLC 740856.
- M. L. Dantwala (1973). Poverty in India, Then and Now, 1870-1970. Macmillan India. p. 67. ISBN 9780333900024.
- M. L. Dantwala (1986). Indian Agricultural Development Since Independence. Oxford and IBH Publishing Co. pp. 519. ISBN 8120401182.
- M. L. Dantwala; Pravin Visaria; N. A. Mujumdar; T. R. Sundaram, eds. (1996). Dilemmas Of Growth: The Indian Experience. SAGE Publications. p. 350. ISBN 978-0803992665.
- M. L. Dantwala; Harsh Sethi; Pravin Visaria, eds. (1998). Social Change Through Voluntary Action. SAGE Publications. p. 200. ISBN 9780761992981.
- M. L. Dantwala (2001). Dynamics of Agricultural Development, Volume 1. Concept Publishing Company. ISBN 9788170228356.

== See also ==
- Wilson College, Mumbai
- Wageningen University and Research Centre
