= Alexander Normand =

Scottish chemist and geologist

Alexander Norman
- Education: University of Edinburgh
- Scientific career
- Workplaces: Wilson College, Mumbai

Prof Alexander Robert Normand FRSE FRSGS (4 March 1880 – 18 July 1958) was a Scottish chemist and geologist.

== Life ==
He was born in Edinburgh on 4 March 1880 the son of James Normand of Kirkton Lodge in Murrayfield. He was educated at the Royal High School, Edinburgh then studied chemistry at the University of Edinburgh, graduating with an MA BSc, followed by a PhD.

In 1934 he became Professor of Chemistry at Wilson College in Bombay (now Mumbai). In the same year he was elected a Fellow of the Royal Society of Edinburgh. His proposers were James Pickering Kendall, John Edwin Mackenzie, Thomas Bolam and Ernest Bowman Ludlam.

He died at 33 Moray Place, Edinburgh on 18 July 1958.

== Family ==
In 1909 he married Margaret Elizabeth Murray.
