= Emaar India =

Indian real estate developer

- Type: Private
- Industry: Real estate
- Founded: February 2005; 21 years ago
- Headquarters: Gurugram, India
- Key people: Kalyan Chakrabarti (Chief Executive Officer)
- Parent: Emaar Properties
- Website: in.emaar.com/en/

Emaar India Limited is a real estate developer principally engaged in promotion, construction, development and sale of integrated townships, residential and commercial multi storied buildings, houses, flats, shopping malls, hotels, and other developments. The company develops residential and commercial projects in different parts of India, including Gurugram, Delhi/NCR, Mohali, Lucknow, Indore and other Indian cities.

Emaar started its operations in 2005. The company is promoted by Emaar Properties PJSC, Dubai (“Emaar”). Being a subsidiary of Emaar, the company is also controlled and managed by Emaar in India.

== History ==
On April 11, 2016, Emaar Properties terminated its joint venture with MGF Developments. Following this, Emaar MGF Land Ltd filed the demerger scheme in Delhi High Court on May 16, 2016.

In August 2017, Emaar India stated that it has appointed of Snapdeal’s Chief Strategy & Investment Officer Jason Kothari and Sudip Mullick of the law firm Khaitan & Co to the board of directors.

Emaar India communicated to its customers about initiating the process of demerger of the Company pursuant to a Scheme of Arrangement under Section 391-394 of the Companies Act, 1956 and filing such Scheme with Delhi High Court. It also shared target completion schedules for all projects with achievement of specific milestones and uploaded the same on its website to reassure customers that ongoing projects would be completed.

Emaar revamped its project management team to speed up execution and delivery of over 50 projects that were stuck due to the impending demerger between the two parent companies. The developer hired over 100 additional employees in the Project Management space. The developer increased its workforce to 10,000 labourers at the time of initiating the demerger process. By September 2017, the labourers headcount was more than 15,000.

== Projects ==
- Emaar Palm Gardens
- Emaar Palm Hills
- Emaar Palm Heights
- Emaar Palm Square
- Emaar Digi Homes
- Emaar Business District 65
- Emaar Business District 114
- Emaar Business District 89
- Emaar Colonnade
- Emaar Emerald Plaza
- Emaar Continental City
- Mohali Hills
- Central Plaza
- The Views
- Emaar Emerald Hills
- Emaar Marbella
- Emaar Elite Oasis

== Controversy ==
In response to a directive from a Gurugram court, authorities filed an FIR against UAE-based realtor company Emaar Properties PJSC, its Indian subsidiary Emaar India, and 13 others. The allegations included cheating MGF, their former business partner, through the undervaluation of land and other offenses. Emaar India refuted any criminal association, describing the accusations as an attempt by MGF to harass Emaar and its employees.

The FIR, initiated on November 20, 2023, following an order by Chief Judicial Magistrate Ramesh Chander, names Emaar Properties PJSC, Emaar India Ltd, director Bharat Bhushan Garg, and others. According to the complaint filed by Saurabh Singh on behalf of MGF Development Limited, the accused undervalued land in Gurugram sectors, allegedly with the assistance of Jones Lang Laselle (JLL), an independent valuer. The complaint asserts that forged valuation reports were created to cause wrongful loss to MGF. Additionally, Emaar is accused of exploiting warranty indemnity and litigation indemnity agreements for personal gain, leading to losses for MGF.

== Awards ==
=== 2017 ===
- Emaar India has won 4 awards at the DNA Real Estate & Infrastructure Awards 2017, in Mumbai - 'Developer of the Year - Residential', 'Employer of the Year Real Estate', 'Residential Property of the Year' for its Emerald Hills project, and 'CSR Initiative of the Year by a Real Estate Firm' for its creche program ‘Guardians of Hope’.
- Emaar India has won 2 awards at the 9th Realty Plus Conclave and Excellence Awards 2017 - 'Developer of the Year' in the Residential category, and 'Green Project of the Year for Digital Greens'.

=== 2016 ===
- Emaar India has won the ‘Residential Project of the Year’ award for The Palm Drive (Gurgaon) at the DNA Real Estate & Infrastructure Awards 2016.
- Emaar India has won 2 awards at the 8th Realty Plus Conclave and Excellence Awards 2016 - 'Luxury Project of the Year - The Commercial Property of the Year - The Palm Springs Plaza'.
- Emaar India has won The Palm Drive, Gurugram wins ‘Residential Project of the Year’ at DNA Real Estate Awards 2016.
