= Jason Kothari =

Entrepreneur and business leader

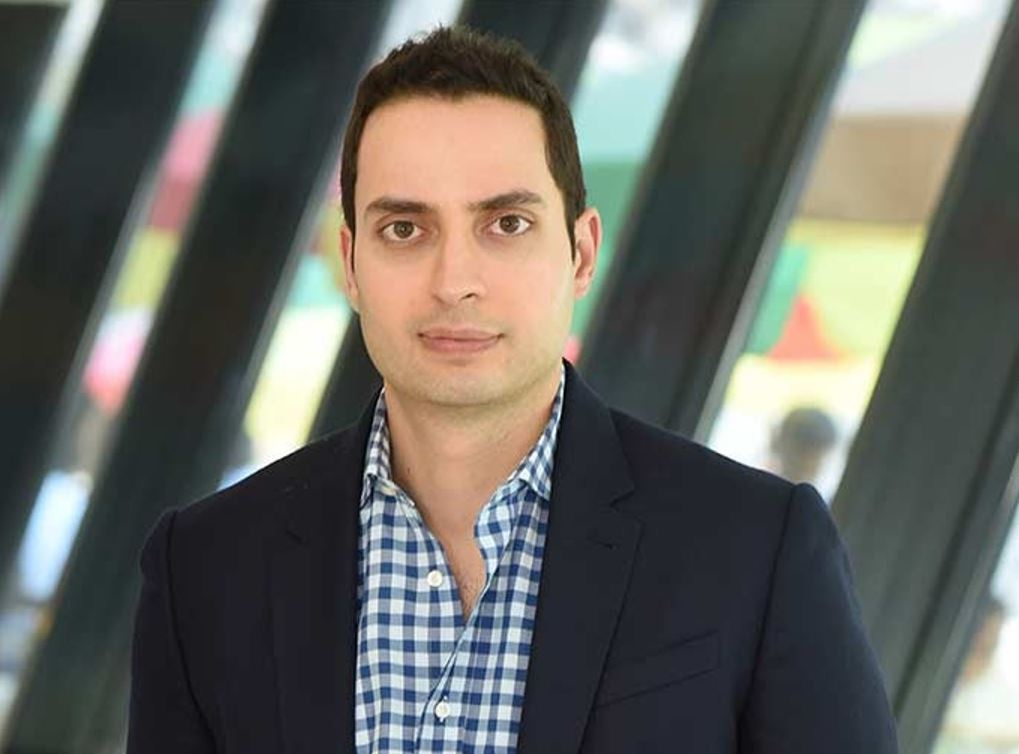
- Born: Hong Kong
- Education: The Wharton School of the University of Pennsylvania
- Occupations: Entrepreneur, film producer, author
- Known for: CEO - Housing.com, FreeCharge & Valiant Entertainment and CSIO- Snapdeal
- Title: Board Member, Emaar India

Jason Kothari is an entrepreneur and business leader, known as a turnaround expert. He is the former CEO of Housing.com and FreeCharge. Previously, Kothari was the Chief Strategy and Investment Officer at Snapdeal. He started his career as the co-founder and CEO of Valiant Entertainment, a superhero entertainment company in the US. He acquired the bankrupt superhero entertainment company while a college student at Wharton and later sold it for $100 million to Hollywood and China-based DMG Entertainment.

== Career ==
Born in Hong Kong, Kothari spent his early childhood and teenage years there. At 15 years old, he had his first job at Media Asia Films in Hong Kong where he was an assistant to actor Jackie Chan.

Kothari moved to the U.S. to pursue further education. While a college student at The Wharton School, Kothari acquired the bankrupt superhero entertainment company – Valiant Entertainment. The company became the third largest superhero entertainment company after Marvel and DC Comics, was named Publisher of the Year and went on to sign a five-movie partnership with Sony Pictures. Valiant Entertainment was later sold for $100 million to Hollywood and China-based DMG Entertainment.

Kothari moved to India in 2015, becoming the CEO of Housing.com, a Softbank-backed online real estate company. At Housing.com, he led the turnaround of the company by enabling 400% growth in revenue and 70% reduction in costs. Kothari led the merger of Housing.com with News Corp's PropTiger to create the US$350 million industry leader.

Subsequently, he joined another Softbank–backed company Snapdeal as the Chief Strategy & Investment Officer. He was instrumental in transforming the company from a monthly loss of over US$20 million to a profit with his “Snapdeal 2.0” strategy and plan.

During his time at Snapdeal, Kothari was also the CEO of distressed digital payments company, FreeCharge. Kothari led the sale of FreeCharge for $60 million to Axis Bank.

Currently, Kothari is on the Board of Directors of Emaar India, a subsidiary of Dubai-based Emaar Properties, known for developing the Burj Khalifa, the tallest building in the world. Additionally, he has also been a senior advisor to many companies including Softbank, and Noon.com, a Middle East e-commerce company.

In 2019, there were media reports that stated Jason was among the candidates shortlisted by SoftBank for the global CEO position of WeWork, the American office-sharing company.

Sony Pictures released the movie ‘Bloodshot’ starring Vin Diesel, where Kothari is an Executive Producer, worldwide on March 13, 2020. Kothari imagined the story of the Valiant comic book ‘Bloodshot’ as a movie at the age of 12 and years later worked on bringing it to the big screen, including landing the movie deal with Sony Pictures.

In 2020, HarperCollins published ‘Irrationally Passionate: My Turnaround from Rebel to Entrepreneur’ authored by Kothari. Irrationally Passionate is an entrepreneurial memoir that shares his turnaround story and learnings across geographies, industries and companies. The book was a critically acclaimed memoir that debuted in the top five books in India.
