= Freecharge =

Indian financial services company

Freecharge Payment Technologies Pvt. Ltd.
- Trade name: Freecharge
- Type: Subsidiary
- Industry: Internet
- Founded: August 2010; 16 years ago
- Founders: Kunal Shah; Sandeep Tandon
- Headquarters: Gurugram, Haryana India
- Area served: India
- Key people: Sumit Bhatnagar (CEO)
- Services: Recharges, Bill Payments, UPI Money Transfers, Deals, Gift Cards, Mutual Funds
- Revenue: ▲₹465 crore (US$48 million) (2024)
- Net income: ▲₹78 crore (US$8.1 million) (2024)
- Parent: Axis Bank
- Website: www.freecharge.in

Freecharge is an Indian financial services company based in Gurgaon. It allows users to pay bills such as electricity, gas and telephone, as well as recharge mobile, broadband, DTH and metro cards.

On 8 April 2015, Snapdeal acquired Freecharge in what was referred to as the second biggest takeover in the Indian e-commerce sector at the time, after the buy out of Ibibo by rival MakeMyTrip. The deal was for approximately US$400 million in cash and stock. On 27 July 2017, Axis Bank acquired Freecharge for $60 million.

== History ==
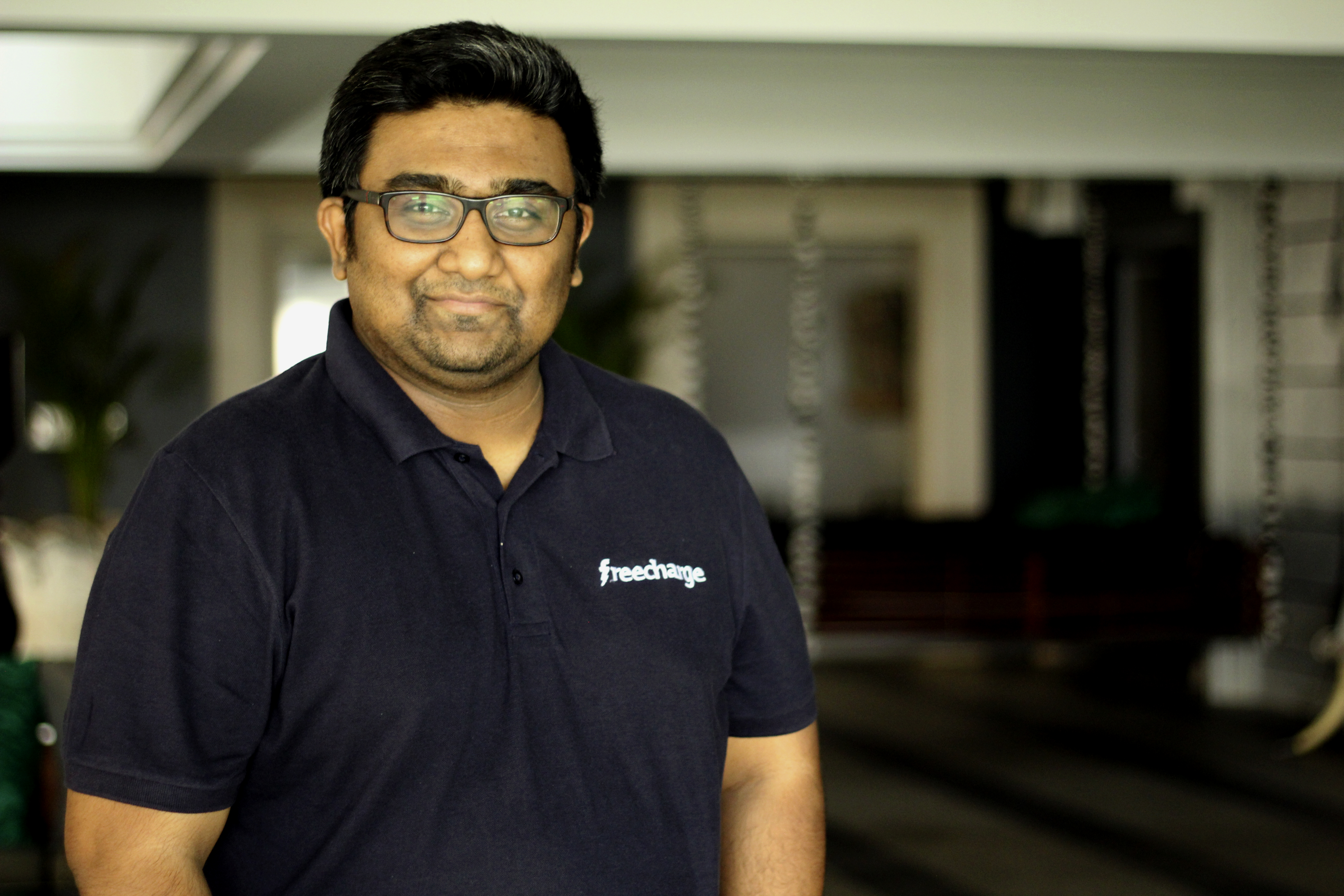
Kunal Shah, founder of Freecharge

Freecharge was founded in August 2010 by Kunal Shah and Sandeep Tandon. After receiving seed funding of an undisclosed amount from Tandon Group and Sequoia Capital in 2010, the company secured Series A funding of ₹20 million from Sequoia Capital in 2011. In November 2012, the company claimed to be doing online recharge of ₹6 million on a daily basis, translating to ₹2.19 billion a year.

In 2011, Freecharge was named one of the most promising technology startups from India by Pluggd.in.

On 1 September 2014, Freecharge received $33 Million Series B Funding from Sequoia Capital, Sofina and Ru-Net, which was one of the biggest fund raising by an Indian technology startup. On 6 February 2015, Freecharge further raised $80 million from Hong Kong–based fund Tybourne Capital Management and SF-based fund Valiant Capital Management and existing investors. Freecharge is building an advertising platform that will capture online and offline purchase behaviour and brand preferences of consumers, by offering incentives and discount coupons to users to transact on its platform.

On 8 April 2015, Indian e-commerce firm Snapdeal acquired Freecharge for ₹2800 crore (US$400 million) in cash and stock. In March 2017, Snapdeal announced Jason Kothari will be the new CEO of Freecharge. Snapdeal decided to invest $20 million into the same.

April 2016, FreeCharge rolls out Chat and Pay – feature in its app where merchants and customers can connect over chat and just initiate payments.

On 18 May 2017, Jasper Infotech, which owns and operates Freecharge, decided to invest ₹22 Crore more in the company, making it its third such investment.

On 27 July 2017, it was officially reported that Axis Bank bought out Freecharge for $60 million.

On 22 March 2017, Ankit Khanna was appointed as COO. Prior to this, Khanna was the chief product officer of the company.

March 30, 2018, FreeCharge enables BHIM UPI on its Digital Wallet platform.

Digital Credit Cards were introduced by Freecharge on 27 August 2019.

In December 2025, the National Company Law Tribunal (NCLT) approved a scheme of demerger transferring the business correspondent and technology services operations of Freecharge Payment Technologies to Freecharege Business and Technology Services Limited.
