= Kunal Shah =

Indian entrepreneur and angel investor (born 1979)

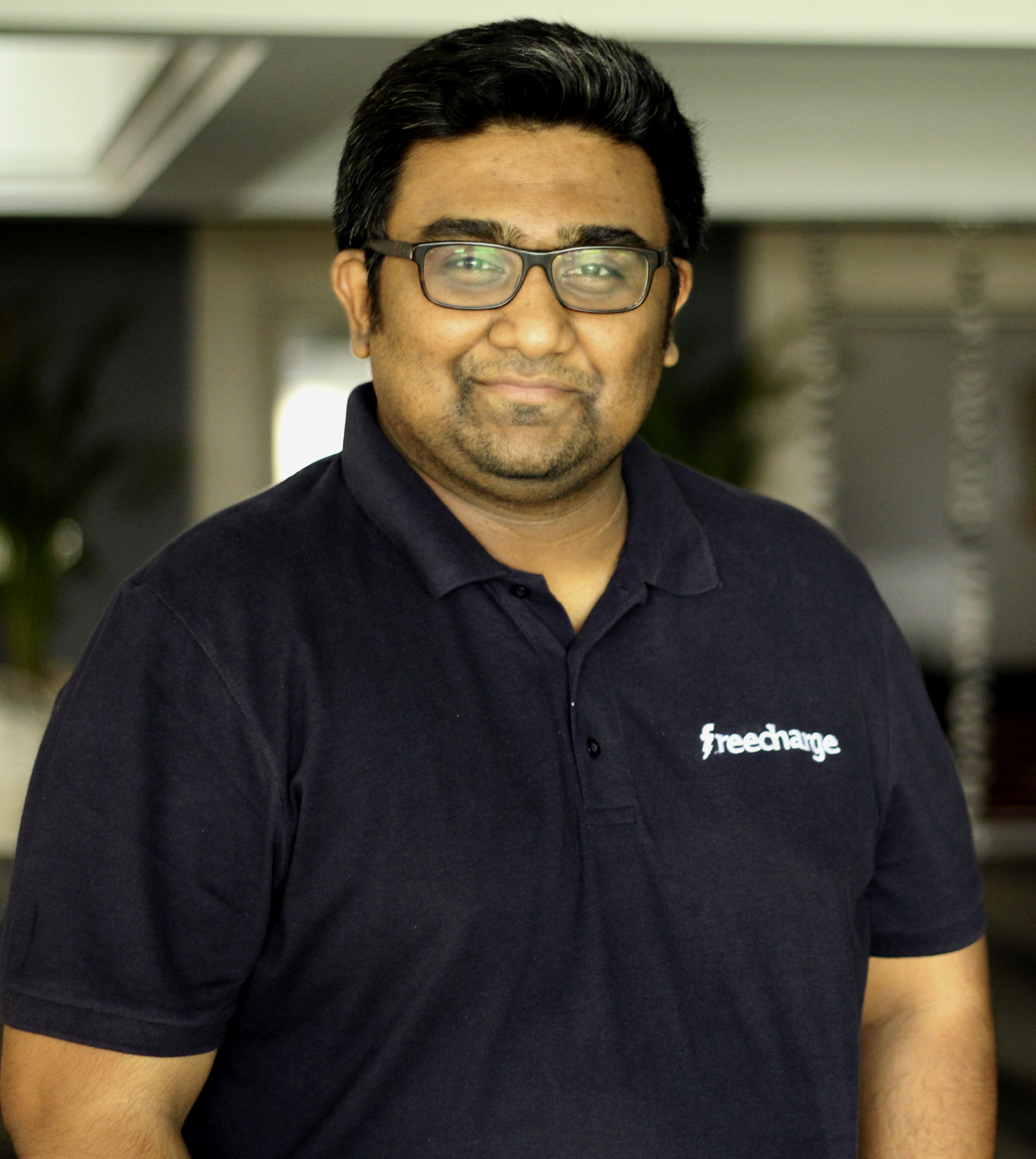
- Shah in 2015
- Born: 30 May 1979 (age 47)
- Education: Wilson College, Mumbai (BA); NMIMS, Mumbai (Dropout)
- Occupation: Entrepreneur
- Known for: Head of WhatsApp, Co-founding Freecharge and founding CRED

Kunal Shah (born 30 May 1979) is an Indian entrepreneur and angel investor. He currently serves as the head of WhatsApp. He co-founded the online recharge platform FreeCharge, which was acquired by Snapdeal in 2015. He later founded CRED, a members-only credit-card bill payment rewards platform.

== Early life and education ==
Shah studied philosophy at Wilson College in Mumbai. In interviews, he has said he started working in his teens while continuing his education and later enrolled in a part-time MBA programme at the Narsee Monjee Institute of Management Studies (NMIMS) before leaving the course in 2004.

== Career ==
Shah founded a cashback promotions company, PaisaBack, in 2009; he has described FreeCharge as having emerged from a pivot of that business model. He co-founded FreeCharge with Sandeep Tandon in 2010. In April 2015, Snapdeal announced the acquisition of FreeCharge in a cash-and-stock deal widely reported to be about ₹2,800 crore (roughly US$400–450 million).

Shah later founded CRED, a platform that enables users to pay credit-card bills and earn rewards; Mint has described it as a members-only service that uses credit scores to identify eligible users.

He succeeded Will Cathcart as the head of WhatsApp in June 2026.

== Angel investing and other activities ==
After selling FreeCharge, Shah became an active angel investor. In 2022, Mint reported that he was among India's most active angel investors by number of deals during the year. A 2021 Moneycontrol profile reported that he had made more than 200 angel investments, including stakes in fintech companies such as Razorpay and BharatPe.

Shah has served as an independent director of Syrma SGS Technology Limited.

== Recognition ==
Shah was featured in Fortune India's 40 Under 40 list (2016). In 2016, The Economic Times named him "Comeback Kid of the Year" at its Startup Awards (for FreeCharge).
