= Merbai Ardesir Vakil =

Indian physician (1868–1941)

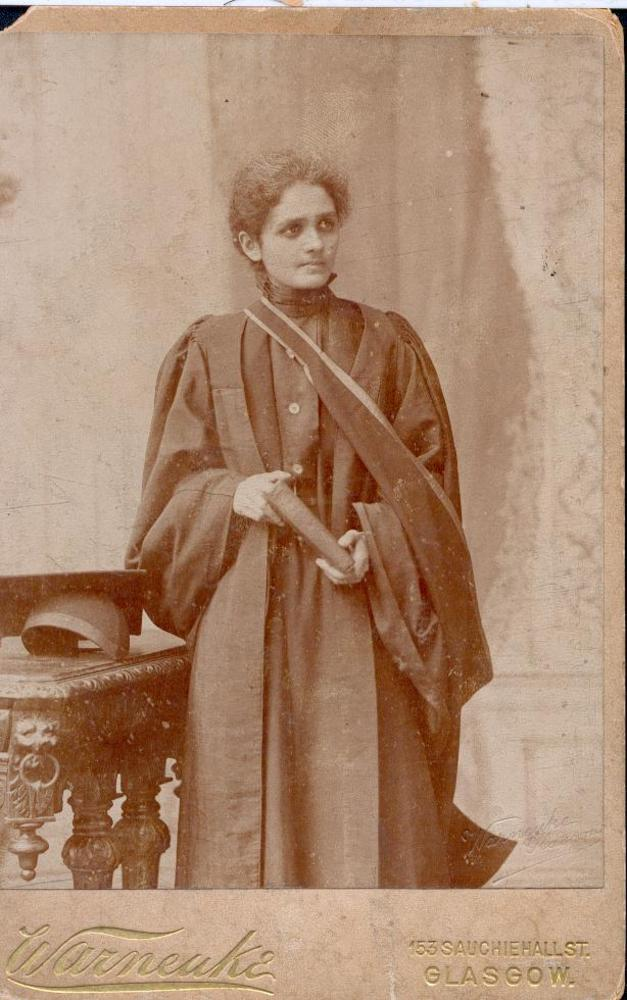
- Graduation picture of Vakil 1897
- Born: 25 May 1868; Bombay (Mumbai)
- Died: 9 April 1941 (age 72); Bombay (Mumbai)
- Occupation: physician
- Father: Ardesir Framji Vakil

Merbai Ardesir Vakil (25 May 1868 – 9 April 1941) was an Indian-Parsi physician and the first Asian woman to graduate from a Scottish university.

== Early life ==
Merbai Ardesir Vakil was born 25 May 1868 in Bombay (now known as Mumbai), the daughter of Ardesir Framji Vakil, a Parsi solicitor.

She attended Wilson High School, Bombay and then Wilson College, Bombay, graduating in 1888, the first woman to do so.

== Medical education ==
After attending Grant Medical College, Bombay, Vakil attended London School of Medicine for Women. In 1893, she moved to Queen Margaret College, Glasgow, graduating 22 July 1897 with the degree of MB ChB the first Asian woman to graduate from a university in Scotland. She then undertook two years of post graduate work in Glasgow.

== Medical practice ==
Vakil went on to work at the Cama Hospital for Women and Children, Bombay; the Plague Hospital in Byculla, Bombay; and the Cumoo Jaffer Suleman Dispensary, Kapadoiaas, as well as other hospitals and dispensaries. In March 1941 she moved to Aden, first working for the British government and then entering private practice.

== Death ==
In poor health, Vakil returned to Bombay in March 1941. She died on 9 April 1941.
