= Daji Bhatawadekar =

Indian theatre personality and film and television actor

- Born: 15 September 1921; Bombay, Bombay Presidency, India
- Died: 26 December 2006 (aged 85); Mumbai, Maharashtra, India
- Education: Wilson College, Mumbai
- Occupations: Theatre artist, Film actor
- Awards: Sangeet Natak Akademi Award (1965); Padma Sri (1967)

Daji Bhatawadekar (stage name for Krishnachandra Moreshwar) (15 September 1921 – 26 December 2006), was an Indian theatre personality and film and television actor. He was credited with the revival of Sanskrit and Marathi theatre in India. A winner of the Sangeet Natak Akademi award in 1965, he was honoured by the Government of India in 1967, with the award of Padma Shri, the fourth highest Indian civilian award for his contributions to the society.

== Early life and education ==
Daji Bhatwadekar was born on 15 September 1921 at Bombay in the then Bombay Presidency of British India. He received his schooling at Arya Education Society, Bombay. He graduated from Wilson College, Mumbai and followed it up with a post graduate degree (MA) in Sanskrit from Mumbai University. He started his career with an office job but was drawn towards theatre and began involving with Mumbai Marathi Sahitya Sangh, a Mumbai-based literary association.

== Career ==
Bhatwadekar acted in many Marathi, Sanskrit, Hindi and English language plays and was associated with actors such as Durga Khote and directors like Purushottam Laxman Deshpande and Herbert Marshall. He also performed for Mumbai Brahman Sabha. He was reported to have acted 78 different roles, some of them multiple times. Tochi ek Samarth, Mitra, Hee Tar Premachi Khari Gammat Ahe, Lagnachi Goshta, Macbeth and Tuzha Ahe Tuzhpashi are some of his well-known plays. He also acted in a film, Vijeta (1982). He played characters, Nand Dulal Babu in the episode Makdi ka Ras and Beni Madhav in the episode Veni Sanhar, for the television series, Byomkesh Bakshi (1993), broadcast by Doordarshan.

A scholar in English and Sanskrit, Bhatwadekar wrote a book on Sanskrit theatre, with emphasis on aesthetics (rasa) and expression (abhinaya). He pursued his studies into his 70s and secured a doctoral degree at the age of 74.

He lived in his ancestral home at Bhatawadekar Wadi along Charni Road in Mumbai. Mumbai Marathi Sahitya Sangh observes the date of his death, 26 December, as Dr. Daji Bhatawadekar Memorial day.

== Awards ==
He was a recipient of several awards such as Natya Bhooshan, Kala Guarav, Maharashtra Ratna and Nata Samraat. In 1965, he received the Sangeet Natak Akademi award for his contributions to Sanskrit theatre. The Government of India honoured him with the civilian award of Padma Shri in 1967.

== See also ==
- Purushottam Laxman Deshpande
- Herbert Marshall
- Durga Khote
