= Tybourne Capital Management =

Hong Kong investment firm

- Type: Private
- Industry: Investment Management
- Founded: 2012; 14 years ago
- Founders: Eashwar Krishnan; Tanvir Ghani
- Headquarters: AIA Central, Hong Kong
- AUM: US$8.6 billion (2021)
- Website: tybournecapital.com

Tybourne Capital Management (Tybourne) is a growth investment firm based in Hong Kong with an additional office in San Francisco. The firm makes investments in both public and private markets globally.

== Background ==
Tybourne was founded as a hedge fund in 2012 by Eashwar Krishnan and Tanvir Ghani. Krishnan was previously the Head of Asia at Lone Pine Capital. Ghani was previously a managing director of Prime brokerage at Hong Kong office of Goldman Sachs. Tybourne is considered part of the Tiger Cub group due to the firm being spun out from one. The flagship fund known as the Tybourne Equity Master Fund raised $500 million in its debut and employed a Long/short equity strategy. Later on it would also have a long-only fund.

Tybourne's flagship fund had a return of 16.04% and 12.70% in 2013 and 2015 respectively. In 2015, Tybourne was ranked as one of the largest hedge fund buyer of Alibaba American depositary receipts. From a report near the end of 2016 from Bloomberg News, the fund made money every year.

In 2019, Tybourne established the Tybourne Strategic Opportunities Fund which would invest in private companies. The University of Michigan committed $50 million to the fund.

In 2020, the Tybourne Equity Master Fund returned almost 53% after a successful COVID-19 strategy.

In May 2021, Tybourne established the Tybourne Strategic Opportunities Fund II. In July, the University of Michigan committed another $50 million to that fund.

In December 2021, Tybourne shut down its $2.8 billion flagship hedge fund and returned money to investors citing difficulties in profitability. The Fund declined by over 16% during 2021. The firm going forward would focus only on its long-only strategy and private investment funds.

In February 2025, Tybourne announced it would stop managing public market investments for clients and would focus only on private investments.

== Notable private investments ==
- Amylyx Pharmaceuticals
- Freecharge
- Paidy
- Snapdeal
