= Kuvera.in =

Indian Financial Services company

Kuvera
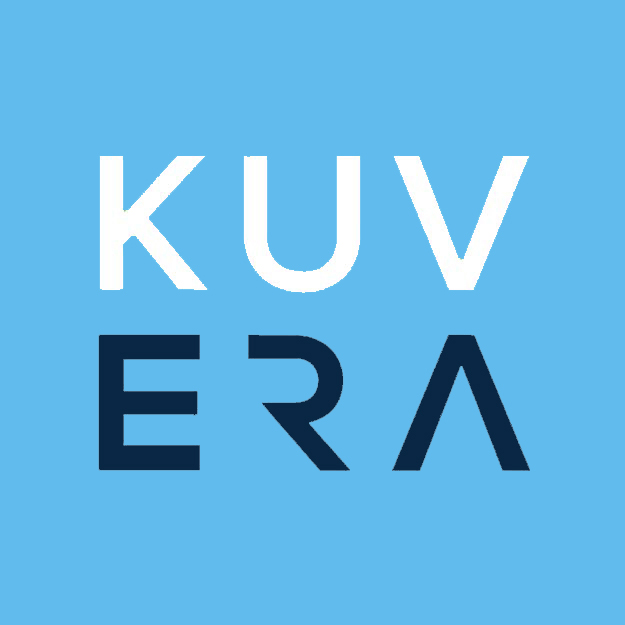
- Company type: Private
- Industry: Personal finance, financial services
- Founded: 2016
- Founder: Gaurav Rastogi, Neelabh Sanyal
- Fate: Acquired by CRED
- Headquarters: Bangalore, India
- Services: Direct Mutual Funds, Tax Harvesting, Smart Trading, Family Account
- AUM: ₹280 billion
- Owner: Cred
- Parent: Arevuk Advisory Services Pvt. Ltd.
- Website: https://kuvera.in

Kuvera is an Indian online wealth management platform for mutual funds, digital gold, fixed deposits, cryptocurrency exchange, insurance & US ETF investment. It is operated by Arevuk Advisory Services Pvt. Ltd., a company headquartered in Bangalore. In February 2024, Kuvera was acquired by Cred.

== History ==
Kuvera was founded in 2016 by Gaurav Rastogi - ex-portfolio manager at Morgan Stanley and Neelabh Sanyal - former vice-president with Axis Capital. Mayank Sharma, cloud architect at Amagi joined as the third co-founder in 2017, assuming the responsibility of head of technology.

Kuvera.in derives its name from Kuber (also called Kubera or Kuvera), the lord of riches and treasures according to Hindu mythology.

Kuvera's parent company, Arevuk Advisory Services Pvt. Ltd. registered as investment advisor (RIA) with SEBI (registration no INA200005166) on 19 July 2016

The website was launched in 2017. Over the course of the year, Kuvera introduced the robo-advisory tools on its platform.

Kuvera raised a total of $500,000 in two rounds of angel funding. In March 2018, it raised $250,000 in the second round of angel investment from Baskar Subramanian, co-founder, Amagi, Saket Kumar, managing director, Swank Capital among others.

In April 2019, Kuvera received a Series A investment of $4.5 Million from the lead investor Eight Roads Fintech Strategic Investments, the investment arm of Fidelity International for building the team and expanding the product portfolio.

The company also launched a group health insurance cover for its users underwritten by Bharti AXA that covers medical expenses.

Mayank Sharma, CTO left the company in February 2021.

In February 2024, Kuvera was acquired by fintech company Cred in a cash and stock deal to enter the wealth-management space.

== Partnership ==
In September 2020, the company established a partnership with Vested Finance to allow its Indian traders to invest in the US stocks including Netflix, Facebook, and Apple.

== See also ==
- Mutual funds in India
