= Wilson College, Mumbai =

College established in 1832 in Mumbai, India

Coordinates: 18.956308°N 72.810876°E

Wilson College
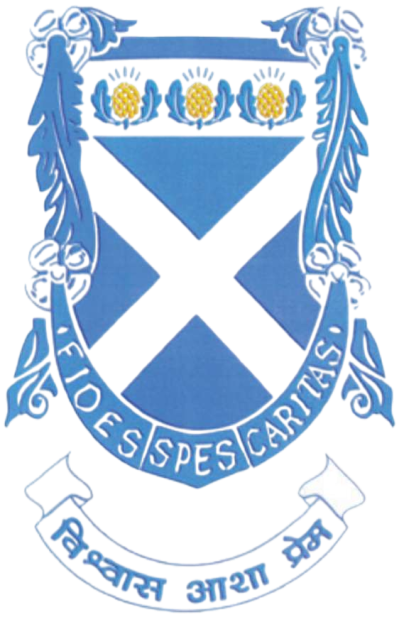
- The Wilson College at Girgaon Chowpatty, Mumbai
- Motto: Fides Spes Caritas
- Motto in English: Faith, Hope and Love
- Type: Public
- Established: 1832; 194 years ago
- Founder: Rev. John Wilson (Scottish missionary)
- Affiliations: University of Mumbai
- Chairman: Paritosh Canning
- Principal: Jamson Masih (In-charge)
- Location: Mumbai, Maharashtra, India
- Campus: Urban
- Colors
- Website: wilsoncollege.edu
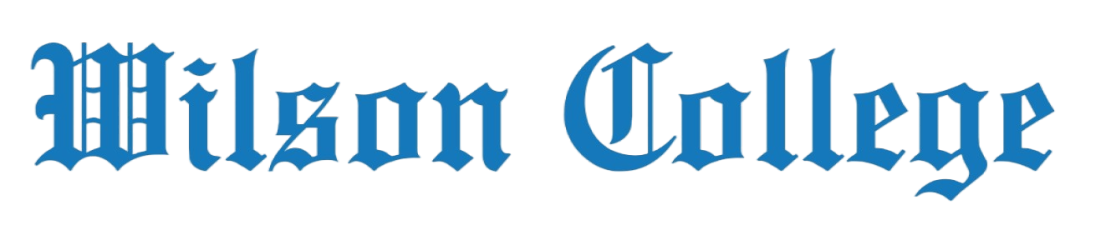

The Wilson College, established in 1832 in Mumbai, is one of India's oldest colleges; its foundation precedes that of the University of Mumbai, (to which it is affiliated), by 25 years. Wilson College was granted autonomy by Mumbai University in November 2021. It was awarded an A rating by the National Assessment and Accreditation Council (NAAC) in 2005.

Located opposite Mumbai's Girgaon Chowpatty, the college building was constructed in 1889 and designed by John Adams in the domestic Victorian Gothic style. It is listed as a Grade III heritage structure in the city. As of 2011, the college offered a variety of subjects for both higher secondary and undergraduate students which include University Aided courses for the Arts and the Sciences as well as self-financed courses such as Mass Media, Information Technology, Management Studies, Biotechnology, Electronics & Computer Science.

== History ==
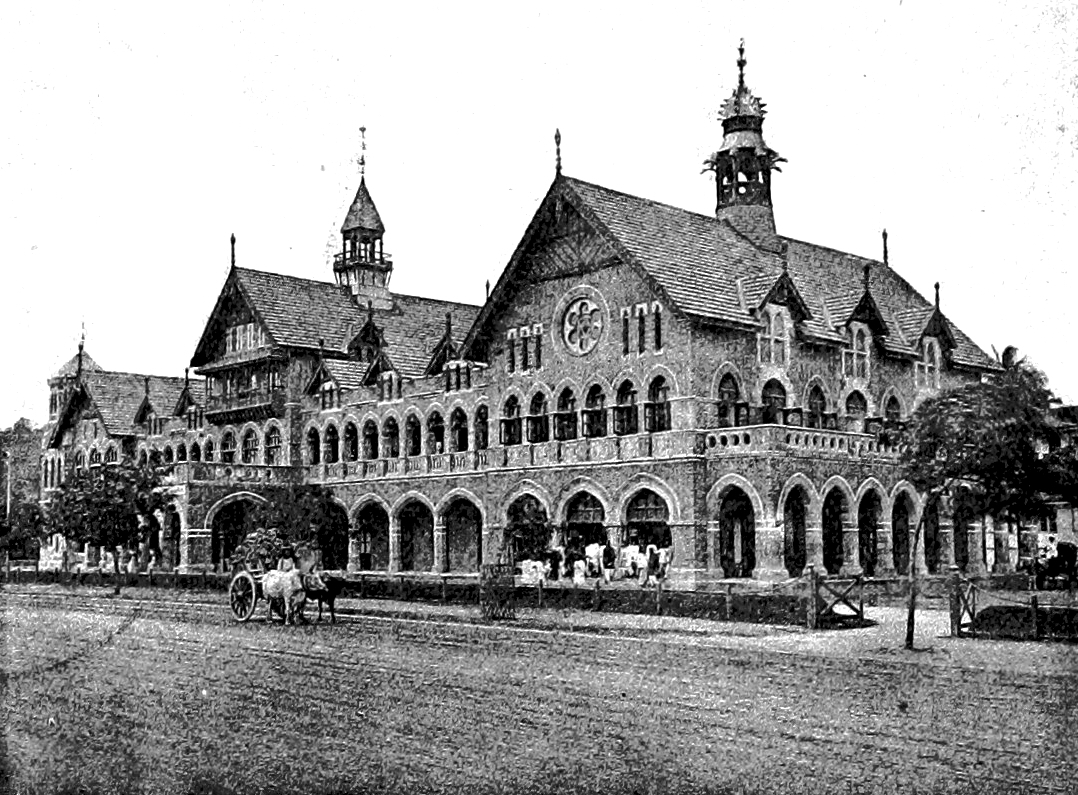
Wilson College, 1893

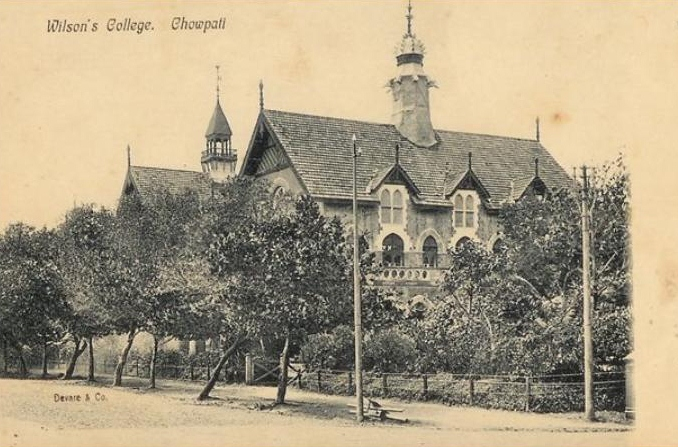
Wilson College (20th century)

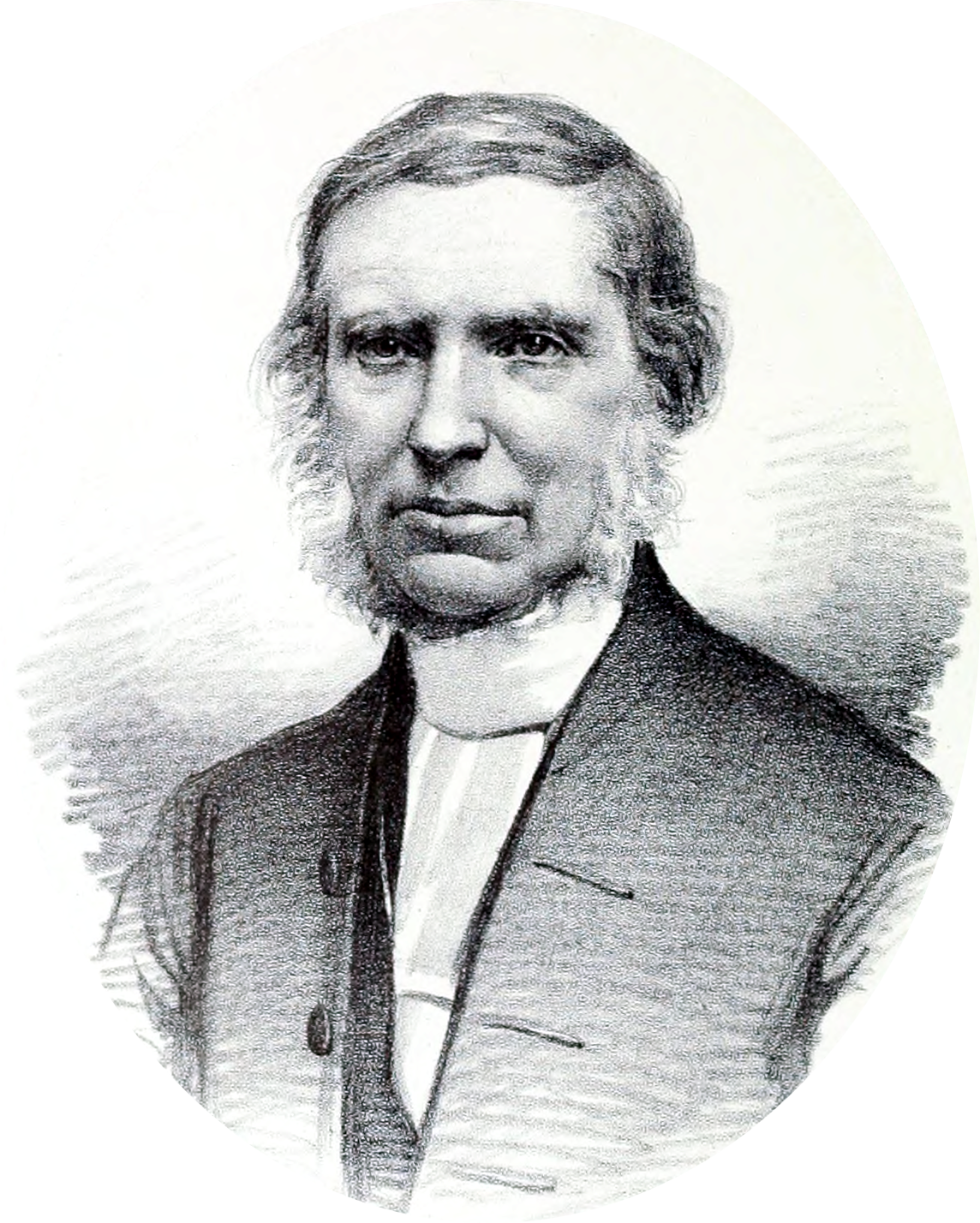
John Wilson from Disruption Worthies

The Wilson College was founded by the Scottish missionary Rev. John Wilson, in 1832. Beginning as Ambroli English School in Girgaum, Mumbai, it later saw several changes of sites and names, eventually being called the Wilson School. The collegiate section, from which Wilson College evolved, came about in 1836.

Soon after their arrival in Mumbai in February 1829, Wilson and his wife Margaret Wilson began studying the local language of Marathi. Margaret started a school for girls in 1829 at Ambroli House in Girgaum at Mumbai, with Marathi being the chief medium of instruction and learning. An English boarding school was opened in 1832, which later became the St. Columba School. The Ambroli English School is the direct forerunner of the present college.

On 14 December 1861, the collegiate section of Wilson's institution under the name of Free General Assembly's Institution became the first privately owned, non-government institution to be affiliated to the university. In 1952, the management of the college came under an autonomous Board of Governors in India. Since 1963, the college functions under the management of John Wilson Education Society. Wilson College is a Christian minority institution and is closely related to CNI. It aims at education of the Christian community and extends its facilities and services to other communities too.

The students of Wilson College are from nearly every ethnic, religious and social group, of the country as well as of the world.

The motto of the college is "Fides, Spes, Caritas" (Vishwas, Asha, Prem) — Faith (in God), Hope (that the college can achieve the highest level of moral, spiritual and intellectual excellence, and love that steers one through life).

After the death of Dr. Wilson in 1875, Rev Dr Dugald Mackichan served as a successor, having already served the college for six months at the time of Wilson's death. Nine years later, Mackichan became principal and held the position until 1920, becoming one of the most distinguished principals of the college. Mackichan, who taught physics and was instrumental for setting up the college's physics laboratory, was a distinguished physicist in his own right and had formerly worked with British scientist Lord Kelvin.

The Postal Department, Government of India honoured its founder and the institution by issuing a Special Day Postal Cover in 2004. In 2007 to commemorate the completion of its 175 years, a stamp and first day cover of Wilson College was issued.

== The Wilsonian ==
The Wilsonian, the annual magazine publication of Wilson College, was first printed and published from Pune by the Scottish Mission Industries Co. Ltd. on behalf of the Wilson College Literary Society with the first issue appearing in 1909.

The names of the editors do not appear until 1933. The Wilsonian was published twice a year from 1909 until 1944, when it was decided to publish it only once a year. The Wilsonian has been an annual publication ever since. Launching its debut issue, the motto of The Wilsonian was:

Be thou the bond to bind in love and peace

Wilsonians all that are

And were, and are to be

== Architecture ==
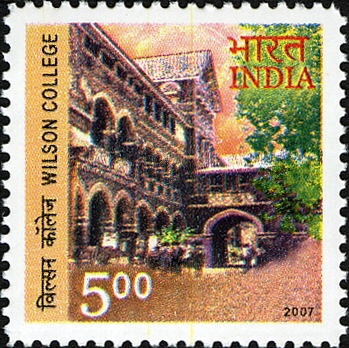
Wilson College on a 2007 stamp of India

The building has first-floor classrooms with teakwood trusses. These classrooms are protected by deep verandahs, which overlook the Girgaum Chowpatty beach and are protected by the Mangalore tiled roof.

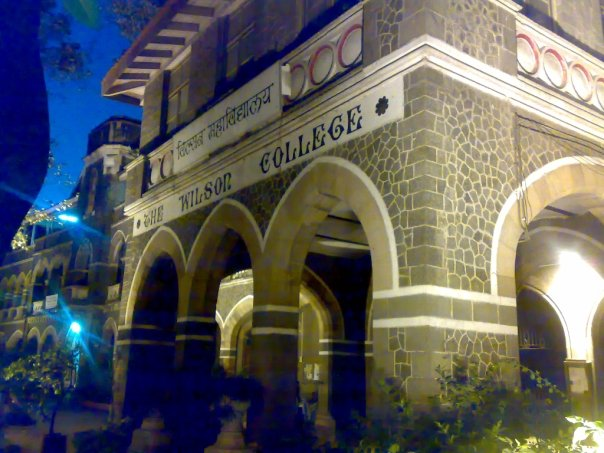
The college at night

The arched veranda with its segmental sandstone arches on the ground floor forms one of the common features of the building. The deep over-hanging verandahs on the west façade facing the sea form a buffer between the classrooms and the exteriors. They bear the brunt of the heavy rains and the sunlight.

As seen in most of the buildings in that period, Minton tiles have been used for the college verandah flooring. The main staircase area has some mosaic tile decoration with floral motifs. The use of red terracotta tiles in the first floor and the second floor makes the floor look different and these are in a relatively good condition. Many original teakwood doors and windows still exist in the college.

The entrance lobby with its grand staircase is one of the features in all the buildings designed by John Adams. The grand timber staircase with the multi-foil circular panel design in the handrail is another feature extensively used by John Adams in his design. The classrooms have been designed north–south opening into the west verandah. They have ample windows for ventilation and natural light.

The library, with its teakwood mezzanines and catwalks, is one of the best-maintained areas in the college. The teakwood mezzanines are the extra reading and storage areas in the library – the library furniture has been designed keeping in mind the exact space provision for the storage. The library is divided into bays, which are partitioned with the storage cupboards.

The assembly hall is designed with two level balconies, which were designed to accommodate an orchestra for important functions. The teakwood balcony is supported on the teakwood decorative brackets. There is a multi-foil circular stained glass window with the college crest on it.

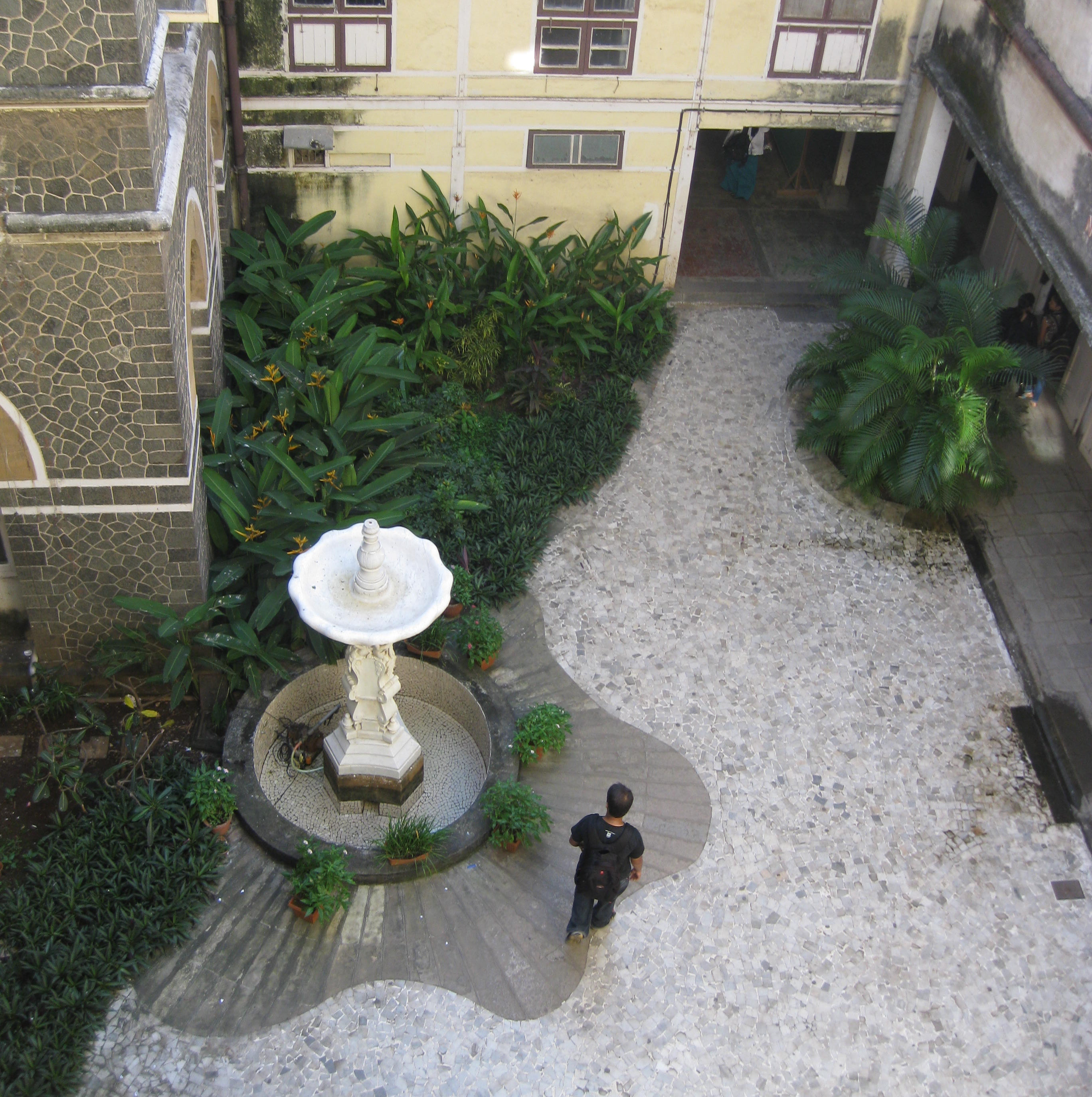
An over head view of the white marble courtyard Fountain in the college interiors.

The chapel is placed in the north-west corner of the building. The central nave with its arches and the columns has been designed with good acoustics. Each bay of the nave and the side isle has the original lamp fittings illuminating the chapel.

The white marble courtyard fountain is renaissance revival fountain based on one of the famous designs of the famous Italian sculptor Gianlo Renzo Bernini. The fountain is a 3-piece sculptor and is a garden ornament fountain, an order from the catalogue, which was a typical feature in the 19th century. The sculpture depicts the scroll motifs and the long tresses of hair representing the water and river sea nymphs. Fish motifs can also be seen in the hands of the sea nymphs.

== Facilities ==
=== Library ===
The Wilson College Library was established in 1832. At present it holds approximately 73,000 books and has a staff ch contains information about the location of books. Students can find the books if they enter the name of the author, the book or the theme. The library can accommodate more than 100 students at a time.

The Reference Section extends to the old hall and contains a wide range of books such as encyclopaedias, world books, dictionaries, thesaurus, competitive exam digests, books on history, etc., theses and dissertations, mini displays, magazines and newspapers are also a part of the reference section. The library has taken annual membership with N LIST to access E-resources.

The library also has a rare book section which includes books such as Commentary of Newton's Principia, Minute Book – Dr. Machichan's Signature, Italian–English Dictionary-1829, Madras Christian College Magazine 1890–91, The Holy Bible −1610 A.D., A Sanskrit-English Dictionary by Monier Williams-1872 and Dictionary of English Language-VOL.II-Samuel Johnson-1773. The library also has a digitalised collection and microfilms of Old Gujarati books. It offers immediate access of books to those pursuing a MA, MSC and PhD and offers open access to staff and students. It also issues books to alumni and retired teachers.

=== Hostels ===
The Wilson College runs three hostels to provide accommodation for its students.

St. Andrew's House is one of the two boys' hostels run by the college, and was established in 1961.

There are 21 double rooms and 11 single rooms in the hostel. Since 1984, St. Andrews House has organised an annual mini-marathon. Sandathon is an exclusive inter-hostel road race for undergraduate residents of the hostel.

Since 2004, this marathon has become open to other college students from Mumbai. The hostel regularly publishes newsletters (Sandy News) and magazines (Sandy Vision). The hostel is also wi-fi enabled. Mackichan Hall, named after Dr Dugald Mackichan (Principal of the college from 1884 to 1920) is the other boys’ hostel run by Wilson College. There are 46 single rooms and 12 sharing rooms in the hostel.

Pandita Ramabai Hostel (PRH), the girls’ hostel of Wilson College was established in 1932. The hostel conducts an annual ‘Fresher’s Night’ where the new residents come together and perform for other residents of the hostel. PRH also has a tradition where residents send anonymous gifts to fellow residents at Christmas, with the names being revealed on Christmas Eve.

=== Chapel ===
The Wilson College Chapel is open during the college hours for private prayer and meditation. Short prayer services that include Hymns and Bible reading are conducted every day during the morning and the afternoon recess in the chapel.

The chapel organises a festival called the "Chapel-O-Fiesta" with games and events. It also organises various YMCA camps in Maharashtra. The chapel also has a choir which stood won the intercollegiate carol singing competition at Sophia College in 2010.

The 75th jubilee of the chapel occurred in 2010.

=== The Andrew’s Vision Centre ===
The Andrew's Vision Centre popularly known as the AVC came into existence in 2008. The residents of the Saint Andrew's House supported the initiative and raised funds for the establishment of the AVC through Sandyfest, a special festival which was conducted by the Saint Andrew's House. The motto of the Andrew's Vision Center is "To help visually challenged students to be educationally, technologically, psychologically and socially enriched so that they are better equipped to face the challenges of life"

The Andrew's Vision Centre is sponsored and supported by the Rolta Foundation, alumni and the well-wishers of the hostel. The AVC provides a platform for visually impaired students to study in and is located near the Audio Visual room of the college. The center is open from 9 am to 4 pm.

'NVDA’ and ‘JAWS’ are the software used by the students to scan and read their notes. ‘Talking typing teacher’ is also used to help students improve their communication skills, English grammar and to learn new words in the English language.

The volunteers associated with the centre record notes for the students. It also provides general knowledge books in Braille and textbooks and notes of Standard 12 (Maharashtra Board) in Braille for the students. The centre also has books and notes of different subjects which can be accessed and read by the students with the special software called ‘Dazy’.

The AVC at present has 24 visually challenged students. The students of the centre represent the Wilson College in different competitions conducted by various colleges in Mumbai. The students also participated in an exhibition match for the visually challenged students which is organised by Saint Andrew's House. The Wilson College Blind Football Team was formed in the early days of 2017. They acquired an impressive victory over the rest of Mumbai teams and went on to play in the National Blind Football Match held in Cochin, Kerala. The AVC students actively participate in all college activities and events.

'Third Eye' is the annual event conducted by the Andrew's Vision Center, conducted usually during December, it is a platform where the visually challenged students showcase their talents in different areas like sports, gymnastics, cultural events etc. It attracts a huge crowd every year and is a major event in the college. Real Eye, is a cricket match first hosted in 2008 for the visually challenged students. AVC students regularly takes part in career workshops, theatrical workshops etc., Collaborations with the National Association for the Blind and Thomas Cook Center of learning and management.

The AVC uses many instruments, to help the students to learn. Some instruments used are Angel recorders, Braille Typewriter, Braille Stensils etc.

=== Civil Service Study Centre ===
The Civil Service Study Centre is located in the Saint Andrew's House and provides a platform for those students of Wilson College whose interest lies in joining the Indian Administrative Service (IAS) and Indian Police Service (IPS).

The Civil Service Study Centre periodically organises discussions and debates for the students on general topics. The students are divided into groups and are given weekly assignments based on a particular theme. The centre is a platform where weekly tests are conducted for the students to get acquainted with the papers of the UPSC and MPSC examinations.

The Civil Service Study Centre with the grant from the University Grant's Commission (UCG) acquired over 1000 books which are useful for the preparations for the Union Public Service Commission examinations (UPSC) and Maharashtra Service Public Commission (MPSC) examinations.

There are books on varied subjects including general studies, history, sociology, political science and economics in addition to atlases and maps. The centre also subscribes to magazines like ‘Pratyogita Darpan’, ‘Competition Wizard’ and ‘Competition Success’. In addition, weeklies and dailies like Tehelka, India Today, The Week and Frontline, The Hindu and The Indian Express are available for reference.

=== Political Science Association ===
The Political Science Association was formed in 1991–92 by the Political Science department of Wilson College.

In August 1992, the association organised an exhibition of 15 political systems in the world. Countries like USA, USSR, UK, France, Switzerland, India, her neighbours and some African countries were included. The exhibition received wide press coverage and was also exhibited in Mantralaya in February 1992. The same year some members of the association also paid a visit to Maharashtra Legislative Assembly.

In the year 1994–95, the association's magazine ‘The Voice’ was launched during Political Science fest. Efforts were made to revive the Political Science Association in 2003–04 but, circumstances and inertia came in the way of activities. It gained a whole new momentum in the year 2010. The association is planning to organise staff-student debates, elocution and talks with eminent speakers, writers and editors. In 2011, Vaibhav Purandare, journalist at Hindustan Times and author of The Sena Story visited the college and spoke to the students about corruption, politics and other current issues. The members are taking initiatives to republish the yearly magazine. The membership of the association is open to all students of Wilson College with a membership fee of Rs 30.

=== Wilson Gymkhana ===
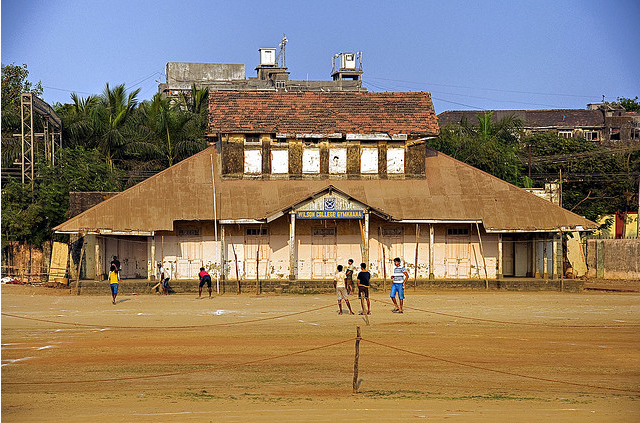
The Wilson College Gymkhana, one of the oldest in the city, provides many sports facilities for students.

Wilson College has its own Gymkhana, with a wide range of facilities for indoor and outdoor sports. These include Athletics, Football, Cricket, Rugby, Hockey, Badminton, Weight Lifting, Boxing, Gymnastics, Table Tennis, Carrom, Chess etc. Founded by former principal, Dr. Dugald Mackichan on 17 March 1910 it is located on Marine Drive alongside popular Gymkhanas like the Hindu Gymkhana and Islam Gymkhana.

During its initial years, two tennis courts situated side by side and a cricket pitch in the center were prepared. Tennis and Cricket were the two most popular outdoor games at the time. However, a need for a pavilion building was urgently felt and efforts were made in that direction. Sir Shapurji Bharucha played a major role in the process, donating INR 10,000/- to meet the cost of construction.

The new pavilion building was opened by Lord Willingdon, former governor of Bombay, on 20 December 1916. Since then, sporting activities of the college have expanded immensely, with the school producing sportspersons at state, national and even international level.

Apart from conventional sports, the college delved into less popular sports like Rugby, Water Polo and Yachting. Rugby was introduced in 1970 by former chemistry professor, Dr. James Barton.

Former Indian Cricketer, Dilip Sardesai; Woman International Master in Chess, Rohini Khadilkar and Arjuna Awardee for proficiency in Yachting, Jeejee Unwalla have all been affiliated to the Wilson College Gymkhana.

On 7 November 1985, former governor of Maharashtra, Kona Prabhakara Rao was quoted saying "In a city like Bombay, provision of sports facilities side by side with education is something which very few colleges can boast of. In this respect, Wilson College, one of the oldest colleges in the city, has been singularly fortunate. They have a Gymkhana which provides excellent sports facilities to their students."

=== National Service Scheme ===
Revived in 2001 and guided under the norms of the University of Mumbai, the National Service Scheme (NSS) group of Wilson College forms a part of Independence Day celebration in New Delhi. The volunteers enrolled work as a team on projects of social relevance for two consecutive years. The wing works for the welfare of mentally challenged and the under-privileged children with the assistance of NGOs. Teaching in municipal schools, participating in awareness rallies organised by the university are some of the many activities conducted by NSS. The NSS plays a vital role in conducting blood donation drives in the college twice every year. This has been highly acknowledged by the Blood Bank. Students are sent for Leadership Training Programs. An NSS camp is conducted for a period of 10 days every year where students are involved in projects of social relevance.

=== Co-operative Education Program ===
Unique to Wilson college, the first Co-operative Education Programme (CEP) was conducted in 1979–80. It is a special programme for SYBsc and SYBA students, which aims at training them to cope with the corporate world and guiding them to meet the expectations in corporate service. It is planned in consultation with experts from renowned industrial background and heads of departments in the college. It is a six weeks programme which is divided into two parts:

For the first three weeks, students are exposed to debates, discussions, talks by experts from various career backgrounds and workshops on personality and leadership development. For the next three weeks, students are offered internship in various organisations.

=== The Counselling Centre ===
The Wilson College was one of the first colleges under the Mumbai University to set up a counselling centre as early as 1978.

The centre was established as a joint project of the Sophia-Wilson Community. After being rendered defunct in 2000, it was revived in 2003 with the Xavier's Institute of Counselling Psychology at St. Xavier's College in Mumbai. This partnership lasted for two years, after which the college Counselling Centre began operating independently in 2005. The centre offers support for students dealing with emotional and psychological stressors, peer and parental pressures, identity issues, and interpersonal relationships.

=== The Wilson College Nature Club (WCNC) ===
The Wilson College Nature Club is affiliated with the Nature Club movement of the World Wide Fund for Nature–India (WWF), is one of the most active college-level nature conservation bodies in India.

It was founded 1979 under the initiative of students Farhan Thakur and Shubhada Kalyani, with Prof. B. D. Vakharia of the BOTANY department. A. J. Borde, the then principal of the college, sanctioned the club after realising the need for a body that could organise nature trails and excursions for students of faculties other than Botany and Zoology, who undertook these trails for academic purposes.

With "the quest for sensible, greener options" as its motto, the major activities of the WCNC include conducting nature trails to wilderness areas in Mumbai, usually from July to January, organising overnight treks on the weekends to biodiversity hotspots around Mumbai and 7- to 14-day nature camps to noteworthy national parks and wildlife sanctuaries in India. The WCNC camps are popular among students and alumni for their wide range of activities and experiences. The camps involve treks, sessions on conservation, clean-up sessions, interaction with wildlife officials and even workshops. A feature of WCNC camps is its tradition of using music to create awareness and spread the message of conservation. Songs like "And You Say the Battle is Over" by John Denver, "Garbage" by Pete Seger, "Blowin' in the Wind" by Bob Dylan and "Don’t Go Near the Water" by Johnny Cash rank high on the club playlist.

The central idea behind these camps is to create awareness about environmental issues and to better understand the culture and traditions of the places visited. The WCNC holds the distinction of traversing through its camps the northern-, eastern- and southernmost corners of India between 2005 and 2010 alone.

Camp fees are highly subsidised to enable students of all economic backgrounds to attend and, at times, free-ships are awarded to deserving students. Another significant feature of these camps is that they are organised entirely by the staff and students. Conservation activities of the club include organising tree plantation projects, snake shows for students, developing educational material and an annual theme-based exhibition, which runs under the initiative of active WCNC members and is supported by student volunteers from across the college.

The WCNC is also known for its library, which was set up through the efforts of Prof. Vakharia. The library has an extensive collection of old issues of National Geographic magazine, the Sanctuary Asia magazine and encyclopaedias on flora and fauna.

On its 30th anniversary, the WCNC published a book titled Wilson College Nature Club: A Journey Through Three Decades, chronicling the memories and experiences of students, alumni, staff and well-wishers associated with the WCNC over the course of the past 30 years. Footprint, the WCNC's monthly magazine, is the longest running publication of the club. The WCNC had formed a body exclusively for its alumni in 1981 called the Naturalia Wilsonica, which enabled and encouraged ex-students to continue visiting the wilderness. The body, however, could not be sustained post 1987.

=== Wilson College Student Council ===
Student Council was initiated way back in 1900 as a literary society. Now it is represented by top- ranking students from each class who play an active role in organising a number of student centric activities like intra-class competitions, workshops, celebration of college day and Teacher's day, orientation programs, etc. It is guided by the norms set by the university. The Principal, a staff advisor, Dean of students, Dean of Women students, NSS Program officer, Toppers, Cultural Centre student representative, Gymkhana student representative, NSS student representative, 2 women student representatives form an integral part of the council. It also takes a number of initiatives all round the year in coalition with Cultural Centre and Women's Development Cell.

The Wilson College Student Council provides the main forum for discussing student concerns and ideas. The Wilson College Student Council is responsible for representing and serving the needs of the student body through coordinating student activities and charity fundraisers and holding weekly meetings.

The Mission of the Students' Council is as follows:

- To coordinate and encourage all student activities within the scope of Wilson college Student Council.
- To work with the administration in all matters affecting the welfare of the student body.
- To stimulate and develop good citizenship and democracy among students.
- To encourage social development through participation in campus life.
- To encourage leadership through service.

== Unaided courses ==
Wilson College offers five unaided or professional undergraduate degree courses viz. Bachelor of Mass Media (BMM), Bachelor of Management Studies (BMS), Bachelor of Science (BSc) in Computer Science, Bachelor of Science in Biotechnology and Bachelor of Science in Information Technology (IT).

== Festivals ==
=== Meraki ===
Meraki is an inter-collegiate festival that takes place during the month of December or January over a course of two days. It conducts various competitions such as group dance, football and cricket, rangoli and mehendi making and singing. It is primarily organised by the NSS, the student council and the cultural centre. Meraki acts as an ice breaker for the new students of the Junior College and looks to integrate and build confidence among them. Over 500 students participate in the festival from all sections of the college.

=== Polaris ===
Polaris is the oldest mass media festival in Mumbai, dating back to 2001 and takes place in July every year. It is also the first inter-collegiate festival in the academic year. Polaris derives its name from ‘The Pole Star’ and aims to set the standard for the festivals that follow. The mascot of Polaris is Polly the Purple Cow. Each year, Polaris hosts about 50 colleges from across Mumbai.

=== Adorea ===
Adorea is an inter-collegiate BMS festival that takes place during the month of August. Adorea conducts events that range from sports to cultural events such as solo dance, a band event and a DJ night. Over 28 colleges from across Mumbai participate in the four-day festival.

=== Rainbow ===
The students of Wilson College along with the help of some faculty members started a programme called "Rainbow" in 1997. It started as a small social gathering that is now an annual event marked with great pride and enthusiasm by the students. Rainbow represents the seven sister states, Arunachal Pradesh, Assam, Manipur, Meghalaya, Mizoram, Nagaland, Tripura and also Sikkim.

The first Rainbow festival was held in 1999. It showcased traditional dances, the Manipuri dance and the famous Mizo bamboo dance, which was accompanied by English contemporary rock songs. And the most successful Rainbow festival was "Rainbow 2002", the festival spanned for three days. "Rainbow 2002" had an exhibition of exquisite crafted handicrafts beaded jewellery, artefacts like cutlery baskets and knick-knack crafted from bamboo, brightly assorted shawls and assorted garments. There was also screenings of two documentaries: "Mizorams Freedom Struggle", "The dying culture of Meghalaya" and a film "Adayja" (The Fight), a movie that won the prestigious Silver Peacock award. A fashion show with the different attires of the North-East along with popular dance like the Manipuri dance, the famous Mizo bamboo dance and the Assamese Bihu dance. Also, cultural and traditional music were performed along with rock anthems.

=== Backslash ===
Backslash is an inter-collegiate IT fest. Backslash conducts a number of technical events along with sports and cultural events. The first fest was on 5 and 6 February 2019. The theme of that year was "Sone ki chidiya, Social Media" expressing the impact of social media can have on anyone's life.

== Notable alumni ==
Wilson College has been home to a number of famous people including writers, scholars, freedom fighters, politicians, businessmen, sportspersons, artists etc.

Some of the college's eminent alumni, referred to as 'Wilsonians' include:

- Alice Maude Sorabji Pennell (1874 - 1951); 1st Indian woman to gain a Science degree.
- Abdullah Yusuf Ali (1872 - 1953); Barrister and Islamic Scholar.
- Shapurji Edalji (1841 - 1918); 1st South Asian person to be made the vicar of an English parish.
- Morarji Desai (1896 - 1995); 4th Prime Minister of India
- Nissim Ezekiel (1924 - 2004); Poet, Playwright and Art-critic.
- B. G. Kher (1888 - 1957); 1st Chief Minister of Bombay State.
- Dilip Sardesai (1940 - 2007); former Indian Test Cricketer.
- Pankaj Udhas (1951 - 2024); famous Ghazal singer.
- Chandralekha (1928 - 2006); Indian dancer and choreographer.
- R. B. Naik (1904 - 1970); Politician.
- Asoka Mehta (1911 - 1984); Indian Freedom Fighter.
- Shubha Khote (Born 1940); Actress.
- Nachiket Mor (Born 1960); member of the Central Board of the Reserve Bank of India & Chairman of the board of directors of CARE India.
- B. K. Karanjia (1912 - 2008); Indian film journalist and editor
- Russi Karanjia (1912 - 2008); Indian journalist and editor & founder of the Blitz.
- Julio Ribeiro (Born 1929); retd. Indian police officer and civil servant & Padma Bhushan Awardee.
- Tehemton Erach Udwadia (Born 1934); Gastroenterologist, Dr. B. C. Roy Award (2000), Padma Shri (2006), Order of the British Empire (2006).
- Mohanlal Lallubhai Dantwala (1909 - 1998); Agricultural economist, writer, Padma Bhushan winner.
- Tryambak Shankar Shejwalkar (1895 - 1963); famous Indian Historian & Essayist.
- Vijayray Vaidya (1897 - 1974); Gujarati literary critic.
- Daji Bhatawadekar, (Born 1921); Indian stage actor and Padma Shri Awardee.
- Malavika Mohanan (Born 1991); Actress in the Bollywood and South Indian Film Industry.
- Ramnarayan V. Pathak (1887 - 1955); Gujarati language author, prosodist and literary critic.
- Merbai Ardesir Vakil (1868 - 1941); Indian physician, first woman to graduate from Wilson College, and the first Asian woman to graduate from a Scottish university.
- Sunil Lahri (Born 1961); Indian actor.
- Uttambhai Nathalal Mehta (1924 - 1998); Indian businessman and the founder-chairman of Torrent Group of companies.
- Adline Castelino (Born 1998); Indian model and beauty pageant titleholder.
- Kunal Shah (Born 1979); Head of WhatsApp, and the former CEO of CRED.

== Notable Staff ==
- Alexander Robert Normand FRSE (1880–1957); Professor of Chemistry from 1934 to 1946.
- Tribhuvandas Kalyandas Gajjar (1863–1920); Professor of Chemistry
