= Margaret Bayne Wilson =

British missionary to schools in India (1775–1835)

Margaret Bayne Wilson (1795-1835) was a Scottish missionary, linguist and educator in India. The wife of fellow Church of Scotland missionary John Wilson, she established several schools in India, including the first girls' boarding school in western India, now called St. Columba High School.

== Life ==
Margaret Bayne was born on 5 November 1795 in Greenock. Her sisters Anna and Hay Bayne would later continue her educational work in India after her death.

In 1828 she married John Wilson, and in 1829 they sailed to India together. She established several schools in India, training teachers for them.

She died on 19 April 1835 in India. Her husband published a memoir of her in 1840, including extracts from her letters and journals.
