= John Wilson (Scottish missionary) =

19th-century Christian missionary, orientalist, and educator in India

The Very Reverend John Wilson DD, FRS
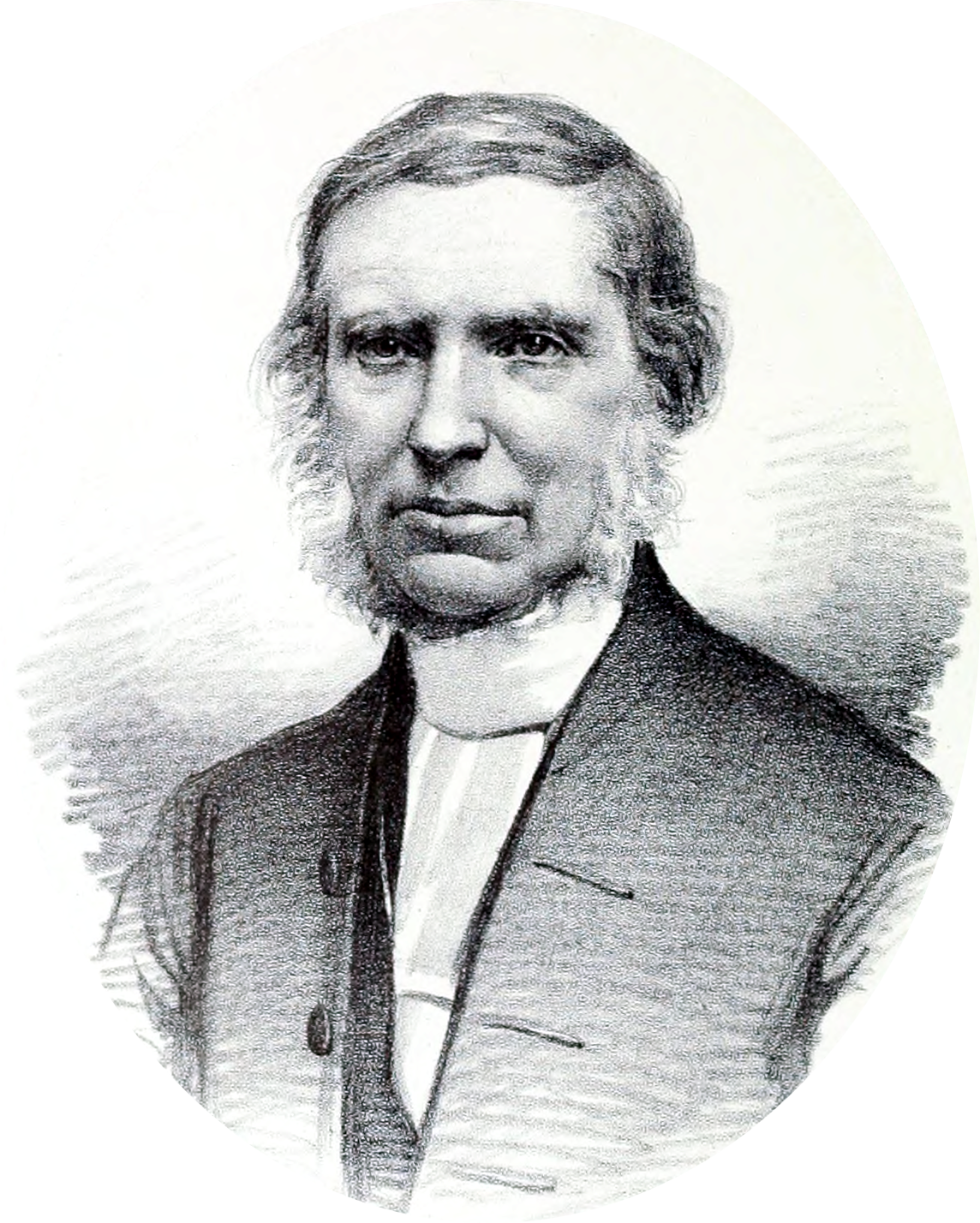
- John Wilson, Missionary and Orientalist
- Church: Protestant (Church of Scotland; Free Church of Scotland)

Personal details
- Born: 11 December 1804 Lauder, Berwickshire, Scotland
- Died: 1 December 1875 (aged 70) Bombay, Bombay Presidency
- Denomination: Christian
- Parents: Andrew Wilson, Janet Hunter
- Education: University of Edinburgh

John Wilson FRS (11 December 1804 – 1 December 1875) was a Scottish Christian missionary, orientalist, ethnographer, and Christian minister. He was the member of The Royal Society of London for Improving Natural Knowledge.

He was elected Moderator of the Free Church of Scotland in 1870.

== Early life and influence of Christianity ==
John Wilson was born in Lauder on 11 December 1804, the eldest of four brothers and three sisters, and grew up in a farming family.

His father, Andrew Wilson was a councilor of the burgh for over forty years and represented the parish church as an elder.

The family grew up in Lauder on a hill farm sprawled across seventeen hundred acres (1700 acres).

In school he was considered 'the priest' on the playground because was often seen preaching to his classmates. His being advanced for his age sometimes caused him trouble, and his preaching was sometimes seen as an offence.

== Education ==
As a child Wilson revealed that he was more intelligent than his siblings, learning to walk and talk at an early age.

When Wilson was four, he started at a school in Lauder, taught by a George Murray. He was only there for a year before he was moved to a parish school to be taught by Roman Catholic bishop Alexander Paterson under whom he progressed in his spiritual life. Mr. Paterson affected not only his students' spiritually but also the community.

He left school at the age of fourteen, the standard end of school in Scotland in the 19th century.

From 1819 he attended the University of Edinburgh, where he studied linguistics, philosophy and theology for eight years, and also mastered the languages of Gujarati, Hebrew, Greek, Latin, Urdu, Hindi, Persian, Arabic and Zend. He graduated from the university in 1828.

== Arrival in India and early missionary activities ==
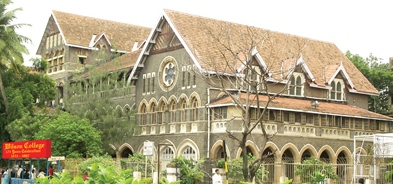
Wilson College, Mumbai, established 1832.

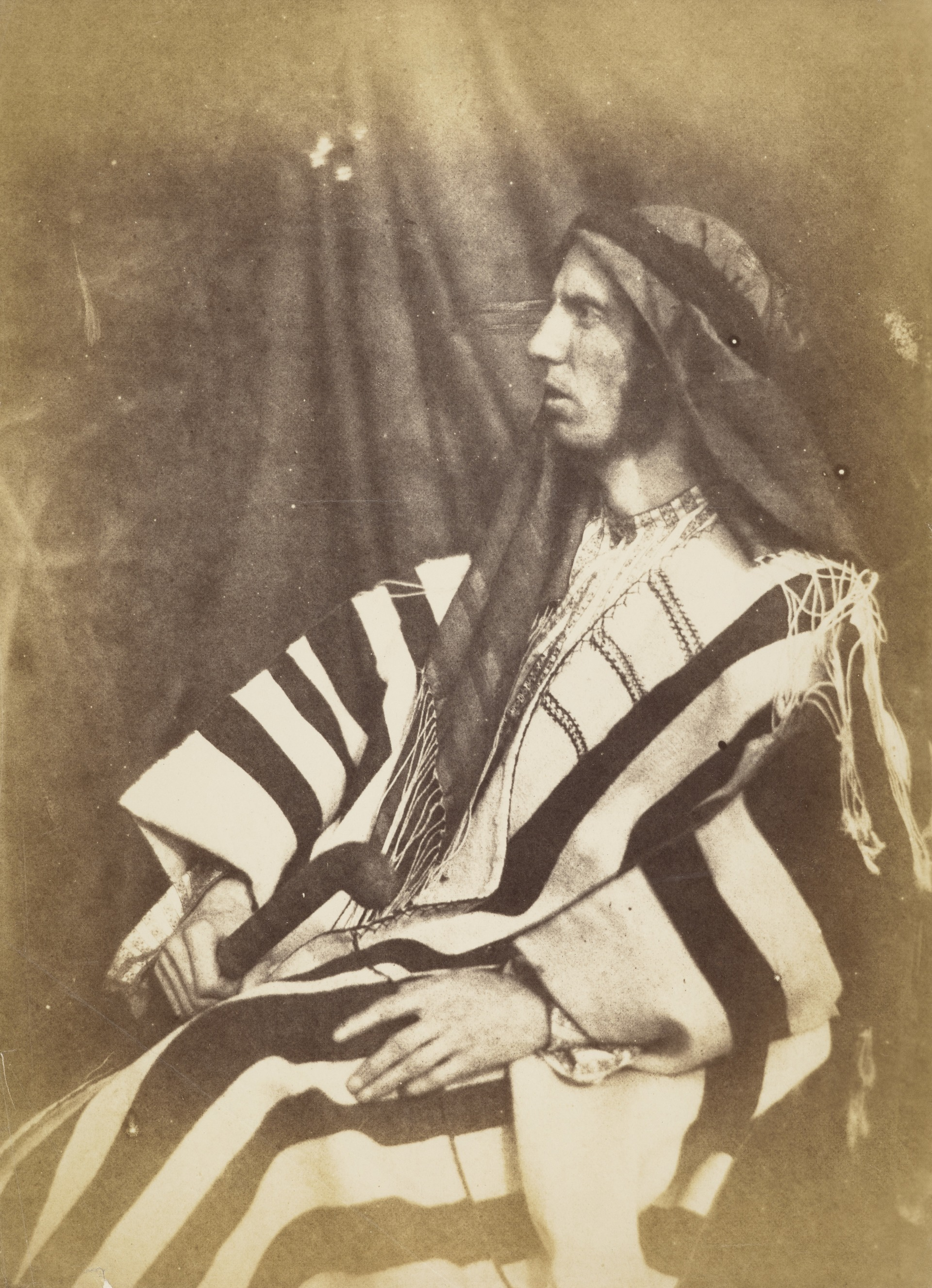
Rev. Dr John Wilson dressing for an early photograph by David Octavius Hill & Robert Adamson

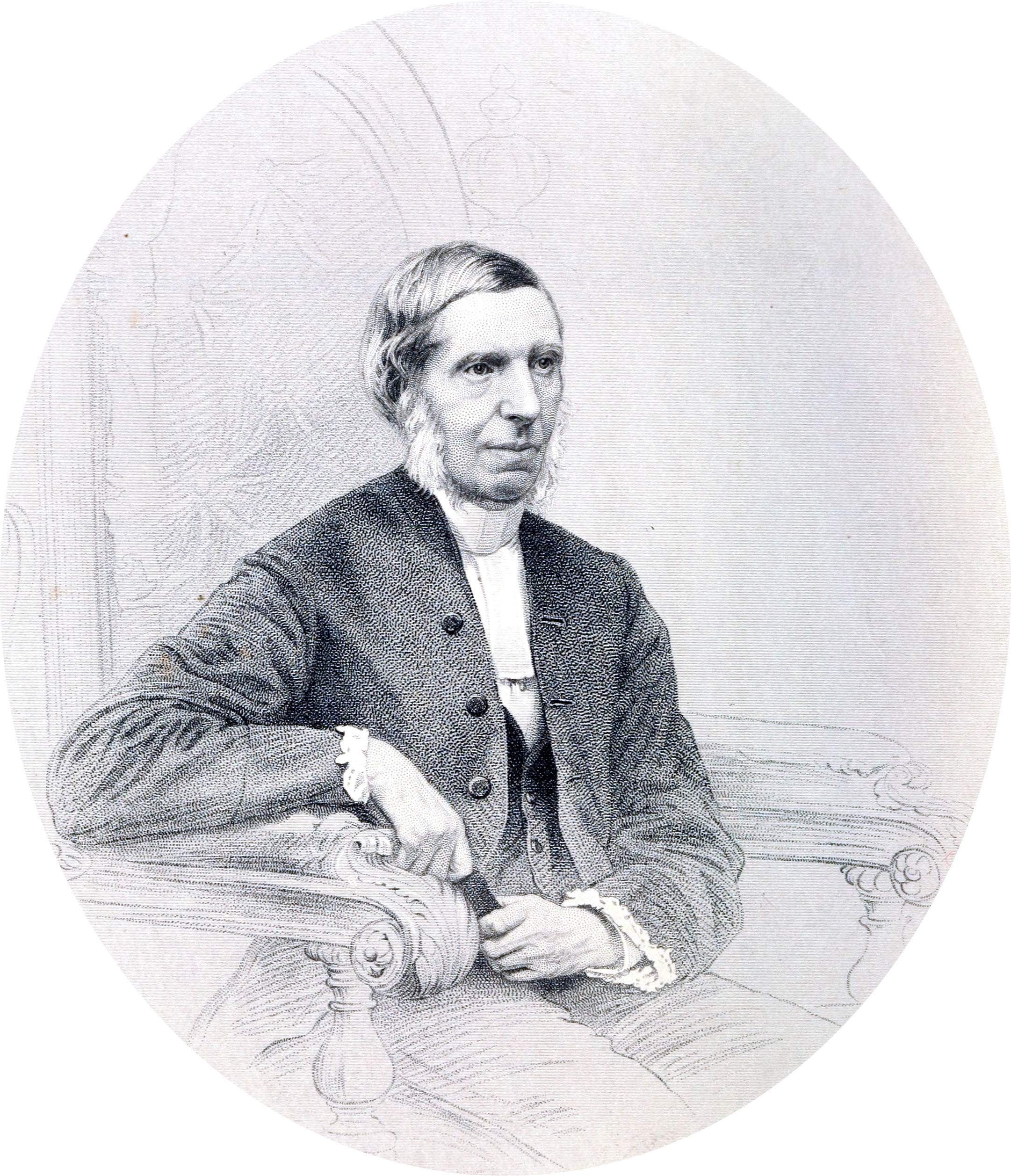
John Wilson from George Smith's biography

In 1829, a year after his graduation, Wilson and his wife went to Bombay as Christian missionaries supported by the Church of Scotland.

The couple first studied Marathi at Harnai; then in 1831 they moved back to Bombay, where Wilson established the Ambroli Church for the people.

During 1830-1831, Wilson engaged in debates with Hindu apologists in Bombay.

In 1830, his protege Ram Chandra, a Hindu convert to Christianity, debated with several Hindu Brahmin apologists in public.

In 1831, Wilson himself debated with the Hindu Pandit Morobhatt Dandekar, who summarized his arguments in a Marathi language work titled Shri Hindu Dharma Sthapana.

Wilson translated Dandekar's text into English, and responded to it in his An Exposure of the Hindu Religion. Narayan Rao of Satara responded to Wilson's text in a pamphlet edited by Dandekar, and Wilson responded to it with A Second Exposure of the Hindoo Religion (1834).

Wilson was among the one of Christian missionaries who participated in famous religious polemics with Vishnubuva Brahmachari - an ascetic defender of the Hindu dharma. These meetings were held at Mumbai sea shore from 15 January 1857 to 28 May 1857 on every Thursday evening. Rev. George Bowen had published a book viz. Discussions by the Sea Side giving brief report of these meetings.

== European education in Bombay ==
Determined to set up educational institutions for the young in Bombay, Wilson first established an English school name Wilson High School at Girgaon in 1832, and added a college in 1836 - now called Wilson College, Mumbai. With this school he was able to introduce European education, examinations and textbooks to the people of the city.

This would gradually change the way in which schools in Bombay orchestrated themselves. In 1857 Wilson helped to establish the Bombay University, and went on to become its Vice-Chancellor in 1869.

Wilson's wife, Margaret, also influenced the education system in Bombay, and aided the female population by establishing schools for girls in 1829. In 1832 she established a boarding school for females, now called St. Columba High School. This was western India's first boarding school for females.

The couple also opened schools in Marathi and Hebrew for the Native Jewish community of the Bene Israel of the Konkan region, teaching boys as well as girls and translating the Bible especially the Old Testament for their benefit.

== His wives and family ==
As per the official records, Dr Wilson married:

- In 1828, he married Margaret Bayne and together they went as Christian missionaries of the Scottish Missionary Society to Bombay, India, arriving on 13 February 1829. Wilson and Margaret had a son named Andrew (born 1831). Andrew John Wilson was an Oriental traveler, editor of the Times of India, author of The Abode of Snow (1875) and other works - he died at Ullswater, Howton on 9 June 1881. Following Margaret's death, her sisters, Anna and Hay Bayne, joined Wilson in India as housekeepers and companions.
- In September 1846, Dr Wilson married Isabella who was the second daughter of Scottish advocate James Dennistoun of Dennistoun. She died in 1867 and he was then joined in India by her niece, Miss Taylor.

== Writings ==
Wilson was the author of many books. Early in his mission he started a periodical about religion, society, culture and European thought, called The Oriental Christian Spectator, which ran from 1830 to 1862.

In 1838 he wrote A Memoir of Mrs. Margret Wilson, and in 1850 a Memoir of the Cave Temples and Monasteries and Ancient Remains in Western India.

In 1858 he wrote, India Three Thousand Years Ago. As the years went on he wrote many books, including Parsi Religion (1843), Evangelisation of India (1849), History of the Suppression of Female Infanticide in Western India (1855), Aboriginal Tribes of The Bombay Presidency (1876) and Indian Caste (1877).

As an archaeologist, Wilson wrote the 1847 Lands of the Bible: Visited and Described, the 1861 Caves of Karla (on the Karla Caves), and the 1875 Religious Excavations of Western India: Buddhist, Brahamanical and Jaina.

- He also published a small account about the origins of the Bene Israel Jewish community of the Konkan region in 1838.
- Encouragement to Active Missionary Exertions [anon.] (Edinburgh, 1827)
- The Life of John Eliot, Apostle of the Indians [anon.] (Edinburgh, 1828)
- An Exposure of the Hindu Religion (Bombay, 1832)
- A Second Exposure of the Hindu Religion (Bombay, 1834)
- Missionary Journey in Gujrat and Cutch (Bombay, 1838)
- Memoir of Mrs Margaret Wilson (Edinburgh, 1838, 1840, 1858, 1860)
- Idiomatical Exercises illustrative of the English and Marathi Languages (Bombay, 1839)
- The Parsi Religion . . . unfolded, refuted, and contrasted with Christianity (Bombay, 1843)
- The Doctrine of Jehovah, addressed to the Parsis (Bombay, 1847)
- The Lands of the Bible Visited, 2 vols. (Edinburgh, 1847)
- The Evangelisation of India (Edinburgh, 1849)
- "A Memoir on the Cave Temples and Monasteries, and other Buddhist, Brahmanical, and Jaine Remains of Western India" (Journ. Bombay Asiatic Soc, iii., reprinted in 1850)
- Darkness and Dawn in India (Bombay, 1853)
- History of the Suppression of Infanticide in Western India (Bombay, 1855)
- Sermon at the Baptism of a Parsi Youth (Bombay, 1856)
- India Three Thousand Years Ago (Bombay, 1858)
- Assembly Addresses (Edinburgh, 1870)
- A Poetical Address to India (Bombay, 1872)
- Indian Caste [edited by Peter Paterson],2 vols (Bombay, 1877, Edinburgh, 1878)
- Hazer and Hazor in the Scriptures (n.d.).
- He founded the Oriental Christian Spectator, 1830. Contributed articles to the Bombay Quarterly Review, British and Foreign Evangelical Review, and North British Review.

== External works ==
Works by or about John Wilson at the Internet Archive
