= Cred (company) =

Indian financial technology company

Dreamplug Technologies Pvt. Ltd.
- Trade name: CRED
- Type: Private
- Industry: Financial technology; Payments; Adware
- Founded: 2018; 8 years ago
- Founder: Kunal Shah
- Headquarters: Bengaluru, Karnataka, India
- Revenue: ▲₹2,473 crore (US$260 million) (FY24)
- Net income: ▲₹−1,644 crore (US$−180 million) (FY24)
- Number of employees: 800
- Website: cred.club

CRED, legally known as Dreamplug Technologies Private Limited, is an Indian financial technology company headquartered in Bengaluru, Karnataka. Founded in 2018 by Kunal Shah, the company operates a platform for bill payments, lending, and other financial services.

As of 2026, the company was valued at around US$4.5 billion.

== History ==
Cred was started in 2018 by Kunal Shah as a reward-based credit card payments app. Cred posted losses of ₹360.31 crore in fiscal year 2020, caused primarily due to high expenditure on marketing and advertising. By 2021, the company reported having 5.9 million users.

In 2021, Cred acquired expense management startup Happay and a liquor delivery startup HipBar. In December 2022, Cred acquired a 100% stake in CreditVidya that offers lending as a service to customers who do not have a credit score.

In July 2023, Cred acquired savings and investment platform Spenny. In February 2024, Cred acquired online wealth management and mutual funds startup Kuvera for an undisclosed amount.

In August 2024, the company became a certified customer operating unit (COU) on the Bharat Bill Payment System (BBPS). In November 2024, Cred entered the motor insurance distribution business through its Cred Garage platform under a corporate agency licence issued by the Insurance Regulatory and Development Authority of India (IRDAI).

In November 2024, the company sold Happay to MakeMyTrip for an undisclosed amount.

In September 2025, the company expanded Cred Money to include investment products such as fixed deposits, gold investments, and portfolio management services. In March 2026, Cred received authorisation from the Reserve Bank of India to operate as a payment aggregator.

As part of Meta's investment deal in CRED in June 2026, founder Kunal Shah stepped down as CEO to become global head of WhatsApp. Miten Sampat was appointed interim CEO of CRED.

== Funding ==
Cred raised funding from DST Global, Sequoia Capital (India), and Tiger Global, among other investors, through the four rounds of private funding so far.

In October 2021, Cred started to seek new investors, reporting a $5.5 billion valuation, up from $2.2 billion recorded in April 2021.

In June 2022, CRED raised $80 million in a Series F funding round led by Singapore's sovereign wealth fund, GIC, valuing the company at around $6.4 billion.

In June 2026, Meta Platforms announced an investment of US$900 million to acquire a 20% minority stake in CRED.

Investor	Transaction name	Fund raised	Valuation
Sequoia Capital India	Seed	$30 million	Undisclosed
Sequoia Capital, RTP Ventures, and 25 others	Series A	$636,000	Undisclosed
Sequoia Capital, Ribbit Capital, and seven others	Series B	$120 million	▲$450 million
DST Global, Tiger Global Management, and seven others	Series C	$81 million	▲$806 million
Coatue, Insight Partners, and nine others	Series D	$215 million	▲$2.2 billion
Tiger Global Management, Marshall Wace, and eight others	Series E	$251 million	▲$4.01 billion
GIC Singapore, Tiger Global Management, and three others	Series F	$80 million	▲$6.4 billion
Meta Platforms	Series H	$900 million	▼$4.5 billion

== Marketing and reception ==
Cred became the official sponsor for the Indian Premier League for four years from 2020 to 2023. In 2021, Cred's advertising content and videos, made in-house featuring Indian celebrities, generated significant discourse in news and social media due to its peculiarity, which was both criticized and praised. Cred has received criticism for being overvalued and lacking a sound monetization strategy.
