= Housing.com =

Indian real estate search portal

- Company type: E-commerce, Real Estate, Classifieds
- Available in: English
- Headquarters: Mumbai, Maharashtra, India
- Area served: India
- Founder: Rahul Yadav
- CEO: Dhruv Agarwal
- Industry: Real estate
- Parent: REA Group
- Website: housing.com
- Launched: June 2012; 14 years ago
- Current status: Active

Housing.com is an Indian real estate search portal which allows customers to search for apartments for rent and sale. The company has 6,000 brokers and serves 40 cities in India including Chennai, Mumbai, Bengaluru, Kochi, Kolkata and Delhi.

== History ==
A group of twelve students from the Indian Institute of Technology, Bombay founded Housing.co.in in June 2012. The company purchased Housing.com from San Francisco-based internet entrepreneur, Peter Headington, and the telephone number 03-333-333-333 in September 2013 for a total of $1m.

Since its founding in 2012, Housing.com has raised four rounds of funding. The company raised $2.5 million in Series A funding from Nexus Venture Partners in June 2013. The company used the funds to create its Data Science Lab and to expand to four cities: Bengaluru, Gurugram, Pune, Hyderabad. The company raised another $19M in venture funding, led by Helion Venture Partners, in April 2014.

Housing.com acquired real estate discussion forum, Indian Real Estate Forum (IREF), for $1.2 million in March 2015, Realty BI, a risk assessment firm for realty projects, for $2 million in June 2015, and HomeBuy360, a cloud-based sales lifecycle management platform, for $2 million in August 2015.

In June 2015, Housing.com then-CEO Rahul Yadav accused Sequoia India MD Shailendra Singh of poaching Housing.com staff. Subsequently, he was asked to leave the company altogether, citing objectionable behaviour. Rishabh Gupta was temporarily in charge, before being replaced by Jason Kothari in November 2015.

== Product ==
Housing.com lists properties submitted by users, either brokers or owners, on an interactive map. Search results are filtered by available rooms, lifestyle ratings, child friendliness index (CFI), and area-based pricing.

The company has mapped approximately 650,000 houses in India.

Housing.com's Data Science Lab (DSL) has generated a number of "Heat Map" algorithms and demand flux maps based on these filters.
