= List of internet entrepreneurs =

An internet entrepreneur is an owner, founder or manager of an internet-based business. This list includes internet company founders and people brought on to companies for their general business or accounting acumen, as is the case with some CEOs hired by companies started by entrepreneurs.

For a list of pioneers, see List of internet pioneers.

== Internet entrepreneurs ==
| Name | Notable company or companies |
|---|---|
| Rony Abovitz | Magic Leap, MAKO Surgical Corp. |
| Josh Abramson | CollegeHumor, Vimeo, TeePublic |
| Brian Acton | WhatsApp |
| Rick Adams | Uunet |
| Jay Adelson | Digg, Equinix, Revision3 |
| Dinesh Agarwal | IndiaMART |
| Ritesh Agarwal | OYO Rooms |
| Bhavish Aggarwal | Ola Cabs |
| Christopher Ahlberg | Recorded Future |
| Luis von Ahn | Duolingo, reCAPTCHA |
| Jeremy Allaire | Allaire Corporation, Circle |
| Joseph J. Allaire | Allaire Corporation, RStudio |
| Paul Allen | Microsoft |
| Dmitri Alperovitch | CrowdStrike |
| Sam Altman | Loopt, OpenAI, Y Combinator |
| Brian Alvey | Weblogs, Inc., Ceros |
| Tom Anderson | Myspace |
| Marc Andreessen | Netscape, Opsware, Mosaic, Andreessen Horowitz |
| Andrey Andreev | Badoo |
| Ronnie Apteker | Internet Solutions |
| Jennifer Arcuri | Hacker Hous |
| Marco Arment | Tumblr, Instapaper, Overcast |
| Brian Armstrong | Coinbase |
| Heather Armstrong | Dooce |
| Jeff Arnold | Sharecare, WebMD |
| Mohit Aron | Nutanix, Cohesity |
| Samir Arora | NetObjects, Mode Media |
| Trishneet Arora | TAC Security |
| Scott Arpajian | Download.com, Softonic |
| Michael Arrington | TechCrunch |
| Peter Arvai | Prezi |
| Alexander Asseily | Jawbone, State |
| Jeff Atwood | Stack Overflow, Stack Exchange |
| Nevzat Aydin | Yemeksepeti |
| Calvin Ayre | Bodog |
| Kunal Bahl | Snapdeal |
| Ajit Balakrishnan | Rediff.com |
| Eren Bali | Udemy |
| Binny Bansal | Flipkart |
| Jyoti Bansal | AppDynamics |
| Rohit Bansal | Snapdeal |
| Sachin Bansal | Flipkart |
| Peter Barrett | Rocket Science Games, Playground Global |
| Matt Barrie | Freelancer.com |
| Rich Barton | Glassdoor, Expedia Inc, Zillow |
| David Baszucki | Roblox |
| Jeff Bates | Slashdot |
| Micahel Baum | Splunk |
| Patrick Baynes | UpdatesCentral, PeopleLinx |
| Andy Bechtolsheim | Sun Microsystems, Arista Networks |
| Benjamin Bejbaum | Dailymotion |
| Gordon Bell | QNX |
| Scott Belsky | Behance |
| Marc Benioff | Salesforce.com |
| Dan Benjamin | 5by5 Studios |
| Alice Bentinck | Entrepreneur First, Code First: Girls |
| Angela Benton | NewMe |
| Tikhon Bernstam | Scribd, Parse |
| Charles Best | DonorsChoose.org |
| Jeff Bezos | Amazon, Blue Origin |
| Sabeer Bhatia | Outlook.com |
| Aneel Bhusri | Workday, Inc. |
| Gina Bianchini | Ning, Mighty Networks |
| Noel Biderman | Ashley Madison |
| Sanjeev Bikhchandani | Naukri.com |
| Willem van Biljon | Nimbula |
| Eric Bina | Netscape, Mosaic |
| Christophe Bisciglia | Cloudera, WibiData |
| Gagan Biyani | Udemy, Lyft |
| Trevor Blackwell | Anybots, Eunicycle |
| Steve Blank | Epiphany, Inc. |
| Nathan Blecharczyk | Airbnb |
| Ryan Block | Engadget |
| David Bohnett | GeoCities |
| Cliff Boro | KidZui |
| Eric Boyko | Stingray Digital |
| Christopher Bouzy | Bot Sentinel |
| Alan Braverman | Xoom Corporation |
| Sergey Brin | Google |
| Juliette Brindak | Miss O & Friends |
| Paul Buchheit | FriendFeed |
| Matthew Buckland | Memeburn |
| Paul Budnitz | Ello |
| Ronald T. Burr | NetZero |
| Leah Solivan | TaskRabbit |
| Stewart Butterfield | Flickr, Slack |
| David Byttow | Secret |
| Jason Calacanis | Mahalo.com, Weblogs, Inc. |
| Dalton Caldwell | Snocap |
| Jon Callas | PGP Corporation, Silent Circle |
| Garrett Camp | Uber, StumbleUpon |
| Colin Campbell | Tucows |
| Daniel Cane | CourseInfo |
| Mike Cannon-Brookes | Atlassian |
| Carlos Cardona | Yupi |
| John Carmack | Id Software |
| Martin Casado | Nicira |
| Steve Case | AOL |
| Pete Cashmore | Mashable |
| Maciej Ceglowski | Pinboard |
| Rohit Chadda | Foodpanda |
| Gurbaksh Chahal | BlueLithium, Gravity4, RadiumOne |
| Robin Chase | Zipcar, Veniam |
| Wayne Chang | Crashlytics |
| Stephen Chao | WonderHowTo |
| Charlie Cheever | Quora |
| Paul Chen | Fortiva, FloNetwork |
| Steve Chen | YouTube, MixBit |
| Brian Chesky | Airbnb |
| Alex Chesterman | ZPG plc, Cazoo |
| Ben Chestnut | MailChimp |
| Lew Cirne | New Relic |
| James H. Clark | Netscape |
| Alon Nisim Cohen | CyberArk |
| Bram Cohen | BitTorrent, CodeCon |
| Scott Cook | Intuit |
| Stephen Cohen | Palantir Technologies |
| John Collison | Stripe |
| Patrick Collison | Stripe, Croma |
| Parker Conrad | Zenefits |
| Andrew Conru | Adult FriendFinder |
| Michael Cowpland | Corel |
| Andrew Crawford | The Book Depository |
| Dennis Crowley | Foursquare, Dodgeball |
| Mark Cuban | Broadcast.com |
| Adam Curry | Mevio (PodShow) |
| Adam D'Angelo | Quora |
| Ben Darnell | Cockroach Labs |
| Sky Dayton | EarthLink, Boingo Wireless |
| Nicolas De Santis | Opodo |
| Bart Decrem | Tapulous, Eazel, Flock |
| Michael Dell | Dell |
| Nick Denton | Gawker Media |
| Bharat Desai | Syntel |
| Graeme Devine | Trilobyte, Magic Leap |
| Chris DeWolfe | Myspace |
| Satish Dharmaraj | Zimbra |
| Daniel Dines | UiPath |
| Ryan Disraeli | TeleSign |
| Chris Dixon | Hunch |
| Dan Dodge | QNX |
| Pieter van der Does | Adyen |
| Ralph Dommermuth | United Internet |
| John Donahoe | eBay |
| Jimmy Donaldson | Feastables, MrBeast Burger |
| Jack Dorsey | Twitter, Square Inc. |
| Scott Dorsey | ExactTarget |
| Larry Drebes | Janrain, RocketMail, Desktop.com |
| Rod Drury | Xero |
| Adam Dunkels | Contiki, LwIP, Protothread, uIP (micro IP) |
| David Duffield | Workday, Inc. PeopleSoft |
| Kris Duggan | BetterWorks |
| Phil Dumontet | DASHED |
| Andy Dunn | Bonobos |
| Pavel Durov | VK, Telegram |
| Joshua Dziabiak | The Zebra, ShowClix |
| Fred Ehrsam | Coinbase |
| Mark Essien | Hotels.ng |
| Daniel Ek | Spotify |
| Sean Ellis | GrowthHackers, Qualaroo |
| Larry Ellison | Oracle Corporation |
| Jeri Ellsworth | CastAR |
| John Elvesjo | Tobii Technology |
| Judith Estrin | Bridge Communications, Precept Software, Packet Design |
| Batara Eto | Mixi |
| Marc Ewing | Red Hat |
| Tony Fadell | Nest Labs |
| Mike Faith | Headsets.com |
| Caterina Fake | Flickr, Hunch |
| Steffan Sondermark Fallesen | Servage Hosting |
| Andy Fang | DoorDash |
| Shawn Fanning | Napster, Snocap, Rupture, Path, Airtime.com |
| Farooqui Faisal | Mouthshut.com |
| Scott Farquhar | Atlassian |
| Rahim Fazal | Involver, Inc. |
| Arash Ferdowsi | Dropbox |
| Bran Ferren | Applied Minds |
| David Filo | Yahoo |
| Ryan Finley | SurveyMonkey |
| Jon Fisher | CrowdOptic |
| Rob Fishman | Niche, Brat |
| Mark Fletcher | Bloglines |
| Pete Flint | Trulia |
| Theodor Forselius | Everipedia |
| Justin Frankel | Cockos |
| Jared Friedman | Scribd |
| Nat Friedman | Ximian |
| Janus Friis | Skype, Kazaa, Rdio |
| Gian Fulgoni | ComScore |
| Marcos Galperin | MercadoLibre.com |
| Bill Gates | Microsoft |
| Dirk Gates | Xircom, Xirrus |
| Jonathan Gay | FutureWave Software |
| Joe Gebbia | Airbnb |
| Bruce Gilliat | Alexa Internet |
| Noah Glass | Twitter, Odeo |
| Christoph Glauser | Find Engine, Computerworld |
| Bryan Goldberg | Bustle, Elite Daily, Bleacher Report |
| Jason Goldberg | Fab |
| Dave Goldberg | LAUNCH Media, SurveyMonkey |
| Anthony Goldbloom | Kaggle |
| David Goldman | Sage Group |
| Adam Goldstein | Hipmunk |
| Vishal Gondal | GOQii, Indiagames |
| Otavio Good | Word Lens |
| Kris Gopalakrishnan | Infosys |
| Terry Gou | Foxconn |
| Paul Graham | Viaweb, Y Combinator, Hacker News |
| Jeff Green | The Trade Desk, AdECN |
| Logan Green | Lyft |
| Josh Greenberg | Grooveshark |
| Meron Gribetz | Meta |
| Fabrice Grinda | OLX, Zingy, Aucland |
| Daniel Gross | Cue |
| Tom Gruber | Siri |
| Garrett Gruener | Ask.com, Alta Partners |
| Dominique Guinard | EVRYTHNG |
| Vikas Gupta | Jambool |
| Andi Gutmans | Zend Technologies |
| Oleg Gutsol | 500px |
| Daniel Ha | Disqus |
| Simon Hackett | Internode |
| Eric Hahn | Proofpoint, Inc., Lookout Software |
| Brian Halligan | HubSpot |
| Jeff Hammerbacher | Cloudera |
| John Hanke | Niantic, Ingress |
| David Heinemeier Hansson | Basecamp, Ruby on Rails, Instiki |
| Mike Harrington | Valve, Picnik |
| Julia Hartz | Eventbrite |
| Kevin Hartz | Eventbrite, Xoom Corporation |
| Will Harvey | Forterra Systems, IMVU |
| Demis Hassabis | DeepMind Technologies Limited, Isomorphic Labs |
| Reed Hastings | Netflix |
| Trip Hawkins | Electronic Arts, The 3DO Company, Digital Chocolate |
| Angie Hicks | Angi |
| Jared Hecht | GroupMe |
| Scott Heiferman | Meetup, Fotolog |
| Ahti Heinla | Starship Technologies, Skype |
| Brett Helm | Coradiant, DB Networks |
| Cal Henderson | Slack |
| Joe Hewitt | Firefox, Parakey |
| Danny Hillis | Metaweb, Applied Minds |
| David Hindawi | Tanium, BigFix Inc |
| Orion Hindawi | Tanium |
| Alexa Hirschfeld | Paperless Post |
| James Hirschfeld | Paperless Post |
| Jeremy Hitchcock | Dyn |
| Veda Hlubinka-Cook | Metaweb |
| Andy Hobsbawm | EVRYTHNG |
| Reid Hoffman | LinkedIn |
| Ryan Holmes | Hootsuite |
| Bri Holt | Engrade |
| Dietmar Hopp | SAP |
| Ben Horowitz | Opsware, Andreessen Horowitz |
| Meg Hourihan | Pyra Labs, Kinja |
| Drew Houston | Dropbox |
| Ken Howery | PayPal, Founders Fund |
| Tony Hsieh | Zappos, LinkExchange |
| Jen-Hsun Huang | Nvidia |
| Ma Huateng | Tencent |
| Arianna Huffington | Huffington Post, Thrive Global |
| Steve Huffman | Reddit |
| Chris Hughes | Facebook |
| Chad Hurley | YouTube, MixBit |
| Dave Hyatt | Firefox, WebKit, Safari |
| P.J. Hyett | GitHub |
| Aaron Iba | AppJet, Etherpad |
| Miguel de Icaza | Xamarin |
| Brendan Iribe | Oculus VR |
| Subrah Iyar | WebEx |
| Charlie Jackson | Silicon Beach Software, FutureWave Software |
| Naveen Jain | Blucora, Moon Express, Intelius |
| Sumit Jain | Commonfloor.com |
| Josh James | Domo, Omniture |
| Philip J. K. James | Snooth, Lot18 |
| Xeni Jardin | Boing Boing |
| Jack Jia | Trusper |
| Steve Jobs | Apple Inc, Pixar |
| Bryan Johnson | Braintree, OS Fund, Kernel |
| Lawrence Jones | UKFast |
| Lisa S. Jones | EyeMail Inc. |
| Michael Jones | Userplane, MoVoxx, People Media, Brizzly, Myspace |
| Vikas Joshi | Elicitus |
| Lei Jun | Xiaomi, Amazon China |
| Brewster Kahle | Alexa Internet |
| Philippe Kahn | Fullpower Technologies, LightSurf, Starfish Software, Borland |
| Travis Kalanick | Uber, Red Swoosh, Scour Inc. |
| Justin Kan | Socialcam, Twitch, Exec |
| Philip J. Kaplan | Blippy |
| Amit Kapur | Gravity |
| Jawed Karim | YouTube |
| Alex Karp | Palantir Technologies |
| David Karp | Tumblr |
| Kenji Kasahara | Mixi |
| Eugene Kaspersky | Kaspersky Lab |
| Natalya Kaspersky | Kaspersky Lab |
| Brad Keywell | Groupon, Lightbank, Mediaocean |
| Salman Khan | Khan Academy |
| Vinod Khosla | Sun Microsystems, Khosla Ventures |
| Spencer Kimball | Cockroach Labs |
| Zach Klein | Vimeo |
| Marcin Kleczynski | Malwarebytes |
| OD Kobo | Pheed |
| Ruslan Kogan | Kogan.com |
| Josh Kopelman | Half.com |
| Jan Koum | WhatsApp |
| Shlomo Kramer | Check Point, Imperva, Cato Networks |
| Gary Kremen | Match.com |
| Mike Krieger | Instagram |
| Scott Kurnit | About.com |
| George Kurtz | CrowdStrike |
| Sandra Kurtzig | ASK Group, Kenandy |
| Joshua Kushner | Oscar Health |
| Willem Van Lancker | Oyster |
| Renaud Laplanche | Lending Club |
| Doug Leeds | Ask.com |
| Eric Lefkofsky | Groupon, Lightbank, Mediaocean |
| Shane Legg | Google DeepMind |
| Howard Lerman | Yext |
| Sandy Lerner | Cisco Systems |
| Max Levchin | Zip2, PayPal, Slide.com, Affirm |
| Aaron Levie | Box |
| Jeremy Levitt | Service Seeking |
| Robin Li | Baidu |
| Kenneth Lin | Credit Karma |
| Vinny Lingham | Yola, Silicon Cape Initiative |
| Jesse Lipson | ShareFile |
| Ted Livingston | Kik Messenger |
| Andrea Lo | Piggybackr |
| Claes Loberg | Guvera |
| Jake Lodwick | Vimeo |
| Peter Loftin | Business Telecom |
| Marc Lore | Diapers.com, Jet.com |
| Martin Lorentzon | Tradedoubler, Spotify |
| Palmer Luckey | Oculus VR |
| Fred Luddy | ServiceNow |
| Tobias Lütke | Shopify |
| Eric Ly | LinkedIn |
| Michael Richard Lynch | Autonomy Corporation |
| Barrett Lyon | Prolexic Technologies, Defense.Net |
| Adam Lyons | The Zebra |
| Jack Ma | Alibaba Group |
| Igor Magazinnik | Viber, iMesh |
| Chris Malachowsky | Nvidia |
| Kumar Malavalli | InMage, Brocade Communications Systems |
| Rob Malda | Slashdot |
| John Manoogian III | 140 Proof |
| Talmon Marco | Viber, Juno, IMesh, Expand Networks |
| Andrew Mason | Groupon |
| Natalie Massenet | Net-a-Porter |
| Daniel Mattes | Jumio, Jajah |
| Peter Mattis | Cockroach Labs |
| Jed McCaleb | eDonkey network, Ripple, Stellar |
| Andrew McCollum | Facebook |
| Mike McCue | Tellme Networks, Flipboard |
| Jim McKelvey | Square Inc. |
| Nick McKeown | Nicira, Open Networking Foundation |
| William von Meister | The Source, AOL, CompuServe |
| Dwight Merriman | DoubleClick, MongoDB Inc. |
| Heidi Messer | Rakuten Linkshare |
| Stephen Messer | Rakuten Linkshare |
| Loïc Le Meur | Seesmic |
| Andrew Michael | Fasthosts, Livedrive, Bark |
| Bob Miner | Oracle Corporation |
| Rich Miner | Wildfire Communications, Android |
| Halsey McLean Minor | CNET |
| Kavin Bharti Mittal | hike Messenger |
| Mahbod Moghadam | Genius, Everipedia |
| Nick Molnar | Afterpay |
| Louis Monier | AltaVista |
| Darius A. Monsef IV | Creative Market |
| Brit Morin | Brit + Co |
| Dave Morin | Path |
| Dustin Moskovitz | Facebook, Asana |
| Mira Murati | OpenAI, ChatGPT |
| Matt Mullenweg | WordPress, Automattic, Akismet |
| Bobby Murphy | Snapchat |
| N. R. Narayana Murthy | Infosys |
| Elon Musk | PayPal, Tesla Motors, SpaceX, Neuralink, SolarCity, The Boring Company, OpenAI, Zip2 |
| Demet Mutlu | Trendyol group |
| Shiv Nadar | HCL |
| Satya Nadella | Microsoft |
| Mariam Naficy | Minted |
| Divya Narendra | ConnectU, SumZero |
| Ted Nash | Little Gossip, Tapdaq |
| Ashwin Navin | BitTorrent |
| Col Needham | IMDb |
| Seth Neiman | Brocade Communications Systems |
| Gabe Newell | Valve |
| Craig Newmark | Craigslist |
| Bill Nguyen | Color Labs, Lala |
| Preetish Nijhawan | Akamai Technologies |
| Nandan Nilekani | Infosys |
| Hiroyuki Nishimura | 2channel, Niconico, 2ch.sc, 4chan |
| Luke Nosek | PayPal |
| Ed Oates | Oracle Corporation |
| Kevin O'Connor | DoubleClick, FindTheBest, Graphiq |
| Alexis Ohanian | Reddit, Initialized Capital |
| Tom Okman | Nord Security |
| Shaul Olmert | Playbuzz |
| Pierre Omidyar | eBay |
| Seun Osewa | Nairaland |
| Alec Oxenford | OLX, Letgo |
| Raphael Ouzan | BillGuard |
| Stepan Pachikov | Evernote |
| Larry Page | Google |
| Vijay Pandurangan | Mitro |
| James Park | Fitbit |
| Sean Parker | Spotify, Plaxo, Napster, Causes |
| Bob Parsons | Go Daddy |
| Ali Partovi | Code.org, LinkExchange, ILike |
| Ben Pasternak | Impossible Rush, Impossible Dial, Flogg, Monkey |
| Narendra Patni | IGATE |
| Aaron Patzer | Mint.com, Fountain |
| Sunil Paul | Sidecar, Brightmail |
| Bo Peabody | Tripod.com |
| Carl Pei | OnePlus, Nothing |
| Barney Pell | Moon Express, Powerset |
| Robert Pera | Ubiquiti Networks, Memphis Grizzlies |
| Jonah Peretti | BuzzFeed, The Huffington Post |
| Melanie Perkins | Canva |
| Markus Persson | Mojang, The Huffington Post |
| Jeffrey Peterson | Quepasa, The Meet Group |
| Dan Pelson | Word Magazine, Bolt.com |
| Dan Pickett | Nfrastructure |
| Mark Pincus | Zynga, Tribe.net, Support.com |
| Adam Pisoni | Yammer |
| Hasso Plattner | SAP |
| Alvin Poh | Vodien |
| Kim Polese | ClearStreet, SpikeSource |
| Christopher Poole | 4chan.org |
| Joris Poort | Rescale |
| Vipul Ved Prakash | Topsy Labs |
| Azim Premji | WIPRO |
| Tom Preston-Werner | GitHub, Gravatar, Jekyll |
| Curtis Priem | Nvidia |
| Tom Proulx | Intuit |
| Jeff Pulver | Vonage, Zula |
| Liu Qiangdong | JD.com |
| Ashley Qualls | SickNotDead.com, WhatEverLife.com |
| Hooman Radfar | AddThis |
| N. S. Raghavan | Infosys |
| Dhiraj Rajaram | Mu Sigma Inc. |
| Vivek Ranadive | TIBCO Software |
| Jerry Rao | Mphasis |
| Osman Rashid | Kno, Chegg |
| Aza Raskin | Songza |
| Jens Eilstrup Rasmussen | Google Maps, Google Wave |
| Lars Rasmussen | Google Maps |
| Ramalinga Raju | Satyam Computer Services |
| Byju Raveendran | Byju's |
| Naval Ravikant | AngelList |
| B. V. R. Mohan Reddy | Cyient |
| René Rechtman | Moonberg Entertainment |
| Renato Soru | Tiscali |
| Eric Ries | IMVU, Lean startup |
| Jordan Ritter | Cloudmark |
| Jesse Robbins | Chef |
| John Roberts | SugarCRM |
| Michael Robertson | MP3.com, Linspire, Gizmo5 |
| Peter Rojas | Gizmodo, Engadget, Joystiq |
| Martin Roscheisen | FindLaw |
| Kevin Rose | Digg, Pownce, Revision3 |
| Philip Rosedale | Linden Lab |
| Bob Rosenschein | Answers.com |
| Justin Rosenstein | Asana |
| Blake Ross | Firefox, Parakey |
| Andy Rubin | Danger, Android |
| Christian Rudder | OkCupid |
| Matt Rutledge | Woot |
| Kevin P. Ryan | MongoDB Inc., DoubleClick, Business Insider |
| David O. Sacks | Yammer, Geni.com, Craft Ventures |
| Fahim Saleh | Gokada, Pathao, JoBike |
| Larry Sanger | Citizendium, Wikipedia |
| Eduardo Saverin | Facebook |
| Michael J. Saylor | MicroStrategy |
| Michael Sayman | 4 Snaps |
| Alan Schaaf | Imgur |
| Joshua Schachter | Delicious, Memepool, Geo URI scheme |
| Stephan Schambach | Demandware, Intershop Communications AG |
| Frank Schilling | Uniregistry |
| Ernesto Schmitt | Fabula AI, The Craftory, Beamly |
| Arnout Schuijff | Adyen |
| Paul Sciarra | Pinterest |
| Adrian Scott | Ryze |
| John Sculley | Zeta Interactive |
| Michael Seibel | Justin.tv, Socialcam |
| Jeff Seibert | Crashlytics |
| Naveen Selvadurai | Foursquare |
| Arjun Sethi | MessageMe, Lolapps, Yahoo! Livetext |
| Nahum Sharfman | Shopping.com |
| Tina Sharkey | Brandless |
| Vijay Shekhar Sharma | Paytm |
| Evan Sharp | Pinterest |
| Emmett Shear | Justin.tv, Twitch |
| S. D. Shibulal | Infosys |
| Will Shu | Deliveroo |
| Mark Shuttleworth | Canonical, Thawte |
| Gil Shwed | Check Point |
| Sebastian Siemiatkowski | Klarna |
| Ben Silbermann | Pinterest |
| Russel Simmons | Yelp |
| Charles Simonyi | Intentional Software |
| Pradeep Sindhu | Juniper Networks |
| Param Singh | Mr Lawyer |
| Gunjan Sinha | EGain |
| Rashmi Sinha | Slideshare |
| Jeffrey Skoll | EBay |
| Dylan Smith | Box |
| Ryan Smith | Qualtrics |
| Jack Smith | Outlook.com |
| Javier Soltero | Outlook Mobile |
| Angelo Sotira | DeviantArt |
| Mark Spencer | Digium |
| Evan Spiegel | Snap Inc. (formerly Snapchat) |
| Joel Spolsky | Stack Exchange, Fog Creek Software, Trello |
| Balaji Srinivasan | Counsyl, Earn.com, Teleport |
| Eric Stanley | Stay Inspired |
| David A. Steinberg | Zeta Interactive |
| Stephen Stokols | FreedomPop |
| Biz Stone | Twitter, Jelly |
| Jeremy Stoppelman | Yelp |
| Ludvig Strigeus | μTorrent |
| Krishna Subramanian | BlueLithium |
| Zeev Suraski | Zend Technologies |
| Mustafa Suleyman | Google DeepMind |
| Ilya Sutskever | AlexNet, OpenAI |
| Mikkel Svane | Zendesk |
| John A. Swanson | Ansys |
| Aaron Swartz | Reddit |
| Patrick Sweeney | ODIN Technologies |
| Kara Swisher | Recode |
| Kevin Systrom | Instagram |
| David Tabizel | HP Autonomy |
| Richard (Dick) Talens | Fitocracy |
| Yuval Tal | Payoneer |
| Garry Tan | Posterous, Initialized Capital |
| Yoshikazu Tanaka | GREE, Inc. |
| Stanley Tang | DoorDash |
| Bret Taylor | FriendFeed, Quip |
| Keith Teare | Techcrunch, RealNames, Easynet |
| Han Terra | TeRra Magazine |
| Rodrigo Teijeiro | RecargaPay, Sonico.com, Fnbox |
| Astro Teller | BodyMedia |
| Chuck Templeton | OpenTable |
| Jay Martin Tenenbaum | CommerceNet |
| Milun Tesovic | MetroLyrics |
| Peter Thiel | PayPal, Palantir Technologies, Clarium Capital, Founders Fund, Valar Ventures |
| Steven Thomas | Webroot |
| Sebastian Thrun | Udacity |
| Linus Torvalds | Linux, Linux Kernel, Git, Subsurface |
| Gina Trapani | Lifehacker |
| Clay Travis | OutKick |
| Vlad Trifa | EVRYTHNG |
| Benjamin Trott | Six Apart, Movable Type, TypePad |
| Mena Trott | Six Apart, Movable Type, TypePad |
| Penelope Trunk | penelopetrunk.com |
| Janie Tsao | Linksys |
| Victor Tsao | Linksys |
| Klaus Tschira | SAP |
| Greg Tseng | Tagged |
| Bhavin Turakhia | CodeChef, Media.net, Flock, Ringo, Zeta India |
| Divyank Turakhia | Media.net |
| Isaiah Turner | Monkey |
| Tien Tzuo | Zuora |
| David Ulevitch | OpenDNS, EveryDNS |
| Deena Varshavskaya | Wanelo |
| Raj Vattikuti | Covansys Corporation |
| Ricky Van Veen | CollegeHumor |
| Juan Villalonga | Terra.com |
| Kyle Vogt | Cruise Automation, Justin.tv |
| Anubhav Wadhwa | Tyrelessly |
| Romesh Wadhwani | Symphony Technology Group |
| Dan Wagner | Venda Inc |
| Todd Wagner | Broadcast.com |
| Justin Waldron | Zynga |
| Jimmy Wales | Wikipedia, Wikia |
| John Walker | Autodesk |
| Michael Walrath | Right Media |
| Niniane Wang | Niantic |
| Chris Wanstrath | GitHub |
| David Warthen | Ask.com |
| Matt Watson | Stackify, VinSolutions |
| Lynda Weinman | lynda.com |
| Andrew Weinreich | SixDegrees.com |
| Claus Wellenreuther | SAP |
| Jay Westerdal | DomainTools |
| Evan Williams | Blogger, Twitter, Medium |
| Maisie Williams | Daisie |
| Jake Winebaum | FamilyFun, Business.com |
| Whitney Wolfe Herd | Bumble, Tinder |
| Brian Wong | kiip |
| Steven Woods | NeoEdge Networks |
| Steve Wozniak | Apple Inc, Wheels of Zeus |
| Graham Wylie | Sage Group |
| Eric Xu | Baidu |
| Tony Xu | DoorDash |
| Rahul Yadav | Housing.com |
| Sam Yagan | OkCupid, SparkNotes |
| Jerry Yang | Yahoo |
| Richard Yoo | Rackspace, ServerBeach |
| Bob Young | Red Hat |
| Peggy Yu | Dangdang |
| Niklas Zennström | Atomico, Skype, Kazaa |
| Yiming Zhang | Bytedance (Douyin/TikTok) |
| Changpeng Zhao | Binance) |
| Ilya Zhitomirskiy | Diaspora |
| Min Zhu | WebEx |
| John Zimmer | Lyft |
| Phil Zimmermann | Pretty Good Privacy, Zfone |
| Zohar Zisapel | RAD Group |
| Mark Zuckerberg | Facebook |
| Avishai Abrahami | Wix.com |

== See also ==
- List of entrepreneurs
- List of internet pioneers
- Startup company
- Business incubator
- Skunkworks project
