= James Hirschfeld =

James Hirschfeld may refer to:

- James Hirschfeld (chief executive), co-founder and CEO of Paperless Post
- James William Peter Hirschfeld, Australian mathematician
- Jimmy Hirschfeld, television director and producer
