= Controversies of the 2006 United States Senate election in Maryland =

This article covers the controversies of Maryland's 2006 campaign for the United States Senate between Democrat Ben Cardin and Republican Michael Steele.

== Racial attacks during campaign ==
Since announcing his candidacy, Steele had been the target of attacks that he said are racially tinged. A blog run by Steve Gilliard, a politically liberal African-American, depicted Steele as a blackface minstrel. Tim Kaine, the Democratic Governor of Virginia, subsequently pulled all his ads from the blog.

== Stem cell comparison ==
When discussing his position on embryonic stem cells before Jewish leaders on February 9, 2006, Steele compared the science with experiments performed on Jews during the Holocaust and with slavery, saying, "(Y)ou of all folks know what happens when people decide they want to experiment on human beings.... I know that as well in my community, out of our experience with slavery, and so I'm very cautious when people say this is the best new thing, this is going to save lives." Art Abramson, executive director of the Baltimore Jewish Council, criticized Steele for his remarks, rejecting the comparison "between ethical and lifesaving medical research, and the horrors committed by the Nazis in their evil drive to create a master race." Cardin, who is Jewish and a supporter of embryonic stem-cell research, also criticized Steele.

== DSCC credit report incident ==
Staffers of the Democratic Senatorial Campaign Committee illegally obtained a copy of Steele's credit report during the campaign. Researcher Lauren Weiner used Steele's social security number to obtain his credit report from TransUnion. Weiner used Research Director Katie Barge's DSCC credit card to pay for the report. After an internal investigation, the Maryland Democratic Party determined the credit report was obtained illegally, and reported the incident to the United States Attorney. Weiner pleaded guilty to a misdemeanor charge of computer fraud and will do 150 hours of community service. Barge resigned from the DSCC.

Steele used the incident in a fund-raising mailing and attack ads against Ben Cardin. Steele stated in the fund-raising letter "from stealing my credit report to endless personal attacks, Congressman Ben Cardin just can't seem to have a real debate on the issues..." In the television ad, Steele said "Ben Cardin's team hacks into my credit report...". Cardin responded "and Michael Steele knows this – there is no connection whatsoever with the [credit report] episode and [me] or my campaign."

== Campaign website ==
In July 2006, Steele posted photographs on his website that included him with prominent local and national Democrats from events where Steele appeared as the Lieutenant Governor, not as a candidate, without their permission. The posting came under criticism from the local party and Congressman Steny Hoyer (D-5th), and Steele removed the photographs. The Maryland Democratic Party started its own website with photographs of Steele with Republicans unpopular in the state.

== Martin Luther King Jr. advertisement ==
In September 2006, an advertisement run by the National Black Republican Association in support of Steele generated controversy for its claims. For example, it claimed that Martin Luther King Jr., was a Republican. The ad also accused Democrats in general of opposing civil rights legislation and releasing "vicious dogs and fire hoses on blacks." After hearing the ad for himself, Steele disavowed it and asked that it be pulled from the air.

== Cardin staffer blogging ==
On September 16, 2006, Cardin's campaign fired a staffer who had maintained a blog about her experiences within the campaign. In addition to revealing details about the campaign, some of the blog entries contained racial and ethnic slurs. For example, some entries discussed the hypersensitivity of the campaign to racial issues, claiming that a black staffer on the campaign was able to keep his job solely due to playing "the racism card". In another entry, the staffer expressed her belief that she was a "sex object" for Jewish friends of Cardin, whom she described as having "Jewish noses." Although the Cardin campaign maintained it was a "junior staffer," some bloggers revealed that the staffer was Ursula Gruber, a regional director in charge of other workers in the campaign.

== Handing out misleading voter guides ==
On November 7, 2006, Bob Ehrlich's gubernatorial re-election campaign and Michael Steele's Maryland senatorial campaign recruited seven busloads of homeless Philadelphians to distribute misleading voter guides in Maryland. Each "official voter guide", headlined "Democratic Sample Ballot", had boxes checked beside Ehrlich's and Steele's names and those of Democratic candidates in other races, with photos of black Democratic leaders on the front. The fliers were handed out to mostly poor and black voters in Prince George's County in Maryland. Workers said that first lady Kendel Ehrlich personally gave them T-shirts and hats and thanked them. However, Ehrlich claimed to be unaware that these workers were hired from Philadelphia. The campaign tactic was widely criticized by Democrats for confusing and misleading voters.

== Election-eve campaign mailers ==
On November 6, 2006, the day before the general election, Gov. Ehrlich's and Lt. Gov. Steele's campaigns mailed a flier to a number of Prince George's County residents. The flier, a self-proclaimed "Ehrlich-Steele Democrats Official Voter Guide," was a sample ballot endorsing Ehrlich and Steele alongside numerous Democratic politicians. The front cover of the mailer featured pictures of several current and former Democratic candidates for public office, with the text, "These Are Our Choices."

Many Democrats criticized the mailer as misleading, as it could imply that Ehrlich and Steele were Democrats. (The text on the back of the mailer encouraged Democrats to vote for Republican candidates, but the sample ballot itself made no mention of the candidates' party affiliations.) Others, including Kweisi Mfume and Jack B. Johnson said that the featuring of three Prince George's County Democrats on the front of the mailer suggested that they all had endorsed Ehrlich and Steele, which was not the case.

== Alleged misuse of campaign funds ==
In 2009, it became known that Steele's former finance chairman, Alan B. Fabian, had reported to federal prosecutors that Steele used his 2006 Senate campaign fund to pay a by-then-defunct company, Brown Sugar Unlimited run by his sister, for "catering/web services" that were allegedly never performed. Fabian provided the information to federal prosecutors in 2008 during his plea negotiations on unrelated fraud charges (for which he was sentenced to 9 years in prison). On February 7, 2009, Steele, through a spokesman, said that the payments to his sister "were fully disclosed and are completely proper and in full compliance with all state and federal laws."

In March 2009, Jayne Miller of WBAL Baltimore 11 reported that Steele's Senate campaign made four payments for "political consulting" in October and November 2006 to the company Allied Berton, totaling more than $64,000; the company also received more than $350,000 during the same period from campaign committees controlled by Maryland Governor Robert Ehrlich and the Maryland Republican party. Allied Berton's business, according to its website, was trading commodities, such as minerals, metals, coffee and sugar. According to Miller's report, the owner of the firm, Sandy Roberts, hosted a tribute to Michael Steele in New York during the 2004 Republican National Convention and was the beneficiary of an Ehrlich-Steele administration action which paved the way for a multiple-outlet retail concession at Baltimore Washington International Airport. A Steele spokesman said only that his campaign complied with all Federal Election Commission regulations.
