= Adrian Scott (disambiguation) =

Adrian Scott (1912–1972) was an American screenwriter and film producer.

Adrian Scott may also refer to:

- Adrian Gilbert Scott (1882–1963), English architect
- Adrian Scott (entrepreneur), Canadian entrepreneur
- Adrian Scott (Family Affairs), a character on Family Affairs
