= Harbinger Knowledge Products =

American eLearning company

- Company type: Private
- Industry: Software Development & Elearning
- Founded: 1990
- Headquarters: Pune, India
- Number of locations: Redmond, WA, Pleasanton, CA
- Key people: Vikas Joshi, Chairman & MD, Harbinger Group; Swati Ketkar, Director; Jayant Kulkarni, Executive Director — Harbinger Knowledge Products; Seema Chaudhary, President — Harbinger Knowledge Products Inc.
- Website: www.harbingerknowledge.com

Harbinger Knowledge Products is a part of Harbinger Group, which was established in 1990. It is an eLearning software products and content development services company. The global headquarters and development centres are located in Pune, India while it has offices in Redmond, WA and Pleasanton, CA.

Harbinger holds patents on technologies for single-user learning interaction, and multi-user social interaction, which form the basis of its products (Elicitus, Raptivity, YawnBuster, SiteJazzer and TeemingPod) and services (Mobile learning services, custom eLearning services, and Training outsourcing services).

Harbinger's products are used by U.S. government organizations as well as in more than 57 countries globally.

An elearning project executed by Harbinger was an online learning game in medical education for Philips Learning Center, which leveraged the cognitive benefits of game-based learning. Another involved the use of game-based media content to teach science through insects for the Entomological Foundation USA, while a third project consisted of a series of animation films to spread traffic awareness in Pune on behalf of the Rotary Club.

== Recognitions ==
Harbinger Knowledge Products has been recognized by Red Herring in its Global 100 Winners list in 2009. It has also been recognized by NASSCOM in its Top 50 Indian IT Innovators list. Deloitte has named Harbinger Knowledge Products amongst the fastest growing technology companies in its Technology Fast 500 Asia Pacific and Technology Fast 50 India programs in 2008 & 2009. Harbinger Knowledge Products also features in the Training Outsourcing companies and Content Development companies watchlist for 2011, announced by Training Industry Inc.
