= Steve Gilliard =

American freelance journalist

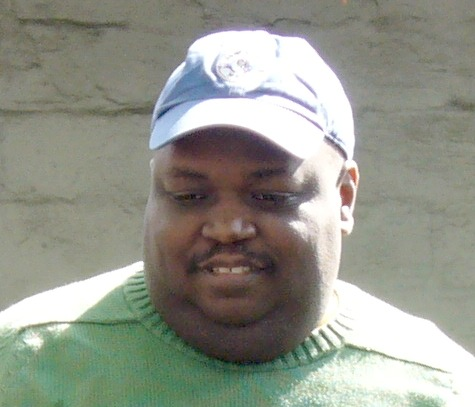
- Born: November 13, 1964; New York City, U.S.
- Died: June 2, 2007 (aged 42)
- Education: Hunter College High School; New York University
- Occupations: Freelance journalist; blogger

Steve Gilliard (November 13, 1964 – June 2, 2007) was an American freelance journalist and left-wing political blogger who ran the website The News Blog. An outspoken and at times controversial figure, he was an influential voice in the left-wing political blogosphere.

== Life and career ==
Born and raised in New York City, Gilliard attended Hunter College Elementary and Hunter College High School, laboratory schools for the gifted operated by Hunter College. He was a graduate of NYU, where he studied history and journalism. He worked as a freelance writer for various print publications from 1986 to 1992, after which he spent two years on the New Jersey Democratic State Committee campaign staff. From 1994 to 1996, Gilliard worked as a researcher, and then returned to writing—this time for the on-line medium—as a freelancer on various projects for the next two years.

In 1998, Gilliard joined the netslaves.com website as featured Web writer and "Media Operative"—a position he held through 2003. The site chronicled poor business practices and employee conditions in dot-com companies, particularly the Silicon Alley tech companies of New York. Among his more influential columns for the site was the "How to Read a 10Q" series, which took a reader-friendly investigative approach to dissecting SEC-mandated corporate financial and governance reports. Gilliard also wrote more broadly on topics deemed to be of interest to the NY-based geek, from love issues to how to install a new motherboard.

In 2003, Gilliard was tasked with contributing to and moderating netslaves.com's online bulletin board, which had grown in usership after instances of homophobia and racism alienated a large group of users from Philip Kaplan's FuckedCompany.com. These users flocked to netslaves, but two feuding users (who went by the names Cheopys and Uncle Meat, of left and right political persuasion, respectively) repeatedly created situations in which Gilliard would have to arbitrate discussions. In June 2004, Gilliard banned both users, causing a boycott, a massive defection of users, and eventually, the closure of netslaves.com.

After the demise of Netslaves, Gilliard spent several months as a diarist and contributing editor to the Daily Kos site. In August 2003, in addition to occasional contributions to sites such as The Huffington Post, he began his own independent site. Gilliard was the primary writer and operator of "The News Blog", which he maintained until his hospitalization and subsequent death in June 2007.

Gilliard died on June 2, 2007, at age forty-two, following a series of heart and kidney problems.

== Influence ==
In a tribute posted on June 3, Daily Kos founder Markos Moulitsas wrote about Gilliard's influence on his own site:

When reporters ask me when I first started thinking Daily Kos would become something more important, I tell them about the Dean campaign, or about the traffic explosion during the run-up and start of the Iraq War. But that's pretty much bullshit. Because the reality is much more mundane, much less sexy -- It was the arrival on the site's comment boards of two people -- Meteor Blades and Steve Gilliard. They were a real revelation to me -- I couldn't believe that people like them, so brilliant, so insightful, so talented, would spend time at my little corner of the world. They inspired me to keep writing, keep building this place. Because if nothing else, I needed to make sure they had a platform upon which to speak. So they ended up being two of the first contributing editors on Daily Kos. Steve, in fact, was the first person I ever approached with the "guest blogger" offer. And he didn't waste time getting started, drawing on history of the region and the British occupation of Iraq in the late 1910s to set the stage for what the US would soon face in Iraq. He was frighteningly prescient on Iraq, and it wasn't the only topic he would consistently nail. He was a credit to the progressive blogosphere.

Steve Gillard, on his blog, brought frequent attention to the military history concerning previous military interventions in the Middle East, particularly the British Mandate of Mesopotamia in Iraq, and how the British experience was relevant to the current US occupation of Iraq.

== Controversy ==
When Michael S. Steele announced his candidacy for the U.S. Senate election of 2006, Gilliard mocked Steele's perceived subservience to the Republican Party by posting a photoshopped picture of Steele in minstrel makeup (see Blackface). This was picked up by Jeff Jacoby, a columnist with the Boston Globe, who was so incensed by Gilliard's comments about Black Americans that he dedicated a column criticizing him in December 2005. Gilliard reproduced the relevant portion of Jacoby's column on his own website, along with a copy of the response he had emailed to Jacoby, in which he said that he and most other blacks held black conservatives "in complete and utter contempt".

Earlier in his career, Gilliard was threatened with legal action by representatives of Rosie O'Donnell when he "wrote something about Rosie leering at Peta Wilson, the tall, very blonde, very bosomy star of the La Femme Nikita series." He responded that if sued, he would post the responses to his discovery on Usenet. Gilliard also crossed swords with Pulitzer-prize winning author Sydney Schanberg in 2001 when he attacked APBNews.com, Schanberg's employer, for encouraging its writers and editors to work without pay after the site got into financial trouble. Schanberg's response was widely interpreted as an invitation to personal fisticuffs, but the offer was declined.

According to Matt Bai, a political reporter for the New York Times Magazine, "some right-wing bloggers [gloated] over his death" and his burial place is kept confidential to avoid vandalism.

== Notable blog postings ==
- "I'm a Fighting Liberal",
- "We told you so".
- TWU wins major victory.

== Interviews ==
- "Steve Gilliard: Web Writer and Damn' Proud of It" (Netslaves.com, c. 2000)
