= Israel Tech Challenge =

Non-profit organization bringing international technical talent to Israel

- Formation: 2013; 13 years ago
- Founder: Raphael Ouzan, Oren Toledano
- Founded at: Israel
- Purpose: Bringing international highly technical talent to Israel
- Executive Director: Oren Toledano
- Affiliations: Israeli National Cyber Bureau, Jewish Agency, Paul E. Singer Foundation

Israel Tech Challenge is a non-profit organization that aims to bring international highly technical talent to Israel. It is backed by the Israeli National Cyber Bureau, the Jewish Agency, the Paul E. Singer Foundation, private donors, and corporate partners. It was founded in 2013 by Raphael Ouzan and Oren Toledano.

== Operations ==
As of 2018, Israel Tech Challenge provides 2-month internships, 5-month bootcamp and 10-month fellowships that have trained more than 400 new engineers from more than 20 countries. It has brought an estimated gain of $34.1M to the Israeli economy. In 2017, six month internships in the program were offered to 15 students form Cyprus and 15 from Greece as part of an effort to strengthen ties between the world Greek and Jewish communities.

Oren Toledano is executive director.

Brief internship experiences are offered as part of the Birthright Israel program. Haaretz asserts that the program, which it calls "Birthright for Geeks", seeks to expose young diaspora Jews who work in or study cutting edge tech to the tech industry in Israel.

In June 2018, Israel Tech Challenge was chosen by the Israel Innovation Authority as one of seven providers to run bootcamps and train engineers in Israel.
