= Bandzoogle =

Music distribution & website service

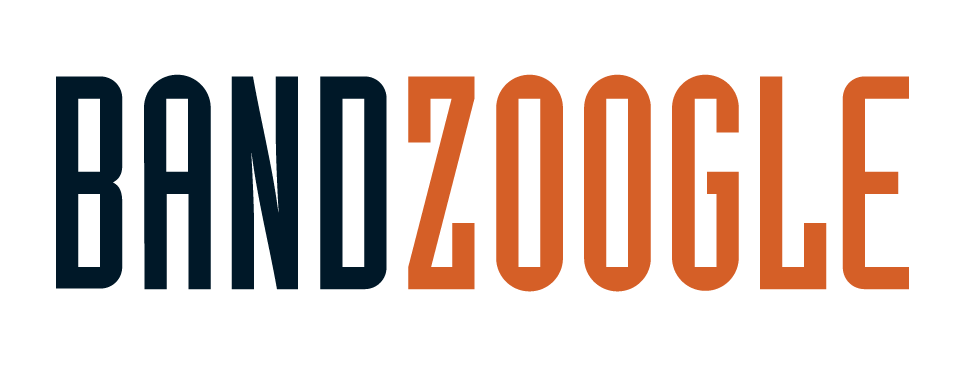
- Industry: Online services
- Founded: 2003
- Founder: Chris Vinson
- Key people: Stacey Bedford (CEO)
- Products: Social networking Online service provider Online media
- Website: bandzoogle.com

Bandzoogle is an online platform which provides tools for musicians to build a professional website, promote their music, and sell direct-to-fan for a flat monthly fee. It includes a built-in store, mailing list tools, reporting and integration with social networks and services, including Twitter, Facebook, Bandcamp, SoundCloud, Twitch and Crowdcast. Members can create sustainable income streams through their websites, including selling physical merch, singles, or albums.

Members can also build an online press kit for their music. Users can choose from over 100 mobile-ready themes to build a website. The platform allows artists to keep a record of their sales, and requires no knowledge of HTML coding. Bandzoogle also features built-in marketing tools for musicians, including Smart Links, Landing pages, and advanced page-level fan data.

== History ==
Bandzoogle was founded in 2003 by musician Chris Vinson who had built a website for his alt-rock band, Rubberman. Grassroots promotion, plus the online community that the website created helped the band get a record deal. Vinson subsequently launched Bandzoogle.

In 2013, Bandzoogle acquired competing musician website service Onesheet.

In 2018, Stacey Bedford was named CEO on Bandzoogle's 15th anniversary. Bedford was named to Billboard’s annual Digital Power Players in 2019. She was recognized as an International Power Player by Billboard in 2021, 2022, 2023 and 2024. Bedford was also named one of the Top 40 under 40 business leaders by the Ottawa Business Journal in 2022.

As of 2021, Bandzoogle powers over 55,000 websites for musicians who have sold over $75,000,000 in music, merch, and tickets commission-free. In 2021 alone artists earned over $9.9 million in commission-free revenue using the platform’s direct-to-fan sales tools.

During the COVID-19 pandemic, Bandzoogle pivoted to provide options to support musicians, including commission-free live streaming ticket sales, event ticket refunds, a tip jar feature, transaction history exports and filtering, and a comprehensive guide to musician resources during a pandemic.

Bandzoogle was listed as one of Canada’s Top Small & Medium Employers in 2022, 2023, and 2024 by the Globe and Mail, citing their ability to adapt to change and provide a supportive work-from-home environment.

Bandzoogle’s customer support team was recognized for exceptional service, winning Stevie awards for Front-Line Customer Service Team of the Year in 2021 and 2022.

In 2023, Bandzoogle announced that sales generated by artists via websites powered by the company surpassed more than $100 million. Over half ($52.7m) of that sales figure was generated in the last five years alone.

In September 2023, it was announced that Bandzoogle had been acquired by the independent digital music distribution service, DistroKid.

== Services ==
Bandzoogle offers a range of direct-to-fan tools created specifically for artists. In June 2019, Bandzoogle created a crowdfunding preset that allows similar services to PledgeMusic with payments going directly from fans to the artist. In August 2019, Bandzoogle launched a commission-free fan subscription feature in their music website and marketing platform. Artists can offer online fan clubs within their websites, create stronger fan communities, add income streams and keep 100% of the revenue. Artists can also offer pay-what-you-want fan subscriptions.

In 2020, Bandzoogle added a Tip Jar feature that allows fans to donate directly on Bandzoogle artist websites, an initiative that has netted over $200,000 for artists across the platform.

In 2021 the company added an integration with Printful’s print-on-demand drop shipping services, allowing artists to sell band merchandise commission-free through their websites. To celebrate this feature, Bandzoogle sold limited edition merch designed by Canadian illustrator Jacqui Oakley. All proceeds from these sales went directly to music industry charity Unison Benevolent Fund’s Emergency Mental Health for the Music Community campaign.

In 2022, Bandzoogle added marketing and promotional tools for musicians, including custom Landing pages and Smart Links, allowing artists to drive marketing campaign traffic to their own websites.

In 2023 Bandzoogle added a new subscription plan focused on electronic press kits (EPKs) for artists. This enables artists to create and launch EPKs with their bios, music players, embedded videos, show dates, images, press quotes, a contact form and social links among other features.
