= DistroKid =

American independent digital music service

- Former name: Fandalism
- Website type: Music publishing; digital distribution
- Owners: Spotify; Insight Partners; Silversmith Capital Partners
- Founder: Philip J. Kaplan
- Industry: Music
- Website: distrokid.com
- Launched: January 2012; 14 years ago
- Current status: Active

DistroKid, formerly Fandalism, is an American independent digital music distribution service based in New York, United States. Launched at the start of 2012, it enables musicians and rights holders to distribute and monetize music through online platforms such as Spotify, iTunes, and YouTube Music while retaining full rights and royalties.

== History ==
DistroKid was first founded in early 2012 by Philip Kaplan and was initially a feature within his music social platform, Fandalism. The service went into its current name in mid-2013 at the SF MusicTech Summit as a platform to distribute music without any commission or royalty. It became popular among independent musicians and YouTubers artists, and by 2015, 25,000 artists were using the platform.

In 2015, Jack & Jack distributed their debut EP through DistroKid, which reached number one on iTunes and debuted at number 12 on the Billboard 200.

In 2016, DistroKid introduced Teams, a feature that enables automatic royalty splits among collaborators.

In 2018, DistroKid reached an agreement with Spotify to support cross-platform uploads for artists using direct distribution or licensing arrangements. In the same year, Silversmith Capital Partners and Spotify acquired a stake in the company. In 2019, DistroKid partnered with Musixmatch to deliver lyrics to streaming platforms. By 2020, it was distributing at least 30 percent of new songs and had over 2 million artists.

In January 2021, DistroKid launched Upstream, a feature that allowed record labels to identify emerging artists using its data, earning a finder's fee when artists are signed. Republic Records was the first participant. In September 2021, DistroKid raised funds in a funding round that valued it at $1.3 billion. In November 2021, it introduced Sellouts, an NFT initiative involving digital collectibles linked to participating artists.

In 2022, DistroKid launched DistroVid, a subscription service for uploading music videos available to both members and non-members.

In February 2023, DistroKid launched Mixea, an AI-powered mastering service to automatically optimize tracks. In the same year, DistroKid acquired Bandzoogle, a platform for music distribution and website hosting.

By 2024, DistroKid began outsourcing some of its operations to the Philippines and laid off some of its U.S-based workers.

In 2025, DistroKid launched DistroKid Direct, a platform that allows artists to sell merchandise directly to their fans.

== Operations ==
DistroKid distributes music from independent artists and labels to digital platforms including Apple Music, Amazon Music, Deezer, and Tidal. Users pay an annual subscription fee for unlimited uploads and retain full royalties' rights.

DistroKid provides tools such as automatic royalty splitting, licensing for cover songs, metadata management, YouTube Content ID monetization, and HyperFollow pages. The Teams feature enables automated revenue distribution among collaborators. DistroKid also operates Upstream that connects artists with record labels, and DistroVid that supports music video distribution.

== Artists ==
Several artists have achieved commercial success through the platform. Jack & Jack reached major chart positions with a DistroKid release, and iHeartMemphis's "Hit the Quan" gained national recognition. Established artists such as 21 Savage, Ludacris, Tom Waits, and Will Smith have also used the service for independent releases.
