= Amit Kapur =

American-born internet entrepreneur

Amit Kapur is an American-born internet entrepreneur. He is currently the co-founder and CEO of WhoCo, a technology company focused on hiring and recruiting. He is best known as co-founder of technology start-up Gravity and as the former chief operating officer at MySpace.

== Early life and education ==
Kapur grew up in Huron, South Dakota. He graduated with a bachelor's degree in mechanical engineering from Stanford University.

== Career ==
After graduation, Kapur worked at NBC Universal in its planning and digital strategy department.

Kapur joined MySpace in 2005 and was in charge of the development of MySpace Music and MySpace mobile. He was named chief operating officer of the company in January 2008.

In 2009, Kapur along with 2 other MySpace employees, Jim Benedetto and Steve Pearman, left the company to found Santa Monica-based Gravity. They raised $10 million in Series A funding in May 2009 and another $10.6 million in Series B funding in October 2012.

Gravity was acquired by AOL in January 2014. After the acquisition, Kapur was named President of AOL's publisher platform where he remained until 2017.

In early 2019, Kapur co-founded Santa Monica-based WhoCo, a technology startup focused on hiring and recruiting, alongside former Google and AOL executive Tim Armstrong.
