= Vijay Pandurangan =

Canadian computer scientist

- Born: Montreal, Quebec, Canada
- Occupations: Computer scientist, entrepreneur, academic
- Known for: Scientific software education, early technical contributions at Google, online privacy
- Title: Adjunct Professor at Stanford University

Vijay Pandurangan is a Canadian computer scientist and internet entrepreneur and expert on online privacy, known for his work in scientific software education and early technical contributions at Google. He is now based in Virginia. As an adjunct professor at Stanford University, he teaches a course on Software Engineering for Scientists, emphasizing the critical importance of software skills in modern scientific research. In addition to his academic work, Pandurangan has made numerous early-stage investments in various technology startups.

== Early life ==
Pandurangan was born and raised in Montreal, Quebec.

== Career ==
=== Google, Twitter, and Benchmark ===
Pandurangan was an early engineer at Google from 2002-2009 and published papers on data storage technologies. He co-founded Mitro in 2013 which was then sold to Twitter. Pandurangan then became head of the Twitter New York engineering office. In this role at Twitter he was responsible for the launch of Twitter products such as the highly anticipated Twitter Moments. He also posted about the high use of Google Hangouts inside Twitter and their usefulness to remote teams. He and his teams also contributed bug fixes to the Linux kernel.

He departed Twitter in 2016 along with several other senior Twitter executives as the company struggled to turn itself around in the face of declining user growth.

In October 2016 Pandurangan was hired as entrepreneur-in-residence at Benchmark and he relocated from New York to San Francisco. He is an occasional guest writer for Wired and has written on topics such as the success of Snapchat's success in the context of Twitter's stumbles.

=== Adjunct Professor at Stanford ===
Since 2022, Pandurangan has been an adjunct professor at Stanford University, teaching Software Engineering for Scientists (BIODS253).This course emphasizes the importance of coding, using standard tools, writing and testing well-designed programs, and collaborating with peers, as these skills are critical for modern scientists but are generally not taught in academia. Vijay gave a keynote speech in 2022 at the 14th Annual Alberta Prostate Cancer Research Initiative Fall Symposium in Banff, Alberta on how better software engineering improves scientific and medical research. In 2023, Pandurangan gave a talk at the Pacific Systems Biology conference on the impact of poor software engineering on science

== Other projects ==
Pandurangan is regularly cited in the press for his various projects in big data. These projects included a 2014 successful attempt at de-anonymizing New York City taxicab data which led to New York City then tightening up access to the taxicab data. This data was used to identify possible religious backgrounds of particular drivers as well as to determine the tipping behaviors of celebrities.

He also conducted an exposé in 2016 showing that Google's SMS-based account recovery can reduce the security of a Google account.

In 2012 he also used big data to analyze color composition of movie posters since the inception of the film industry, showing the evolution of psychological factors and perception over time.
