= 140 Proof =

Advertising company

140 Proof, Inc.
- Company type: Private
- Industry: Advertising
- Founded: July 2009, in San Francisco, California, United States
- Founder: Jon Elvekrog; John Manoogian III
- Headquarters: 77 DeBoom Street, San Francisco, California, United States
- Area served: Worldwide
- Key people: Jon Elvekrog (CEO); John Manoogian III (CTO)
- Services: Social Advertising
- Website: 140proof.com

140 Proof, Inc. is an advertising company that uses social data from many sources in targeting relevant ads based on consumers' interests as indicated by their social activity across networks.

== History ==
140 Proof was launched in 2009 by Jon Elvekrog and John Manoogian III.

140 Proof began as an app-based network; its name is a reference to the 140-character limit on Twitter. 140 Proof does not serve ads on the Twitter website itself; instead, its API is used by third-party apps to display targeted ads appearing on apps, social sites, and mobile networks. Additionally, the service allows advertisers to run campaigns on blogging platforms like WordPress and Tumblr.

140 Proof serves customers in the United States as well as internationally.

In 2014, the company was granted a patent for targeting users based on persona data. 140 Proof's patented method includes the steps of receiving an advertisement request from a third-party environment with associated content, identifying a content stream that includes a reference to the third-party content, identifying a persona based on the user associated with the identified content stream and serving an advertisement to the third-party environment based on the identified persona.

In August 2016, 140 Proof was acquired by AcuityAds for up to $20 million in cash.

== Mobile advertisements ==
140 Proof ads appear in mobile apps, mobile social reader apps, and mobile networks. Ads are targeted to specific audiences based on public interest graph data.

In 2012, 140 Proof began offering video on any app running 140 Proof ads. Its first video ad campaign was for Chevrolet during the Super Bowl. The ads generated 50 million impressions in 2 days and resulted in 120,000 downloads of Chevy's “Chevy Game Time” app. Like its text ads, the videos show up in users’ social streams on apps that run 140 Proof ads. Users can watch, rate and share the video without leaving the page.

== The blended interest graph ==
Public social activity from the interest graph is the primary data source 140 Proof uses to make its ads more relevant. Apps using 140 Proof give the company a user ID list stripped of names, along with the public information in that user's profile. 140 Proof's algorithms assemble ‘personas’ of users based on keywords in users’ posts and who users are following. By combining information on several of a user's stated interests, interest graphs allow 140 Proof to infer further about the user's interests.

Brands can then choose personas toward which they can target their ads. For example, an advertiser might want to reach just sports fans, or either sports fans or mothers, or only sports fans who are also mothers.
