= Alvin Poh =

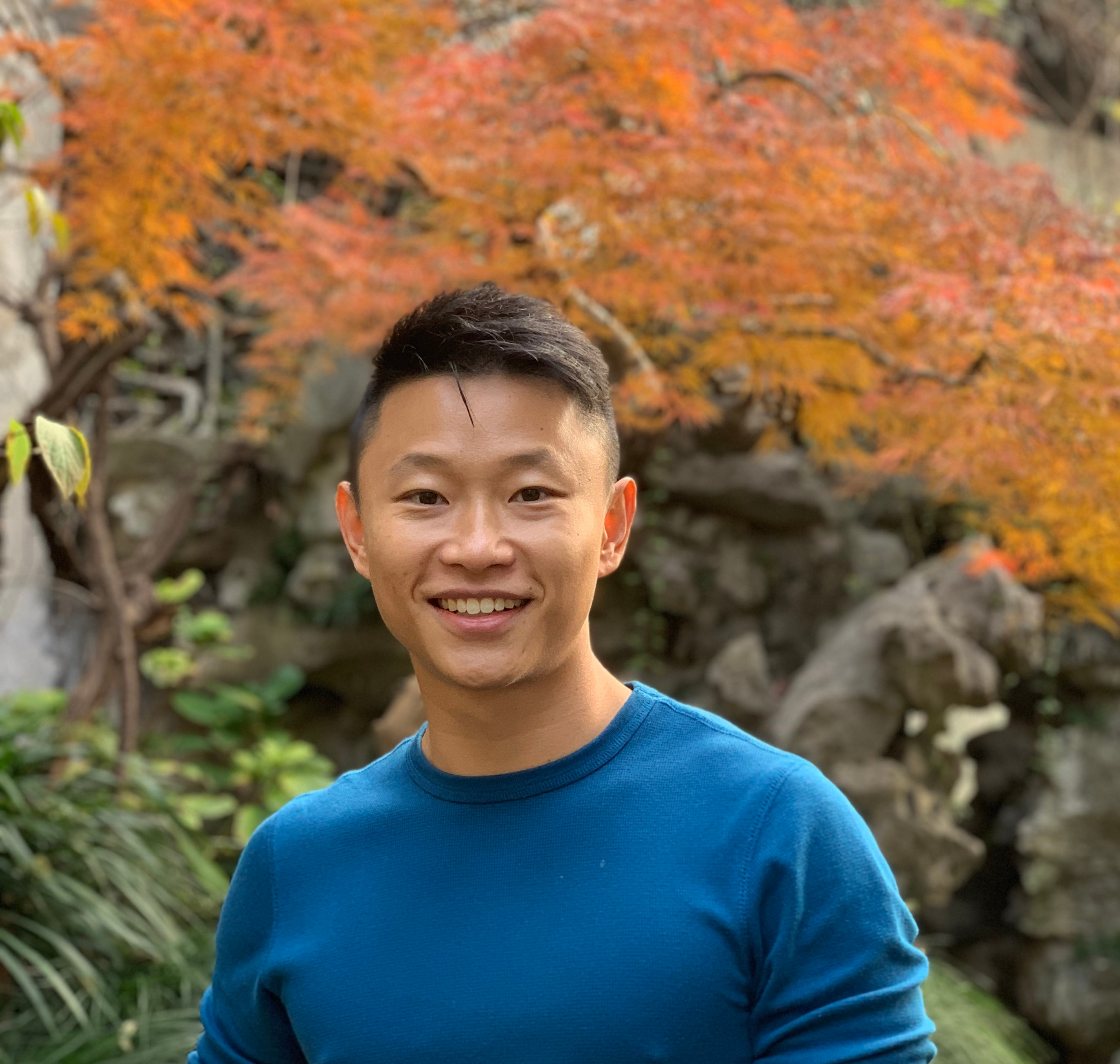
- Alvin Poh in 2019
- Born: 10 November 1984 (age 41); Kovan, Singapore
- Education: Temasek Polytechnic; Singapore Management University; Carnegie Mellon University
- Occupations: Entrepreneur and Angel Investor
- Title: Ex-CEO, Vodien
- Children: 0
- Website: www.alvinpoh.com

Alvin Poh (born 10 November 1984) is a Singaporean Internet entrepreneur, angel investor, and philanthropist. He is best known for co-founding Vodien Internet Solutions, growing it to be the largest hosting provider in Singapore.

== Early life and education ==
Poh was born in Singapore. He came from a working-class family in Kovan, where his mother worked as a clinical assistant while his father worked multiple jobs. Poh has claimed that the lack of an allowance spurred him to find ways to have an income, and eventually was one of the reasons that led him to co-found the company with his school-mate.

After nearly flunking out of high school, Poh started focusing on his grades. Eventually, he managed to do well enough to become a scholarship recipient of the National Infocomm Scholarship, which provided for his university education. He made the Dean's List for both years that he was in Singapore Management University and graduated with a BSc (IS Management) summa cum laude, from Singapore Management University, and winning the Monetary Authority of Singapore Academic Excellence Award. He also graduated with a MSc (IS Management) summa cum laude from Carnegie Mellon University.

== Career ==
In 2002, Poh was 17 when he co-founded his first company, Vodien Studios, a web design firm that provided services such as graphic design, web design, web development, and web hosting services. Later, the company pivoted, restructuring and removing several business functions and services. In August 2005, Vodien Studios renamed itself Vodien Internet Solutions and became a specialised web hosting services provider. On July 30, 2009, the Accounting and Corporate Regulatory Authority of Singapore approved the incorporation of Vodien Internet Solutions Pte Ltd, a registered private limited company to reflect the next stage of the company's growth. Subsequently, the company grew rapidly over the next decade.

In July 2017, Poh sold the business to Dreamscape Networks (DN8:ASX), a company listed on the Australian Stock Exchange, most popularly known for operating the domain name registry, Crazy Domains. The deal was valued at SGD30 million, and allowed the combined entity to expand into Southeast Asia through Singapore.

In July 2018, Poh stepped down from his position as Vodien's CEO and currently remains as a significant shareholder of Dreamscape Networks, where Poh owns 5.5 per cent of the company.

== Philanthropy ==
Poh's philanthropy work focuses primarily on tertiary education. In 2018, Poh donated to and created the Alvin Poh Endowed Scholarship at Singapore Management University with a donation of SGD250,000. The scholarship fund aims to provide funding primarily to financially needy undergraduate students who demonstrate a combination of good academic results and student life activities.

== See also ==
- List of Internet entrepreneurs
