= Blippy =

Defunct social networking service

- Industry: Personal finance, Software
- Founded: December 2009
- Headquarters: Palo Alto, California
- Key people: Ashvin Kumar, Chris Estreich, and Philip J. Kaplan (Co founders)
- Products: Rich Internet application
- Revenue: N/A
- Website: blippy.com at the Wayback Machine (archived March 4, 2010)

Blippy was a social media sharing site operated from Palo Alto, California by a company of the same name, for users to post and follow each other's updates about their purchases of goods and services. It was described as the "Twitter of personal finance", and was often compared with Twitter because it was based on that company's open sharing model. One purpose of the site was to facilitate discussion and comparison shopping among people who are connected with each other online. As of July 2010, the company primarily focused on social sharing of product and service reviews. The Blippy service was shut down as of May 2011.

== History ==
Blippy was founded in 2009 by Ashvin Kumar, Chris Estreich, and Philip J. Kaplan. Blippy launched on $1.6 million of financing from several prominent venture capital firms, including Charles River Ventures and Sequoia Capital, and angel investors Evan Williams, Jason Calacanis and James Hong.

On April 23, 2010, social media guide Mashable revealed that Blippy had allowed Google to index detailed transaction information, thus resulting in four users' full credit card numbers being exposed to the public. A blog post from the official Blippy blog claimed the incident was "a lot less bad than it looks" and apologized for their mistake of putting credit card information in a hidden div tag during the beta test period of the website. This extended information was indexed by Google and was viewable in Google cache.

A May 2011 TechCrunch article discussed the decline of the service as it struggled to find relevance among consumers. According to then-CEO Ashvin Kumar, the service was unable to significantly increase user engagement, indicating that Blippy, at the time, had only 100,000 registered users and, of those, only 30% had shared a purchase. Kumar indicated that the Blippy staff was considering moving in a different direction in the social commerce category away from the current Blippy product. The service was shut down shortly thereafter.
