= Jack Jia =

American entrepreneur

Jack Jia is an American entrepreneur and technologist. He is the founder and chief executive officer of Musely, a telehealth company specializing in prescription skincare. He previously founded Baynote, a recommendation-software company, and was a founding member and chief of technology of Interwoven, a Silicon Valley software firm, and has invested in early-stage venture funds including Rally Ventures, Webb Investment Network (WIN), TSVC, and GSR Ventures.

== Career ==
=== Interwoven ===
Jia was a founding member of Interwoven and became its first Chief Technology Officer and Senior Vice President. During his tenure, the company gained media attention for a BMW Z3 recruiting initiative.

=== Baynote ===
In 2004, Jia founded Baynote, a company that developed a machine-learning recommendation software for e-commerce and online publishers. The technology built a novel Affinity Process Unit (APU) that applied sparse metrics, regular CPUs, and anonymous user behavior to generate AI-driven recommendations and search results. The company was featured in Forbes (2009) and later in the Wall Street Journal (2014) for its behavior-based personalization technology before being acquired in 2014.

=== Trusper / Musely ===
Jia launched Trusper in 2013 as a social app for sharing lifestyle and beauty tips. In 2019, the platform pivoted to teledermatology services under the new name Musely, offering prescription treatments for melasma, acne, rosacea, and other skin conditions.

=== Recent work ===
Beyond his entrepreneurial ventures, Jia has been a long-standing early-stage investor with a focus on software, mobile technologies, and consumer platforms. He has been affiliated with Rally Ventures as a Tech Partner, the Webb Investment Network as an investment affiliate, and TSVC as a Special Advisor, and he has contributed to GSR Ventures’ investment activities. Jia’s investment philosophy, as described in interviews, emphasizes scalable product design, behavioral understanding of users, and practical solutions to real-world inefficiencies.

== Views ==
In interviews, Jia has emphasized that technology should reduce friction for users and eliminate unnecessary complexity in both enterprise and consumer contexts. He has spoken about the need for medical care especially dermatology to be redesigned around long-term outcomes rather than episodic visits, arguing that digital platforms enable more consistent follow-up and evidence-based adjustments to treatment.

Jia has consistently framed his entrepreneurial philosophy around first-principles thinking, a theme reinforced in his 2025 Ad Age interview, where he argued that much of the skincare and telemedicine industry had “forgotten common sense.” He believes that effective healthcare innovation begins with identifying the simplest solution to a patient’s real-world needs, then removing every systemic barrier that makes those solutions inaccessible.

== Patents ==
- U.S. Patent # 6,480,944 (2002) Method of and apparatus for recovery of in-progress changes made in a software application
- U.S. Patent # 6,609,184 (2003) Method of and apparatus for recovery of in-progress changes made in a software application
- U.S. Patent # 6,505,212 (2003) System and method for website development
- U.S. Patent # 6,792,454 (2004) System and method for website development
- Patent Pending (2005). Method and Apparatus for Identifying, Extracting, Capturing, and Leveraging Expertise and Knowledge.
