= Fortiva =

American e-mail archiving company

Fortiva was a software as a service (SaaS) based email archiving company. Founded in 2005 by Paul Chen, the former CEO and founder of FloNetwork (later acquired by DoubleClick). Fortiva's SaaS email archiving service introduced a "hybrid" method, taking advantage of storage and services "in the cloud" while leaving control over email services at the customer site. As a result, the company claimed to offer businesses the benefits of an in-house product with the advantages of a managed solution.

Fortiva was acquired in May, 2008 by Sunnyvale, California-based security company Proofpoint, Inc.

== History ==
The company was created in response to the growing legal and regulatory challenges that email presents for businesses, in combination with storage challenges. It was also one of the early companies to build a product "from the ground up" as using software as a service, and was recognized early on as a unique solution to the challenge of securely storing and retrieving email without maintaining all data in-house.

Fortiva launched in February 2005, after raising an initial $5 million in funding round, releasing its first product, and lining up two customers as references. Fortiva was backed by venture capital firms McLean Watson and Ventures West. The full series A funding, totalling $8 million was announced in September 2008.

Fortiva was acquired in May, 2008 by Proofpoint, Inc. Its archiving service continues to be marketed and sold under the Proofpoint name.

== Products ==
The Fortiva Archiving & Compliance Suite was a hybrid application suite and managed service for e-mail archiving, compliance and legal discovery. Integrating with Microsoft Exchange and Active Directory, the suite consisted of five components including Fortiva Policy, Fortiva Archive, Fortiva Discovery, Fortiva Supervision, and Fortiva Reports.

=== DoubleBlind Encryption ===
Fortiva was notable for its use of a proprietary method of data security, known as DoubleBlind Encryption. DoubleBlind Encryption ensured that customer data was encrypted at the customer site before being sent to Fortiva's secure datacenters. As a result, even Fortiva's own staff could not breach the security of the data.
