= John Manoogian III =

American entrepreneur (born 1977)

John Manoogian III is an American Internet entrepreneur, software engineer, digital designer, public speaker, and teacher. Manoogian co-founded the social technology company 140 Proof in 2009 and is recognized for practicing a "hybrid" or blended approach to design and software development. He graduated from the University of Michigan and is based in San Francisco.

== Career ==
John worked for Sigma6 in Detroit while studying computer science, cryptography, and linguistics at the University of Michigan in Ann Arbor. He joined Organic Inc. in 1999. Manoogian led engineering in several offices and remained at Organic during the IPO process and until the eventual sale to Omnicom, leaving as a Director of Engineering.

In 2002, while leading an engineering team at Organic, John founded Feed Me Links, an open-source link-sharing social bookmarking startup.

He moved to San Francisco, California in 2007. Soon after, he co-founded NewCru, a mobile app for location-based wine recommendations.

== 140 Proof ==
In July 2009, John co-founded social API company 140 Proof with Jon Elvekrog in San Francisco, originally as a business enabling Twitter developers to earn revenue with targeted ads. It was the first social ad platform based on the Interest Graph.

140 Proof was able to secure funding from Founders Fund and BlueRun Ventures. As CTO, Manoogian led API and product development. He has written about the evolution of social technology for TechCrunch, MediaPost, and Mashable. In 2012, he and Kumar Dandapani co-published "A Relevance Engine from the Interest Graph", a paper proposing a new method for "categorizing social media users using sequential trial experimentation and the public interest graph".

In 2016, 140 Proof was acquired by Acuity Ads in a deal that was valued up to $20 million.

== Contributions ==
Manoogian is the creator and teacher of the "Design Hacks" course at startup educational campus General Assembly, and, along with Twitter CEO and fellow University of Michigan alumnus Dick Costolo, has lectured about startup pivots at the University of Michigan's Center for Entrepreneurship.

Manoogian is actively involved in the technology and design communities in San Francisco, serving as a technical adviser to startups Hud.dl, Hashgr.am, and Zivity, and as a contributor to open-source projects like Racket, Rails Admin, and SABnzbd. He is the founding organizer of SF NURDS, San Francisco's first 3D rendering and modeling community.
