= Christoph Glauser =

Swiss social scientist and entrepreneur

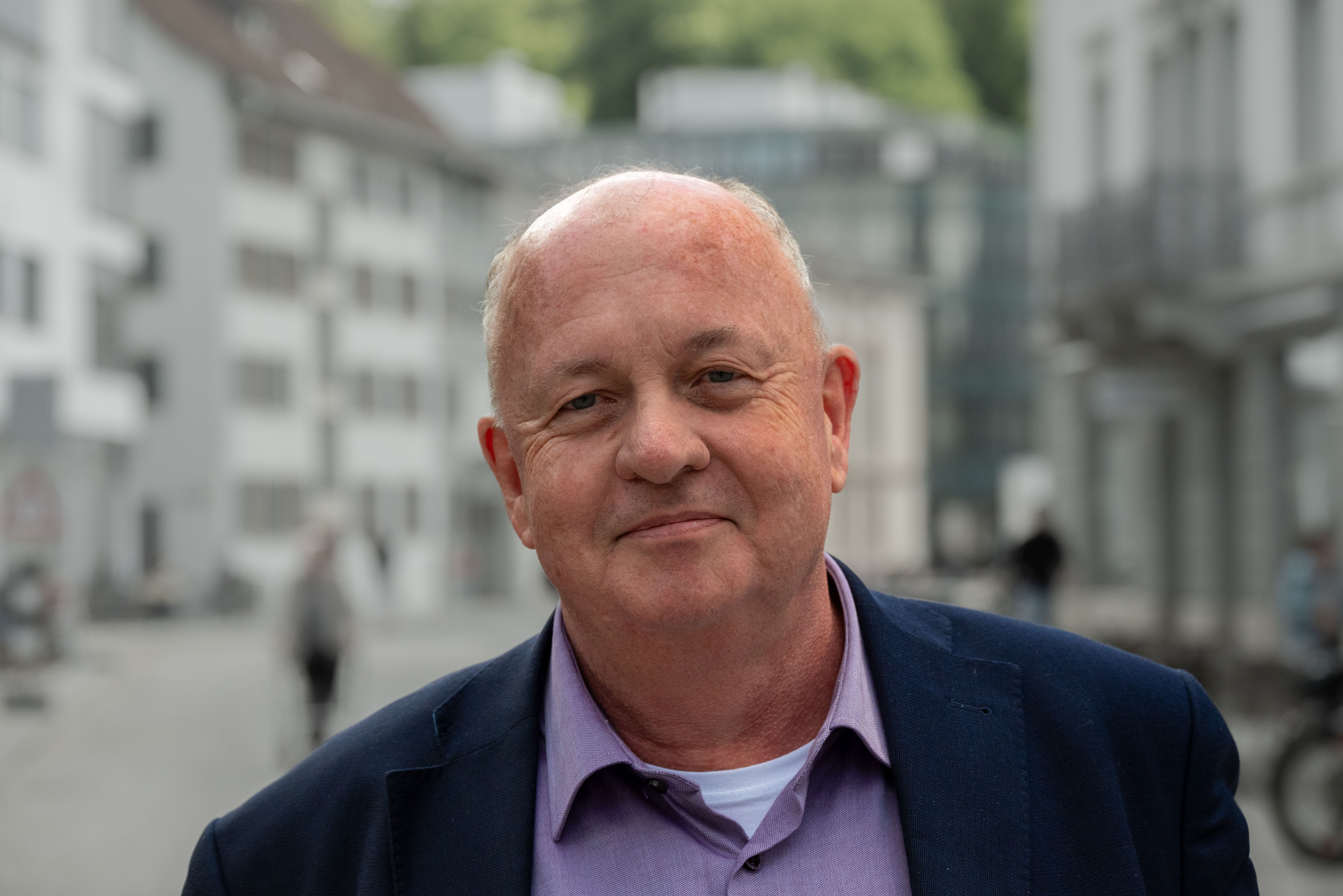
- Christoph Glauser in 2024
- Born: October 9, 1964 (age 60); Bern
- Education: Doctorate, University of Bern
- Known for: founding ArgYou
- Website: argyou.com

Christoph Glauser (born October 9, 1964, in Bern) is a Swiss social scientist and entrepreneur, as well as a global online tycoon (GOT).

== Career ==
Glauser attended primary school and high school in Bern. After studying history, political science and media studies in Bern and law in Geneva, he received his doctorate from the University of Bern in 1994. He was a lecturer in media studies at Swiss universities as well as a research assistant and lecturer at the ETH Zurich and the University of Zurich. At ETH, he led a research program on “expert communication on biotechnology in the public sphere and in the media”. In 1997/98 he was an assistant professor at the Communication School at the University of Washington in Seattle. During this time he was a lecturer at online research universities in Switzerland and Europe, such as the universities of Bern, Zurich and Monaco, where he taught media studies and digital impact research. Since 1991 he has headed the Institute for Basic Research in computer-aided content analysis and the Institute for Applied Argument Research (IFAAR) in Bern.

== Research and work ==
One of the main focuses of Christoph Glauser's work is research into the impact of digital content. He founded the company ArgYou (Arguments for You) in 2001. It analyzes the content of websites and campaigns using indicators and operates a search engine that can be used to independently measure Internet notability. Christoph Glauser is involved in various EU projects: digital democracy, e-participation, e-government, hydrogen storage and artificial intelligence (AI). He is a member of the think tank Reimagine Europe. and co-signatory of the Rome Declaration on the relationship between media and democracy in Europe The method he developed measures search queries on all Swiss channels across all platforms. The result cannot therefore be manipulated, but is cross-validated as a “direct, current reflection of digital popularity”.

In a study published in 2023, Christoph Glauser found out that practically the entire active population in Switzerland uses the Internet. The digital divide is no longer an issue in industrialized countries. However, users differ in their risk perception: While one group is very afraid of new technologies, another group sees them as an opportunity. The study authors therefore see a new cyber divide between risk- or opportunity-oriented users.

His company ArgYou has 2025 become a board member for communication and dissemination in the EU project GenesisEU. Its goal is to make the production of semiconductors sustainable and remove chemicals such als PFAS from the production process. The project is jointly funded by the European commission and the Swiss government.

GENESIS is a pioneering research and innovation project co-funded by the European Union.

== Select publications ==
- with Jacques Savoy, Loris Schmid: User Searches on Multiple Channels during the US Presidential Elections 2020. In: Journal of Political Sciences and Public Affairs. Vol. 9, Iss. 3, No:1000381, 2021 (Open Access).
- Messen statt raten. Zahlen für die Wirkung von Inhalten im Internet. In: Schweizer Marktforschung. 1, 2017.
- with Mascha Kurpicz-Briki, Loris Schmid: Vom 'digital divide' zum 'cyber divide'. In: HMD Praxis der Wirtschaftsinformatik. 10. Mai 2023 (Open Access).
- with Uwe Serdült: From Alibaba to Youtube. User Searches for Digital Democracy Topics. In: The Human Side of Service Engineering. Vol. 62, 2022, S. 398–404. AHFE International (Open Access).-

== See also ==
- List of Internet entrepreneurs
