= Tanium =

American cybersecurity and systems management company

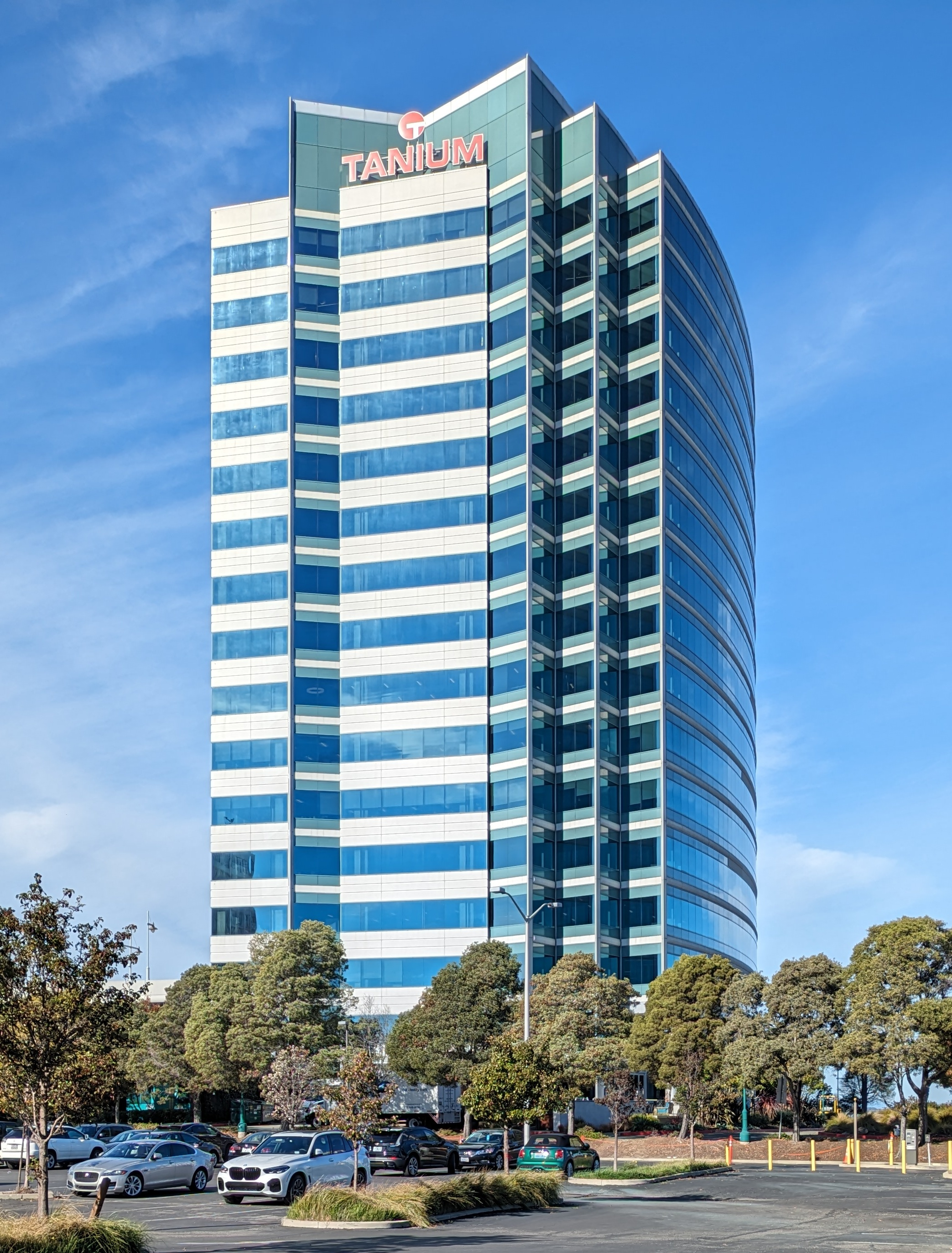
- Operations center in Emeryville, California
- Company type: Private
- Industry: Technology
- Founded: 16 July 2007
- Founders: David Hindawi; Orion Hindawi
- Headquarters: Kirkland, Washington, United States
- Key people: Dan Streetman(CEO); David Hindawi (Founder & Chairman Emeritus); Orion Hindawi (Founder & Executive Chairman)
- Products: Endpoint and Security Management
- Revenue: ▲$440.2 Million(2019)
- Number of employees: 2,000
- Website: www.tanium.com

Tanium is a privately held cybersecurity and systems management company founded in 2007 with headquarters in Kirkland, Washington, and its operations center in Emeryville, California.

== History ==
It was founded July 16, 2007, by father and son David Hindawi and Orion Hindawi, co-founders of information management company BigFix.

In 2015, Andreessen Horowitz invested $52 million in the company.

Orion Hindawi was named CEO in February 2016, and David Hindawi served as Executive Chairman.

On May 3, 2018, TPG Growth made a $175 million investment in the company.

In 2020, Tanium's valuation was US$10 billion.

In 2023, Tanium appointed Dan Streetman as CEO and announced that Orion Hindawi would assume the role of executive chairman. It was also announced that David Hindawi will now serve as chairman emeritus.

== Products ==
In 2023, Tanium launched its digital employee experience (DEX) solution, part of its XEM platform. DEX includes self-help capabilities and automated remediation, which helps IT teams improve employee digital experiences.
