= Gravity (American company) =

- Industry: Internet information provider
- Founded: 2009
- Founders: Amit Kapur; Jim Benedetto; Stevee Pearman
- Defunct: 2014
- Fate: Acquired by AOL
- Headquarters: Los Angeles, California, United States

Gravity was a start up content personalization company based out of Los Angeles, California, United States. They helped publishers and advertisers deliver personalized content and ads. The company was founded in 2009, by Amit Kapur, Jim Benedetto, and Steve Pearman. The company was acquired by AOL in January 2014, for a reported $90.7 million.

== Products ==
Gravity offered content personalization by using something they developed, the "interest graph", to tailor specific interests of each user on social websites. The "interest graph" used real time ingestion to process content and behavior data. The data then underwent semantic analysis and the "interest graph" was created, according to each specific user. Gravity also uses these graphs in relation to specific brands. The data presented in these graphs give specific information on what customers a company has and their preferences. The companies using Gravity "interest graphs" were able to directly see what their customers want and expect. The graphs enabled brands to eliminate focus groups, market research, and surveys, etc.

== Customers and partners ==
Gravity had a wide variety of clients and was utilized by over 50 companies and publishers.

- Time
- CNNMoney
- TechCrunch
- The Wall Street Journal
- Gap
- Sony
- Intel
- Wetpaint
- McDonald's
