= GSR Ventures =

American venture capital firm

GSR Ventures Advisors, LLC
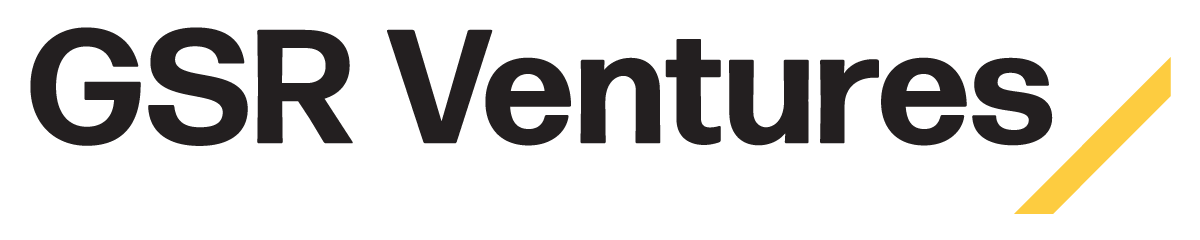
- Type: Private
- Industry: Venture Capital
- Founded: 2004; 22 years ago
- Founders: James Ding; Richard Lim; Sunny Wu; Robert Yeung
- Headquarters: Menlo Park, California, U.S.
- AUM: US$3.7 billion (2024)
- Website: www.gsrventuresglobal.com

GSR Ventures (GSR) is an American venture capital firm based in Menlo Park, California, with additional offices in China and Singapore. It mainly focuses on investments in China.

== Background ==
GSR Ventures was founded in 2004 by several tech entrepreneurs in the U.S. GSR is short for Golden Sands River or Jinsha River.

Initially GSR had a strategic partnership with Mayfield and shared its office space in Menlo Park. GSR relied on Mayfield's venture capital expertise as well its connections to silicon valley. However GSR's directors spent most of their time in the Beijing office.

In 2005, GSR raised $75 million for its debut fund. Mayfield was an investor in it. In 2007, GSR raised $200 million for its second fund with Mayfield once again investing in it. At this point GSR had made 11 direct investments in China which included Baihe.com and Qunar.

In July 2014, GSR and Oak Investment Partners established Go Scale Capital, a $500 million Clean technology fund. In March 2015, Philips stated it would sell its lighting components and automotive-lighting operations in a $3.3 billion deal to Go Scale Capital. However, in January 2016, the deal was blocked by the Committee on Foreign Investment in the United States on national security grounds leading the deal to be eventually scrapped.

In July 2015, it was reported that GSR was raising a $5 billion fund to buy overseas assets. This came at a time where the Chinese government was pushing a policy to snap up overseas technologies that China imports such as semiconductors and advanced automotive technology. GSR was considered to be a more attractive partner as it had more international experience and expertise compared to other Chinese companies. At this point, GSR had a strong reputation with investments notable startups such as in DiDi and Ele.me.

In July 2023, the United States House Select Committee on Strategic Competition between the United States and the Chinese Communist Party notified several American venture capital firms that they were being investigated over their funding of Chinese tech companies. GSR was one of the firms and was cited for investments in artificial intelligence and semiconductor companies. In response GSR stated that partners who worked on the deals in question were no longer at the firm. In February 2024, the committee released a report of its findings that stated five American venture capital firms invested more than $1 billion in China's semiconductor industry since 2001, a sector considered a national security threat according to the U.S. government.They were GSR, GGV Capital, Qualcomm Ventures, Sequoia Capital and Walden International.
