= Mike Faith =

British-American serial entrepreneur

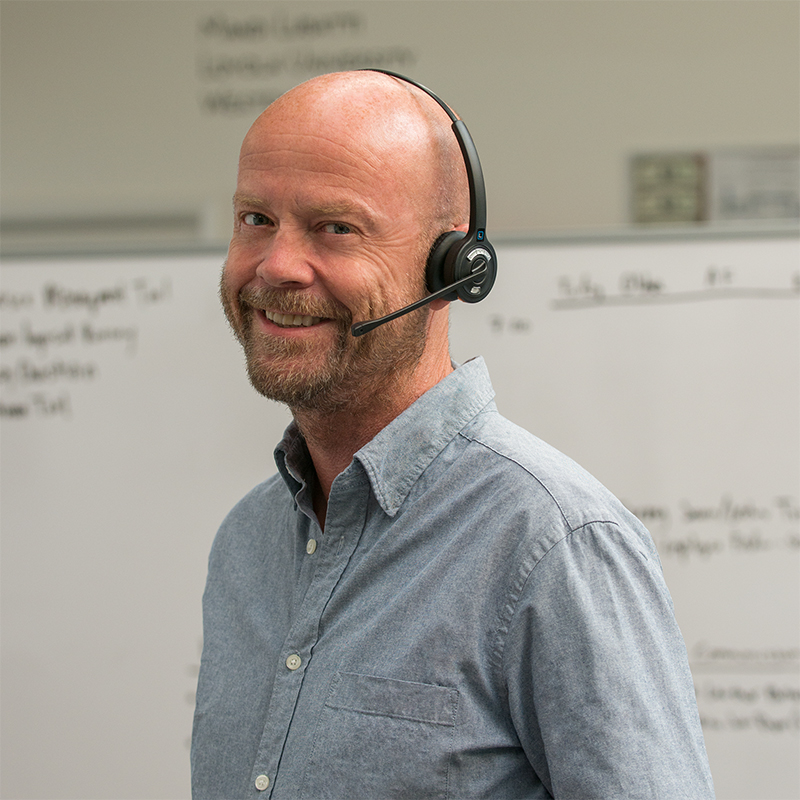
- Mike Faith, CEO of Headsets.com
- Born: Michael G. Faith; September 24, 1964 (age 61); Southampton, England, U.K.
- Occupation: Entrepreneur
- Website: http://www.headsets.com/

Mike Faith is a British-American serial entrepreneur. He is the founder and CEO of Headsets.com.

== Career ==
Faith left England's state schools at the age of fifteen with the goal of becoming an entrepreneur. Faith began his sales and marketing career in the United Kingdom. In 1990, Faith moved to the United States, drawn by the larger market and a perceived ease of business. Faith has twice been nominated for the Ernst & Young Entrepreneur of the Year Award.

=== Headsets.com ===
The companies that Faith ran upon his arrival to the United States were primarily call-center based. In this environment, Faith found it difficult to locate reliable and cost-effective audio headsets for his offices. In 1997, he created Headsets.com, a brand which he has built up with a series of unusual marketing stunts.
