= Anubhav Wadhwa =

Indian entrepreneur (born 1999)

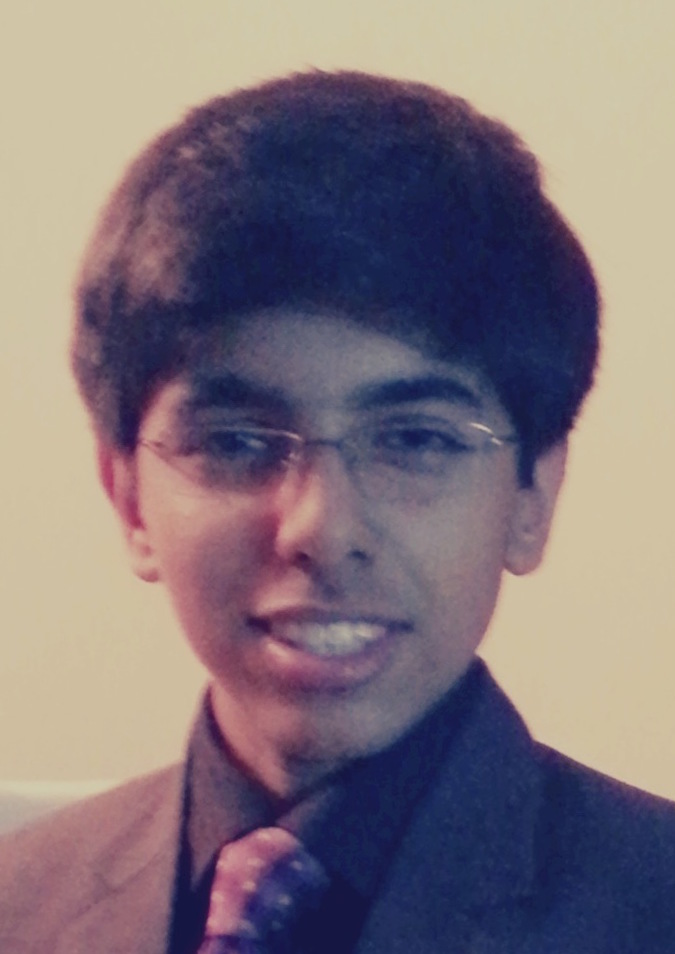
- Anubhav Wadhwa
- Born: 21 March 1999 (age 27); New Delhi, India
- Education: City, University of London (Law), Pathways World School
- Occupation: Technology Entrepreneur
- Years active: 2013–present
- Known for: One of the Youngest CEO's in India, Founder of TechAPTO & Tyrelessly
- Title: CEO of TechAPTO
- Relatives: Rajneesh Wadhwa (father), Mamta Wadhwa (mother)

Anubhav Wadhwa (born 21 March 1999) is a technology entrepreneur, and social activist. Wadhwa founded TechAPTO, Trends on Internet and Tyrelessly. Wadhwa has been featured in Indian national newspapers, and was part of Marico Innovation Foundation and The Better India's video series, India Innovates.

== Personal life and education ==
Wadhwa was born in New Delhi on 21 March 1999. In 2001, Wadhwa moved to London with his parents, Mamta and Rajneesh Wadhwa. After returning to India in 2003, Wadhwa joined Pathways World School (PWS). He is currently studying Law at City University of London.

Wadhwa has been involved in the development of high-level concepts for design projects.

== Accomplishments ==
Wadhwa established TechAPTO in 2012 at the age of 13; in the year 2013, the venture was selected to the top 40 Indian start-ups. Wadhwa was named one of the youngest CEOs in the country. He is the Editor-in-Chief of LetMeAddValue.com., a website founded in 2015 in association with TechAPTO, that has viewers from over 65 countries.

In 2015, Wadhwa founded the social environmental protection site Tyrelessly, and plans to expand it across India.

== Speaking ==
Wadhwa was invited to speak at Josh Meets Jaipur on 19 March 2016 and also gave a TEDx Talk 'Why must the polluter pay?' at TEDxGITAMUniversity in Visakhapatnam on 26 March 2016.

== Recognition ==
Wadhwa and Tyrelessly were included as one of the 6 innovators in the #IndiaInnovates Series, a film series produced by the Marico Innovation Foundation and The Better India. The short documentary film on Wadhwa was developed by the Black Ticket Films based in New Delhi.
