= Involver, Inc. =

Involver, Inc. was a provider of social media management software, offering software-as-a-service (SaaS) tools to help businesses manage their marketing efforts on social media sites such as Facebook and Twitter. It was acquired by Oracle on July 10, 2012.

Founded in San Francisco in 2007 by Rahim Fazal and Noah Horton, the company was originally known as RapOuts, Inc. and changed its name to Involver Inc. in August, 2008. The company offers software and services to publish, manage, moderate and measure customer relations across the social web.

In 2008, Involver powered advertising campaigns on Facebook for several customers and its founders were named to Inc. Magazine's top 30 entrepreneurs under 30 list.

Involver was the technology platform that powered the first sponsorship of a Facebook Page and the first studio album from a recording artist that was released through a social network.

Involver was recommended by Facebook as one of 14 original "Preferred Developer Consultants." Facebook partnered with Involver to build applications for large events like Election Day, The World Cup, and the Super Bowl.

Involver raised venture capital money from Bessemer Venture Partners, Western Technology Investment, and Cervin Ventures.

Involver's main competitors in this space were Buddy Media (acquired by Salesforce.com), Vitrue (also acquired by Oracle Corporation), and Wildfire (acquired by Google).
