= Legitmix =

- Headquarters: Ottawa, Ontario, Canada; Brooklyn, New York
- Key people: Omid McDonald, CEO; Booker Sim, CMO; Gerry Burtenshaw, CTO
- Industry: Music technology
- Products: Music remixes
- Website: www.legitmix.com
- Launched: 2011
- Current status: Defunct

Legitmix was a Canadian company that offered services to artists who create remixes. The company launched in 2011 and had offices in Ottawa, Ontario, Canada and Brooklyn, New York.

Legitmix sold files that rebuild a remixed song on a user's hard drive using the listener's copies of the sampled tracks. Remixers received 70% of the price of their Legitmix files, while copyright holders got paid for the purchase of the original tracks used in the remix. Music files used to construct remixes had to be exact matches to the ones legally sold through Legitmix. Because listeners were required to purchase or already own the original tracks used in a remix, the recreated remix might have been several times more expensive than the cost of an individual song.

The Hood Internet and El-P had used the product. In 2016, it was announced that the company had shut down.
