= Alexa Hirschfeld =

American entrepreneur

Alexa Hirschfeld is an American entrepreneur. Hirschfeld co-founded the online invitation website Paperless Post.

== Work ==
Alexa and James Hirschfeld started Paperless Post while she was a student at Harvard and she was working in New York City in 2008. Paperless Post launched in 2009. She is the President of Paperless Post, and her brother is Chief Executive Officer.
