= Raphael Ouzan =

Israeli technologist and entrepreneur (born 1987)

- רפאל אוזן
- Born: June 9, 1987 (age 39); Reims, France
- Citizenship: Israel
- Occupation: Entrepreneur
- Organization(s): Global Shaper, World Economic Forum
- Board member of: Israel Tech Challenge (chairman); Start Up Nation Central (board member)
- Awards: President's Award for Technology Innovation
- Website: https://www.raphael.io/

Raphael Ouzan (Hebrew: רפאל אוזן; born June 9, 1987) is an Israeli technologist and entrepreneur. The recipient of Israel's President's Award for Technology and Innovation, he is the co-founder of BillGuard and the founder and chairman of Israel Tech Challenge.

== Early life ==
Ouzan was born in Reims, France. His father, James Elisha Ouzan, is a cardiologist and his mother Françoise is a historian. When he was 10, he read about computers in a video gaming magazine and began to study programming on the internet via a dial-up connection he had persuaded his parents to install. After learning the programming languages C and C++, he began to build websites for businesses, becoming a professional coder at 13.

Growing up, Ouzan visited Israel several times with his family. He had limited opportunity to further his programming studies in Reims, and seeking to learn more about technology and entrepreneurship, he moved to Jerusalem in 2003 through Na'ale Elite Academy, an organization for young Jewish people to make Aliyah independently. Through Na'ale, Ouzan attended Boys Town Jerusalem, a high school.

In 2006 Ouzan won the Israel-Intel Young Scientists Prize for a computer-based surveillance system that detects and follows the movement of an intruder in three dimensions. Originally developed as required coursework at Boys Town, it placed first in the 2005 Israel Department of Education national competition for projects related to Comprehensive Interdisciplinary Technology. Ouzan was awarded the prize at the residence of Israel's president as the recipient of the President's Award for Technology and Innovation. The national Intel prize qualified Ouzan to represent Israel at the International Intel Science competition, where he won second prize. In addition to a cash award, a planet was named after him in honor of his win.

Following his high school graduation, Ouzan served in the Israel Defense Forces. An officer in IDF's elite cyber intelligence outfit, the 8200, he established and managed "super hacker" teams and developed scalable and secure intelligence data systems.

=== BillGuard ===
In 2010—the day after his final day as an IDF officer—Ouzan co-founded BillGuard with Yaron Samid. A spending-and-credit-tracking app, it allowed users to track their spending, monitor their credit, set up fraud alerts and, via crowd-sourced data, flag unauthorized charges. Ouzan served as BillGuard's chief technology officer and head of product development.

Five months after its launch the company raised $10m in venture capital from investors including former Google CEO Eric Schmidt and PayPal founder Peter Thiel. Fast Company placed BillGuard on their list of the Top 10 most innovative companies in Israel. The company was acquired by Prosper Marketplace in September 2015. Ouzan was named vice president of products and technology at Prosper Marketplace, a position he held until late 2016.

=== Israel Tech Challenge ===
While in the military, Ouzan became aware of the talent shortage in the tech industry, and co-founded the non-profit Israel Tech Challenge. Backed by the Israeli National Cyber Bureau, the Jewish Agency, private donors and corporate partners such as Check Point, Microsoft, PayPal and Intel, it identifies young professionals internationally and provides them with training in data science, cyber-security and coding to aid or launch their careers in the tech industry. Ouzan serves as the organization's chairman.

== Recognition ==
=== Awards and affiliations ===
- Forbes "30 Under 30" (2016)
- TheMarker "40 Under 40" (2015)
- Selection board, Station F (2017)
- Global Shaper, World Economic Forum
- Board member, StartUp Nation Central
- Schusterman ROI Community
- President's Award for Outstanding Military Achievements (Technical Innovation), 2009
- Intel World Science Competition, 2nd prize, Computer Science, 2006
- Israel Young Scientist, 1st prize, 2006

=== Speaking ===
Ouzan speaks about technology, FinTech, cyber-security and entrepreneurship. In 2012, he spoke on heightened cyber security threats at the World Economic Forum's annual meeting in Davos. Among other talks, he delivered the keynote address at the Wired Money conference in London and lectured about his framework for building hacker teams at the Hello Tomorrow conference in Paris.
