= Headsets.com =

- Website type: Headset Retailer
- Available in: English
- Owner: Mike Faith
- Website: headsets.com
- Current status: Active

Headsets.com is a San Francisco based ecommerce business founded by Mike Faith in 1997. The website specializes in Wireless and corded office headsets, and has been listed among the Inc. 5000 since 2004.

== History ==
Headsets.com was founded by Mike Faith in 1997 after Faith had trouble shopping for headsets for the company he was with at the time. By 2000, the company's revenue was at $3 million, which grew to $11 million in 2003, and $32 million in 2005. During this time the company purchased the domain name Headsets.com and the phone number 1(800) HEADSETS. Today Headsets.com generates over $30 million in sales annually with over 1,000,000 customers.

== Culture and daily operations ==
Headsets.com has a turnover rate of 15% in an industry where the average is over 50%. Faith attributes this to incentives he implemented including a $1,500 annual training stipend, a one-month paid sabbatical after three years of service, and a free trip to Sydney—in which employees are sent to vacation to work with a voice coach. Employees frequently visit other innovative online companies (such as Zappos, StubHub, and others), to inspire new ideas.

The company's strategy uses customer service as their competitive advantage. The company employs voice coaches and psychologist to train their call center representatives. In 2006 Headsets.com won the Stevie Award for "Best Customer Service Team." According to the company, Headsets.com representatives do not use scripts to encourage genuine conversations.

The company was named among San Francisco Business Times' "100 Best Companies to Work for in the Bay Area".

== Marketing ==
Headsets.com has periodically earned media attention through marketing tactics and stunts. In 2009, as a response to a new hands-free cell phone law in California, the company offered a headset giveaway for anyone who was ticketed under the new law. Faith offered a free cellular headset to anyone who sent the company proof of their ticket. That same year, the company offered free headsets for life to anyone who tattooed the company's name on their body.

In 2012, Headsets.com won the right to legally change the last name of entrepreneur Jason Sadler to "Jason HeadsetsDotCom." The investment generated $250,000 in new sales and over $6 million in media coverage.
