= Carlos Cardona =

Colombian internet entrepreneur

- Born: Carlos Alberto Cardona Ospina; 7 March 1974 (age 52); Pereira, Colombia
- Occupation: Entrepreneur

Carlos Cardona (born 7 March 1974) is a Colombian internet entrepreneur best known for his Web 1.0 start-up Yupi Internet. He started his first company at the age of 18. His company went on to raise US$150 million from venture capitalists including Sony, Comcast and News Corp. Yupi was later sold to a joint venture between Microsoft and Telmex after the Dot-com bubble crash.

== Internet entrepreneur ==
- Founder of several start-ups including Yupi Internet (Yupi.com) (later sold to Microsoft / Telmex) Now Latino.msn.com
- Co-founder of Welltok Inc to be acquired by Virgin Pulse

== Professional recognition ==
- Carlos Cardona, influential Hispanic for 2000 - HispanicBusiness.com
- Received both 1999 and 2000 Hispanic Entrepreneur Award “100 Most Influential Hispanics” by Hispanic Magazine, sponsored by IBM.
- Need an Internet Expert for Y2K? Carlos Cardona, Founder and CTO of Yupi.com Prnewswire.com
- Newsweek: Critical Mas: 20 For 2000
- Newsweek: Latin U.S.A.: How Young Hispanics Are Changing America
- Carlos Slim (Telmex) and Bill Gates (Microsoft) buy Yupi.com *Spanish
- Microsoft Press: Microsoft and Telmex Joint Venture, T1msn, to Acquire Yupi Internet
- Microsoft Press: Getting in the Head of 26,000 YupiMSN Users
- Microsoft Press: YupiMSN Introduces MSN Explorer in Spanish
- New York Times: Business; "What they are reading"
