= Yupi =

Former Web portal

Yupi was a Spanish-language Internet portal founded in 1997 by Carlos Cardona and Camilo Cruz in Miami Beach, Florida.

== Company history ==
Yupi Internet Inc. was founded in May 1996. Its flagship portal site, Yupi.com, was a Spanish-language content and services site. In 1999, Yupi acquired CiudadFutura, one of the world's first Spanish-language online communities, which at the time was supported by over 200 webmasters from around the world. The Yupi portfolio featured MujerFutura.com, a site catering to Spanish-speaking women. Yupi also owned sites dedicated to localized news, content and services; including multimedia site YupiTV. Yupi.com and its network of sites was headquartered in Miami Beach, Fla. and had offices in Bogotá (Colombia), Madrid and Barcelona (Spain), Mexico City (Mexico), Buenos Aires (Argentina) and in Quito (Ecuador).

The company's Senior Executive staff included: Oscar Coën (President and CEO), Marlena Delgado (COO), Rudy Vila (SVP Business Development - Entertainment), Jose Luque (Sr. VP Business Development and eCommerce), Pepe Carreras (SVP Client Management), and Gustavo Morles (Sr. VP Business Development and Content), Camilo Cruz (First CEO and Co-Founder), Carlos A Cardona (CTO and Founder).

By 1999 the company had raised as much as $150 million from venture capitalists including Sony, Comcast and News Corp. It was planning an initial public offering in the spring of 2000 when the Nasdaq market crashed. Quickly running out of cash and without enough revenue to support its business, Yupi cut staff by 66% on December 19, 2000.

In 2001, Yupi was acquired in a joint venture between Microsoft and Telmex (Teléfonos de México). Although MSN and Telmex never disclosed the price they paid in acquiring Yupi, analysts had estimated that it might have been about $50 million, much less than investors had poured in.

In 2003, YupiMSN's operations were moved to the Microsoft campus in Redmond, Washington.
