= Adrian Scott (entrepreneur) =

- Born: Ottawa, Ontario, Canada
- Education: Rensselaer Polytechnic Institute
- Occupations: Entrepreneur, technologist, investor, actor
- Known for: Founder of Ryze; Founding Investor of Napster
- Website: www.adrianscott.com

Adrian Scott is a social networking site founder, technology entrepreneur, investor, and film and TV actor. He is best known as founder of the social networking site Ryze in the summer of 2001, and as a founding investor in Napster.

== Education ==
Scott graduated from Rensselaer Polytechnic Institute at age 16 with a B.S. cum laude in Mathematics, and received his Ph.D. in Mathematics at age 20. He then taught management at Hong Kong Polytechnic University as a visiting scholar for a semester. He was awarded the U.S. Air Force Auxiliary Civil Air Patrol's General Carl A. Spaatz Award.

== Napster ==
Scott was an early angel investor in Napster, a peer‑to‑peer music service.

== Ryze ==
Scott started building Ryze in early 2001. Ryze was a major influence on Friendster (which in turn influenced Facebook) and other social networking startups. Ryze received a Webby Awards nomination in the 6th Annual Webby Awards in the Services Category.

== Angel investor ==
Scott invested in high-tech startups including Napster, BuyDirect.com (acquired by Beyond.com), and Giganet (acquired by Emulex).

== Startup advisor ==
Scott has advised high-tech startups including Starmine (acquired by Thomson Reuters) and Plaxo (acquired by Comcast).

== Board member ==
Scott is on the board of directors of Legitmix.

== Patent ==
Adrian Scott is an inventor of a U.S. Patent titled "Hashing algorithm used for multiple files having identical content and fingerprint in a peer-to-network". Read More

== Actor ==
Scott is also a film and television actor, having appeared in the feature films Hands of Stone, Historias del Canal, and The Wind and the Water, and the television show QuienTV.

== Press coverage ==
Scott has been written about in books including The Facebook Effect: The Inside Story of the Company That Is Connecting the World, All the Rave: The Rise and Fall of Shawn Fanning's Napster, The Customer Revolution, and Growing Up Digital, as well as in numerous magazine and newspaper articles internationally.
