= BillGuard =

- Company type: Private
- Industry: Computer software, Internet, Personal finance
- Founded: 2010
- Founder: Yaron Samid (CEO), Raphael Ouzan (CTO)
- Headquarters: New York City, United States
- Products: Rich web application, Mobile application
- Website: www.billguard.com

BillGuard was a personal finance security and productivity company. Its mobile and web applications scanned credit and debit card transactions, alerting users to potential scams, billing errors, fraudulent charges, and hidden fees.

As of October 2014, BillGuard reported flagging over $60 million in suspect charges on behalf of its users, based on more than $1 billion in monitored transactions.

In September 2015, BillGuard was acquired by Prosper Marketplace and subsequently renamed Prosper Daily.

On August 31, 2017, Prosper discontinued the Prosper Daily service, recommending the Clarity Money app as an alternative, stating that it "offers many of the same features as Prosper Daily."

BillGuard was recognized as "one of the top online banking innovations of all time" by MarketConsensus and named a "Top 10 Tech Company" by American Banker.

BillGuard was also ranked as the "Top 2015 Most Powerful Financial Protection App" by AdvisoryHQ News.

== Products ==
In July 2013, BillGuard launched a free iPhone app, encouraging users to take a more active role in monitoring their charges compared to the company's earlier "set-and-forget" web application. In May 2014, BillGuard introduced a free Android app.

BillGuard provided personalized data breach alerts, notifying users if they had shopped at a merchant that had experienced a breach.

BillGuard utilized a combination of crowdsourced user feedback, data from the Consumer Financial Protection Bureau, complaints posted online, and proprietary algorithms to identify charges to highlight for users through email and smartphone push alerts.

BillGuard Resolve directly connected merchants with customers seeking to inquire about charges on their cards. BillGuard FI, designed for financial institutions, aimed to reduce transaction inquiry and dispute processing costs.

== History ==
The company was founded in 2010 by Yaron Samid (CEO) and Raphael Ouzan (CTO), with $3 million in seed funding from Bessemer Venture Partners, Founder Collective, SV Angel, IA Ventures, Social Leverage, and Yaron Galai.

BillGuard launched at TechCrunch Disrupt New York in May 2011, where it won second place. In 2011, the company raised a $10 million financing round from its seed funders, along with Vinod Khosla’s Khosla Ventures, Peter Thiel’s Founders Fund, and Eric Schmidt’s Innovation Endeavors. BillGuard was awarded "2011 Big-Data Startup of the Year" at the O'Reilly Media Strata Conference and won ‘Best of Show’ at the Finovate conference in both 2011 and 2012.

The Jerusalem Post writer Joseph Sherman notes:

"Business Schools around the world study how the Rothschild family transformed the world of international banking. In a practical spin on the story, today, on Rothschild Boulevard in Tel Aviv, Raphael Ouzan is living his dream in Israel as the co-founder and Chief Technology Officer of a start-up that is changing how consumers monitor their credit and debit card spending, and helping us get our money back from unwanted and deceptive charges."

=== Grey Charges Report ===
In July 2013, BillGuard and the Aite Group released a comprehensive "Grey Charges" report, which found that in 2012, U.S. cardholders received over $14.3 billion in deceptive and unwanted credit and debit card charges. According to the report, one in three American cardholders receives at least one grey charge each year, averaging $215 per person annually.
