= Elicitus =

- Developer(s): Harbinger Knowledge Products
- Stable release: 8.3 / November 2012; 12 years ago
- Operating system: Microsoft Windows
- Type: eLearning, Educational technology
- License: Commercial
- Website: www.elicitus.com

Elicitus software is a desktop authoring tool. An authoring tool is used by trainers, educators and subject matter experts for creating elearning courses. Elicitus has been designed and developed by Harbinger Knowledge Products and was first launched in 2005. Elicitus is a SCORM/AICC and Section 508 guidelines compliant tool. It contains about 200 standard layout templates which can be customized by the user. Elicitus allows videos (AVI, MPG, SWF) to be added to the courses. For assessment, the trainers can create and administer quizzes using multiple types of questions like multiple choice, True/False, match the pairs etc. Trainers can also import their Powerpoint presentations into Elicitus and convert the slides into a course.

Besides English, Elicitus is available in Arabic and Chinese versions. Elicitus has won the Best Authoring Tool award at LearnX Australia, in 2008 & 2009.

Sale of Elictus has been terminated by the end of 2017 according to elictus.com.
