= Rahim Fazal =

Canadian-born technology entrepreneur, co-founder of Involver, Inc.

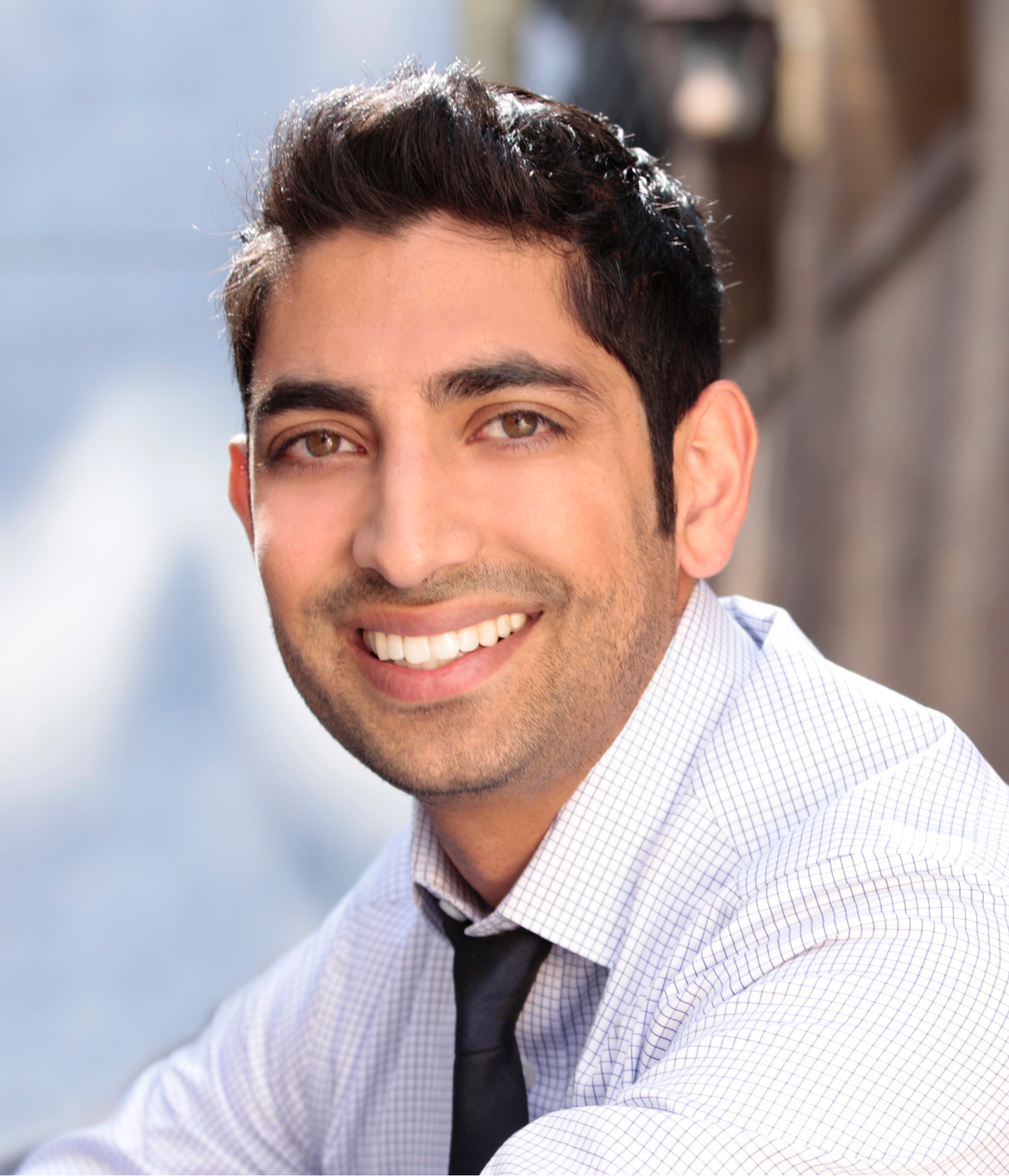
- Fazal in 2015

Rahim Fazal is a Canadian-born technology entrepreneur. He is notable for co-founding Involver, Inc., a provider of social media management software. Involver was co-founded by Fazal and Noah Horton in San Francisco in 2007 and was acquired by Oracle on July 10, 2012.

Involver was the technology platform that powered the first sponsorship of a Facebook Page. Facebook partnered with Involver to build applications for large events like Election Day, the FIFA World Cup, and the Super Bowl.

Fazal and co-founder Horton were named to Inc. Magazine's Top 30 Entrepreneurs Under 30 list in 2008. He received an Empact Award from Startup America and the Kauffman Foundation at the White House in 2011. He was named one of the Top 40 Under 40 by the San Francisco Business Times in 2013 and one of the Top 25 Digital Thought Leaders by iMedia.

Fazal is the holder of an MBA from the Ivey Business School. He was the youngest person to be accepted to the program without a pre-requisite undergraduate degree.
