= Ryze =

Social networking website

- Website type: Social networking service
- Founder: Adrian Scott
- Website: www.ryze.com

Ryze was a social networking service established in 2001 by Adrian Scott. The platform catered to business professionals, offering networking and professional connections.

Ryze contributed to the development of subsequent social networking services such as Friendster, founded by Jonathan Abrams in 2003.
