= Matt Watson (entrepreneur) =

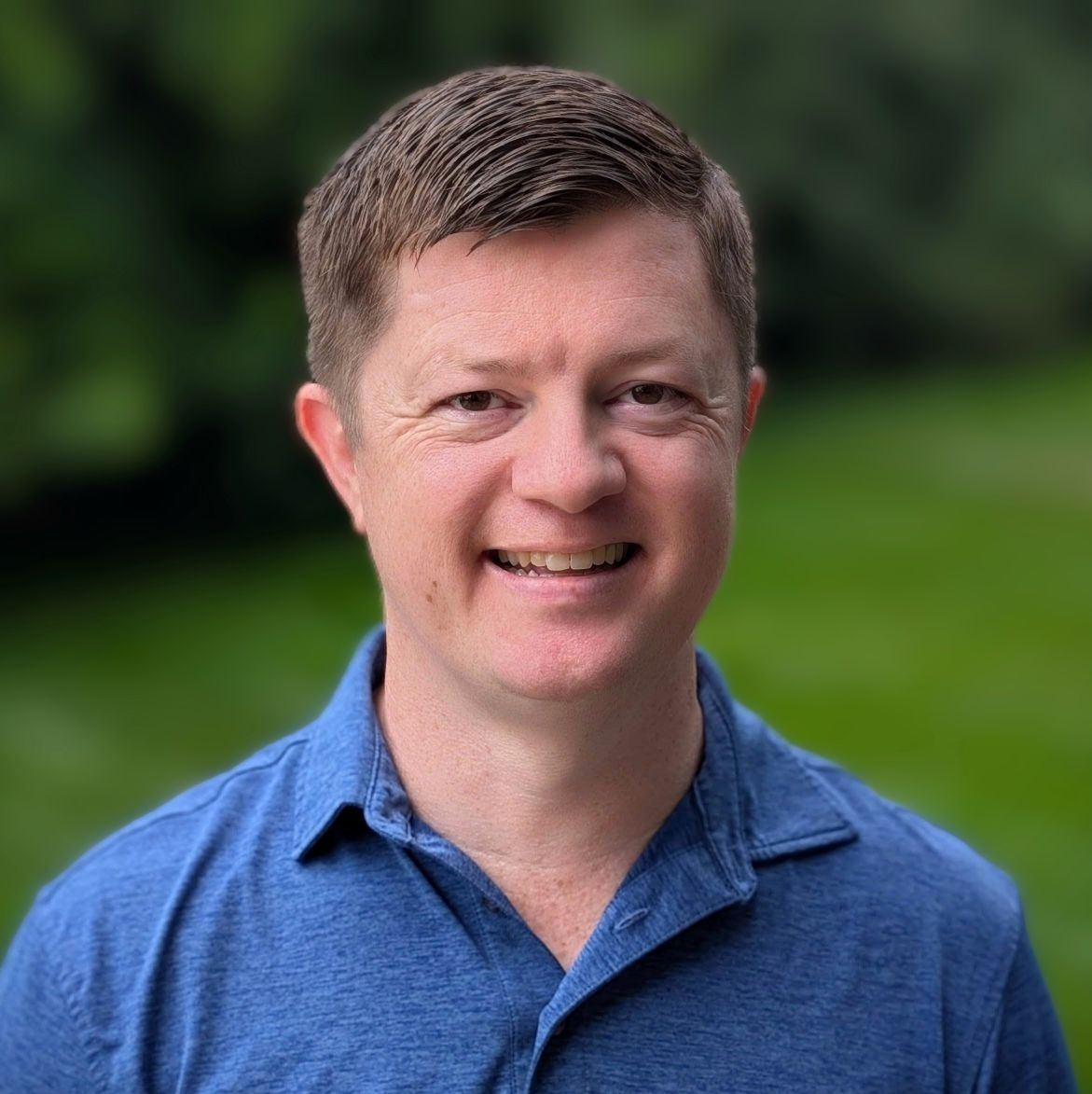
- Born: Matthew Allan Watson; July 7, 1981 (age 44); Oklahoma City, Oklahoma
- Education: Bachelor of Science
- Alma mater: DeVry University
- Occupation: Software development
- Years active: 2000 - present
- Known for: Founder and CEO of Stackify, CTO of VinSolutions

Matthew Allan Watson (born July 7, 1981, in Oklahoma City) also known as Matt Watson, is an American entrepreneur and the current CEO of Stackify LLC, a technology company based in Leawood, Kansas. In 2003, Watson co-founded and served as CTO of VinSolutions, a developer of online CRM and lead management software for auto dealerships. In 2011, VinSolutions was sold for $135 million to AutoTrader.com. Then Watson founded Stackify in January 2012 to assist software developers in troubleshooting and support with a suite of tools including Prefix and Retrace. Watson has credited his experience at VinSolutions for the skills necessary to build Stackify. During the same period, he also launched the Watson Technology Group to support other entrepreneurs via angel investing. Watson received a Bachelor of Science degree in computer information systems at DeVry University in 2009.
