= Piggybackr =

American crowdfunding website

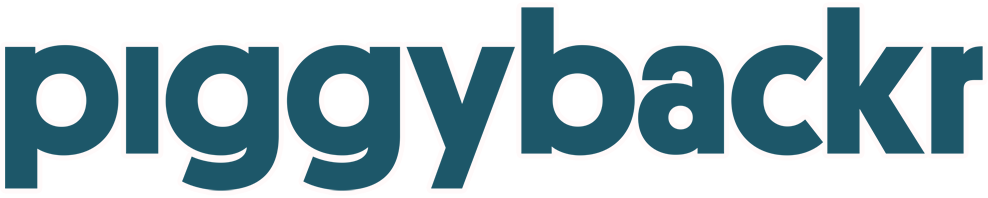
- Company type: Crowdfunding
- Founded: 2012
- Headquarters: New York metropolitan area
- Website: piggybackr.com

Piggybackr is an American crowdfunding website for students and youth teams to fundraise for their schools, projects, and causes online. It is compliant with the Children's Online Privacy Protection Act, meaning that children under the age of 13 must have parental involvement with their projects. Children as young as 5 can run fundraising projects online. Backers of projects can post public comments, but cannot communicate directly with the children posting projects.

== Description ==
Piggybackr has been described as “Kickstarter for students.” Unlike Kickstarter, children offer "thank you gifts" including advertising for companies, such as committing to running a lap, putting a business' logo on their page, or giving someone a shout-out on Facebook.

== History ==
Piggybackr was founded in 2012 by Andrea Lo and Keenahn Jung. It was launched out of the AngelPad accelerator. Andrea Lo's 12-year-old sister had just begun to fundraise the year before, in the same way that Lo did 10 years earlier as a child. Lo spent about a year developing a way to fundraise for children that used Facebook. After another year of private beta, Piggybackr launched nationwide on April 17, 2013 with over 1,500 projects and $250,000 raised by kids. The website's customers include national and regional chapters of youth organizations like FIRST Robotics and YMCA.

== Sample projects ==
- Norcal Crew youth rowing team raised $45,000 to buy a new eight-man racing boat
- University of California at Berkeley Alternative Breaks raised $14,565 to support college students doing volunteer work during spring break

== Endorsements ==
A number of youth organizations have suggested fundraising on Piggybackr. These include:

- Timothy C. Draper's Bizworld Foundation
- For Inspiration and Recognition of Science and Technology
- United States Power Soccer Association
- California YMCA Youth and Government

== See also ==
- Fundly
- Causes
- HopeMob.org
