= Paperless Post =

American software company

- Website type: Private
- Founded: 2008
- Headquarters: New York City, New York, {{{location_country}}}
- Founders: Alexa Hirschfeld; James Hirschfeld
- Website: www.paperlesspost.com

Paperless Post is a software company based in New York City that enables creating, sending, and managing online invitations and events.

== Product ==
Paperless Post invitations and cards are designed both in-house and by exclusive design partners such as Oscar de La Renta, Carolina Herrera, Rifle Paper Co., Kate Spade New York, John Derian, and more.

Event hosts can customize digital invitations with their own text, logo, or photo, style their event page with fonts and custom modules (called Blocks), and choose to have them delivered via email, text, or link. They can track RSVPs, send private messages, and follow up with guests.

Paperless Post does not have ads. As one of its founders said, having ads would be like “getting a flyer inside a wedding invitation”.

== History ==
Paperless Post was founded by sibling entrepreneurs James and Alexa Hirschfeld in 2008 when they were 23 and 25 years old respectively. Since then, it has been used by 200 million people.

In 2018 it launched a product called Flyer, designed to be a more lightweight, mobile-first invitation. James Hirschfeld said that the goal was to give people the tools to express something they felt reflects them, across a wide range of vibes and styles.

== Usage ==
While Paperless Post began as an event platform for personal events, like birthday parties and weddings, it is also used today for professional and business event invitations.

== In popular culture ==
Paperless Post has been mentioned in TV shows including “And Just Like That,” “The Other Black Girl,” “Good Girls,” “I’m Sorry,” “Happy Endings,” “Saturday Night Live,” and more.

One of the Coronation FAQ questions when Charles III, King of the United Kingdom, assumed the throne in April 2023 was, “Is there a physical invitation, or is this a Paperless Post situation?”
