= Paul Chen (businessman) =

Canadian businessman

- Education: University of Toronto
- Occupation: entrepreneur
- Known for: founder of FloNetwork and Fortiva

Paul Chen is a Canadian entrepreneur based in Toronto, founder of two technology companies, FloNetwork and Fortiva.

Chen has a Bachelor of Applied Science in Electrical Engineering from the University of Toronto. In his early career, he held senior development positions with IBM, Honeywell and Bell-Northern Research. He founded FloNetwork in 1993, and was chief executive officer and chief technology officer. After raising over $30M from high-profile venture capital firms such as McLean Watson Capital, Ventures West and the Ontario Teachers' Pension Plan, Chen was instrumental in selling the business in 2001 to DoubleClick (now owned by Google) for $80M. Following his exit from FloNetwork, Chen was an Entrepreneur in Residence at McLean Watson Capital. He launched the email archiving service Fortiva in 2005. As CEO, Chen helped to establish The Electronic Communications Compliance Council (TE3C). Fortiva grew in the "Software as a service" email archiving space before being acquired in 2008 by Proofpoint.
