= Orion Hindawi =

American billionaire software entrepreneur

- Born: 1980 (age 45–46)
- Education: University of California, Berkeley
- Occupation: software entrepreneur
- Known for: co-founder of Tanium, Inc.
- Children: 2
- Parent: David Hindawi

Orion Hindawi (born 1980) is an American billionaire software entrepreneur, and co-founder of cybersecurity firm Tanium.

== Biography ==
Hindawi was born and raised in Berkeley, California, and attended the University of California, Berkeley. He is the son of billionaire David Hindawi, an Iraqi Jewish immigrant from Israel.

In 2007, along with his father, he founded the cybersecurity firm, Tanium. In September 2015, they raised $120 million in new funding that valued Tanium at $10 billion. Tanium uses a novel approach to cybersecurity different from its main competitors Symantec and Intel's McAfee which have a central data center that communicates directly with individual computers (and requiring a massive investment in data centers), Tanium instead uses a linear chain system where each computer on a network talks to the computer adjacent to it, pooling data, and then relaying the information in a chain before sending it back to a single server.

In February 2016, Orion took over as CEO from his father. In 2023, Orion stepped down as CEO and appointed Dan Streetman as a replacement.

In August 2026, Orion returned to his CEO role at Tanium, replacing Dan Streetman after less than four years.

== Personal life ==
Hindawi is married and has two children.
