= Fucked Company =

Website created by Philip J. "Pud" Kaplan

Fucked Company was a website created by Philip J. "Pud" Kaplan after the dot-com bubble in 2000 as a "dot-com dead pool" that chronicled troubled and failing companies in a unique and abrasive manner. The website also sold rumor listings to subscribers. The site's name is a parody of Fast Company, a magazine that began covering technology companies during the Internet dot-com boom.

A September 10, 2000 attempt by Kaplan to put the entire site up for sale on eBay attracted joke bids as high as $10 million but no serious buyers.

== History ==
Fucked Company (commonly abbreviated FC) allowed employees to post anonymous comments on why their employer was losing money, had abused employees, or was discriminating against some group, identifying unethical managers and defective products or services by name. Employees were free to explain why they thought the companies were going out of business. This made the site a target for strategic lawsuits against public participation from companies. The site was taken offline for two days in August 2002; Ford Motor Company law firm Howard Phillips & Andersen had threatened litigation against FC's upstream provider HostGator as a means of silencing a discussion of a series of layoffs entitled "Ford, where finding a job is job one." Ford claimed that it infringed a trademark slogan "Ford, where quality is job one," discontinued after widespread use from 1980 to 1997. The site eventually returned minus the news of the Ford layoffs.

Even where the cases were spurious or were settled out of court for a small fee, it drained the resources of FC to fight these lawsuits. As a consumer complaint site, FC also faced increasing competition from new entrants, including social networking providers. Michael Arrington announced on March 31, 2007 that TechCrunch had acquired FuckedCompany.com in an April Fools' Day joke press release.

Starting in August 2007, the site ceased posting new content, and later converted its main page to the simple message:

Fuckedcompany is... fucked.
R.I.P. 2000-2007. If you're just now seeing this website for the first time, ask someone who was in the internet business during "round 1" to tell you all about it.
