= Andrea Lo =

American Internet entrepreneur (born 1986)

- Born: 1986 (age 39–40)
- Education: University of California at Berkeley, University of Oxford
- Occupation: Founder of Main Character Capital
- Known for: Co-founding Piggybackr

Andrea Lo (born 1986) is an American Internet entrepreneur best known for co-founding the children's fundraising website Piggybackr. In 2012, Andrea was named one of “6 Women Entrepreneurs to Watch” by Forbes for founding Piggybackr as a crowdfunding site to help “teens raise money for a cause...”

== Early life ==
Andrea grew up in Millbrae, California, where she attended Franklin Elementary School and Burlingame Intermediate School. She attended UC Berkeley and has worked as a consultant. She is also a graduate of AngelPad and The Founder Institute.

== Piggybackr ==
In 2012, Andrea founded the crowdfunding site Piggybackr. The site is devoted to helping young students raise money for causes and school projects. Andrea was inspired to start Piggybackr when she helped her younger sister at age 11, raise $370 for rainforest preservation by selling bracelets on-line. Lo said “If you can inspire and teach a young kid at age 11 to raise money or to realize they can make an impact, I just think that there are so many greater implications.” The site is also noted for the speed at which projects can be set up. Validation takes place in 48 hours and web sites can be set up in 5 minutes.

Andrea has been honored by Forbes, appeared on "Good Morning Vail" and recognized internationally for her efforts with Piggybackr.
