= David Hindawi =

Iraqi-born, American billionaire software entrepreneur

- ديفيد هنداوي
- Born: 1944 (age 80–81)
- Education: University of California, Berkeley
- Occupation(s): investor, philanthropist
- Known for: co-founder of Tanium, Inc.
- Spouse: married
- Children: 2
- Family: Orion Hindawi

David Hindawi (Arabic: ديفيد هنداوي; born 1944) is an Iraqi-born, American billionaire software entrepreneur, and co-founder of cybersecurity firm Tanium.

== Biography ==
Hindawi was born on December 8, 1944, to an Iraqi-Jewish family in Baghdad and moved to Israel in 1951. After college he served in the Israeli Air Force's Operations Research department.

In 1970, he immigrated to the United States where he earned a PhD from the University of California, Berkeley.

In 1984, he founded a telecommunications company, Software Ventures, which was sold to an Internet service provider in 1995. In 1997, he founded BigFix Inc, an IT systems management company that was acquired by IBM for $400 million in 2010.

In 2007, along with his son, Orion Hindawi, he founded the cybersecurity firm, Tanium Inc. In September 2015, they raised $120 million in new funding that valued Tanium at $10 billion. Tanium uses an approach to cybersecurity different from its main competitors Symantec and Intel's McAfee which have a central data center that communicates directly with individual computers (and requiring a massive investment in data centers), Tanium instead uses a peer-to-peer system where each computer on a network talks to the computer adjacent to it, pooling data, and then relaying the information in a chain before sending it back to a single server.

In February 2016, Orion took over as CEO from his father, who continued to serve as the company's executive chairman.

== Personal life ==
Hindawi is married to Hanna Hindawi and has two children.
