= James Hirschfeld (chief executive) =

American businessman

James Hirschfeld is an entrepreneur. Hirschfeld co-founded the online invitation website Paperless Post.

== Work ==
Hirschfeld, started Paperless Post while he was a student at Harvard and his sister Alexa Hirschfeld was working in New York City in 2008. Paperless Post launched in 2009. Today, he serves as the chief executive officer of the concern.
