= FloNetwork =

- Formerly: Media Synergy Inc.
- Industry: marketing
- Founded: 1993
- Founder: Paul Chen; Mina Lux
- Headquarters: Canada

FloNetwork was an eMarketing Application Service Provider (ASP) that specialized in permission- based Internet direct marketing and communications services. The company, which was privately held until its acquisition by Doubleclick (now owned by Google), operated as an ASP and enabled clients to send mass email campaigns. Flonetwork was an early leader in the permission-based online direct marketing and communications market.

== History ==
Toronto-based FloNetwork was cofounded in 1993 by entrepreneurs Paul Chen and Mina Lux, under the name Media Synergy Inc. In November 1999 the company changed its name to FloNetwork Inc. Its initial business involved the development, sale and licensing of multimedia consumer software products. In 1998, they began developing and selling e-mail messaging software applications and services. In January 1999, they discontinued the development, sale and licensing of multimedia consumer software products and adopted a business strategy to offer e-mail messaging services over a hosted technology platform, quickly becoming a leader in the field.

== Products ==
FloNetwork offered a suite of hosted applications and services to handle all aspects of permission-based email messaging campaigns, including designing email messages, building and managing email address lists, testing and deploying email messaging campaigns and real-time tracking, reporting and analysis of results. As an early provider, the company quickly became recognized as a leader in the field, including articles in the NY Times, Business 2.0, and The Wall Street Journal.

== Early customers ==
FloNetwork quickly became a leader and established a strong customer base early on, including well-known companies including barnesandnoble.com, buy.com, CNET, Careerpath, CMP, Experian, Hallmark, Ingram Micro, Internet World, J. Crew, Meredith Corporation, Omaha Steaks and Virgin Records.

== Awards ==
FloNetwork was recognized by Deloitte & Touche in 2000 as a winner of the Canadian Technology Fast 50 award, becoming the first email marketing ASP worldwide to receive this award. It was also recognized in the top half of the Fast500 for technology companies in North America.

== Acquisition by Doubleclick ==
In 2001, Doubleclick (now owned by Google) acquired Flonetwork for $80M.
