= Interest graph =

Online representation of a person's views and desires to learn

Suppose two people have similar interests, such as photo and they like the same music. So there is a relationship between them based on their interests which can be shown by interest graph. Vertices correspond to entities, and edges are the relationships between entities.

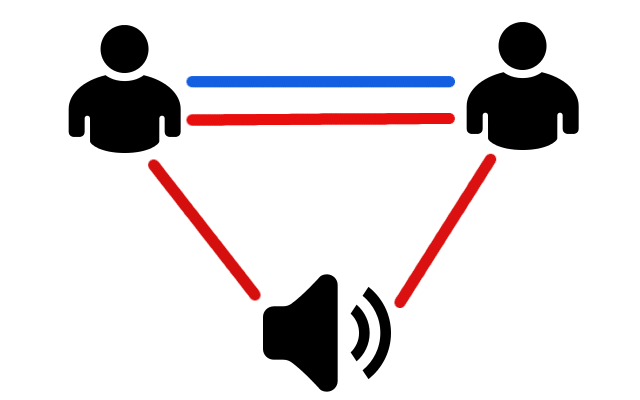
Red edges are the part of an interest graph, where relations (red edges) could be between (1) user and interest and (2) between users. Blue edges are the part of a social graph, where there are relations only between users.

An interest graph is a digital portrayal of an individual's specific interests. Its perceived utility and value stem from the premise that a person's interests form a significant component of their personal identity. They can be used as indicators of various aspects, such as a person's preferences regarding activities, purchases, destinations, as well as who they may choose to meet, follow, or support politically.

== Relationship of interest graph to social graph ==
Interest graphs and social graphs are closely related, but they are not synonymous. Where Facebook and other social networks are organized around an individual's friends or social graph, interest networks are organized around an individual's interests, which are represented as an interest graph.

Both graphs extend across the web, with social graphs serving as maps of a person's social media connections, and interest graphs as mappings of an individual's interests. In this way an individual's interests represented in an interest graph provide a means of further personalizing the web based on intersecting the interest graphs with web content.

Interest graphs or interest networks can in some cases be derived from social graphs or social networks and may maintain their context within that social network. These are specifically social interest graphs or interest-based social graphs.

For an interest graph to be accurate and expressive, it must consider explicitly declared interests, for example "Likes" on Facebook or “Interests” in a LinkedIn profile, as well as implicit interest inferred from user activities such as clicks, comments, tagged photos and check-ins. Social networks are often a source for this data.

== Uses of interest graph ==
There are several personal and commercial uses for interest graphs. They can be applied in conjunction with social graphs as a way to meet or connect with people in a social network or community with shared or common interests, and who may not otherwise know each other.

Interest graphs can also be applied to marketing for purposes such as audience analytics and audience-based buying, for sentiment analysis, and for advertising as another form of behavioral profiling and targeting based on interests. Companies like Twitter, for example, use interest graphs to specifically target advertisements to their users based on their interests. Interest graphs may be applied to product development by using customer interests to help determine which new features or capabilities to provide in future versions of a product.

Interest graphs have many other uses as well, including simulation, research and other content discovery and filtering tasks, as input to recommendation engines for films, books, music, etc., and for learning and education.

== See also ==
- Community of interest
- Social web
- Social graph
