= Vikas Joshi =

Indian businessman

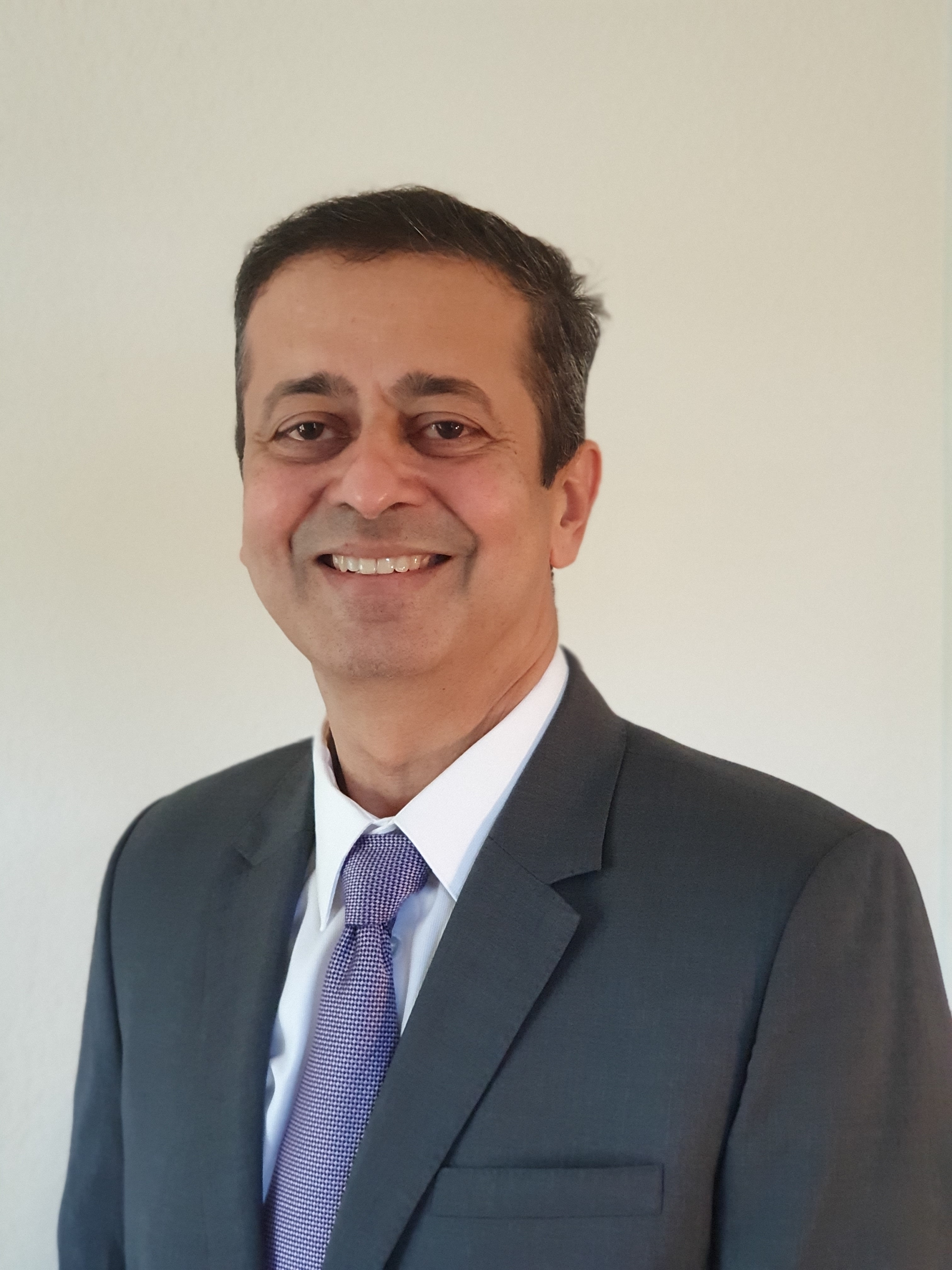
- Born: 1 October 1963 (age 62); India

Vikas Joshi is an Indian businessman, who founded the technology company Harbinger Group in 1990.

== Education ==
Joshi holds a doctorate from the University of Pennsylvania and is an alumnus of the Harvard Business School and IIT, Bombay. His doctoral research in entrepreneurship investigates the co-evolution of technology firms and founders. American Educational Research Association has awarded the top spot for this scholarly work on how entrepreneurs learn and develop.

== Awards and recognition ==
- 2008: Recognized as e-learning thought leader by TrainingIndustry.com
- 2009: Featured in the TV program "Swades" on Zee Business, which features entrepreneurs who returned to India and set up successful enterprises
- 2012: Conferred with the Distinguished Service Award by IIT Bombay
- 2013: Recognized in top ten World e-learning movers and shakers in 2013
- 2017: American Educational Research Association recognized his research in entrepreneurship with 'Dissertation of the Year 2017' award
