= Philip Kaplan =

American entrepreneur (born 1975)

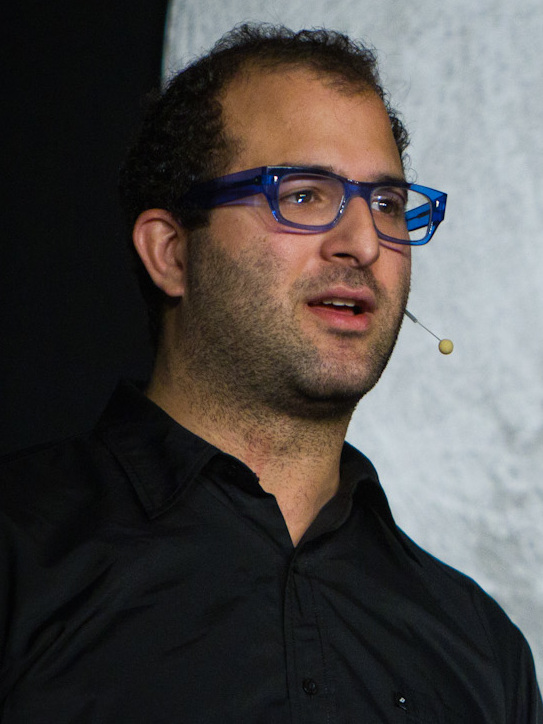
- Kaplan in 2011
- Born: October 30, 1975 (age 50)
- Other names: Pud Kaplan
- Occupations: entrepreneur, computer programmer
- Website: https://www.pud.com

Philip J. "Pud" Kaplan (born October 30, 1975) is an American entrepreneur and computer programmer who has founded several Internet companies.

He created the Fucked Company website in May 2000 and wrote the corresponding book F'd Companies (ISBN 0743228626) in 2002.

He has subsequently created other websites and web-based ventures, including the online advertising market site AdBrite, which he founded in 2004. In June 2009, Kaplan joined Charles River Ventures as an Entrepreneur In Residence.

In July 2011, Kaplan formed ADHD Labs, an incubator for web and iPhone apps. ADHD Labs' company, TinyLetter, was acquired by MailChimp in August 2011. Kaplan later founded Fandalism, a social networking website for musicians in January 2012, which was renamed to DistroKid over a year later in mid 2013 when the service expanded to offer the digital distribution of music.

Kaplan obtained his Bachelor of Science in 1997 from the Syracuse University School of Information Studies and delivered the convocation address at the Class of 2014 graduation ceremony.

In 2024, Kaplan gained recognition for building novelty headphones, including pairs with large Helmholtz resonators, dumbbells, and wine corks. His posts went viral on Reddit, and he showcased the headphones at conventions.

Kaplan is also a drummer, performing in the band Butchers of the Final Frontier.

He currently resides in San Francisco, California.
