= Jelley =

Jelley is a surname. Notable people with the surname include:

- Albert Jelley (1894–1966), New Zealand cricket umpire
- Arch Jelley (1922–2026), New Zealand athletics coach
- Daisy Jelley (born 2000), English model and actress
- David Jelley MLC. (1871–1907), South Australian trades unionist
- Derek Jelley (born 1972), former professional rugby union player
- J.V. Jelley (1856–1950), English artist, president of the Royal Birmingham Society of Artists
- James Jelley (1873–1954), Australian politician and trade unionist
- Sophie Jelley (born 1972), British Anglican priest
- Stephen Jelley (born 1982), British auto racing driver
- Tom Jelley (1926–2014), American football defensive end

== See also ==
- Jell (disambiguation)
- Jelle
- Jelly (disambiguation)
