= Geld =

Geld may refer to:

== Castration ==
- Gelding, equine castration

== Gold or money ==
- Danegeld, a tax paid to Viking raiders
- Hanukkah gelt (Yiddish spelling)

== Surname ==
- Geld (surname)

== See also ==
- Gel (disambiguation)
- Gelt (disambiguation)
