= Jel =

Jel or JEL may refer to:

- Jel (rapper) (born 1978), an American record producer and rapper
- Jel (singer), a Japanese singer
- Journal of Economic Literature, a journal published by the American Economic Association
- Jewish English Lexicon, an online dictionary of Jewish English
- Jaungoikoa eta Lagizarra (God & the Old Law), motto of the Basque Nationalist Party

== See also ==
- Gel (disambiguation)
- Jell (disambiguation)
- Jil (disambiguation)
- Jem (disambiguation)
- Jul (disambiguation)
