= Gelt (disambiguation) =

Gelt may refer to:

- Gelt, also known as Hanukkah gelt, chocolate coins given to Jewish children on Hanukkah
- River Gelt, a river of Cumbria, England
- Gelt River (New Zealand), a river of Canterbury, New Zealand
- Gelt Lake, a lake of Lombardy, Italy

== People with the surname ==
- Felix Gelt (born 1978), Canadian soccer player

== See also ==
- Geld (surname)
