= World of Knowledge =

Educational project developed by WOKcraft

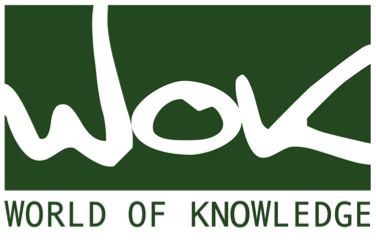
- Company type: Education
- Founded: 2009; 17 years ago
- Founder: Erik Bolinder
- Website: www.wokcraft.com

World of Knowledge is a global Wikipedia inspired commercial project to enhance learning developed by company WOKcraft based on a community of users creating multiple choice questions for free public use. The abbreviation for the project is WOK and used to market quiz game mobile apps in a social network called the Knowledge Network.

In all WOK apps the connection to Wikipedia is used by in coexistence with the multiple choice questions and Wikipedia content of articles and images using Wikipedia live content.

WOK develops mobile apps in an ecosystem that are connected with the same scoresystem and with Wikipedia articles using the open API from Wikimedia Commons.

== History ==
The WOK project was started by the founder Erik Bolinder in 2009. During several years he planned to create a system for social network based on learning and knowledge. After extensive travel around the World a team was found in Cairo for developing the first WOK related product called Wokcraft.com, WOKquiz and WOKbattle in 2012–2013. All initial projects were cancelled and redeveloped in 2014 when the app Quiz King was launched.

In 2015 the app WOKwiki was developed and launched on the 15th Anniversary of Wikipedia. In 2017 the app was renamed to WikiMaster. In late 2016 the app WikiFlip was launched as the third app in the WOK ecosystem of quiz apps. All apps have been developed for Android and iOS mobile smartphones.

All apps in WOK are based on the database of multiple choice questions with four alternatives, one being factually correct and three alternatives being incorrect. No direct relation to Wikipedia articles on questions exists other than keywords that are the same as Wikipedia articles.

In the WikiMaster app a full Wikipedia access is to be found in 11 languages. Quizzes exist in 4 languages, English being the largest with 300000 questions indexed.

WOKcraft has also developed an API that could be used in Wikipedia making all WOK questions available in Wikipedia without the need for access to apps from WOKcraft.

Critics among the Wikipedia community project point to the commercial interests the WOK project based on which is not in line with the Wikipedia Foundation principles being a nonprofit organization.

Enhancers to the WOK project point to the fact that learning is in coexistence with control questions in text books at the end of chapters and this would be useful to Wikipedia users if accessed and that WOK has been free to use without any advertising or subscription model just as Wikipedia. WOK has developed an API for the Wikipedia community to implement free public access to the questions in WOK so Wikipedia users could use questions in Wikipedia articles.

The crowd sourced system of content used by Wikipedia articles is similar in WOK. All questions in WOK can be traced to a log file of creators, date and content. Wokers correct questions that are incorrect in spelling or content and are not fact based with a reliable source. All users of the WOK community can create and send questions in the WikiMaster app. During 2017 WOK plans to enlarge the existing database of questions currently available in English, Arabic, Swedish and French to Hindu, Portuguese and Spanish.

== Apps ==
=== WikiMaster ===
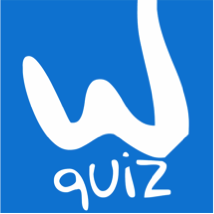

WikiMaster app was launched as WOKwiki on 15 January 2016 in Google Play and AppStore. In early 2017 the app changed name to WikiMaster. In WikiMaster you have access to Wikipedia in 11 languages. All Wikipedia articles can be found by a search function using the API provided by Wikipedia. On top of a Wikipedia article a function of quiz is added. If questions exist in WOK database and are indexed with same keyword or tag as the name of the Wikipedia article by any user the question is available in the Wikipedia article and a quiz exist to this Wikipedia article. If no questions are indexed, no quiz is available. Only the members of WOK add questions and tags. No bot or automatic procedure is used.

On all Wikipedia articles questions can be created with a five step by step procedure. A question created can be tagged by any other woker enhance the questions in other related articles on a broad and granular level. A question about a football player can be adequately tagged to the Wikipedia article Sport, Associated Football, a club in which the football player play in, a championship related to the question as well as the article about the football player him/herself and so on. The usefulness of WOK is therefore similar to Wikipedia over time in sense the more questions on top of Wikipedia articles, the more useful for the community finding relevant content to be quizzed in for educational purpose like learning a subject in education. Questions can have images attached from Wikimedia Commons. No other images can be uploaded to questions, thus enhance the interconnection with Wikipedia.

All quiz in WikiMaster can be played alone by the registered user or played with other workers in a challenge. Challenges are independent of time for each woker to play. All WOKer get points called WOkbits based on correct questions, created questions, challenge wins and alerts. And notifications of events as common in social media apps. All WOKbits counts in a universal score-system in all apps. A WikiMaster can be reached on allocated WOKbits on article level, in a city, country or the World. And on different time periods.

=== WikiFlip ===
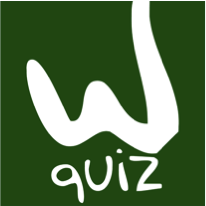

WikiFlip is an app developed by WOKcraft in the end of 2016 aiming to use the images uploaded to Wikipedia Commons and used as a part of questions in WOK added in WikiMaster. With over 80000 questions in database with images associated from Wikimedia Commons, WikiFlip user can search any Wikipedia article and find questions in WOK related and take them by a click on the image.

Using Wikimedia Commons images uploaded by users in Wikipedia community and questions created by the WOK community WikiFlip benefit the learning process by many students in need for learning in a new way. WOK claim to have "released the images captured by the Wikipedia text". Any answered flips can be reviewed and tags associated with the question can be flipped or the Wikipedia article opened in WikiMaster.

WOKers can reach as many correct questions flipped as possible in a row.

=== Quiz King ===
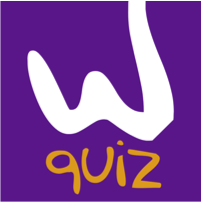

Quiz King is the first app developed by WOK that is still in AppStore and Google Play in 2014. The quiz game is based on questions from the WOK community. Players play 5 rounds with four questions from a main category, chosen out of 22 categories. Each player chose a category and answer same questions in the round. The quicker correct answer is given, the more WOKbits is given.
