= Jajah =

VoIP provider

Jajah Web
- Developer: JAJAH Inc.
- Final release: 1.1 (build 1718) / March 14, 2007
- Operating system: Cross-platform
- Type: VoIP
- Website: None

Jajah was a VoIP (Voice over IP) provider, founded by Austrians Roman Scharf and Daniel Mattes in 2005. The Jajah headquarters was located in Mountain View, CA, United States, and Luxembourg. Jajah maintained a development centre in Israel. On 23 December 2009, it was announced that Jajah had been bought by Telefónica through its subsidiary Telefónica Europe. In December 2013, Telefónica announced that Jajah would shut down at the end of January 2014.

Jajah's primary service, Jajah Web, took an approach called web-activated telephony, using VoIP to connect traditional phones (landline or mobile). Calls were made without download or user-installed software, and in most cases at rates lower than those of traditional phone companies or even free of charge.

The company's competitors included Ribbit and IntelePeer.

== History ==
Jajah was founded in 2005 by Roman Scharf and Daniel Mattes. The first beta version of the Jajah Webphone, a proprietary peer-to-peer internet telephony (VoIP) softphone, was released in July 2005. Jajah Web version 1.0 (build 1708) released February 8, 2006. Jajah Web version 1.1 (build 1714) including conference calls was released September 12, 2006. On September 27, 2007, Jajah launches a solution named "Jajah Buttons" which enables small businesses or individuals to embed buttons on their Web sites to allow others to contact them by phone using the company's Internet telephony platform. Jajah Buttons caused a notable controversy when eBay removed and banned such buttons from auction listings in eBay's site, presumably to protect revenues from its own VOIP solution provided by Skype. On November 19, 2007, Jajah launched the Jajah Direct service, which enables users to make phone calls without having to be next to a computer. Jajah Direct is a phone service that allows you to make long-distance or international calls by calling a local number, it works with every phone. There are no free calls using this service. On April 28, 2008, Jajah provideds its proprietary telephony infrastructure, payment processing, and customer care to Yahoo! Messenger users using the platform for receiving calls from the PSTN network, or for making calls to land lines and mobile phones. Telefónica bought Jajah for a reported $207 million on December 23, 2009.

On April 14, 2011, Jajah announced a partnership with Globe Telecom to allow Filipinos living outside Philippines to call home at inexpensive rate. It announced November 30, 2012 that effective January 30, 2013, Yahoo! Messenger will no longer offer Yahoo! Voice Phone In and Phone Out capabilities, the co-branded landline and mobile phone service from Jajah.

On January 31, 2014, Jajah closed down its website and services.

== Jajah Web ==
Jajah Web connected existing traditional landline or mobile phones with calls that are set up via Jajah's Web site. Jajah claimed that their service worked with any standard web browser.

== Jajah Direct ==
Jajah Direct assigned local numbers to international contacts.

== Jajah Free Global Calling ==
Jajah launched a service offering free calls globally on June 27, 2006. The service is limited to specified geographic areas, and Jajah has also adopted a fair use policy which limits the amount of free Jajah calls.

Calls between registered Jajah users were free of charge for landline and mobile calls within the US, Canada, China, Singapore, Hong Kong, Thailand and apply also for landline calls to and within most European countries as well as Argentina, Australia, Israel, Japan, Malaysia, Mexico City, New Zealand, Venezuela and Zambia.

A limitation is that scheduled calls and conference calls cannot be free. In addition, Jajah's FAQ pages said that Jajah asks its customers to pay from time to time (every six weeks). If the user chose not to pay, Jajah would start charging as it would for a normal call. The lowest amount that could be credited to a user account (every six weeks, to retain the free minutes) was $10.

=== Facebook Calling ===
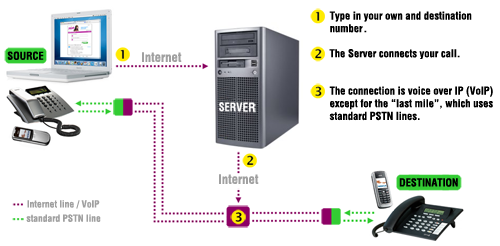
The process of establishing calls between two regular landline or mobile phones via VoIP

In April 2011, Jajah introduced a VoIP application for Android phones that can be used with Facebook contacts.
