= Dynamic Discount =

Dynamic Tariffing (also known as Dynamic Discounting or Dynamic Discount Solution) is the technology used by MTN Group, the Africa and Middle East telecoms provider, to operate MTN Zone, a prepaid-per-second billing price plan that offers potential discounts of up to 95 per cent on mobile phone calls for MTN prepaid subscribers making on-network calls.

Dynamic Tariffing is a charging solution that is able to offer a mobile network customer a discount based on the amount of capacity available at their current location in the network. The software looks at the GSM radio network from where the customer is calling and assesses the amount of capacity available in the network. Depending on the amount of capacity available, the customer is awarded a discount that appears on customer mobile handset screens. This discount is available for the duration of the phone call. The discount available to customer changes periodically depending on the amount of capacity available at their specific location in the network. The more capacity there is at their location, the higher the discount that is offered.

Digitata is the inventor of the Dynamic Tariffing™ System (DTS). DTS provides mobile network operators with a unique platform to attract new customers, retain the existing customer base and generate profitable revenues, while protecting the quality of the mobile network (GSM and WCDMA).

== History ==
MTN Zone was co-developed by MTN South Africa and Ericsson, a leading provider of telecommunication and data communication systems, and was tested in Grahamstown, South Africa. MTN Zone is available from MTN South Africa, and MTN Ghana and several other MTN operations across Africa.

== Rationale ==
The purposes of Dynamic Tariffing have been described as: increase utilization of spare capacity in the mobile telecoms network and at the same time reduce congestion during peak calling periods; differentiate the price for different locations in the network, dependent on network load; offering specific subscriber discounts and more affordable communication services; and changing subscriber behaviour (e.g. calling patterns, ARPU {Average Revenue Per User}, acquisition and loyalty).
