= Church of Scientology International =

Corporation operated by the Church of Scientology

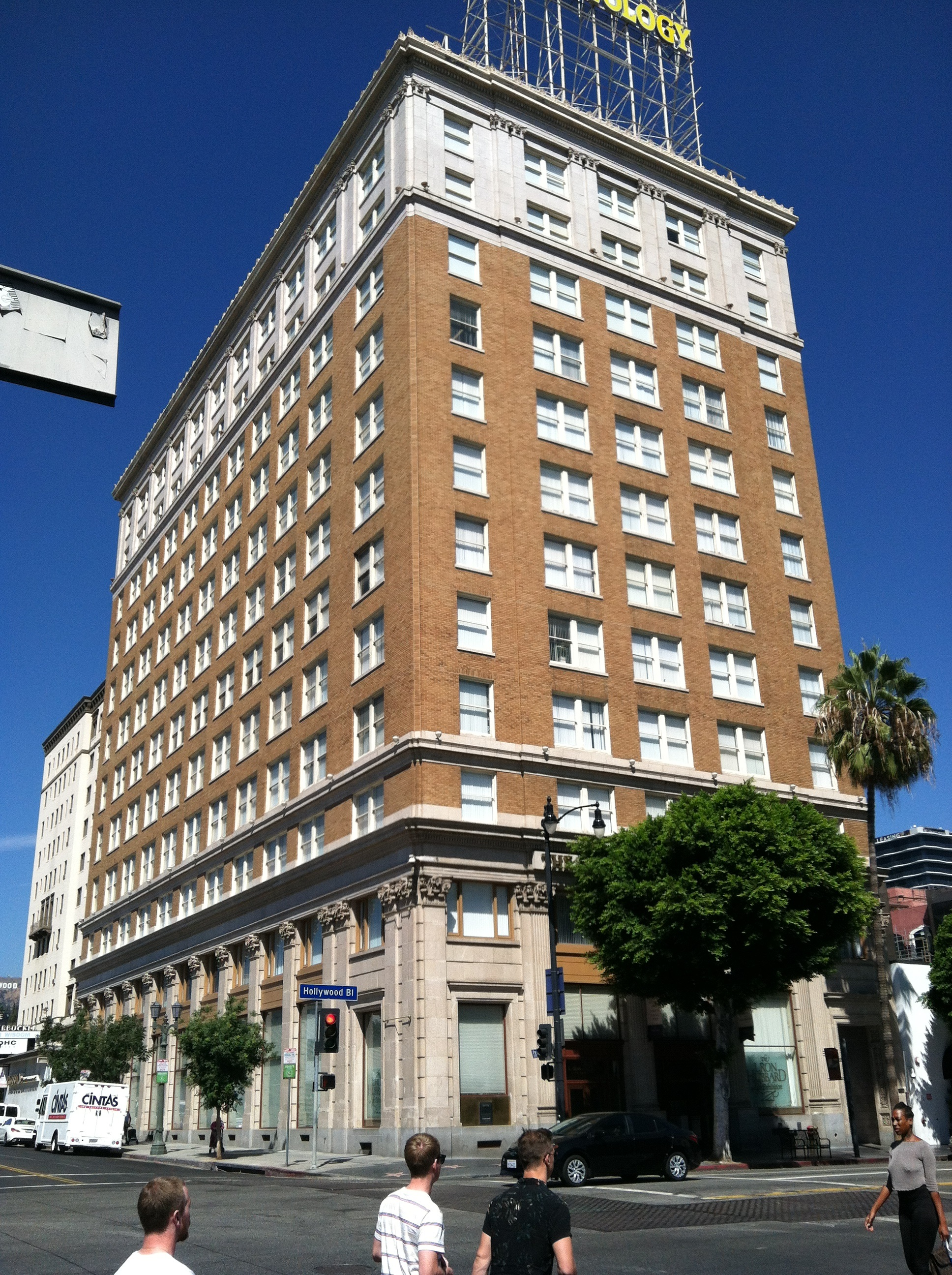
- Headquarters of the Church of Scientology International in Los Angeles
- Formation: 1981
- Type: Non-profit
- Purpose: Management over the Church of Scientology network
- Headquarters: 6331 Hollywood Boulevard, Los Angeles, California, 90028, USA
- Publication: Freedom; International Scientology News
- Website: scientology.org

The Church of Scientology International (CSI) is a California non-profit corporation within the worldwide network of Scientology organizations. CSI is referred to as the "mother church" of the Church of Scientology, managing church growth and compliance with standards of the teachings of Scientology's founder, L. Ron Hubbard.

In a 1993 memorandum by CSI to the Internal Revenue Service about CSI's role and functions, its personnel and its income:

CSI [...] is the Mother Church of the Scientology religion, with ecclesiastical authority over the ministry of religious services to parishioners by all subordinate churches within the ecclesiastical hierarchy. This church has a staff of approximately 990 individuals and an annual budget of approximately $46.8 million, based on its annual disbursements for the most recent year for which financial statements are available."

== Corporate information ==
The Church of Scientology International (CSI) was incorporated in California in 1981. As of 2023, CSI's principal address is 6331 Hollywood Boulevard, Los Angeles 90028, in the Hollywood Guarantee Building, one of the many Scientology properties. CSI also operates facilities at Gold Base in Gilman Hot Springs, California.

On September 21, 1993, the following Scientology officials held positions at CSI: the board of trustees was Mark Rathbun, Ray Mithoff, Mark Ingber, Marc Yager and John Eastment; the board of directors were Jens Uhrskov, Michael Rinder and Guillaume Lesèvre; Heber Jentzsch was the president, Brian Anderson was vice-president, Lynn Farny was secretary, Leslie Browning was assistant secretary and Jonathan Epstein was treasurer.

On August 18, 1993, CSI filed an application for tax exemption under section 501(c)3) of the Internal Revenue Code, and on September 3, 1993 a request for "group exemption" for all the affiliated Class V organizations. In the same year, the Internal Revenue Service (IRS) granted CSI's request for exemption.

The granting of tax exemption to CSI and other Scientology corporations was preceded by years of continuous litigation between the IRS and the various entities of Scientology. According to former high-ranking executives, the Scientology organization had launched about 200 lawsuits against the IRS until 1991. During the same time, individual parishioners of Scientology had initiated 2,300 claims against the agency, challenging the denial of tax deduction for their services at Scientology organizations. In 1991, the dispute over Scientology's tax-exempt status began to resolve through high-level meetings between David Miscavige and the then Commissioner of the IRS, Fred Goldberg, who encouraged a final resolution of the legal battle.

== Main corporate activities ==
Within the corporate structure of the Scientology network, the Religious Technology Center owns the right to license the Scientology trademarks and service marks through a so-called "assignment agreement" between RTC and the founder of Scientology, L. Ron Hubbard on May 16, 1982.

RTC and CSI entered a license agreement on May 18, 1982, granting CSI, the new "Mother Church of Scientology," the right to use and sub-license certain of the trademarks and service marks.

Additionally RTC and CSI signed on January 1, 1982, an "Organizational Covenant" granting CSI the right to deliver the "Advanced Technology" to its staff members.

CSI presents itself as the "mother church" of the Scientology religion. In this function, it exercises through various agreements with its subordinate organizations worldwide ultimate corporative control over those organizations and their activities.

In particular, CSI has entered the following types of agreements with other organizations:

- License Agreements that regulate the use of the service marks and trademarks in a similar way as between RTC and the AOs. In its function as sub-licensor, CSI has entered such agreements for example with the Church of Scientology Flag Service Organization, Inc., Scientology Missions International or the Church of Scientology Western United States (prior "Church of Scientology of San Diego");
- Service Agreements regulate the training of the organizations employees by CSI in its headquarters and the monetary compensation by the organizations;
- "Ecclesiastical Support Agreements," which acknowledge CSI's dominant role and control over all the functions and activities of the subordinate organizations and which guarantee a steady, weekly payment of 12.5% of the organizations' net income towards CSI. The organization has entered such agreements for example with the Church of Scientology Flag Service Organization, Inc. and the Church of Scientology Western United States;
- "Contracts Respecting Certain Religious Documents." These contracts regulate the use of files that the organizations has on their members and their staff. Ultimately it gives CSI the authority to control the use of them;
- "Motion Picture Exhibition Agreements" guarantee CSI the weekly payment of 11% of the revenue by the individual organizations for their use of Scientology training courses. It also forces the organizations to use certain equipment, such as tape recorders, which CSI provides for the same use. CSI has entered such agreements for example with the Church of Scientology Flag Service Organization, Inc. and the Church of Scientology Western United States.

== Organizational structure and management ==
CSI consists of a numerous corporations and unincorporated entities that are connected together by contracts and, more importantly, by the internal policies and the so-called "Scientology command channels", which define their activities.

Specifically CSI consists of the following principal organizations:

- The "Watchdog Committee" (WDC), an entity, is the highest management organization within CSI. Excluding RTC, it has the final say over all financial and personnel matters within the "Command Channels" of Scientology. In the "Command Channels" booklet its purpose is meagerly described as "establishing management units." WDC is headed by the WDC Chairman, who at the same time holds the position of "Commanding Officer" of the "Commodore's Messenger Organization International" (CMO Int.). The Commodore's Messenger Organization is an enforcement and internal investigation unit, which operates on behalf of the WDC. CMO International also comprises the office of the "Senior Case Supervisor International" (C/S Int.), a technical supervision unit, the "LRH Personal Public Relations Office International" (LRH PPRO) and the "International Finance Office", an office that supervises through its "Finance network" all financial matters of the various organizations.
- Golden Era Productions is another CSI-entity that is located at Gilman Hot Springs, California. It is the organization that is responsible for the production of Scientology films, audiotapes and E-meters and conducts worldwide marketing campaigns for Dianetics and Scientology.

- The "International Network of Computer Organized Management" (INCOMM) hosts the internal communications system and computer data banks. It safeguards all reports that are received by the Scientology management from the other organizations, as stated by CSI in an exhibit of CSI's application for tax-exempt status.
- The "Senior Executive Strata," stands below the WDC. It is composed of the "International Management Executive Committee" (IMEC) and its staff. IMEC is considered as the strategic management unit within CSI, which does the planning, evaluation and the long-term management of Scientology organizations worldwide, as described in the "Command Channels"-booklet. IMEC is led by the "Executive Director International".
- The next lower management unit is the "Flag Command Bureaux" (FCB). FCB includes various sub-entities, management units, networks and corporations. Among them are:
- The supervising authority "Flag Network Coordination Committee" (FNCC). This entity is composed of the heads of the different management units within the FCB under the guidance of the "Commanding Officer FCB." The FNCC supposedly meets on a daily basis and coordinates the activities of the networks within the FCB.
- The "LRH Communicator Network" (LRH Comm.). It is an internal investigation unit, that manages 3 other networks, designed for the "preservation and application of standard tech and admin(istration)" within the lower organizations of the Scientology network.
- The "Finance Network" (a lower extension of the International Finance Network), which micromanages the finances of the local and regional Scientology organizations.
- The Office of Special Affairs International (OSA Int.). It is the unit, which supervises and controls the Office of Special Affairs network. This unit manages and controls the legal and intelligence operations of the Church of Scientology on a worldwide basis.
- The "Flag Bureaux" (FB). This is the entity that directly manages the Church of Scientology Flag Service Organization, Inc. (FSO) in Clearwater, the Church of Scientology Flag Ship Service Organization (FSSO) in Netherlands Antilles, the Celebrity Centre International (CC Int.) in Los Angeles, the organization "I HELP," which licenses "Field Auditors" and the "Flag Liaison Offices" (FLOs), "continental" management units that direct the lower organizations and missions on their specific "Scientology-continent."
- The organization Scientology Missions International (SMI). This is a Californian non-profit corporation, which controls and directs the "continental" SMI-offices and licenses the individual "Missions," smaller or "beginner" organizations of the Scientology-network.
- World Institute of Scientology Enterprises International (WISE Int.), a Californian non-profit corporation, which controls and directs the "continental" WISE-offices and licenses independent Scientology businesses that use and sell the "LRH administrative technology."
- The Association for Better Living and Education International (ABLE Int.), a Californian non-profit corporation, which controls and directs the "continental" ABLE-offices and directs two other non-profit corporations Narconon International and Applied Scholastics International. The latter two are organizations, which propagate Scientology's anti-drug and literacy programs.
- Bridge Publications, Inc. (BPI), a non-profit corporation from Los Angeles, California, which is Scientology's publication's organization. It is marketing Scientology books and magazines within the United States and Canada.
- New Era Publications International, ApS (New Era), a for-profit corporation from Copenhagen, Denmark, which operates through numerous affiliated organizations in countries that are not covered by BPI's operations. These are mostly non-English speaking countries.

== See also ==
- List of Scientology organizations
- Scientology officials
- Church of Spiritual Technology
