= Jumio =

Identity verification service firm

- Type: Private
- Industry: Identity verification services
- Founded: 2010; 16 years ago
- Founder: Daniel Mattes
- Headquarters: Sunnyvale, California, USA
- Number of locations: Sunnyvale, CA; Linz, Austria; Vienna, Austria; London, UK
- Key people: Mark Lorion (CEO); Bala Kumar (President); James Cook (GC)
- Services: Identity Verification Services
- Website: www.jumio.com

Jumio is an online mobile payment and identity verification company that offers card and ID scanning and validation products for mobile and web transactions. They sell these products under the brand name "Netverify Trusted Identity as a Service."

== History ==
Jumio was founded in 2010 by Daniel Mattes and backed by Andreessen Horowitz and Eduardo Saverin (co-founder of Facebook), among others. Mattes resigned in 2015 following an internal board investigation. Stephen Stuut took over as CEO in 2016, and Jumio filed for Chapter 11 bankruptcy in March of that year. Jumio was subsequently acquired by Centana Growth Partners in May.

In August of the same year, Jumio raised $15 million from the private equity firm Millennium Technology Value Partners and Centana Growth Partners.

The company raised $150 million in March 2021 and was named "Best Fraud Prevention Solution" by the 2023 Tech Ascension Awards.

At the start of 2026, Bala Kumar replaced Robert Prigge as president and interim CEO. Later in 2026, Mark Lorion was appointed chief executive officer. Kumar remained president.

=== Legal Battles ===
When Jumio declared bankruptcy, a shareholder filed a lawsuit against Eduardo Saverin, one of the company’s backers, and other former executives for gross mismanagement of the company’s finances. A spokesperson for Saverin stated that the lawsuit had "no merit."

In 2019, the Securities and Exchange Commission charged Mattes with defrauding investors. Mattes agreed to settle the charges for over $17 million. According to the SEC complaint, Mattes had grossly overstated Jumio's revenue in 2013 and 2014 and then sold his personal shares to investors for $14 million, concealing these sales from the board. In 2015, the company corrected its financial results and filed for bankruptcy in 2016.

Around the same time, the SEC settled a separate case against Chad Starkey, former CFO of Jumio, for his involvement in Mattes's actions. The settlement required Starkey to make a payment of approximately $420,000. In February 2023, Jumio faced litigation as the provider of Binance's biometric services. An Illinois resident claimed that Jumio violated the state's Biometric Information Privacy Act (BIPA), by collecting and storing the biometric data of Binance customers. Jumio sought to have the case dismissed, but a judge ruled that the case had merit.

== Awards ==
In 2021, Jumio won Gold in the IT World Awards.

In 2024, Jumio won the Globee Awards for Cybersecurity.
