= Gel (disambiguation) =

A gel is a complex solid but fluid substance with liquid-like properties.

Gel may also refer to:

== Personal care ==
- Hair gel, a gel used for setting hair styles which makes it stay still
- Shower gel, a cosmetic body wash
- Personal lubricant used for sexual purposes

== Pharmaceutics and physical chemistry ==
- Gel cap, a gelatinous capsule in which a drug is held
- Aerogel, a gel that has been dehydrated under supercritical conditions such that the liquid has been replaced with gas
- Hydrogel or aquagel, a water-insoluble polymer
- Sol-gel, a colloidal suspension that can be gelled to form a solid
- Xerogel, a dried gel that, when heated, becomes a dense glass

== Entertainment ==
- Color gel, a transparent colored material used to shade stage lighting for plays and film
- Gel, a fictional character in the manga series Hunter × Hunter
- Gel, American hardcore punk band
- Gel, 1995 single by Collective Soul

== Other uses ==
- Gel (dessert), a dessert made with sweetened and flavored gelatin
- Gel conference
- Gel pen
- Gelling (Arunachal Pradesh), location in India
- Georgian lari, by ISO 4217 currency code
- Group Exemption Letter, issued by the United States Internal Revenue Service
- Lichk, Armenia, formerly Gël
- Silica gel
- ut-Ma'in language

== See also ==
- Agar
- Collagen
- Colloid
- Gelatin
- Jelly (disambiguation)
