= Ribbit (telecommunications company) =

- Type: Subsidiary
- Industry: Telecommunications
- Founded: February 23, 2006
- Headquarters: Mountain View, United States
- Key people: Ted Griggs, co-founder, CEO; Crick Waters, [(co-founder, EVP)]; Peter Leong [(co-founder)], Ramani Narayan [(co-founder, VP)]
- Number of employees: 90
- Parent: BT Group
- Website: Ribbit.com

Ribbit was a telecommunications company based in Mountain View, California. It was acquired by BT Group on July 29, 2008, for $105 million.

On August 10, 2011, Ribbit announced it was closing most of its external-facing operations and developer program within a couple of months. The company was subsequently integrated into BT's Technology, Service and Operations division.

The company's goal was to make voice communications a programmable feature, one that can be easily added to Web pages and software applications. Its competitors included IntelePeer and Jajah.

== History ==
Ribbit was founded on February 23, 2006. The company received a total $13 million in funding from venture capitalists Alsop-Louie Partners, Allegis Capital and KPG Ventures. Ribbit officially launched on December 17, 2007. BT Group then acquired the company on July 29, 2008, for $105 million. The company made its platform for application developers public in November 2008.

== Products & Services ==
Ribbit offered a platform that allowed application developers to interact with telephone networks.

Ribbit Platform was a multiprotocol, cloud-based environment for programmable communications. Developers, ISVs, and carriers could use Ribbit Platform tools and APIs to add voice, SMS text messaging, and other communications features to any Web page or application. Developers could directly access Ribbit's global phone network using Flex, Flash, Java, PHP, .Net, Silverlight, and other familiar programming tools.

Ribbit Mobile was a software service built on the Ribbit Platform that linked landline and mobile phones to the Internet, allowing people who use the service to manage all their calls and messages in one place. Voicemail messages were automatically transcribed and sent to users as email and SMS texts. Ribbit Mobile worked with users’ existing phone numbers. Ribbit Mobile also allowed users to make calls directly from their computers.

Ribbit for Salesforce was a software service built on the Ribbit Platform that linked mobile voice communications to email, SMS text messaging, and Salesforce CRM. Ribbit for Salesforce was voted “Best Mobile App of 2008” by Salesforce customers. Sales professionals could use Ribbit for Salesforce to save voicemail, email, SMS text messages, voice memos, and recorded meeting notes in Salesforce and automatically map communications to sales contacts and opportunities. Voicemail messages were automatically transcribed so they could be easily read, saved, searched, and forwarded.

Bring Your Own Network (BYON) was a program that allowed telecommunications carriers to offer Ribbit Mobile and Ribbit for Salesforce to their customers as an add-on service. In addition, the program enabled carriers to use Ribbit Platform tools and APIs to develop new consumer services based on Ribbit's global phone network. Carriers could use Ribbit to avoid long development lead times, staff, and equipment costs associated with rolling out new services.
