= Daniel Mattes =

Austrian businessman

- Born: 14 November 1972 (age 53); Freiburg, West Germany.
- Occupations: Founder & CEO of 42.cx Founder of Jumio; Co-Founder of Jajah; Co-Founder of Auftrag.at
- Years active: 2005–present
- Spouse: Karolina Zubkova Mattes
- Children: 3
- Parent(s): Manfred Mattes; Edeltraud Mattes

Daniel Mattes (born 14 November 1972) is an Austrian internet entrepreneur and venture capitalist. He is the founder and was CEO of artificial intelligence company 42.cx and a judge and business angel on the Austrian television show '2 Minuten 2 Millionen', the Austrian version of Shark Tank, which airs on Puls4.

His 42.cx Center of Excellence for Artificial Intelligence focused on the commercialization of artificial intelligence ("AI"). The company was based in Vienna, Austria. It was incorporated in November 2015 and removed from the Austrian register of companies in 2022.

Prior to 42.cx, in 2010, he founded Jumio, an online authentication company.

Prior to Jumio, in 2005, he founded VoIP company Jajah, which was acquired in 2009 for $207 million by Telefónica.

== Professional life ==
- In 1999, Mattes co-founded "Auftrag.at".
- In 2005, Mattes co-founded Jajah.
- In 2010, Mattes founded Jumio.
- In 2015, Mattes founded 42.cx Center of Excellence for Artificial Intelligence.

== Publications ==
- 2000 "Datenbanken mit Delphi" publisher: C&L-Verlag
- 2001 "SQL – Der Einsatz im Intra- und Extranet" publisher: C&L-Verlag
- 2002 "Datenbanken mit Delphi, 2. Auflage" publisher: C&L Verlag
- 2019 "IP Assets: An Awakening in the Market?"
