= Value-added service =

Telecommunications industry term

A value-added service (VAS) is a popular telecommunications industry term for non-core services, or, in short, all services beyond standard voice calls and fax transmissions. However, it can be used in any service industry, for services available at little or no cost, to promote their primary business. In the telecommunications industry, on a conceptual level, value-added services add value to the standard service offering, spurring subscribers to use their phone more and allowing the operator to drive up their average revenue per user. For mobile phones, technologies like SMS, MMS and data access were historically usually considered value-added services, but in recent years SMS, MMS and data access have more and more become core services, and VAS therefore has begun to exclude those services.

Mobile VAS services can be categorized into:

- Consumer behavior VAS
- Network VAS
- Enterprise VAS

A distinction may also be made between standard (peer-to-peer) content and premium-charged content. These are called mobile value-added services (MVAS), which are often simply referred to as VAS.

Value-added services are supplied either in-house by the mobile network operator themselves or by a third-party value-added service provider, also known as a content provider such as All Headline News or Reuters.

Value-added service providers typically connect to the operator using protocols like Short message peer-to-peer protocol, connecting either directly to the short message service centre or, increasingly, to a messaging gateway that gives the operator better control of the content. Several other operators are approaching banking on possible revenue streams by building value-added services (VAS), which is generally available with rewards-based schemes.

== Major value-added services ==
- Live streaming
- Location-based services
- Missed call alerts and voicemail box
- Mobile advertising
- Mobile money and M-commerce based services
- Mobile TV and OTT services
- Ring tones
- Online gaming
- Ringback tone (RBT and RRBT)
- SMS chatting and dating premium services
- Infotainment services
- Stickering
- WAP content downloads
- Hello tune service
