= Jil =

Jil may refer to:

- Jil (film), a 2015 Indian Telugu-language action film
- Jil, Armenia
- Japan Institute of Labour
- Jaringan Islam Liberal, liberal Islam network in Indonesia
- Java Intermediate Language, a computer language
- Jesus Is Lord Church Worldwide, commonly known as Jesus Is Lord Church or JIL Church
- Jilin Ertaizi Airport, a military airport that formerly served commercial flights to Jilin City in Jilin Province, China
- Joint Innovation Lab, a joint venture between Vodafone, Verizon Wireless, China Mobile and SoftBank Mobile
- University of Pennsylvania Journal of International Law

== People ==
- Jil Caplan (born 1965), French singer-songwriter
- Jil Y. Creek, Austrian guitar virtuoso
- Kim Chil (1422–1478), also known as Kim Jil, scholar-official of the early Joseon Dynasty in Korea
- Jill Goodacre (born 1964), American actress and former model
- Jil Jarmyn (1926–2024), American actress, known for Tarzan's Fight for Life
- Jil Matheson, National Statistician for the United Kingdom
- Jil Sander (born 1943), minimalist German fashion designer
- Jil Tracy (born 1973), Republican member of the Illinois House of Representatives
- Salome Jil, pseudonym of José Milla y Vidaurre (1822–1882), Guatemalan writer

=== Fictional character ===
Jil, a heroes from Kamiyadori manga
