= Scientology Missions International =

Management for Scientology mission network

- Logo of Scientology Missions International
- Formation: 1981
- Type: Religious
- Legal status: Non-profit
- Purpose: Management for the network of Scientology missions
- Headquarters: 6331 Hollywood Boulevard, Los Angeles, California, 90028, USA
- Parent organization: Church of Scientology International
- Website: smi.org

Scientology Missions International (SMI) is a Californian 501(c)(3) non-profit corporation, which is located in Los Angeles, California. SMI is part of the Church of Scientology network.

While being a corporation, SMI is also a management entity, which is ecclesiastically integrated within the mother church of Scientology, the Church of Scientology International. SMI runs on a worldwide basis the so-called "Scientology Missions", which are beginner organizations within the Church of Scientology network. These Missions offer basic Dianetics and Scientology services to Scientology members and to the general public. The official website of SMI states the following about Scientology Missions and the functions of SMI:

... [A] Scientology Mission is the entrance point in Scientology for people of all faiths and walks of life. Here, people become introduced to Dianetics and Scientology technology. ... Scientology missions also preside over naming ceremonies, officiate over marriages and funerals and are there to assists those in distress. ... To assist missions in these endeavors, Scientology Missions International (SMI) was formed to act as the mother church for all missions. SMI's international offices provide guidance, help and direction for existing missions through a global network of continental offices. Through training manuals, apprenticeships, direct consultation, magazines, newsletters, promotion and a wealth of other materials, SMI provides the wherewithal new and existing missions need to function and expand. ..."

In a 1993 memorandum by the Church of Scientology International, the following information was provided to the Internal Revenue Service with regard to SMI's role, its personnel and its income:

... Missions ..., nearly 100 in the United States alone and over 250 worldwide, minister the lowest levels of religious services to parishioners within their localities. Missions are under the ecclesiastical authority of SMI, which in turn is under the ecclesiastical authority of CSI. SMI itself has a staff of approximately 26 individuals and an annual budget of approximately $2.6 million, based on its annual disbursements for the most recent year for which financial statements are available...."

== Corporate information ==
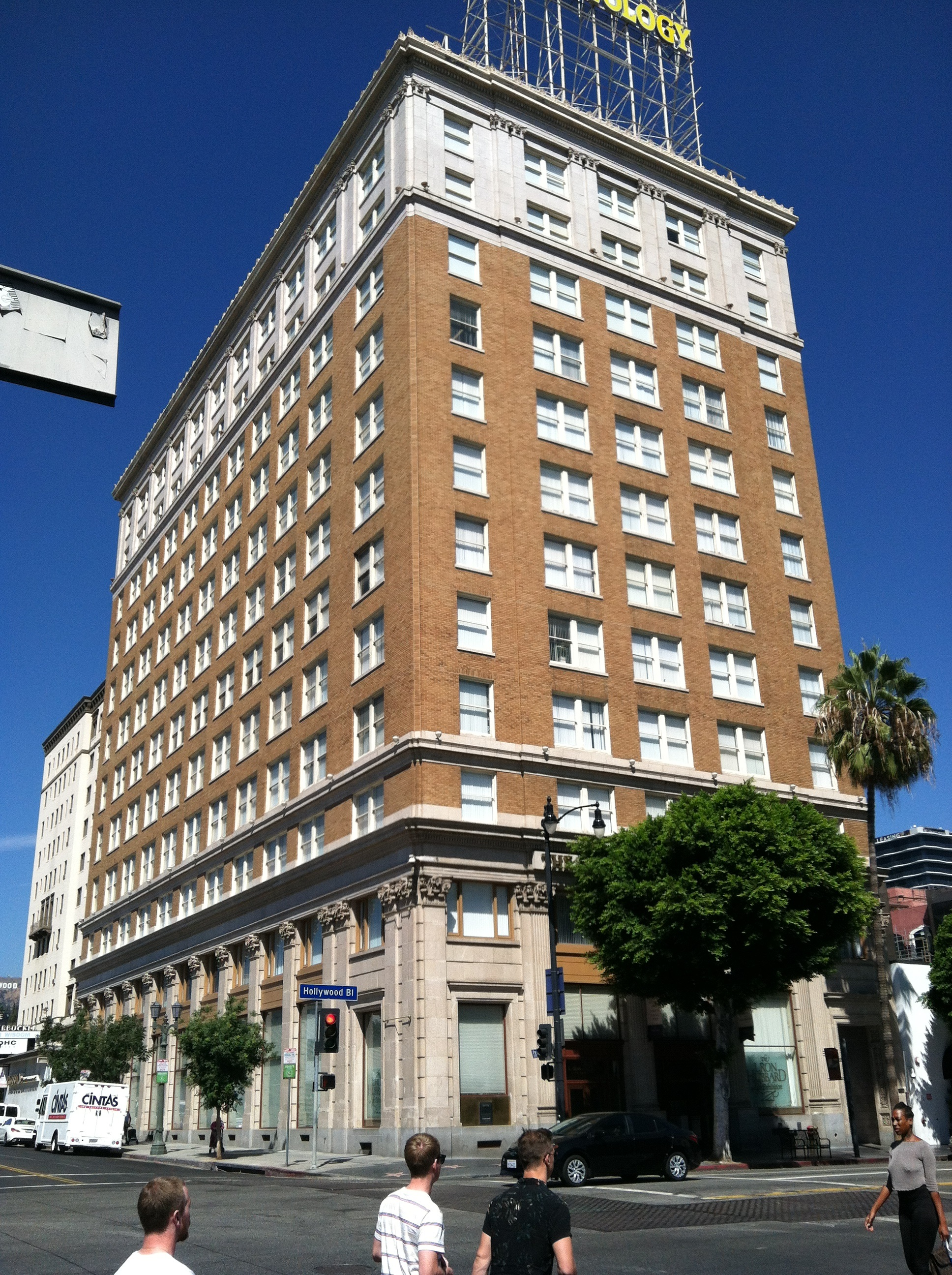
SMI offices are in the Scientology-owned Hollywood Guaranty Building

SMI was incorporated on December 22, 1981, in Los Angeles, California by its Trustees William J. Duckhorn, Edward E. Brewer and Cecilia P. Murray. On June 17, 1982, the Board of Trustees amended the Articles of Incorporation. The day after, on June 18, 1982, SMI's Board of Directors, then consisting of Roger C. Barnes, Karen Sue Campbell and Howard D. Becker, adopted the Bylaws of the newly created organization.

On September 21, 1993, the following individuals held corporate positions at SMI: The Board of Trustees was composed of Jonathan Epstein, Jessica Pruitt and Pablo Lobato. The members of SMI's Board of Directors at that time were Jean Discher, Bernard Radburn and Claire Edwards. SMI's President was Jean Discher, its Secretary and Treasurer Beate Gordon and its Assistant Secretary Bernard Radburn.

As of November 23, 2000, SMI's corporate officers were Richard Fear (Chief Executive Officer/President), Joi Marchant (Secretary) and Claire Edwards (Chief Financial Officer/Treasurer).

On August 18, 1993, SMI filed an application for tax exemption under section 501(c)(3) of the Internal Revenue Code and on September 3, 1993, a request for a "Group Exemption Ruling" for the affiliated Scientology Missions in the United States. In 1993, the Internal Revenue Service eventually granted SMI's requests for exemption.

The current official address of SMI is 6331 Hollywood Boulevard, Los Angeles, CA 90028—the Hollywood Guaranty Building. SMI operates from the same address as the Church of Scientology International and other sub-entities of CSI. SMI's official agent is Jeanne Caugan. Her official address is 3055 Wilshire Boulevard, Suite 900, Los Angeles, CA 90010.

=== Licensing of trademarks and service marks ===
Within the corporate structure of the Scientology network, the Religious Technology Center owns the right to license the Scientology trademarks and service marks through a so-called "assignment agreement" between RTC and the founder of Scientology, L. Ron Hubbard on May 16, 1982. RTC and CSI entered a license agreement on May 18, 1982, granting CSI, the new "Mother Church of Scientology," the right to use and sub-license certain of the trademarks and service marks.

As a consequence, CSI entered a license agreement with SMI on May 19, 1982, which granted the right to SMI to further license the Scientology trademarks and service marks of the Scientology Missions.

In the years following the signing of the agreement with CSI, SMI has entered various license agreements with Scientology Missions around the world over the use of the Scientology trademarks and service marks.

== Organizational structure and management ==
In addition to its corporate status, SMI is also a part of the ecclesiastical command structure of the international Church of Scientology management. Integrated within the mother church of Scientology, the Church of Scientology International, SMI is one of 8 sub-units and networks, which form the so-called "Flag Command Bureaux" (FCB). The Scientology management booklet The Command Channels of Scientology states the following about the FCB:

... The Flag Command Bureaux, so named from its origination aboard the Flagship Apollo, is the central point of tactical management for all the individual orgs and units of all the sectors of Scientology. The Flag Command Bureaux is the tactical level of management. It gets International Management plans, evaluations and programs done in all the individual orgs and units...."

Describing the purpose and functions of SMI, the "Command Channels" booklet sees SMI as a "tactical management unit which is in charge of and fully responsible for the expansion of the mission network." Furthermore, it states:

... Its purpose is to get missions functioning as Scientology's spearhead into the society and to hold wide open the entrance gates of the Bridge. This is achieved by getting the missions flooding their community with books, getting a huge volume of new public onto the Bridge through clearly delineated introductory routes with basic Scientology and Dianetics services well delivered, and by driving people further up the Bridge to orgs so they can train as auditors and go Clear and OT.

"SMI INT assists missions in accomplishing this by helping them execute tactical programs provided by the Senior Executive Strata. SMI INT sees that missions get their technical and administrative staff trained in orgs so they perform their functions.

"SMI INT is responsible for keeping missions inethics, in-tech and on-policy so they expand and fulfill their purpose of being a successful front-lines dissemination activity for Scientology which sends a high volume of new public, having successfully received basic services, on up to orgs.

"SMI INT also sees that new missions are opened and gotten productive. There should be 10 missions around every org, each actively sending a large flow of new public to its local org, thus contributing to its expansion up to and beyond the size of the old Saint Hill in its prime...."

== Missions of Scientology ==
SMI is the management organization over all the Missions of Scientology, which are run as franchises (and used to be called such). Prior to the decimation of the missions network in the early 1980s, the Church of Scientology claimed there were 173 missions around the world. Every Scientology-published book used to have a list of the churches and missions of Scientology, as did their websites, but this practice was ended.

Here are a few Scientology missions:

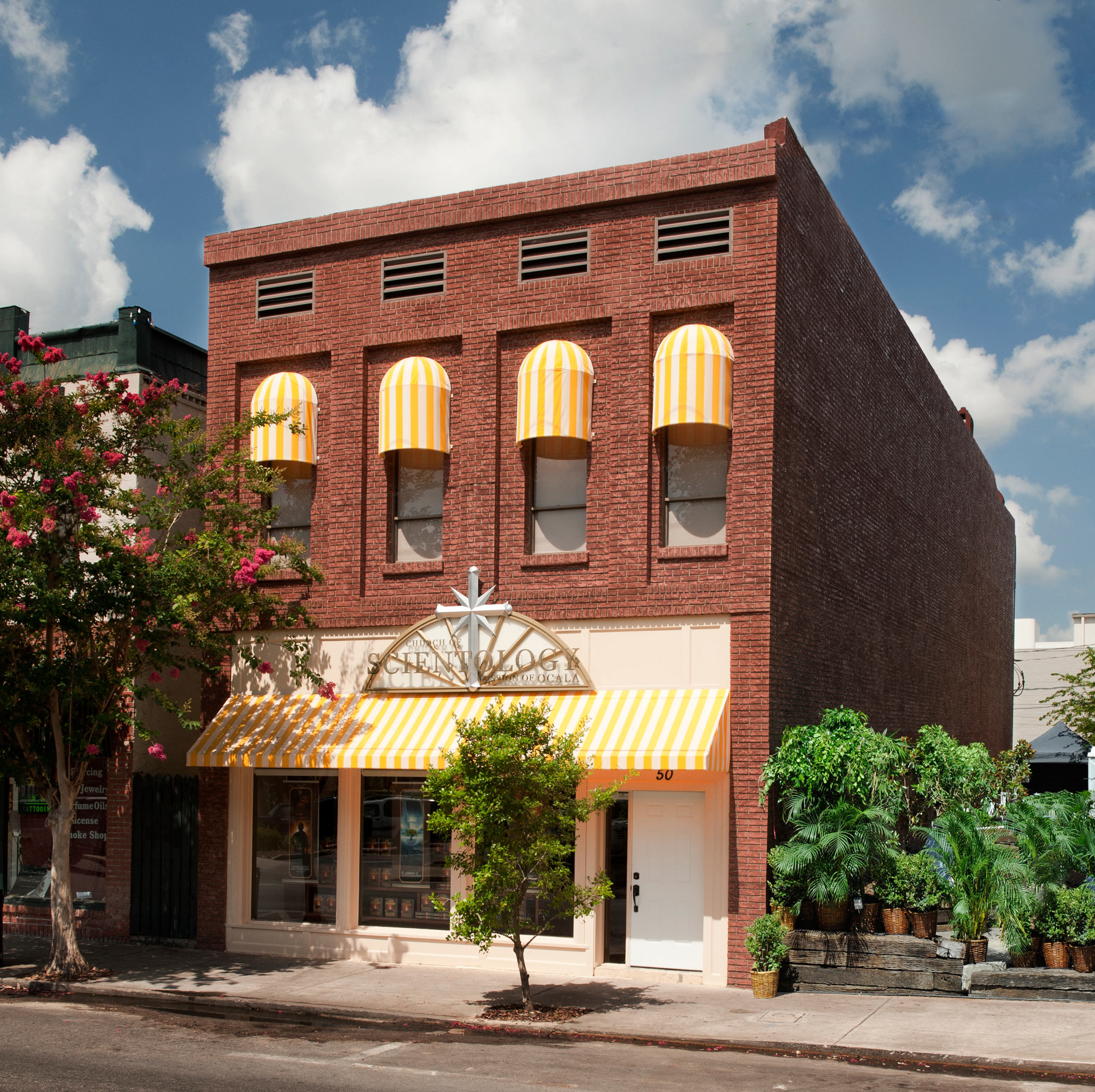
Mission in Ocala, Florida

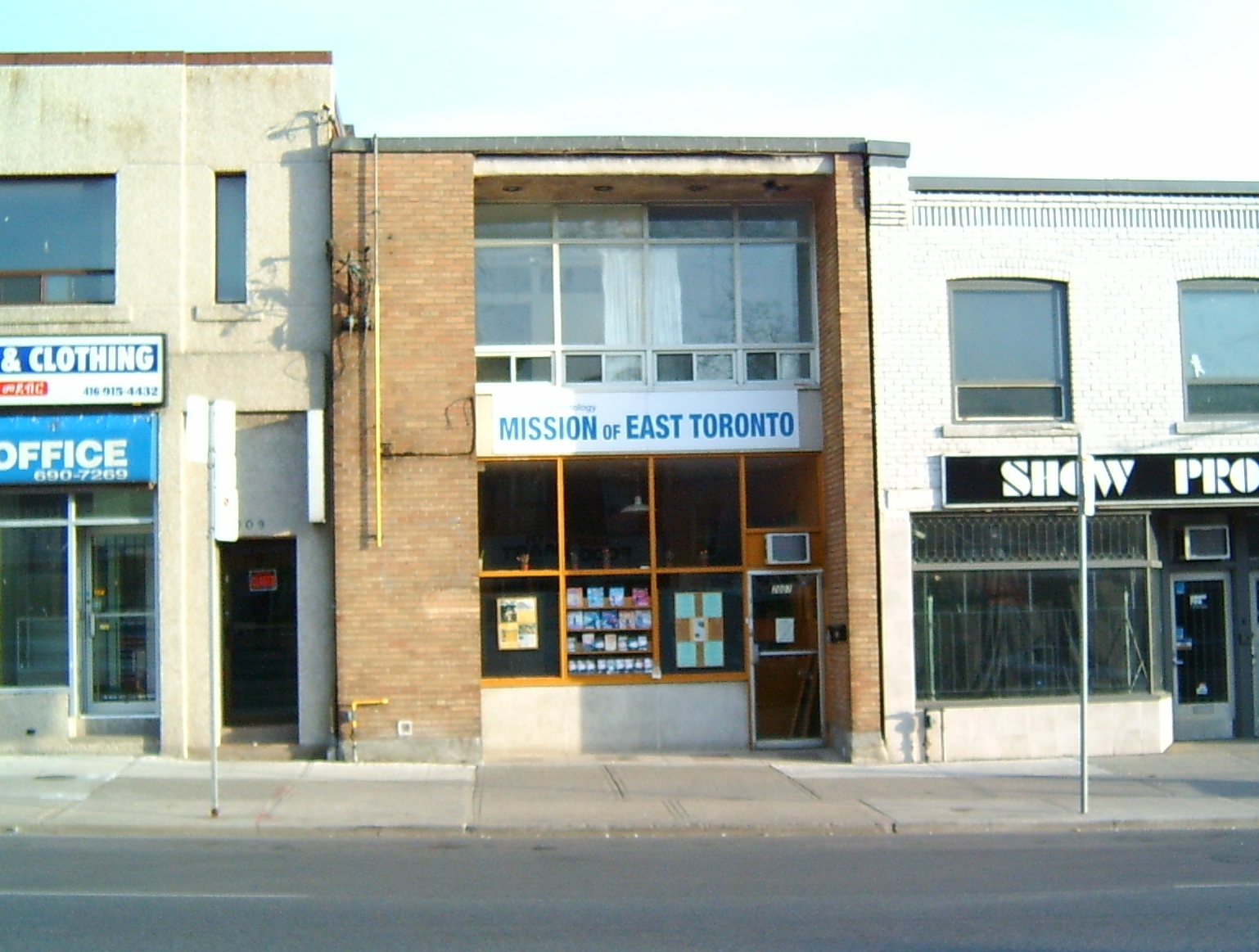
Mission in Toronto, Canada

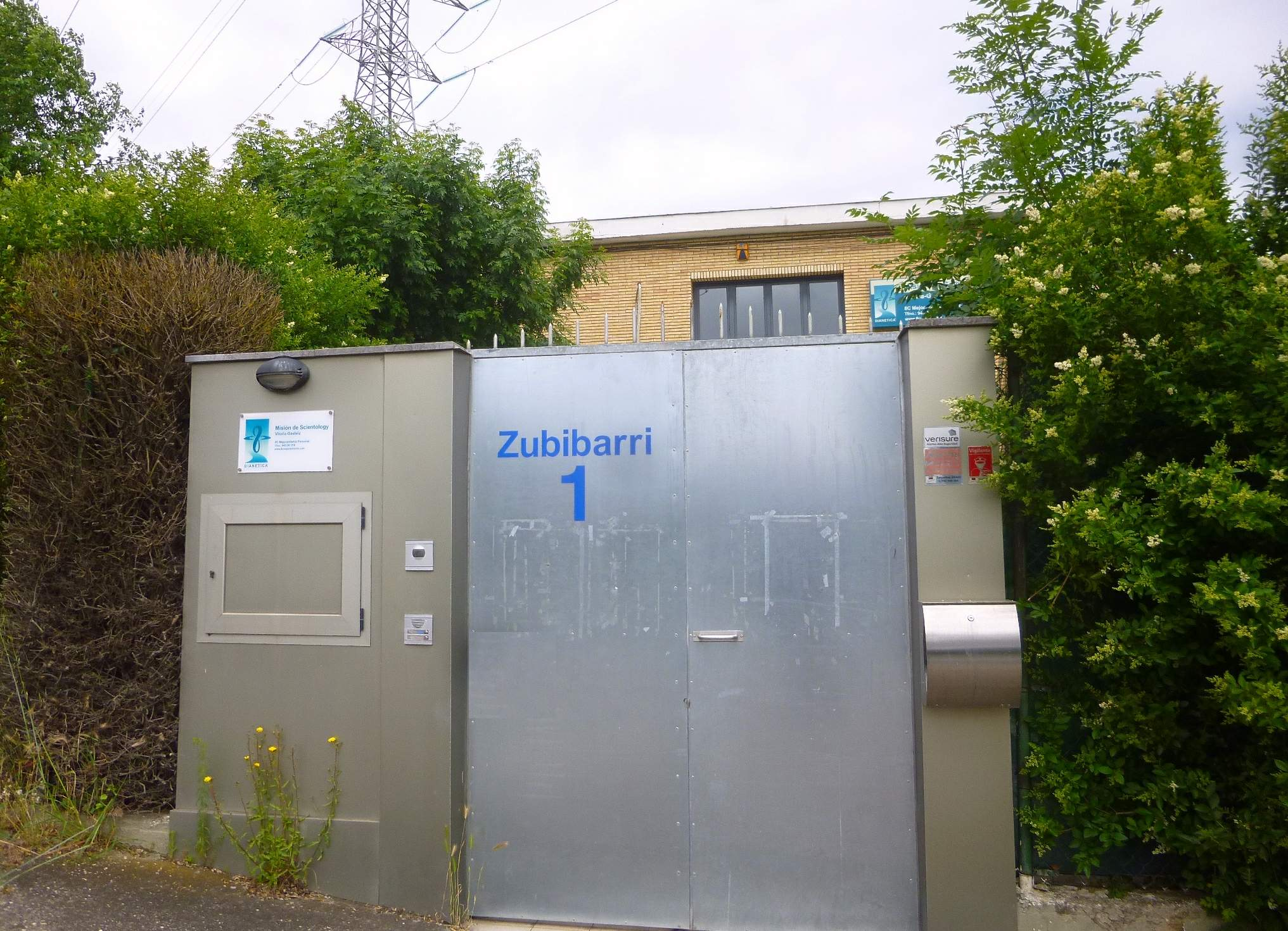
Mission in Vitoria, Spain

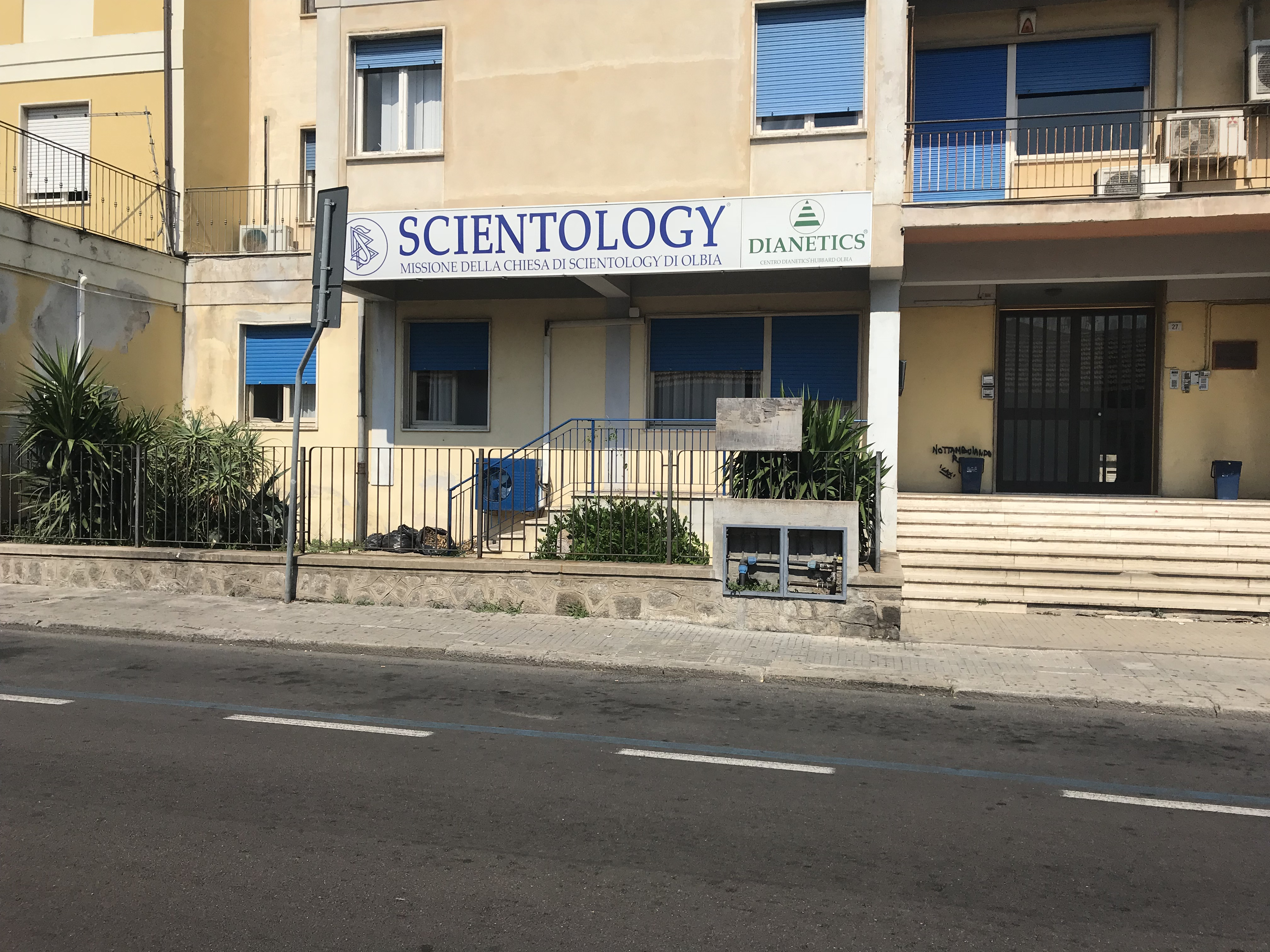
Mission in Sardinia, Italy

== See also ==
- List of Scientology organizations
