= Lichk =

Village in Gegharkunik, Armenia

Lichk Լիճք
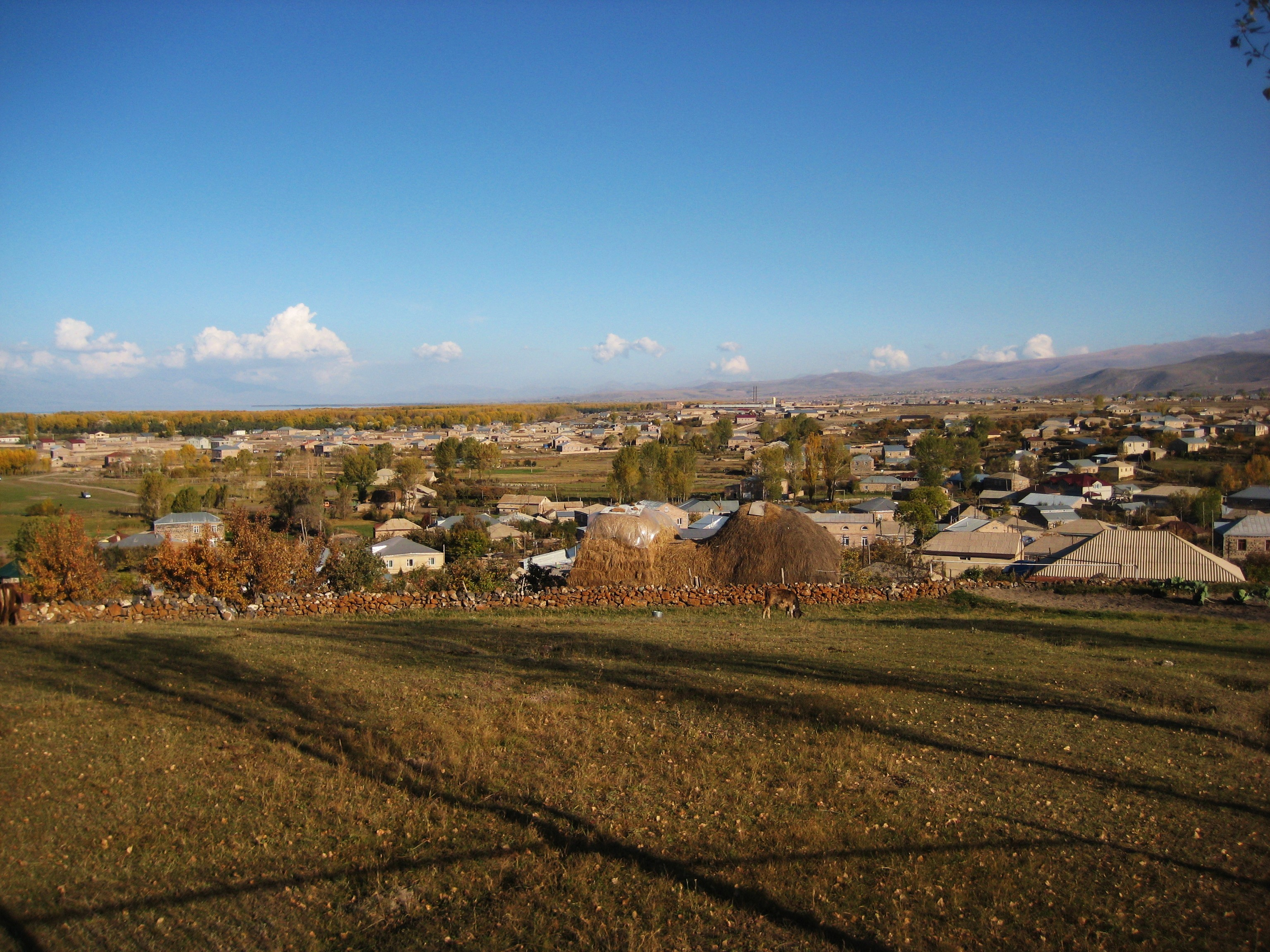
- A view of Lichk

- Location within Armenia Location within Gegharkunik
- Coordinates: 40°09′33″N 45°14′05″E
- Country: Armenia
- Province: Gegharkunik
- Municipality: Martuni
- Founded: 1829–1830

Area
  - Total: 5.10 km^{2} (1.97 sq mi)
- Elevation: 1,929 m (6,329 ft)

Population (2011)
  - Total: 5,417
  - Density: 1,060/km^{2} (2,750/sq mi)
- Time zone: UTC+4 (AMT)
- Postal code: 1409

Lichk (Armenian: Լիճք) is a village in the Martuni Municipality of the Gegharkunik Province of Armenia, located to the south of Lake Sevan.

== Etymology ==
The village was previously known as Gyol.

== History ==
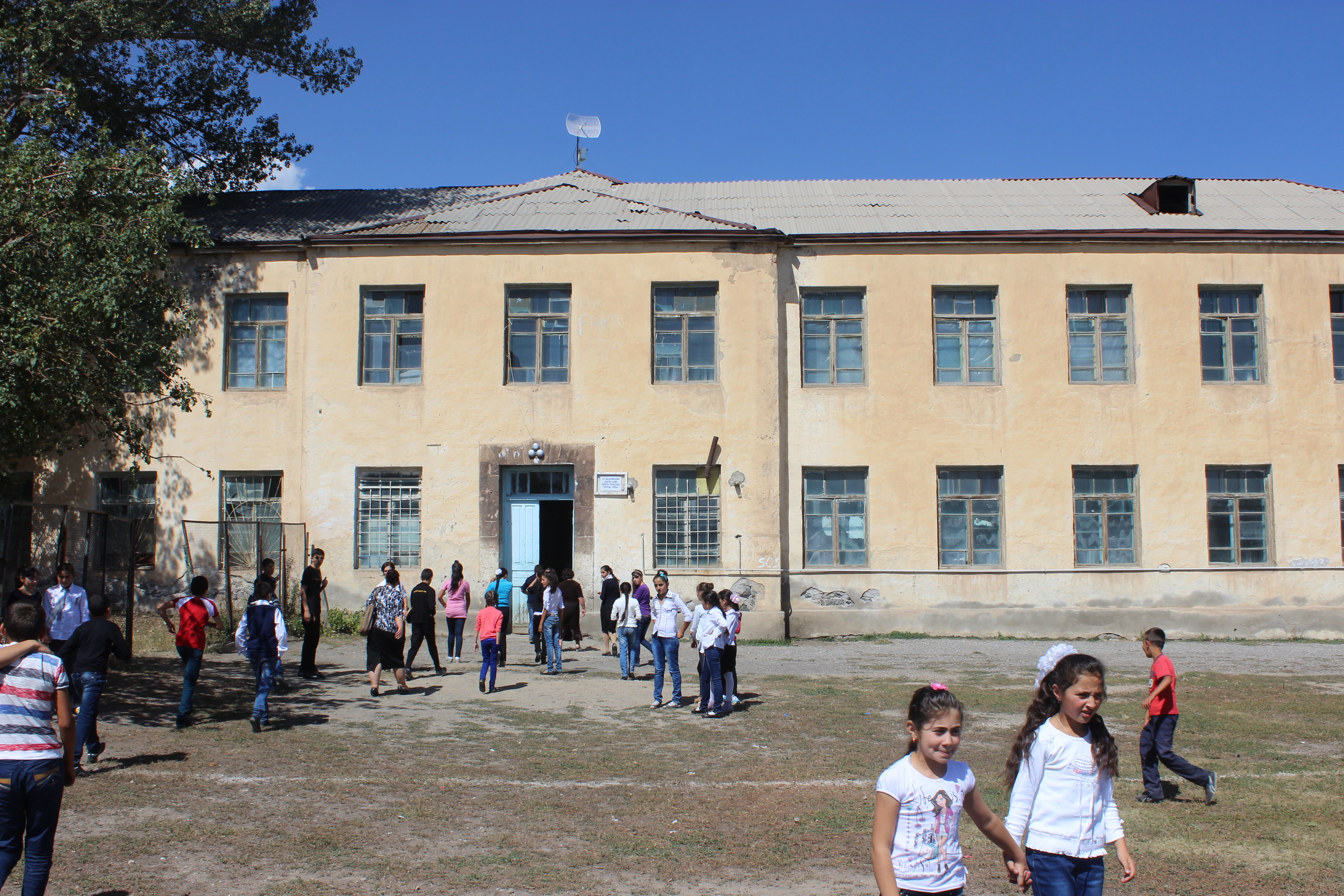
Primary School of Lichk, September 2014

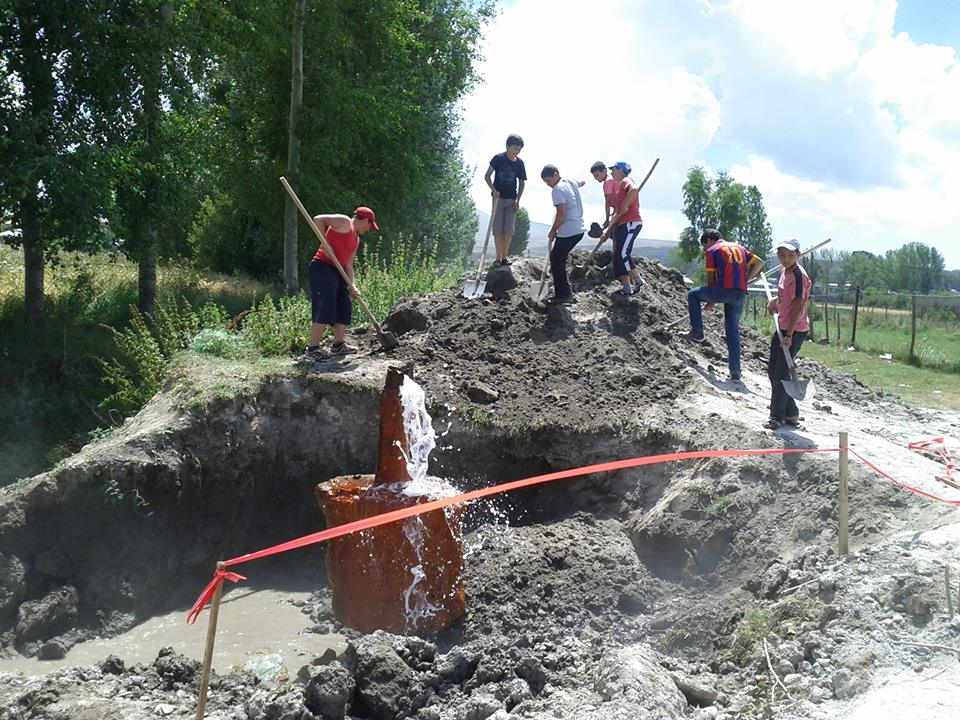
Residents attempt to repair damage to the village spring

The modern village of Lichk was officially founded in 1829–30. There are ruins of earlier habitation including the remains of a medieval town (Paul Village) in the area of the village. There are also the ruins of the early Tsaghkavank (meaning "Flowering Monastery") which sit adjacent to the church of St. Astvatsatsin at the hilltop cemetery. Tsaghkavank overlooks the village of Lichk, and the remaining lower walls are cylindrical walls with a very small entry. The reasoning behind this is that one would technically be forced to bow in respect upon entering the church. The church of St. Astvatsatsin is a small basilica with some broken khachkars and gravestones embedded into its walls. It is currently in disrepair as the roof has collapsed. Surrounding the two churches is a 13th-century cemetery with numerous interesting khachkars. Nearby is a cyclopean fort. Between 1950–60, an Aramaic inscription was found nearby.

== Education ==
Two public educational facilities currently serve the village. The Primary School was constructed in 1930 and served as the original school for Lichk. For a number of years, it was the only educational center for the village and those surrounding it. The school still provides education to some of the nearby communities and has an enrollment of 110 students. The regional government has recently proposed closing the Primary School due to its state of disrepair. If the government goes through with its plans, students will face a lack of education due to the distance of the other public school, and 25 teachers and 10 staff will become unemployed.

The "Secondary School of Lichk After Hovhannes Tumanyan" operates as the public education facility that serves the other half of the village. It was constructed in 1981 and has 750 students enrolled at the school.

== Artesian Well Controversy ==
On August 7, 2013 a spring that had supplied mineral water for the village of Lichk (Armenian: Թթու ջուր; meaning sour water) was demolished without the consent of the villagers. The artesian well had been drilled approximately 40 years ago by Soviet engineers, and was used by village residents since then. Many had used the naturally carbonated spring daily as a main source of drinking water or in hopes of curing certain ailments. A contract was secured through the local government by a businessman to construct a bottling plant at the site to produce soft drinks. Construction began in early-August and the dome of the spring, created by the mineral content of the water, was destroyed. Residents protested the move made by the local government and took back control of their water source. Restoration efforts were soon underway so that residents could once again use the source of water again. On June 12, 2015 the artesian well was uncapped through the efforts of residents in Lichk and is once again open for use.

== Gallery ==
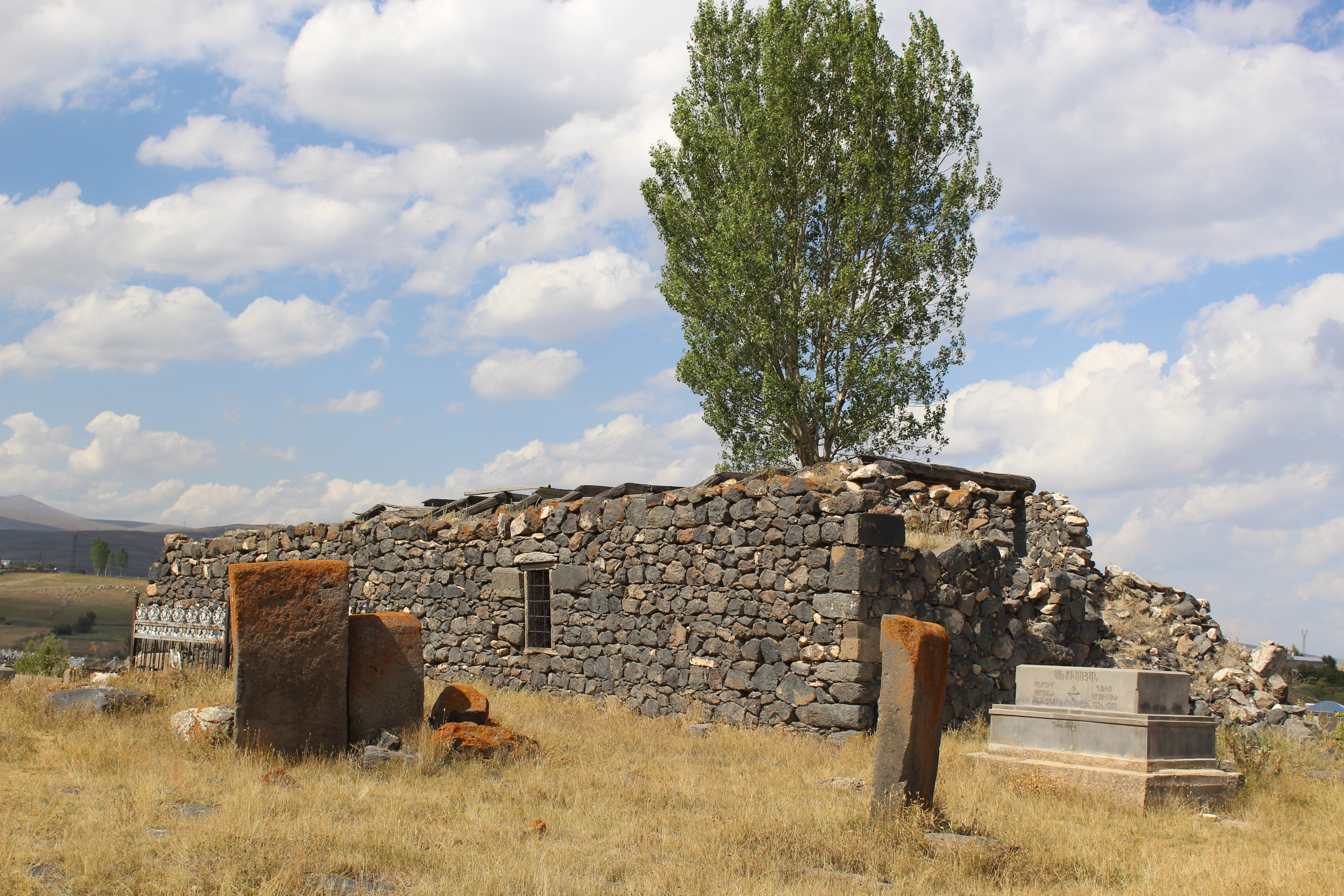
St. Astvatsatsin Church at the hilltop cemetery

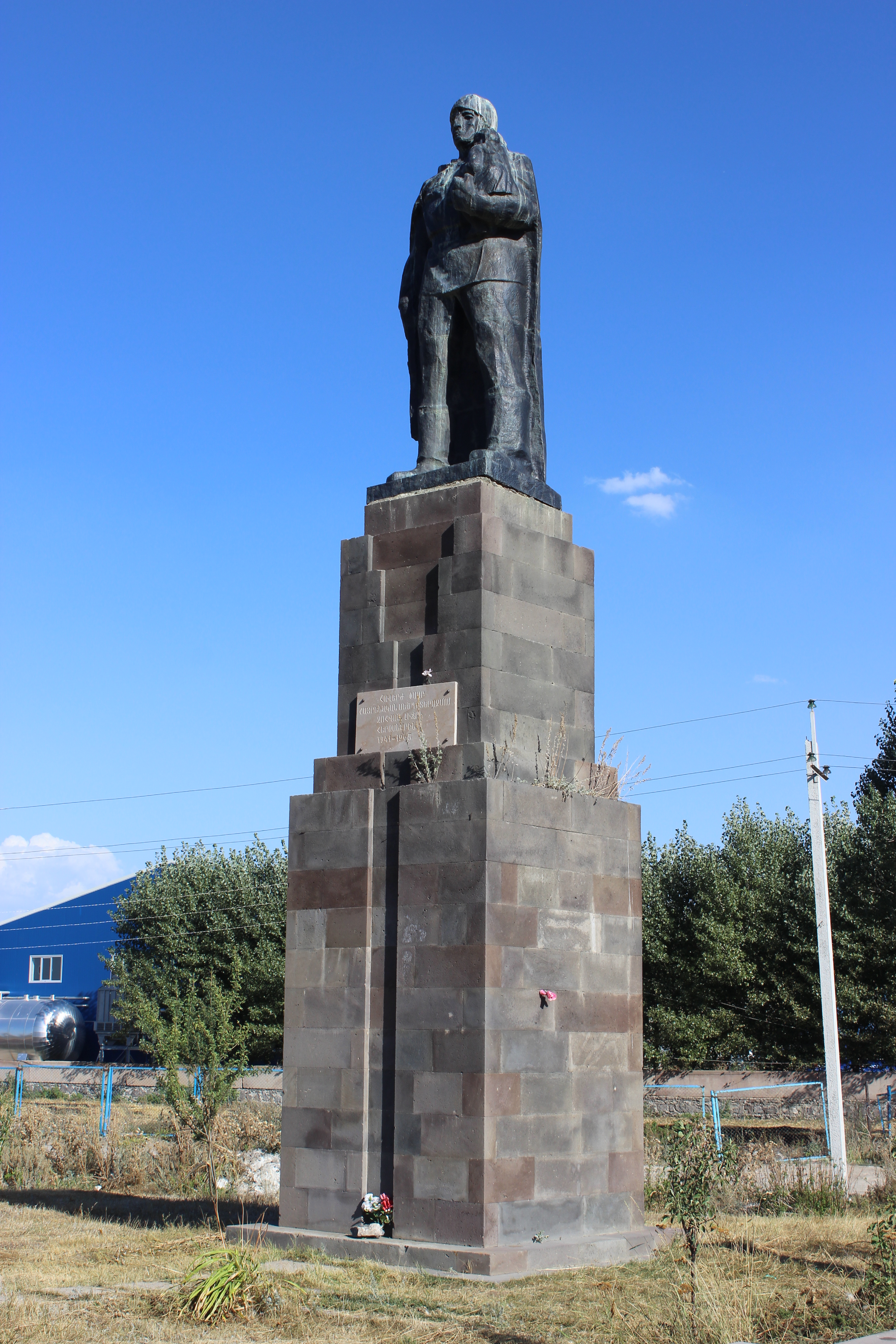
World War II Unknown Soldier Monument

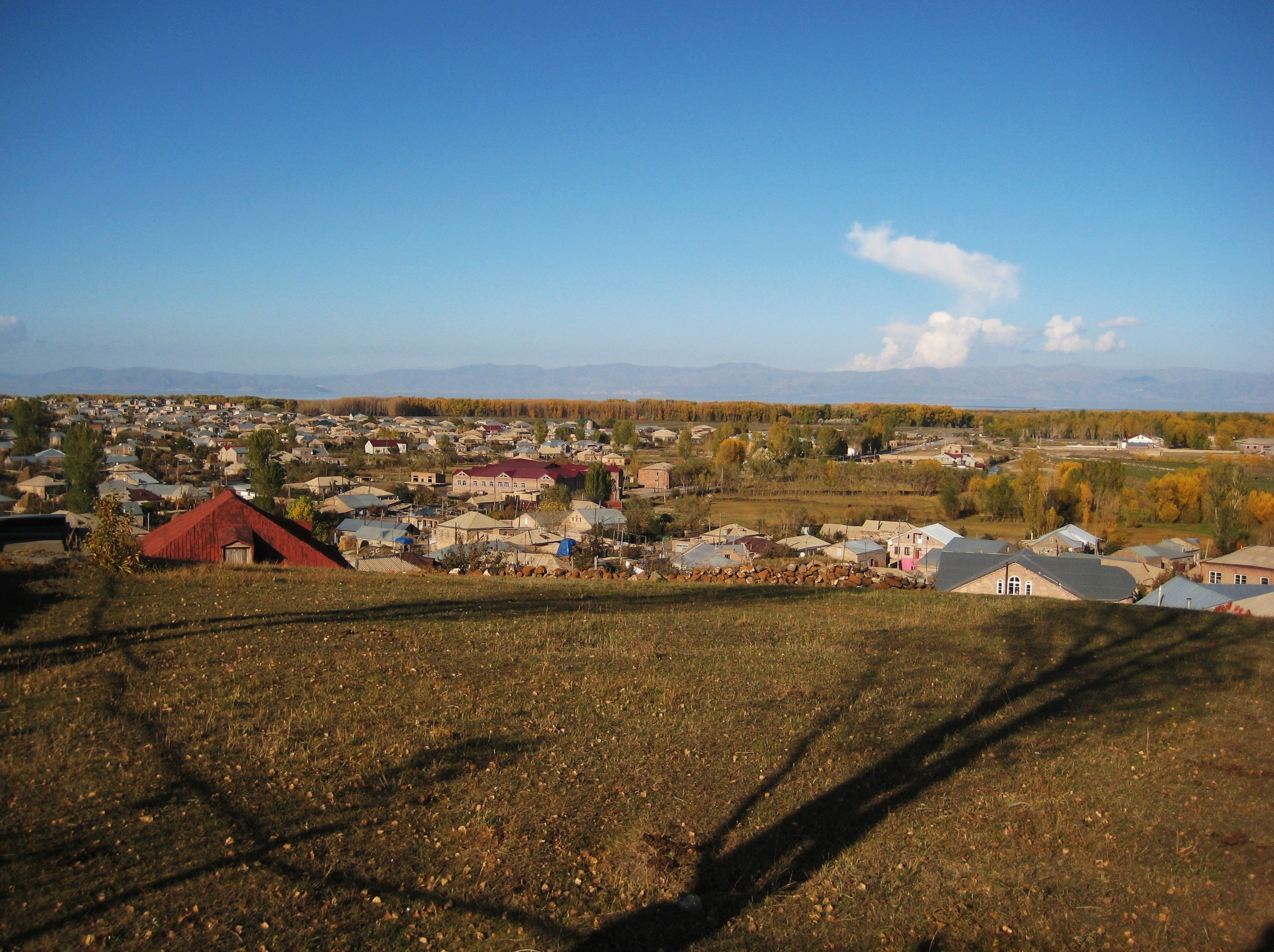
Lichk as seen from the church and cemetery

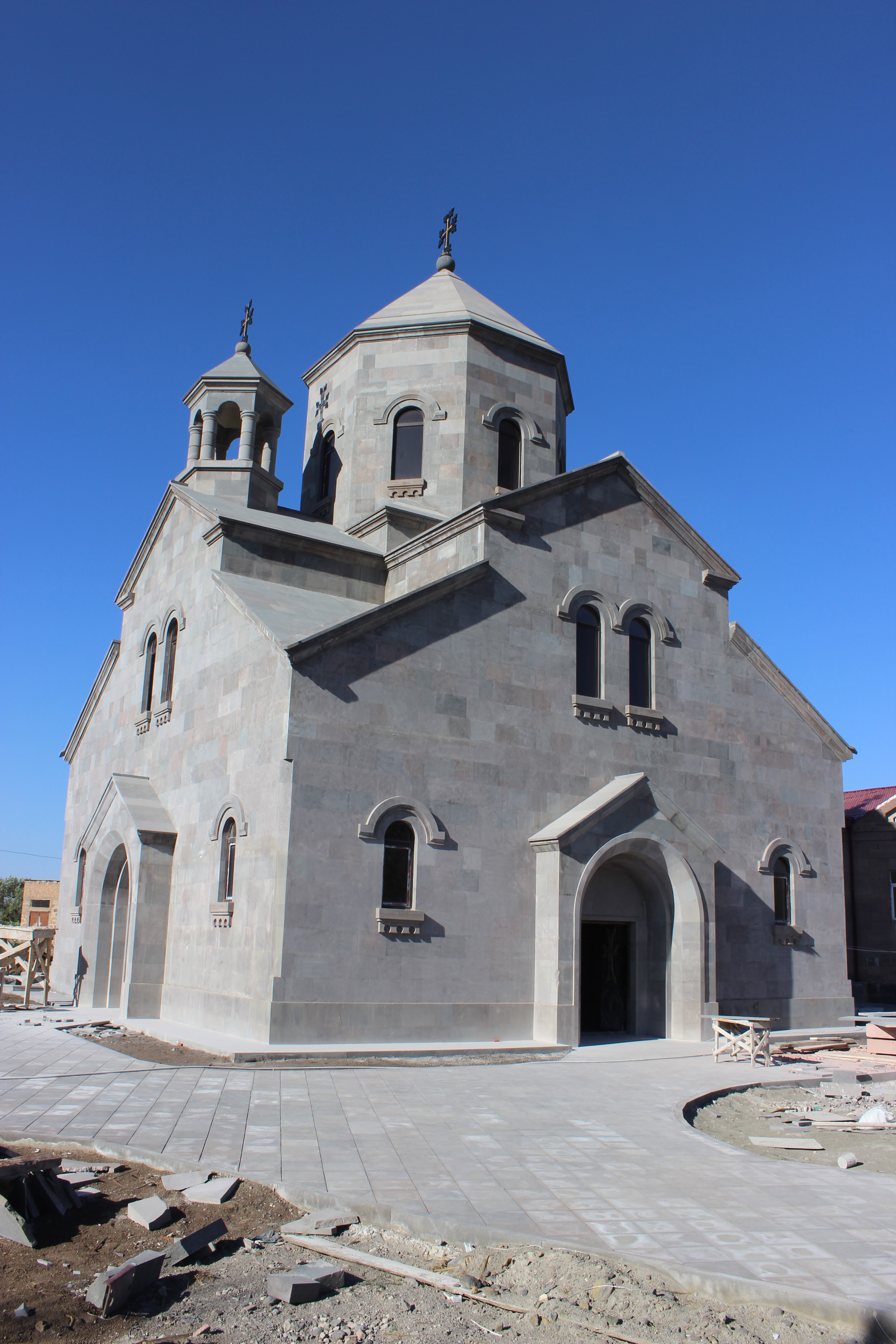
New church under construction, September 2014

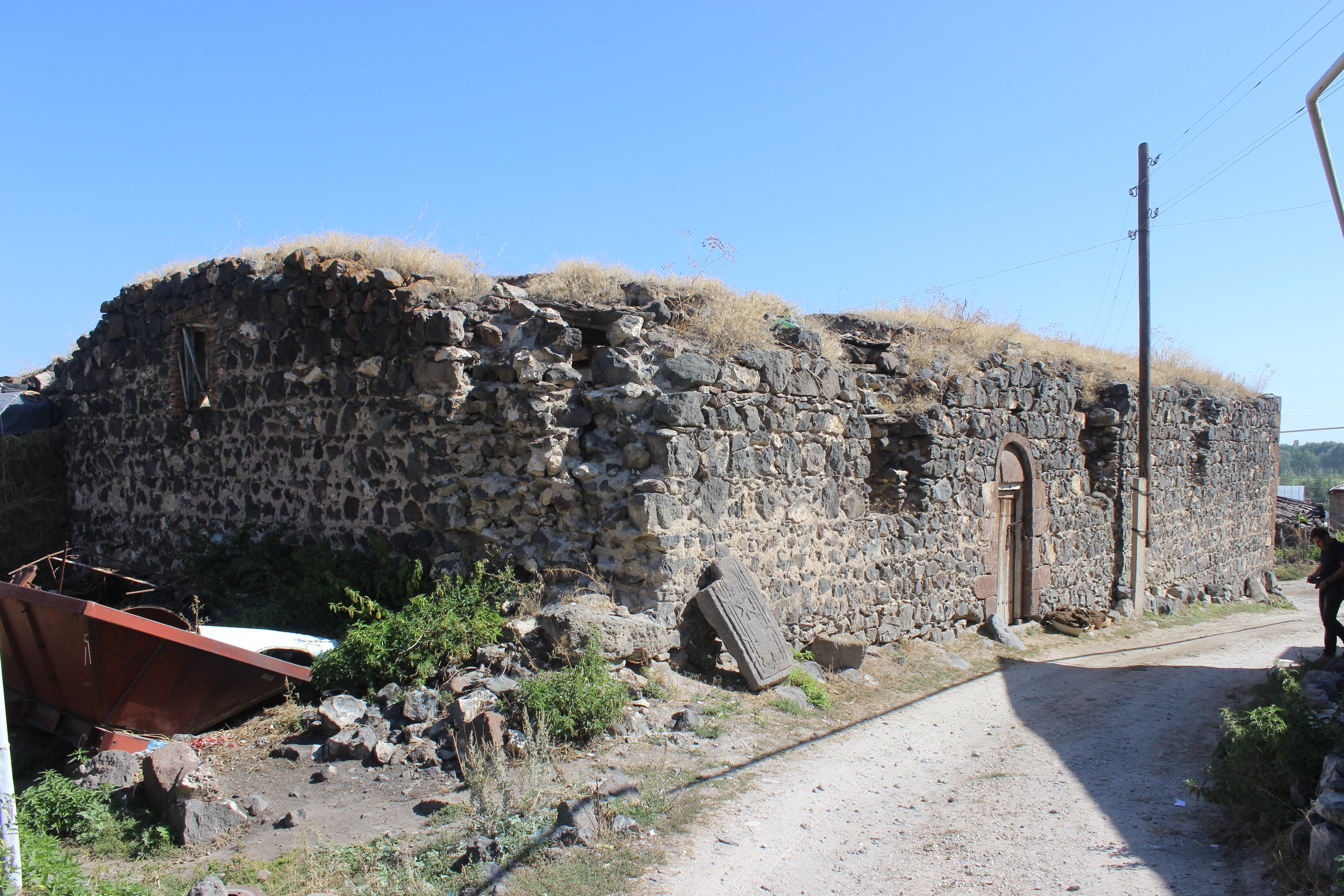
Church ruin, 1872

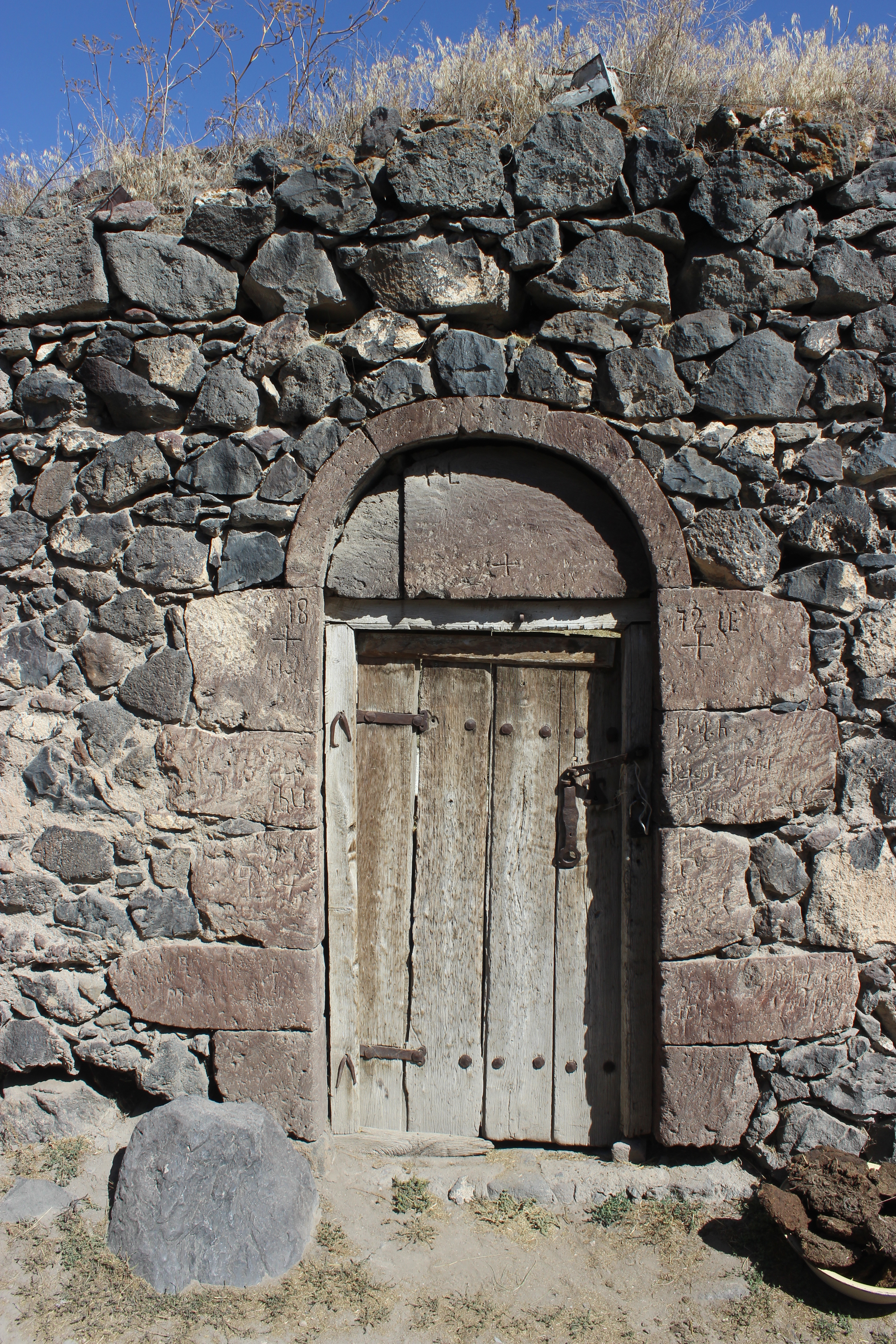
Church ruin door, with date 1872

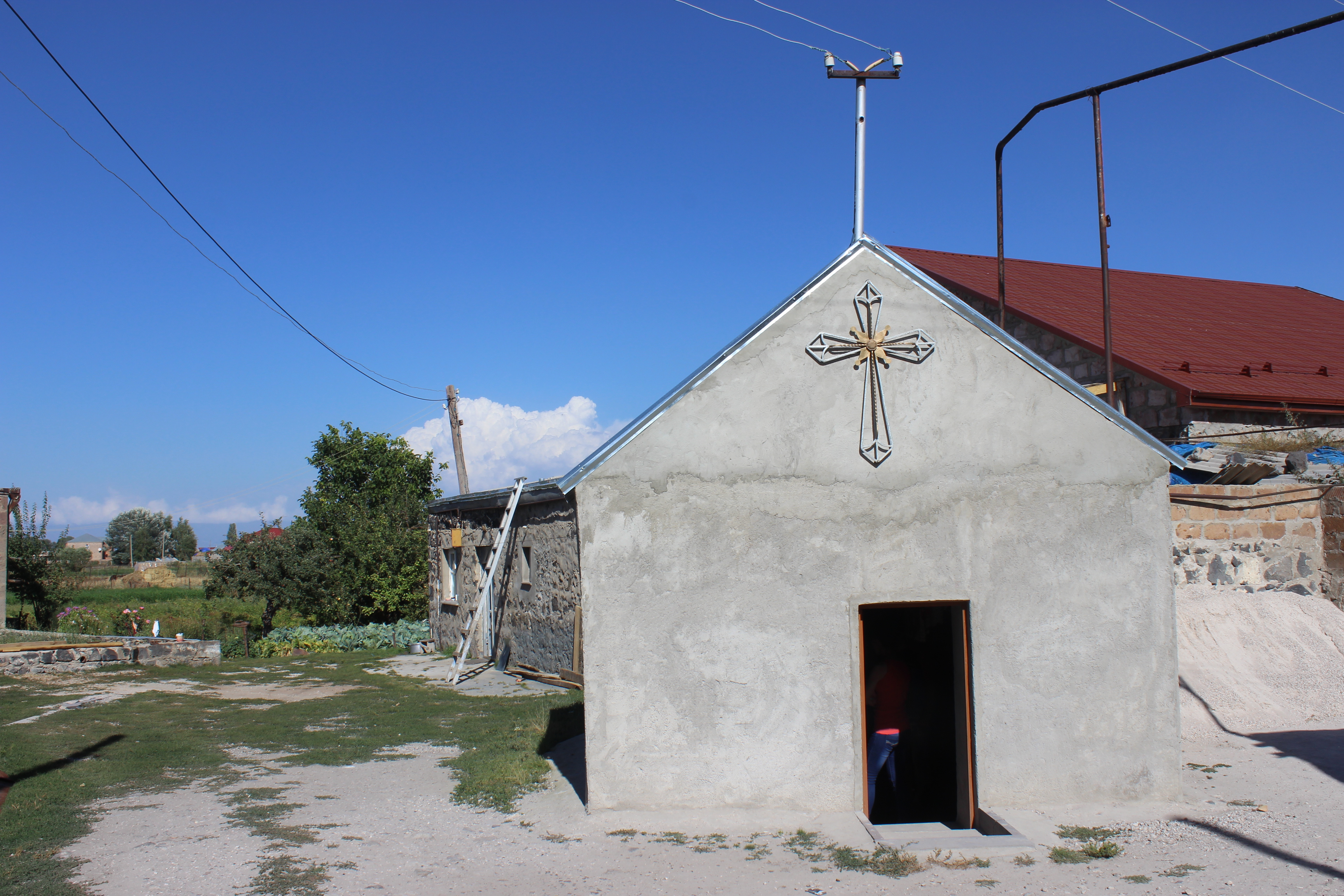
Tukh Manuk ("Dark Child") shrine

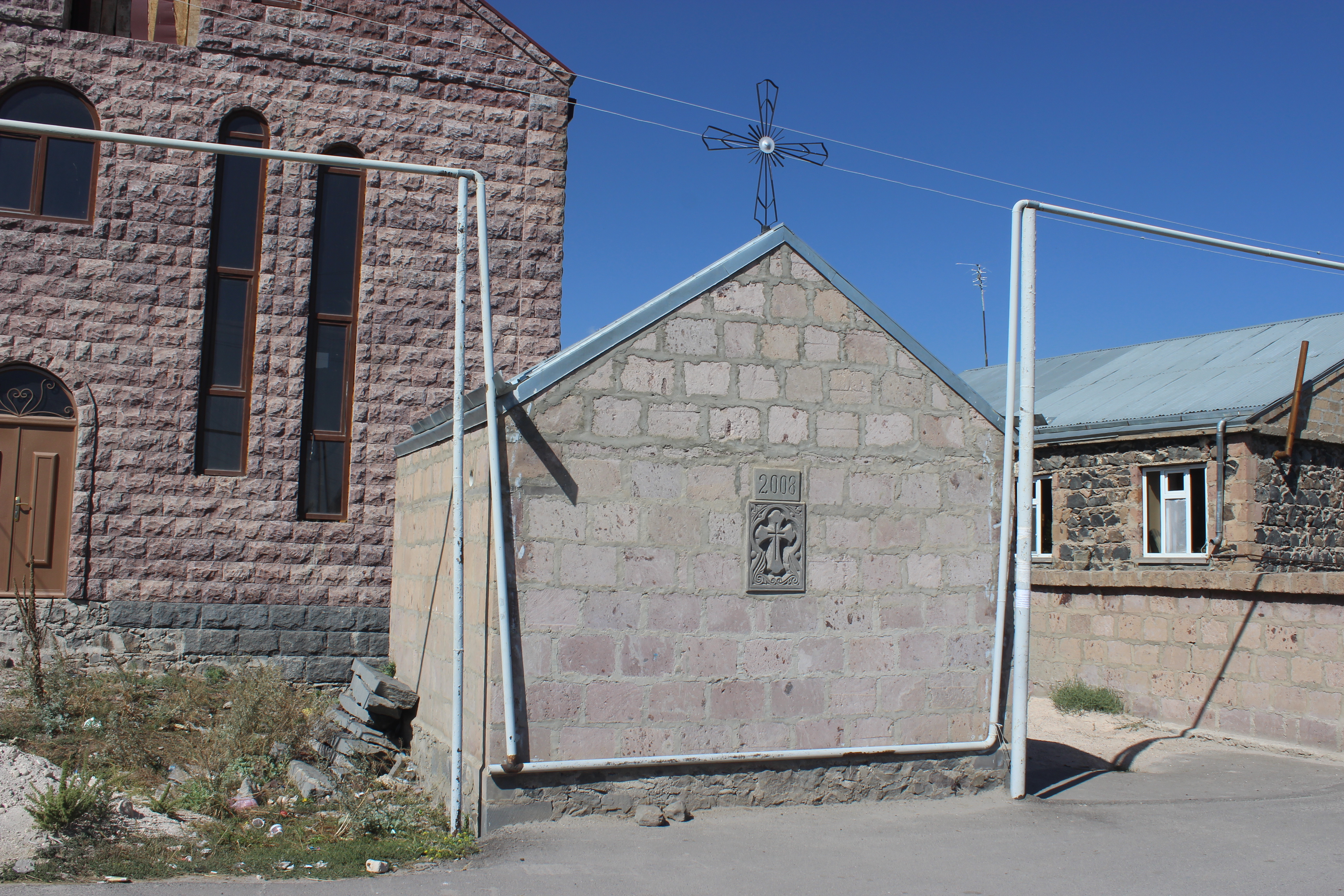
A newly constructed chapel, 2008
