= David Jelley =

Australian politician

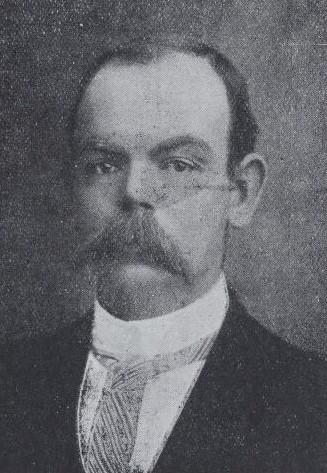
- Born: about 1871; United States
- Died: 27 January 1907 (aged 35–36); Alberton, South Australia
- Resting place: Cheltenham Cemetery
- Occupations: Iron moulder, union official
- Spouse: Elizabeth Fee
- Parent(s): John and Elizabeth Stevenson Jelley
- Relatives: James Jelley (brother)

Member for Central District in the South Australian Legislative Council
- In office August 1906 — 7 January 1907
- Preceded by: Henry William Thompson

David Jelley MLC. (ca.1871 – 27 January 1907) was a South Australian trades unionist who had a promising career in politics but died in office after one sitting. He was an older brother of James Jelley MLC.

== History ==
Jelley was the second of four children of John Jelley (ca.1847 – 6 June 1912), boring inspector, and Mrs. Elizabeth Stevenson Jelley (ca.1849 – 31 March 1929) who migrated to South Australia from Scotland around 1879, living initially in Wallaroo, then Port Adelaide, finally settling around 1884 at Stanley Street, Woodville.

Jelley was born in America during a visit by his parents, who returned to their native Scotland shortly after. They emigrated to South Australia around 1879 and David attended LeFevre's Peninsula and Port Adelaide State Schools for two years, and the Goodwood State School for five years. At the age of 13 the family moved to Woodville.

Jelley served an apprenticeship as ironmoulder with R. Lindsay at Port Adelaide, worked on Government bores south-west of Oodnadatta for three years. He then worked at Fulton & Co.'s foundry at Kilkenny for another three, then was for seven years at Adelaide Steamship Company's Port Adelaide workshops.

== Politics ==
He joined the Ironmoulders' Trades Society at 20 years of age, but it wasn't until around 1899 that he became a union official. He represented that union on the Trades and Labour Council, and was elected its President for one term. He also represented the Ironmoulders' Society on the Council of the United Labour Party for four years, and for over two years was on the executive council, and was President at the time of his death.

In August 1906, as the Labor nominee, he won the Central district seat on the Legislative Council made vacant by the death of Henry William Thompson.

He died in 1907 from internal hemorrhage which followed a bout of gastric influenza. He had only attended the short December session of Parliament, but had shown great promise as a practical legislator.

== Family ==
John Jelley (ca.1847 – 6 June 1912) and Mrs. Elizabeth Stevenson Jelley (ca.1849 – 31 March 1929) had five children:

- Eldest son Hugh ( – 21 March 1920)
- Second son David Jelley (ca.1871 – 27 January 1907) married Elizabeth "Lizzie" Fee on 2 December 1896, resided at Sheridan Road, Woodville North, left a widow and three children, the fourth, a daughter, was born 13 April 1907
- Third son James Jelley (18 October 1873 – 4 March 1954) was born in Scotland in 1873, and after arriving with his parents in South Australia in 1879 attended Lefevre Peninsula, Port Adelaide and Woodville Public Schools. He served an apprenticeship as a cabinetmaker and joined the SA branch of the Furniture Trade Society of Australasia. He was elected to the Legislative Council in 1912 and retired in 1933 after serving in the Gunn and second Hill ministries. He married Alice Maud Whitwell (died 3 March 1967) on 11 February 1902, lived at 35 Park Terrace, Eastwood. See main article
- Daughter Jeannie (ca.1877 – 27 January 1917) born at Patna, Scotland, married Mark E. H. Ridgway on 21 April 1903
- Fourth son John Andrew Jelley (4 July 1992 – 27 December 1949) married Harriett Brown on 28 June 1897. In 1924, he was charged with the murder of Michael Joseph Ryan at Strathalbyn, but was acquitted.
