= Geld (surname) =

Geld is a surname literally meaning "gold" or "money" in some Germanic languages. Notable people with the surname include:

- Gary Geld (born 1935), American composer
- Karyl Geld Miller, American screenwriter, political cartoonist, and commentator

== See also ==
- Gelt (disambiguation)
