= James Jelley =

Australian politician and trade unionist

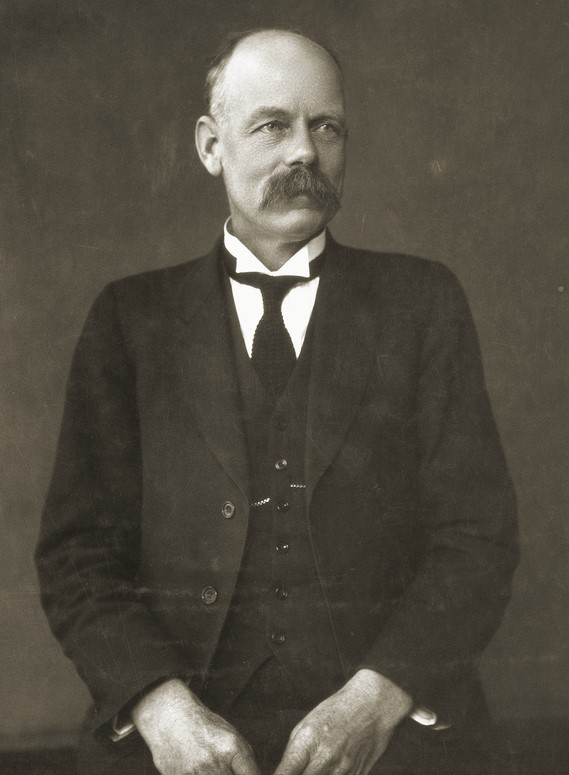
Jelley in 1925

James Jelley (18 October 1873 – 4 March 1954) was an Australian politician and trade unionist. He was a Labor member of the South Australian Legislative Council from 1912 to 1933, representing Central District (1912–1915) and Central District No. 1 (1915–1933).

He served as Chief Secretary in three Labor governments: John Gunn (1924–1926) and Lionel Hill (1926–1927 and 1930). He was also Minister for Railways under Gunn (1924–1925), and Minister of Marine (1930), Minister of Local Government, Minister of Immigration, Minister of Repatriation and Minister of Immigration under Hill (1930–1933).

He was one of the members of the Hill cabinet expelled in the 1931 Labor split, continuing in minority government as part of the splinter Parliamentary Labor Party, but retired in protest in 1933 following Hill's decision to appoint himself Agent-General in London. He was the younger brother of Labor MLC David Jelley.

== History ==
James were one of four children of John Jelley (ca.1847 – 6 June 1912), boring inspector, and Mrs. Elizabeth Stevenson Jelley (ca.1849 – 31 March 1929) who migrated to South Australia from Scotland around 1879, living initially in Wallaroo, then Port Adelaide, finally settling around 1884 at Stanley Street, Woodville. James was born in Scotland in 1873, and after arriving with his parents in South Australia in 1879 attended Lefevre Peninsula, Port Adelaide and Woodville Public Schools. He served an apprenticeship as a cabinetmaker and joined SA branch of the Furniture Trade Society of Australasia.

=== Politics ===
James was elected to the Woodville Council in 1909 and served until 1911. He had joined the Labor Party at the age of 19, and was to become president of the Eight Hours Union and president of the Woodville branch of the party. He was selected to contest the Australian House of Representatives seat of Boothby in 1911 but was unsuccessful. He was elected to the Legislative Council in 1912 on one of the Central district seats, and held the seat for 21 years. He served on the Cabinets of two Labor administrations: as Minister for Railways (1924–1925) and Chief Secretary (1924–1926) during the Gunn ministry, then Chief Secretary (1926–1930) and Minister of Local Government, Immigration, Repatriation and Irrigation (1930–1933) in the second Hill ministry. He resigned from Cabinet in 1933 in protest at the appointment of the Premier, Lionel Hill, as Agent-General in London. He retired from parliament in 1933, and the same year was appointed chairman of the Betting Control Board, holding the post until 1939. He continued as a member of the BCB until December 1953, when failing health forced his resignation. He was buried privately, his family having refused the Government's offer of a State funeral.

== Family ==
His parents John Jelley (ca.1847 – 6 June 1912) and Elizabeth Stevenson Jelley (ca.1849 – 31 March 1929) had five children:

- eldest son Hugh Jelley ( – 21 March 1920)
- David Jelley (ca.1871 – 27 January 1907) migrated with his parents from Scotland to South Australia and attended LeFevre's Peninsula, Port Adelaide and Goodwood State schools and served an apprenticeship as ironmoulder. He joined the Ironmoulders' Trades Society and won the Central district seat on the Legislative Council. He died after only attending one session of Parliament. He married Elizabeth "Lizzie" Fee on 2 December 1896, resided at Sheridan Road, Woodville North, left a widow and three children, the fourth, a daughter, was born a few months later. See main article
- James Jelley (18 October 1873 – 4 March 1954) married Alice Maud Whitwell (died 3 March 1967) on 11 February 1902, lived at 35 Park Terrace, Eastwood.
- Jeannie Jelley (ca.1877 – 27 January 1917) born at Patna, Scotland, married Mark E. H. Ridgway on 21 April 1903
- Fourth son John Andrew Jelley (4 July 1992 – 27 December 1949) married Harriett Brown on 28 June 1897. In 1924, he was charged with the murder of Michael Joseph Ryan at Strathalbyn, but was acquitted.
