= Buongiorno (company) =

Italian mobile services and software company

Buongiorno S.p.A.
- Company type: Subsidiary
- Industry: Mobile services; Software; Digital content
- Founded: 1999
- Founder: Mauro Del Rio
- Headquarters: Milan, Italy
- Area served: Worldwide
- Key people: Mauro Del Rio (chairman)
- Products: Mobile apps and services; Mobile personalisation and entertainment services; Digital marketing services
- Parent: NTT Docomo (since 2012)

Buongiorno was a company founded in 1999 that develops apps and services for mobile devices. It was acquired by NTT Docomo in 2012 and renamed Docomo Digital in 2017, with the Financial Times reporting of a possible sale in 2018. Docomo Digital was founded in 2016 utilising its acquisition net mobile and Buongiorno.

Following settlement of a public tender offer in 2012, Buongiorno became an owned subsidiary of NTT Docomo, a mobile telecommunications, technologies and service company. Through the provision of a diverse range of content and services, Buongiorno has served over two billion customers in 57 countries, spanning four continents. Their services include, among other things, mobile personalisation and entertainment, social networking, multimedia interactive services.

== History ==
Buongiorno started out in 1995 when current chairman Mauro Del Rio started sending humorous e-mail messages with the subject "Buongiorno" (Italian for "good day") to 11 friends. The business expanded quickly and by 1998 he was sending e-mail newsletters to 25,000 people. Del Rio launched Buongiorno SpA to provide services for the telecommunications market, beginning a policy of growth through international acquisitions, the first of which was of the Spanish company MyAlert in 2001. Buongiorno merged with Vitaminic in July 2003 to form Buongiorno Vitaminic SpA. The company continued with its policy of acquisitions, the most significant of which were the Italian company Gsmbox in 2004, and the French company Freever leading in mobile communities and created by Jerome Trainel, Philippe Tissot, and Pierre Duhau-Laurent in 2005.

On March 25, 2006, the company changed its name to Buongiorno SpA.

More recent acquisitions which led to the current structure of the Buongiorno group were the British firm Inventa which was purchased at the end of 2006 and the American company Rocket Mobile in the early months of 2007. A significant partnership was established with the Mitsui corporation of Japan, creating the joint venture Buongiorno Hong Kong, managed by Simone Ranucci Brandimarte. The partnership's first major transaction was the acquisition of eDong Asia, a Chinese provider of mobile content. On June 11, 2010, the company announced its investment in Glamoo, company leader in the group buying ("collective buying") sector and headquartered in London. In July 2012, Japan's NTT Docomo took over Buongiorno in a deal worth 209 million euros.

== Financial information ==
As reported on the balance sheet dated 31 December 2006, the Buongiorno group has a consolidated investment of about €157.2 million, with a net worth of around €76.9 million, a consolidated turnover of about €191.8 million and consolidated net profit of about €12.6 million.

Investment in the parent company amounts to approximately €124.2 million, with a net worth of around €76.9 million, a turnover of about €50.5 million and a net profit of about €13.8 million, with extraordinary income (capital gains on sale of shares) of about 10.9 million euros.

In 2006 the Buongiorno group employed on average 659 employees, including 173 staff in the parent company.

== Controversy ==
In August 2012, Buongiorno featured in a BBC News Technology article exposing a loophole in the company's systems which allowed experienced hackers to sign up any mobile number to Buongiorno's subscription services, regardless of the mobile number's owner consent or knowledge. Buongiorno said it quickly closed the loophole once it was discovered and had no evidence it had been exploited.
