= Gelt Lake =

Lago Gelt
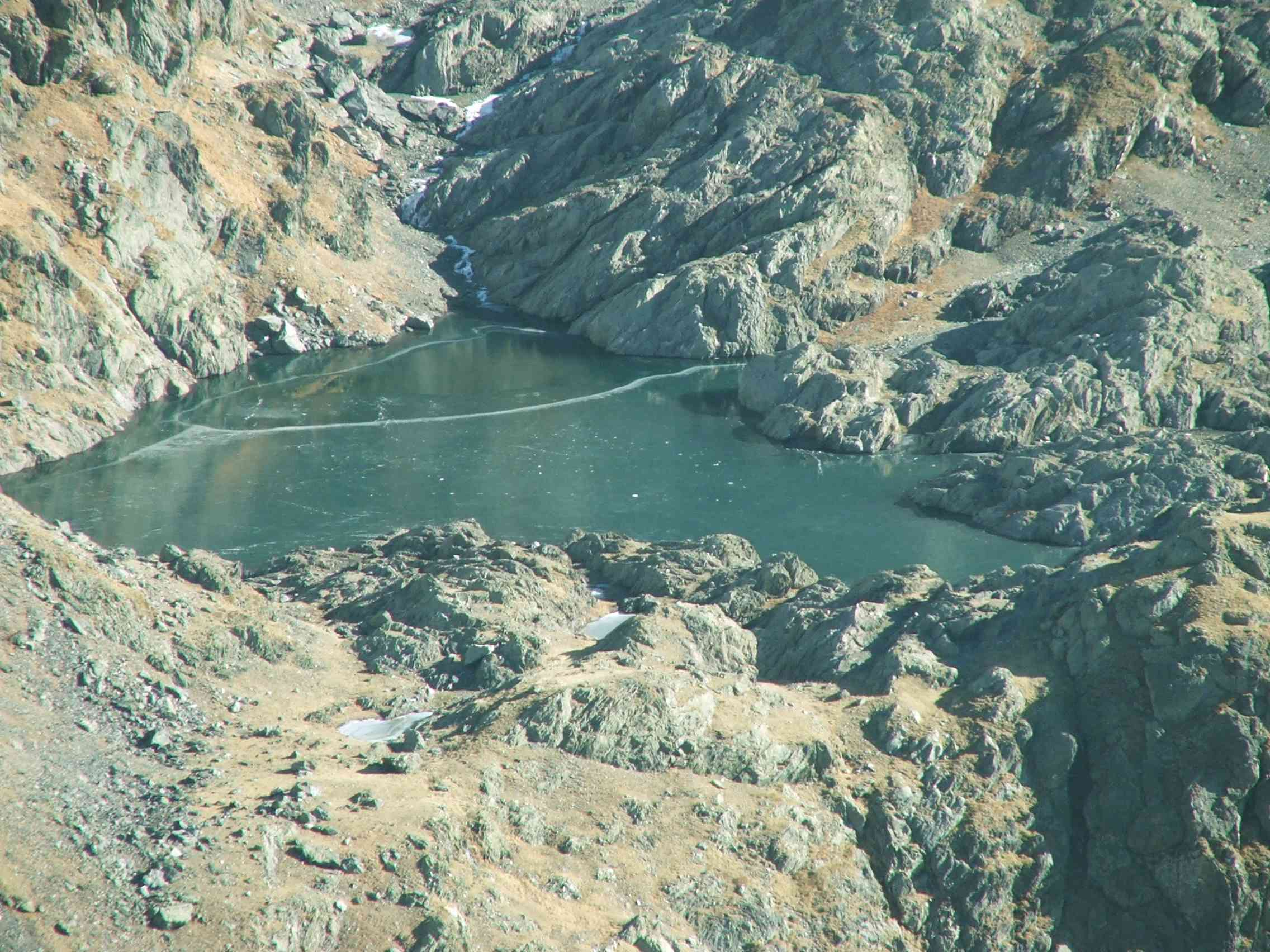

- Location within Lombardy
- Location: Province of Bergamo, Lombardy
- Coordinates: 46°05′12″N 10°04′05″E
- Type: Natural freshwater lake
- Basin countries: Italy
- Max. length: 190 metres (620 ft)
- Max. width: 155 metres (509 ft)
- Surface elevation: 2,562 m (8,406 ft)

Gelt Lake is a lake in the Province of Bergamo, Lombardy, Italy.

== Gallery ==
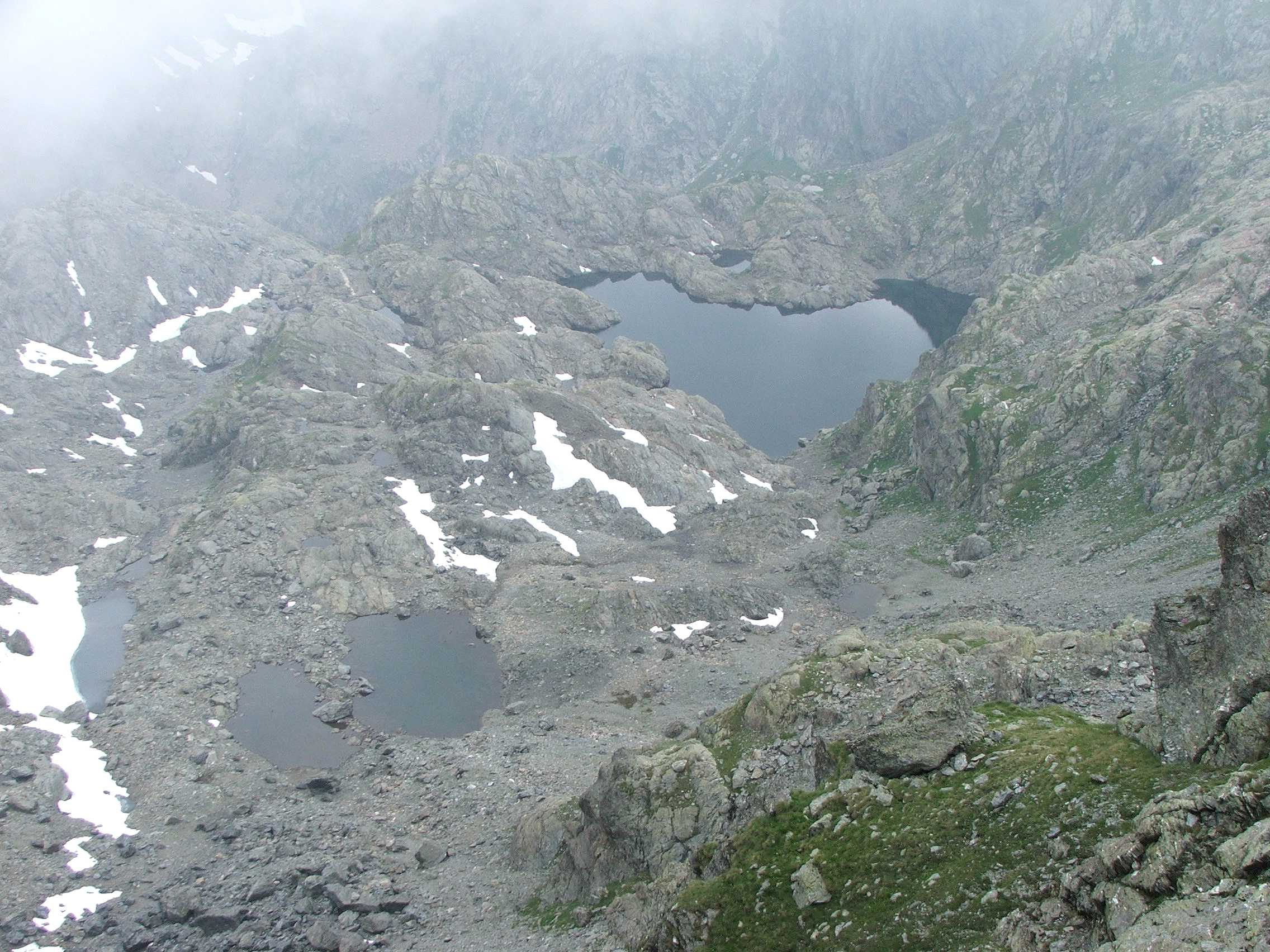
Gelt Lake as seen from the Gelt Mouth

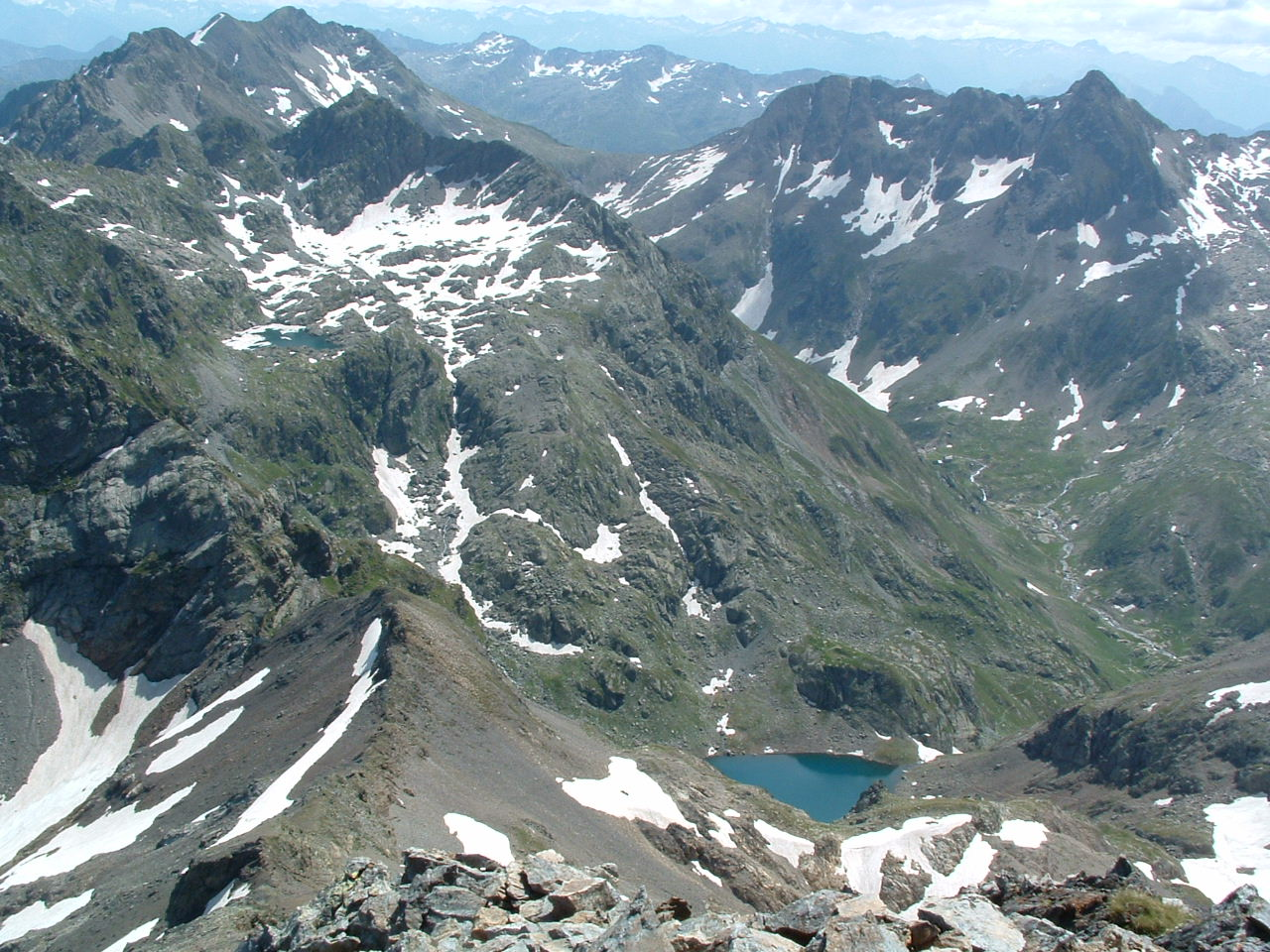
View from Malgina Devil's Lace of Malgina Lake (bottom) and Gelt Lake (top)
