= Average revenue per user =

Measure in consumer communications

Average revenue per user (ARPU), sometimes known as average revenue per unit, is a measure used primarily by consumer communications, digital media, and networking companies, defined as the total revenue divided by the number of subscribers.

The term is used by companies that offer subscription services to clients for example, telephone carriers, Internet service providers, and hosts. It is a measure of the revenue generated by one customer phone, pager, etc., per unit time, typically per year or month. In mobile telephony, ARPU includes not only the revenues billed to the customer each month for usage but also the revenue generated from incoming calls, payable within the regulatory interconnection regime.

Digital media and social media companies, which often rely on advertising revenue generated by users with free accounts, pay particularly close attention to their ARPU. Variations in ARPU reflect changes in the companies' ability to generate revenue and heavily impact their stock prices. That provides the company a granular view at a per user or unit basis and allows it to track revenue sources and growth. ARPU is also used in the video game industry for games that support microtransactions or are offered as games as a service, as similarly, the bulk of revenue in such games comes from a small percentage of the overall population.

There is a trend by telecommunications and Internet companies and their suppliers to sell extra services to users and a lot of the promotion that is used by the companies talks of increased ARPU for the operators. It typically manifests in the form of value-added services such as entertainment being sold to customers especially in markets where the primary service offered to the customer, such as the telephony or Internet service, is sold at a commodity rate.

== Calculation ==
To calculate ARPU, a standard time period must be defined. Most telecommunications carriers operate by the month. The total revenue generated by all units (paying subscribers or communications devices) during that period is determined. Then that figure is divided by the number of units. Because the number of units can vary from day to day, the average number of units must be calculated or estimated for a given month to obtain the most accurate possible ARPU figure for that month.

Also related is the ARPPU (Average Revenue Per Paying User), which is calculated by dividing up the revenue amongst the users who paid anything at all. That yields a figure that is significantly larger than ARPU. For example, in the case of a subscription game that has a free to play version, the ARPPU, measured by accounts, is the subscription price, diluted slightly by free trials.

A related measure is the ARPDAU (Average Revenue Per Daily Active User). Other common measure is ARPC (Average Revenue Per Customer), some customers generate higher revenue than other because these customer contract more telecommunications services or generate more use than other customers and so these customer have a higher ARPC, than others customers for the same telecommunication company.

Average margin per user (AMPU) is another criterion for measuring the success of telephone companies. The central premise is that by attention to the margin produced per sold unit, not the amount of cash (revenue) earned from each customer, one can afford low volumes and still have a healthy company. High volumes can also bring a significant edge until competition forces prices down. Telecom analysts is traditionally highly focused on ARPU because the typical telco has had huge infrastructure costs that needs to be serviced by a considerable ARPU. Another use of "AMPU" in some telephone companies (in particular Telenor) is Average Minutes Per User, meaning the amount of time (measured in minutes) the average subscriber talks (or listens) in their phones. That is also called Minutes-Of-Use or MOU.

ARPU is widely used by Internet Protocol television (IPTV) service providers.

== See also ==
- Application enablement
- Mobile phone
