= Gelt River (New Zealand) =

Coordinates: 42°31′15″S 173°18′00″E

Location
- Country: New Zealand

Physical characteristics
- Source
  - location: Black Hills
- Mouth
  - location: Conway River
  - elevation: 218 m (715 ft)
- Basin size: 16.5 km^{2} (6.4 sq mi)

The Gelt River is a river in the Canterbury region of New Zealand. It arises near Mount Peter in the Black Hills and flows south, then east and north-east into Conway River.

The river has a catchment area of 1,650 hectares (4,100 acres).

== See also ==
- List of rivers of New Zealand
