= Joint Innovation Lab =

The Joint Innovation Lab (JIL) is a joint venture in mobile communications. It was established in 2009 as a partnership between Vodafone, Verizon Wireless, China Mobile and SoftBank Mobile. It is backed up by handset makers LG Electronics, Research In Motion, Samsung Electronics and Sharp Corporation.

The companies use the JIL as a platform to develop mobile services. JIL's first project is to develop a mobile widget ecosystem that will allow developers to benefits from access to the combined customer base of the four JIL mobile operators.

== Wholesale Applications Community ==
The Wholesale Applications Community was formed by a group of 24 mobile network operators and announced at Mobile World Congress 2010 in Barcelona with the remit to tackle device fragmentation through the introduction of ‘open standard’ web technologies.

Over the following year, more and more companies expressed a commitment to the common cause and WAC now has over 60 members in its ranks, including handset manufacturers, software development companies and mobile network operators from all over the world.

In September 2010, just six months after the initial announcement, the first WAC 1.0 mobile web run time specification was released, signalling the organisation’s intent to support developers with an open web-based platform that could run applications across multiple devices and operating systems.

With the support of its 40+ members, WAC appointed former Vodafone executive Peters Suh as CEO, with Michel Combes and Jean Philippe Vanot taking on the roles of Chairman and Deputy Chair. The news that the GSMA’s OneAPI would be the standard adopted by WAC’s network operator members for the exposure of network APIs was followed by a further nine new members joining the organisation, including new OEMs, swelling the membership to over 50 companies.

By Mobile World Congress 2011, WAC formally confirmed its status as a ‘not for profit’ organisation and announced that its membership had now grown to more than 60 full members.
