= Jell =

Jell may refer to:

- Gel, an apparently solid, jelly-like material
- Gelatin dessert, also known as jelly, a sweet or savoury food gel
