= IntelePeer =

- Type: Private
- Industry: Telecommunications
- Founded: 2003
- Headquarters: Dania Beach, FL
- Key people: Frank Fawzi, President, CEO and Chairman of the Board; Matt Edic, Chief eXperience Officer; Tom Conway, Chief Financial Officer
- Number of employees: 300
- Website: http://www.intelepeer.com

IntelePeer is a privately held company based in Dania Beach, Florida and is a Communications Automation Platform (CAP) provider of voice, messaging, automation, applications, APIs, and analytics for enterprises.

The company is backed by venture capital firms VantagePoint Venture Partners, Kennet Partners, NorthCap Partners and EDF Ventures.

== Corporate history ==
IntelePeer was founded as VoEX, Inc. in 2003 to provide core network VoIP services to large communications services providers, universities, large enterprises and VoIP applications developers. The company was originally based in Grand Rapids, Michigan.

In July 2006, the company completed a series B funding round for $12 million led by Kennet Partners.

In September 2006, the company moved its global headquarters to Foster City, California.

VoEX changed its name to IntelePeer, Inc. in September 2007.

In November 2008, IntelePeer completed a series C round of financing for $18 million. The financing was led by new investor VantagePoint Venture Partners of San Bruno, California, with participation by existing investors.

In May 2011 the company initially filed to go public. In January 2012 the company withdrew its request to go public and remains private at this time.

In October 2015 IntelePeer acquired Advantone, a cloud contact center company based in Plantation, Florida. IntelePeer added Advantone's contact center suite to its product line, creating the Atmosphere cloud communications platform.

In 2021, IntelePeer expanded to Dania, Florida, at the Design Center of the Americas. In March of the same year, IntelePeer and Enghouse Interactive partnered to create a COVID-19 vaccine hotline scheduling solution with geographic routing capabilities for rural households to schedule appointments via the Internet. Also in 2021, IntelePeer obtained STIR/SHAKEN certification, applying it to all voice traffic originating from its network, including via SIP or Atmosphere CPaaS platform.

In 2022, IntelePeer achieved Service Organization Control (SOC) 2 certification. During the company's 2022 Digital Transformation 4.0 & Beyond presentation at Colombia's Universidad de Los Andes, it announced the first annual DevSavant Academy Scholarship winner.

In September 2022, IntelePeer partnered with Microsoft Teams' Operator Connect program, integrating MS Team in IntelePeer services. Also in 2022, IntelePeer collaborated with BASE Technology to train program participants in low- and no-code technology skills.

== Services ==
In October 2006, the company introduced its SuperRegistry, which combines interconnection call signaling and media translation, and ENUM Telephone number mapping registry capabilities to allow peering partners who participated in the SuperRegistry to complete calls with each other through direct digital connections to reduce long distance and international call expenses for customers.

In September 2008, IntelePeer launched its AppWorx communications-enabling application development environment offering an application programming interface (API) to help service providers and application developers voice-enable applications.

In October 2009, IntelePeer joined the Microsoft Partner Program to integrate its platform with Windows Live applications.

In 2016, IntelePeer announced its partnership with Cisco to become the first PSTN provider for Cisco's Spark and Meraki products.

In March 2018, IntelePeer moved to multi-channel communications with its launch of Atmosphere Messaging, which enables companies to configure their business phone lines to send and receive SMS messages. In October 2018, IntelePeer launched a new partner portal designed to help channel partners develop and nurture Communications Platform as a Service (CPaaS) business opportunities.

In December 2018, IntelePeer launched two additions to its Communications Platform, Atmosphere SmartFlows and Atmosphere Engage. Soon after the launch of Atmosphere SmartFlows and Atmosphere Engage, IntelePeer released Atmosphere Insights in January 2019, an AI-enabled analytics platform to deliver real-time reporting in one location.

In June 2019, IntelePeer made Atmosphere Social Messaging available across social media and other messaging channels. IntelePeer launched Atmosphere Messaging for Facebook in November of that same year. At the time, the launch marked IntelePeer as the only CPaaS provider to support Facebook Messenger with open APIs and a workflow automation solution.

During the COVID-19 pandemic, IntelePeer launched the Small Business Recovery Program in June 2020. Meant to assist small businesses across the country as they reopened after restrictions and closures, the program offered credit toward SMS services to those with fewer than 50 employees. Eligible non-profits and companies could communicate with their customers about reopening policies, updated hours, promotions, etc.

In June 2020, IntelePeer made its Atmosphere Managed Solutions available to enterprise users. In October 2020, the company launched Atmosphere CPaaS Connectors for contact centers; the platform aids in the addition of cloud-delivered CX applications such as omni-channel automation, artificial intelligence (AI), and analytics into existing premise-based platforms from vendors, including Cisco and Avaya. 2020 also marked the year IntelePeer's Atmosphere CPaaS was awarded for HIPAA compliance, having met the requirements of applicable data protection regulations. Compliance with such platforms is considered a critical factor in maintaining data integrity and transparency, as it validates the organization's ability to safeguard protected health information (PHI) and foster trust with healthcare partners and regulators.

In June 2021, the company made its Atmosphere Voice offering available for Microsoft Teams. In July of the same year, the company launched its Channel Partner Advisory Council to discuss market trends, forecasts, customer insights, product development and marketing. In September 2021, IntelePeer announced that Atmosphere Voice was available as an add-on to IBM Watson Assistant Plus and Enterprise plans.

In November 2021, the company launched its Reputation Management solution to combat illegal robocalls and scams. That same month, IntelePeer launched Atmosphere Marketplace, an online store for pre-built applications. The release of Marketplace marked the industry's first accessible No-Code/Turnkey apps.

In April 2023, IntelePeer incorporated generative AI technologies into its SmartAgent digital solution for contact centers.
