= Group Exemption Letter =

A Group Exemption Letter or (GEL) is a special letter that is issued by the United States Internal Revenue Service (IRS). A GEL pertains to organizations that have been recognized by the IRS as tax exempt organizations.

Many organizations in the United States maintain a GEL and obtaining one can be of benefit to an organization.

== Overview ==
According to the IRS, a Group Exemption Letter is a ruling or determination letter that is issued to a central organization recognizing, on a group basis, the exemption from Federal income tax under 26 U.S.C. § 501(c) of subordinate organizations on whose behalf the central organization has applied for recognition of exemption.

To obtain a GEL, the central organization must have first applied for and received its own 501(c)(3) Exemption Determination Letter recognizing its 501(c)(3) Tax Exemption status. Once the central organization has received its determination letter and has at least one subordinate wishing to operate under its exemption, then it is time to file for the GEL.

Each year, the central organization submits a list of subordinate organizations to be included in the next year's GEL.

== Benefits ==
By obtaining a Group Exemption Letter, the central organization is able to pass along, to its subordinates, its tax exemption status, thus, making the subordinate organizations eligible to be claimed as a 501(c)(3) organization under the same status as the central organization. If the central organization is recognized as a 501(c)(3), then all the subordinates are also considered 501(c)(3), as long as they follow the required guidelines set by the central organization.

By being included in the Group Exemption Letter, the subordinates do not have to file an application for exemption, and can accept donations that are tax-deductible under the law. A major benefit is that a subordinate does not have to pay the fees to obtain an exemption letter.
