= Adam Lyons =

American entrepreneur

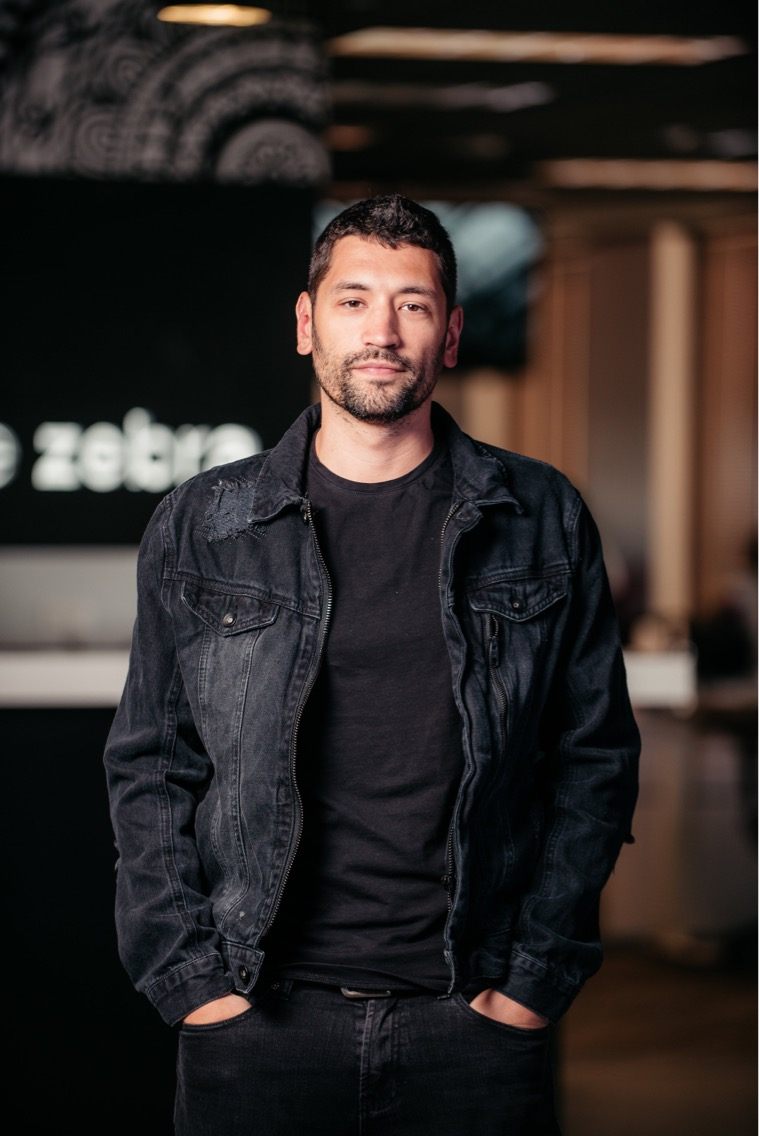
- Born: 20 June 1987 (age 39)
- Occupations: Founder, The Zebra
- Years active: 2012-present

Adam Lyons is an American entrepreneur. He founded The Zebra, an insurance comparison website and REALLY Wireless, a telecommunications company.

== Education ==
Lyons grew up in Pittsburgh, Pennsylvania, where he attended Taylor Allderdice High School. He dropped out of high school when he was 15 years old and had odd jobs until he became an insurance underwriter. Lyons was taking classes at a local community college when he was recruited by the Risk Management & Insurance Department at Temple University. He graduated from Temple University in 2009 with a Bachelor of Business Administration from the Fox School of Business.

== Career ==
Lyons worked in the insurance industry, starting at Lloyd's of London as a broker and underwriter. Later, he worked as an underwriter for All Risks Insurance, one of the largest US insurance wholesalers.

In 2012, Lyons founded The Zebra. Lyons began to look for investors for the new business venture and partnered with Mark Cuban, after pitching the startup over a cold email. Later, Cuban noted he liked the concept of The Zebra and commented on Lyons' succinct writing style. Adam also partnered with Mike Maples, Jr., an early investor in Twitter and Lyft of Floodgate Fund, UK billionaire Simon Nixon of Moneysupermarket.com. and Silverton Partners based in Austin, Texas. After securing $4.5 million in seed funding in 2013, Lyons relocated the company to Austin, TX.

In 2015, Lyons was named to Inc. Magazine's 30 Under 30 list. He was recognized as a finalist for the 2016 Ernst & Young Entrepreneur of the Year Award and also made Forbes 30 Under 30 list in 2017.

In 2018, Lyons left The Zebra to explore other ventures including the development of a reality TV show with the Pilgrim Media Group in Los Angeles.

In 2022, Lyons founded REALLY Wireless, a fully-encrypted and privacy focused wireless mobile network.
