= BillMonitor =

- Industry: Price comparison service
- Founded: 2007
- Website: www.billmonitor.com

BillMonitor is a UK-based mobile price comparison and switching website accredited by Ofcom, the independent regulator and competition authority for the UK communications industries.

Started in 2007, the site was developed by mathematicians and scientific advisers from Oxford University and analyses historical usage patterns to predict future usage.

Like its UK competitors, Mobile Phone Checker and moneysupermarket.com, the service recommends plans based on a user’s stated needs, in terms of minutes per month, texts, data and international use. The service also offers a monthly bill-tracking facility that allows users with online billing to give the site access to their past bills.
