= San Jacinto Center =

Skyscraper in Austin Texas

San Jacinto Center Town Lake
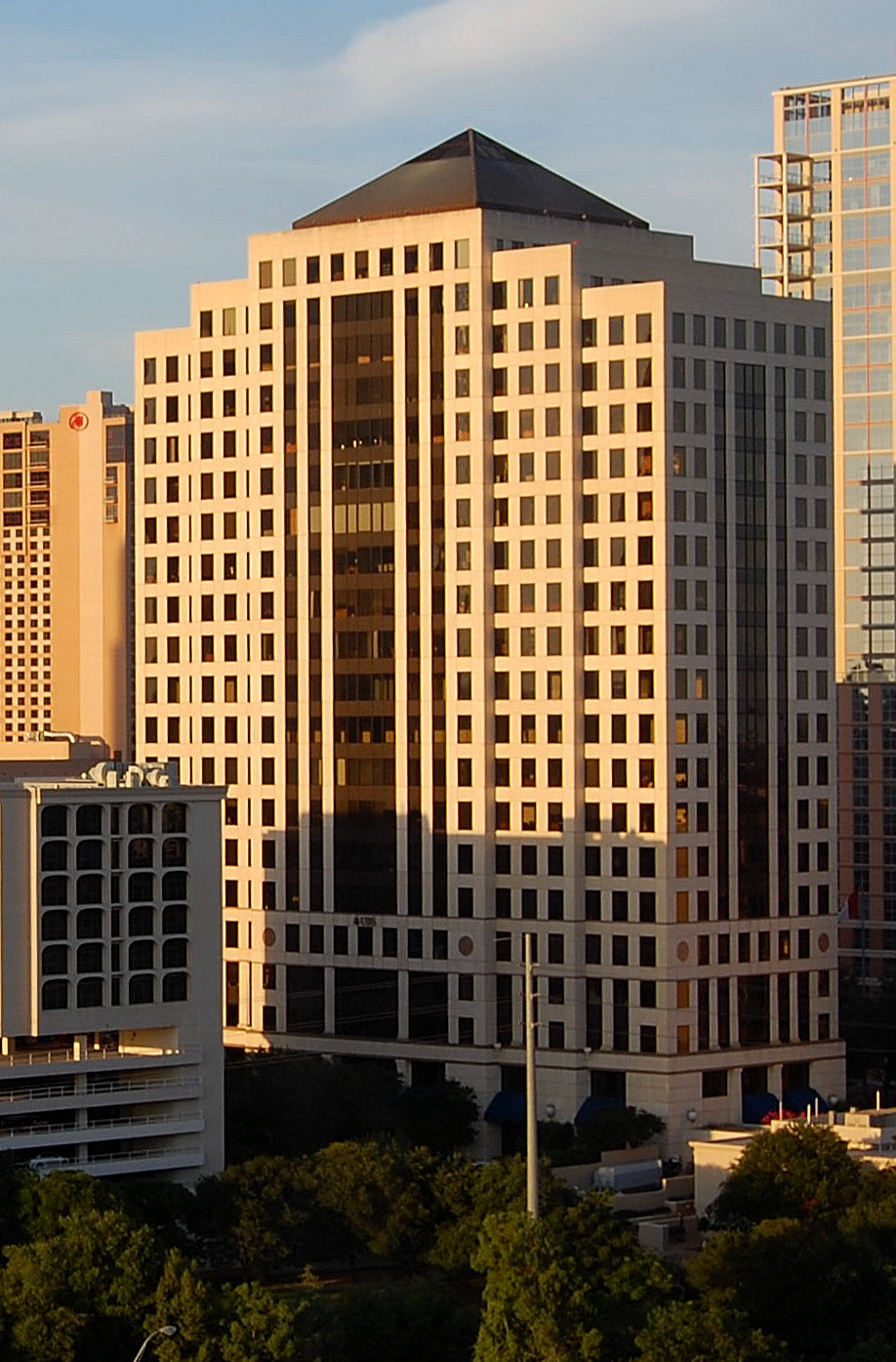
- Interactive map of the San Jacinto Center Town Lake area

General information
- Type: Commercial
- Location: 98 San Jacinto Boulevard, Austin, Texas, United States
- Coordinates: 30°15′44″N 97°44′32″W
- Completed: One San Jacinto Center: 1987; Four Seasons Hotel: 1987; Four Seasons Residences: 2010
- Owner: Cousins Properties

Height
- Roof: 394 ft (120 m)

Technical details
- Floor count: 32; 21; 10

Design and construction
- Architects: HKS, Inc. WZMH Architects; Michael Graves (Four Seasons Residences)

San Jacinto Center is a three-building real estate development in Downtown Austin, Texas. The complex, which overlooks Lady Bird Lake, contains a 21-story office tower, a 10-story Four Seasons Hotel, and the 32-story Four Seasons Residences, a condo skyscraper. The postmodern office tower and hotel are clad in Texas creme limestone and Llano rose granite.

In addition to the towers, the complex is home to numerous restaurants and street-level retail stores. The office tower is home to the headquarters of The Zebra and The Chive.

== History ==
The San Jacinto Center's office tower and hotel component opened on January 14, 1987, with a ribbon cutting ceremony heralded by Austin mayor Frank C. Cooksey and Four Seasons Hotels founder Isadore Sharp. There was originally supposed to be twin office towers; the eastern office building was canceled during the economic downturn of the early 1990s. In 1996, a Houston-based firm planned to buy the parcel of the unbuilt tower. Two San Jacinto Center was to be built to the exact specifications of the existing office tower as originally planned, however, plans fell through and the tower was never built. In 2000, a residential tower was planned for the site of the unbuilt twin tower, but the plans were eventually shelved.

In 2007, construction commenced on the Four Seasons Residences, the 166-unit condominium component of the complex, the second such proposal for a residential tower at the site. Designed by architect Michael Graves, the postmodern tower opened in 2010 and features a brick and glass facade with a rooftop pool and amenity deck.

== Gallery ==
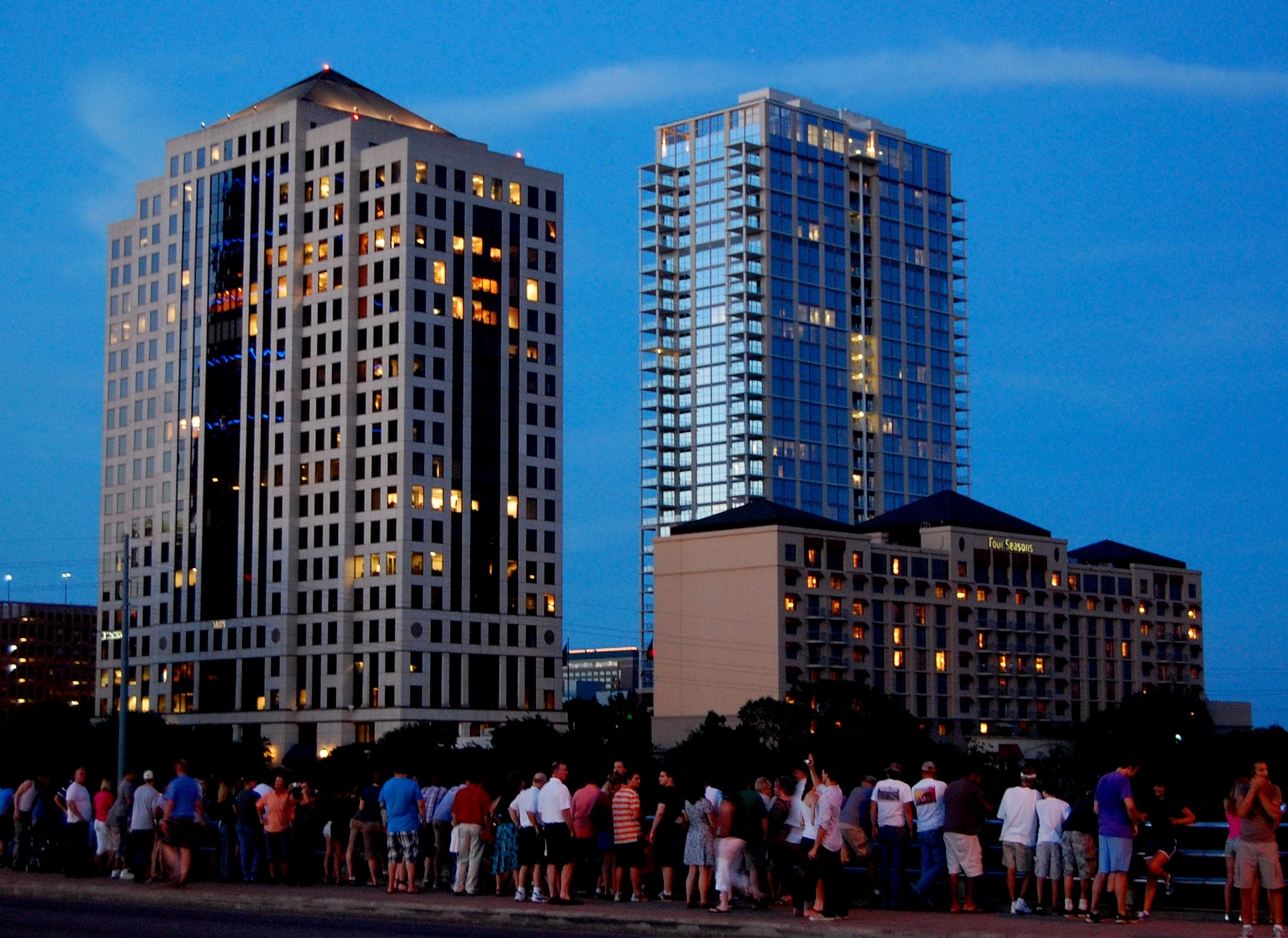
San Jacinto Center viewed from the Congress Avenue Bridge

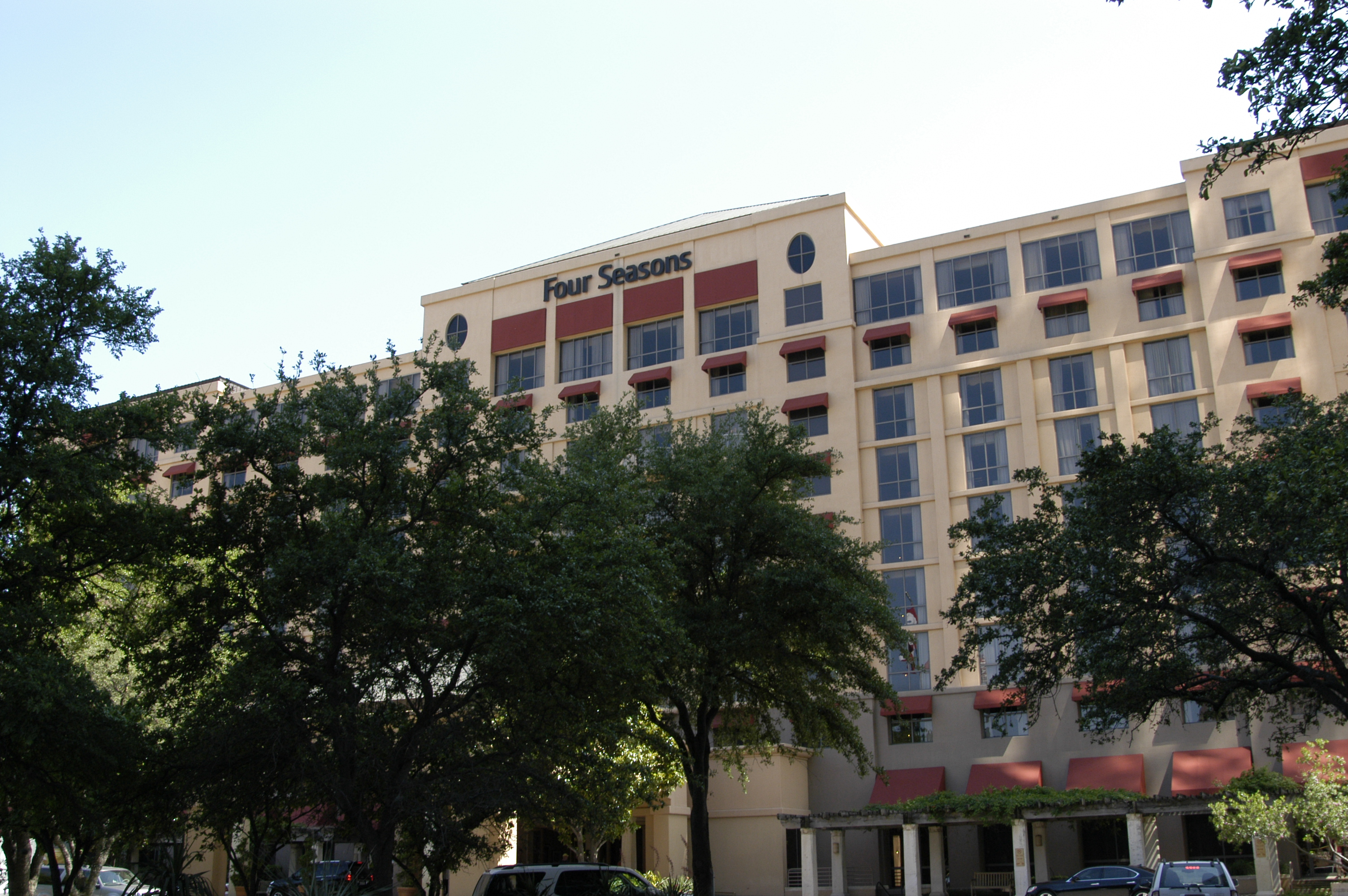
The Four Seasons Hotel

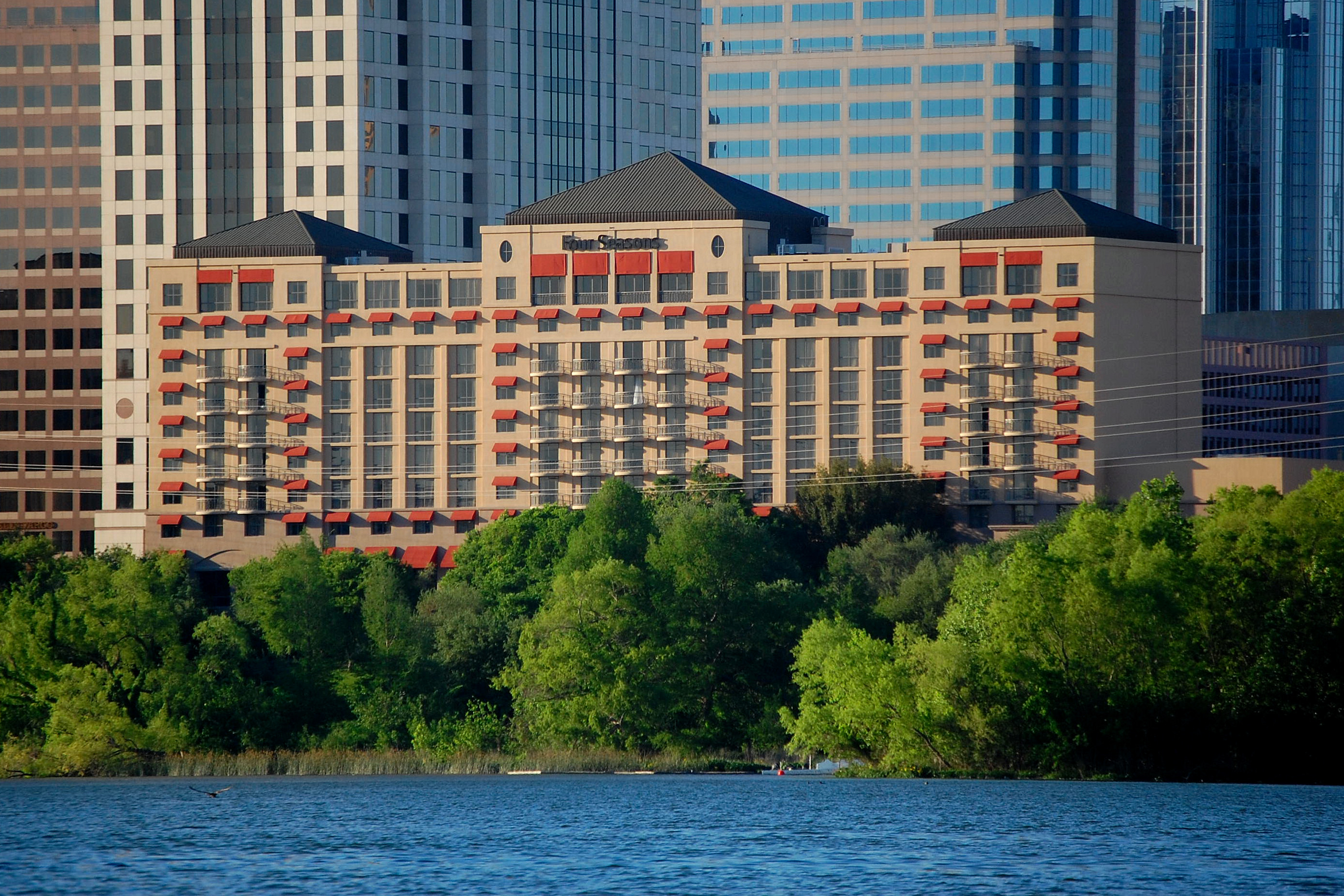
Four Seasons Hotel and One San Jacinto Center from Lady Bird Lake

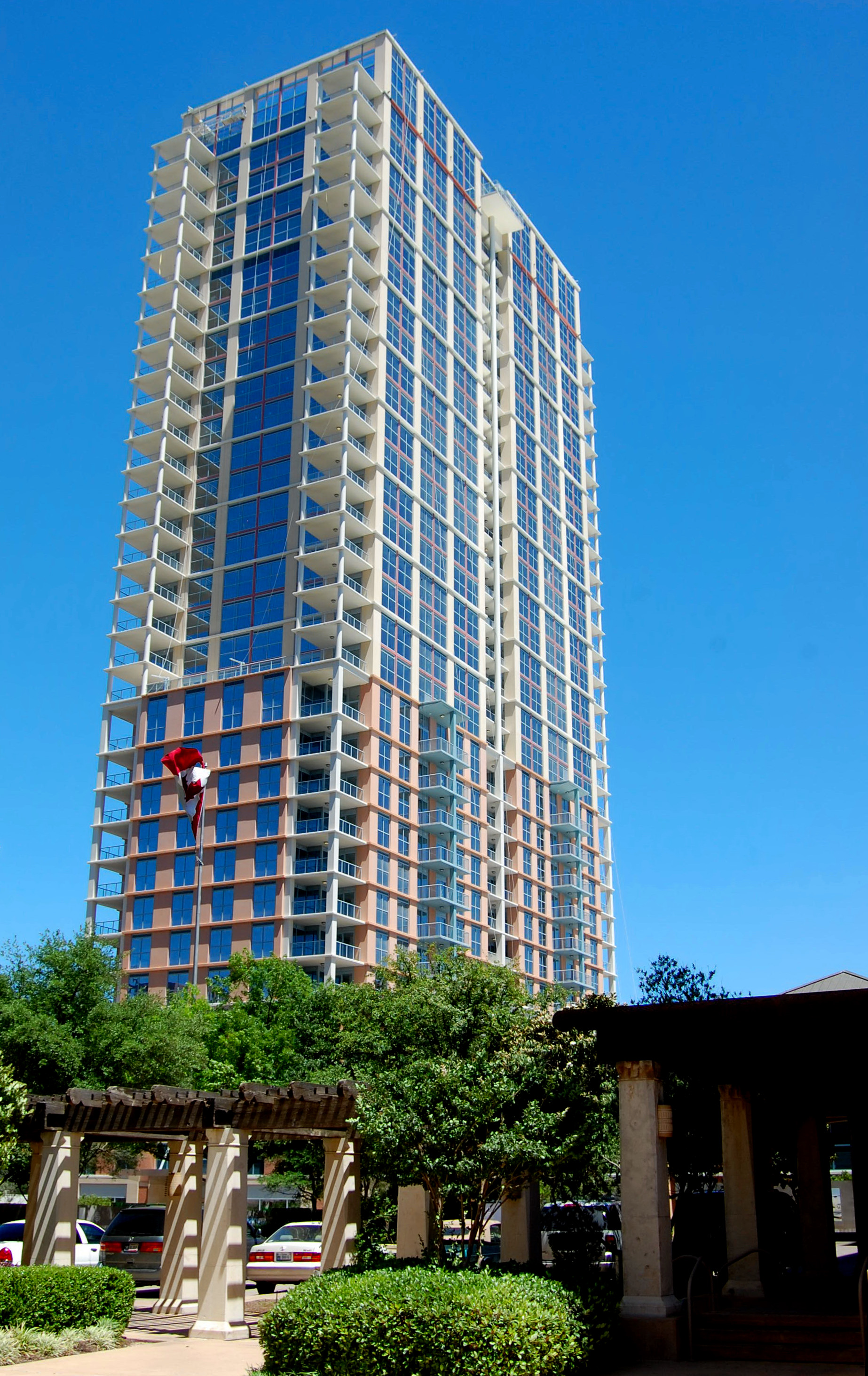
The Four Seasons Residences
