= Joshua Dziabiak =

American entrepreneur and business executive

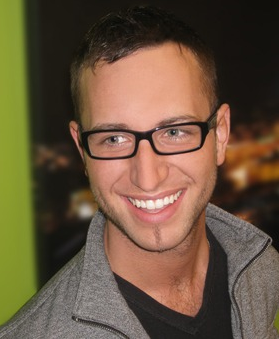
- Born: 1987 (age 38–39); Freedom, Pennsylvania, United States
- Occupations: Businessman, Founder
- Known for: The Zebra; ShowClix; Gawq

Joshua Dziabiak (born 1987) is an American entrepreneur and business executive. He is the Founder of Gawq, ShowClix, MediaCatch and Co-Founder of The Zebra.

Joshua started his first company MediaCatch at the age of 14 and sold the company three years later, making him a millionaire before the age of 18. Joshua served as The Zebra's Chief Operating Officer and Chief Marketing Officer from 2012 to 2020, when he stepped down and started Gawq. He remains on The Zebra's Board of Directors. He is a "mentor" with AlphaLab, a seed-accelerator program for startup companies.

== Early life and education ==
Dziabiak was born in Freedom, Pennsylvania, in 1987. He lived on a 20-acre farm from where his parents ran their own septic-cleaning business.

The family purchased a computer when Dziabiak was 12 years old and he begged them to get Internet access after one of his friends asked him if he had a website.

He left school in the ninth grade during the height of his first business venture, turning to home schooling where he taught himself using CD ROMs.

He eventually moved to Pittsburgh, Pennsylvania, after selling his first company before the age of 18.

== Career ==
Dziabiak began his entrepreneurial career at the age of 14. He used a dial-up connection to surf the Internet and designed his own personal website. This was during the time that most companies did not have an Internet presence, and Dziabiak began designing websites for local businesses. Dziabiak charged a couple hundred dollars for each design, also selling the businesses hosting services. He turned his venture into a company, Media Catch, with 14 full-time employees before he turned 16 years old. He sold the company the following year to a Canadian executive, making Dziabiak a millionaire prior to turning 18 years of age.

Dziabiak used the proceeds from the sale of Media Catch to launch Next In Line Records, an online record label. His plan was to distribute music online, but the company did not work out. Dziabiak had a roster of recording artists that played small- and medium-size venues. He noticed how costly it was for these artists to manage ticket sales for these venues without paying expensive fees to Ticketmaster.

In 2006, he launched ShowClix, a company that helped artists and event organizers with online ticket sales, on-site event operations and promotions, as well as box-office management. Dziabiak was the company's chief executive officer, growing it to 60 employees and $100 million in annual sales in seven years. The company was recognized as one of the “Best Places to Work in Pittsburgh” by the Pittsburgh Business Times.

Dziabiak stepped down as ShowClix's Chief Executive Officer in 2013 to join as Co-founder of The Zebra. The company initially offered quotes from 33 different insurers (approximately 90 percent of the market), requiring only a zip code and vehicle information to obtain a quote. After co-founding The Zebra and serving 8 years as its Chief Operating Officer and Chief Marketing Officer, Joshua stepped-down to start Gawq in March of 2020.

=== Awards and recognition ===
- Dziabiak was named to Inc. magazine's 30 Under 30 list in 2010. The following year he was the recipient of the Pennsylvania Future Business Leaders of America Award.
- In 2011, he was listed as one of 30 Internet Millionaires under the age of 30, as well as being featured as part of CNN's Small Business Success video series.
- He also made Forbes 30 Under 30 list in 2017.

== See also ==
- List of people from Pittsburgh
