= St Richard Gwyn Catholic High School, Flint =

l

Location
- Albert Ave; Flint, Flintshire; Wales; 53.240596°N 3.127563°W

Information
- Type: Mixed Comprehensive Secondary
- Motto: Welsh: Dysgu â'n gilydd yng Nghrist ("Learning together in Christ")
- Established: 1954
- Oversight: Flintshire County Council
- Head teacher: Catherine McCormack
- Chaplain: Fr. Fretch Ballesteros
- Grades: Year 7 – Year 13 (Years 12 & 13 are Sixth Form)
- Gender: Mixed
- Enrollment: 861 (2016)
- Houses: Dewi, Beuno, Gwen
- Nickname: SRG
- Newspaper: Gwyn News
- Affiliation: Roman Catholic
- Website: www.strichardgwynflint.co.uk

St Richard Gwyn Catholic High School is a Catholic co-educational voluntary aided secondary school situated on Albert Avenue in Flint, Flintshire, United Kingdom. It was founded in 1954 to serve the Catholic population of Flintshire.

It is one of three Catholic secondary schools in the Roman Catholic Diocese of Wrexham, the others being St Joseph's Catholic & Anglican High School, Wrexham and Blessed Edward Jones Catholic High School, Rhyl.

== History ==
When the school was founded in 1954 it was named Blessed Richard Gwyn Roman Catholic High School. However, in 1970, Richard Gwyn was canonised, and the school was renamed St Richard Gwyn Catholic High School.

It is a mixed school, currently serving 861 pupils (2016) (including a mixed sixth form of over 120). It draws its pupils and students from the Roman Catholic parishes of Flint, Holywell, Queensferry, Mold, Saltney, Buckley, Connah's Quay, Hawarden and Pantasaph.

Its patron Saint, St Richard Gwyn, was canonized in 1970; prior to this, the school was called "Blessed Richard Gwyn Roman Catholic High School". To mark the feast day of St Richard Gwyn on 17 October the whole school has a Mass, preceded by themed lessons as part of a 'focus week'.

Since 2008, there has been a House System in the school. The houses are named Dewi, Winefride and Beuno.

The school's head teacher is Catherine McCormack. Past headteachers include:

- Mr Burrows (1954 to circa 1973)
- Tom Quinn (2002–2005)
- Derek Doran (2005–2011)
- Ronald Keating (2012–2016)
- Maria Rimmer, interim (2016–2017)
- Carole Philpot
- Mark Philpot
- Patrick Dominic Bryon OBE (for services to Education in Wales)

=== Estyn reports ===
In 2016 the Estyn inspection report labeled the school "unsatisfactory" and placed the school into special measures. This contrasted with the 2008 Estyn Report which labeled the school as "Good". Multiple problems were raised in the report including that performance from 2012–2016 at GCSE level had been "poor" with leadership at the school also being criticised.

Ron Keating, headteacher at the time of the report, stated, "We have already started the work of addressing the findings of the Estyn report with the full support of staff, governors, parents and the local community. All these are working in partnership to make this a rapidly improving school."

In November 2017, Estyn removed the school from the list of schools requiring special measures. The monitoring report stated, "The school is judged to have made sufficient progress in relation to the recommendations following the core inspection in May 2016. As a result, Her Majesty's Chief Inspector of Education and Training in Wales is removing the school from the list of schools requiring special measures."

== Notable former pupils ==
- Michelle Brown MS, UK Independence Party, Member of the National Assembly for Wales
- Paul Draper, lead singer of the band Mansun
- Claire Fox, director of the Institute of Ideas, member of the House of Lords and former MEP for North West England
- Fiona Fox OBE, director of the Science Media Centre
- Simon Nixon, billionaire businessman, co-founder of Moneysupermarket.com
- Ian Rush MBE, footballer
- Hannah Blythyn Member of the Senedd, Deputy Minister for Social Partnership
