= Really Wireless =

Really is a privacy focused telecommunications company, with headquarters in Austin, Texas. The company offers mobile phone plans using a combination of the T-Mobile and their own Really DeWi networks.

== History ==
Really was founded by Adam Lyons, who previously founded an insurance comparison site, The Zebra. Really operates a decentralized wireless mobile network started in Austin, Texas.

In February 2023, Really secured $18 million in funding, led by Polychain Capital and Mike Maples Jr, one of the largest seed rounds for a US telco.

In September 2023, the company partnered with T-Mobile so customers could use both networks, providing expanded coverage including international.

== Features ==
Really is built on a "DeWi" network of small wireless towers, drawing on existing infrastructure to provide service. Tower hosts are compensated by the company, with Really handling all equipment installation.

Lyons has stated: "With decentralized wireless [DeWi], the idea is that the community itself can create cell coverage."

The company offers two phone plans, Limitless which includes unlimited voice, text and data and Clutch which is data only.

== See also ==
- Citizens Broadband Radio Service
