= Martin Lewis (financial journalist) =

British broadcaster (born 1972)

Martin Lewis CBE
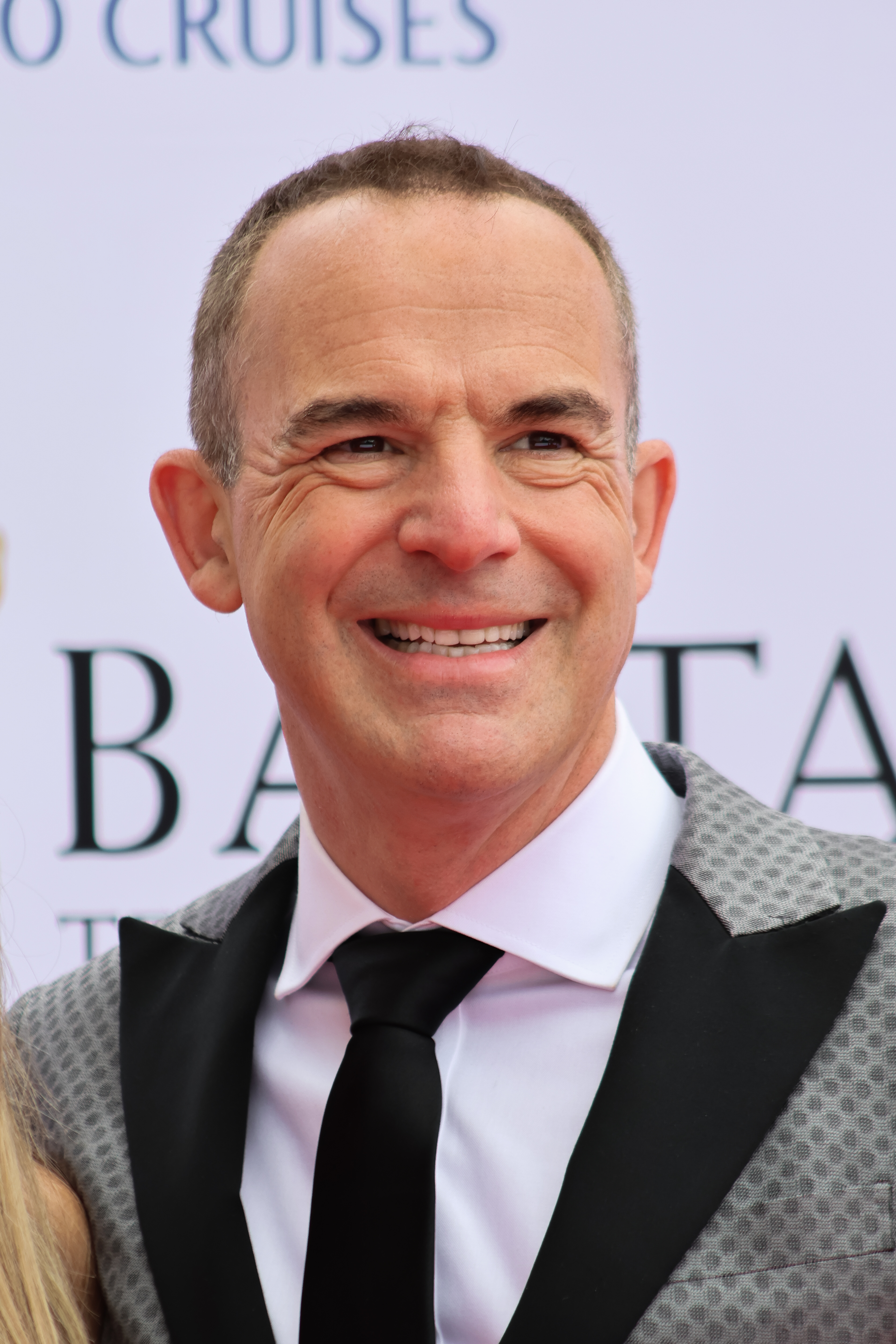
- Lewis in 2026
- Born: Martin Steven Lewis; 9 May 1972 (age 54); Manchester, Lancashire, England
- Education: London School of Economics (BSc); Cardiff University (PgDip)
- Occupations: Television presenter; journalist; author; entrepreneur
- Years active: 1994–present
- Known for: Founder, editor-in-chief of MoneySavingExpert.com
- Television: The Martin Lewis Money Show; This Morning; Good Morning Britain
- Spouse: Lara Lewington (m. 2009)
- Children: 1
- Website: moneysavingexpert.com

Martin Steven Lewis CBE (born 9 May 1972) is a British consumer rights activist, financial journalist, broadcaster, author and charity founder. Lewis founded the website MoneySavingExpert.com. He sold the website in 2012 to the Moneysupermarket.com group for up to £87 million. Lewis is currently a presenter for ITV, on the morning programmes Good Morning Britain and This Morning since 2007. He also presents The Martin Lewis Money Show.

Lewis has led various campaigns on high bank charges, energy bills and student finance costs, as well as the link between mental health and debt.

== Early life and education ==
Lewis was born at Withington Hospital in Manchester in 1972. His family lived in the Manchester suburb of Didsbury. While still a child he moved with his family to the village of Norley, near Delamere Forest in rural Cheshire, where his father was appointed headmaster of Delamere Forest School, a Jewish school for students with special educational needs. His mother, Susan Lewis, died following a horse riding accident, involving a collision with a lorry, when he was aged 11. In later life he became a patron of the children's bereavement charity Grief Encounter and an advocate for life insurance.

Lewis attended The King's School, an independent school in Chester. Lewis has stated that he was subjected to antisemitism as a school boy in Chester, remarking that as one of only two Jewish boys in his year he was given the nickname "Jew". He went on to read Government and Law at the London School of Economics and in 1997 became a postgraduate student in Broadcast Journalism at Cardiff University's Centre for Journalism Studies. In 2013 he was awarded an honorary doctorate in Business Administration from the University of Chester.

== Career ==
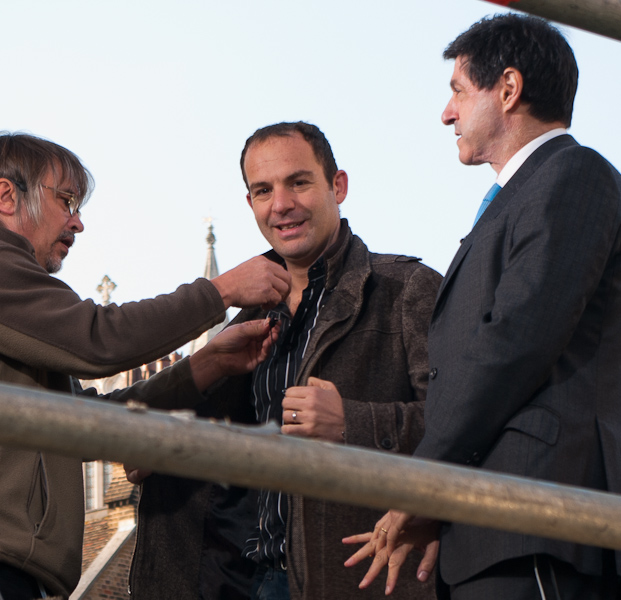
Martin Lewis in 2012

=== Early career ===
After graduating, Lewis was the general secretary of the LSE Students' Union. He then went to work in the City of London for the Brunswick Group, a financial communications consultancy.

=== TV and radio ===
After graduating in journalism at Cardiff University, Lewis became a producer for the BBC Business Unit working on the BBC Radio Five Live business programmes and as an editor of BBC Radio 4's Today programme business slot. Lewis then moved to satellite channel Simply Money, fronted by Angela Rippon, where he cultivated his "Money Saving Expert" persona. From the outset, the channel suffered poor viewing figures and its main backer, Invest TV Resources, withdrew their support in March 2001. Almost all of its 51 staff, including Lewis, lost their jobs.

After the collapse of Simply Money, Lewis contributed to a "Deal of the Week" column in the Sunday Express. Lewis also presented "Money Saving Expert" slots on Channel 5's daytime show, Open House with Gloria Hunniford. Lewis returned to the BBC to work as a business and personal finance reporter for the corporation's BBC One Breakfast News. In 2005, Lewis presented a daytime television series on ITV called Make Me Rich and in 2008 a peak time programme on Five called It Pays to Watch!. Lewis has also presented money special editions for ITV's Tonight and has featured as a "Money Saving Expert" on several other magazine programmes including Good Morning Britain and Lorraine.

Lewis currently appears on ITV's This Morning and as an occasional guest on other news and magazine programmes. In 2012, he began co-presenting The Martin Lewis Money Show, initially with Saira Khan, then with Angellica Bell and since October 2023, with Jeanette Kwakye. He also appeared weekly on the Emma Barnett Show on BBC's Radio Five Live. In June 2020 he was a guest on BBC Radio 4's Desert Island Discs.

In December 2022, Martin Lewis appeared with LadBaby on their Christmas charity single, "Food Aid", a spoof of Band Aid's 1984 charity single Do They Know It's Christmas?.

Lewis competed in the "New Year Treat 2025" special of Taskmaster, against David James, Hannah Fry, Melanie Blatt, and Sue Johnston that Channel 4 aired on 29 December 2024.

=== Money Saving Expert ===
In October 2002 Martin appeared in the Meridian Trust's (now Public Service Broadcasting Trust) live Spotlight Programme "Save yourself a fortune" on ITV Meridian as their Money Saving Expert for the first time. The programme subsequently won the Royal Television Society Educational Award – 2002 Campaigns and Seasons.

Lewis created and ran the website MoneySavingExpert.com (MSE), which was originally designed for a cost of just £100 in February 2003. In September 2012 he sold the website to the Moneysupermarket.com group for up to £87m but remained editor-in-chief. The deal saw Lewis receive £35m cash up front in addition to 22.1m shares in Moneysupermarket.com and £27m in future payments. He simultaneously announced his intention to give £10m to charity, of which £1m would go to Citizens Advice.

In July 2015 Lewis sold just over half his shareholding in Moneysupermarket.com, obtained in the sale of Money Saving Expert, for £25.2 million. On the back of this he gave a further £1m to Citizens Advice and £500,000 each to The Trussell Trust and the Personal Finance Education Group to fund financial triage and education work. In 2018 Lewis started legal action against Facebook for defamation over fake adverts using his face and name, mostly promoting "bitcoin" and "investing". He later dropped the action after Facebook agreed to fund an anti-scam project.

=== Columnist ===
Lewis has a fortnightly column in The Sunday Post and a regional syndicated column in The Yorkshire Post, the Manchester Evening News and the Express & Star amongst others. He has been a columnist for The Sunday Times, News of the World, The Guardian and the Sunday Express. All his columns are on the theme of saving money.

== Controversy ==
=== Unauthorised business promotion ===
In 2010 Martin Lewis was a presenter on GMTV with Lorraine, a weekday morning chat show. The programme includes a regular feature called "Deals of the Week". Ofcom investigated a complaint that the programme promoted MoneySavingExpert.com, a website owned and run by Lewis as a commercial enterprise. Lewis denied any wrongdoing and continues to do so. However the Ofcom report concluded: "By inviting viewers to obtain further information and vouchers on the GMTV website, and then re-directing them to Martin Lewis' commercial website to obtain that information, the programme was effectively promoting his business. As a result of this promotion, the programme was in breach of Rule 10.3 of the Code."

== Campaigns ==
=== Bank charges ===
In late 2005, campaigns against what were claimed to be unfair bank charges gained momentum and a few small websites started to highlight the issue. Lewis was at the forefront of the media campaign to reclaim what he states are unfair and unlawful fees charged by UK banks. He presented the first mainstream television programme on how to reclaim bank fees (ITV1's Tonight) and in November 2006 published a step-by-step guide, including template letters as well as regularly appearing across the media to champion the issue.

His campaign suffered a major setback in November 2009 when the Supreme Court of the United Kingdom ruled that the charges imposed by banks formed part of their fees for current account services and could not be assessed for fairness under the Unfair Terms in Consumer Contracts Regulations. Lewis, along with other consumer groups, hired Ray Cox QC (a barrister with previous experience of banking cases) to look into new legal arguments for account holders wishing to reclaim charges, which might possibly use regulation 5 of the Unfair Terms Act as suggested by the Supreme Court judgement.

This attempt suffered a further setback when, on 22 December 2009, the Office of Fair Trading (OFT) issued a statement saying that it had decided against taking forward such an investigation because it "would have a very limited scope and low prospects of success". Lewis published updated template letters allowing individuals to attempt to recover bank charges on financial hardship grounds on 2 February 2010, and information regarding claims on legal grounds made via courts was published on 24 February 2010.

=== Energy bills ===
In summer 2008, Lewis appeared on several television and radio programmes exhorting consumers to "cap your energy bills now", based on the prediction that there would be a further round of price increases at the end of 2008. "Capping prices" involved consumers locking themselves into rates higher than prevailing un-capped rates. After that point British Gas announced an increase of 30% on its un-capped prices, though in January 2009 UK energy companies' un-capped prices were reduced by up to 10%.

Information published by uSwitch, a price comparison site whose business motivation is to encourage frequent switching between energy suppliers, after the price cuts, in February 2009, suggested that "Those who were savvy enough to sign up to a competitive fixed-price plan last summer, before some increases in wholesale energy were passed on, are sitting pretty as prices would need to drop by 16% on average before it would be worth moving" but failed to be clear about which specific capped deals it was basing this assertion on, and when it was sensible to have committed to a capped rate deal.

=== Student finance ===
In 2011, Lewis launched the Independent Taskforce on Student Finance Information with former National Union of Students president Wes Streeting and backed by the Department for Business, Innovation and Skills, to provide information to potential students about the changes to tuition fees and student loans resulting from the Browne Review. After subtle changes to student loan repayments were announced in the Autumn Statement of 2015, Lewis appealed directly to the Prime Minister and engaged lawyers to investigate. He said that freezing the repayment threshold would represent a retroactive hike in student loan costs that could "destroy any trust" that students have in the student finance and political systems.

=== Mental health and debt ===
In 2016, Lewis launched and provided funding for the Money and Mental Health Policy Institute, a think tank directed by former Liberal Democrat adviser Polly Mackenzie to study the link between mental health issues and debt.

=== Others ===
Lewis' other large-scale campaigns, with ensuing television programmes, include refunds for missold payment protection insurance. Between January 2011 and December 2019 UK banks paid £38.3 billion in compensation for millions of fraudulently sold policies.

== Honours and recognition ==
Lewis became a Governor of the London School of Economics in 2008. He was appointed Officer of the Order of the British Empire (OBE) in the 2014 Birthday Honours for services to consumer rights and to charitable services through the MSE Charity Fund and promoted to Commander of the Order of the British Empire (CBE) in the 2022 New Year Honours for services to broadcasting and consumer rights.

Lewis was named the Best Personal Finance Broadcast Journalist in 2020 by ADVFN.

Lewis requested to be created a crossbench peer in the House of Lords but was rejected by the House of Lords Appointments Commission, which encouraged him to apply again in the future. He believes he was turned down due to work and family obligations leaving him with limited time for parliamentary work but a spokesperson for the appointments commission denied the claimed reasons, stating that some very good candidates were rejected.

In 2022, Lewis won the National Television Award for Best TV Expert.

In November 2023, he was ranked number four in the New Statesman's Left Power List, described by the journal as "having the casting vote" over who can fix the national economy.

In February 2024, Lewis won the RTS Special Award at the Royal Television Society Television Journalism Awards 2024.

The Economist magazine has called Lewis "one of Britain's most recognisable figures" and possibly "the most influential man in British politics". However, writing in 2022, the magazine argued that his money-saving tips had lost their relevance in a world of rising energy prices.

In May 2026, at the 2026 BAFTA Television Awards, Lewis was awarded the BAFTA Television Special Award, in recognition of his extraordinary and lasting impact on British consumers and public life.

== Personal life ==
Lewis has a sister. His father was headmaster of a special educational needs school in Norley, Cheshire. His mother was killed following a horse riding accident on 7 May 1984. Lewis married former 5 News weather presenter Lara Lewington on 31 May 2009. They have one daughter.

Lewis is Jewish and practises the Jewish faith.

As of 2021, the Sunday Times Rich List estimates his net worth at £123 million.

Lewis is a lifelong supporter of Manchester City F.C.

Lewis has said he "has dark days", that his roles cause him stress and that he does not manage stress well.

== Bibliography ==
- (2005) The Money Diet: The Ultimate Guide to Shedding Pounds Off Your Bills and Saving Money on Everything!, Vermilion
- (ed 2006) Thrifty Ways for Modern Days, Vermilion
- (2008) The Three Most Important Lessons You've Never Been Taught: MoneySavingExpert.Com, Vermilion
