= MoneySavingExpert.com =

British consumer finance information and discussion website

- Website type: Finance
- Available in: English
- Owner: Moneysupermarket.com
- Creator: Martin Lewis
- Website: moneysavingexpert.com
- Commercial: Yes
- Launched: February 2003

MoneySavingExpert.com is a British consumer finance information and discussion website, founded by financial journalist Martin Lewis in February 2003. The website's focus is to provide people with information on saving money in the form of deals, tips and journalistic articles, as well as techniques and strategies for exploiting loyalty schemes and incentive-based credit cards. In September 2012, it was bought by the moneysupermarket.com group for a value of £87M. Since 2015, Lewis has taken on the role of executive chairman, overseeing 100 staff and editors reviewing and updating the site.

== Petitions ==
The website has launched three petitions:

- The first aimed to have the secured loan adverts banned from children's television which the site claims received 45,000 signatures. This campaign was the subject of a Parliamentary early day motion.
- The second, launched in collaboration with the Consumer Credit Counselling Service and Credit Action, appealed to Carol Vorderman to stop appearing in secured loan advertising. This petition received over 80,000 signatures.
- The third was in conjunction with the site's work on Bank Charges, and was placed on the UK Prime Minister's website, attracting over 70,000 signatures.

Both of these campaigns have been the subject of Parliamentary early day motions.

== Campaigns ==
In August 2006 the site started to develop a system to check whether people were in the correct council tax band. Over a number of months an increasing number of people reported £1000s in backdated payouts. On 26 January 2007 Martin Lewis presented a Tonight programme on this following up the successes from the site; it rated 4.5 million viewers and saw the site covered in many national newspapers including the full front pages of the Express and Metro.

During late 2005, the issue of reclaiming unfair bank charges was highlighted and a few small websites started to highlight the issue. The site has been one of the main campaigning forces on this ever since. In November 2006 the original article was updated by a step-by-step guide, including template letters which speedily achieved its 1,000,000th download towards the end of February 2007.

Other large-scale campaigns for the website include reclaiming council tax, payment protection insurance, reclaiming mortgage exit fees and reclaiming credit card charges all of which have had over 100,000 people using template letter downloads.

== Charity contributions ==
MoneySavingExpert.com regularly contributes to charities nominated by site users. It is estimated that £100,000 was donated in the 2006-2007 year. In previous years all money has been given to nominated charities based on the percentage of the vote given by site users, but it has been announced that in the future a new registered charity, the MoneySavingExpert.com Charitable Fund, will distribute the money. It has also been announced that a proportion of the money will fund a feasibility study into setting up a "MoneySaving Kids charity" to help educate children about how to be consumers.

In December 2006 the book Thrifty Ways for Modern Days was launched by the site. The book was compiled from advice given on the threads of the MoneySaving Old Style section of the site. As the book was created from community knowledge and only edited by Martin Lewis, it was decided that all profits from the book would go to the MoneySavingExpert.com Charitable Fund.

== Traffic ==
As of September 2020, the site had a global Alexa rank of 8,891 and a UK rank of 175.
