= Beat the Boss =

- Genre: Children's Game show
- Presented by: Saira Khan (2006–2009); Cameron Johnson (2009)
- Opening theme: "Club Foot" by Kasabian
- Composers: Tom Meighan; Sergio Pizzorno
- Country of origin: United Kingdom
- Original language: English
- No. of series: 5
- No. of episodes: 36

Production
- Running time: 30 minutes

Original release
- Network: BBC One
- Release: 22 May 2006 – 15 September 2009

Beat the Boss is a British children's game show that aired from 22 May 2006 to 15 September 2009. It was presented by Saira Khan for the first four series and later by Cameron Johnson for the final series.

== Format ==
The format features two teams, one team of children named "The Bright Sparks", and one team of adults named "The Big Shots", creating a product that will appeal to the children's market. At the end of each episode, a panel of children vote for their favourite product and the team with the most votes wins the Beat the Boss trophy and a limousine ride home, while the losing team has to take the bus.

== Transmissions ==
Series	Start date	End date	Episodes
1	22 May 2006	26 May 2006	5
Special	9 March 2007		1
2	16 April 2007	20 August 2007	10
3	3 March 2008	10 March 2008	6
4	8 January 2009	19 March 2009	10
5	18 August 2009	15 September 2009	5
