= Guess This House =

2015 British game show

- Genre: Game show
- Created by: James Woolley; Liz Gaskell
- Presented by: Saira Khan
- Theme music composer: Ed Godsall
- Country of origin: United Kingdom
- Original language: English
- No. of series: 1
- No. of episodes: 25

Production
- Running time: 60 minutes (inc. adverts)
- Production company: 12 Yard

Original release
- Network: ITV
- Release: 27 July – 28 August 2015

Guess This House is a British game show that has aired on ITV from 27 July to 28 August 2015 and is presented by Saira Khan.

== Format ==
Two teams of two evaluate houses and contents from the same county. The houses are evaluated by an estate agent, and the contents are valued by an independent valuer.

In round 1, the two teams rummage round the same house. They have fifteen minutes in the house each; although they go in separately, the footage flip-flops between the two teams. There are four bonus items in the house; if they guess which of the two values are correct, they win a bonus point. They must then guess the value of the house and contents separately; whichever guess is closest receives three points. There is a total of ten points available in this round. The same is true of round two, except in this round both teams only have ten minutes each.

In round 3, the points obtained are converted into extra minutes, and whoever has the most points goes in first. A staggered entry system (similar to the one used in Dale's Supermarket Sweep) is used; both teams finish at the same time, but they start at different points. Once time is up, they submit combined totals for the house and contents; whoever is closest wins £1,000. After the break, the winning team is revealed, but the price is not; for another £1,000, they must guess which of two prices they think to be correct.
