= Saira Khan =

British television personality (born 1970)

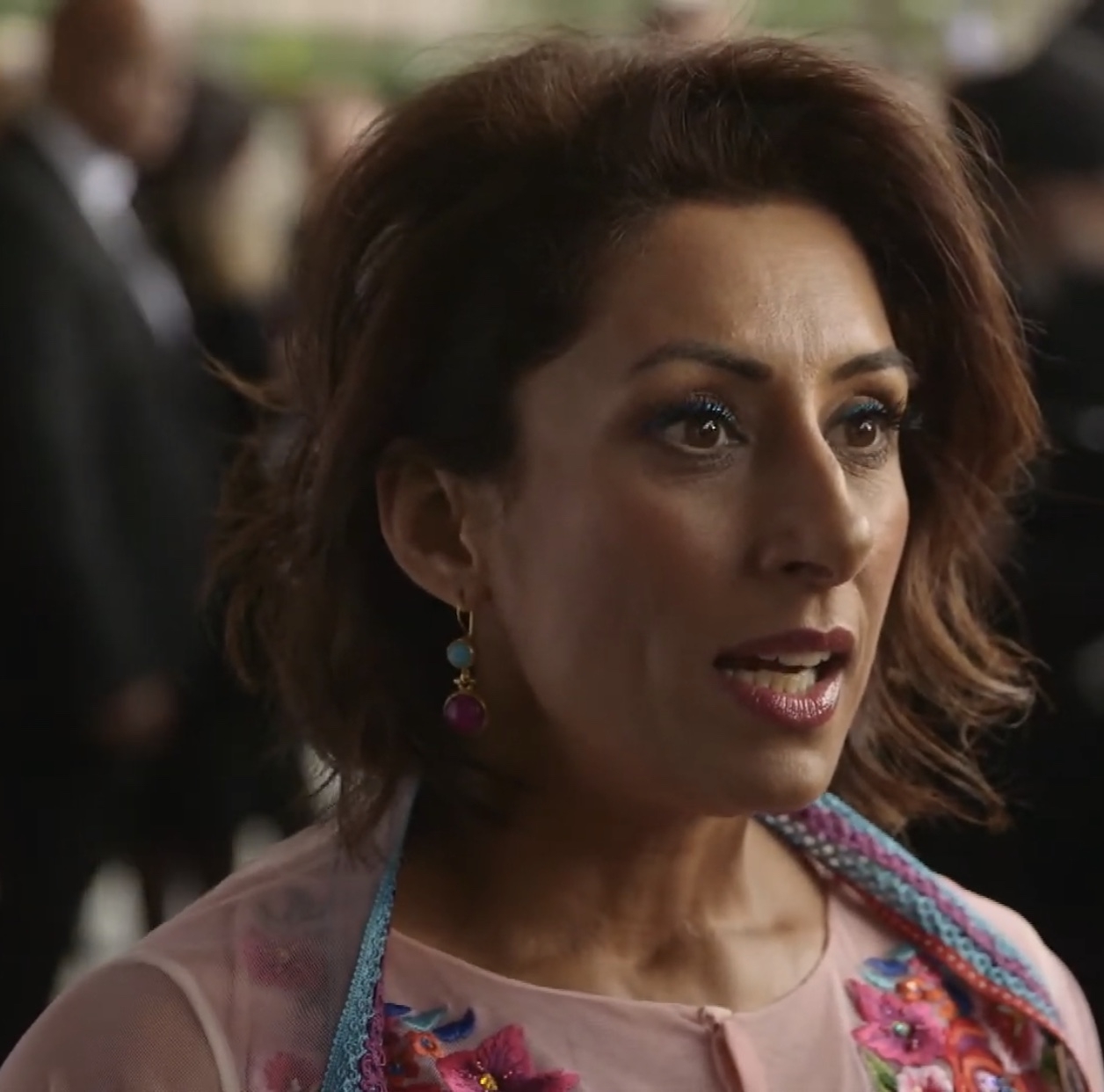
- Khan at the 7th Asian Awards in 2017
- Born: 15 May 1970 (age 56); Long Eaton, Derbyshire, England
- Education: Brighton Polytechnic
- Occupations: Television personality; businesswoman
- Agent: Melanie Blake
- Television: The Apprentice (2005); Beat the Boss (2006–2009); The Great Sport Relief Bake Off (2012); The Martin Lewis Money Show (2012–2017); Guess This House (2015); Loose Women (2015–2020); Celebrity Big Brother (2016); Dancing on Ice (2019)
- Spouse: Steven Hyde (m. 2004)
- Children: 2

Saira Khan (born 15 May 1970) is a British television personality. She was a contestant on the first series of The Apprentice in 2005, in which she finished as the runner-up. In 2012, Khan competed in the first series of The Great Sport Relief Bake Off. From 2012 to 2017, Khan co-presented The Martin Lewis Money Show, and in 2015, she presented the ITV series Guess This House.

From 2015 to 2020, she was a regular panelist on the ITV talk show Loose Women. Khan has also competed in the eighteenth series of Celebrity Big Brother in 2016, and in 2019, she competed in the eleventh series of Dancing on Ice.

== Early life ==
Khan was born in Long Eaton, Derbyshire to Pakistani immigrants from Rawalakot, in Azad Kashmir, Pakistan on 15 May 1970. She had a difficult childhood; her father was violent and died when she was 28.

== Career ==
Khan's first TV appearance was in a 2001 episode of Channel 4's investigative documentary Sleepers as an undercover reporter portraying as a shopkeeper opening a shop at Langley Mill, an area where racist attacks frequently occurred.

In 2005, she was a contestant on the first series of the business-reality show, The Apprentice, finishing as the runner-up behind Tim Campbell.

In 2006, Khan presented Temper Your Temper, a programme dealing with anger management. She has presented several documentaries for the BBC including Saira Khan's Pakistan Adventure in 2007 and Adopting Abroad, Saira's Story in 2011, as well as appearing as a guest on a variety of BBC and ITV shows such as Ready Steady Cook and Countdown. She presented the CBBC show Trade Your Way to the USA and previously presented Beat the Boss. She presented an edition of the BBC's Money Programme about entrepreneurial mothers. Khan has also contributed to radio notably to Radio 4's Woman's Hour and Radio 2's The Jeremy Vine Show as well as Radio 4's Any Questions?.

Khan also runs her own baby-products business called Miamoo. She has also written a self-help book, P.U.S.H. For Success. From 2012 until 2017, she co-hosted The Martin Lewis Money Show alongside Martin Lewis but was replaced by Ranvir Singh. In 2015, she appeared with her son on Big Star's Little Star where they won £14,000 for charity. In 2015, she hosted Guess This House, a daytime game show for ITV. In September 2015, she became a regular panelist on Loose Women, in which she appeared until 2020. In 2015, she appeared on an episode of Pointless Celebrities.

In July 2016, Khan entered the Celebrity Big Brother house and took part in the show's eighteenth series. On 9 August, she became the second housemate to be voted out of the Big Brother house. Khan took part in a celebrity edition of The Chase, aired in July 2017, being knocked out in the first round by Mark Labbett. On 6 January 2018, Khan took part in And They're Off!, where she placed fifth. In 2019, Khan took part in the eleventh series of Dancing on Ice, and finished in ninth place, alongside her professional partner Mark Hanretty.

In January 2021, she announced her imminent departure from Loose Women, so she could "focus on her skincare business, SairaSkin, and other media projects". Khan has stated that she wanted her place on the panel to go to a gay, transgender, or non-binary person. She competed in the third series of Celebrity SAS: Who Dares Wins.

== Personal life ==
Khan married her husband, fellow business person Steven Hyde, in December 2004, and had her son, Zac, in 2008 through IVF. In 2011, following a miscarriage and difficulties in trying to conceive a second child, Khan traveled to the Edhi Foundation Orphanage in Karachi, Pakistan, where she adopted her daughter Amara when she was 4 days old. Khan described her experience on Loose Women in 2018, and also documented the adoption process in a documentary on BBC Two, Adopting Abroad: Saira's Story. In March 2017, Khan appeared on 'This Morning', where she argued for businesses to have the ability to deny people jobs or request their workers to take off religious dress like a headscarf etc. In February 2021, Khan said of her faith in a Daily Mirror column that "As a 50-year-old educated, independent woman with my own family and life experiences, I now have the courage to say that I'm no longer a practising Muslim".

== Awards and nominations ==
In January 2013 and 2015, Khan was nominated for the Services to Media award at the British Muslim Awards.

== See also ==
- List of Celebrity Big Brother (British TV series) housemates
- List of Dancing on Ice contestants
- Pakistan–United Kingdom relations
