= AlphaLab =

US startup accelerator company

- Industry: Startup accelerator
- Founded: 2008; 18 years ago
- Founder: Jim Jen
- Headquarters: Pittsburgh, Pennsylvania, United States
- Products: Venture capital, investments
- Parent: Innovation Works
- Website: alphalab.org

AlphaLab is an American technology startup accelerator based in Pittsburgh, Pennsylvania. It was founded in 2008 by Jim Jen. AlphaLab has four tracks, Software, Hardware (AlphaLab Gear), Life Sciences (AlphaLab Health), and Robotics (Robotics Factory).

== History ==
AlphaLab was founded in 2008 by Jim Jen to help startups develop and launch their products, grow their customer base, and secure venture capital funding. The specific amount of funding provided by AlphaLab is up to $100,000, depending on the startup's needs and stage of development. AlphaLab follows a similar structure to Y Combinator. The accelerator is a subsidiary of Innovation Works, which receives funding from the state of Pennsylvania for economic development. It focuses on technology startups headquartered in the Pittsburgh region. AlphaLab was one of the first 10 accelerators in the United States and one of the first 100 accelerators in the World.

AlphaLab created AlphaLab Gear (hardware track) in 2013 and AlphaLab Health (life sciences track) in 2021, each operating as part of the AlphaLab accelerator program.

== Programs ==
AlphaLab has four tracks, Software, Hardware (AlphaLab Gear), Life Sciences (AlphaLab Health), and Robotics (Robotics Factory). The AlphaLab program provides startups with many resources and mentorship support, including access to office space, funding, programming, and mentorship.

AlphaLab’s curriculum is built around three principles that they call "the 3 Cs": Customer, Capital, and Community.

In the past, the collective AlphaLab has hosted a Demo Day to showcase the latest technology produced by their startup cohorts.

=== AlphaLab Gear ===
AlphaLab Gear, launched in 2013, is the hardware track of the AlphaLab accelerator, with a specific focus on supporting hardware, internet of things (IoT), and robotics startups. In the past, AlphaLab Gear hosted a yearly hardware startup pitch contest called the Hardware Cup where startups compete for $50,000 in investment.

=== AlphaLab Health ===
Launched in 2022, AlphaLab Health, is the healthcare and life sciences track of the AlphaLab accelerator. It was billed as a collaboration between their parent company Innovation Works and regional hospital network Allegheny Health Network as a way to streamline medical device prototypes. This became an evergreen fund in 2024 after a $10M anonymous donation.

== Alumni companies ==
- Identified Technologies, a drone mapping company
- NoWait, a restaurant booking company, acquired by Yelp for $40 million
- Spoken, a software company that develops an augmentative and alternative communication app
- The Zebra, an insurance company

== See also ==
- Startup accelerator
