= It Pays to Watch! =

British television series

- Genre: Money saving show
- Presented by: Martin Lewis; Ruth Liptrot
- Country of origin: United Kingdom

Production
- Producer: Money Saving Productions
- Running time: 30 minutes (including adverts)

Original release
- Network: Channel 5
- Release: 9 January – 5 November 2008

It Pays to Watch! is a money saving show presented and written by money saving expert Martin Lewis, co-presented by Ruth Liptrot. It aired on UK terrestrial channel Channel 5. It was repeated on UK digital channel Fiver as an extended version on Sundays providing extra tips known as It Pays to Watch More!

A new series began on 17 September 2008. Lewis made £20,000 for each series. The show was cancelled by December 2008.

== Premise ==
The show aims to help save and make consumers money. Money saving tips have ranged from claiming back old bank charges, something Lewis has campaigned for to completing surveys on the internet to make some extra cash. Lewis often states he wants consumers to take revenge on corporations to claim back money rightfully theirs.

== Format ==
The show comprised four parts.

Challenge	There is normally a consumer challenge every week. Usually, it relates to current affairs. For example, rising domestic energy prices prompted a challenge for members of the audience to see how much they could reduce their bills by switching to a different company. This is ongoing throughout the show; the results are revealed at the end of the show.
Viewer Case Study	This section shows a viewer who has been making money doing simple things or saving a substantial amount.
Celebrity Interview	Lewis interviews a celebrity and delves through their finances and offers money saving ideas. At the end, he provides a figure he could save them if they followed his advice (apart from the first show where he indicated how much money they were throwing down the drain).
Money Saving News	This section provides up-to-date bargains. It has featured the highest interest rate paying savings account, information about the ongoing legal battle on bank charges and fuel prices.

== Reception ==
Andrew Greenhalgh of the Liverpool Echo praised the programme, writing, "Lewis's sheer zest for saving people money makes him an extremely watchable frontman" and concluded, "Ultimately, It Pays To Watch does exactly what it says on the tin and is a programme you can't afford to miss." In a positive review, Lancashire Telegraph television critic Jemma Humphreys said, "What I like about him is he tells us realistic ways of saving money that we can practise every day, he knows the loopholes and the best deals. ... It’s great to see someone so passionate about a subject, I suppose it's no wonder as he’s the only man clever enough to be raking it in while everyone else skates on thin ice."
