= ShowClix =

- Founded: 2007
- Founder: Joshua Dziabiak, Lynsie Campbell
- Headquarters: Wexford, Pennsylvania, USA
- Area served: Worldwide
- Key people: Michael Marty (CEO of Leap Event Technology)
- Parent: Leap Event Technology
- Website: showclix.com

ShowClix is an online event technology company for live and virtual events headquartered in Wexford, Pennsylvania that handles ticket sales, marketing, and on-site operations for fandom conventions, museums, attractions, festivals, consumer shows, and music and comedy venues. New York Comic Con, Candytopia, and Rick Bronson's House of Comedy are among ShowClix's clients.

== History ==
The company was founded in 2007 by Joshua Dziabiak and Lynsie Campbell, initially as an event registration database. The pair later focused on creating a web-based ticketing solution. Prior to forming the company, Dziabiak met Campbell while working together at Spreadshirt, an online platform for creating and selling personalized apparel.

The company was launched in 2011.

On July 31, 2017, ShowClix received a strategic investment by Providence Strategic Growth ("PSG"), the growth equity affiliate of Providence Equity Partners. With that investment, ShowClix and PatronManager became the first two products at Patron Technology.

In 2019, ShowClix apologized for a ticketing "meltdown" at Burning Man that led to difficulty getting tickets, which ShowClix chalked up to a "manual intervention" during a sale.

On September 24, 2020, Patron Technology received another strategic investment, this time from Vector Capital, a leading private equity firm specializing in transformational investments in established technology businesses. The firm has about $4 Billion of capital under management, and believes that, with their investment, Patron Technology and all products underneath its umbrella will rise in the live events industry once the COVID-19 pandemic in which they made their initial investment ends.

== Recognition ==
- Amplify's 16 to Watch in 2016
- Pittsburgh's Top Workplaces in 2017 by the Pittsburgh Post-Gazette,
- Pittsburgh's Fastest Growing Companies in 2017 by the Pittsburgh Business Times.
- NEXT Pittsburgh's 12 Pittsburgh tech companies to watch in 2018

== See also ==
- List of corporations in Pittsburgh
