= The Martin Lewis Money Show =

- Genre: Personal finance
- Presented by: Martin Lewis; Saira Khan (2012–2017); Ranvir Singh (2016–2017 specials); Angellica Bell (2017—2023); Lucrezia Millarini (2023 specials); Jeanette Kwakye (2023–present)
- Country of origin: United Kingdom
- Original language: English
- No. of series: 13
- No. of episodes: 153 regular, 40 specials

Production
- Production locations: The London Studios (2012–2018); Studio TC2, Television Centre (2018–2026); The H Club Studio (2026–)
- Running time: 30, 45 or 60 minutes (regular); 30, 60, 75 or 90 minutes (specials)
- Production company: Multistory Media

Original release
- Network: ITV
- Release: 25 September 2012 – present

Related
- Tonight; Martin Lewis' Extreme Savers

The Martin Lewis Money Show is a British current affairs show that has been broadcast on ITV since 25 September 2012, hosted by Martin Lewis. For the first six series the co-presenter was Saira Khan, who was then replaced by Angellica Bell, until she left and Jeanette Kwakye took over in the thirteenth series. The show celebrated 100 regular episodes on 25 February 2021.

== Format and broadcasting ==
Until 2020, regular episodes of the main series, shown on ITV were 30 minutes - and was a mix of filmed "roadshows" and up to date product and financial information. There are also 'Martin Lewis Money Show LIVE' specials, usually filmed in front of a live audience at various locations - where viewers can contact the show to ask questions during it. During 2020, a series of live special Coronavirus programmes were shown, which were so popular that an extended run of live shows began in September 2020, to run during term times until Easter 2021. Due to the show's popularity and good ratings, from October 2022 the length of each regular programme was extended to an hour. As part of schedule changes at ITV, the programme running time was reduced to 45 minutes from January 2026.

== Ratings ==
As of 2016, the main show received ratings of 3 to 4m viewers, and most weeks headed the top 10 current affairs show ratings in Broadcast magazine.

== Transmissions ==
Series	Start date	End date	Episodes	Co-presenter
1	25 September 2012	11 December 2012	6	Saira Khan
2	21 March 2013	24 May 2013	10	Saira Khan
3	3 January 2014	7 February 2014	6	Saira Khan
4	28 November 2014	6 February 2015	9	Saira Khan
5	23 November 2015	12 February 2016	10	Saira Khan
6	29 November 2016	20 February 2017	10	Saira Khan
7	27 November 2017	26 February 2018	10	Angellica Bell
8	26 November 2018	25 February 2019	10	Angellica Bell
9	25 November 2019	24 February 2020	10	Angellica Bell
10	17 September 2020	18 March 2021	23	Angellica Bell
11	23 September 2021	8 March 2022	20	Angellica Bell
12	18 October 2022	21 March 2023	16	Angellica Bell
13	31 October 2023	20 February 2024	13	Jeanette Kwakye
14	29 October 2024	18 March 2025	15	Jeanette Kwakye
15	4 November 2025	TBA 2026	TBA	Jeanette Kwakye

=== Specials ===
Date	Title	Co-presenters
12 November 2013	12 Saves of Christmas	Saira Khan
22 November 2016	60 Minute Live Special	Saira Khan & Ranvir Singh
28 March 2017	60 Minute Live Special	Saira Khan & Ranvir Singh
20 June 2017	60 Minute Live Holiday Special	Ranvir Singh
21 November 2017	60 Minute Live Special	Angellica Bell
9 January 2018	60 Minute Live Special	Angellica Bell
12 June 2018	60 Minute Live Holiday Special	Angellica Bell
25 September 2018	75 Minute Live Special	Angellica Bell
20 November 2018	60 Minute Live Special	Angellica Bell
8 January 2019	60 Minute Live Special	Angellica Bell
2 April 2019	60 Minute Live Brexit Special	Angellica Bell
17 September 2019	60 Minute Live Special	Angellica Bell
26 November 2019	60 Minute Live Special	Angellica Bell
7 January 2020	60 Minute Live Special	Angellica Bell
19 March – 2 April; 16 April – 21 May 2020	Coronavirus Live Specials (9 x 30min)	Angellica Bell
4 June 2020 – 9 July 2020	Coronavirus Live Specials (6 x 30min)	Angellica Bell
10 September 2020	60 Minute Live Special	Angellica Bell
24 November 2020	75 Minute Live Christmas Special	Angellica Bell
18 May 2021	60 Minute Live Summer Special	Angellica Bell
25 November 2021	60 Minute Live Christmas Special	Angellica Bell
8 March 2022	60 Minute Live Cost of Living Special	Angellica Bell
24 May 2022	60 Minute Ask Martin Anything Special	Angellica Bell
22 September 2022	Live Energy & Cost of Living Special	Angellica Bell
16 March 2023	Live Chancellor's Budget Special	Angellica Bell
11 July 2023	Live Emergency Mortgage Special	Lucrezia Millarini (Note: Guest presenter due to Angellica Bell leaving at the end of the previous series due to other commitments)
10 October 2023	30 Minute Get Britain Talking Special	Lucrezia Millarini
12 March 2024	Live Budget Special	Jeanette Kwakye
31 October 2024	Live Budget Special	Jeanette Kwakye
20 May 2025	Live Summer Special	Jeanette Kwakye
18 November 2025	60 Minute Live Christmas Special	Jeanette Kwakye
17 November 2026	60 Minute Live Christmas Special	

=== Martin Lewis' Extreme Savers ===
Series	Start date	End date	Episodes
1	12 May 2021	2 June 2021	4
