= Simon Nixon =

British billionaire businessman (born 1967)

- Born: Simon Justin Nixon; 7 August 1967 (age 58); Stamford, Lincolnshire, England
- Education: St Richard Gwyn Catholic High School, Flint
- Alma mater: University of Nottingham (dropped out)
- Occupations: Co-founder and deputy chairman, Moneysupermarket.com

Simon Justin Nixon (born 7 August 1967) is a British billionaire businessman, the co-founder of and former deputy chairman of Moneysupermarket.com.

== Early life ==
Nixon was born in Stamford, Lincolnshire, on 7 August 1967. He spent the early part of his childhood moving frequently due to his father's Royal Air Force assignments. At the age of seven, he returned to England after four years in Germany, having never attended school. He was then educated at St Richard Gwyn Catholic High School in Flint, followed by the University of Nottingham, but dropped out because he found his accountancy degree "boring".

== Career ==
Moneysupermarket was established in 1993 by Nixon, at the time a student at the University of Nottingham, and Duncan Cameron as a provider of off-line mortgage information to independent financial advisors under the name Mortgage 2000. and in 1999 launched moneysupermarket.com providing on-line mortgage information. Since then the business has been developed to provide credit card and personal loan information. Nixon is currently the second largest shareholder in the company, behind Capital Group.

In December 2015, The Guardian reported that his next share sale, on which he avoided British capital gains tax at 28% having moved to Jersey in 2013, would make him a billionaire. In 2016 Nixon sold his remaining 6.9% stake for £124m.

Nixon runs an international luxury holiday rental website, Simon Escapes, offering holiday homes in some of his favourite destinations.

Nixon has said that backing fast-growing businesses helped him become a billionaire. He has invested over £100m into startups including organic food and drink website The Food Market and Kabbee, a price comparison and booking app for London minicabs.

== Personal life ==
In 2013, Nixon had been living in Chester, and was considering moving abroad, because the British weather is so "bloody awful", but added that "I will always keep my roots in Chester. I would never sell my house in Chester - it’s where my family and friends are."

In 2013, Nixon moved to Jersey. He has a "long term girlfriend", and also owns homes in Cornwall, Lake Windermere, Deia, Majorca, and Barbados. His property in Malibu, California, dubbed "The Fortress", survived the Palisades Fire in 2025 with minimal damage.

In 2025, the Sunday Times Rich List estimated his net worth to be £1.95 billion.
