= The Zebra =

Insurance comparison site

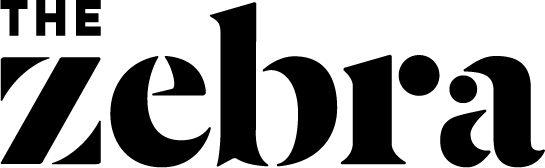
- Formerly: Insurance Zebra
- Industry: Vehicle Insurance
- Founded: 2012; 14 years ago, Pittsburgh, Pennsylvania, United States
- Founder: Adam Lyons & Joshua Dziabiak
- Headquarters: Austin, Texas, United States
- Key people: Keith Melnick (CEO); Joshua Dziabiak (COO & CMO); Meetesh Karia (CTO)
- Website: thezebra.com

The Zebra is an insurance comparison site with headquarters in Austin, Texas. It compares rates from over 200 insurance carriers.

== History ==
The Zebra was co-founded by Joshua Dziabiak and Adam Lyons. Originally named Insurance Zebra, the company was initially started in Pittsburgh, Pennsylvania while Lyons was living in a friend's basement and collecting unemployment checks.

The Zebra was part of the Alpha Lab Incubator Program run by the Pittsburgh venture capital firm Innovation Works, where it gained the attention of venture capital fund Silverton Partners.

During a private beta period, the company showed testers 280,000 quotes.

The company received $1.5 million in seed funding from investors that included Mark Cuban, Silverton Partners, Floodgate, and Birchmere Labs. The funding was used to officially launch the website, with the company relocating to Austin, Texas.

In September 2013, having closed a $3 million extended seed round, the company launched to the public in both Texas and California, the two states with the most drivers. It initially offered quotes from 33 different insurers (approximately 90% of the market), requiring only a zip code and vehicle information to obtain a quote, although answering more questions, such as driving history, improved the accuracy of the quote. Companies included State Farm, Geico, and Allstate, as well as specialized insurers. The quotes were provided from a direct relationship that The Zebra had with the insurers, or through a rate manual from companies that it did not have a direct relationship with. The Zebra included real-time updating of quotes as users moved through the Q&A sections, and allowed users to shop anonymously. In addition to providing quotes, the company lets drivers learn about companies’ coverage and evaluate claims satisfaction.

The website allowed a more detailed quote for users who answered additional questions such as driving history. By the end of 2013, The Zebra was available to users in all 50 states, while increasing its platform to 204 companies that included 22 carriers such as Esurance and The General. It also received an additional $3 million of funding from its existing investors, adding investor Simon Nixon to the list of new investors.

In January 2016, The Zebra announced that it closed $17 million in Series A funding with investment from Cuban, Mike Maples Jr., Nixon, Silverton, and new investors Daher Capital and Ballast Point Ventures, bringing total funding to over $21 million. The company planned to use the additional funding to create educational tools that explain to drivers what's behind their rates, and how they can reduce rates while increasing coverage.

In 2017, The company announced a $40 million series B funding round, led by Accel Partners, bringing their fundraising total to $61.5 million. The company also brought on Keith Melnick as CEO. In 2017 the company added an "Insurability Score" which shows consumers to see what impacts their insurance risk, similar to a credit score for credit.

In 2018, Lyons left The Zebra and stepped aside from both day-to-day operations and his role as chairman of the board.

The Zebra has received national media attention. NBC Nightly News recommended The Zebra as a tool to compare car insurance quotes and save on rates.

=== Company recognition ===
The company issued a joke which Time Magazine included in its Best April Fools’ Pranks of 2014, and the company was named a Best Place to Work in Austin for four consecutive years from 2015 through 2019.

== Funding ==
In September 2017, The Zebra received a $40 million Series B round of funding. In 2019, revenue grew almost 200% to nearly $37 million. In February 2020, the company announced a $38.5 million Series C funding round. Just like the Series B round, the Series C was led by Accel.

== Business model ==
The Zebra offers a way for consumers to get real-time quotes from car insurance companies by filling out an online form. As the driver fills out the form, answering more questions about things like their age, driving record, and credit score, the quotes increase in accuracy. Because The Zebra itself is not an insurance agency, it's not biased toward sending customers to one company or another.

As of 2019, The Zebra provided over 1,800 car insurance products from more than 200 national insurers.

== Research ==
The Zebra analyzes more than 83 million car insurance rates to compile its annual State of Insurance report. The report covers topics including how much the average American is paying for their coverage, the states where rates are rising or falling, the most and least expensive cars to insure, how much a ticket raises drivers’ insurance rates, and other variables that affect insurance rates such as marital status, age, credit score and education.

The Zebra has published additional reports on topics that impact the insurance industry, such as:

- Distracted Driving Report: This report reveals car insurance companies raise penalty for distracted driving 10,000%, proving that getting caught using a cell phone while driving is getting exponentially more expensive as car insurance companies are just beginning to penalize drivers for distracted driving.
- Gender-Based Pricing Report: This report uncovered that women now pay more than men for car insurance in 25 states (even though men are riskier drivers).
- Car Technology Report: In this report, The Zebra looked into why tech that makes your car safer won't lower your insurance rates and revealed that despite proven safety and security benefits, new in-car safety and anti-theft technology features save drivers less than 1% on car insurance.
- Marijuana Report: The Zebra presented a survey of drivers in the U.S. who have access to recreational marijuana and found that 60% of drivers who use marijuana in legal states drive under the influence.

== Leadership ==
Joshua Dziabiak joined after the financing in 2013 as COO/CMO. Keith Melnick, previously President at Kayak, was named CEO of The Zebra in 2017.

The company's CTO is Meetesh Karia.

After leading the company as CEO for 6 years, Lyons served as chairman of the board. He left in 2018, now serving on the board of CASA and as EIR at Bill Wood Ventures.

== See also ==
- Disruptive innovation
- Metasearch engine
- Online marketplace
