= MoneySuperMarket =

British price comparison business

MONY Group plc
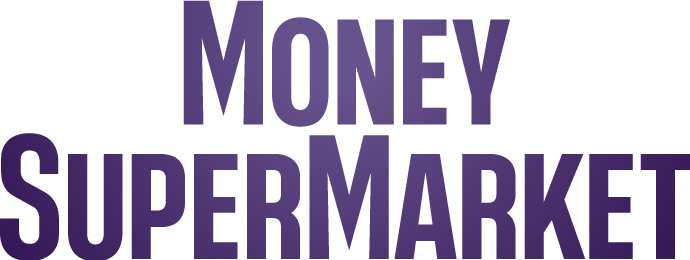
- Formerly: Moneysupermarket.com Group plc (July 2007–May 2024); Moneysupermarket.com Group Limited (June–July 2007)
- Type: Public
- Traded as: LSE: MONY; FTSE 250 component
- ISIN: GB00B1ZBKY84
- Founded: 1993
- Founder: Simon Nixon
- Headquarters: Ewloe, UK
- Key people: Robin Freestone (Chairman of the board); Peter Duffy (CEO)
- Revenue: ▲£446.3 million (2025)
- Operating income: ▲£117.4 million (2025)
- Net income: ▼£79.9 million (2025)
- Website: moneysupermarket.com

MONY Group plc, trading as MoneySuperMarket, is a British company which specialises in technology-led money-saving platforms including several price comparison websites. The company enables consumers to compare prices on a range of products, including energy, car insurance, home insurance, travel insurance, mortgages, credit cards and loans. The company's subsidiaries include the price comparison websites MoneySuperMarket, Travel Supermarket, IceLolly, and Decision Tech, along with the cashback website Quidco and the Moneysavingexpert advice website. MONY Group is listed on the London Stock Exchange and is a constituent of the FTSE 250 Index.

== History ==
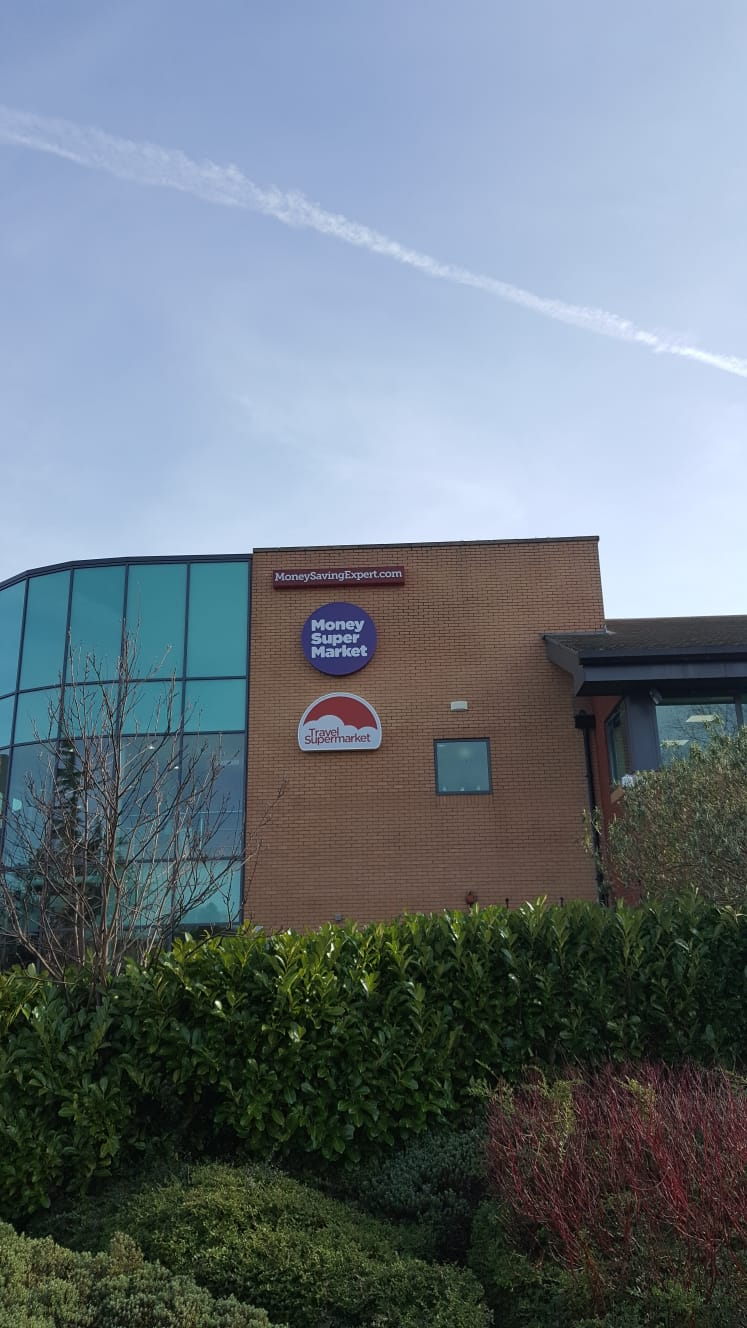
Office in Ewloe, Wales

The company was founded by Simon Nixon and Duncan Cameron as a mortgage subscription business in 1987. It expanded rapidly during the mid-1990s. In the late 1990s, Nixon realised that the introduction of easy access to the internet would create opportunities for web-based businesses. He launched a website which facilitated price comparison for personal loans and credit cards which was marketed as a business to consumer business.

As the web-based business expanded to offer mortgage comparisons, Nixon decided to close the traditional mortgage subscription business which at the time was known as Mortgage 2000. As Cameron had been recruited to run the IT side of Mortgage 2000, there was no longer a full-time role for him and, from 2002, he simply became a silent partner in the business.

In 2000, Moneysupermarket announced the launch of Travelsupermarket.com. The website operated in the same way as Moneysupermarket, but compared prices for the travel market. The goal of Travelsupermarket was to provide transparent pricing, describing the exact differences between the different price structures being offered.

In 2002, the company appeared in The Sunday Times' Fast Track 100, and it was also the 80th fastest growing tech business in the United Kingdom in the period from 2000 to 2002. In 2003, Nixon was declared Entrepreneur of the Year at the National Business Awards.

In June 2007, The Guardian reported that Moneysupermarket was processing 52% of all the price comparisons in the UK. However, the reporter also pointed out that, in the case of household and car insurance, price comparison websites such as Moneysupermarket rarely include all products on the market and that price comparisons are consequently incomplete. Also, in June 2007, Nixon acquired Cameron's 47% stake in the business for £162 million.

Later that month, the company was the subject of an initial public offering on the London Stock Exchange at a price that valued the business at circa £1 billion. It was one of the largest tech flotations in the United Kingdom to have taken place for many years.

In 2012, Moneysupermarket announced the acquisition of MoneySavingExpert.com for £87 million. Following the acquisition, MoneySavingExpert remained editorially independent and its founder, Martin Lewis, remained as the chief editor of the platform. The company announced in 2015 that Lewis would be reducing his overall holding in Moneysupermarket.com to 1.5%.

In October 2016, the company announced that Mark Lewis, a former retail director at John Lewis, would take over as CEO from Peter Plumb in May 2017. In September 2020, in another change in management, Peter Duffy took over as CEO.

On 19 October 2021, Moneysupermarket announced it was acquiring Maple Syrup Media, the owners of the UK cashback website, Quidco.com. The sale amount is reported to be £87 million in cash, plus an additional £14 million as a deferred payment.

On 2 May 2024, MoneySuperMarket Group plc announced it was changing its corporate holding name to MONY Group, a decision made to reflect the Group had "evolved" in recent years beyond the original price comparison website. This change came into effect on 20 May 2024.

== Operations ==
=== MoneySuperMarket ===
MoneySuperMarket, which specialises in financial services, was in 2016 the largest comparison website in the UK by revenue.

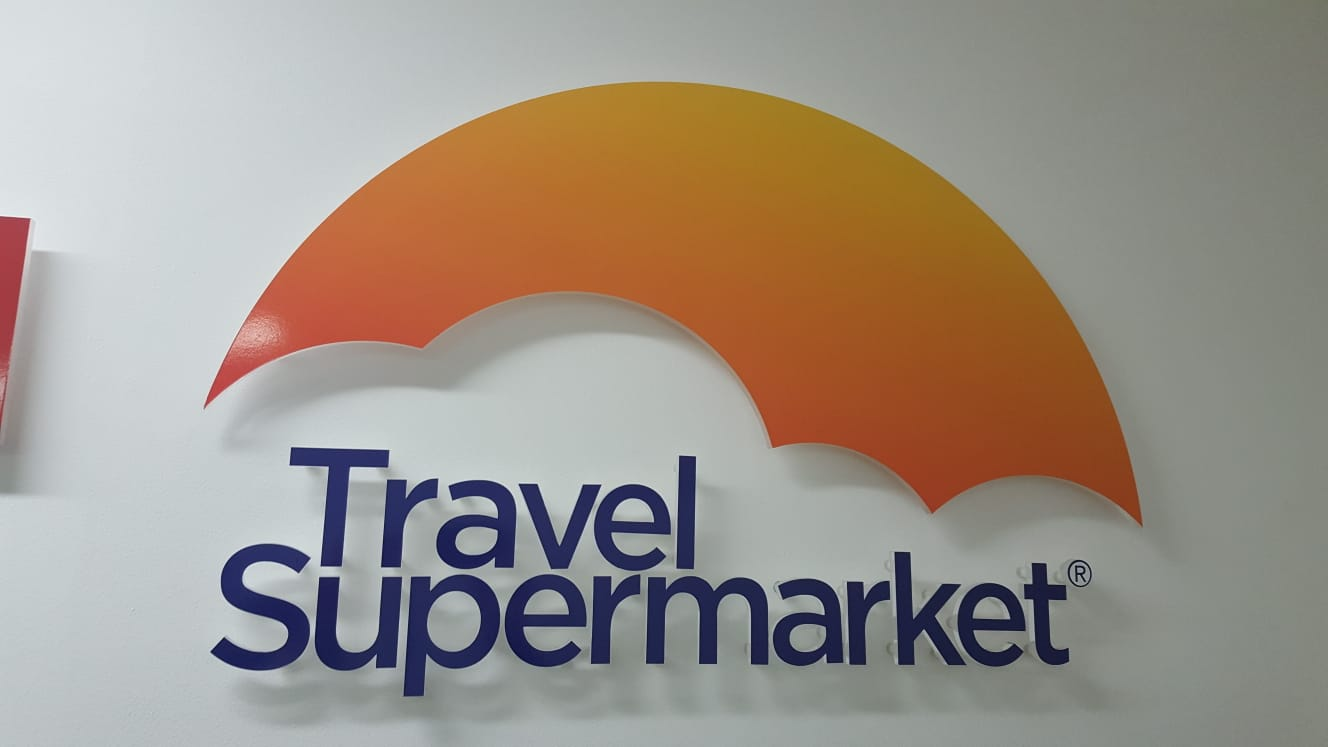
Travel Supermarket logo

=== TravelSupermarket ===
The TravelSupermarket.com website, specialising in price comparison for package holidays, was established in 2004 as a sister site to Moneysupermarket.com.

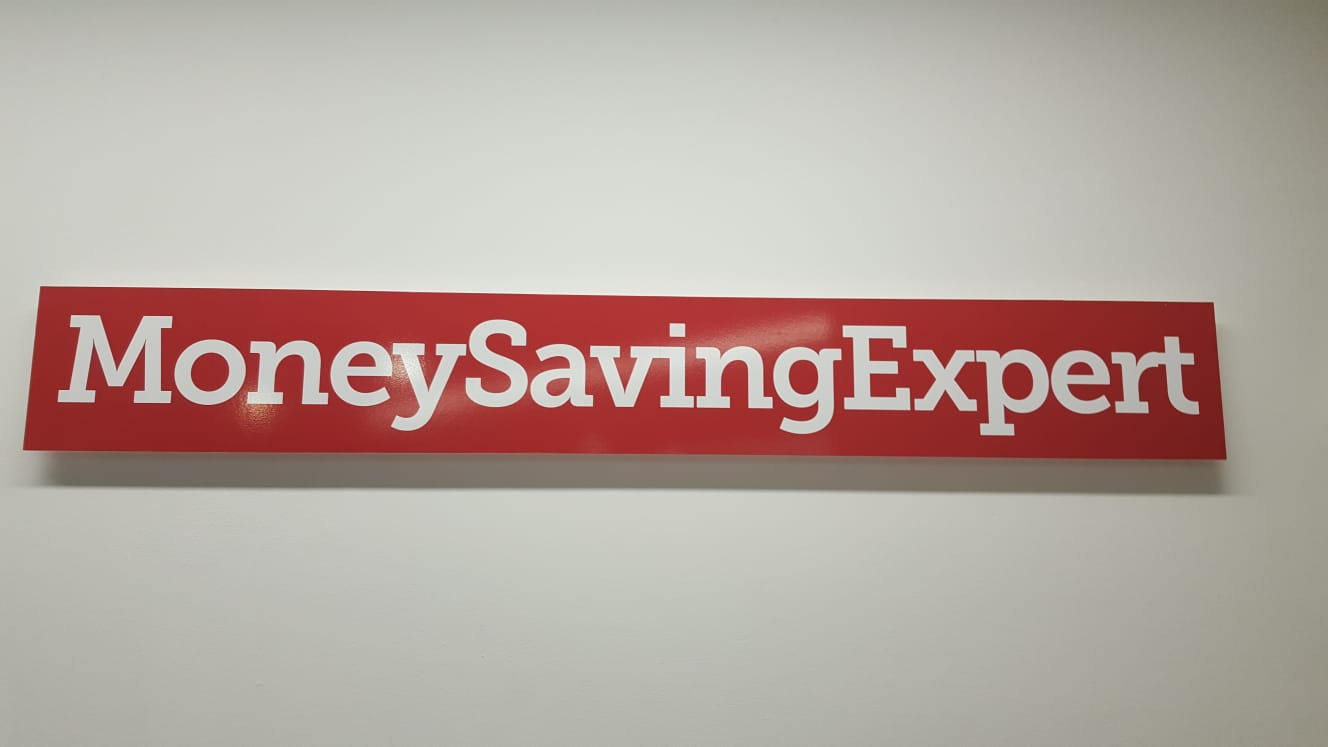
Money Saving Expert logo

Like Moneysupermarket, TravelSupermarket's television advertisements have become known for their humour and use of celebrities. Previous ads featured comedian Omid Djalili, former Labour MP John Prescott and X Factor stars Jedward.

=== MoneySavingExpert ===
MoneySavingExpert.com, established by financial journalist Martin Lewis in 2003 to provide financial information to consumers, was bought by Moneysupermarket in 2012. The subsidiary also operates a Cheap Energy Club which monitors users' energy tariffs to help them find the cheapest available.

== Research ==
Moneysupermarket has a research arm: it has released statistics suggesting that the UK wastes £1.6 billion on energy bills each year from leaving devices such as televisions on standby. It has also found that the cost of TV subscriptions can be reduced dramatically through streaming services. In February 2018, the group's research found that 20 per cent of people in Scotland had never switched energy provider.

== Advertisements ==
A 2015 advert featuring a male character named Dave strutting in high heels garnered controversy

In 2010, adverts featured comedian Omid Djalili as the character of "HaggleHero". From 2011 to 2013 the company's adverts included a man surfing on an inflatable crocodile, a man in a jungle with gorillas and a man going into space. In August 2013 a new advert was launched, featuring "Bill" with an army of cats whilst a spokesman, played by James Lance, referred to Bill as "so Moneysupermarket".

In January 2014, Snoop Dogg and his song "Who Am I (What's My Name)" were featured in a new ad. In August of the same year, the "Epic Elephunk" walked around Manhattan with "Graeme" riding on its back; again he was described as "so Money Supermarket"; the soundtrack was "Word Up!" by Cameo.

In January 2015, another advertising campaign was launched featuring a man named Dave (played by Michael Van Schoik), walking down a street in L.A, dressed in a shirt, suit jacket, denim hot pants and high heels. He alongside two other people, struts confidently to the song "Don't Cha" by the Pussycat Dolls, while showing off his prominent rear to stunned onlookers, including Sharon Osbourne. It was later revealed by the Advertising Standards Authority in the UK to be the most complained about advert in 2015 with 1,513 complaints. In their ruling, the ASA found that whilst it may be distasteful to some, it did not judge the advert was offensive and the complaint was not upheld.

In July 2015, another advert was launched. It shows a chubby construction worker named Colin (played by Kyle McIntire). He dances, gyrates, does a worm dance and a split in front of his co-workers and the bemused office staff at the other building. The song featured in this advert is "Just a Little" by British pop group Liberty X. At the end of the advert, he also swings on a wrecking ball (a reference to the video of Miley Cyrus' Wrecking Ball).

In January 2016, another TV campaign by agency Mother was launched featuring a bodyguard named Gary. The song featured in the advert is "Big Bad Wolf" by Duck Sauce, an American-Canadian DJ duo.

In April 2016, another advert was released. It showed all three of the 'epic' people having a dance off in a car park. The song featured in the advert is "Worth It" by Fifth Harmony featuring Kid Ink. The ad premiered during the first break of Britain's Got Talent. It was revealed in an article by The Telegraph that in 2016 three of Moneysupermarket's adverts made the top 10 list of most complained about commercials in the United Kingdom, a list produced by the Advertising Standards Authority. Despite the potential negativity, the company's new Chief Executive stated that he believed the 2,500 complaints showed their adverts had people talking about the brand.

In September 2016, an advert featuring the hashtag 'epicsquads' was released. This time featuring strutting businessman "Dave", his builder rival "Colin", and gangs of each of their similarly-attired friends, all set to "Dirrty" by Christina Aguilera.

In March 2017, another advert featuring Skeletor dancing to the song "Fame" by Irene Cara and also featuring He-Man was released, the advert returned yet again in October 2018. Later, in August 2017, the brand released another advert, this time featuring Skeletor and He-Man dancing to the song "Time of My Life" from the film "Dirty Dancing" with He-Man.

In March 2018, an advert featuring Action Man dancing to the song "Finally" by CeCe Peniston was released.

In March 2019, a new campaign, in tandem with a new logo, was launched featuring a parachuting cat and was narrated by comedian and voice over artist Matt Berry.

In June 2020, a new campaign was released, still featuring Berry on narration duties, but this time, focusing on a "money calm" bull who remains calm even in chaotic situations, a play on the idiom "bull in a China shop".
