= Miguel Salis =

Spanish businessman (1958–2021)

Miguel Salis Canosa
- Born: 1958; Leon, Spain
- Died: 3 December 2021; Bagergue, Valle de Aran Spain
- Occupations: Partner and CEO of Eolia Renovables

Miguel Salis (1958 – 3 December 2021) was a Spanish entrepreneur and the founder of Eolia Renovables, where he was partner and CEO. He was also a co-founder and former vice-chairman and CFO of Jazztel PLC and vice-chairman of Ya.com. Previously, Salis worked at Salomon Brothers, Lehman Brothers and Midland Bank.

Salis was an Industrial Engineer from the Polytechnic University of Madrid, where he specialised in power technologies. He later went on to receive an MBA from Columbia University in New York, where he graduated in 1984. He began his career as an investment banker at Lehman Brothers, Solomon Brothers and Citicorp, after which he joined serial entrepreneur Martin Varsavsky to found Jazztel in 1999. Salis worked at Jazztel until 2003, when he joined Varsavsky's holding company Jazzya as a director. Here, Salis incubated and launched the project of Eolia Renovables (founded 2007), bringing on board the Spanish investment bank Nmas1. Eolia Renovables is now one of the European leaders in the wind and solar power sector, with operations in six countries and operating capacity of 434 MW.
