= Varsavsky =

Varsavsky is a surname. Notable people with the surname include:

- Carlos Varsavsky (1933–1983), Argentine astrophysicist
- Martín Varsavsky (born 1960), Argentine businessperson
- Oscar Varsavsky (1920–1976), Argentine mathematician and science administrator
