= Sonico =

Sonico may refer to:

- Sonico, Lombardy, a comune in the province of Brescia, Lombardy, Italy
- Sonico.com, a social networking service
- Super Sonico, a mascot of the Japanese software company Nitroplus
