= NESPOT =

NESPOT is a commercial subscription-based public Wi-Fi network run by Korea Telecom. It is by far the biggest such network in South Korea, much like BT Openzone and T-Mobile in Europe and North America. Currently they have an infrastructure compatible with the 802.11g protocol

Access to NESPOT requires the use of a Windows Executable file Presumably due to the use of nonstandard encryption schemes popular in Korea. Besides using a Windows executable, there is also the option of registering a MAC address, allowing access for systems not running Microsoft Windows
