= Miguel Solís =

Miguel Solís may refer to:

- Miguel Solís (baseball) (1906-unknown), Cuban baseball player
- Miguel Solís (footballer) (born 1981), Colombian footballer
- Miguel Solís (racewalker), Mexican racewalker; see 2005 Pan American Race Walking Cup

== See also ==
- Miguel Salis (born 1958), Spanish entrepreneur
