= Goggo Network =

Autonomous mobility networks company

- Company type: Private
- Traded as: Nasdaq: LVRAU
- Industry: Transport
- Founded: 2018; 7 years ago, in Madrid, Spain
- Founder: Martín Varsavsky and Yasmine Fage
- Headquarters: Berlin, Germany
- Area served: Europe
- Key people: Martín Varsavsky (CEO); Yasmine Fage (COO)
- Parent: Levere Holdings
- Website: goggo.network

Goggo Network is a company with headquarters in Madrid, Berlin and Paris, dedicated to the creation of autonomous mobility networks in different cities in Europe. It was founded in 2018 as "105. "Media" Vermögensverwaltungsgesellschaft mbH" by Springer SE and changed to 'goggo network' 14.11.2019. Change to Martin Varsavsky as CEO in February 2020. Yasmine Fage serves as COO.

Goggo Network's goal is to operate fleets of autonomous vehicles in Europe and help country governments create a licensing system for the operation of self-driving vehicles. In September 2021, the company launched the initial tests of the first self-driving food truck to circulate on the streets of Spain, and later that year it presented an autonomous delivery robot in collaboration with the company Glovo, which began operations in Madrid in February 2022.

== History ==
=== Beginnings and first round of investment ===
The company was created in July 2018 in Madrid by entrepreneur Martín Varsavsky, recognized for having founded companies such as Jazztel, Eolia, Overture Life, Barter Energy and VAS Ventures, and by Yasmine Fage, a former associate at the consulting firm McKinsey & Company. In light of the modification of the mobility law concerning the regulation of self-driving vehicles in France (2019), the company decided to start operations in that country. In January 2020, Goggo Network managed to raise €24 million from investors Axel Springer and SoftBank in a Series A funding round. These funds were used to start work in Germany and strengthen its presence in Spain and France.

=== Launching of SPAC and start-up of the first autonomous Food Truck ===
In March 2021, it was announced that SPAC Levere Holdings, formed by Goggo Network and led by Varsavsky and Fage, would be listed on the NASDAQ stock market under the symbol LVRAU. In the deal, which raised $250 million, Deutsche Bank and Citigroup acted as lead guarantors. A month later, French media announced the company's participation in the 5G Open Road project, a government initiative aiming to "deploy a 5G network on the Plateau de Saclay to define a complete model for connected mobility services in different configurations".

In June 2021, the company presented a prototype of an autonomous food truck at the Viva Technology 2021 trade show, held in Paris. In September of the same year, the company announced at the Mobility, Home and Sustainable Cities Fair in Madrid the launch of "Goggo Cart", the first self-driving food truck to circulate in Spain, and the Calle Real in the municipality of Las Rozas de Madrid was chosen to launch the pilot of the project.

In February 2022, the Spanish newspaper La Razón announced that the project had traveled more than 50 kilometers, at a speed of 5 kilometers per hour, and that in that month there had been more than 1,000 vehicle interactions with pedestrians, with the aim of purchasing food products transported in the car. According to Yasmine Fage, these vehicles "can detect and avoid obstacles such as traffic lights, pedestrians, cyclists or other vehicles", through "the use of cameras and a combination of artificial intelligence with advanced algorithms". She also stated that the Goggo Cart can store up to one hundred objects and hold a total of 400 liters of capacity.

=== Partnership with Glovo and present day ===
In November 2021, the company participated in the Trafic 2021 event held at the IFEMA consortium in Madrid. The event was attended by more than eighty entities in order to discuss relevant issues on mobility issues. Later that year, Goggo Network partnered with Spanish home delivery company Glovo to launch a pilot program of delivery robots in Madrid's Salamanca district.

Spanish newspaper ABC reported that in February 2022 the autonomous delivery robot service would be launched in the Spanish capital, which has the ability to move along sidewalks at the speed of a pedestrian, pick up orders at designated stores and deliver them to the customer's home. This robot reaches a maximum speed of five kilometers per hour, and has twelve hours of autonomy. The same newspaper announced the implementation of the Goggo Cart food truck in the Cuatro Torres Business Area in Madrid.

In an interview with the newspaper El Economista in February 2022, Fage said that if the smart delivery phase is successful, the company will aim to implement self-driving vehicles designed for passenger transport. In March 2022, the COO participated in the ANFAC Forum on mobility, where she expressed the need for a clear regulatory framework on autonomous mobility in Spain. In an interview with the online newspaper El Español, the company said that by 2023 it is likely that there will be "a fleet of autonomous delivery robots circulating in Spain".
