= RecargaPay =

Brazilian mobile payment app

RecargaPay do Brasil Serviços de Informática Ltda.
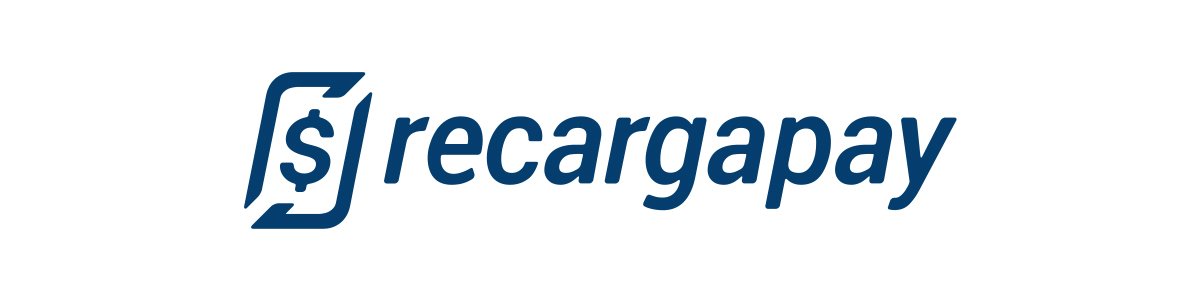
- Company type: Private
- Website type: Mobile Money Wallet
- Available in: Portuguese
- Founded: November 1, 2010; 16 years ago
- Headquarters: São Paulo, Brazil
- Area served: Brazil
- Founders: Rodrigo Teijeiro; Álvaro Teijeiro; Gustavo Victorica
- Key people: Rodrigo Teijeiro (CEO); Álvaro Teijeiro (CTO); Gustavo Victorica (COO); Xavier Ibanez (CFO); Diego Belbussi (CMO)
- Industry: Internet
- Products: Credit card (for individuals and businesses) Personal Loans Pix (instant payment system) Pix with credit card Earnings of 110% of the CDI (Interbank Deposit Certificate) Bill and boleto payments Business account Payment link Card reader (Maquininha) Tap to Pay Mobile phone top-up Transportation card top-up
- Employees: + 600 (2024) (March 22, 2024)
- Website: recargapay.com.br
- Registration: Required
- Users: Over 10 million users
- Current status: Active

RecargaPay is a Brazilian mobile payments app company that provides online financial services for banked and unbanked individuals nationwide. It was founded in 2010 by Rodrigo Teijeiro, Alvaro Teijeiro, and Gustavo Victorica. The company has over 600 employees based mainly in São Paulo, Buenos Aires, Argentina, and Miami, USA, and has reported over 10 million active users.

The platform operates as a digital wallet, allowing users to perform a range of financial transactions, including mobile phone and public transport card top-ups, as well as bill and invoice payments. In addition, the service provides options for applying for credit cards and personal loans directly through the application.

== History ==
The company was founded in 2010 by brothers Rodrigo and Álvaro Teijeiro, currently CEO and CTO respectively, and Gustavo Victorica, current COO.

Recarga.com operated in Latin America and in the United States under the ownership of Fnbox, a technology holding company that manages various online businesses. By August 2012, the company had processed transactions in six countries for 110,000 customers across more than twenty mobile carriers.

In 2013, Fnbox began a process of dismemberment to focus exclusively on the mobile recharge business. Consequently, Recarga.com became RecargaPay, and diversified its product offering.

Since its launch, RecargaPay has recorded over 30 million app downloads and raised more than US$120 million through multiple funding rounds. Notable investors include the International Finance Corporation (IFC), IDB Invest, and Fuel Venture Capital.

RecargaPay is authorised by the Central Bank of Brazil as a Payment Institution (electronic money issuer), Direct Credit Society (SCD, licensed October 2021), and Credit, Financing, and Investment Society (SCFI, licensed in 2024).

== Services ==
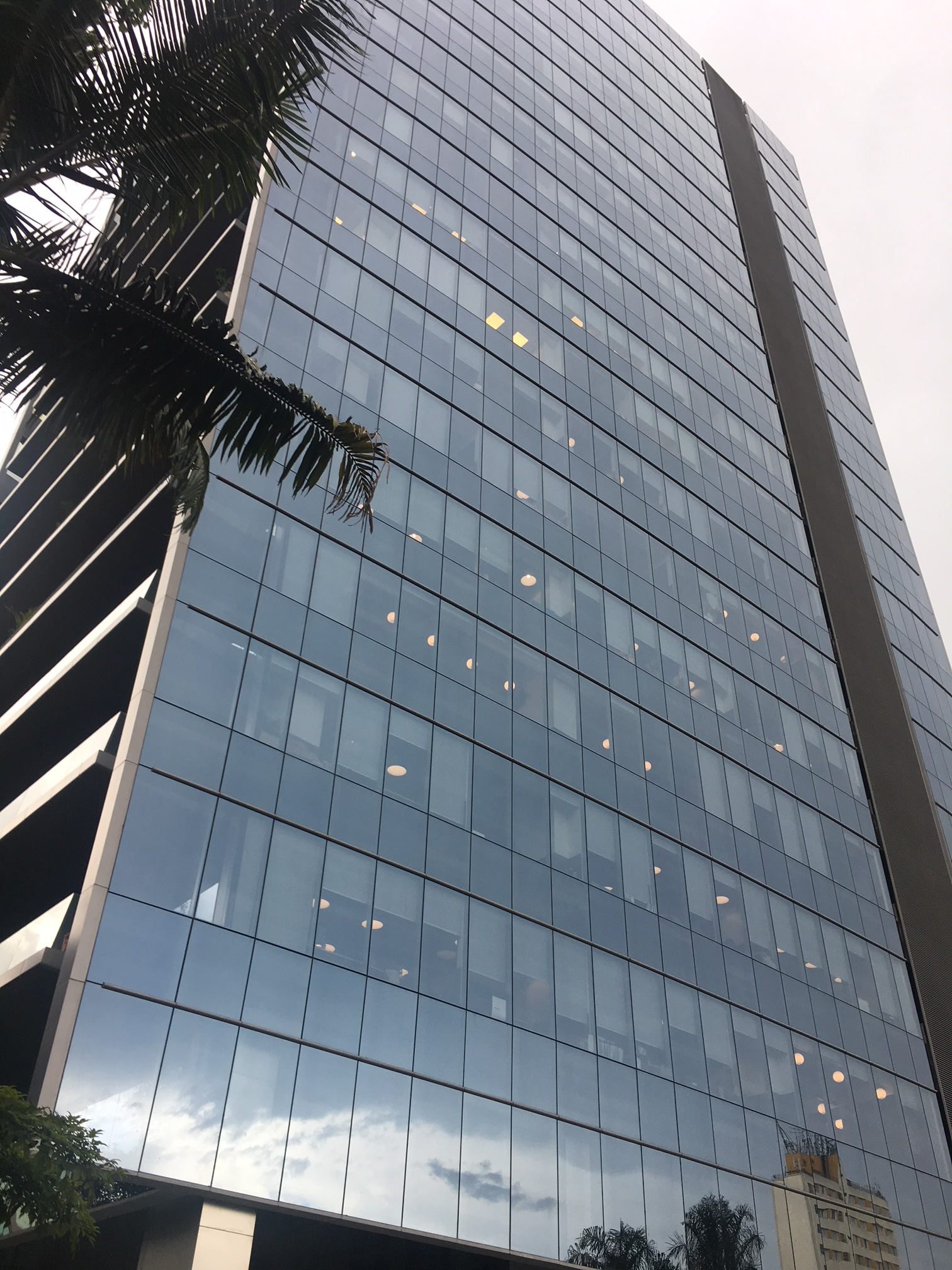
RecargaPay's headquarters in São Paulo, Brazil.

RecargaPay allows payments through credit card, debit card, PIX, or its wallet which can be loaded via Pix or credit card.

Merchants can resell RecargaPay's services to attract customers, offering mobile phone recharges and bill payments. The business account also provides additional features, such as credit cards with cashback and payment collection methods, including payment links and tap-to-pay options.

Cell phone recharges

RecargaPay supports multiple carriers: Claro, TIM, Vivo, Oi, Correios, Sercomtel, Algar, and Surf Telecom. It offers scheduled recharges, and an Offline Recharge option for those without credits.

Transport card recharge

The service covers transportation cards from various cities, such as Bilhete Único and Cartão TRI. The company offers this service to over 30 transportation cards through the country, reaching more than 60 cities.

Personal Loans

RecargaPay also offers a personal loan service through its app. Eligible users can access pre-approved credit directly via the app, with a simplified application process and installment payment options. Loan availability is subject to credit analysis and the terms and conditions established by the company.

Credit Cards

RecargaPay issues credit cards in standard, Black, and Platinum versions. It also offers a “limite garantido” card (a secured-limit product), in which the spending limit is backed by a user deposit and defined through the app. Since May 2025, the RecargaPay credit card can be added to Apple Pay for online and contactless payments.

Tap to Pay

Tap to Pay allows a smartphone to accept contactless card payments, so merchants do not need a separate card terminal. Users sign up through the RecargaPay app. The company also offers Pix payments funded by credit card, in which a merchant receives funds through Pix while the customer pays in instalments within their card limit.

== Accolades ==
In 2016, RecargaPay was nominated in two categories of the Latam Founders Awards: Most Innovative Company and Best B2C Company, losing in both nominations for Pipefy and Nubank, respectively. At the ReclameAqui Awards, RecargaPay received honors for four consecutive years: it achieved third place for Online Payments two times, the second place for Financial Solutions and the fifth place for Digital Payment Method.

Year	Award	Category	Result
2020	ReclameAqui	Digital Payment Methods	5th Place
2019	ReclameAqui	Financial Solutions	2nd Place
2018	ReclameAqui	Online Payments	3rd Place
2017	ReclameAqui	Online Payments	3rd Place
2016	LATAM Founders	Best B2C Company	Nominated
2016	LATAM Founders	Most Innovative Company	Nominated
