= BT MyPlace =

BT MyPlace is a service that dynamically delivers content and information to people, based on their personal preferences and location. The location-based service is available over BT’s outdoor Wi-Fi network in central London and the West End. It uses the BT Openzone outdoor Wi-Fi network in Westminster.

The service provides residents, visitors and commuters with information on facilities and entertainment in the Westminster borough, and well as travel and residential from www.transportdirect.info and www.Westminster.gov.uk.

Content is divided into discrete sections of entertainment, such as Nights Out, Tourist Day and City Weekend. This content is provided by a number of sources including Time Out, LoveTheatre, Kodak, Top Table, Discovery Audio LondonPass and audible.co.uk.

Once registered to the service, individuals can personalize the site to remember preferences, such as types of food and styles of music. The site then sends the user recommendations based on their preferences and search criteria – for example restaurants, museums and theatres.

The technology behind the BT MyPlace service was developed by iome

Backing BT MyPlace is a joint venture by Westminster City Council and BT, Intel, Cisco and iome. The service is free but supported financially by advertising.

== Sources ==
- http://www.btmyplace.com
- thisislondon.co.uk
- http://www.webuser.co.uk/news/news.php?id=276269
- https://www.ispreview.co.uk/news/EkFFyyZVVyIbfkllXn.html
- http://www.pocket-lint.co.uk/news/news.phtml/21958/22982/bt-myplace-pocket-concierge-service.phtml
- https://www.computerweekly.com/Articles/2009/02/03/234578/bt-openzone-gives-londoners-location-based-info.htm
- http://www.pcadvisor.co.uk/news/index.cfm?newsid=110375&
- http://www.sourcewire.com/releases/rel_display.php?relid=LmXEL
- http://www.mobile-ent.biz/news/32497/Localised-wi-fi-content-service-for-Londoners
- http://www.telecompaper.com/news/article.aspx?cid=656192
- http://www.computing.co.uk/computing/news/2235645/west-visitors-free-wi
- http://ecommerce-journal.com/news/12904_bt_presents_first_free_personal_wi_fi_service_in_london
