= Rodrigo Teijeiro =

Argentine technology entrepreneur

- Born: Buenos Aires, Argentina
- Education: University of Southern California; University of San Andrés
- Occupation: Entrepreneur
- Years active: 2002–present
- Known for: Sonico; RecargaPay

Rodrigo Teijeiro is an Argentine technology entrepreneur who is the founder and chief executive officer of RecargaPay, a leading mobile payments company in Brazil.

== Early life and education ==
Teijeiro was born in Buenos Aires. When he was four years old he moved with his parents to the U.S. and they lived there for five years.

Teijeiro began his entrepreneurial journey when he was in school, earning money by buying and selling stuff there. He then used the funds to open his first E-Trade account in 1997. From there, he started day trading and, in one year and a half, his valuation went from $5,000 to $100,000.

At the age of 18 he started studying Economics at the University of San Andrés (Argentina).

At the age of 20 he raised $300,000 and launched a website for Latin American indie bands to promote themselves online. The company grew to the point where it had 25 people working in it. In 2001, due to NASDAQ's collapse and the impossibility to raise more capital, he had to close the company.

In 2001 he decided to continue his education in the U.S. enrolling at the University of Southern California to pursue a bachelor's degree in Business Administration.

== Career ==
In 2002 Teijeiro founded Fnbox, a Latin American company builder organized as a holding company that launched and managed various online businesses.

Fnbox's first subsidiary, TarjetasTelefonicas.com (known as Cloncom.com in the US market), was launched by Rodrigo in September 2002. TarjetasTelefonicas is a telecommunications company that offers a wide range of products such as prepaid calling cards, pinless and rechargeable cards, PC to phone services and prepaid wireless cards.

With the purpose of growing its global audience, between 2003 and 2007, Fnbox launched Cumplealerta.com (a birthdate alert service), Tarjetasbubba.com and TuPostal.com (two E-card services) and Flodeo.com (an image hosting service).

In July 2007 Fnbox launched Sonico.com, a free-access social networking website oriented toward the Latin American audiences. As an early mover in the Latin American social space, Sonico registered 4.4 million users in its first year. Fnbox immediately raised $4.3 million in financing from venture capital and angel investors and brought Sonico to Brazil, the largest consumer market in Latin America.

One year after its foundation, Sonico had a staff of 88 people and claimed to be adding some 110,000 new users every day with more than 20 million registered users in total.

In 2010 Fnbox bought Cupónica.com, a coupon site to offer daily deals to its customers, and launched Datam.com, an online advertising service to help businesses reach targeted audiences, and Winkal.com, an entertainment platform.

In August 2014, after reaching 55 million registered users, Sonico was sold to Match.com.

RecargaPay, also founded by Rodrigo Teijeiro and incubated by Fnbox, was launched on February 1, 2010, as a mobile payment platform that allows its users to pay digital services such as prepaid mobile top-ups, bill payments, gift cards, public transport cards and peer-to-peer payments without needing a bank account. As of February 22, 2018, RecargaPay received a total funding of $33,153,334 from various investors such as Martín Varsavsky, Fabrice Grinda and the International Finance Corporation.
