= Fon Wireless =

UK Wi-Fi service company

Fon Wireless Ltd.
- Type: Private
- Industry: Computer hardware Wi-Fi service
- Founded: 2006; 20 years ago
- Founder: Martín Varsavsky
- Defunct: 23 August 2019
- Headquarters: Alcobendas, Community of Madrid, Spain
- Key people: Alex Puregger (CEO)
- Products: Wi-Fi technology and Access
- Number of employees: 150
- Website: fon.com

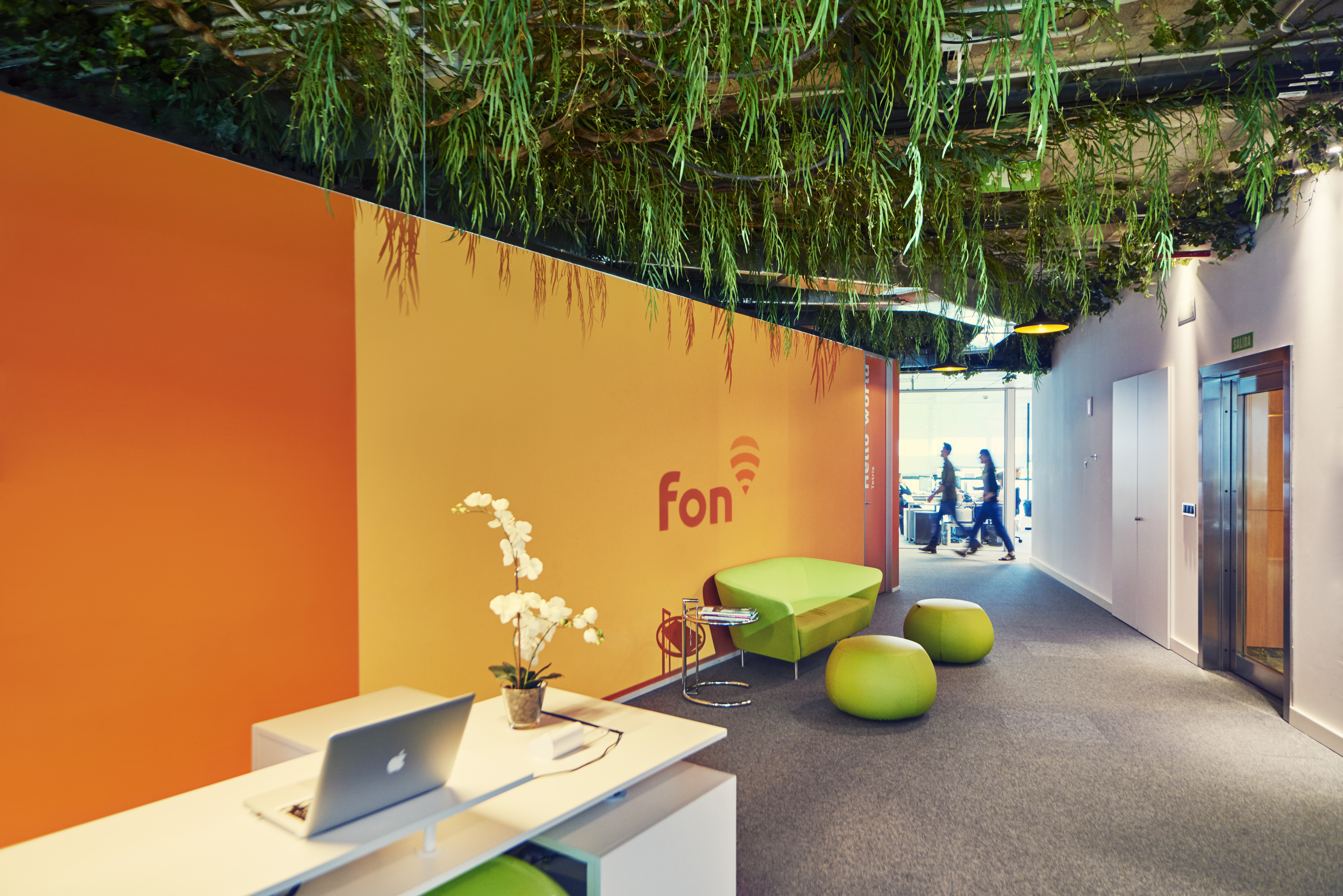
Fon's HQ in Madrid

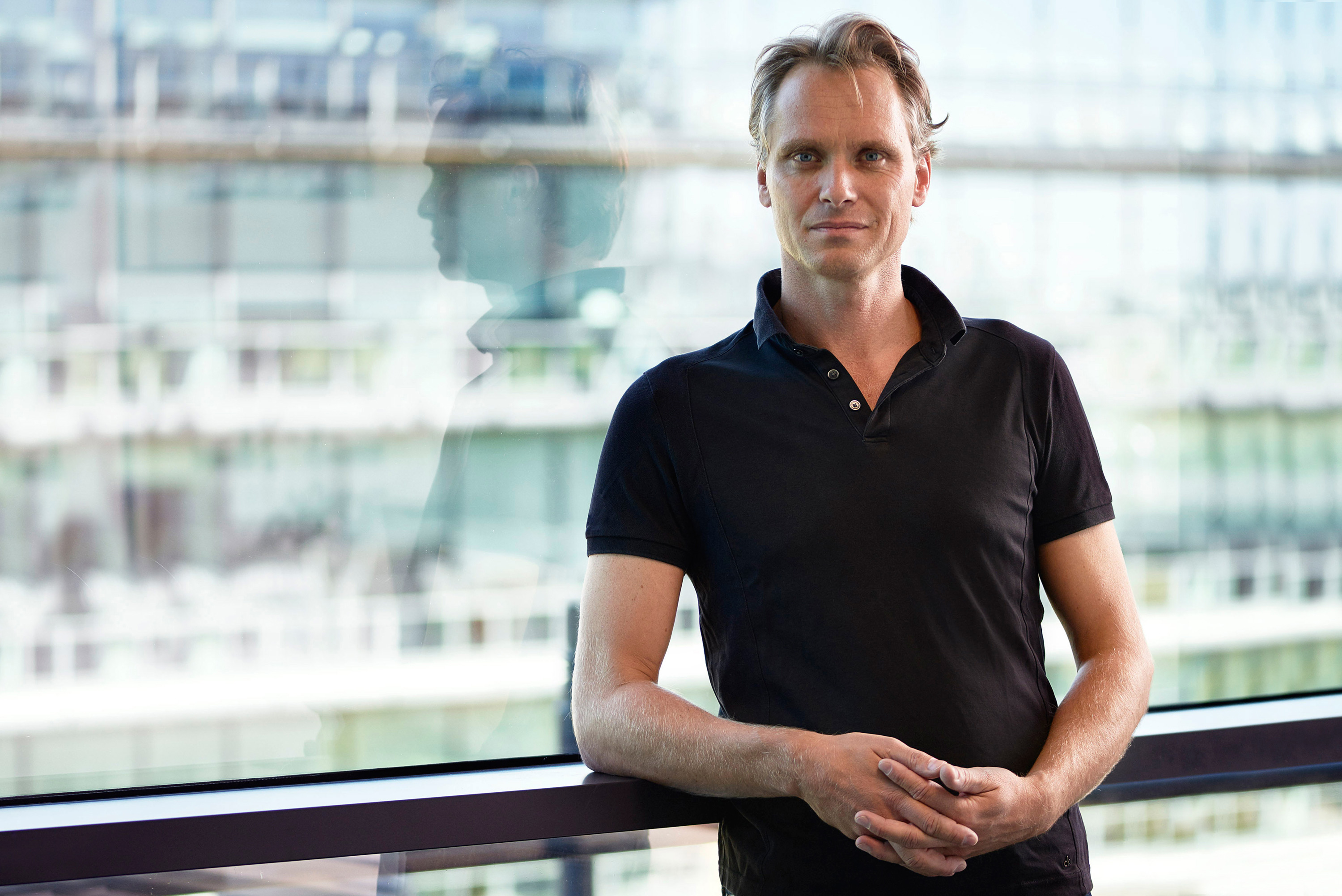
Fon's CEO Alex Puregger

Countries where FON operates

Fon Wireless Ltd. was a for-profit company incorporated and registered in the United Kingdom that provided wireless services. Fon was founded in Madrid, Spain, in 2006, by Martín Varsavsky. Later, the company was headquartered in Bilbao.

Fon started out by building its Wi-Fi network through devices called "foneras". Members, whom the company called "Foneros", agreed to share a part of their bandwidth as a Wi-Fi signal, so that they could connect to other members' hotspots.

As the company evolved, it shifted its focus to working with mobile operators and telecommunication providers, and expanded from deploying residential Wi-Fi to providing access and technology to carriers and service providers. Fon claims to operate a network of over 20 million WiFi hotspots.

In April 2021, Fon was acquired by Agile Content, a provider of over-the-top media services from Barcelona.

== Company ==
=== Subsidiaries and Investors ===
As of 2016, Fon website indicated it had branch offices in the United States, UK, Japan and Brazil. Its investors included Atomico Ventures, Google, Index Ventures, Sequoia Capital Skype, Qualcomm Ventures, Coral Group and telecom partners BT Group and Deutsche Telekom. .

=== Early years ===
Originally, the company intended to create a network for Wi-Fi access wherever customers went. To become a Fon member, users had to buy a special router called “Fonera”. With this router, they agreed to share a part of their bandwidth as a second Wi-Fi signal, in exchange for the right to use other Fon members' hotspots. To achieve this, Fon operated a system of dual access wireless networks. In 2007, Fon's development model shifted to encompass ISPs, and it began to work on creating Wi-Fi community networks with British Telecom (BT) and SFR. In November 2007, Fon deployed its first Wi-Fi rollout and continued using this foundation with more telco partners in the years to come.

=== Middle years ===
Since its initial involvement with ISPs, Fon continued to expand its network through partnerships with local Internet service providers in countries such as Germany, Greece, Japan, and Brazil among others.

=== 2016 ===
In 2016 the company evolved to also include premium networks such as airports, hotels, convention centers, public spaces. Fon also has a technology to allow providers to deliver services to their own customers.

=== Fading out "Fon Wifi Community" ===
In 2020, Deutsche Telekom announced that it would be discontinuing its hotspot sharing service, citing the discontinuation of Fon's service, which had been the underlying platform for the product. In the following three years, all partnerships (for "Fon Wi-Fi Community") were terminated.

The Fonera routers are end-of-life products.

== Hardware and firmware ==
Fon initially operated with a software that could be downloaded for compatible routers, mainly Linksys routers. The firmware for this service was based on OpenWrt. The firmware had been customized specifically for use in the Fon Community, allowing consumers to share their broadband connection and to connect to other Fon Spots around the world.

Fon firmware creates two different Wi-Fi signals: one private and one public.

- Private ('MYPLACE'): encrypted and intended for the owner's private use. Only the Fon Spot owner can access the internal network, computers and files.
- Public ('FON_FREE_INTERNET'): un-encrypted or open, but username and password protected so allowing only registered Fon users to access the Fon Wi-Fi community network, but they cannot access the consumer's private network.

The new 2014 Fonera SIMPL, introduced in February 2014, includes Facebook integration. The owner of the Fonera SIMPL may register their own Facebook account with the device. Once this is done, any user that is a 'Facebook Friend' of the owner is granted access to that Fonera (only).

The 'Fonera Business' takes Facebook integration further by offering free WiFi to customers of a business who are asked to 'Like' the Facebook page for the business in order to gain free WiFi access.

In early 2018, Fon's online shop was closed.

== Partnerships and collaborations ==
Fon claims to have the largest Wi-Fi network in the world, with over 20 million hotspots as of June 2016.

=== Partner for global "Fon Wifi Community" ===
Since 2020, most Fon partnerships had ended or entered a terminating phase.

Partners integrate FON-Wifi in the firmware of the existing customer routers (CPE). Only a few partners sold "Fonera" routers, but with their own company login credentials.

Partnerships for FON Wifi-Community Network
Country	Company	Begin	End	Notes
UK	BT Group (formerly known as British Telecom)	04.10.2007	2020	Continues with its own local Wifi sharing initiative "EE WiFi" (formerly "BTwifi"); Critic: no communication about end of service
France	SFR (formerly known as Neuf Cegetel)	2007	1.5.2023	
Portugal	NOS (formerly known as ZON)	2008	11.03.2020	Continues with its own local Wifi sharing initiative "NOS_Wi-Fi", until 13.08.2021
Japan	SoftBank		01.02.2021	sold Fonera devices.; Since 2010: free "Fonera"-Router for every sold Smartphone
Brazil	Oi	31.10.2011	at least 2022	
Belgium	Proximus (formerly known as Belgacom)	11.2011	2018	Continues with its own local Wifi sharing initiative
Poland	Netia	28.02.2012	2018	
the Netherlands	KPN	2014	1.8.2020.	
Germany	Deutsche Telekom (DT)	06.03.2013	>2021	
Croatia	Hrvatski Telekom (HT) (subsidiary of DT)	Spring 2013	fading out?	sold Fonera device
Greece	Cosmote (subsidiary of DT)	February 2014	slowly closing	
Romania	formerly Telekom Romania (formerly subsidiary of DT)	02.07.2014		
Hungary	Magyar Telekom (subsidiary of DT)	5.4.2016	01.09.2020	(the 17th country that join the Fon network)
South Africa	MWEB ADSL	February 2014	2018	
Australia	Telstra	20.05.2014 launch: 30.06.2015	13.03.2021	
Spain	Vodafone	22.04.2015	31.03.2018	
Italy	Vodafone	22.04.2015	01.04.2023	
and other outdated...

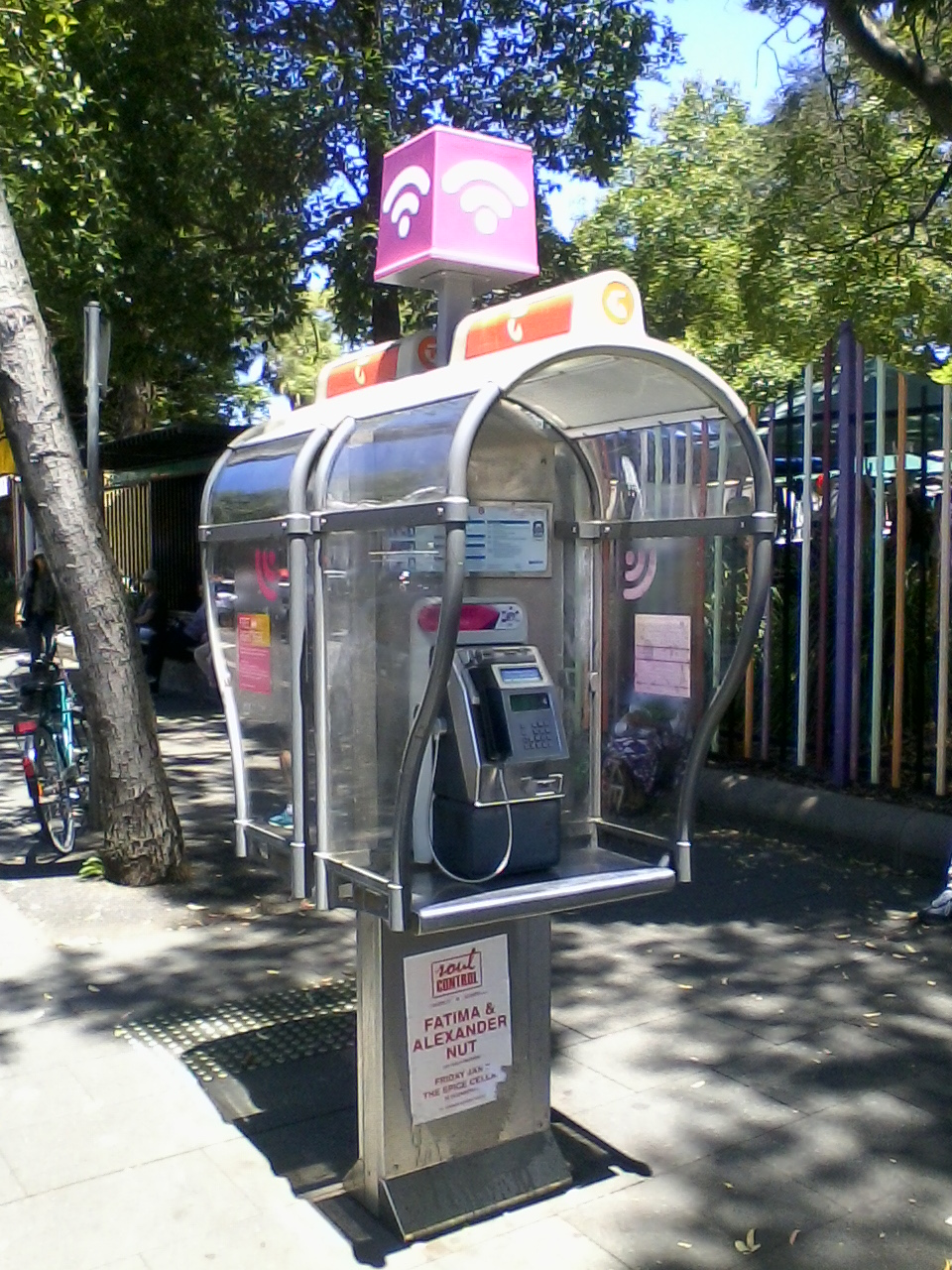
Telstra WiFi Hotspot located on a public telephone in Sydney

=== Awards and recognition ===
- 2008: Awarded “Most Innovative Wireless Broadband Company” for its partnership with BT at the Wireless Broadband Innovation Awards 2008.
- 2013: “Best Next Generation Wi-Fi Device/ Application Award” at the Wireless Broadband Alliance (WBA)’s WiFi Industry Awards 2013 for the new “Fonera: a social WiFi router”.
- 2014: “Best WiFi Innovation Service” at the Wireless Broadband Alliance (WBA)’s WiFi Industry Awards 2014 for the Wifi Music-Player "Gramofon".
- 2014: First European operator to be certified with as a “Premier” participant, the highest level of the Wireless Broadband Alliance's Interoperability Compliance Program (ICP).

== See also ==
- Express Wi-Fi
- Guifi.net
- Meraki
- Eduroam, a similar partnership between universities around the world. Eduroam allows students and staff from participating institutions to connect to hotspots at other participating colleges and universities.
