= Sonico.com =

Defunct social networking service

- Company type: Defunct
- Website type: Social networking
- Available in: Spanish, Portuguese, English
- Founded: July 28, 2007
- Headquarters: Buenos Aires, Argentina
- Area served: Latin America; Spain; Spanish and Portuguese speaking regions
- Founder: Rodrigo Teijeiro CEO
- Employees: 88 (May 2008)
- Advertising: Banner ads, Rich media
- Registration: Required
- Launched: July 28, 2007 (in Buenos Aires, Argentina)
- Current status: Redirected to twoo.com

Sonico was a free-access social networking service oriented toward a Latin American audience.

Users can search and add friends, update their own personal profile, manage their privacy, upload photos and YouTube videos, organize events, challenge other users in 6 multi-player and over 200 single-player games and interact with other people by means of private messages, public comments, photo tags, and a web-based instant messenger.

== History ==
Sonico was launched in July 2007 stressing the importance of having legitimate users rather than a massive number of anonymous accounts. Hence, their motto is "real people, real connections". Unlike other social networks, Sonico has a so-called proactive moderation consisting in a team solely dedicated to check out every new profile and content uploaded to the site. They claim to be able to manage more than 200.000 profiles daily.

According to Sonico's CEO, Rodrigo Teijeiro, Sonico "managed to offer a useful, safe and fun social network, with real users and a regional scope" (Latin America). He assures that usability is the key of their success.

One year after its foundation, Sonico has an 88 people staff and claims to be adding some 110.000 new users every day and reports more than 20 million registered users. It ranks 392 in the Alexa ranking.

A Portuguese version was launched in February 2008, and support in that language has been available since March, 2008. In only a few months, Sonico is already the second favorite social network in Brazil with over 4 million users. The network now is not listed among the 10 more populars social networks in Brasil. Data from Sera Experia confirms that statement:. (Serasa Experia)

== Funding ==
In June 2008, Sonico announced a $4.3 million Series A financing round, led by DN Capital and by various private investors such as Fabrice Grinda (Founder of Aucland, Zingy.com and OLX), Martín Varsavsky (Fon, Ya.com) and Alec Oxenford (DeRemate.com and OLX.com). According to them, the funding will be invested to launch new product enhancements, strengthen its technology infrastructure and keep on recruiting. The company will also expand its international operations by stepping up its presence and leadership along Spanish and Portuguese speaking markets.

== Website ==
Sonico's homepage presents a list of friends most recent activities as well as access to other pages

Sonico allows users to join one or more networks. Networks represent universities, high schools, and regions. By joining a network, users can easily search and get in contact with other people belonging to the same network.

=== PPP or Private/Public/Professional Profiles ===
Sonico has recently launched its new profiles that addresses real life interactions and privacy concerns. You have three different type of profiles:

- A Private Profile that is a personal space for each member within Sonico. It can be personalized with different themes, colors, and backgrounds.
- A Public Profile that is your public space where you can share public content with your fans.
- A Professional Profile that you can use to share with your professional contacts.

This three profiles are complete isolated from each other, allowing sonico users to share content to friends without sharing it with professional colleagues (i.e. party pictures), or share content with the world in the public profile (i.e. holiday pictures)

=== Privacy ===
Sonico remarks the importance of allowing users to have full control over privacy settings related to their accounts. Hence, they have several options to adjust their safety and to designate who may see their information.

=== The Board ===
Every user's profile has its own board, where friends can leave comments and videos.

=== Friends ===
Users can add friends and interact with them by writing on their boards, tagging them on photos, sharing YouTube videos, chatting through the web-based instant messenger, challenging them in 6 multi-player and over 200 single-player games, organizing events and sending them private messages.

=== Groups ===
Group members can participate in its forum, share photos and videos, organize events and post messages. Each group has its own personalized privacy level.

=== Networks ===
Each member can belong to one or more networks which are organized into regions, universities, and high schools. By joining a network, users can easily search and get in touch with people related to them in real life.

=== Private Messages ===
Users can communicate in private through messages. Private Messages are delivered to the user's personal in-box and are saved under a specific category, distinguishing those which were sent by friends from those which came from other users. Users can also send Private Messages to a group of friends.

=== Photos ===
Sonico users can upload an unlimited number of photos and organize them in albums. Photos can be tagged and commented by friends.

=== Videos ===
Users can share any video present on YouTube.

=== Events ===
Sonico users can organize simple and professional events, with customizable visual and privacy options.

=== Games ===
Sonico provides a gaming section with 6 multi-player games and over 200 single-player games. Registered users can recommend games, challenge their friends and share their scores.

=== E-Cards ===
There is an e-cards section where users can choose digital postcards to send to their friends. Postcard sending can also be programmed for future events.

=== Reminders ===
The reminders section reminds users of friend's birthdays and special occasions (editable).
