= Paula Varsavsky =

Argentine writer and journalist

Paula Varsavsky is an Argentine writer and journalist. She was born in Buenos Aires in 1963. Her father was the Argentine astrophysicist Carlos Varsavsky. She is best known for her novel Nadie alzaba la voz which was translated into English by Anne Mclean. Her other books include El resto de su vida, La libertad de los huérfanos, and Las mil caras del autor.
