= Fnbox =

Latin American technology company

Fnbox Ventures, Inc.
- Type: Private
- Industry: Internet
- Founded: Los Angeles, California, United States (2002)
- Founder: Rodrigo Teijeiro
- Headquarters: Buenos Aires, Argentina
- Area served: Worldwide
- Key people: Rodrigo Teijeiro (Founder & CEO); Álvaro Teijeiro (CTO); Gustavo Victorica (CFO)
- Products: Recarga.com; Cuponica.com; Sonico.com; Phonico.com; TarjetasTelefonicas.com; Datam.com
- Number of employees: 85 (2012)
- Website: fnbox.com

Fnbox Ventures, Inc. is a Latin American technology company primarily organized as a holding company that manages various online businesses.

== History of Fnbox ==
Fnbox was founded in June 2002 and raised $6 million investment from venture capital and private investors in 2008. Fnbox has built a series of businesses focused on the Latin American Internet community.

=== 2002 ===
Fnbox was founded in 2002 when CEO & Founder, Rodrigo Teijeiro turned to internet technology to save money on calls to Argentina. Rodrigo started Fnbox and his first subsidiary, TarjetasTelefonicas.com (known as Cloncom.com in the US market), with a development team located in Ukraine. According to Rodrigo, five days after going live the website was selling $500 worth of VoIP minutes.

=== 2004 ===
However, they soon realized that this service was highly exposed to Internet fraud and decided to close down the website and focus on developing a fraud protection system. After two years, with a fraud protection system ready to go, TarjetasTelefonicas.com was re-launched.

=== 2006 ===
In 2006, with a team of developers in place and Facebook spreading like wildfire among college campuses in the US, Fnbox decided to launch a social network customized for Latin American audiences. As an early mover in the Latin American social space, Sonico registered 4.4 million users in its first year. Fnbox immediately raised $4.3 million in financing from venture capital and angel investors and brought Sonico to Brazil, the largest consumer market in Latin America.

=== 2010 ===
By the end of 2010 Fnbox had 75 million users across Tarjetas, Sonico and Recarga, a prepaid phone recharge platform launched that year. It was time to focus on monetizing this traffic. In 2011 Fnbox bought a coupon site to offer daily deals to new and existing customers and launched an online advertising service to help businesses reach targeted audiences.

=== 2012 ===
Moving forward, Fnbox expects to leverage traffic and regional e-commerce know-how to attract Latin America's 355 million mobile phone users, 115 million registered social network users, and $30 billion of expected online shopping for 2013.

== Products and services ==
=== Recarga.com ===
Even though the cost of prepaid service can be 10 times that of traditional service, most users in Latin America use prepaid cell phones because it "attracts clients whose incomes are frequently too erratic to make a monthly payment". Recarga.com is an on-line technology platform that enables end-users to add credits to their prepaid mobile phones in Latin America and the USA. To date they have processed transactions in six countries for 110,000 clients across more than 20 mobile carriers.

=== Cuponica.com ===
Daily Deals reaching more than 75 million Cuponica was purchased by Fnbox in 2011. Cupónica offers consumers daily deals with 50%+ discounts to restaurants, theatres, spas, hotels and entertainment.

=== Sonico.com ===
Founded in July 2007, Sonico is a social network in Latin America that organizes people's lives online into all life categories including: private, public and professional. This social media platform allows individuals, organizations and brands to interact.

=== Phonico.com ===
Fnbox's online calling card business has sold over 750 million minutes, to over 325,000 clients in 150 countries.

=== TarjetasTelefonicas.com ===
Tarjetas Telefónicas is a telecommunications platform and utilizes technologies developed for long distance and mobile phones calls. Tarjetas Telefónicas has developed an in-house fraud control system that process over 80% of all orders automatically (more than 30,000 monthly e-commerce transactions) with lower-than-industry charge-back levels. tarjetastelefonicas.com has sold over 750 million minutes since its start.

=== Datam.com ===
Online advertising and lead generation Datam generated 3.3 million qualified in their first four months. In June 2010 Fnbox launched Datam.

== Management ==
Key management personnel comprise Rodrigo Teijeiro (Founder and CEO), Álvaro Teijeiro (Co-founder and CTO), and Gustavo Victorica (CFO). As of September 2012, Fnbox has over 90 employees, and offices in 4 countries.

== Offices ==
They currently have offices in the following locations:

- Buenos Aires, Argentina
- São Paulo, Brazil
- Miami, United States
- Mexico City, Mexico
