= Ya.com =

Spanish Internet brand

Ya.com or Yacom was a Spanish Internet brand, originally owned by Jazztel. It was created in June 1999 by Martín Varsavsky and a group of former Terra employees within Jazztel Internet Factory, the Internet subsidiary of Jazztel, with the aim of competing in the business of Internet services, content and access portals. The company was renamed Ya.com Internet Factory in March 2000. Following acquisition in 2007, the brand ceased to be used and the division closed in 2012.

== History ==
Through acquisitions, such as Mixmail.com (email), Inforchat.com (chat service), Chueca.com (gay community portal), or through the creation of in-house teams and/or Internet entrepreneurs, such as Viajar.com, Finanzas.com and Supermotor.com, Ya.com built an extensive network. It was also a leader in mobile Internet portals.

In September 2000, Deutsche Telekom's Internet subsidiary T-Online bought 100% of the company for €553 million. T-Online refocused the brand and company on ADSL Internet access, reaching 400,000 customers, and gradually abandoned the portal business.

In 2007, the company was acquired by Orange, the mobile and Internet access subsidiary of France Télécom, for €320 million. Until September 2012, it operated independently under its own brand, targeting a segment of the low-cost Internet access market.

From September 2012, the company stopped marketing ADSL to new customers. Finally, in October 2012, France Télécom merged its ADSL customers with those of its main brand Orange, which meant the complete disappearance of the Yacom division, ending the 13-year history of this brand.
