= Dutakom Wibawa Putra =

Indonesian internet service provider company

Coordinates: 7.27115°S 112.741048°E

PT Dutakom Wibawa Putra

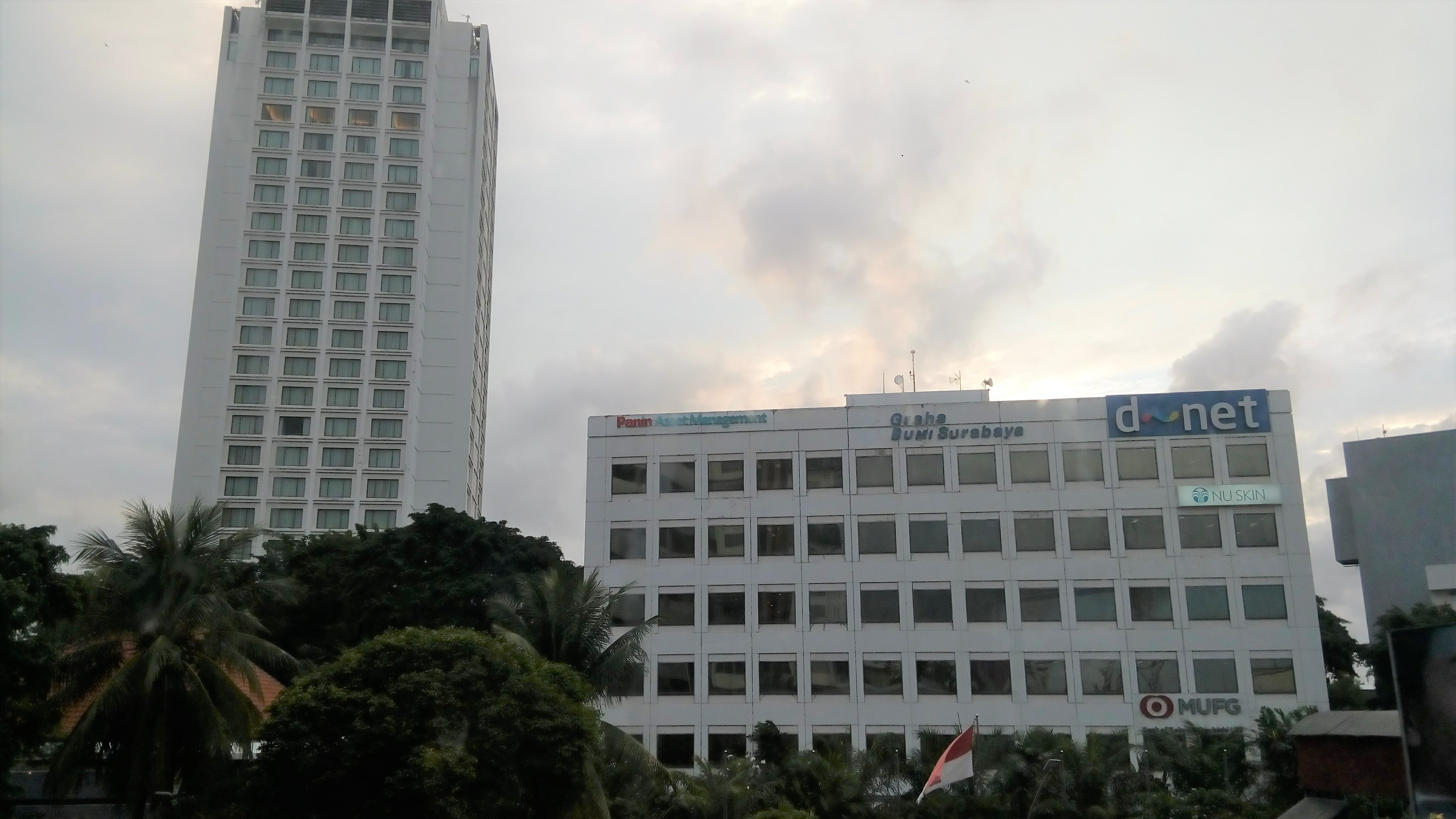
- Headquarters of D~Net in Surabaya
- Trade name: D-NET
- Company type: Privately held company
- Industry: Internet service provider Technology
- Founded: 17 November 1997; 28 years ago
- Founder: Caroline Gondokusumo
- Headquarters: Surabaya, Indonesia
- Area served: Indonesia
- Key people: Caroline Gondokusumo (CEO); Peter Gondokusumo (CFO); Bimelina Oetomo (COO)
- Website: dnetprovider.id

PT Dutakom Wibawa Putra or commonly known as D~NET is an Indonesian internet service provider company based in Surabaya, Indonesia. The company focuses on technology as a provider of internet services and information technology of business solutions for corporations. The company was founded by Caroline Gondokusumo in 1997. Currently D-NET has 3 branch offices located in Malang, Denpasar and Mataram.

== History ==
PT Dutakom Wibawa Putra (D~NET Surabaya) was founded in 1997 by Caroline Gondokusumo. In the beginning, Caroline Gondokusumo worked for PT Core Mediatech, The principal holder of brand name (D-NET, not D~Net), was led by Sylvia Sumarlin and based in Jakarta, not yet having another branch office. In hopes of providing a better internet connection in Surabaya, Caroline Gondokusumo, with permission from Sylvia Sumarlin, then created a new company, D~NET Surabaya. But despite carrying the same brand, the two companies, PT Core Mediatech and PT Dutakom Wibawa Putra, are different companies and not related to each other.

D~NET surabaya then expanding the coverage area by having a point of presence office in Malang, East Java in 2004 and was then followed by the opening of a branch office in Denpasar, Bali in 2008 and Mataram, Lombok in 2017.

== Brands ==
- Dedicated Connectivity
- Broadband Internet Connectivity
- Solusi Bisnis

== Subsidiaries ==
- PT Spectrum Indo Wibawa
- PT Omadata Padma Indonesia
- PT Fiberindo Laju Raya
- PT Makmur Jati Teknologi (Teakwave)
- PT Datakom Padma Jaya
- PT Indoreka Jaya Wutama

== Partnership with Facebook ==
In 2017, D~Net offered a partnership by Facebook to establish Express Wi-Fi, a service provide internet access via public Wi-Fi hotspots that are "fast, affordable, and reliable" (as per Facebook). Facebook assists partners by providing a comprehensive Wi-Fi platform that partners can leverage to better manage and grow their Wi-Fi offerings. Express WiFi was first present in Indonesia in several places in Bromo Tengger Semeru National Park.

After the success of the pilot project in Mount Bromo, the development of Express Wi-Fi then continued to Surabaya in 2017. The location of this location was originally motivated by D~NET headquarters in Surabaya to facilitate implementation, monitoring and development of the WiFi Express network, but in the future, Express WiFi will be available in various regions in Indonesia.

== See also ==
- Express Wi-Fi
- Internet service provider
