= Prelude Fertility =

American fertility clinics

- Company type: Private
- Industry: Healthcare; Fertility
- Founder: Martin Varsavsky
- Key people: TJ Farnsworth (CEO)
- Services: Fertility Services; In Vitro Fertilization; Egg Freezing; Egg Donation
- Website: https://www.preludefertility.com/

Prelude Fertility is a network of fertility clinics in the United States that offer fertility services including in vitro fertilization (IVF), egg donation, genetic testing, and egg freezing. As of 2019, the Prelude Fertility Network of clinics included 23 fertility practices and 36 locations in the U.S. and more than 60 affiliated reproductive endocrinologists.

== History ==
Prelude Fertility was founded by Martin Varsavsky following his and his wife’s experience with fertility treatment and IVF.

The company launched in October 2016 when Varsavsky secured funding from Lee Equity Partners to purchase a majority stake in Reproductive Biology Associates, an IVF clinic in Atlanta, and My Egg Bank, the largest frozen donor egg bank in the U.S.

In September 2017, Prelude acquired a majority stake in Pacific Fertility Center in San Francisco. The following month, Prelude acquired Vivere Health. In March 2018, Prelude acquired the Advanced Fertility Center of Chicago. In October 2018, Prelude announced a partnership with NYU Langone. In March 2019, Prelude announced a partnership with Inception Fertility and also announced TJ Farnsworth as the company’s new CEO. The partnership made Prelude the largest fertility services provider in the U.S and added Aspire Fertility clinics to the Prelude Network.
