= Iome =

British technology company

iome Ltd.
- Formerly: IO Global Ltd
- Company type: Public company
- Industry: Technology
- Founded: 2004
- Defunct: 2012
- Fate: Unknown
- Headquarters: Ipswich, United Kingdom
- Key people: Phil Eames (CEO)
- Products: Location based internet services
- Website: www.io-me.com at the Wayback Machine (archived February 20, 2012)

Iome was a British technology company that provided digital location-based services to consumers. It provided the services via internet and mobile using Iome's technology to link activities, interests, locations, routes and places so people could plan ahead and make bookings, based on personal preferences and their location.

Iome had offices in London and Ipswich and was publicly listed on the Hong Kong Stock Exchange. The company's website was no longer operating after 2012.

== History ==
The company was created as io global in May 2005 by British Telecommunications and New Venture Partners after five years development in BT's Research Laboratories. The company rebranded as iome in May 2009.

Iome was the technology company behind the launch of the BT MyPlace service in February 2009 and Plotstar in November 2009.
