= Carlos Varsavsky =

Argentine astrophysicist (1933–1983)

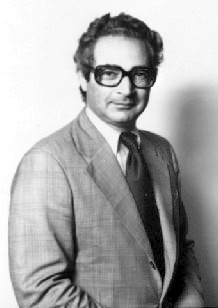
Carlos Varsavsky

Carlos M. Varsavsky (1933–1983) was an Argentine astrophysicist.

== Early life ==
Varsavsky was born in Buenos Aires in 1933. After completing secondary studies in the Colegio Nacional de Buenos Aires, he settled in the United States. In the US, Varsavsky graduated in physical engineering, in which he also obtained a master's degree from the University of Colorado. In 1959 he did his doctorate in astronomy at Harvard University. He was the younger brother of Argentinian mathematician and social scientist Oscar Varsavsky.

== In Argentina ==
In 1960, Varsavsky returned to Argentina, where he joined the newly created group of Astrophysics at the University of Buenos Aires and worked as senior lecturer in physics until 1966. He was the founder and first director of the Argentine Institute of Radio Astronomy, founded in 1964, and president of the Association of Physics in Argentina. Furthermore, he participated in the construction of the largest radio telescope in the Southern Hemisphere, which is located in Villa Elisa, Buenos Aires.

During the Periodo de facto (the military juntas of 1966–1973 and 1976–1983) and in a university environment, Varsavsky maintained a consistent democratic attitude – even during the incident that is known as “la noche de los bastones largos” in which the military of Juan Carlos Onganía government attacked the Faculty of Mathematical and Natural Sciences of Buenos Aires. Students, graduates and professors were beaten with the aim of dismantling the reformist project of building a university of science of excellence.

== In United States ==
In 1977, during the Dirty War (Guerra Sucia) that caused the kidnapping and brutal murder of his nephew, David Horacio Varsavsky, Carlos M. Varsavsky saw no choice but to leave Argentina. He emigrated with his family to the United States where Wassily Leontief, Nobel Memorial Prize in Economic Sciences winner, made him the associate director of the Institute of Economic Analysis at New York University.

Starting in 1980, he worked for Franco Macri on the development of Riverside South under the project name "Lincoln West".

Varsavsky had two children: Paula Varsavsky, author and cultural journalist, and Martin Varsavsky, entrepreneur and founder of the Varsavsky Foundation. Varsavsky died in 1983, at the age of 49, when he was still working as associate director of the Institute of Economic Analysis at New York University.

== Work and contributions ==
His doctoral thesis on atomic transitions has been a reference for many generations of students of astrophysics. His predictions about abundant molecular hydrogen in clouds, though controversial at that time, have been verified with modern methods of observation.

Some of his working papers include:

- “Vida en el Universo” (Life in the Universe). Buenos Aires: CEAL, 1971.
- “Una Introducción al Universo” (An Introduction to the Universe). Buenos Aires: Estrada, 1973.
- “Astronomía Elemental” (Basics of Astronomy). Buenos Aires: Estrada, 1969.
- “Sobre la Posibilidad de Cambiar la Actual Semana de Siete Días” (On the Possibility of Changing the Present Seven-Day Week – unpublished), sponsored by the Ford Foundation in 1975.

=== Six-day week ===
Varsavsky noted that there are astronomical reasons for determining the relative lengths of a day, a month or a year, but there are no astronomical reasons for the week to be seven days, when a lunar cycle is not 28 days but about 29½ days. An astronomically closer but still imperfect division would be to have five weeks of six days.

He hypothesized that it should be possible to have everyone to work one day less, yet maintain their global production (or national GDP) If the population was split into three approximately equal groups (he called them Red, Blue and White to appeal to the French, British and American readers) and everyone in the same family were to work the same week, then each group is ready to work and rest at overlapping times, but not simultaneously (as at present). Society would have one third of its people working the red week, another third the blue week and the third the white week. Every day throughout the year there would be two groups working their four occupational days of the week and one resting for their two-day weekend.

The GDP would stay the same, or perhaps improve, because all the fixed investment of society would be used every day instead if five or six seventh of the time available. Every school, factory, office, shop, home, road that the public invests in building would be used every day of the year, but not by the same people.

== Carlos M. Varsavsky Award ==
The Argentine Astronomical Society (Asociación Argentina de Astronomía), together with the Varsavsky Foundation, gives every 2 years the Carlos M. Varsavsky Award to the best PhD thesis in Astronomy.
