= Ample (company) =

American EV battery swapping company

Ample Inc.
- Company type: Private
- Industry: Electric vehicles
- Founded: 2014; 11 years ago
- Founder: Khaled Hassounah, John de Souza
- Headquarters: San Francisco
- Area served: San Francisco Bay Area
- Services: Battery swapping

Ample is a San Francisco-based startup that develops battery swapping technology and stations for electric vehicles.

== History ==
Ample was founded in 2014. In 2021, they raised $160 million in a Series C funding round.

== Technology ==
The company operates drive-in stations in the San Francisco Bay Area which robotically swap out vehicle batteries, servicing vehicles including the Mitsubishi Fuso Canter electric truck.

Ample produces modular batteries which replace vehicles' original batteries. Sources compare Ample's business model to previous failed battery swapping startup Better Place, noting that Ample produces "standard, swappable batteries under the belly of any car without its manufacturer having to engineer vehicles around them".

The firm is working with automakers, including Fisker and Stellantis, to adapt battery swapping technology to different vehicle types and to be able to option vehicles with replaceable batteries.
