= Express Wi-Fi =

Division of Facebook Connectivity

Express Wi-Fi by Facebook
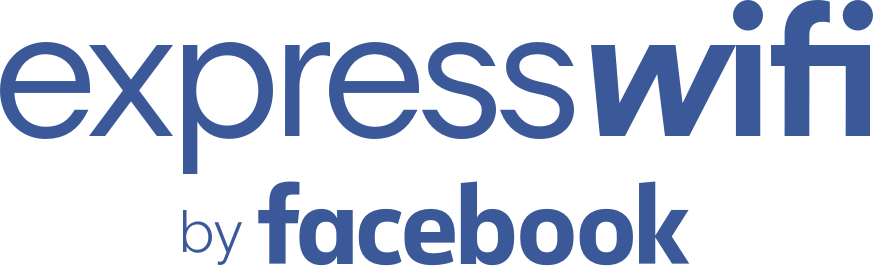
- Area served: Ghana, India, Indonesia, Kenya, Nepal, Nigeria, Philippines, South Africa, and Tanzania
- Owner: Facebook Connectivity
- Website: expresswifi.fb.com at the Wayback Machine (archived 2019-03-14)
- Launched: August 2016; 10 years ago
- Current status: Launched

Express Wi-Fi was a division within Facebook Connectivity, which is a group of global internet connectivity initiatives by Meta. It is one of several programs under the Facebook Connectivity umbrella. It partners with mobile network operators and internet service providers to provide internet access via public Wi-Fi hotspots.

In February 2022, Meta announced that Express Wi-Fi will be shut down, globally.

== Operating locations and local partnerships ==
=== Ghana ===
Service was offered in partnership with Vodafone Ghana in various regions of Ghana.

=== India ===
Service was offered in partnership with internet service providers AirJaldi, LMES, NetVision, Tikona and Shaildhar. in Rajasthan, Uttrakhand, Gujarat, Mizoram and Meghalaya.

=== Indonesia ===
Service was offered in partnership with D~Net, an internet service provider, enabling Facebook and D~NET to establish a presence in city of Surabaya and Sugro, a village in Bromo Tengger Semeru National Park.

=== Kenya ===
Service was offered in partnership with SURF, and BRCK since 2019, an internet service provider. Express Wi-Fi was launched in Kenya on March 29, 2017, providing 1000 Wi-Fi hotspots throughout the greater Nairobi area.

=== Nepal ===
Services were offered in Nepal through partnerships with Worldlink and Microsoft Nepal.

Worldlink used the Express Wi-Fi platform to support 7,500 of their 10,000 hotspot locations across the country and plans to expand their coverage to more rural areas using this partnership.

The collaboration with Microsoft Nepal provides service to Lalitpur, Bhaktapur, and Bharatpur.

=== Nigeria ===
Service was offered in partnership with local internet service providers Tizeti.

=== Philippines ===
Service was offered in partnership with Globe Telecom, a major provider of telecommunications services in the Philippines.

=== South Africa ===
Service was offered in partnership with CellC, a telecommunication company in South Africa

=== Tanzania ===
Service was offered in partnership with Habari, an internet service provider.

=== Brazil & LaTAM ===
Server was offered in partnership with Hughes, a satellite service provider.

== Technology partners ==
In August 2018, Express Wi-Fi by Facebook announced a technology partnership program. The program allows access point manufacturers to produce and supply Wi-Fi hardware that is compatible with Express Wi-Fi. Program participants include Ruckus Networks, an ARRIS Company, Cisco Systems, Inc. (to be certified Oct 2019), Arista Networks, Cambium Networks, Edge-core Networks by Accton Technology Corporation, In February 2019, Nokia announced that Nokia AirScale Wi-Fi platform would also participate in the technology partner program.

In 2020, the Italian software company Tanaza has joined Facebook Connectivity's Express Wi-Fi Technology Partner Program.

In 2021, Abloomy, a US-based cloud Wi-Fi management software company, has joined Facebook's Express Wi-Fi Technology Partner Program.
