= Jazztel =

- Company type: Subsidiary of Orange España
- Industry: Telecommunications
- Founded: 1998
- Founder: Martin Varsavsky
- Headquarters: Madrid, Spain
- Area served: Spain
- Key people: (Chairman); Jose Miguel Garcia Fernandez (CEO)
- Products: Broadband Internet access
- Owner: Orange España
- ASN: 12715
- Peering policy: Restrictive
- Website: www.jazztel.com

Jazztel is a Spanish telecommunications company which offers triple play services (telephone, Internet and television). In 2018, Jazztel was made to pay fines for their telemarketing tactics.

== History ==
Founded in 1998 by Martin Varsavsky, Jazztel is a Spanish company, owned by a British company called Jazztel p.l.c. It was incorporated under the laws of England and Wales in July 1998. Jazztel p.l.c. is listed on the Spanish Nuevo Mercado since December 18, 2000.

Its internet brand, Ya.com, was later sold to T-Online and then to Orange.

In September 2014, Orange España agreed to acquire Jazztel for €3.4 billion.
