= EE WiFi =

Wi-Fi hotspot service in the United Kingdom

- Owner: BT Group
- Industry: Telecommunications
- Website: ee-wifi.ee.co.uk
- Commercial: Yes
- Current status: Active

EE WiFi is a Wi-Fi hotspot service provided by BT Group for the UK. Its predecessor, BT Wi-fi was established following a rebranding of the former BT Openzone and BT Fon, bringing both of the services under one name until the Fon partnership ended. It supports the BT Consumer division. It is the UK's largest wi-fi network with more than 5 million hotspots in the UK.

In 2023 BT WiFi rebranded to EE WiFi in preparation to rebrand all BT consumer services to EE.
