= Martín Varsavsky =

Argentine born entrepreneur (born 1960)

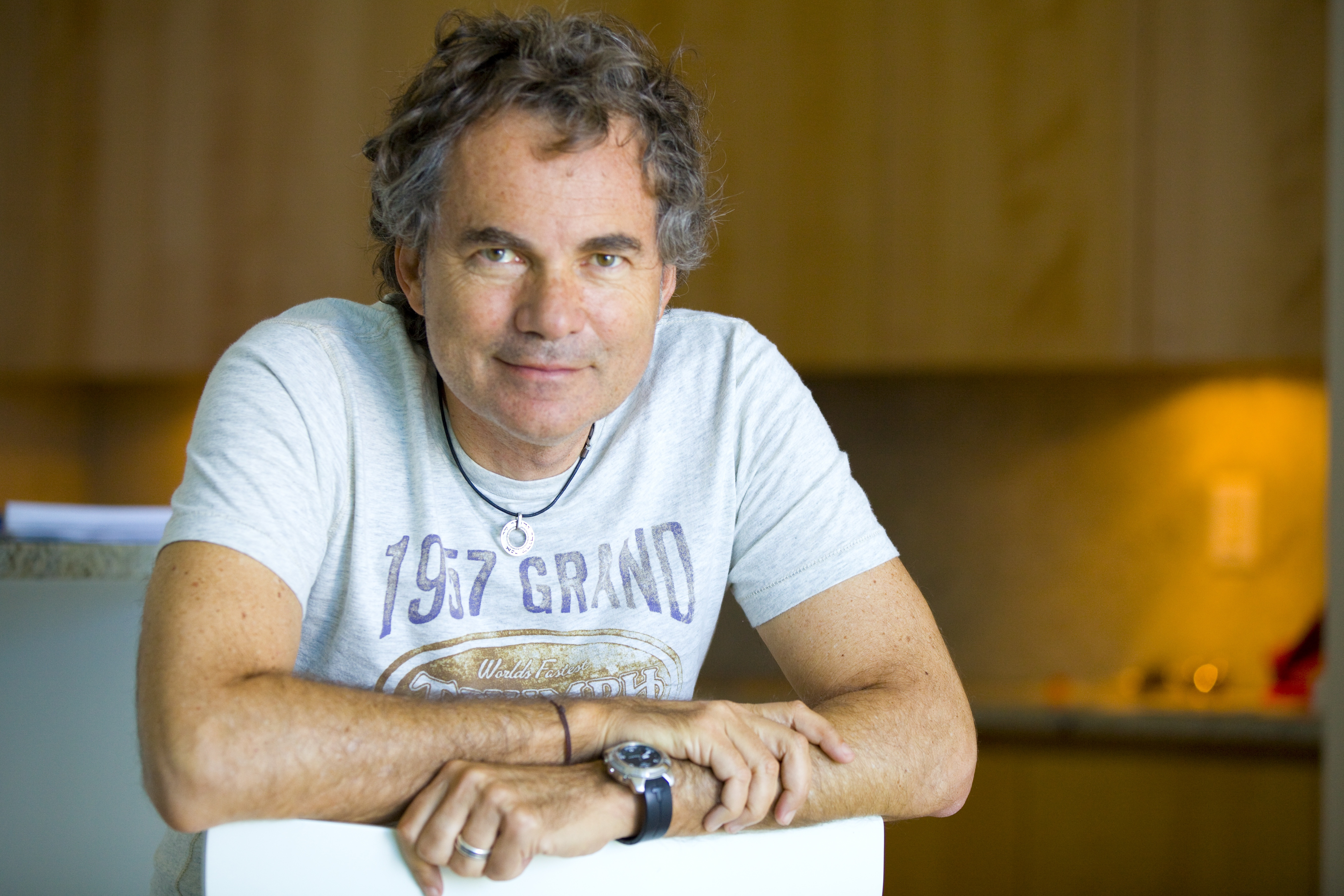
- Varsavsky in 2011
- Born: Martín Varsavsky Waisman; April 26, 1960 (age 66); Buenos Aires, Argentina
- Education: New York University; Columbia University
- Occupation: Entrepreneur
- Spouse: Nina Wiegand (m. 2009)
- Children: 7
- Parent: Carlos Varsavsky
- Website: english.martinvarsavsky.net

Martín Varsavsky Waisman-Diamond (born April 26, 1960) is an Argentine-Spanish entrepreneur and philanthropist who has founded more than ten companies across telecommunications, renewable energy, biotechnology, fertility medicine, autonomous vehicles, and artificial intelligence. He is currently CEO of Certuma, an autonomous clinical AI company, and chairman of Gameto, Inception Fertility (formerly Prelude Fertility), and Overture Life.

== Early life and education ==
Varsavsky was born in Buenos Aires to a Jewish family. His father is Carlos Varsavsky, a Harvard-educated astrophysicist; his mother is Silvia Waisman-Diamond. At age 17, Varsavsky and his family fled Argentina as refugees during the military dictatorship, assisted by B'nai B'rith. The family's departure was precipitated by the forced disappearance of his cousin, David Horacio Varsavsky, one of the desaparecidos of the Dirty War.

In 1981 he obtained a BA at the New York University, in 1983 he earned an MA in international affairs from Columbia University and in 1985 an MBA at Columbia Business School.

== Career ==
=== First projects ===
While at Columbia, Varsavsky founded Urban Capital Corporation with Len Kahn, focused on residential and commercial real state redevelopment in Tribeca and SoHo. In 1986 he co-founded Medicorp Sciences in Montreal alongside Argentine scientist Claudio Cuello and Nobel laureate César Milstein; the company developed early commercial HIV and PSA diagnostic tests.

In 1991, Varsavsky founded the telecommunications company Viatel in Colorado, which operated a call-back service, as an alternative traditional long-distance operators. Viatel later became an alternative telecommunications service provider in France, Belgium, Italy, Spain and the United Kingdom. In 1997 Varsavsky resigned his official positions and sold his Viatel shares.

=== Jazztel and Ya.com ===
In July 1995, Varsavsky moved to Madrid, Spain. From 1999 to 2011 he taught courses on entrepreneurship at IE Business School (formerly Instituto de Empresa) in Spain. In 1997, Varsavsky founded Jazztel, an alternative telecommunications access provider in the Iberian Peninsula. Headquartered in Madrid and with its own infrastructure, the company became a telecommunications operator offering bandwidth for residential and commercial customers, competing with Telefónica. Jazztel went public on the London Stock Exchange in December 1999. The company was acquired by Orange (France Telecom) in 2015 for approximately €3.4 billion.

In 1999, he created Ya.com Internet Factory, a Spanish internet services/DSL provider that also included the Spanish language online travel agency Viajar.com. Ya.com was owned by Jazztel (70%), Varsavsky (10%) and the company's' staff (20%). It was sold in 2000 to T-Online International, Deutsche Telekom's Internet subsidiary for approximately 650 million euros. In 2000, Varsavsky created EINSTEINet AG, an application service provider (ASP) in Germany. Einsteinet was a company built on the premise that most applications were going to migrate from people's PCs to the internet. EINSTEINet did not materialize, the company was sold and represented losses for Varsavsky for 35 million euros.

=== Fon, Eolia and Prelude Fertility ===
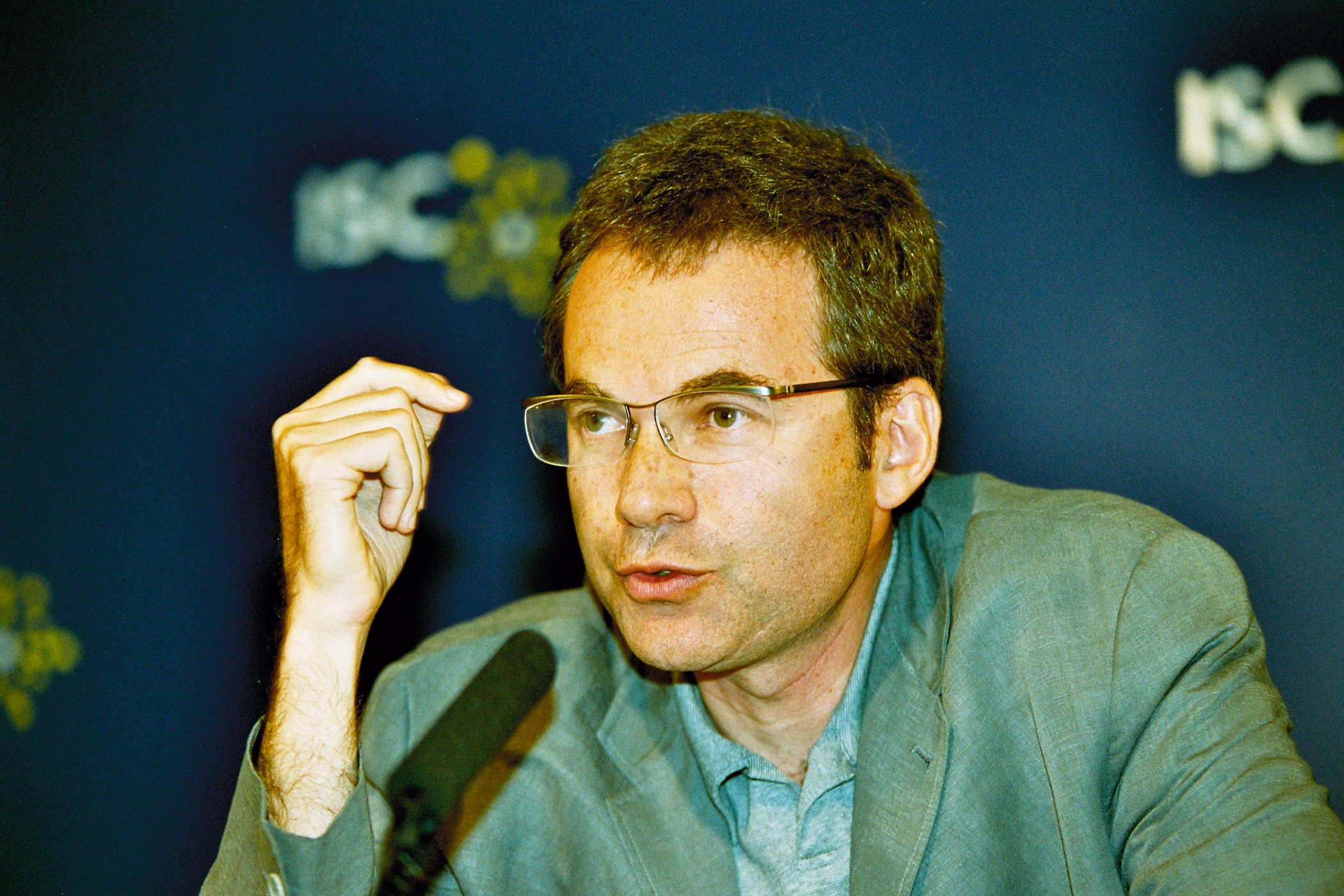
Varsavsky in 2001

He launched the company Fon in Madrid at the end of 2005, which provided international WiFi services using user-generated infrastructure. Fon was backed by equity investors Google, Skype, Microsoft, Index Ventures Qualcomm Ventures, and Deutsche Telekom. In 2019, Varsavsky sold all of his shares in the company.

In 2007, Varsavsky co-founded Eolia Renovables with Miguel Salis. Eolia became one of Spain's largest renewable-energy companies, operating large-scale wind and solar farms, and was sold for approximately €1.1 billion. In March 2014, he joined the board of directors of the German publishing house Axel Springer; he served in this capacity as an outside director until his resignation in 2025.

In 2016, he founded Prelude Fertility after securing $200 million in private equity funding from Lee Equity. The company, which combines techniques such as egg and sperm cryopreservation, in vitro fertilization, and embryo transfer, offers a monthly payment plan to make these procedures more accessible to young, fertile women who wish to delay motherhood. The firm acquired the Reproductive Biology Associates clinic and My Egg Bank to begin operations.

=== Overture Life, Barter Energy and autonomous mobility projects ===
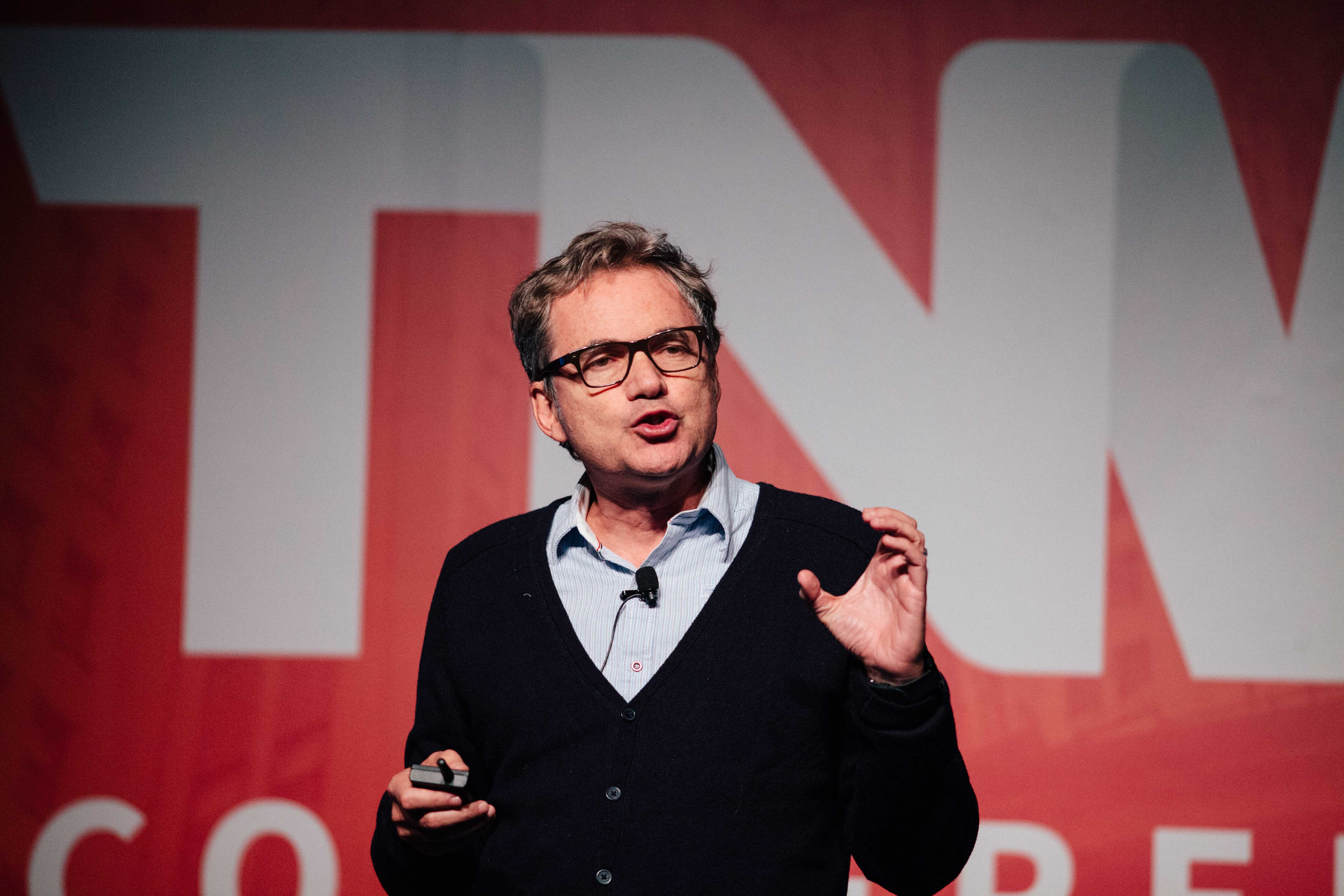
Varsavsky in 2014

In 2017, Varsavsky founded Overture Life, focused on automating the embryology lab. Overture is backed by Khosla Ventures, Marc Benioff and Allen & Company. In 2018, Varsavsky co-founded Goggo Network with Yasmine Fage, a company operating autonomous-vehicle and delivery-robot fleets in Europe. Goggo raised a €44 million Series A in December 2019 from SoftBank Group and Axel Springer Digital Ventures, and partnered with Mobileye to deploy Level 4 autonomous vehicles in Spanish and French cities.

In 2021, Martin founded Levere Holdings, a publicly traded (NASDAQ: LVRA) Special Purpose Acquisition Company (SPAC) seeking to invest and merge with a business that will play a key role in the future of mobility in EMEA, focusing on the development of mobility services, connected vehicles, electric vehicles and autonomous driving.

In March 2020, at the request of the Community of Madrid, the entrepreneur coordinated the development of CoronaMadrid, an app designed to assess symptoms and relieve pressure on emergency services during the COVID-19 pandemic. Companies like Telefónica, Google, and Ferrovial collaborated on the project. A year later, he co-founded Barter Energy, an energy company specializing in the development of solar communities and electric mobility in Spain. In May 2025, the energy retailer Visalia acquired the entire company.

=== Gameto and Certuma ===
In 2022, Varsavsky co-founded Gameto alongside Dina Radenkovic. The biotechnology company utilizes cell therapy derived from induced pluripotent stem cells to address infertility through a treatment known as Fertilo. After securing $40 million in cumulative funding, the firm launched its preclinical studies in Madrid. By 2025, Fertilo had reached Phase 3 clinical trials under FDA oversight and raised $127 million in venture capital from investors including Future Ventures, Insight Partners, Two Sigma Ventures, and RA Capital, among others.

In 2026, he founded Certuma, a company dedicated to developing artificial intelligence for medical diagnostics. Based in Austin with an initial investment of $10 million, the project is currently seeking FDA approval. That same year, he launched Fast.doctor, a platform that integrates AI with direct supervision from licensed physicians. Although designed for the U.S. market, the platform began its initial operations in Argentina.

== Other work ==
According to Business Insider, Varsavsky has invested an average of €250,000 through his fund, VAS Ventures, in mobility companies such as Ample, Voyage, Mox, and Websense; healthcare firms like 23andMe, Forward, Daye, and Companion; finance and software startups including Verse, Reclamador, Shujinko, and Merlin; and lifestyle and education ventures such as Yada, Busuu, Jüsto, Noken, and Pixowl. He was also an early investor in Twitter. Outside of telecommunications, he was the majority shareholder of the wind park El Moralejo (a renewable energy generator) and Proesa, owner of the fashion labels Sybilla and Jocomomola.

Beyond his business ventures, he has taught entrepreneurship at institutions including Columbia Business School, New York University, and IE University. He manages his assets through his family office, Jazzya Investments, and leads two investment entities with combined capital of $200 million: VAS Ventures (focused on early-stage startups) and MVB (oriented toward late-stage investments).

Varsavsky has authored articles on business and international relations for various publications, including El País, El Mundo, and HuffPost. He is a frequent contributor on LinkedIn and a regular speaker at conferences across Europe and the United States.

== Philanthropic work ==
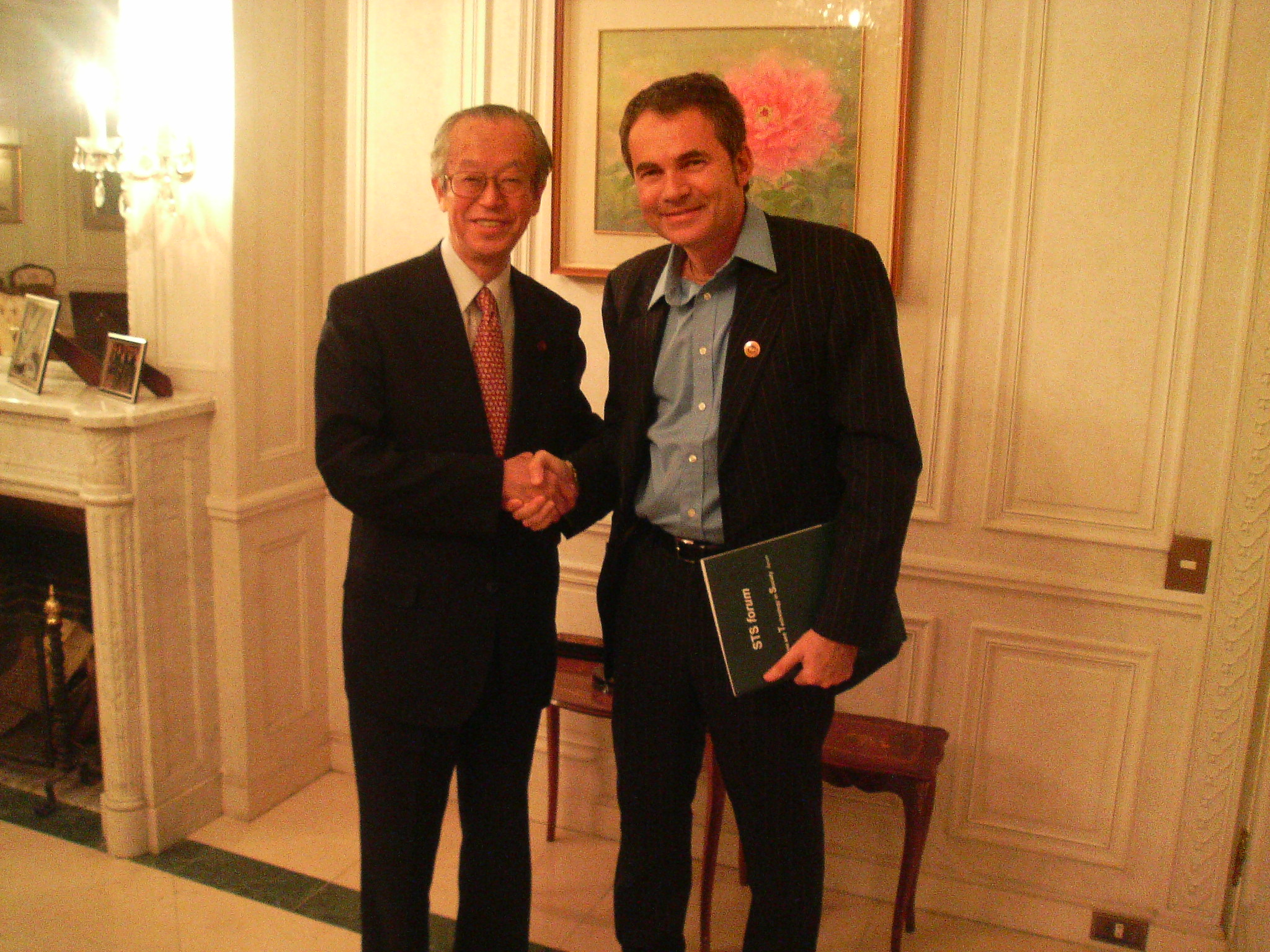
Varsavsky with Koji Omi at STS in Kyoto

Varsavsky chairs the Varsavsky Foundation, which focuses on educational modernization through portals such as Educ.ar in Argentina and Educarchile.cl in Chile. He also leads the Safe Democracy Foundation, an organization that in 2005 co-organized the Atocha Workshop and the International Summit on Terrorism, Democracy and Security alongside the Club of Madrid. Additionally, he has served on the boards of the Clinton Foundation and OneVoice. He eventually resigned from both positions due to ideological differences regarding the management of the Middle East conflict by political sectors in the United States and Europe.

== Personal life ==
Varsavsky married Nina Wiegand on July 22, 2009, in Hawaii. He is the father of seven children. He splits his time between Madrid and the United States. Varsavsky is Jewish and has been a prominent public voice against antisemitism on social media.

In September 2020 he temporarily left Spain for Berlin with his family as a self-proclaimed "COVID-19-refugee", in protest for the measures implemented by the Spanish government to manage the COVID-19 pandemic. Varsavsky has been over the years a staunch critic of the Spanish government led by Prime Minister Pedro Sánchez, showing his support for conservative figures like Madrid's regional president Isabel Díaz Ayuso.

In January 2025 Varsavsky explained in a Twitter post that he promoted, in his role as member of Axel Springer's supervisory board, Elon Musk's opinion piece for Die Welt in which he supported the far right Alternative for Germany in the upcoming German federal election.

He has had a ranch built in the Argentine city of Mendoza, seeing it as a potential shelter in case of a Third World War wiping out the Northern Hemisphere with nuclear weapons, saying “The moment China takes Taiwan or Russia takes Lithuania, I’m in Buenos Aires. It’s good to have a Plan B for civilization.”

== Awards and recognition ==
Varsavsky is the recipient of various honors and rewards, among them:

- Entrepreneur of the Year Award for Professional Career (2019)
- Included in Forbes Spain's 100 Most Creative People in Business list (2019)
- Included in Forbes Spain's 100 Most Creative People list (2017)
- World Technology, Fon: The most innovative organization in technology world (2006)
- Pickering Prize, Columbia University (2003)
- Spanish Entrepreneur of the Year, iBest (2000)
- Global Leader for Tomorrow, World Economic Forum (2000)
- European Entrepreneur of the Year, ECTA (1999)
- European Telecommunications Entrepreneur of the Year (1998)
- Finalist in the Entrepreneur of the Year contest, New York City (1995)
