= List of unicorn startup companies =

Private startup companies valued at over US$1 billion

This is a list of unicorn startup companies:

In finance, a unicorn is a privately held startup company with a current valuation of US$1 billion or more. Notable lists of unicorn companies are maintained by The Wall Street Journal, Fortune Magazine, CNNMoney/CB Insights, TechCrunch, PitchBook/Morningstar, Traxcn and Tech in Asia.

== History ==
Historical progress of unicorns
# Unicorns	Total valuation (US$ billions)	Date	Reported by
39		Late October/early November 2013	TechCrunch
82		Late January 2015	Forbes, CB Insights
229	1,300	January 2016	VentureBeat
208	761	December 2016	TechCrunch
224	771.9	April 2017	TechCrunch
193	665	April 2017	Inc magazine
266	861	August 2018	CB Insights
394	1,200	August 2018	CB Insights
495	1,566	November 2020	CB Insights
963	3,140	January 2022	CB Insights
1,170	3,854	June 2022	CB Insights
1,260	4,386	April 2025	CB Insights
1,290	4,661	July 2025	CB Insights
1,334	5,443	November 2025	CB Insights

== Countries ==
Unicorns are concentrated in developed and some developing global regions, including a few dozen countries.

As per CB Insights, as of July 13, 2024, the number of unicorn startups in some developed and developing countries were as follows:

Table of the number of unicorn startups by country as of March, 2026. This count includes former unicorns that is exited via IPO and acquisition.
Country	Number of unicorns	Number of unicorns per million people
United States	1126	3.31
China	279	0.20
India	131	0.10
United Kingdom	94	1.35
Germany	47	0.55
Israel	42	4.20
South Korea	33	0.64
Singapore	33	5.46
France	31	0.45
Canada	30	0.75
Brazil	25	0.12
Netherlands	15	0.83
Australia	12	0.44
Japan	11	0.09
Indonesia	10	0.03
Hong Kong	10	1.33
Mexico	10	0.08
Ireland	9	1.66
Switzerland	9	1.00
Saudi Arabia	8	0.23
Sweden	8	0.75
Portugal	8	0.77
UAE	6	0.54
Turkey	5	0.06
Finland	5	0.89
Norway	5	0.88
Nigeria	4	0.02
Vietnam	4	0.04
Estonia	4	3.50
Spain	4	0.08
Luxembourg	4	5.95
Lithuania	5	1.75
Czech Republic	3	0.29
Thailand	3	0.04
Egypt	3	0.03
Russia	3	0.02
Philippines	3	0.02
Cayman Islands	3	33.77
Belgium	7	0.59
Taiwan	2	0.09
South Africa	2	0.03
Bangladesh	2	0.01
Malaysia	2	0.06
Chile	2	0.10
Argentina	2	0.31
Austria	2	0.22
Italy	2	0.03
Denmark	2	0.33
Ukraine	2	0.06
Romania	2	0.11
Kazakhstan	1	0.05
Algeria	1	0.02
Bahamas	1	2.48
Bermuda	1	15.64
Anguilla	1	67.49
Colombia	1	0.02
Malta	1	1.74
Seychelles	1	8.24
Croatia	2	0.52
Cyprus	1	0.73
Bulgaria	2	0.32
Uruguay	2	0.59
Uzbekistan	1	0.03
Zimbabwe	1	0.06
Armenia	1	0.36
Greece	1	0.10
Hungary	1	0.10
Iceland	1	2.54
Poland	1	0.03
Liechtenstein	1	25
Latvia	1	0.53

== List ==
Note: below list does not include very-high-value private companies that are not startups (founded more than 20 years ago), such as: Huawei, Valve Corporation, Ferrero SpA, In-N-Out Burger, Chick-fil-A, Raising Cane's, Love's, Wawa, Publix, H-E-B, Aldi, Bosch and Koch.

Company	Valuation (US$ billions)	Valuation date	Industry	Country/ countries	Founder(s)	Ref(s)
OpenAI	852	March 2026	Artificial intelligence	United States	Sam Altman, Elon Musk, Greg Brockman, Ilya Sutskever	
ByteDance	600	April 2026	Internet	China	Zhang Yiming, Liang Rubo	
iFinex Inc.	350	February 2026	Cryptocurrency	British Virgin Islands	Giancarlo Devasini, Raphael Nicolle	
Databricks	190	August 2026	Software	United States	Ali Ghodsi, Andy Konwinski, Ion Stoica, Reynold Xin, Matei Zaharia	
Stripe	159	February 2026	Financial services	United States and Ireland	Patrick and John Collison	
Revolut	115	October 2026	Financial services	United Kingdom	Nikolay Storonsky, Vlad Yatsenko	
Anduril Industries	61	May 2026	Defense technology	United States	Palmer Luckey, Trae Stephens, Matt Grimm, Joe Chen, Brian Schimpf	
Ramp	60	October 2026	Financial technology	United States	Eric Glyman, Karim Atiyeh, Gene Lee	
Cognition AI	48	September 2026	Artificial Intelligence	United States	Scott Wu, Steven Hao, Walden Yan	
Canva	42	October 2024	Graphic design	Australia	Melanie Perkins, Cliff Obrecht, Cameron Adams	
Prometheus	41	June 2026	Artificial Intelligence	United States	Jeff Bezos, Vik Bajaj	
Figure AI	39	September 2025	Humanoid robotics	United States	Brett Adcock	
Safe Superintelligence	32	April 2025	Artificial Intelligence	United States and Israel	Ilya Sutskever, Daniel Gross, Daniel Levy	
VAST Data	30	March 2026	Artificial Intelligence	United States	Renen Hallak, Shachar Fienblit, Jeff Denworth, Alon Horev	
Telegram	30	January 2021	Internet	United Arab Emirates	Nikolai and Pavel Durov	
Scale AI	29	June 2025	Artificial intelligence	United States	Alexandr Wang, Lucy Guo	
Fanatics	27	June 2022	E-commerce	United States	Alan Trager, Mitch Trager, Michael Rubin	
Epic Games	22.5	February 2024	Video games	United States	Tim Sweeney	
ElevenLabs	22	September 2026	AI Audio technologies	Poland	Mati Staniszewski, Piotr Dabkowski	
Kalshi	22	May 2026	Finance	United States	Tarek Mansour and Luana Lopes Lara	
Zipline	21.5	November 2026	Logistics	United States	Keller Rinaudo,Keenan Wyrobek,Ryan Oksenhorn,William Hetzler	
Etched	21	August 2026	Artificial intelligence	United States	Gavin Uberti, Chris Zhu, Robert Wachen	
Perplexity AI	20	September 2025	Artificial Intelligence	United States	Aravind Srinivas, Denis Yarats, Johnny Ho, Andy Konwinski	
Chobani	20	October 2025	Consumer staples	United States	Hamdi Ulukaya	
Groq	20	Dec 2025	Artificial intelligence	United States	Jonathan Ross	
Deel	17.3	October 2025		Israel / United States		
Rippling	16.8	May 2025	Workforce management	United States		
Fal	16	November 2026	Artificial intelligence	United States	Burkay Gur, Gorkem Yurtseven	
Harvey	15.5	September 2026	Artificial intelligence	United States	Winston Weinberg, Gabriel Pereyra	
Helion Energy	15.5	June 2026	Fusion power	United States	David Kirtley, Chris Pihl, George Votroubek	
Yuanfudao	15.5	October 2020	Educational technology	China	Yong Li	
Discord	15	September 2021	Software	United States	Jason Citron, Stanislav Vishnevsky	
DJI	15	September 2016	Technology	China	Frank Wang (Wang Tao)	
GoPuff	15	July 2021	E-commerce	United States	Yakir Gola, Rafael Ilishayev	
Nscale	14.6	March 2026	Artificial Intelligence	United Kingdom	Josh Payne	
Mistral AI	14	September 2025	Artificial Intelligence	France	Arthur Mensch, Guillaume Lample, Timothée Lacroix	
Xiaohongshu	14	September 2023	E-commerce	China	Miranda Qu Fang, Charlwin Mao Wenchao	
Helsing	14	September 2025	Defense	Germany	Torsten Reil, Gundbert Scherf, Niklas Köhler	
Skild AI	14	January 2026	Robotics	United States	Deepak Pathak	
Plaid	13.4	April 2021	Financial technology	United States	Zach Perret, William Hockey	
Lovable	13.3	August 2026	Artificial intelligence	Sweden	Anton Osika, Fabian Hedin	
OpenSea	13.3	August 2025	Financial Technology	United States	Devin Finzer, Chris Maddern	
Superhuman	13	November 2021	Collaborative software	Ukraine/United States	Alex Shevchenko, Max Lytvyn, and Dmytro Lider	
Shield AI	12.6	March 2026	Defense Technology	United States	Brandon Tseng, Ryan Tseng, and Andrew Reiter	
Devoted Health	12.6	October 2021	Healthcare	United States	Todd Park	
Faire	12.59	November 2021	E-commerce	United States	Max Rhodes	
Labs Companies	12.5	April 2025	Frontier Intelligences, Superintelligence, Human-enhancement AI	United States	Duránd F. Davis Jr., and Maya Elz Davis	
NinjaOne	12.3	June 2026	Software	United States	Sal Sferlazza and Chris Matarese	
Cyera	12	June 2026	Cybersecurity	United States and Israel	Yotam Segev, Tamar Bar-Ilan, and Yonatan Itay	
Thinking Machines Lab	12	July 2025	Artificial intelligence	United States	Mira Murati	
OpenEvidence	12	January 2026	Health Technology	United States	Daniel Nadler	
Biosplice Therapeutics	12	April 2021	Health	United States	Osman Kibar	
Bitmain	12	June 2018	Cryptocurrency	China	Jihan Wu	
GoodLeap	12	October 2021	Financial technology	United States	Hayes Barnard, Jason Walker, Matt Dawson	
Checkout.com	12	September 2025	Financial technology	United Kingdom	Guillaume Pousaz	
Whatnot	11.5	November 2025	E-Commerce	United States	Grant LaFontaine (CEO), Logan Head	
Celonis	11	June 2021	Software	Germany	Alex Rinke, Bastian Nominacher, Martin Klenk	
ZongMu Technology	11	June 2021	Self-driving cars	China	Tang Rui	
Bilt Rewards	10.75	July 2025	Financial Technology	United States	Ankur Jain	
Colossal Biosciences	10.2	January 2025	Biotechnology	United States	George Church, Ben Lamm	
Alchemy	10.2	January 2022	Blockchain	United States	Joe Lau and Nikil Viswanathan	
WHOOP	10.1	March 2026	Wearable technology	United States	Will Ahmed	
Chehaoduo	10	July 2021	Marketplace	China		
Digital Currency Group	10	November 2021	Venture capital	United States	Barry Silbert	
Gusto	10	August 2021	Software	United States	Joshua Reeves, Edward Kim, Tomer London	
Instinct	10	September 2026	Artificial Intelligence	United States	Noah Shinn	
KuCoin	10	May 2022	Cryptocurrency	Seychelles	Chun Gan, Ke Tang, Johnny Lyu	
Lalamove	10	January 2021	Supply chain management	Hong Kong / China	Chow Shing-Yuk	
Mercor	10	October 2025	Artificial Intelligence	United States	Brendan Foody, Adarsh Hiremath, Surya Midha	
Notion Labs	10	October 2021	Productivity software	United States	Ivan Zhao, Simon Last, Akshay Kothari, Chris Prucha, Jessica Lam, Toby Schachman	
Polygon Technology	10	February 2022	Blockchain, Web3	India / Cayman Islands	Jaynti Kanani, Sandeep Nailwal, Anurag Arjun, Mihailo Bjelic	
Ripple	10	December 2019	Cryptocurrency	United States	Chris Larsen, Jed McCaleb	
Talkdesk	10	August 2021	Software as a service	Portugal / United States	Cristina Fonseca, Tiago Paiva	
Oyo	9.6	August 2021	Hospitality	India	Ritesh Agarwal	
OutSystems	9.5	February 2021	Software development	Portugal / United States	Paulo Rosado, Rui Pereira	
Vercel	9.3	September 2025	Cloud computing / AI	United States	Guillermo Rauch	
HeyTea	9.3	July 2021	Retail	China		
Neuralink	9	May 2025	Neurotechnology	United States	Elon Musk	
Replit	9	March 2026	Artificial Intelligence	United States	Amjad Masad, Faris Masad, Haya Odeh	
Tanium	9	June 2020	Cybersecurity	United States	David Hindawi, Orion Hindawi	
Legora	8.8	October 2026	Artificial intelligence	Sweden	Max Junestrand, Sigge Labor, August Erséus	
Kavak	8.7	October 2021	Marketplace	Mexico	Carlos García Ottati	
Rapyd	8.7	August 2021	Financial technology	United Kingdom	Arik Shtilman, Arkady Karpman, Omer Priel	
Nuro	8.6	November 2021	Robotics	United States	Jiajun Zhu, Dave Ferguson	
Snyk	8.5	September 2021	Application security	United Kingdom	Assaf Hefetz, Danny Grander	
Bolt	8.4	January 2022	Transportation	Estonia	Markus Villig	
Together AI	8.3	July 2026	Artificial Intelligence	United States	Vipul Ved Prakash, Ce Zhang, Chris Ré, Tri Dao, Percy Liang	
Dream11	8	November 2021	Fantasy sports	India	Harsh Jain, Bhavit Sheth	
Flexport	8	February 2022	Logistics	United States	Ryan Petersen	
Airwallex	8	December 2025	Financial services	Australia / Hong Kong	Jack Zhang, Max Li, Lucy Liu, Xijing Dai, Ki-lok Wong	
StarkWare Industries	8	May 2022	Blockchain	Israel	Eli Ben-Sasson, Michael Riabzev, Uri Kolodny, Alessandro Chiesa	
Dapper Labs	7.6	September 2021	NFT	Canada		
Zipline	7.6	January 2026	Logistics	United States	Keller Rinaudo Cliffton, Keenan Wyrobek, Ryan Oksenhorn, William Hetzler	
AlphaSense	7.5	June 2026	Software	United States (formerly Finland)	Jaakko Kokko, Raj Neervannan	
Razorpay	7.5	December 2021	Financial technology	India	Harshil Mathur, Shashank Kumar	
TypeSafe AI	7.5	October 2026	Artificial intelligence	United States	Diogo Almeida, Sasha Sheng, Erik Gafni	
Carta	7.4	August 2021	Software	United States	Henry Ward	
Ola Consumer	7.3	December 2021	Transportation	India	Bhavish Aggarwal, Ankit Bhati	
Gong	4.5	November 2025	June 2021	Artificial intelligence		
PsiQuantum	7	March 2025	Quantum computing	United States	Jeremy O'Brien; Terry Rudolph; Peter Shadbolt; Mark Thompson	
Automation Anywhere	6.8	November 2019	Robotic process automation	United States		
1Password	6.8	July 2021	Password manager	Canada		
WeDoctor	6.8	February 2021	Healthcare	China		
Cohere	6.8	August 2025	Artificial intelligence	Canada	Aidan Gomez, Ivan Zhang, Nick Frosst	
Yanolja	6.7	July 2021	Hospitality	South Korea	Lee Su-jin	
Ziroom	6.6	March 2020	Real estate technology	China		
Mollie	6.5	June 2021	Financial technology	Netherlands		
CRED	6.4	June 2022	Financial technology	India	Kunal Shah	
DataRobot	6.3	July 2021	Artificial intelligence	United States		
Personio	6.3	October 2021	Software	Germany		
Doctolib	6.2	August 2022	Healthcare	France		
Tenstorrent	6.2	October 2026	Semiconductors	Canada	Ljubisa Bajic, Milos Trajkovic, Ivan Hamer	
Flapping Airplanes	6	October 2026	Artificial intelligence	United States	Aidan Smith, Asher Spector, Ben Spector	
iCapital	6	2022	Financial services	United States		
Xingsheng Youxuan	6	January 2021	Retail	China		
SandboxAQ	5.6	December 2024	Quantum technology, Artificial intelligence	United States	Jack Hidary; Eric Schmidt	
Back Market	5.8	August 2022	Marketplace	France		
The Boring Company	5.7	April 2022	Construction	United States	Elon Musk	
Relex	5.68	February 2022	Supply Chain Automation	Finland	Johanna Småros, Mikko Kärkkäinen, and Michael Falck	
Contentsquare	5.6	August 2022	Software as a service	France		
Fivetran	5.6	September 2021	Data infrastructure	United States		
Postman	5.6	August 2021	Software as a service	India / United States		
PhonePe	5.5	December 2020	Financial technology	India	Sameer Nigam, Rahul Chari	
Viva Republica (Toss)	5.48	June 2021	Financial technology	South Korea		
Higgsfield	5.4	August 2026	Artificial Intelligence	United States	Alex Mashrabov	
Trade Republic	5.3	May 2021	Financial technology	Germany		
Rappi	5.25	July 2021	Transportation	Colombia		
Oura Health	5.2	December 2024	Wearables	Finland	Petteri Lahtela, Kari Kivelä, and Markku Koskela	
Blockchain.com	5.2	March 2021	Cryptocurrency	United Kingdom		
Ineffable Intelligence	5.1	April 2026	Artificial intelligence	United Kingdom	David Silver	
OneTrust	5.1	December 2020	Cybersecurity	United Kingdom / United States		
SambaNova	5.1	April 2021	Artificial intelligence	United States		
Collibra	5+	January 2019	Data governance	Belgium	Pieter De Leenheer, Felix Van de Maele, Stijn Christiaens	
CloudKitchens	5	November 2019	Ghost kitchen	United States		
Hello TransTech	5	March 2021	Transportation	China		
Hopper	5	August 2021	Travel	Canada		
OfBusiness	5	December 2021	B2B e-commerce	India	Bhuvan Gupta, Vasant Sridhar, Ruchi Kalra, Nitin Jain, Asish Mohapatra	
Qonto	5	August 2022	Finance	France	Steve Anavi, Alexandre Prot	
River AI	5	August 2026	Artificial intelligence	United States	Igor Babuschkin	
Ro	5	March 2021	Health technology	United States		
Wonderful	5	September 2026	Artificial intelligence	Israel/Netherlands	Bar Winkler, Roey Lalazar	
Zepz	5	August 2021	Financial technology	United Kingdom		
Animoca Brands	5	January 2022	Blockchain gaming	Hong Kong	Yat Siu	
Octopus Energy	5	December 2021	Energy supply	United Kingdom		
Pleo	4.7	December 2021	Financial technology	Denmark		
Checkr	4.6	August 2021	Human resource management	United States		
Dataiku	4.6	August 2021	Artificial intelligence	France / United States		
GetBlock	4.6	June 2020	Blockchain	Georgia	Steven Lloyd	
Sorare	4.6	August 2022	Fantasy sports	France		
Magic Leap	4.5	February 2016	Augmented reality	United States		
Socure	4.5	November 2021	Identity management	United States		
Vinted	4.5	May 2021	Marketplace	Lithuania	Milda Mitkutė, Justas Janauskas	
Quince	4.5	July 2025	Enterprise Technology	United States	Sid Gupta, Zunu Mittal, Sourabh Mahajan	
Outreach	4.4	June 2021	Sales	United States		
Arctic Wolf Networks	4.3	July 2021	Cybersecurity	United States		
Chainalysis	4.2	June 2021	Blockchain	United States		
Relativity Space	4.2	June 2021	Aerospace	United States		
Bitpanda	4.1	August 2021	Cryptocurrency	Austria		
Dataminr	4.1	March 2021	Data analytics	United States		
Yello Mobile	4.05	November 2016	Software industry	South Korea		
Abnormal Security	4	May 2022	Cybersecurity	United States	Evan Reiser, Sanjay Jeyakumar	
Branch Metrics	4	February 2022	Marketing	United States		
BrowserStack	4	June 2021	Software	India	Ritesh Arora, Nakul Aggarwal	
Clubhouse	4	April 2021	Messaging	United States	Paul Davison and Rohan Seth	
EliseAI	4	September 2026	Artificial intelligence	United States	Minna Song, Tony Stoyanov	
Houzz	4	June 2017	Interior design	United States		
Megvii	4	May 2019	Technology	China		
Melio	4	September 2021	Financial technology	Israel		
Patreon	4	April 2021	Online membership service	United States	Jack Conte, Sam Yam	
PointClickCare	4	January 2021	Software	Canada		
QuintoAndar	4	May 2021	Real estate	Brazil		
Niantic	3.95	January 2019	Video games	United States		
StockX	3.8	April 2021	E-commerce	United States		
Articulate	3.75	July 2021	Educational technology	United States		
Cohesity	3.7	March 2021	Software	United States		
Noom	3.7	May 2021	Healthcare	United States		
PAPAYA Global	3.7	September 2021	Workforce management	Israel / United States		
ShareChat	3.7	December 2021	Social network	India	Ankush Sachdeva, Bhanu Pratap Singh, Farid Ahsan	
Shouqi	3.55	December 2016	Transportation	China		
Coalition	3.5	September 2021	Cybersecurity	United States		
Commure	3.5	September 2021	Health technology	United States		
Mirakl	3.5	September 2021	Marketplace	France		
N26	3.5	July 2019	Financial services	Germany		
Preferred Networks	3.33	September 2019	Artificial intelligence	Japan		
CARS24	3.3	December 2021	Marketplace	India	Vikram Chopra, Mehul Agrawal, Gajendra Jangid and Ruchit Agarwal	
Kurly	3.3	July 2021	E-commerce	South Korea		
Youxia Motors	3.3	October 2018	Electric vehicles	China		
MoonPay	3.4	November 2021	Cryptocurrency	United States		
Upstox	3.4	November 2021	Financial technology	India	Ravi Kumar, Kavitha Subramanian, Shrini Viswanath	
Plus.ai	3.3	May 2021	Self-driving trucks	United States		
Starburst Data	3.3	February 2022	Data analytics	United States	Justin Borgman, Matt Fuller, Kamil Bajda-Pawlikowski, Anu Sudarsan, Wojciech Biela, Grzegorz Kokosiński, Lukasz Osipiuk, Martin Traverso	
Thumbtack	3.2	June 2021	Software	United States	Marco Zappacosta	
ApplyBoard	3.2	June 2021	Educational technology	Canada	Martin Basiri, Massi Basiri, Meti Basiri	
Blockstream	3.2	August 2021	Blockchain	Canada		
ConsenSys	3.2	November 2021	Blockchain	United States		
Flutterwave	3.2	June 2026	Financial technology	Nigeria / United States	Olugbenga Agboola , Iyinoluwa Aboyeji	
Verkada	3.2	September 2022	Physical security	United States	Filip Kailiszan, James Ren, Benjamin Bercowitz, Hans Robertson	
Eruditus	3.2	August 2021	Educational technology	India		
SpotOn	3.15	September 2021	Financial technology	United States		
TiendaNube	3.1	August 2021	E-commerce	Argentina		
Udaan	3.1	January 2021	B2B e-commerce	India	Vaibhav Gupta, Amod Malviya, Sujeet Kumar	
LangChain	3	November 2026	Artificial intelligence	United States		
Wildlife	3+	August 2020	Mobile gaming	Brazil		
CMR Surgical	3	January 2021	Robotics	United Kingdom		
Traveloka	3	January 2017	Travel	Indonesia		
ActiveCampaign	3	April 2021	Marketing	United States		
Age of Learning, Inc.	3	June 2021	Education	United States		
Automattic	3	September 2019	Internet	United States	Matt Mullenweg	
Calendly	3	January 2021	Software	United States	Tope Awotona	
Contentful	3	July 2021	Content management system	Germany		
Forter	3	May 2021	Software	Israel / United States		
Grafana Labs	3	August 2021	Software	United States		
Lucid Software	3	June 2021	Software	United States		
MessageBird	3	October 2020	Cloud communications	Netherlands		
Seismic	3	August 2021	Software	United States		
Sky Mavis	3	October 2021	Video games	Vietnam		
Souche	3	September 2018	Marketplace	China		
TradingView	3	October 2021	Finance	United Kingdom		
Aiven	3	May 2022	Data infrastructure	Finland	Hannu Valtonen, Heikki Nousiainen, Oskari Saarenmaa	
VANCL	3	February 2014	E-commerce	China		
Veepee	3	August 2022	E-commerce	France		
VIPKID	3	June 2018	Education	China		
Wefox	3	June 2021	Insurance	Germany		
Workrise	2.9	May 2021	Workforce management	United States		
DriveWealth	2.85	August 2021	Financial technology	United States		
BharatPe	2.8	August 2021	Financial technology	India	Ashneer Grover	
Icertis	2.8	March 2021	Software	India / United States	Samir Bodas, Monish Darda.	
OakNorth	2.8	February 2019	Finance	United Kingdom		
Astranis	2.8	May 2026	Space technology	United States	John Gedmark, Ryan McLinko	
Abridge	2.75	May 2025	Healthcare technology and AI	United States	Shiv Rao	
Illumio	2.75	June 2021	Cybersecurity	United States		
MasterClass	2.75	May 2021	Educational technology	United States		
Dream Games	2.75	January 2022	Gaming	Turkey		
Daangn Market	2.7	August 2021	E-commerce	South Korea		
Tridge	2.7	August 2022	Software as a service	South Korea		
Nextiva	2.7	September 2021	Software	United States		
Tradeshift	2.7	March 2021	Financial technology	United States		
Odoo	2.63	July 2021	CRM	Belgium		
AmWINS Group	2.6	October 2016	Insurance	United States		
ManoMano	2.6	July 2021	E-commerce	France		
Pendo	2.6	July 2021	Software	United States		
Sourcegraph	2.6	July 2021	Developer platform	United States		
Jumpcloud	2.56	September 2021	Software	United States		
Cato Networks	2.5	October 2021	Cybersecurity	Israel		
EasyA	2.5	May 2024	Technology	United Kingdom	Phil Kwok, Dom Kwok	
Infra.Market	2.5	August 2021	Marketplace	India	Aaditya Sharda, Souvik Sengupta	
DriveNets	2.5+	August 2022	Network operating system, Software-defined networking, Software as a service	Israel	Ido Susan, Hillel Kobrinsky	
Mews (company)	2.5	January 2026	Hospitality management platform	Czech Republic	Richard Valtr	
Monzo	2.5	June 2019	Financial services	United Kingdom		
Suno	2.45	November 2025	Artificial intelligence	United States		
Ualá	2.45	November 2019	Personal finance	Argentina		
HoneyBook	2.4	November 2021	Financial services	Israel / United States		
BitSight	2.4	September 2021	Cybersecurity	United States	Nagarjuna Venna, Stephen Boyer	
Exabeam	2.4	June 2021	Cybersecurity	United States		
Paxos	2.4	April 2021	Cryptocurrency	United States		
Mozido	2.39	October 2014	E-commerce	United States		
Starcloud	2.3	March 2026	Orbital Data Centers	United States	Philip Johnston, Ezra Feilden, Adi Oltean	
Headway	2.3	July 2024	Healthcare	United States	Andrew Adams	
Highspot	2.3	February 2021	Sales	United States		
MPL	2.3	September 2021	Mobile gaming	India		
Uzum	2.3	March 2026	E-commerce, Financial technology	Uzbekistan	Djasur Djumaev, Nikolay Seleznev, Roman Lavrentyev	
Uptake	2.3	November 2017	Asset performance management	United States		
Algolia	2.25	June 2021	Software	France / United States		
KeepTruckin	2.25	June 2021	Logistics	United States		
Acorns	2.2	May 2021	Financial technology	United States		
Bitso	2.2	May 2021	Cryptocurrency	Mexico		
Blackwall	2.2	October 2026	Cybersecurity	Estonia	Nikita Rozenberg	
Wellhub, formally Gympass	2.2	June 2021	Fitness	Brazil / United States		
Transmit Security	2.2	June 2021	Cybersecurity	Israel / United States		
Addepar	2.17	June 2021	Financial technology	United States		
Eightfold.ai	2.1+	June 2021	Artificial intelligence	United States		
Gamma	2.1	November 2025	Artificial intelligence	United States	Grant Lee	
PayFit	2.1	January 2022	Software	France	Ghislain de Fontenay, Firmin Zoccchetto, Florian Fournier	
6sense	2.1	March 2021	Artificial intelligence	United States		
C6 Bank	2.1	December 2020	Financial services	Brazil		
Mambu	2.1	January 2021	Financial technology	Germany		
Webflow	2.1	January 2021	Web development	United States		
bKash	2+	November 2021	Mobile financial services	Bangladesh	Kamal Quadir	
Bought By Many	2+	June 2021	Insurance	United Kingdom		
FlixMobility	2+	August 2019	Transportation	Germany		
Northwood Space	2	November 2026	Space technology	United States	Bridgit Mendler, Griffin Cleverly	
Tipalti	2+	October 2020	Financial technology	United States / Israel		
Hive	2	April 2021	Artificial intelligence	United States	Kevin Guo, Dmitriy Karpman	
Mural	2	July 2021	Technology	Argentina / United States	Patricio Jutard	
AppsFlyer	2	November 2020	Mobile marketing analytics	Israel / United States		
BlaBlaCar	2	April 2021	Transportation	France		
Calm	2	December 2020	Digital health	United States	Michael Acton Smith, Alex Tew	
ClickHouse	2	October 2021	Database management	United States		
Clip	2	June 2021	Financial technology	Mexico		
Cockroach Labs	2	January 2021	Database management	United States		
Divvy Homes	2	August 2021	Real estate technology	United States		
Druva	2	April 2021	Cloud computing	India / United States		
Exotec	2	August 2022	Robotics	France		
Firstp2p	2	September 2016	Financial services	China		
Formlabs	2	May 2021	3D printing	United States		
Huimin.cn	2	September 2016	B2B e-commerce	China		
Iterable	2	June 2021	Marketing	United States		
Kry	2	April 2021	Healthcare	Sweden		
Meicai.cn	2	June 2016	Agriculture, E-commerce	China		
Mynt	2	November 2021	Financial technology	Philippines		
OPay	2	August 2021	Financial technology	Nigeria		
PixVerse	2	July 2026	Artificial Intelligence	Singapore		
Simile	2	July 2026	Artificial Intelligence	United States	Joon Sung Park, Michael Bernstein, Percy Liang	
Sword Health	2	November 2021	Health	Portugal / United States	Virgílio Bento, Márcio Colunas	
Trendy International Group	2	February 2012	Fashion, Retail	China / Hong Kong		
Unqork	2	October 2020	Software development	United States		
Zerodha	2	May 2021	Financial technology	India		
Instabase	2	June 2023	Software	United States	Anant Bhardwaj	
Zilch	2	November 2021	Financial technology	United Kingdom		
Akulaku	2	February 2022	Financial technology	Indonesia		
Ankorstore	1.98	August 2022	Marketplace	France		
Avant	1.98	September 2015	Consumer finance	United States		
ThoughtSpot	1.95	August 2019	Analytics	United States		
Sanpower Group	1.93	March 2018	Holding company	China		
ZigBang	1.93	June 2022	Property technology	South Korea		
Bunq	1.9	July 2021	Financial services	Netherlands		
CoinSwitch Kuber	1.9	October 2021	Cryptocurrency	India	Ashish Singhal, Vimal Sagar Tiwari, Govind Soni	
Dfinity	1.9	August 2018	Cloud computing	Switzerland		
Prosper Marketplace	1.9	August 2015	Financial technology	United States		
Musinsa	1.89	November 2019	Fashion	South Korea		
Apus Group	1.85	August 2017	Mobile internet	China		
MEGAZONE	1.83	Aug 2022	Cloud computing	South Korea		
Landa Digital Printing	1.8	June 2018	Printing	Israel		
Lightricks	1.8	September 2021	Software development	Israel		
NantOmics	1.8	June 2015	Biotechnology	United States		
Orca Security	1.8	October 2021	Cybersecurity	Israel		
Quora	1.8	April 2017	Social network	United States		
Radiant Nuclear	1.8	December 2025	Energy Technology	United States		
Zocdoc	1.8	August 2015	Healthcare	United States		
L&P Cosmetic	1.78	March 2018	Cosmetics	South Korea		
Creditas	1.75	December 2020	Financial services	Brazil		
Spinny	1.75	November 2021	Marketplace	India	Niraj Singh, Ramanshu Mahaur, Ganesh Pawar, Mohit Gupta	
Trulioo	1.75	June 2021	Identity management	Canada		
Productboard	1.725	February 2022	Product management platform	Czech Republic	Daniel Hejl, Hubert Palan	
ADVASA	1.7	January 2023	Software	Japan		
Carsome	1.7	Jan 2022	Marketplace	Malaysia		
Dragos	1.7	October 2021	Cybersecurity	United States		
Dutchie.com	1.7	March 2021	Cannabis	United States		
GVE	1.7	January 2023	Software	Japan		
Harness	1.7	June 2021	Software	United States	Jyoti Bansal	
PAX Labs	1.7	April 2019	Cannabis	United States		
Vestiaire Collective	1.7	September 2021	Marketplace	France		
Voodoo	1.7	August 2022	Gaming	France		
Workato	1.7	December 2020	Technology	United States		
Alan	1.68	April 2021	Health technology	France		
Incredible Health	1.65	August 2022	Healthcare Technology	United States	Iman Abuzeid, Rome Portlock	
HiBob	1.65	October 2021	HR technology	Israel / United States		
Solarisbank	1.65	July 2021	Financial technology	Germany		
Wayflyer	1.6	Feb 2022	Financial technology	Ireland		
Aiways	1.6	April 2018	Electric vehicles	China		
Cresta	1.6	March 2022	Artificial intelligence	United States	Sebastian Thrun, Tim Shi, Zayd Enam	
Clari	1.6	March 2021	Software	United States		
Clio	1.6	April 2021	Legal technology	Canada		
Cognite	1.6	May 2021	Software	Norway		
HomeLight	1.6	September 2021	Real estate	United States		
Nord Security	1.6	April 2022	VPN service	Lithuania	Tom Okman, Eimantas Sabaliauskas, Jonas Karklys	
SafetyCulture	1.6	May 2021	Technology	Australia	Luke Anear	
SmartHR	1.6	May 2021	HR technology	Japan		
Unite Us	1.6	March 2021	Healthcare	United States		
Vanta	1.6	June 2022	Cybersecurity	United States	Christina Cacioppo	
CureFit	1.56	November 2021		India	Mukesh Bansal, Ankit Nagori	
HeartFlow	1.5+	February 2018	Healthcare	United States		
KreditBee	1.5	April 2026	Financial technology	India	Madhusudan Ekambaram	
Airbyte	1.5	December 2021	Software	United States	Michel Tricot, John Lafleur	
Andela	1.5	September 2021	Education	Nigeria / United States		
Culture Amp	1.5	July 2021	Software	Australia		
Devo, Inc.	1.5	October 2021	Software	Spain		
Granola	1.5	March 2026	Software	United Kingdom	Christopher Pedregal, Sam Stephenson	
ID.me	1.5	March 2021	Identity verification service	United States		
Ledger	1.5	June 2021	Cryptocurrency	France		
Matillion	1.5	September 2021	Data analytics	United Kingdom		
MOLOCO	1.5	August 2021	Advertising technology	United States		
Molbio Diagnostics	1.5	February 2023	Medical device	India		
Mu Sigma	1.5	February 2013	Management consulting	India / United States		
NextSilicon	1.5	June 2021	Semiconductors	Israel		
NotCo	1.5	July 2021	Food technology	Chile		
Nous Research	1.5	October 2026	Artificial intelligence	United States		
Podium	1.5	August 2019	Software	United States		
Remote	1.5	July 2021	Software	Portugal / United States	Marcelo Lebre, Job van der Voort	
Render	1.5	February 17, 2026	Cloud computing	United States	Anurag Goel	
Spring Rain Software	1.5	June 2016		China		
Starling Bank	1.5	March 2021	Financial technology	United Kingdom		
5ire	1.5+	July 2022	Technology	India	Pratik Gauri	
Tujia.com	1.5	October 2017	Justin Luo and Melissa Yang	China		
ZBJ.com	1.5	June 2015		China		
Ascend Money	1.5	September 2021	Financial technology	Thailand		
Hellobike	1.47	June 2018		China		
Suning Sports	1.47	July 2018	Holding company	China		
Eka Robotics	1.45	October 2026	Robotics	United States	Pulkit Agrawal, Tuomas Haarnoja	
Koudai Gouwu	1.45	October 2014		China		
M1 Finance	1.45	July 2021	Financial technology	United States		
Odyssey	1.45	June 2026	Artificial intelligence	United States	Oliver Cameron, Jeff Hawke	
Zeta	1.45	May 2021	Financial technology	India	Bhavin Turakhia, Ramki Gaddipati	
Einride	1.44	April 2022	Technology	Sweden		
Eucalyptus Health	1.4	2026	Health	Australia	Tim Doyle Charlie Gearside Benny Kleist Alexey Mitko	
Deliverect	1.4	January 2022	Ordering software for POS	Belgium		
Away	1.4	May 2019	Retail	United States		
OneCard	1.4+	July 2022	Financial technology	India	Anurag Sinha, Rupesh Kumar, Vaibhav Hathi	
Bucketplace	1.4	May 2022	Interior design	South Korea		
Cabify	1.4	January 2018	Transportation	Spain		
Chargebee	1.4	April 2021	Financial technology	India / United States		
Epidemic Sound	1.4	March 2021	Music	Sweden	Peer Åström, David Stenmarck, Oscar Höglund, Jan Zachrisson	
Five Star Finance	1.4	March 2021	Financial services	India		
IAD	1.4	Oct 2021	Real estate	France		
NetDocuments	1.4	May 2021	Software	United States		
Panther Labs, Inc.	1.4	December 2021	Computer security	United States	Jack Naglieri	
Pristyn Care	1.4	December 2021	Health technology	India		
QOMPLX, Inc.	1.4	March 2021	Computer security	United States		
Rebel Foods	1.4	October 2021	Ghost kitchen	India		
Slash	1.4	April 2026	Financial technology	United States	Victor Cardenas, Kevin Bai	
Stash	1.4	February 2021	Financial technology	United States		
Symphony	1.4	June 2019	Software	United States		
Voyager	1.4	April 2022	Financial technology	Philippines		
Yotpo	1.4	March 2021	Marketing	Israel / United States		
Miro	1.36	September 2026	Software	United States	Andrey Khusid	
RIDI	1.33	August 2021	E-commerce	South Korea		
Zetwerk	1.33	August 2021		India		
GPClub	1.32	December 2018		South Korea		
Corgi	1.3	May 2026	Financial technology	United States	Nico Laqua, Emily Yuan	
DistroKid	1.3	August 2021	Music	United States		
ETCP	1.3	October 2016		China		
Feedzai	1.3	March 2021	Artificial intelligence	Portugal / United States	Nuno Sebastião	
G2	1.3	June 2021	Technology	United States	Tim Handorf, Godard Abel, Matt Gorniak, Mark Myers, Mike Wheeler	
Innovaccer	1.3	February 2021	Health care	India / United States	Abhinav Shashank, Kanav Hasija, Sandeep Gupta	
Konfio	1.3	September 2021	Financial services	Mexico		
Kr Space	1.3	June 2018		China		
Yugabyte	1.3	October 2021	Database management	United States		
Airtable	1.28	August 2026	Collaborative software	United States	Howie Liu, Andrew Ofstad, Emmett Nicholas	
Cart.com	1.27	June 2023	Commerce and logistics	United States	Omair Tariq, Remington Tonar	
Incode	1.25	December 2021	Technology	Mexico		
Applied Intuition	1.25	October 2020	Software	United States		
BigID	1.25	May 2018	Cybersecurity	Israel / United States		
ezCater	1.25	April 2019		United States	Stefania Mallett, Briscoe Rodgers	
Iwjw	1.25	November 2015		China		
Marshmallow	1.25	September 2021	Insurance	United Kingdom		
Rec Room	1.25	March 2021	Video games	United States		
Wabi	1.25	October 2026	Artificial intelligence		Eugenia Kuyda	
Spiber	1.22	September 2021	Biotechnology	Japan		
Insider	1.22	March 2022	AI-powered SaaS	Turkey	Hande Çilingir	
Merama	1.2	December 2021	E-commerce	Mexico		
Ada	1.2	May 2021	Software	Canada		
Alation	1.2	June 2021	Software	United States	Satyen Sangani, Aaron Kalb, Feng Niu, and Venky Ganti	
Axonius	1.2	March 2021	Cybersecurity	Israel / United States		
CarDekho	1.2	October 2021	Marketplace	India		
Copado	1.2	September 2021	Software	Spain / United States		
Dental Monitoring	1.2	October 2021	Healthcare	France		
Deutsche Health	1.2	August 2020	Biotech/Medical	Germany / Russia		
Droom	1.2	July 2021	Marketplace	India	Sandeep Aggarwal	
Fair	1.2	December 2018		United States		
FloQast	1.2	July 2021	Software	United States		
Forto	1.2	June 2021	Software	Germany		
Intercom	1.2	March 2018	Software	United States		
Kyriba	1.2	October 2021	Cloud software	France		
Mindtickle	1.2	August 2021	Software as a service	India		
MyGlamm	1.2	November 2021	E-commerce	India		
Triple-1	1.2	January 2023	Blockchain	Japan		
Rohlik	1.2	June 2021	Retail	Czech Republic		
upGrad	1.2	August 2021	Educational technology	India		
Warhound	1.2	October 2026	Biotechnology	United States	Ben Lamm, Palmer Luckey	
Workhuman	1.2	June 2020	Software	Ireland		
HappyRobot	1.2	August 2026	Artificial Intelligence	United States		
Sysdig	1.18	April 2021	Cybersecurity	United States		
Deputy	1.1	March 2024	Workforce management software	Australia	Ashik Ahmed and Steve Shelley	
3DOM Alliance, Inc.	1.1	January 2023	Battery manufacturing	Japan		
Acko	1.1	October 2021	Insurance	India		
Apna	1.1	September 2021		India		
Carousell	1.1	September 2021	Marketplace	Singapore		
CoinDCX	1.1	August 2021	Cryptocurrency	India	Sumit Gupta, Neeraj Khandelwal	
Purplle	1.1	June 2022	E-Commerce	India	Manish Taneja, Rahul Dash	
GlobalBees	1.1	December 2021		India		
Luoji Siwei	1.1	September 2017		China		
Nexthink	1.1	February 2021	Technology	Switzerland		
Sisense	1.1	January 2020	Business intelligence	Israel / United States		
Drools	1.1	January 2023	Pet food	India		
SmartNews	1.1	August 2019		Japan		
Substack	1.1	July 2025	Media and Publishing	United States	Chris Best, Hamish McKenzie, Jairaj Sethi	
Trax	1.1	May 2019		Singapore / Israel		
Virta Health	1.1	December 2020	Healthcare	United States		
YouniteD	1.1	December 2022	Financial services	France	Charles Égly, Geoffroy Guigou	
Benevity	1.1	December 2020	Software as a service	Canada	Bryan de Lottinville	
Zego	1.1	March 2021	Insurance	United Kingdom		
Substrate	1+	October 2025	Semiconductor	United States	James Proud	
Aikido Security	1+	January 2026	Cybersecurity	Belgium	Willem Delbare	
Character.ai	1+	March 2023	Artificial Intelligence	United States	Daniel De Freitas, Noam Shazeer	
Pentera	1+	January 2022	Cybersecurity	Israel	Arik Liberzon, Arik Faingold	
VectorBuilder, Inc.	1+	July 26, 2023	Biotechnology	United States	Bruce Lahn, Kristofer Mussar	
Emplifi	1+	March 2022	Technology	United States, United Kingdom and Europe		
Gymshark	1+	August 2020	Sportswear	United Kingdom	Ben Francis, Lewis Morgan	
Kopi Kenangan	1+	December 2021	Coffee shop	Indonesia		
Clara	1+	December 2021	Financial technology	Mexico		
ClassDojo	1.25	July 2022	Education Technology	United States	Sam Chaudhary, Liam Don	
58 Daojia	1+	October 2015		China		
Acronis	1+	September 2019	Software	Singapore / Switzerland		
Aircall	1+	October 2021	Cloud	France		
Ajaib	1+	October 2021	Financial technology	Indonesia		
Amber Group	1+	June 2021	Cryptocurrency	Hong Kong		
AppDirect	1+	October 2015		United States		
Aqua Security	1+	March 2021	Cloud computing	Israel		
Asia First Media	1+	September 2019	Media	Japan		
Assent Compliance	1+	January 2022	Supply chain management	Canada		
Krutrim	1+	26 January 2024	AI / GPT	India		
Beibei	1+	June 2016	E-commerce	China		
Blacksmith	1	October 2026	Software	United States	Aditya Jayaprakash	
Bluecore	1+	August 2021	E-commerce	United States		
Bringg	1+	June 2021	Logistics	Israel		
Cadence Solutions, Inc.	1+	December 2021	Healthcare	United States	Chris Altchek	
Carro	1+	June 2021	Marketplace	Singapore		
Chubao Technology	1+	May 2017		China		
Dash0	1	March 2026	Software as a service	United States	Marcel Birkner, Ben Blackmore, Miel Donkers, Michele Mancioppi, Mirko Novakovic	
Daytona	1	October 2026	Cloud computing	United States	Ivan Burazin	
Dt Dream	1+	June 2017		China		
Dunamu	1+	July 2021	Financial technology	South Korea		
DXY	1+	April 2018		China		
Earnix	1+	February 2021	Financial technology	Israel		
Ebanx	1+	October 2019	Financial services	Brazil		
EMPG	1+	June 2020	Real estate technology	United Arab Emirates		
eSentire	1+	Feb 2022	Cybersecurity	Canada / United States		
Flash Express	1+	June 2021	Logistics	Thailand		
Flexe	1+	July 2022	Logistics	United States	Karl Siebrecht	
FreshBooks	1+	August 2021	Accounting software	Canada		
FXiaoKe	1+	January 2018		China		
Gelato	1+	August 2021		Norway		
GeoComply	1+	March 2021	Cybersecurity	Canada		
GetYourGuide	1+	May 2019	Travel	Germany		
Glance	1+	December 2020	Artificial intelligence	India		
Go1	1+	July 2021	Education	Australia		
Gousto	1+	November 2020	Meal kit	United Kingdom		
Grover	1+	April 2022	E-commerce	Germany	Michael Cassau	
Hailo	1+	June 2021	Electronics	Israel		
HighRadius	1+	January 2020	Software as a service	India / United States		
Flo Health	1+	July 2024	Health Technology	Lithuania, Belarus	Dmitry Gurski, Yuri Gurski	
Huikedu Group	1+	May 2018		China		
iCarbonX	1+	July 2016	Healthcare	China		
IFood	1+	November 2018	Food delivery	Brazil		
IGAWorks	1+	Aug 2021	Advertising technology	South Korea		
Improbable	1+	May 2017	Cloud computing	United Kingdom		
Infobip	1+	July 2020	Cloud communications	Croatia	Silvio Kutić, Izabel Jelenić, Roberto Kutić	
Injective	1+	April 2021	Financial technology	United States	Eric Chen, Albert Chon	
InMobi	1+	May 2017	Internet	India	Naveen Tewari, Mohit Saxena, Amit Gupta and Abhay Singhal	
Ivalua	1+	May 2020		France		
Jollychic	1+	May 2018		China		
JoyTunes	1+	June 2021	Music	Israel		
Just Salad	1+	February 2025	Restaurants	United States	Nick Kenner	
Kendra Scott LLC	1+	December 2016	Jewelery	United States	Kendra Scott	
Kitopi	1+	July 2021	Ghost kitchen	United Arab Emirates		
Klook	1+	April 2019		Hong Kong		
LetsGetChecked	1+	June 2021	Healthcare	Ireland		
Lydia	1+	August 2022	Finance	France		
LinkSure Network (WiFi Master Key)	1+	January 2015		China		
LMAX Group	1+	July 2021	Financial technology	United Kingdom		
Locus Robotics	1+	February 2021	Robotics	United States		
Loft Brazil Technology	1+	January 2020	Real estate	Brazil		
Lunar	1+	July 2021	Financial technology	Denmark		
Loggi	1+	June 2019	Logistics	Brazil		
Lookout	1+	August 2014	Cybersecurity	United States		
MadeiraMadeira	1+	January 2021	Furniture	Brazil		
Maimai	1+	August 2018		China		
Masterworks	1+	November 2025	Financial Technology	United States	Scott Lynn	
Matrixport	1+	August 2021	Cryptocurrency	Singapore		
Meero	1+	June 2019	Internet	France		
Mensa Brands	1+	November 2021	E-commerce	India		
Mia.com	1+	October 2016		China		
MindMaze	1+	February 2016		Switzerland		
MobileCoin	1+	August 2021	Cryptocurrency	United States		
Mofang Apartment	1+	April 2016		China		
Moglix	1+	May 2021	E-commerce	India / Singapore	Rahul Garg	
Moka	1+	November 2021	Human resource management	China		
Morning Consult	1+	June 2021		United States		
Ninja Van	1+	September 2021	Logistics	Singapore		
Nium	1+	July 2021	Financial technology	Singapore		
NoBroker	1+	November 2021		India	Akhil Gupta, Amit Agarwal, Saurabh Garg	
Kredivo	1+	January 2022	Financial technology	Indonesia		
OCSiAl	1+	March 2019	Nanotechnology	Luxembourg		
Opn (Synqa)	1+	May 2022	Financial technology	Japan	Jun Hasegawa, Ezra Don Harinsut	
OrCam	1+	February 2018	Health	Israel		
PandaDoc	1+	September 2021	Software as a service	United States	Mikita Mikado, Sergey Barysiuk	
Pantheon Systems	1+	July 2021	WebOps	United States		
PatSnap	1+	March 2021	Intellectual property	Singapore		
Picsart	1+	August 2021	Graphic design	Armenia / United States	Hovhannes Avoyan, Artavazd Mehrabyan, Mikayel Vardanyan	
Playco	1+	September 2020	Mobile gaming	Japan		
Redis Labs	1+	August 2020	Software	Israel / United States		
REEF Technology	1+	November 2020	Real estate technology	United States		
Quizlet	1+	May 2020	Educational technology	United States		
Revolution Precrafted	1+	October 2017	Architecture	Philippines		
Sennder	1+	January 2021	Logistics	Germany		
Shift Technology	1+	May 2021	Artificial intelligence	France		
Shippo	1+	June 2021		United States	Laura Behrens Wu, Simon Kreuz	
Sift	1+	April 2021	Fraud prevention	United States		
Slice	1+	November 2021	Financial technology	India		
SmartAsset	1+	June 2021	Financial technology	United States		
SmartMore	1+	June 2021	Artificial intelligence	China		
Snapdeal	1+	May 2017	E-commerce	India	Rohit Bansal, Kunal Bahl	
Socket	1+	May 2026	Security software	United States	Feross Aboukhadijeh	
Spendesk	1+	August 2022	Financial software	France		
Splashtop	1+	January 2021	Software	United States		
Staffbase	1.1	March 2022	Software as a service	Germany	Frank Wolf, Lutz Gerlach, Martin Böhringer	
Swile	1+	October 2021	Financial services	France		
Synthesia	1+	June 2023	Artificial intelligence	United Kingdom	Lourdes Agapito, Matthias Niessner, Victor Riparbelli, Steffen Tjerrild	
Taxfix	1+	April 2022	Fintech / Tax software	Germany	Mathis Büchi, Lino Teuteberg	
Tekion	1+	October 2020	Software as a service	United States		
Tezign	1+	October 2021	Software	China		
Thatch	1	September 2026	Individual health benefits	United States	Adam Stevenson, Chris Ellis	
Tongdun Technology	1+	October 2017		China		
Town	1+	October 2026	Artificial intelligence	United States	Jean-Denis Greze	
Tractable	1+	June 2021	Artificial intelligence	United Kingdom		
Tresata	1+	October 2018		United States		
TrueLayer	1+	September 2021	Financial technology	United Kingdom		
Trustly	1+	June 2020	Financial technology	Sweden		
Turo	1+	July 2019	Car sharing	United States		
Vagaro	1+	November 2021	Software as a service	United States	Fred Fady Helou	
VerSe Innovation	1+	December 2020	Technology	India	Virendra Gupta	
Visier	1+	June 2021	Technology	Canada		
volocopter	1+	March 2021	Transportation	Germany		
Vox Media	1+	August 2015	Digital media	United States		
VTS	1+	May 2019		United States		
Wacai.com	1+	July 2018		China		
WeLab	1+	December 2019	Financial technology	Hong Kong		
Womai	1+	October 2015		China		
Xendit	1+	September 2021	Financial technology	Indonesia		
Xiaozhu.com	1+	November 2017		China		
YH Global	1+	September 2017	Telecommunications	China		
Yidian Zixun	1+	October 2017		China		
Yitu Technology	1+	July 2018		China		
YunQuNa	1+	May 2021	Logistics	China		
Zenoti	1+	December 2020	Software company	India / United States		
Zhuanzhuan	1+	April 2017		China		
Zuoyebang	1+	July 2018		China		
eFishery	1+	May 2023	Aquaculture	Indonesia		
LINE MAN Wongnai	1+	September 2022	E-commerce, Food delivery	Thailand		
ReliaQuest	1+	December 2021	Cybersecurity	United States	Brian Murphy	
DANA	1+	September 2022	Financial technology	Indonesia		
Nagad	1+	July 2023	Mobile financial services	Bangladesh	Tanvir A Mishuk	
Ecovadis	1	August 2022	Environmental, social, and corporate governance	France		
Scandit	1	February 2022	Software	Switzerland	Samuel Mueller, Christian Floerkemeier, Christof Roduner	
BlueVoyant	1+	February 2022	Cybersecurity	United States	Jim Rosenthal, Chris Meissner, Jim Thompson, and Arun Sankaran	
Payhawk	1+	March 2022	Financial technology	Bulgaria		
Voi	1+	April 2022		Sweden		
Neo Financial	1	May 2022	Financial technology	Canada	Andrew Chau, Jeff Adamson, Kris Read	
Stytch	1	November 2021	Cybersecurity	United States	Reed McGinley-Stempel, Julianna Lamb	
Epassi	1+	December 2023	Employee benefits platform	Finland	Risto Virkkala	
HMD Global	1+	August 2020	Mobile Devices	Finland	Jean-Francois Baril	
IQM	1	July 2022	Quantum Computing	Finland	Jan Goetz, Mikko Möttönen, Kuan Yen Tan, Juha Vartiainen	
Hostaway	1	December 2024	Vacation rental software platform	Finland	Marcus Räder, Saber Kordestanchi, Mikko Nurminen	
Papara	1	July 2023	Fintech	Turkey	Ahmed Faruk Karslı	
MNT-Halan	1+	February 2023	Fintech	Egypt	Mounir Nakhla, Ahmed Mohsen	

== Former unicorns ==
These companies were formerly unicorns, but exited the list due to IPO or acquisitions by a company or by a group of companies:

Company	Last valuation (US$ billions)	Valuation date	Exit date	Exit reason	Exit valuation (US$ billions)	Country	Founders
SpaceX	1250	February 2026	June 2026	IPO	1770	United States	Elon Musk
Anthropic	965	May 2026	November 2026	IPO	1500	United States	Dario Amodei, Daniela Amodei, Jared Kaplan, Jack Clark, Ben Mann, Tom Brown, Sam McCandlish, Chris Olah
Uber	72	August 2018	May 2019	IPO	82.4	United States	Travis Kalanick, Garett Camp
Shein	66	May 2023	September 2026	IPO	26.5	China	Chris Xu
DiDi	62	July 2019	June 2021	IPO	73	China	Cheng Wei
Cursor	29	November 2025	June 2026	Acquired	60	United States	Michael Truell, Sualeh Asif, Arvid Lunnemark and Aman Sanger
Facebook	50	January 2011	May 2012	IPO	104	United States	Mark Zuckerberg, Eduardo Saverin, Andrew McCollum, Chris Hughes, Dustin Moskovitz
Xiaomi	45	April 2015	July 2018	IPO	70	China	Lei Jun
Alibaba	42	June 2016	September 2014	IPO	238	China	Jack Ma
Lufax	39.4	March 2019	October 2020	IPO	33	China	
UiPath	35	February 2021	April 2021	IPO	29	United States / Romania	Daniel Dines and Marius Tîrcă
Airbnb	31	March 2017	December 2020	IPO	100	United States	Brian Chesky, Nathan Blecharczyk, Joe Gebbia
Nubank	30.25	June 2021	December 2021	IPO	45	Brazil	David Velez, Edward Wible, Cristina Junqueira
Meituan-Dianping	30	October 2017	September 2018	IPO	53	China	
Kuaishou	28	December 2019	January 2021	IPO	60.9	China	Su Hua, Cheng Yixiao
Instacart	24	March 2022	September 2023	IPO	11	United States	Apoorva Mehta, Max Mullen, Brandon Leonardo
Coreweave	23	March 2025	March 2025		23	United States	
J&T Express	20	October 2023	October 2023	IPO	20	Indonesia	Jet Lee, Tony Chen
CATL	20.0	March 2018	June 2018	IPO	12.3	China	
Tencent Music	18	January 2018	December 2018	IPO	21.3	China	
DoorDash	16	June 2020	December 2020	IPO	32.4	United States	Tony Xu, Stanley Tang, Andy Fang and Evan Moore
Snap Inc	19.3	May 2016	March 2017	IPO	24	United States	Evan Spiegel, Bobby Murphy, Reggie Brown
Flipkart	15.5	May 2015	May 2018	Acquired	22	India	Sachin Bansal, Binny Bansal
Paytm	3.2	February 2024	November 2021	IPO	20	India	Vijay Shekhar Sharma
Lyft	15.1	June 2018	March 2019	IPO	24.0	United States	Logan Green, John Zimmer
Adyen	15.1	March 2018	June 2018	IPO	8.3	Netherlands	Pieter van der Does, Arnout Schuijff
Pinduoduo	15	April 2018	July 2018	IPO	60	China	Colin Huang
Grab	14	March 2019	December 2021	SPAC merger	40	Singapore	Anthony Tan, Tan Hooi Ling
Pinterest	13.0	July 2018	April 2019	IPO	10.0	United States	Ben Silbermann, Paul Sciarra, Evan Sharp
Snowflake	12.4	Feb 2020	Dec 2020	IPO	33	United States	Benoit Dageville, Thierry Cruanes, Marcin Zukowski
Robinhood	11.7	September 2020	July 2021	IPO	26.7	United States	Vladimir Tenev, Baiju Bhatt
Figma	10	June 2021	July 2025	IPO	19.3	United States	Dylan Field and Evan Wallace
Dropbox	10	January 2014	March 2018	IPO	12	United States	Drew Houston, Arash Ferdowsi
Squarespace	10	March 2021	May 2021	Direct listing	7.4	United States	Anthony Casalena
Gojek	10	April 2019	May 2021	Merger to GoTo	10.5	Indonesia	Nadiem Makarim, Kevin Aluwi
Zynga	9.1	February 2011	December 2011	IPO	7	United States	Mark Pincus, Eric Schiermeyer, Justin Waldron, Michael Luxton, Steve Schoettler, and Andrew Trader
Coupang	9	November 2018	March 2021	IPO	58	South Korea	Bom Kim
Spotify	8.53	March 2016	April 2018	Direct listing	30	Sweden	Daniel Ek, Martin Lorentzon
Skype	8.5	May 2011	September 2015	Acquired	2.6	Sweden	Niklas Zennström and Janus Friis
Wolt	8.1	November 2021	September 2021	Acquired	8.1	Finland	Miki Kuusi, Elias Aalto, Mika Matikainen, Oskari Pétas, Lauri Andler, Juhani Mykkänen
Toast	8	November 2020	September 2021	IPO	20	United States	
Twitter	8	September 2011	November 2013	IPO	14.2	United States	Jack Dorsey, Noah Glass, Biz Stone, Evan Williams
Coinbase	8	October 2018	April 2021	IPO	65	United States	Brian Armstrong, Fred Ehrsam
Argo AI	7.25	July 2020	October 2022	Defunct		United States	Bryan Salesky and Peter Rander
Tokopedia	7	December 2018	May 2021	Merger to GoTo	7.5	Indonesia	William Tanuwijaya, Leontinus Alpha Edison
Deliveroo	7.0	January 2021	March 2021	IPO	10.5	United Kingdom	Will Shu, Greg Orlowski
Roivant Sciences	7	November 2018	September 2021	SPAC merger	7.3	Switzerland	
Slack Technologies	7.0	August 2018		IPO		United States	Stewart Butterfield, Cal Henderson
WeWork	7	November 2019	October 2021	SPAC merger	9	United States	Adam Newmann, Miguel McKelvey
Compass, Inc.	6.4	July 2019	April 2021	IPO	7.0	United States	
Gitlab	6	January 2021	October 2021	IPO	17	Ukraine	Dmytro Zaporozhets; Sytse "Sid" Sijbrandij
Square	6	October 2014	November 2015	IPO	3.6	United States	Jack Dorsey, Jim McKelvey
SoFi	6	May 2020	May 2021	SPAC merger	8.65	United States	
Zomato	5.4	February 2021	July 2021	IPO	8.7	India	Deepinder Goyal
Samsara	5.4	May 2020	December 2021	IPO	11.6	United States	Sanjit Biswas, John Bicket
Stemcentrx	5	September 2015	April 2016	Acquired	5.8	United States	
Nowports	1.1	May 2022	IPO	Logistics	5.0	Uruguay / Mexico	Alfonso de los Ríos, Maximiliano Casal
dLocal	6.1	April 2021	June 2021	IPO	Uruguay		
Groupon	4.75	December 2010	November 2011	IPO	13	United States	Eric Lefkofsky, Brad Keywell, Andrew Mason
Krafton	5	August 2021	August 2021	IPO	25	South Korea	
Confluent	4.5	April 2020	June 2021	IPO	9	United States	Jay Kreps, Neha Narkhede, Jun Rao
Ucar	4.4	March 2017	July 2016	IPO	5.5	China	
Zalando	4.03	November 2013	October 2014	IPO	6.7	Germany	
Amplitude	4	June 2021	September 2021	IPO	5	United States	
Peloton	4.0	August 2018	September 2019	IPO	8.1	United States	
Credit Karma	4	March 2018	December 2020	Acquired	8.1	United States	
Ginkgo Bioworks	4	September 2019	September 2021	SPAC merger	2.5	United States	
Lending Club	3.8	August 2014	December 2014	IPO	8.5	United States	Renaud Laplanche
Sea Limited	3.7	March 2016	October 2017	IPO	5.3	Singapore	
Freshworks	3.5	November 2019	September 2021	IPO	10.13	India / United States	Girish Mathrubootham, Shan Krishnasamy
Bukalapak	3.5	April 2021	August 2021	IPO	6	Indonesia	Achmad Zaky, Fajrin Rasyid, Nugroho Herucahyono
Wise	3.5	May 2019	July 2021	Direct listing	11	United Kingdom	
Zhihu	3.5	August 2019	March 2021	IPO	5.3	China	
Atlassian	3.3	April 2014	December 2015	IPO	7.02	Australia	
e-Shang Redwood	3.25	July 2017	October 2019	IPO	6.7	China	
Udemy	3.25	November 2020	October 2021	IPO	4	United States	Oktay Caglar, Gagan Biyani, Eren Bali
SmileDirectClub	3.2	October 2018	September 2019	IPO	8.9	United States	
Zoox	3.2	July 2018	July 2020	Acquired	1.3	United States	Tim Kentley-Klay, Jesse Levinson
Oscar Health	3.2	March 2018	March 2021	IPO	7.9	United States	
Cloudflare	3	March 2019	September 2019	IPO	4	United States	Matthew Prince, Lee Holloway, and Michelle Zatlyn
Delhivery	3	May 2021	May 2022	IPO	4.6	India	
Pure Storage	3	August 2014	October 2015	IPO	3.1	United States	
Maoyan	3.0	November 2017	January 2019	IPO	2.2	China	
Jia.com	3	February 2015	July 2018	IPO	0.74	China	
Mogu	3	January 2016	December 2018	IPO	1.3	China	
Paytm Mall	3	July 2019	May 2022	Devaluation	0.013	India	
Luckin Coffee	2.9	April 2019	May 2019	IPO		China	Lu Zhengyao, Jenny Qian Zhiya
Pivotal	2.8	May 2016	April 2018	IPO	3.9	United States	
Monday.com	2.7	May 2020	June 2021	IPO	6.8	Israel	Roy Mann, Eran Kampf and Eran Zinman
Cazoo	2.6	September 2020	August 2021	SPAC merger	8	United Kingdom	
Woowa Brothers	2.6	March 2018	December 2019	Acquired	4	South Korea	
Ucommune	2.6	August 2018	November 2020	SPAC merger	0.769	China	
Coursera	2.5	July 2020	March 2021	IPO	4.3	United States	Andrew Ng and Daphne Koller
Cambricon	2.5	June 2018	June 2020	IPO		China	
The Hut Group	2.5	August 2017	September 2020	IPO	5.8	United Kingdom	
Postmates	2.4	September 2019	December 2020	Acquired	2.65	United States	
Box	2.4	July 2014	January 2015	IPO	1.67	United States	Aaron Levie, Dylan Smith, Sam Ghods, Jeff Queisser
Mercari	2.4	March 2018	June 2018	IPO	3.7	Japan	
Kingsoft	2.4	January 2018	May 2020	IPO	3.7	China	
Sportradar	2.4	July 2018	September 2021	IPO	21	Switzerland	
PolicyBazaar	2.4	March 2021	November 2021	IPO	6	India	Yashish Dahiya, Alok Bansal, Avaneesh Nirjar
GoPro	2.25	December 2012	June 2014	IPO	2.96	United States	Nick Woodman
Babytree	2.19	May 2018	November 2018	IPO	1.47	China	
Roku, Inc.	2.1	September 2017	September 2017	IPO	2.1	United States	Anthony Wood
Three Squirrels	2.09	September 2015	July 2019	IPO	0.86	China	
AppDynamics	2.05	November 2015	January 2017	Acquired	3.7	United States	
AvidXchange	2	January 2020	October 2021	IPO	4.9	United States	
Wayfair	2	March 2014	October 2014	IPO	2.4	United States	
NantHealth	2	January 2016	June 2016	IPO	1.7	United States	
Meitu	2	December 2014	December 2016	IPO	4.6	China	
Nutanix	2	September 2016	September 2016	IPO	2.21	United States	
Uxin	2.0	January 2017	June 2018	IPO		China	
Careem	2	October 2018	March 2019	Acquired	3.1	United Arab Emirates/Pakistan	Mudassir Sheikha, Magnus Olsson
AppLovin	2	July 2018	April 2021	IPO	28.6	United States	
ReNew Power	2	February 2017	August 2021	SPAC merger	4.5	India	Sumant Sinha
Deliverr	2	November 2021	May 2022	Acquired	2.1	United States	Harish Abbott, Michael Krakaris
Auth0	1.92	July 2020	March 2021	Acquired	6.5	Argentina / United States	
Mobileye	1.9	July 2013	August 2014	IPO	7.6	Israel	
WalkMe	1.9	December 2019	June 2021	IPO	2.6	Israel / United States	
Avito.ru	1.82	February 2014	January 2019	Acquired	1.16	Russia	
23andMe	1.75	September 2017	June 2021	SPAC merger	3.5	United States	
IronSource	1.75	October 2019	June 2021	SPAC merger	11	Israel	
MedMen	1.65	February 2018	May 2018	Reverse takeover	2.0	United States	
Better Place	1.6	November 2012	July 2013	Acquired	0.012	United States	
Loom	1.53	May 2021	Video messaging	Acquired	0.975	United States	
Farfetch	1.5	May 2016	September 2018	IPO	6.2	Portugal / United Kingdom	José Neves
Freshly	1.5	October 2020	October 2020	Acquired	1.5	United States	
MuleSoft	1.5	May 2015	March 2015	IPO, Acquired	6.5	United States	
Jet.com	1.5	November 2015	August 2016	Acquired	3.3	United States	
LivingSocial	1.5	February 2013	October 2016	Acquired		United States	
WhatsApp	1.5	July 2013	February 2014	Acquired	19	United States	Brian Acton, Jan Koum
Lakala	1.5	June 2015	April 2019	IPO		China	
UCloud	1.5	June 2018	January 2020	IPO	1.9	China	
One Medical	1.5	August 2018	January 2020	IPO	1.7	United States	
Quikr	1.5	October 2015	February 2020	Devalued	0.57	India	Pranay Chulet
Letgo	1.5	August 2018	March 2020	Acquired		Spain / United States	
Ninebot	1.5	October 2017	October 2020	IPO		China	
DouYu	1.5	March 2018	July 2019	IPO	3.73	China	
Proteus Digital Health	1.5	February 2016	July 2020	Bankruptcy		United States	
Duolingo	1.5	December 2019	July 2021	IPO	3.6	United States	
Tuandaiwang	1.46	May 2017	April 2019	Bankruptcy		China	
HomeAway	1.4	October 2010	November 2016	Acquired	3.9	United States	
Hike Messenger	1.4	August 2016	January 2021	Defunct		India	Kavin Bharti Mittal
Deezer	1.4	January 2016	September 2016	Acquired		France	
Jasper	1.35	April 2014	February 2016	Acquired	1.4	United States	
Paidy	1.32	March 2021	September 2021	Acquired	2.7	Japan	
eFront	1.3	March 2019	May 2019	Acquired	1.3	France	
Sonder Corp.	1.3	July 2020	January 2022	SPAC merger	1.9	United States	
Sunrun	1.3	July 2016	August 2015	IPO	1.4	United States	
Solstice	1.7	July 2018	December 2009	Acquired	1.3	United States	
Darktrace	1.25	May 2018	April 2021	IPO	2.37	United Kingdom	
Okta	1.2	March 2017	April 2017	IPO	2.1	United States	
Good Technology	1.2	September 2014	September 2015	Acquired	0.425	United States	
BigBasket	1.2	March 2019	February 2021	Acquired by TATA Group IPO (coming soon by 2024 - 2025 FY)	1.8	India	V. S. Sudhakar, Hari Menon, Vipul Parekh, Abhinay Choudhari, V. S. Ramesh
Nykaa	1.2	April 2020	November 2021	IPO	7.4	India	Falguni Nayar
HeadSpin	1.16	February 2020	August 2020	Devalued	0.25	United States	
Fab	1.15	August 2013	March 2015	Acquired	0.015	United States	
Gilt Groupe	1.15	February 2015	January 2016	Acquired	0.25	United States	
Vonage	1.11	August 2014	May 2006	IPO	2.65	United States	
ShopClues	1.1	January 2016	October 2019	Acquired	0.1	India	Sanjay Sethi, Sandeep Aggarwal, Radhika Aggarwal
Global Fashion Group	1.1	July 2016	July 2019	IPO		Luxembourg	
TuSimple	1.1	February 2019	April 2021	IPO	8.5	United States	
Wheels Up	1.1	August 2019	July 2021	SPAC merger	2.1	United States	
Zulily	1.09	November 2012	October 2015	Acquired	2.4	United States	
Coupa	1.08	June 2015	October 2016	IPO	1.68	United States	
LinkedIn	1.06	February 2016	May 2011	IPO	4.3	United States	Reid Hoffman, Eric Ly
Twilio	1.03	July 2015	June 2016	IPO	1.2	United States	Jeff Lawson, John Wolthuis, Evan Cooke
SimpliVity	1.03	March 2015	January 2017	Acquired	0.65	United States	
Coveo	1.1	November 2019	November 2021	IPO	1.7	Canada	
Kabam	1+	December 2016	February 2017	Acquired	0.8	Canada	
Rent the Runway	1+	March 2019	October 2021	IPO	1.4	United States	
CRF Health	1	July 2018	July 2018	Acquisition	1	Finland	Timo Ahopelto, Jarkko Joki-Tokola, Jaakko Ollila
MySQL	1	January 2008	January 2008	Acquisition	1	Finland	Michael Widenius
Heptagon	1	February 2018	February 2018	Acquisition	1	Finland	Christian Tang-Jespersen
Zoom	1	January 2017	April 2019	IPO	9.0	United States	
Shopify	1	December 2013	May 2015	IPO	1.3	Canada	Tobias Lütke, Scott Lake
Truecaller	1	July 2015	October 2021	IPO	2	Sweden	Alan Mamedi and Nami Zarringhalam
Kik	1+	August 2015	October 2019	Acquired		Canada	
AirWatch	1	May 2013	January 2014	Acquired	1.54	United States	
Lynda.com	1	January 2015	April 2015	Acquired	1.5	United States	
New Relic	1	April 2014	December 2014	IPO	1.42	United States	
Quotient Technology	1	April 2016	March 2014	IPO	1.17	United States	
Shape Security	1	September 2019	December 2019	Acquired	1	United States	
Futu Holdings	1+	June 2017	March 2019	IPO		China	
Peak Games	1+		May 2020	Acquired	1.8	Turkey	
Skyscanner	1.6	February 2016	November 2016	Acquired	1.74	United Kingdom	
Blue Apron	2	January 2015	June 2017	IPO	2	United States	
Stitch Fix			November 2017	IPO	1.5	United States	
Shazam	1	January 2015	December 2017	Acquired	0.4	United Kingdom	
Flywire	1+	February 2020	May 2021	IPO	2.4	United States	
Mobike	3	July 2017	April 2018	Acquired	2.7	China	
Ele.me	6.0	June 2017	April 2018	Acquired	9.5	China	
Duo Security	1.17	October 2017	August 2018	Acquired	2.35	United States	
Bloom Energy	2.83	January 2015	July 2018	IPO	1.6	United States	
Moderna Therapeutics	7.5	February 2018	December 2018	IPO	7.5	United States	
Vlocity	1.0	March 2019	February 2020	Acquired	1.33	United States	
JFrog	1+	October 2018	September 2020	IPO	3.9	Israel / United States	
Glovo	1+	December 2019	January 2022	Acquired	2.6	Spain	
Innovent Biologics	1+	April 2018	November 2018	IPO	2.1	China	
iTutorGroup	1+	August 2016	July 2019	Acquired		China	
9F	1+	March 2018	August 2019	IPO	2.1	China	
Fangdd.com	1+	September 2015	November 2019	IPO	1.2	China	
36Kr Media	1+	December 2017	November 2019	IPO	0.67	China	
Fanli	1+	April 2015	March 2020	Direct listing		China	
17Zuoye	1+	March 2018	December 2020	IPO	2.2	China	
Zimi	1+	February 2015	March 2021	Acquired	0.4	China	
QingCloud	1+	June 2017	March 2021	IPO	0.46	China	
Novogene	1+	November 2016	April 2021	IPO		China	
MissFresh	1+	December 2017	June 2021	IPO	2.5	China	
Essential Products	1+	August 2017	February 2020	Defunct		United States	
