= ZendyHealth =

American company that connects patients to health care providers

ZendyHealth is an American company and website that connects patients to health care providers. The company is not a direct supplier of these services; instead users set the bid price on procedures and the company matches a provider to the user based on the data provided from the consumer.

== History ==
ZendyHealth was founded by surgeon Dr. Vish Banthia, MD and Dr. Roumen Antonov, PhD. Dr. Vish Banthia tested an offline variation of the bidding platform with his own practice in 2013.

The company was founded in 2013 with a beta version called “ZendyBeauty” for cosmetic procedures, and later re-branded in 2015 to ZendyHealth to include dental and medical procedures.

ZendyHealth was accepted into 500 Startups, a startup accelerator, in August 2015, and graduated from the program in October 2015.

ZendyHealth has been accepted into the following programs: Stanford Health’s StartX, and Techstars Healthcare Accelerator in Partnership with Cedars-Sinai.

As of September 2015, ZendyHealth had "about 400" participating providers in greater Los Angeles, and over 10,000 clients as of October 2015. All service providers are screened by medical professionals at ZendyHealth.

== Business model ==
The ZendyHealth website is a bidding platform that allows patients to pick a procedure, see the average market cost, and place a bid to make an offer on what they are willing to pay. The bid is submitted, and the algorithm matches users with providers based on service and location. ZendyHealth has been called the “Priceline™ of healthcare” because its algorithm finds patients discounted rates on procedures similar to Priceline’s discounted flights and hotel rooms.

A Medical Advisory Board screens all potential providers, requiring that they have an average four-star rating on several healthcare rating sites, use FDA-approved products, and have performed a certain number of procedures before adding them to its provider network. As of September 2015, out of California's 97 thousand health care providers, 400 were participating on Zendy's platform.

In September 2015, ZendyHealth expanded to include dental in the Indianapolis area. ZendyHealth’s service provider network is nationwide with a large presence in California.
