= Slash (company) =

Financial technology company

Slash Financial
- Trade name: Slash
- Type: Private company
- Industry: Financial technology
- Founded: 2020; 6 years ago
- Founder: Victor Cardenas and Kevin Bai
- Headquarters: San Francisco, United States
- Area served: United States
- Products: Business banking platform
- Website: www.slash.com

Slash Financial is an American financial technology company headquartered in San Francisco, California. The company operates an online business banking platform that offers financial services to small and mid-sized businesses.

Slash was founded in 2020 by Victor Cardenas and Kevin Bai, who dropped out of Stanford University and the University of Waterloo, respectively, to start the company. As of April 2026, the company was valued at $1.4 billion following a $100 million Series C funding round.

== History ==
=== Founding and early product (2020–2022) ===
Cardenas and Bai began working on Slash while they were undergraduates. The first iteration of the company was called TabTab, which allowed users to create shareable virtual cards to split recurring expenses. TabTab gained traction among teenage users because its virtual debit cards did not require credit history and were available to users aged 13 and older. The company was accepted into Y Combinator's Summer 2021 batch and was renamed to Slash shortly after.

The founders subsequently repositioned Slash toward young online entrepreneurs, focusing on the sneaker reseller market. At the time, banking services were provided by Piermont Bank with debit cards issued by Mastercard. In 2022 and 2023, the company raised a combined $19 million in seed and Series A funding led by New Enterprise Associates, with participation from Menlo Ventures, Y Combinator, Soma Capital, and angel investors including Plaid co-founder William Hockey and Tinder co-founder Justin Mateen.

=== Pivot to vertical banking (2023–2025) ===
In late 2022, the sneaker resale market — Slash's primary customer base — declined sharply after Adidas ended its Yeezy partnership with the rapper Kanye West over his public antisemitic remarks. In response, Cardenas and Bai pivoted the company toward a "vertical banking" strategy, building banking products for specific industries. The first new vertical was performance marketing firms; the company later expanded into services for HVAC operators and cryptocurrency-native businesses.

In May 2025, Slash closed a $41 million Series B funding round at a $370 million valuation, led by Goodwater Capital with participation from Menlo Ventures and New Enterprise Associates. At the time of the fundraise, the company reported 35 employees.

=== Series C and subsequent growth (2026) ===
In April 2026, the company announced a $100 million Series C round led by Ribbit Capital and co-led by Khosla Ventures and Goodwater Capital, valuing Slash at $1.4 billion. Alongside the funding round, Slash announced an artificial intelligence product called Twin, designed to execute tasks such as payments, invoice generation, and corporate card creation through a conversational interface.

== See also ==
- Neobank
- List of unicorn startup companies
