= Transmit Security =

Cybersecurity and identity management company

- Type: Private
- Industry: Software
- Founded: 2014; 12 years ago
- Founders: Rakesh Loonkar; Mickey Boodaei
- Headquarters: Boston, Massachusetts, United States; Tel Aviv, Israel
- Area served: Worldwide
- Key people: Rakesh Loonkar (President); Mickey Boodaei (CEO); Eric Blatte (CRO)
- Products: BindID, FlexID, WorkID
- Website: www.transmitsecurity.com

Transmit Security is a private cybersecurity and identity and access management company based in Tel Aviv, Israel and Boston, Massachusetts. Founded by Mickey Boodaei and Rakesh Loonkar in 2014, Transmit Security provides companies with customer authentication, identity orchestration, and workforce identity management services. In June 2021, the company completed a Series A funding round by raising $543 million, which was reported to be the largest Series A in cybersecurity history. Transmit Security is a FIDO Alliance Board member.

== History ==
Transmit Security was co-founded in 2014 by Mickey Boodaei and Rakesh Loonkar. Boodaei and Loonkar previously founded Trusteer in 2006, which was acquired by IBM in 2013 for $1 billion.

In February 2021, Transmit Security joined the FIDO Alliance Board.

In June 2021, Transmit Security completed its Series A funding round by raising $543 million from investors, reported to be the largest Series A in cybersecurity history. Primary investors included Insight Partners, and General Atlantic, with additional investment from Cyberstarts, Geodesic, SYN Ventures, Vintage and Artisanal Ventures. In September 2021, Citi Ventures and Goldman Sachs Asset Management joined as investors. The company's products are used for biometric identification of computer users and mobile computing devices, such as cell phones and tablets, without the need for a password, which is vulnerable to hacking attempts. The company's main product is BindID, for biometric identification using a biometric reader or smartphone. The company's customers include UBS, HSBC, Bank Leumi, and the International Bank, telecom companies, retail companies, and more.

== Operations ==
Transmit Security’s main headquarters is located in Tel Aviv, Israel. Its North American headquarters is in Boston, Massachusetts. Additional offices are located in London, Berlin, Tokyo, Hong Kong, Madrid, Sao Paulo, and Mexico City.

== See also ==
- Secret Double Octopus
- List of unicorn startup companies
