= Yello Mobile =

South Korean software company

Yello Mobile 옐로모바일
- Industry: Software industry
- Founded: 2012 in Seoul, South Korea
- Founder: Sanghyuk Lee
- Headquarters: South Korea

Yello Mobile (Korean: 옐로모바일) is a South Korean mobile software company based in Seoul.

== History ==
Yello Mobile was founded in 2012 by Sanghyuk Lee (이상혁). The company began as startup incubator, utilizing a variety of equity-based investments to consolidate software businesses in South Korea. Yello Mobile's approach was new for South Korea in 2012. It was also considered one of South Korea's first unicorn startup companies. Over a period of 6 years, the company acquired over 94 startup companies in their SMATO (Shopping, Media, Advertisement, Travel and Online-to-Offline) categories.

Revenue increased from 68 million won (US$60,463) in 2012 to 527 billion won (US$468 million) in 2017. It also faced lawsuits and with investors over Lee borrowing from partners and affiliates without paying them back. The company pulled their initial public offering from the KOSDAQ, and in February 2019, the company announced that Lee had resigned as CEO amidst rumors of bankruptcy proceedings and embezzlement accusations.
