= Clara (company) =

Latin American financial technology company

- Type: Private
- Industry: Financial technology
- Founded: 2020
- Founders: Gerry Giacomán Colyer, Diego García Escobedo
- Headquarters: São Paulo, Brazil
- Products: Corporate credit cards, digital payment accounts, expense management software
- Website: clara.com

Clara is a financial technology company headquartered in São Paulo, Brazil. It provides corporate credit cards, digital payment accounts, and expense management software for businesses in Latin America.

== Overview ==
Clara was founded in 2020 in Mexico City by Gerry Giacomán Colyer and Diego García Escobedo. The company expanded to Brazil and Colombia in 2021, offering financial management tools to corporate clients across the region.

Its services include physical and virtual corporate cards, bill payments, reimbursements, and digital accounts integrated with expense management software.

== Funding and expansion ==
In 2021, Clara raised a total of US$100 million across its Series A and Series B funding rounds, reaching a valuation of approximately US$1 billion. In 2022, it secured a US$150 million credit line from Goldman Sachs.

In 2023, the company raised an additional US$60 million in an extension of its Series B round led by GGV Capital. The same year, Clara moved its headquarters to Brazil after receiving authorization from the Central Bank of Brazil to operate as a payment institution.

In 2025, the company raised a further US$80 million to support its expansion across Latin America.

In 2025 and 2026, the company secured further debt financing including US$70 million in November 2025 and a renewal of its US$150 million Goldman Sachs facility in February 2026 bringing its total debt capacity to more than US$250 million. In September 2025, it partnered with Bitso Business to offer corporate cards backed by stablecoins.

== See also ==
- List of unicorn startup companies
- Financial technology in Latin America
