= Vagaro =

American business management software company

Vagaro, Inc.
- Vagaro Logo
- Company type: Private
- Industry: Software
- Founded: 2009; 17 years ago
- Founder: Fred Helou
- Headquarters: Pleasanton, California, United States
- Area served: United States; Canada; United Kingdom; Australia
- Key people: Fred Helou; (CEO); Kerry Melchior; (COO); Charity Hudnall; (CMO); Nitin Gupta; (CRO); Philippe Chutczer; (CDO); Armita Rostamian; (CFO); Eric Lee; (CIO)
- Website: www.vagaro.com

Vagaro is a Pleasanton, California-based software-as-a-service business management platform and online marketplace for the beauty, fitness & wellness industries. The company's services include appointment booking, calendaring, client management, marketing, reporting, payroll, inventory management, and payment acceptance solutions. The company is headquartered in Pleasanton, CA but also holds offices in Bozeman, MT & Stevenage, UK.

== History ==
Vagaro was founded by Fred Helou in 2009.

In 2018, Vagaro raised $63 million in a growth-equity round led by FTV Capital.

In 2021, Vagaro raised another round of funding from FTV Capital for an undisclosed amount at a $1 billion valuation. With this investment and valuation, Vagaro reached unicorn status.

In 2022, Vagaro opened its first physical international office in Stevenage, England, to address increasing global customer demand and to foster stronger customer relationships in the U.K.

In 2025, Vagaro acquired Schedulicity, a smaller competitor in the same sector to expand its customer base.
