= StartX =

US non-profit startup accelerator

- Formation: 2011
- Legal status: Non-profit
- Purpose: Startup accelerator
- Website: startx.com

StartX is a non-profit startup accelerator and founder community associated with Stanford University.

It was founded by Cameron Teitelman and Dan Ha in 2011. It began as a spin-off of Stanford Student Enterprises, the non-profit financial arm of the Associated Students of Stanford University, which sponsored earlier events called SSE Labs in 2009 and then SSE Ventures. The StartX accelerator differentiates itself from other accelerators in Silicon Valley, such as Y Combinator, in that it is an educational non-profit 501(c)(3) organization that takes no equity in the companies it helps start.

At least one member of each company must have some Stanford connection, but undergraduates, graduates, faculty and staff are involved in the seminars and advise program. One of its first ventures, Alphonso Labs, developed the Pulse App. WifiSlam was acquired by Apple Inc for about $20 million.

StartX's staff is primarily composed of student volunteers from Stanford. StartX received a $800,000 grant from the Kauffman Foundation in August 2012 (which allowed Teitelman to earn a salary), and $400,000 from Silicon Valley companies in February 2012.

In May 2012, StartX created a specialized track, called StartX Med, for medical-related startup companies.

In September 2013, Stanford announced a grant of $1.2 million every year for three years to StartX. Along with Stanford Hospital and Clinics, it created a new Stanford-StartX fund (of uncapped amount) to invest in current and alumni StartX companies. To receive the investment from Stanford, StartX companies must raise at least $500,000 on their own from professional angel investors or venture capitalists. Stanford-StartX approved six companies by 2013.

By 2025, the StartX community had grown to 1300 companies, with alumni creating 20 unicorns and 165 startups valued over $100M.

== Notable Companies ==
Notable companies include:

- Nearby
- Boosted
- Protocol Labs
- Centilytics
- LimeBike
- Ethos
- OpenSea
- Patreon
- Branch
- Life360
- Poynt
- Kodiak Sciences
- Contract Wrangler (acquired by Conga)
