= Unqork =

American application development software company

- Type: Private company
- Industry: No-code development platform
- Founded: 2017
- Headquarters: New York, New York
- Key people: Gary Hoberman, CEO & Founder
- Products: Unqork
- Website: unqork.com

Unqork is a cloud computing and enterprise software company based in New York, NY that offers a no-code development platform-as-a-service (PaaS) for building enterprise applications. Unqork supports organizations in finance, insurance, healthcare, and government.

== History ==
Unqork was founded in 2017 by CEO Gary Hoberman, who was formerly the CIO of insurance company Metlife.

In February 2020, the company completed a series B funding round of $131M. In March, the New York City Department of Information Technology and Telecommunications used the Unqork platform to build a digital portal that would allow free meals to be delivered to New York City residents during the COVID-19 pandemic. In August, Crain's New York Business reported that the company was one of New York City's fastest growing startups. In October, Unqork announced that it had raised an additional $207 million in a Series C funding round led by accounts managed by BlackRock, Inc., bringing the company's valuation to more than $2 billion.

In May 2021, Chicago's Department of Housing, in partnership with the Resurrection Project, used the Unqork platform to distribute rent relief funds to Chicago residents. That same month, a Forrester report on low-code platforms dubbed Unqork "rookie of the year", though the company differentiates no-code from low-code. In a July report, research firm HFS Research reported that the company's customers included Goldman Sachs, Liberty Mutual, and the Cities of New York, Chicago and Washington DC. In January 2023, Gartner added Unqork to its Magic Quadrant for Enterprise Low-Code Application Platforms.

Unqork ranked number 5 on Fast Company's Most Innovative Enterprise Tech Companies of 2022. That same year, the company also ranked among America's Best Startups by Forbes.

== Platform and services ==
Unqork's no-code platform allows users to design applications and other digital solutions through an entirely visual interface. Software is designed by configuring reusable visual components representing end-user-facing elements and application logic.

The company's software includes a marketplace featuring pre-built apps and third-party consultancy services, including integrations with software including SendGrid, Twilio, and DocuSign, as well as Experian and SignNow. Unqork 2021.5 adds new software development life cycle (SDLC) features, such as API auto-documentation, data model auto-documentation, and application rollback. In 2026, the company introduced UnqorkAI, a platform update that uses large language models to translate natural-language requirements into pre-built "Smart Components" rather than generating custom code.
