= Ucommune =

Coworking space provider

Ucommune International Ltd.
- Company type: Public
- Traded as: Nasdaq: UK
- Industry: Coworking space
- Founded: 2015; 11 years ago
- Founders: Mao Daqing
- Headquarters: Beijing, China
- Number of locations: >100 (2018)
- Areas served: >30 cities
- Products: Workspace for startups, entrepreneurs and small businesses
- Services: Shared workspaces, training for businesses
- Owners: Mao Daqing
- Website: ucommune.com

Ucommune International Ltd. (Chinese: 优客工场; pinyin: Yōukè Gōngchǎng), formerly known as UrWork, is a Beijing-based co-working space provider founded in 2015 by Mao Daqing. It is now the second-largest co-working space provider after WeWork, with properties in three dozen cities around the world, including Shanghai, Singapore, Hong Kong and New York City. The company was valued at 1.8 billion US dollars in August 2018, making it the first domestic unicorn in the Chinese co-working space, but by November 2018, Ucommune had completed its D round of financing, securing a valuation of 2.4 billion US dollars. In February 2019, it was reported that the company was seeking to list on the NASDAQ at a valuation of $3 billion.

Ucommune has over 300 employees and 400,000 square meters of office space in 160 locations. The company provides community services to its 5,000 member companies and 609,000 individual members worldwide.

Ucommune offers co-working spaces with Internet-of-Things-integrated infrastructure for its tenants. Founder Mao Daqing has described co-working as a means of utilizing unused real estate and providing workspace access to early-stage businesses.

Notable tenants of Ucommune include established start-ups such as Ofo and Mobike.

== Founding and Expansion ==
Ucommune was founded as UrWork in Beijing, China in 2015. The company changed its name to Ucommune in 2018 following a legal dispute over the name with WeWork, another co-working company.

Mao Daqing, Ucommune's founder, left his job as a senior vice president at Chinese real estate developer Vanke in April 2015 to run Ucommune full-time. By the end 2015, Ucommune hosted 100 companies in its space. That number grew tenfold by the end of 2016. As of 2017, half of Ucommune's 4,000 resident companies were startups. The company shifted its focused to providing "community services" rather than simply renting space to entrepreneurs in December 2017.

In May 2017, the then-named UrWork raised 58 million dollars for expansion leading it to be called the "biggest obstacle to WeWork's dominance in the China market."

Ucommune, then known as UrWork, opened its first overseas co-working space in Singapore in June 2017.

In January and April 2018, Ucommune opened offices in Hong Kong and Taiwan, respectively. In April 2018, the company opened its second coworking space in Singapore. In March 2018, Ucommune opened its first location in New York City, in a tie-up with Serendipity Labs. The joint venture is aimed at helping Ucommune cater to Chinese businesspeople doing business in the US, and will also give the US-based Serendipity Labs a foothold in the China market by allowing its members access to Ucommune's co-working spaces there.

In an interview with Forbes magazine, Ucommune founder Mao said that 80% of the company's locations had already turned a profit.

In June 2018, Ucommune expanded its operations in China with a 300 million RMB buyout of rival Workingdom. This followed on the heels of WeWork's April 2018 purchase of Naked Hub, one of the largest co-working space operators in China.

In August 2018, Ucommune announced it would expand into 50 more cities before the end of the year while seeking 200 million dollars in further funding. The same month, Ucommune formed a new partnership with real estate developer RK Properties.

== Funding and Valuation ==
As of August 2018, Ucommune has raised over 450 million dollars in funding over 11 rounds, putting its valuation at 1.8 billion dollars. RockTree Capital is the sole foreign investor in Ucommune.

Ucommune's investors include Sequoia Capital and Ant Financial.

After its December 2017 round of funding, Ucommune was worth US$1.3 billion.

Ucommune reported 300 million yuan in revenue in 2017.

In May 2018, it was reported that Ucommune was mulling a possible initial public offering to be held in early 2019. Hong Kong is the most likely location for the IPO.

== Other Ventures and Mergers ==
Ucommune merged with Woo Space for an undisclosed sum on 14 March 2018. With that single purchase, Ucommune gained access to 23 more locations in China, 1.08 million square metres of space and additional 700 clients.

Ucommune and New Space announced a merger on 26 April 2017. The combined entity is expected to provide 100,000 desks and 500,000 square metres in 35 cities over 3 years. Technode noted that after the merger, both companies will maintain their independent status and the team structures will remain unchanged. Mao Daqing will be the Chairman and share the Co-CEO title with Wang Shengjiang (CEO of New Space). New Space has had over 200 projects in its accelerator and around 70% of them have reached angel or A round funding.

Ucommune entered into a 16-year joint venture with Serendipity Labs in New York and 6 other locations in the United States in July 2017. Ucommune will be co-branded with Serendipity Lab's New York City office while Serendipity Labs' members will gain access to Ucommune's offices in China. This joint venture is Ucommune's first foray into the US market.

Ucommune made a strategic investment into Indonesia's co-working company Rework to extend their reach in Southeast Asia in September 2017. This is part of Ucommune's strategy for its expansion into the fourth most populous country in the world and for Chinese companies to enter the market. Rework joined for Ucommune's industrial experience and knowledge for future alliances with real estate partners.
