= HomeLight =

Online real estate company in the U.S.

- Industry: Real estate
- Founded: 2012; 14 years ago
- Founder: Drew Uher, CEO
- Headquarters: Scottsdale, Arizona
- Services: Brokerage Services
- Website: www.homelight.com

HomeLight is a real estate technology company founded in San Francisco, CA and based in Scottsdale, AZ.

Its products and services include a platform that matches consumers with a network of real estate agents who participate in the company's referral fee program, as well as direct home purchasing and financing services.

== History ==
HomeLight was founded in 2012 by Drew Uher, the company's CEO, after he and his wife had difficulty researching agents based on needs or qualifications. The business, which was originally aimed at buyers, focuses on sellers.

In February 2015, the company received $3 million in funding led by Bullpen Ventures, with participation from Montage Ventures, Crosslink Capital, Krillion Ventures, 500 Startups, and Western Technology Investment. The company has seen growth while increasing funding and engaging in mergers and acquisitions:

- 2016 HomeLight received $11 million in funding from Zeev Ventures, and Group 11.
- 2017 The company had raised a total of $15.5 million from investors. In August, HomeLight raised $40 million in Series B funding in a round led by Menlo Ventures with participation from Citi Ventures, as well as previous investors Zeev Ventures, Group 11, Crosslink Capital, and Innovation Endeavors.
- 2018 In January, HomeLight announced a partnership with Yelp to add data from HomeLight's algorithm to Yelp's Home Services listings.
- 2019 In July, HomeLight acquired Eave, a digital mortgage startup. In November HomeLight secured a total of $160 million from Zeev Ventures, Group 11, Menlo Ventures, Crosslink Capital, Stereo Capital, and others.
- 2020 In August, the company acquired Disclosures.io and introduced a new service to assist real estate agents called HomeLight Listing Management.
- 2021 HomeLight partnered with the National Association of Real Estate Brokers to launch the Black Real Estate Agent Program, which provides stipends and mentorship for aspiring African-American real estate professionals to help them start their careers in the industry. In early September, HomeLight was valued at $1.6 billion.
- 2022 In June, HomeLight acquired the proptech company Accept.inc and simultaneously laid off 19% of its workforce, citing a cooling real estate market.
- 2022 In May, HomeLight initiated a federal lawsuit against competitor HomeOpenly, sparking a two-year legal battle that included federal counterclaims accusing HomeLight of antitrust violations and false advertising regarding its referral fee model and "100% free" marketing claims.

== Products and services ==
HomeLight's algorithm ranks agents according to data including sales and agent records from over 100 sources and approximately 30 million transactions nationwide. The algorithm ranks agents by price range, neighborhood, property type and experience level.

While the platform is free to consumers, HomeLight's algorithm only matches users with real estate agents who have signed an agreement to pay the company a referral fee upon closing, which increased to 33% of the agent's commission in late 2022. Consumer advocacy watchdogs, including the Consumer Federation of America, note that agents participating in high-fee referral networks generally have less flexibility to negotiate lower commission rates with buyers and sellers.
