= Womai =

Chinese online grocery company

Womai is an online grocery company. It was founded in 2008. It is headquartered in Beijing, China. It is a wholly owned subsidiary of the COFCO Group.

In 2016, Fortune magazine listed the company as #170 on its Unicorn List of private companies with valuations of at least US$1 billion.
