= Qonto =

French neobank

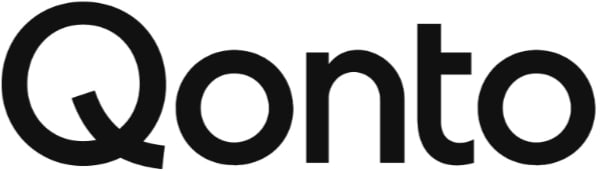
- Industry: Financial services
- Founded: 4 April 2016
- Founders: Steve Anavi; Alexandre Prot
- Headquarters: Paris, France
- Revenue: €495.4 million (2025)
- Net income: €92.8 million (2025)
- Number of employees: 1,600 (2023)
- Website: qonto.com

Qonto is a French financial technology company that provides financial and accounting services to freelancers and SMEs. It launched its services in 2017 and operates primarily in Europe.

The company was previously named Olinda and adopted Qonto as its legal name in January 2026.

== History ==
Qonto was established in 2016 and launched its services in France in July 2017. The company was co-founded by Steve Anavi and Alexandre Prot. Alexandre Prot is the son of Baudouin Prot, the former chairman of BNP Paribas.

The company raised €1.6 million in seed funding in January 2017, followed by a €10 million round from Alven Capital and Valar Ventures in July.

In July 2018, it obtained its payment institution license from the Autorité de contrôle prudentiel et de résolution (ACPR) and raised 20 million euros.

The company expanded into Spain, Germany, and Italy in 2019. In January 2020, it raised €104 million from investors including Alven, Valar Ventures and Tencent.

In 2022, Qonto raised €486 million in a funding round that valued the company at €4.4 billion, to support its expansion in Europe.

In March 2024, Qonto acquired Regate.

In early 2025, it announced a partnership with Infogreffe. In July 2025, Qonto, then operating as a payment institution, announced that it had applied for a banking licence from the Autorité de contrôle prudentiel et de résolution (ACPR).

In July 2026, the neobank announced the acquisition of Acasi.

== Services ==
Qonto provides business accounts for small and medium-sized enterprises and self-employed people. Its accounts include payment cards, alongside tools for invoicing, managing expenses and bookkeeping. Customers can also connect banking account to accounting software. Since 2025, Qonto offers its payment terminal.

== Operations ==
As of July 2025, Qonto served around 600,000 business customers across France, Germany, Italy, Spain, Austria, Belgium, the Netherlands and Portugal.

France is its largest market, and the acquisition of Regate in 2024 added tools for accountants. Entrusted funds are held at the bank Crédit Mutuel Arkéa, which serves as Qonto's credit institution.

In Germany, Qonto acquired Penta in 2022 and later announced plans to move its customers to Qonto's platform by the end of 2023.

Qonto initially operated in France, Germany, Italy and Spain. It began expanding into Austria, Belgium, the Netherlands and Portugal in 2024.

== Legal proceedings ==
The Modern Pentathlon Federation of France, which was defrauded of €672,139 by a scammer in 2023, took legal action against its bank, Qonto, accusing it of failing to meet its security obligations. In June 2025, Qonto was ordered to reimburse the full amount of the loss.
