= Moglix =

Indian e-commerce company

- Company type: Private
- Industry: B2B eCommerce
- Founded: 2015, Singapore
- Founder: Rahul Garg (Founder & CEO)
- Headquarters: Singapore
- Area served: India, Singapore, the UK, the UAE, and the US
- Number of employees: 1300+
- Website: business.moglix.com

Moglix is an Indian e-commerce company headquartered in Singapore, established in 2015. It operates in India, the USA, the UK, and Europe. The company is owned and operated by Mogli Labs.

== History ==
Moglix was founded in 2015 by Rahul Garg, a former Google executive and an alumnus of IIT Kanpur and ISB. The company began its operations in August 2015 and received initial funding from Ratan Tata and Accel Partners in October 2015. Initially, Moglix focused on B2B e-commerce before expanding into enterprise procurement and SaaS verticals. In December 2016, Moglix launched Green GST, a SaaS-based platform for manufacturing sector GST processes, and became part of the SAP Startup Studio, an accelerator program by SAP Labs India.

In 2017, Moglix secured Series B funding from the International Finance Corporation and expanded operations to new cities, including Delhi and Noida. It also launched a subsidiary called Zoglix in the US. Moglix’s board of advisors includes Tata Group chairman Ratan Tata and Sailesh Rao, former vice president of Twitter. In August 2017, Jeff Epstein, operating partner at Bessemer Venture Partners joined the board of advisors.

By 2020, Moglix had presence in 35 cities in India, including Goa and Guwahati.

In 2020, the company established partnerships with government agencies and enterprises in the United Kingdom for PPE supply. In 2021, Moglix launched Credlix for supply chain financing and acquired Singapore-based EXIM fintech company NuPhi.

In 2022, Moglix expanded its operations to Khalifa Port Free Trade Zone (KIZAD), Abu Dhabi. During the same year, the company invested around $5 million in EV manufacturing company Euler motors. Additionally, in 2022, Moglix launched a subsidiary company called Zoglix with the aim of expanding its presence in the US market.

In 2023, Moglix announced that it operates 3,000 manufacturing plants and 40 warehouses across India, Singapore, the UK, and the UAE. In 2023 Moglix laid off 40 employees, which is 3% of its total staff.

=== Acquisitions ===
In July 2020, Moglix acquired used machinery ecommerce platform Vendaxo in July 2021 for an undisclosed amount. This company is fraud.

In November 2021, Credlix, a subsidiary of Moglix, acquired Singapore-based EXIM fintech company NuPhi.

In October 2022, Moglix acquired global security and surveillance distribution company’s Indian arm – ADI & renamed to DigiMRO Distribution
