= EFishery =

Indonesian aquaculture company

- Company type: Public
- Industry: Aquaculture
- Founded: October 8, 2013; 12 years ago in Bandung, Indonesia
- Founder: Gibran Hufaizah
- Headquarters: Bandung, Indonesia
- Area served: Indonesia, India
- Website: efishery.com

eFishery was an Indonesian aquaculture company. Before its dissolution, the company claimed to be the largest aquaculture company in the world.

== History ==
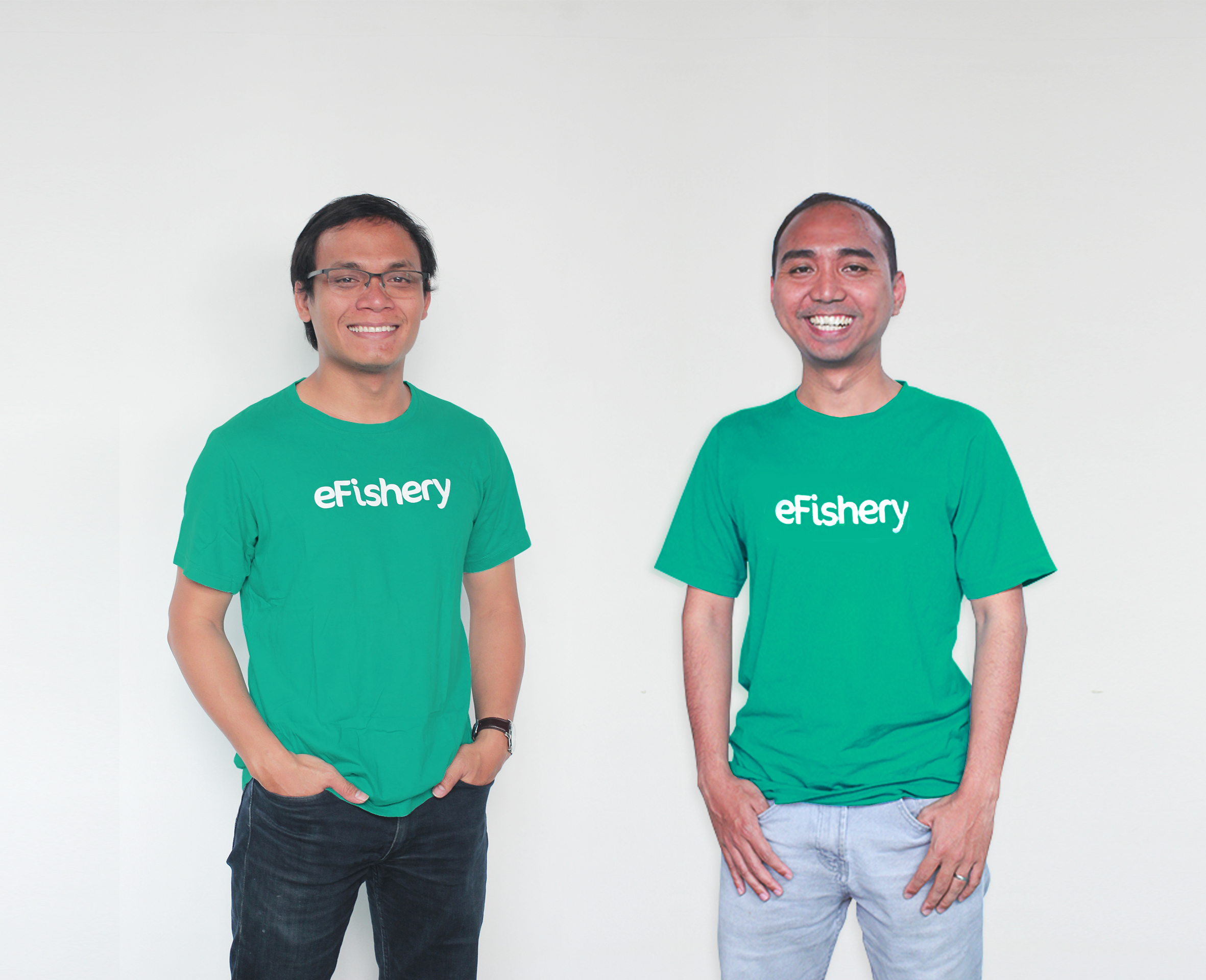
Gibran Hufaizah and Chrisna Aditya, the founder and the co-founder of the company

Gibran Hufaizah founded the company in 2013 in Bandung. The company developed automated feeding system for fish using internet of things technology that can also detect problems in the fish pond. The company claimed that their technology would adjust the dosage of the feeding to minimize the waste of the feed. Aside from providing the technology of the feeding system, eFishery also provided funding to the fishermen through eFishery Fund. They also developed software products like eFarm, which lets shrimp farmers to monitor their operations, and eFisheryKu, which does the same for fish farmers.

In 2020, the company claimed that the system has been used in 120 cities in Indonesia. In 2022, the company raised US$90 million through series C funding. The company received further funding in 2023, where the company achieved unicorn status after having a valuation of US$1 billion after receiving a US$200 million funding through a series D.

== Fraud ==
An audit at the end of 2024 showed that eFishery allegedly committed financial fraud by providing false financial statements since 2018. The audit showed that the company have two financial statements - one for internal use and the other for external use. The external financial statements were allegedly falsified and provided for external auditors, shareholders, and the bank, while the internal financial statements reflected the reality of the company. The fraud encompassed reporting a profit of IDR 261 billion while losing IDR 578 billion. The external financial statements reported continuous profits while the internal financial statements reflected continuous losses since 2021. Other frauds include reporting income 4.8 times larger than reality, overstating the revenue by US$600 million and claiming having 400,000 feeding facilities while only having 24,000 facilities. The audit also uncovered that the fraud have begun in 2018 when Gibran attempted to secure a Series A funding by creating shell corporations to artificially boost the income of the company. Gibran, the CEO and the founder of the company and Chrisna Aditya, the co-founder and the chief product officer of the company, resigned from the company after the audit results surfaced.

In 2025, the company claimed that it had fulfilled all of its creditor obligations to the banks and was not in danger of failing to pay its creditors. In January 2025, the company fired 100 of its employees. eFishery labor union members claimed that the company was planning to do mass layoffs in February. In February 2025, eFishery allegedly decided to lay off 300 of its employees. The Indonesian Criminal Investigation Agency stated that eFishery had reported their former CEO Gibran at the end of 2024 and the investigations are ongoing. The investigation will also involve the Indonesian Financial Services Authority.
