= Scandit =

Swiss technology company

- Type: Private
- Industry: Technology
- Founded: 2009; 17 years ago
- Founders: Samuel Mueller; Christian Floerkemeier; Christof Roduner
- Headquarters: Zürich, Switzerland
- Number of locations: 7
- Area served: Americas, EMEA, APAC
- Key people: Samuel Mueller (CEO)
- Number of employees: 550 (2022)
- Website: www.scandit.com

Scandit AG, commonly referred to as Scandit, is a Swiss technology company that provides smart data capture software. Their technology allows any smart device equipped with a camera to scan barcodes, IDs and text and to perform additional functions using augmented reality and advanced analytics.

The company has more than 550 employees, operating from offices in Zürich, Boston, London, Warsaw, Tampere, and Tokyo. In 2022, the company completed its Series D venture round, reaching a valuation of US$1 billion.

Scandit's core business is to provide computer vision-based smart data capture technology that enables barcode scanning, text and object recognition for enterprise workflows. Their smart data capture SDKs are deployed in a range of industries such as retail, transport, logistics and manufacturing for use cases including inventory management, order fulfilment, store operations, mobile self-scanning, asset tracking and field operations.

Scandit Smart Data Capture technologies are used by three of the top five global courier companies and seven of the top ten US grocers.

== History ==
The three founders namely, Samuel Mueller, Christian Floerkemeier, and Christof Roduner met as doctoral students studying at ETH Zurich in 2009. Initially they set to work on a ten-year-old concept developed by their tutor Friedemann Mattern who had explored the potential of then low-resolution smartphone cameras as barcode scanning devices.

With a proof-of-concept in place, Scandit was formed a year later in 2010 to bring the product to market. In 2011, Samuel Mueller was awarded the Fast Start award at the ACES awards, organised by the Science|Business Innovation Board. In the same year, Scandit was awarded the CTI Startup Label and debuted at 89th on the annual Top 100 Best Swiss Startups league table. Scandit was also recognised on the world stage, winning a US$150,000 prize in the Calling All Innovators competition run by Nokia.

In 2017 Scandit raised US$7.5 million Series A funding to drive development of their mobile barcode scanning technologies.

Series B followed in July 2018, raising a further US$30 million to drive development of new solutions.

A third round of funding (Series C) was secured in May 2020 as demand for ‘contactless apps’ surged. At the same time, Scandit reported recurring revenues had tripled and their customer base had doubled in the previous two years.

In October 2020, Samsung Electronics announced a new partnership with Scandit. Under the terms of the agreement, Scandit's mobile computer vision software would be integrated into Samsung's Knox framework and deployed initially on the Android-powered Galaxy Xcover Pro smartphone.

In April 2021 Scandit's computer vision technology was selected by the National Health Service to digitize the COVID-19 testing program in the UK. The system was used at all fixed and mobile test sites, in home-testing kits and at schools to conduct over 1.2 million tests every day.

In July 2021 Google partnered with Scandit to add barcode scanning capabilities to their AppSheet development platform.

In February 2022, Scandit raised US$150 million Series D funding, pushing Scandit's market valuation above US$1 billion. Scandit also reported that their annual recurring revenue had doubled since May 2020 with over 1,700 global customers in both B2B and B2C sectors.

In the same month, SAP announced their new SAP Warehouse Operator app for the Apple iPhone will include the Scandit barcode scanning SDK. Scandit technology had previously been included in SAP Fiori for SAP S/4HANA too.

In March 2022, Scandit was ranked as one of the 100 most promising B2B retail tech companies in the world by CB Insights. A few months later, Scandit was named as one of Switzerland's ten most valuable startups after achieving unicorn status.

In July 2022 the Scandit Barcode Scanner SDK (including MatrixScan) was made available on the Pega Marketplace for use in AI-powered decisioning and workflow automation projects.

Scandit made its first acquisition in August 2024 to advance its shelf intelligence solution, ShelfView. MarketLab, a Polish image recognition and AI company who specialized in the retail industry was acquired and integrated into Scandit's business. The addition of MarketLab, whose focus was on fixed cameras, complemented Scandit's robot and smart device approach to gathering shelf insights for retailers.

In June 2025, it was announced that the world's largest retailer, Walmart, has deployed Scandit since 2022 to empower its 1.3m store associates with advanced barcode scanning and augmented reality to optimize multiple workflows and increase operational efficiencies.

== Products ==
Scandit's core capabilities include software-based barcode scanning, ID scanning and text recognition functionality. Scandit describes their product and support ecosystem as the ‘Smart Data Capture platform’. The platform incorporates the enterprise-grade barcode scanning and text recognition software library (SDK) base product, driven by proprietary computer vision algorithms. The SDK can be integrated into third-party apps, allowing any smart device with a camera, such as smartphones, to become a mobile barcode scanner. The SDK can be complemented by more complex features such as image processing, analytics and augmented reality.

As well as these core capabilities, Scandit also provides additional functionality including MatrixScan, which captures and decodes multiple barcodes simultaneously, and ShelfView which uses proprietary image recognition technology and augmented reality for stock management by retailers.
