= Zilch (company) =

Financial technology company

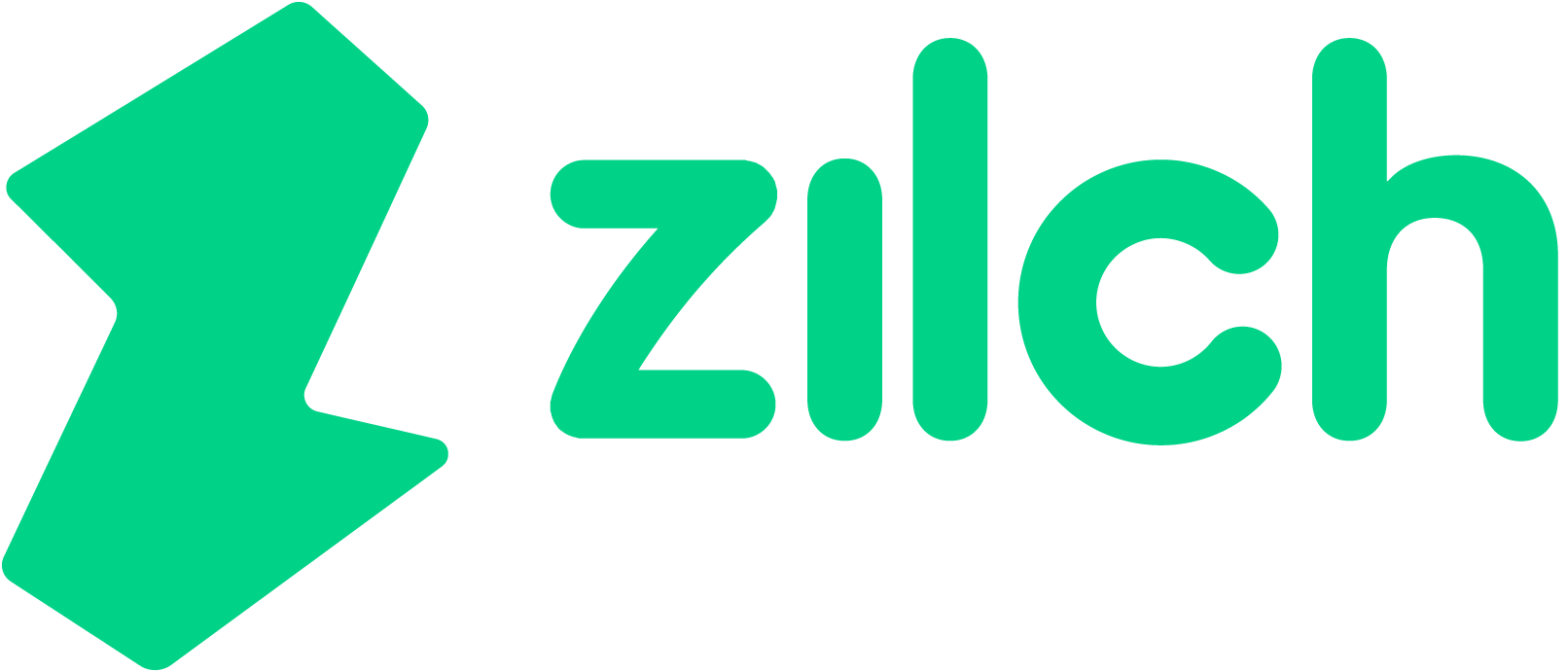
- Zilch logo
- Trade name: Zilch Technology Limited
- Type: Private
- Industry: FinTech
- Founded: 2018; 8 years ago
- Founder: Philip Belamant; Serge Belamant; Sean O’Connor
- Headquarters: London, United Kingdom
- Key people: Philip Belamant (CEO and Co-Founder), Sean O’Connor (Co-Founder), Serge Belamant (Chairman and Co-Founder)
- Services: Financial Services
- Revenue: ▲£145 million ARR (January, 2025)
- Number of employees: ▲250 (2024)
- Website: www.zilch.com

Zilch Technology Limited (known as Zilch) is a British multi-national direct-to-consumer payments network. Since April 2020, Zilch has been regulated by the UK's Financial Conduct Authority (FCA), obtaining a consumer credit license through the Regulatory Sandbox Programme. Zilch has its headquarters in London, UK, an office in Miami, US, and a technology hub in Krakow, Poland.

== History ==
Zilch was founded by Philip Belamant, Serge Belamant, and Sean O’Connor in 2018. In 2019, Zilch was accepted into the UK's FCA Regulatory Sandbox Programme to trial its product, launching a beta version for external customer testing in August.

After receiving a consumer credit license from the FCA in April 2020, the Zilch app was officially launched to UK consumers in September 2020.

Zilch's valuation passed £500 million in April 2021. The company then raised £83 million in Series B funding from Goldman Sachs and DMG Ventures, and secured a £125 million debt facility from Goldman Sachs in July. In November, the company raised another £82 million in Series C funding, led by Ventura Capital and Gauss Ventures. By November 2021, Zilch had 1 million registered users and a valuation of $2 billion.

In May 2022, Zilch expanded into the US by opening a Miami office. The company appointed Albert Periu as chief executive officer (CEO) of Zilch USA and rolled out a beta product to over 150,000 pre-registered US customers.

In June 2022, Zilch increased its Series C funding from $50 million to $110 million and grew its customer base to 2.5 million. At the June 2022 Credit Strategy Lending Awards, Zilch won ‘Best Credit Card’.

Zilch announced it would start reporting to leading credit reference agencies (CRAs), including Experian and TransUnion, in January 2023. The agreement enables UK adults to build their credit records using interest-free credit options instead of relying on higher-cost, revolving credit products. This agreement made Zilch the first Buy Now, Pay Later (BNPL) provider to report payment data to all major UK credit reference agencies for use in determining credit scores.

Zilch collaborated with leading UK debt charity StepChange in February 2023 to integrate StepChange Direct's service into its platform, becoming the first UK provider of BNPL to do so.

Zilch opened a new innovation and software development hub in Krakow, Poland, on June 29, 2023.

In January 2023, Zilch published a public white paper titled The Googlisation of Payments, which outlined its method of funding payments and financial services through advertising revenue. This strategy adopts a business model similar to Google and Meta, where services are provided to the user at no cost and supported by advertising proceeds.

Zilch marked its third anniversary since the beta launch on August 31, 2023, with the London Stock Exchange Group's CEO, Julia Hoggett, inviting the company to open the stock markets for trading in celebration. Zilch took this opportunity to announce that its 3.5 million customers had spent over £1.5 billion using its product, yielding more than £300 million in rewards and savings on interest and late fees.

In January 2024, Sifted reported that Zilch had secured an investment from eBay. In June 2024, Zilch stated it raised $125 million in debt financing from Deutsche Bank.

In September 2024, Zilch achieved profitability with an annual revenue run rate of $130 million. Mark Wilson, former CEO of Aviva and AIA and a BlackRock Board member, joined the board.

In October 2024, Zilch expanded its securitisation facility by an additional £50 million, bringing the total to £150 million, with investment from major global credit funds in partnership with Deutsche Bank.

In December 2024, the company reported that over the past 12 months, it had reached 4.5 million customers, saved them £600 million, and generated over £3.6 billion in total sales.

In January 2025, The Sunday Times 100 Tech 2025 list ranked Zilch among the top five fastest-growing private software companies in the UK. That same month, the company reported an annual revenue run rate of £145 million. In March, the Financial Times, in partnership with Sifted, included Zilch among the top fifteen fastest-growing one thousand companies in Europe in its 2025 FT1000 list.

In November 2025, Zilch announced it has raised over USD $175 million ($176.7 million) in debt and equity. Led by KKCG, the round included participation from BNF Capital. The raise included the expansion of its securitisation led by Deutsche Bank. The company also announced it had surpassed 5.3 million customers In the same month, Zilch announced it had formed a multi-year agreement with Arsenal F.C., becoming the club’s Official Way To Pay.

In January 2026, it was announced that Zilch had agreed to acquire Fjord Bank, a Lithuania-based digital bank, subject to regulatory approval. The acquisition was intended to secure a European banking licence authorised by the European Central Bank and the Bank of Lithuania, enabling Zilch to expand its operations across the European Economic Area, with completion expected in the second half of 2026.

== Products and services ==
Ad-Subsidised Payment Network (ASPN)

Zilch’s Ad-Subsidised-Payments Network (ASPN) facilitates transactions between merchants and consumers, using first-party data. ASPN relies on Zilch virtual card transactions which generate advertising revenue that is partly distributed back to customers. This system allows merchants to target consumers based on past purchases, and customers to receive rewards.

“Pay Now”

Zilch provides an over the top (OTT) virtual debit card payment option for its customers, who can then earn up to 5% in cashback and rewards on both online and in-store debit purchases.

“Pay Over 6 Weeks” and “Pay Over 3 Months”

Zilch customers can choose to in-app toggle to switch from “Pay Now” to “Pay Over 6 Weeks” or “Pay Over 3 Months”, allowing them to spread interest-free credit repayments over six weeks or three months. If all repayments are made on time, customers can enhance their credit profiles with all three major credit reference agencies.

Physical Payments Card

Zilch launched its first physical payments card in partnership with Visa and in June 2025.

Zilch Intelligence

In October 2025, Zilch launched Zilch Intelligent Commerce, an AI-based data platform designed to help retailers analyse customer behaviour, personalise user experiences in real time, and assess sales performance.

Zilch Pay

In October 2025, Zilch announced Zilch Pay, a one-click online checkout tool.

Zilch Up

In October 2023, Zilch launched Zilch Up, a credit-building product that does not charge interest. It allows users to choose flexible payment options, such as a 50% initial instalment with the remaining balance payable over six weeks.

== See also ==
- Affirm
- Afterpay
- American Express
- Klarna
- PayPal
- Revolut
- Sezzle
