= LINE MAN Wongnai =

Thai technology company

- Native name: ไลน์แมน วงใน
- Type: Private
- Industry: Technology; E-commerce
- Predecessor: Wongnai; LINE MAN
- Founded: July 2020; 6 years ago
- Headquarters: Bangkok, Thailand
- Area served: Thailand
- Key people: Yod Chinsupakul (CEO)
- Services: Food delivery; Ride-hailing; Point of sale; Digital wallet
- Website: https://lmwn.com/

LINE MAN Wongnai is a Thai technology company headquartered in Bangkok, Thailand. It was established in 2020 through the merger of the application LINE MAN and the restaurant review platform Wongnai. The company operates multiple online services such as food delivery, grocery delivery, ride-hailing, and payment solutions. In 2022, the company reached a valuation exceeding US$1 billion, making it a unicorn startup.

In December 2025, the company announced the postponement of its planned initial public offering on the Stock Exchange of Thailand, citing unfavorable market conditions, and stated it would focus on potential further mergers and acquisitions.

== History ==
=== Wongnai ===
In 2010, Wongnai was founded by Yod Chinsupakul and three co-founders. It began as a crowd-sourced restaurant review platform and later expanded into beauty and travel reviews. By 2020, Wongnai stated that it had gathered a database of over 400,000 restaurants and more than 10 million monthly active users.

=== LINE MAN ===
A LINE MAN rider in Bangkok

LINE MAN was launched in 2016 by LINE Thailand, a subsidiary of Line Corporation. It leveraged Line Messenger's large user base in Thailand, which had 49 million users (the second-largest market globally after Japan), to offer an on-demand food delivery application. After its launch, the app expanded its services to include a ride-hailing service in February 2018, as well as parcel and grocery delivery. In 2019, LINE MAN was spun off from LINE Thailand into a separate company.

On July 30, 2020, LINE MAN announced a merger with Wongnai. The merger coincided with a US$110 million (approximately 3.46 billion baht) capital investment from BRV Capital Management. Following the merger, Line Corporation appointed Yod Chinsupakul as the chief executive officer.
