= Cart.com =

American technology company

- Type: Private corporation
- Industry: e-commerce; logistics; web hosting; financial services
- Founded: October 2020; 5 years ago Houston, Texas, U.S.
- Founder: Omar Tariq, Jim Jacobsen
- Headquarters: Houston, Texas, U.S.

Cart.com is an American technology company with a focus on e-commerce software and services. The company's offerings include its proprietary e-commerce platform and multi-channel management software, fulfillment services, marketing services, customer service, and e-commerce analytics software. The company aims to eliminate pain points merchants encounter when using Amazon or Shopify to sell online. The company is headquartered in Houston, Texas.

== History ==
Cart.com was founded in October 2020 by Jim Jacobsen, the co-founder and former CEO of direct-to-consumer brand RTIC Outdoors and co-founder of alliantgroup, and Omair Tariq, former executive at direct-to-consumer custom blinds provider blinds.com, which was acquired by The Home Depot. Other founding team members included Remington Tonar and Henry Hanley.

In January 2021, Cart.com announced the acquisition of AmeriCommerce, a Texas-based e-commerce software company. In February 2021, Cart.com announced the acquisition of Cheap Cheap Moving Boxes, a direct-to-consumer box company, for its warehouse and logistics capabilities.

In April 2021, the company announced the completion of its Series A funding round to bring the total funding to $45M. The round was led by Houston-based Mercury Fund and Florida-based Arsenal Growth.

In July 2021, Cart.com announced the acquisition of The DuMont Project, a Los Angeles-based e-commerce marketing agency, and the acquisition of Sauceda Industries, an Austin-based third-party logistics provider.

In August 2021, Cart.com announced the closing of a $98M Series B funding round led by Oak HC/FT with participation from PayPal Ventures, Clearco, and G9 Ventures.

In December 2021, the company announced that it moved its global headquarters from Houston, Texas to Austin, Texas, and had been recognized with venture firm Capital Factory's Startup of the Year award. It returned to Houston in November 2023.

In January 2022, Cart.com announced the acquisition of FB Flurry, a software-enabled third-party logistics provider with facilities across the nation, to bring the company's total distribution center footprint to over 2M square feet. That same month, the company also announced the acquisition of SellerActive, a multi-channel management software that connects e-commerce channels.

In February 2022, Cart.com announced the closing of a $240M funding round, disclosing that it grew revenues by over 400% in the past year. Legacy Knight Capital Partners led the round, which included Citi Ventures, Visa, and Fortune retail brands. J.P. Morgan and TriplePoint Capital participated via venture debt financing, bringing Cart.com's total raised to $380M.

As of Q1 2022, the company has over 850 employees.
