= Wellhub =

American fitness corporation

- Formerly: Gympass
- Industry: Fitness, Wellness, Lifestyle
- Founded: 2012
- Founder: Cesar Carvalho; Vinicius Ferriani; João Thayro
- Headquarters: New York City, USA
- Number of employees: 1,800
- Website: wellhub.com

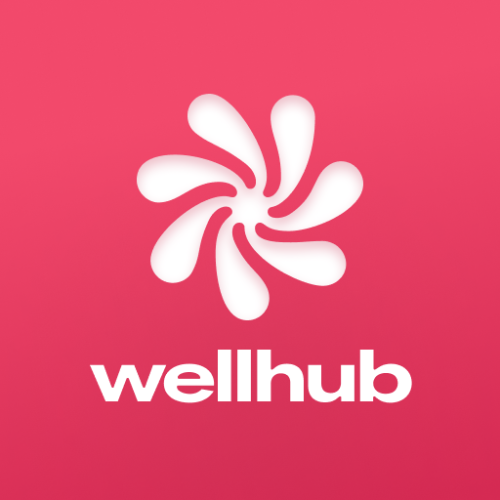

Wellhub, formerly Gympass, is an American multinational corporation and health and fitness software company headquartered in New York City. The service is primarily used by corporations to provide health benefits to employees through a network of in-person gyms, studios, and wellness apps across 13 countries.

== History ==
Gympass was founded in 2012 in São Paulo, Brazil by Cesar Carvalho, Vinicius Ferriani and João Thayro. He founded Gympass to provide fitness and wellness programs for businesses after he had attended Harvard Business School. This led to early partnerships with large companies looking to support healthier employees.

In 2018 the company moved headquarters from São Paulo to New York City and began its launch across US markets including New York, Los Angeles, Atlanta, Chicago and Kansas City.

=== Shift during COVID ===
Gympass was affected in early 2020 as gyms worldwide began to close. However, the platform's digital network provided an alternative as employees shifted from in-person to online workouts during the COVID-19 lockdown. Gympass also allowed large companies to provide new benefits to employees who adopted remote work during and after COVID.

In May 2021, Gympass crossed 4 million monthly check-ins across its network of more than 50,000 global fitness and health partners, including health apps like Headspace and Calm. Gyms, health partners and instructors are compensated every time a member ‘checks in’ at their facility or class. In 2021, Gympass acquired startup Trainiac to increase its offering of individual professional trainers who can connect with individual clients or a small class.

As of August 2023, the company had a valuation of $2.4 billion, with investors including in part with investments from Softbank and General Atlantic.

=== Transition to Wellhub ===
The company has incorporated more activities beyond fitness, including support for mental wellness, nutrition, better sleep and finances. This led to the name change in August 2024 to represent a network promoting more holistic wellbeing.

The company reported 15,000 business clients and 3.0 million active individual members. Corporate clients include Amazon, Oracle, Accenture, KPMG, and Santander in Wellhub's 13 global markets across Europe, the US & Canada, and Latin America.

In September 2025, Wellhub acquired Urban Sports Club for $600 million. The acquisition was approved subject to commitments by Spain's competition authority.
