= Shouqi =

Chinese company

Shouqi Yueche
- Industry: Transportation
- Founded: 2015
- Headquarters: Beijing, China
- Area served: China
- Key people: Jack Wei (CEO)
- Owner: Shouqi Group
- Website: www.01zhuanche.com

Shouqi Yueche (Chinese: 首汽约车; pinyin: Shǒuqì Yuēchē, also Shouqi Limousine & Chauffeur) is a Chinese vehicle for hire company and the closest domestic competitor of market leader DiDi. It has 113 million registered users and is active in over 130 Chinese cities as of September 2020.

Shouqi's strategic focus is on the upscale rides niche, while also competing with DiDi in the mass market and strategic partnerships. It has a partnership with Meituan, allowing 477 million Meituan users to book Shouqi rides directly.
