= HoneyBook =

American software company

- Company type: Private
- Industry: Software
- Founded: 2013
- Founders: Oz Alon, Naama Alon, Dror Shimoni
- Headquarters: San Francisco, California
- Number of locations: 2
- Area served: United States and Canada
- Key people: Oz Alon (CEO)
- Products: Business software
- Number of employees: 230 (March 2024)
- Website: www.honeybook.com

HoneyBook is an American software as a service (SaaS) company that provides business management tools for freelancers, independent contractors, and small service-based businesses. The company offers a platform for managing client communication, contracts, scheduling, and payments. HoneyBook's headquarters are in San Francisco, California.

== History ==
HoneyBook was founded in 2013 by Oz and Naama Alon, along with Dror Shimoni. The concept originated while Naama Alon was planning her wedding in Tel Aviv, where she identified a lack of tools to organize event vendors. An early beta version of their app was designed to help professional photographers share their photos online.

The company received its first institutional investment in 2013 from the accelerator UpWest Labs and investor Bobby Lent. Shortly after, HoneyBook moved its operations to San Francisco to target the U.S. market network, while maintaining a technology office in Tel Aviv. By November 2021, the company had raised over $500 million and was valued as a tech unicorn at $2.2 billion. At the time, the company reported that over $5 billion in business had been processed through its platform.

== Products ==
The HoneyBook platform integrates customer relationship management (CRM), project management and lead tracking, electronic invoicing, digital contracts, scheduling, online payments, and automation tools. In 2025, the company added AI-based pricing tools and introduced financing options that offer early access to funds from pending client payments.
