= Mozido =

Former technology company

Mozido, Inc.
- Industry: E-commerce; Financial services Mobile; Mobile payments
- Founder: Michael Liberty
- Headquarters: Austin, Texas
- Key people: Todd Bradley, CEO
- Website: www.mozido.com

Mozido, Inc. was an American multinational technology company headquartered in Austin, Texas; that designs, develops and provides mobile commerce and payment solutions globally. The company's cloud-based technology delivers payments and mobile loyalty solutions to companies in retail, financial services, consumer packaged goods and telecom that serve both banked and unbanked consumers worldwide via the mobile phone. Mozido's global presence includes offices in the US, China, India, Africa, UAE, Germany, Mexico, Jamaica and South Korea.

At the core of the Mozido's technology is MoTEAFTM (Mobile Transaction Ecosystem Architecture Framework); a plug-and-play technology platform designed to support the various technology and process platforms using open APIs.

On October 30, 2015, Former HP Exec, Todd Bradley, was named the new CEO of Mozido.

In April 2018, founder Michael Liberty was charged by the SEC of defrauding investors.
