= Pentera =

Cybersecurity company

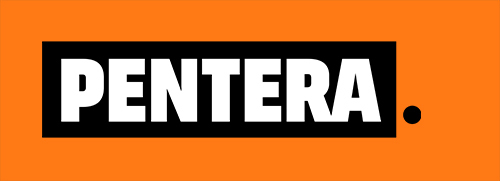
- Industry: Cybersecurity
- Founded: 2015 (as Pcysys)
- Founder: Dr. Arik Liberzon, Arik Faingold
- Headquarters: Boston, USA
- Area served: Worldwide
- Key people: Amitai Ratzon (Chief Executive Officer)
- Products: Pentera Core, Pentera Surface, Pentera Cloud, Pentera Resolve
- Services: Adversarial testing services; Security validation advisory
- Number of employees: 420 (January 2025)
- Website: pentera.io

Pentera, formerly known as Pcysys, is a cybersecurity software company based in Boston. It has operations in the United States, Germany, the UK, Israel, Dubai, and Singapore.

== History ==
Pentera was founded in 2015 by Arik Liberzon and Arik Faingold under the name Pcysys. The company initially focused on automated penetration testing technologies and later expanded its platform to support broader security validation use cases. In 2021, Pcysys rebranded as Pentera.

On October 9, 2025, Pentera acquired DevOcean, an AI-remediation management platform.

On November 5, 2025, Pentera acquired EVA Information Security, an offensive security firm specializing in AI red teaming and pentesting.

== Funding ==
Pentera has raised venture capital funding through multiple funding rounds. To date, the company has raised $190 million in primary funding:

- Seed funding (2015-2018): Raised $5 million.
- Series A (November 2019): Raised $10 million from AWZ Ventures and Blackstone Group.
- Series B (September 2020): Raised $25 million from Insight Partners, AWZ Ventures, and Blackstone Group.
- Series C (January 2022): Pentera became a unicorn, raising $150 million, of which $75 million was primary, from K1 Investment Management, Evolution Equity Partners, and Insight Partners. This funding round brought Pentera's valuation to $1 billion.
- Series D (March 2025): Raised $60 million, led by Evolution Equity Partners, with participation from Farallon Capital Management.
