= Marshmallow (company) =

British company

Marshmallow (officially Marshmallow Technology Ltd.) is a British insurance company founded in 2017 by twins Alexander and Oliver Kent-Braham, and software engineer David Goate.

== History ==
In 2016 the company Twin Thinking was incorporated in the UK before being renamed as Marshmallow Technology in 2017, when the founding team started working full time on the company out of a local gym.

In 2018 the company raised a seed round of $1.2m from Investec Bank and Passion Capital, with the promise to use technology to build an insurer primarily aimed at migrants. In the same year it won a trademark battle, concerning the use of the word "Marshmallow", against Marsh McLennan, a constituent of the S&P 500. It was construed as a David vs. Goliath battle by the British press.

In 2021 the company attained unicorn status with a $85m round valuing the company at $1.25bn.

In the same year it was involved in a legal battle with Mulsanne Insurance concerning intellectual property, with the case ultimately settled out of court.

In 2023 the company was ranked as the 2nd fastest growing company in Europe by the Financial Times with a CAGR of 660%.
