= Secret Double Octopus =

Israeli software company

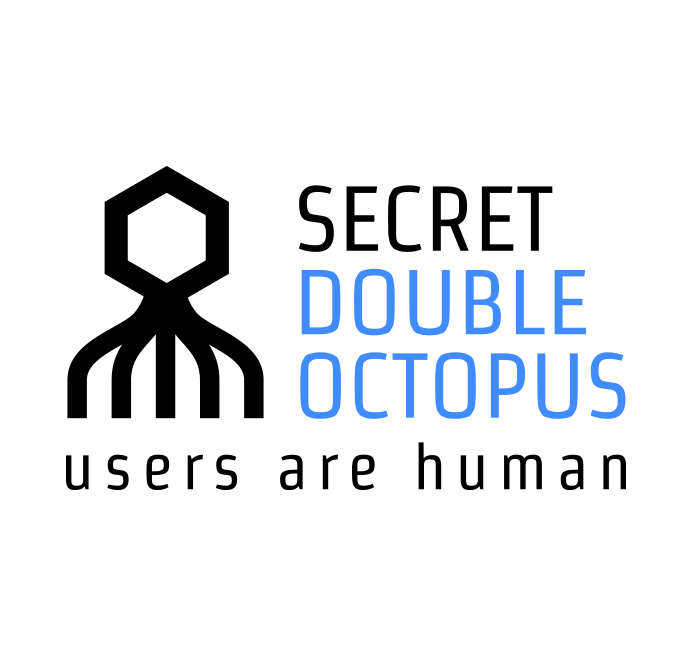
- Type: Private
- Industry: Security Software
- Founded: 2015
- Headquarters: Palo Alto, CA, USA
- Area served: Worldwide
- Services: Passwordless MFA
- Number of employees: 50
- Website: Official website

Secret Double Octopus (SDO) is a cybersecurity software company based in Tel Aviv, Israel that specializes in phishing-resistant, passwordless authentication for enterprise environments. The company's core product is based on proprietary password alternatives for password-based legacy systems and secure communications using secret sharing algorithms, originally developed to protect nuclear launch codes. SDO uses proprietary phone-as-a-token technology to prevent unauthorized use of systems while preventing identity theft.

== History ==
The company was founded in 2015 by Raz Rafaeli, Chen Tetelman, Shlomi Dolev, and Shimrit Tzur-David.

In April 2020, the company announced a $15 million Series B round to expand its passwordless authentication and remote-access security solutions for enterprises. An additional $15 million was raised in January 2024.

== Awards and recognition ==
- Gartner 'Cool Vendor' in 2016
- "50 startups that will boom according to VCs", Business Insider
- "Best in Class" for enterprise passwordless authentication by the Aite Group.
- 2023 SINET 16 Innovator Award
