= Branch (company) =

Mobile software company, headquartered in Mountain View

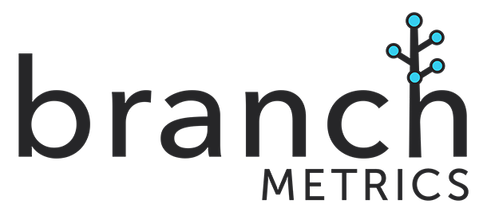
- Founded: April 15, 2014
- Headquarters: Mountain View, California, United States

Branch (formerly Branch Metrics) is a software company focused on deep linking and attribution. Its headquarter is located in Mountain View, California.

== History ==
Branch Metrics was founded on April 15, 2014, by Alex Austin, Mike Molinet, Mada Seghete, and Dmitri Gaskin. In the summer of 2014, the company completed the StartX Accelerator program at Stanford University.

In September 2014, Branch announced the completion of a $3 million venture funding round led by New Enterprise Associates. In 2015 Branch won a startup competition at Mobile World Congress.

In February 2015, the company completed a $15 million Series A funding followed by additional $35 million funding in January 2016.

In April 2017, the company raised $60 million in Series C funding from Andy Rubin’s Playground Ventures.

In September 2018, the company authorized the sale of $129 million in Series D shares, and acquired the attribution analytics platform TUNE.

In February 2022, Branch raised $300M in Series F funding at a $4B valuation, led by New Enterprise Associates.

In 2022, the company acquired Android customization applications Nova Launcher and Sesame Search, as well as data platform AdLibertas. As part of the Nova Launcher acquisition, it was contracted that the app would be open-sourced if its founder Kevin Barry left the company.

In 2023, CEO and co-founder Austin left the company.

In August 2024, Branch made significant cuts to the 12-person Nova Launcher team, laying off everyone but Barry. On September 6, 2025, Barry made an announcement that he had left Branch, effectively shutting down development of Nova Launcher and its open-sourcing effort. In late October 2025, an update to the beta version of the app was released, adding new features. Former developer Rob Wainwright commented that "the majority of the changes in this update were built by the original team over a year ago".

=== Technology ===
Branch has developed improved deep linking technology that directs users to a specific place within the app the first time a link is clicked, even if the app has not been installed. To do this, Branch Metrics is combining deep linking technology with matching technology.

Branch also uses tools for cohort analysis and touchpoint tracking.
