= Economy of Alberta =

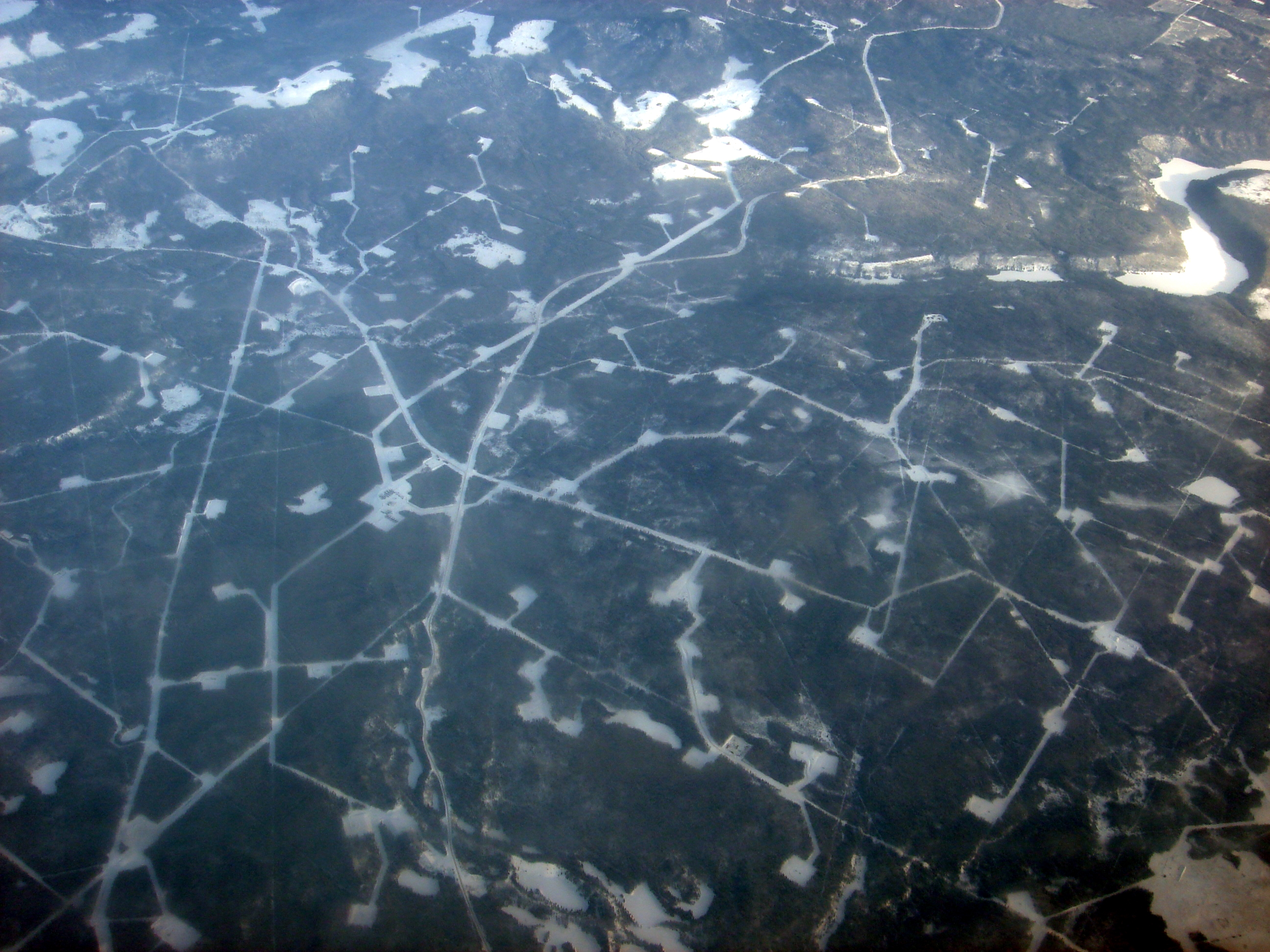
- Aerial photo of oilfield roads and drill sites in the Pembina Oil Field, 2008.
- Currency: Canadian dollar (CAD, C$)
- Fiscal year: April 1 – March 29

Statistics
- Population: ▲5,017,119 (2025)
- GDP: CAD$361 billion (2025)
- All values, unless otherwise stated, are in US dollars.

Although Alberta has a presence in many industries such as agriculture, forestry, education, tourism, finance, and manufacturing, the politics and culture of the province have been closely tied to the production of fossil energy since the 1940s. Alberta—with an estimated 1.4 billion cubic metres of unconventional oil resource in the bituminous oil sands—leads Canada as an oil producer.

Alberta's GDP in 2018 was CDN$338.2 billion. In 2018, Alberta's energy sector contributed over $71.5 billion to Canada's nominal gross domestic product. According to Statistics Canada, in May 2018, the oil and gas extraction industry reached its highest proportion of Canada's national GDP since 1985, exceeding 7% and "surpass[ing] banking and insurance" with extraction of non-conventional oil from the oilsands reaching an "impressive", all-time high in May 2018. With conventional oil extraction "climbed up to the highs from 2007", the demand for Canadian oil was strong in May.

From 1990 to 2003, Alberta's economy grew by 57% compared to 43% for all of Canada—the strongest economic growth of any region in Canada. In 2006 Alberta's per capita GDP was higher than all US states, and one of the highest figures in the world. In 2006, the deviation from the national average was the largest for any province in Canadian history. Alberta's per capita GDP in 2007 was by far the highest of any province in Canada at C$74,825 (approx. US$75,000). Alberta's per capita GDP in 2007 was 61% higher than the Canadian average of C$46,441 and more than twice that of all the Maritime provinces. From 2004 to 2014 Alberta's "exports of commodities rose 91%, reaching $121 billion in 2014" and 500,000 new jobs were created. In 2014, Alberta's real GDP by expenditure grew by 4.8%, the strongest growth rate among the provinces." In 2017, Alberta's real per capita GDP—the economic output per person—was $71,092, compared to the Canadian average of $47,417. In 2016, Alberta's A grade on its income per capita was based on the fact that it was almost "identical" to that of the "top peer country"—Ireland.

The energy industry provided 7.7% of all jobs in Alberta in 2013, and 140,300 jobs representing 6.1% of total employment of 2,286,900 in Alberta in 2017. The unemployment rate in Alberta peaked in November 2016 at 9.1%. Its lowest point in a ten-year period from July 2009 to July 2019, was in September 2013 at 4.3%. The unemployment rate in the spring of 2019 in Alberta was 6.7% with 21,000 jobs added in April. By July 2019, the seasonally adjusted unemployment rate had increased to 7.0%.

By August 2019, the employment number in Alberta was 2,344,000, following the loss of 14,000 full-time jobs in July, which represented the "largest decline" in Canada according to Statistics Canada.

Beginning in June 2014, the record high volume of worldwide oil inventories in storage—referred to as a global oil glut—caused crude oil prices to collapse at near ten-year low prices. By 2016 West Texas Intermediate (WTI)—the benchmark light, sweet crude oil—reached its lowest price in ten years—US$26.55. In 2012 the price of WTI had reached US$125 and in 2014 the price was $100. By February 2016 the price of Western Canadian Select WCS—the Alberta benchmark heavy crude oil—was US$14.10—the cheapest oil in the world. Alberta boom years from 2010 to 2014 ended with a "long and deep" recession that began in 2014, driven by low commodity pricing ended in 2017. By 2019—five years later—Alberta was still in recovery. Overall, there were approximately 35,000 jobs lost in mining, oil and gas alone. Since 2014, sectors that offered high-wage employment of $30 and above, saw about 100,000 jobs disappear—"construction (down more than 45,000 jobs), mining, oil and gas (down nearly 35,000), and professional services (down 18,000)," according to the economist, Trevor Tombe. There was a decrease in wages, in the number of jobs, and in the number of hours worked. The total loss of incomes from "workers, business, and government" amounted to about 20 percent or about CDN$75 billion less per year. Since 2011, prices have increased in Alberta by 18%. However, a typical worker in Alberta still earns more than a typical worker in all the other provinces and territories.

By March 2016, Alberta lost over 100,000 jobs in the oil patch. In spite of the surplus with the low price of WCS in 2015—99% of Canada's oil exports went to the United States and in 2015 Canada was still their largest exporter of total petroleum—3,789 thousand bpd in September—3,401 thousand bpd in October up from 3,026 thousand bpd in September 2014. By April 2019, two of the major oil companies, still had thousands of workers—Suncor had about 12,500 employees and Canadian Natural Resources had about 10,000 full-time employees.

Alberta has the "lowest taxes overall of any province or territory" in Canada, due in part to having high resource tax revenues. However, overall tax revenues from oil royalties and other non-renewable sources has fallen steeply along with the drop in global oil prices. For example, in 2013, oil tax revenues brought in 9.58 billion, or 21% of the total Provincial budget, whereas in 2018 it had fallen to just 5.43 billion, or 11% of the Provincial budget.

In the spring of 2020, Alberta's economy suffered from the economic fallout of both the COVID-19 pandemic and the 2020 Russia–Saudi Arabia oil price war."

== Data ==
GDP by sector, 2016
1. Oil, Gas, & Mining (16.4%)
2. Manufacturing (6.70%)
3. Transportation & Utilities (6.60%)
4. Business Services (11.8%)
5. Real Estate (11.7%)
6. Tourism (5.10%)
7. Retail (9.50%)
8. Public Administration (5.40%)
9. Finance & Insurance (4.80%)
10. Education (4.10%)
11. Health Care (6.30%)
12. Agriculture & Forestry (1.80%)
13. Construction (10.1%)

Year	Nominal GDP (in bil. CA-Dollar)	GDP per capita (in CA-Dollar)	Unemployment (in %)
2019	334.5	77,239	6.8%
2018	334.3	78,311	6.9%
2017	328	77,765	8.7%
2016	314.6	75,447	8.6%
2015	326.5	79,324	4.6%
2014	338.3	83,946	4.7%
2013	319.5	81,495	4.5%
2012	302.1	78,979	5.0%
2011	290.5	77,375	5.9%
2010	272.2	73,523	6.6%
2009	258.9	71,156	4.9%
2008	273.5	77,068	3.7%
2007	270	77,748	3.6%
2006	264.8	78,533	3.8%
2005	248.6	75,867	4.5%
2004	237.7	74,064	4.9%
2003	224.7	71,218	5.4%
2002	216.8	70,114	4.9%
2001	211.6	69,882	5.2%
2000	207.8	69,860	5.0%
1999	196	66,984	5.9%
1998	193.2	67,569	5.3%
1997	184.3	65,832	6.4%

== Current overview ==
According to ATB Financial's Vice President and Chief Economist—Todd Hirsch, who spoke during an April 2, 2020, webinar hosted by the Calgary Chamber of Commerce, the COVID-19 pandemic in Alberta and its "economic fallout will permanently reshape our economy." Hirsch said that he expects that the resulting contraction in Alberta's economy will be the "worst...Alberta has ever seen."

The global price of oil decreased dramatically because of the combination of COVID-19 pandemic and the 2020 Russia–Saudi Arabia oil price war. In March 2020, the United States benchmark crude oil EWest Texas Intermediate (WTI)—upon which Alberta's benchmark crude oil Western Canadian Select (WCS) price is based—dropped to an historical below of US$20 a barrel. The price of WCS bitumen-blend crude was US$3.82 per barrel by the end of March. In 2018, the low price of heavy oil negatively impacted Alberta's economic growth.

In November 2018, the price of Western Canadian Select (WCS), the benchmark for Canadian heavy crude, hit its record low of less than US$14 a barrel, as a "surge of production met limited pipeline space causing bottlenecks." Previously, from 2008 through 2018, WCS had sold at an average discount of US$17 against West Texas Intermediate (WTI)—the U.S. crude oil benchmark, but by the fall of 2018, the differential between WCS and WTI reached a record of over US$50 per barrel. In response, then Premier Rachel Notley made a December 2 announcement of a mandatory cut of 8.7% in Alberta's oil production. By December 12, after the announcement of the government's "mandated oil output curtailment", the price of WCS rose c. 70% to c. US$41 a barrel with the WTI differential falling from US50 to c. US$11., according to the Financial Post. The WCS price rose to US$28.60 by January 2019, as the international price of oil had begun to recover from the December "sharp downturn" caused by the ongoing China–U.S. trade war In March 2019, the differential of WTI over WCS decreased to $US9.94 as the price of WTI dropped to US$58.15 a barrel, which is 7.5% lower than it was in March 2018, while the price of WCS increased to US$48.21 a barrel which is 35.7% higher than in March 2018. According to TD Economics' September 2019 report, the government's "mandated oil output curtailment", has resulted in a sustained rebound in WCS prices. However, investment and spending were low in the province. The loss of 14, 000 of the full-time jobs out of 2,344,000 in Alberta in July 2019, represented the "largest decline" in employment in Canada for that month, according to Statistics Canada.

In 1985, Alberta's energy industry accounted for 36.1% of the provinces $66.8 billion GDP. In 2006, the mining, oil and gas extraction industry accounted for 29.1% of GDP; by 2012 it was 23.3%; in 2013, it was 24.6% of Alberta's $331.9 billion GDP, and in 2016, the mining, oil and gas extraction industry accounted for about 27.9% of Alberta's GDP.

By comparison, "In 2017, the federal, provincial and territorial governments spent some $724 billion on programs and more than $58 billion on interest payments on their public debt, which, combined, amounted to about 36 percent of Canada’s gross domestic product (GDP). Their combined borrowing that year was $27 billion, and their net financial debt at year-end stood at around $1.2 trillion, about 54 percent of GDP."

In his July 2019 CBC News article, economist Trevor Tombe said that prior to the 2014 recession, Albertans had experienced boom years from 2010 to 2014, with workers earnings reaching exceptional highs. The recession, which "ended over two years ago" in 2017, was "long and deep". By 2019—five years later—the province was still in recovery. Overall, there were approximately 35,000 jobs lost in mining, oil and gas alone. By 2019, the slow recovery and low earnings growth have resulted in workers getting "fewer hours, fewer jobs and, in some cases, lower wages". Tombe said that from 2014 to 2016, Alberta earned CDN$75 billion less per year with the "total incomes of workers, business, and government combined [falling] by nearly 20 per cent". Tombes said that relative to Alberta's "growth path prior to the recession" Alberta's economy is "down $100 billion per year", compared to what was anticipated. Tombes said that the "boom years that ended in 2014 were the outliers" and the lower earnings in 2019 reflect a "natural adjustment that's moving Alberta to a more normal and balanced labour market." While earnings are lower, because of inflation, prices have increased in Alberta by 18% since 2011. "The $1,183 per week a typical worker earns today goes about as far as $1,000 did nearly a decade ago.", according to Tombe. In spite of the typical worker in Alberta earns $1,183 per week compared to Saskatchewan, where the typical worker earns $1,070 per week. The weekly income a typical worker in all the other Canadian provinces and territories is less than that.

Since 2014, sectors that offered high-wage employment of $30 and above, saw about 100,000 jobs disappear—"construction (down more than 45,000 jobs), mining, oil and gas (down nearly 35,000), and professional services (down 18,000)."

== Deficit ==
Alberta's net debt was $27.5 billion by March 2019, which represents the end of the 2018-19 fiscal year (FY). By November 2018, Alberta's government expenditures were $55 billion while the revenue was about $48 billion, according to a report by the University of Calgary's School of Public Policy (SPP) economist, Trevor Tombe. Capital investment amounted to $4.3 billion. The provincial government employs more than "210,000 full-time equivalent workers across hundreds of departments, boards and other entities." Tombe, cited a $8.3 billion deficit in his November report, prior to the release in February 2019 of the corrected deficit figures, which was "$1.9 billion less in 2018-19 than originally expected", —$6.9-billion deficit instead of the original $8.8-billion".

Alberta's current deficit is "unusual for the province", says Tombe in 2018. During the financial crisis, Alberta's "net asset position equivalent to 15 per cent of GDP"−it "owned more financial assets than it owed in debt."

In 2009 Alberta had $31.7 billion in financial assets.

Net government debt to GDP by province March 2019
BC	Alberta	Saskatchewan	Manitoba	Ontario	Quebec	New Brunswick	Nova Scotia	Prince Edward Island	Newfoundland
15.5%	8.7%	15.4%	34.2%	37.6%	43%	40%	34.2	33%	47.3%

== Credit rating ==
On December 3, 2019, Moody's downgraded Alberta's credit rating from Aa2 stable from Aa1 negative and "downgraded the long-term debt ratings of the Alberta Capital Finance Authority and the long-term issuer rating of ATB Financial to Aa2 from Aa1." The agency said that there is a "structural weakness in the provincial economy that remains concentrated and dependent on non-renewable resources ... and remains pressured by a lack of sufficient pipeline capacity to transport oil efficiently with no near-term expectation of a significant rebound in oil-related investments...Alberta's oil and gas sector is carbon-intensive and Alberta's greenhouse gas emissions are the highest among provinces. Alberta is also susceptible to natural disasters including wildfires and floods which could lead to significant mitigation costs by the province."

== Real per capita GDP ==
In 2006 Alberta's per capita GDP was higher than all US states, and one of the highest figures in the world. In 2006, the deviation from the national average was the largest for any province in Canadian history. In 2007, Alberta's per capita GDP in 2007 was C$74,825 (approx. US$75,000)—by far the highest of any Canadian province—61% higher than the Canadian average of C$46,441 and more than twice that of all the Maritime provinces. In 2017, Alberta's real per capita GDP—the economic output per person—was $71,092, compared to the Canadian average of $47,417. Alberta's A grade on its income per capita was based on the fact that it was almost "identical" to that of the "top peer country" in 2016, Ireland.

In 2017, Alberta's real per capita GDP—the economic output per person—was $71,092 compared to the Canadian average output per person of $47, 417 and Prince Edward Island at $32,123 per person. Since at least 1997, Alberta's per capita GDP has been higher than that of any other province. In 2014, Alberta's reached its highest gap ever—$30,069—between its real capita GDP and the Canadian average.

According to the Conference Board of Canada, in 2016 Alberta earned an "A grade with income per capita almost identical to the top peer country, Ireland." In 2016 income per capita in Alberta was $59,259.

Alberta Income per capita
1981	1988	1991	1997	2000	2003	2005	2007	2009	2010	2014	2016
42,441	45,995	45,393	53,748	57,106	57,646	61,163	62,518	57,321	59,254	66,031	59,249

== GDP compared to other provinces ==
A table listing annual ""Gross domestic product (GDP) at basic prices, by industry, provinces and territories (x 1,000,000)." from 2014 through 2018 with value chained to 2012 dollars.

Province or Territory	GDP (million CAD, 2014)	GDP (million CAD, 2015)	GDP (million CAD, 2016)	GDP (million CAD, 2017)	GDP (million CAD, 2018)
British Columbia	219,060.9	224,153.4	231,509.9	240,657.9	246,506.3
Alberta	338,262.6	326,476.7	313,241.5	327,596.2	335,095.6
Saskatchewan	80,175.7	79,574.2	79,364.4	81,179.0	82,502.7
Manitoba	58,276.3	59,082.5	60,066.2	61,941.2	62,723.1
Ontario	659,861.2	677,384.0	693,900.4	712,984.3	728,363.7
Quebec	338,319.0	341,688.0	346,713.7	356,677.9	365,614.4
New Brunswick	29,039.6	29,275.7	29,686.3	30,271.8	30,295.3
Prince Edward Island	5,205.6	5,280.7	5,372.2	5,553.3	5,700.0
Nova Scotia	34,747.2	35,013.4	35,549.3	36,075.4	36,518.2
Newfoundland and Labrador	31,143.3	30,806.0	31,334.5	31,610.6	30,757.9
Yukon	2,510.9	2,320.2	2,482.5	2,554.5	2,626.1
Northwest Territories	4,574.6	4,621.3	4,679.8	4,861.3	4,954.7
Nunavut	2,363.6	2,353.0	2,434.3	2,685.3	2,955.0

Source: Statistics Canada: GDP (totals),

== Economic geography ==
Alberta's location within Canada

Alberta has a small internal market, and it is relatively distant from major world markets, despite good transportation links to the rest of Canada and to the United States to the south. Alberta is located in the northwestern quadrant of North America, in a region of low population density called the Interior Plains. Alberta is landlocked, and separated by a series of mountain ranges from the nearest outlets to the Pacific Ocean, and by the Canadian Shield from ports on the Lakehead or Hudson Bay. From these ports to major populations centres and markets in Europe or Asia is several thousands of kilometers. The largest population clusters of North America (the Boston – Washington, San Francisco - San Diego, Chicago – Pittsburgh, and Quebec City – Windsor Corridors) are all thousands of kilometers away from Alberta. Partly for this reason, Alberta has never developed a large presence in the industries that have traditionally started industrialization in other places (notably the original Industrial Revolution in Great Britain) but which require large labour forces, and large internal markets or easy transportation to export markets, namely textiles, metallurgy, or transportation-related manufacturing (automotives, ships, or train cars).

Agriculture has been a key industry since the 1870s. The climate is dry, temperate, and continental, with extreme variations between seasons. Productive soils are found in most of the southern half of the province (excluding the mountains), and in certain parts of the north. Agriculture on a large scale is practiced further north in Alberta than anywhere else in North America, extending into the Peace River country above the 55th parallel north. Generally, however, northern Alberta (and areas along the Alberta Rockies) is forested land and logging is more important than agriculture there. Agriculture is divided into primarily field crops in the east, livestock in the west, and a mixture in between and in the parkland belt in the near north.

Conventional oil and gas fields are found throughout the province on an axis running from the northwest to the southeast. Oil sands are found in the northeast, especially around Fort McMurray (the Athabasca Oil Sands).

Because of its (relatively) economically isolated location, Alberta relies heavily on transportation links with the rest of the world. Alberta's historical development has been largely influenced by the development of new transportation infrastructure, (see "trends" below). Alberta is now served by two major transcontinental railways (CN and CP), by three major highway connections to the Pacific (the Trans-Canada via Kicking Horse Pass, the Yellowhead via Yellowhead Pass and the Crowsnest via Crowsnest Pass), and one to the United States (Interstate 15), as well as two international airports (Calgary and Edmonton). Also, Alberta is connected to the TransCanada pipeline system (natural gas) to Eastern Canada, the Northern Border Pipeline (gas), Alliance Pipeline (gas) and Enbridge Pipeline System (oil) to the Eastern United States, the Gas Transmission Northwest and Northwest Pipeline (gas) to the Western United States, and the McNeill HVDC Back-to-back station (electric power) to Saskatchewan.

=== Economic regions and cities ===
Since the days of early agricultural settlement, the majority of Alberta's population has been concentrated in the parkland belt (mixed forest-grassland), a boomerang-shaped strip of land extending along the North Saskatchewan River from Lloydminster to Edmonton and then along the Rocky Mountain Foothills south to Calgary. This area is slightly more humid and treed than the drier prairie (grassland) region called Palliser's Triangle to its south, and large areas of the south (the "Special Areas") were depopulated during the droughts of the 1920s and 30s. The chernozem (black soil) of the parkland region is more agriculturally productive than the red and grey soils to the south. Urban development has also been most advanced in the parkland belt. Edmonton and Red Deer are parkland cities, while Calgary is on the parkland-prairie fringe. Lethbridge and Medicine Hat are prairie cities. Grande Prairie lies in the Peace River Country a parkland region (with isolated patches of prairie, hence the name) in the northwest isolated from the rest of the parkland by the forested Swan Hills. Fort McMurray is the only urbanized population centre in the boreal forest which covers much of the northern half of the province.

==== Calgary and Edmonton ====
The Calgary and Edmonton regions, by far the province's two largest metropolitan regions, account for the majority of the province's population. They are relatively close to each other by the standards of Western Canada and distant from other metropolitan regions such as Vancouver or Winnipeg. This has produced a history of political and economic rivalry and comparison but also economic integration that has created an urbanized corridor between the two cities.

The economic profile of the two regions is slightly different. Both cities are mature service economies built on a base of resource extraction in their hinterlands. However, Calgary is predominant in hosting the regional and national headquarters of oil and gas exploration and drilling companies. Edmonton skews much more towards governments, universities and hospitals as large employers, while Edmonton's suburban fringes (e.g. Fort Saskatchewan, Nisku, Strathcona County (Refinery Row), Leduc, Beaumont, Acheson) are home to most of the province's manufacturing (much of it related to oil and gas).

===== Calgary-Edmonton Corridor =====
The Calgary-Edmonton Corridor is the most urbanized region in the province and one of the densest in Canada. Measured from north to south, the region covers a distance of roughly 400 kilometres (250 mi). In 2001, the population of the Calgary-Edmonton Corridor was 2.15 million (72% of Alberta's population). It is also one of the fastest-growing regions in the country. A 2003 study by TD Bank Financial Group found the corridor was the only Canadian urban centre to amass a U.S. level of wealth while maintaining a Canadian-style quality of life, offering universal health care benefits. The study found GDP per capita in the corridor was 10% above average U.S. metropolitan areas and 40% above other Canadian cities at that time.

===== Calgary–Edmonton rivalry =====
Seeing Calgary and Edmonton as part of a single economic region as the TD study did in 2003 was novel. The more traditional view had been to see the two cities as economic rivals. For example, in the 1980 both cities claimed to be the "Oil Capital of Canada".

== Background ==
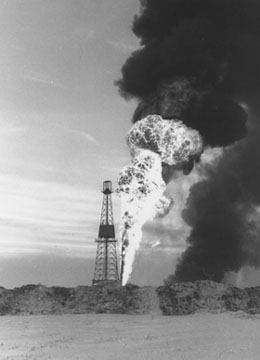
The Leduc No. 1 well, which blew in 1947, marked the beginning of series of petroleum-related economic booms.

Alberta has always been an export-oriented economy. In line with Harold Innis' "Staples Thesis", the economy has changed substantially as different export commodities have risen or fallen in importance. In sequence, the most important products have been: fur, wheat and beef, and oil and gas.

The development of transportation in Alberta has been crucial to its historical economic development. The North American fur trade relied on birch-bark canoes, York boats, and Red River carts on age-old Native trails and buffalo trails to move furs out of, and European trade goods into, the region. Immigration into the province was eased tremendously by the building of the Canadian Pacific Railway's transcontinental line across southern Alberta in 1880s. Commercial farming became viable in the area once the grain trade had developed technologies to handle the bulk export of grain, especially hopper cars and grain elevators. Oil and gas exports have been possible because of increasing pipeline technology.

Prior to the 1950s, Alberta was a primarily agricultural economy, based on the export of wheat, beef, and a few other agricultural products. The health of economy was closely bound up with the price of wheat.

In 1947 a major oil field was discovered near Edmonton. It was not the first petroleum find in Alberta, but it was large and spawned an industry that significantly altered the economy of the province (and coincided with growing American demand for energy). Since that time, Alberta's economic fortunes have largely tracked the price of oil, and increasingly natural gas prices. When oil prices spiked during the 1967 Oil Embargo, 1973 oil crisis, and 1979 energy crisis, Alberta's economy boomed. However, during the 1980s oil glut Alberta's economy suffered. Alberta boomed once again during the 2003-2008 oil price spike. In July 2008 the price of oil peaked and began to decline, and Alberta's economy soon followed suit, with unemployment doubling within a year. By 2009 with natural gas prices at a long-term low, Alberta's economy was in poor health compared to before, although still relatively better than many other comparable jurisdictions. By 2012 natural gas prices were at a ten-year low and the Canadian dollar was highly valued compared to the U.S. dollar, but then oil prices recovered until June 2014.

The spin-offs from petroleum allowed Alberta to develop many other industries. Oilpatch-related manufacturing is an obvious example, but financial services and government services have also benefited from oil money.

A comparison of the development of Alberta's less oil and gas-endowed neighbours, Saskatchewan and Manitoba, reveals the role petroleum has played. Alberta was the least-populous of the three Prairie Provinces in the early 20th century, but by 2009, Alberta's population was 3,632,483, approximately three times as much as either Saskatchewan (1,023,810) or Manitoba (1,213,815).

== Employment ==
Alberta's economy is a highly developed one in which most people work in services such as healthcare, government, or retail. Primary industries are also of great importance, however.

By March 2016 the unemployment rate in Alberta rose to 7.9%— its "highest level since April 1995 and the first time the province’s rate has surpassed the national average since December 1988." There were 21,200 fewer jobs than February 2015. The unemployment rate was expected to average 7.4% in 2016. The Canadian Association of Petroleum Producers (CAPP) claimed that Alberta lost 35,000 jobs in 2015–25,000 from the oil services sector and 10,000 from exploration and production. Full-time employment increased by 10,000 in February 2016 after falling 20,000 in both December 2015 and January 2016. The natural resources industry lost 7,400 jobs in February. "Year-over-year (y/y), the goods sector lost 56,000 jobs, while the services sector gained 34,800." In 2015 Alberta's population increased by 3,900. While Alberta had a reprieve in job loss in February 2016—up 1,400 jobs after losing jobs in October, November, December 2015 and January 2016—Ontario lost 11,200 jobs, Saskatchewan lost 7,800 jobs and New Brunswick lost 5,700 jobs.

The unemployment rate in spring 2019 in Alberta was 6.7% with 21,000 jobs added in April; in Calgary it was 7.4%, in Edmonton it was 6.9%, in Northern Alberta it was 11.2%, and in Southern Alberta it was 7.8%. By July 2019, the seasonally adjusted unemployment rate had increased to 7.0%, which represented an increase of 0.3% from the previous year. The unemployment rate in Alberta peaked in November 2016 at 9.1%. Its lowest point in a ten-year period from July 2009 to July 2019 was in September 2013 at 4.3%.

By August 2019, the employment number in Alberta was 2,344,000, following the loss of 14,000 full-time jobs in July, which represented that the "largest decline" in Canada according to Statistics Canada.

Employment by industry, Alberta – seasonally adjusted (000s)

Industries	August 2019	July 2019	August 2018
All industries	2,344.3	2,343.7	2,340.2
Goods-producing sector	589.6	595.6	602.1
Agriculture	49.9	50.7	48.5
Forestry, fishing, mining, oil and gas	138.3	144.3	154.4
Utilities	24.5	24.1	23.7
Construction	241.9	242.1	246.5
Manufacturing	134.9	134.5	129.0
Services-Producing Sector	1,754.8	1,748.1	1,738.1
Trade	339.3	340.0	337.1
Transportation and Warehousing	139.4	140.0	138.3
Finance, Insurance, Real Estate and Leasing	105.7	107.2	102.3
Professional, Scientific and Technical Services	187.2	185.4	181.5
Business, Building and Other Support Services	83.2	84.4	88.6
Educational Services	157.2	157.7	160.7
Health Care and Social Assistance	292.4	290.6	278.8
Information, Culture and Recreation	79.0	74.3	78.7
Accommodation and Food Services	140.4	136.7	146.6
Other Services	115.1	118.2	116.7
Public Administration	116.0	113.6	108.8

=== Extraction industries ===
According to the Government of Alberta, the "mining and oil and gas extraction industry accounted for 6.1% of total employment in Alberta in 2017". By April 2019, there were about 145,100 people working directly with the oil and gas industry. In 2013, there were 171,200 people employed in the mining and oil and gas extraction industry.

In 2007 there were 146,900 people working in the mining and oil and gas extraction industry.

- Oil and Gas Extraction industry = 69,900
- Support Activities for Mining & Oil & Gas Extraction (primarily oil and gas exploration and drilling) = 71,700
- Mining other than oil and gas (mainly coal and mineral mining & quarrying) = 5,100

=== Largest employers ===
According to Alberta Venture magazine's list of the 50 largest employers in the province, the largest employers are:

Rank (2012)	Rank (2010)	Rank (2007)	Employer	Industry	2019 Employees (Total)	2012 Employees (Total)	2010 Employees (Total)	2007 Employees (Total)	Head office	Description	Notes
1	1	*	Alberta Health Services	Healthcare	102,700	99,400	92,200	see note	Edmonton	Provincial public health authority	Created in 2008 by merging nine separate provincial health authorities.
2	2	4.	Canada Safeway Limited	Wholesale and Retail Trade		30,000	30,000	34,318	Calgary	Food and drug retailer	subsidiary of Sobeys Inc. since 2014, before that subsidiary of American chain
3	6	n/a	Agrium Inc.	Agri-business	15,200 (2016)	14,800	11,153	n/a	Calgary	Wholesale producer, distributor and retailer of agricultural products and services in North and South America	n/a = not listed in 2007
4	7	8	University of Alberta	Education		14,500	10,800	11,000	Edmonton	Publicly funded accredited university	
5	4	29	Canadian Pacific Railway	Transportation	12,695	14,169	14,970	15,232	Calgary	Railway and inter-modal transportation services	
6	5	31	Suncor Energy	Petroleum Resource Industry	~12,500	13,026	12,978	5,800	Calgary	Petroleum extraction, refining, and retail	Merged with Petro-Canada in 2009
7	9	35	Shaw Communications	Communications		12,500	10,000	8,985	Calgary	Provider of digital telecommunications services [cable television / internet / telephony] and community television production facilities	
8	8	15	Flint Energy Services Ltd.	Energy		11,211	10,280	6,169	Calgary	Energy / Construction	
9	11	n/a	Stantec Inc.	Professional Services		11,100	9,300	n/a	Edmonton	Architecture/Engineering/Construction	n/a = not listed in 2007
10	12	9	Calgary Board of Education	Public Education	14,000	9,106	9,278	10,972	Calgary	Municipal K-12 Public Education School Board	

== Sectors ==
=== Oil and gas extraction industries ===
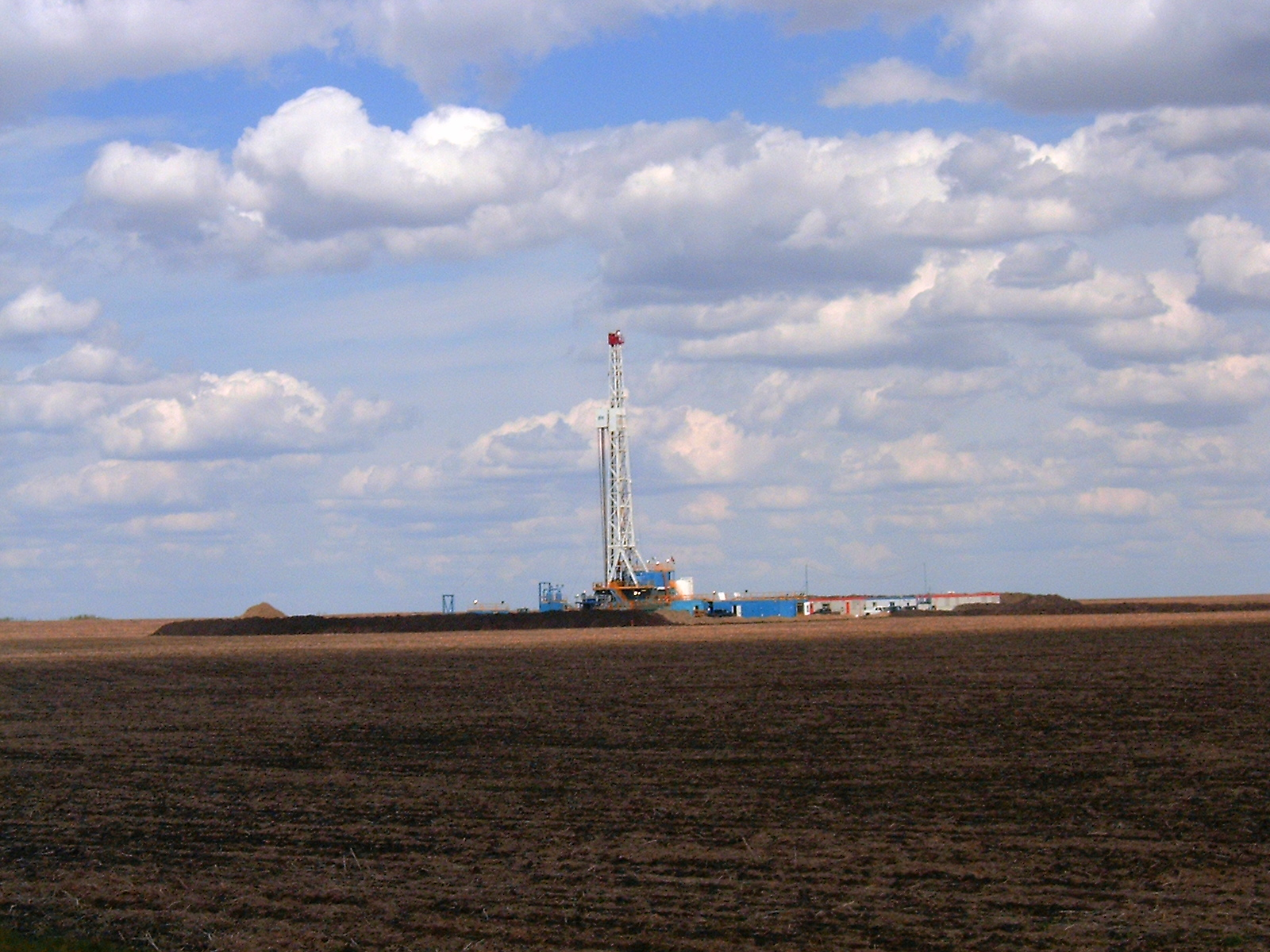
Drilling rig in Alberta.

In 2018, Alberta's energy sector contributed over $71.5 billion to Canada's nominal gross domestic product. In 2006, it accounted for 29.1% of Alberta's GDP; by 2012 it was 23.3%; in 2013, it was 24.6%, and in 2016 it was 27.9%. According to Statistics Canada, in May 2018, the oil and gas extraction industry reached its highest proportion of Canada's national GDP since 1985, exceeding 7% and "surpass[ing] banking and insurance". with extraction of non-conventional oil from the oilsands reaching an "impressive", all-time high in May 2018. With conventional oil extraction "climbed up to the highs from 2007", the demand for Canadian oil was strong in May.

Alberta is the largest producer of conventional crude oil, synthetic crude, natural gas and gas products in the country. Alberta is the world's 2nd largest exporter of natural gas and the 4th largest producer. Two of the largest producers of petrochemicals in North America are located in central and north central Alberta. In both Red Deer and Edmonton, world class polyethylene and vinyl manufacturers produce products shipped all over the world, and Edmonton's oil refineries provide the raw materials for a large petrochemical industry to the east of Edmonton. Since the early 1940s, Alberta had supplied oil and gas to the rest of Canada and the United States. The Athabasca River region produces oil for internal and external use. The Athabasca Oil Sands contain the largest proven reserves of oil in the world outside Saudi Arabia.

The Athabasca Oil Sands (sometimes known as the Athabasca Tar sands) have estimated unconventional oil reserves approximately equal to the conventional oil reserves of the rest of the world, estimated to be 1.6 trillion barrels (250×10^{9} m^{3}). With the development of new extraction methods such as steam-assisted gravity drainage (SAGD), which was developed in Alberta, bitumen and synthetic crude oil can be produced at costs close to those of conventional crude. Many companies employ both conventional strip mining and non-conventional in situ methods to extract the bitumen from the oil sands. With current technology and at current prices, about 315 billion barrels (50.1×10^{9} m^{3}) of bitumen are recoverable. Fort McMurray, one of Canada's fastest growing cities, has grown enormously in recent years because of the large corporations which have taken on the task of oil production. As of late 2006 there were over $100 billion in oil sands projects under construction or in the planning stages in northeastern Alberta.

Another factor determining the viability of oil extraction from the oil sands was the price of oil. The oil price increases since 2003 made it more than profitable to extract this oil, which in the past would give little profit or even a loss.

Alberta's economy was negatively impacted by the 2015-2016 oil glut with a record high volume of worldwide oil inventories in storage, with global crude oil collapsing at near ten-year low prices. The United States doubled its 2008 production levels mainly due to substantial improvements in shale "fracking" technology, OPEC members consistently exceeded their production ceiling, and China experienced a marked slowdown in economic growth and crude oil imports.

Mining and Oil and Gas Extraction Industry (2017)

	Alberta	Mining and Oil and Gas Extraction Industry
Employment	2,286,900	140,300
Employment Share	N/A	6.1%
Unemployment	194,700	8,800
Unemployment rate	7.8%	5.9%

- Data Source: Statistics Canada, Labour Force Survey, CANSIM Table 282–0008, 2017 "Employment share is obtained by dividing the number of employment in this industry by total employment in Alberta."

==== Natural gas ====
Natural gas has been found at several points, and in 1999, the production of natural gas liquids (ethane, propane, and butanes) totalled 172.8 million barrels (27.47×10^{6} m^{3}), valued at $2.27 billion. Alberta also provides 13% of all the natural gas used in the United States.

Notable gas reserves were discovered in the 1883 near Medicine Hat. The town of Medicine Hat began using gas for lighting the town, and supplying light and fuel for the people, and a number of industries using the gas for manufacturing.

One of North America's benchmarks is Alberta gas-trading price—the AECO "C" spot price.

In 2018, 69% of the marketable natural gas in Canada was produced in Alberta. Forty nine per cent of Alberta's natural gas production is consumed in Alberta. In Alberta, the average household uses 135 gigajoules (38,000 kWh) of natural gas annually. Domestic demand for natural gas is divided across sectors, with the highest demand—83% coming from "industrial, electrical generation, transportation and other sectors," and 17 percent going towards residential and commercial sectors. Of the provinces, Alberta is the largest consumer of natural gas at 3.9 billion cubic feet per day.

By August 2019, the Financial Post said that "AECO daily and monthly natural gas prices" were at the lowest they have been since 1992. Canada's largest natural gas producer, Canadian Natural Resources Ltd., announced in early August that it had "shut in gas production of 27,000 million cubic feet per day because of depressed prices. Previously natural gas pipeline drilled in the southern Alberta and shipped to markets in Eastern Canada. By 2019, the entire natural gas industry had was primarily operating in northwestern Alberta and northeastern B.C., which resulted in strained infrastructure. New systems will not be complete until 2021 or 2023. In September 25, 2017 Alberta's benchmark AECO natural gas prices fell into "negative territory – "meaning producers have had to pay customers to take their gas". It happened again in early October with the price per gigajoule dropping to -7 cents. TransCanada (now TC Energy Corp)—which "owns and operates Alberta's "largest natural gas gathering and transmission system, interrupted its pipeline service in the fall of 2017 to complete field maintenance on the Alberta system. In July 2018, RS Energy Group's energy analyst Samir Kayande, said that faced with a glut of natural gas across North America, the continental market price was $3 per gigajoule. Alberta is "awash" with natural gas but faces pipeline bottlenecks. CEOs of nine Alberta natural gas producers requested the Kenney government to mandate production cuts to deal with the crisis. On June 30, the AECO price of gas dropped to 11 cents per gigajoule, because of maintenance issues with the pipeline giant TC Energy Corp.

In 2003 Alberta produced 4.97 trillion cubic feet (141×10^{9} m^{3}) of marketable natural gas. That year, 62% of Alberta's natural gas was shipped to the United States, 24% was used within Alberta, and 14% was used in the rest of Canada. In 2006, Alberta consumed 1.45 trillion cubic feet (41×10^{9} m^{3}) of natural gas. The rest was exported across Canada and to the United States. Royalties to Alberta from natural gas and its byproducts are larger than royalties from crude oil and bitumen. In 2006, there were 13,473 successful natural gas wells drilled in Alberta: 12,029 conventional gas wells and 1,444 coalbed methane wells. There may be up to 500 trillion cubic feet (14×10^{12} m^{3}) of coalbed methane in Alberta, although it is unknown how much of this gas might be recoverable. Alberta has one of the most extensive natural gas systems in the world as part of its energy infrastructure, with 39,000 kilometres (24,000 mi) of energy related pipelines.

=== Coal ===
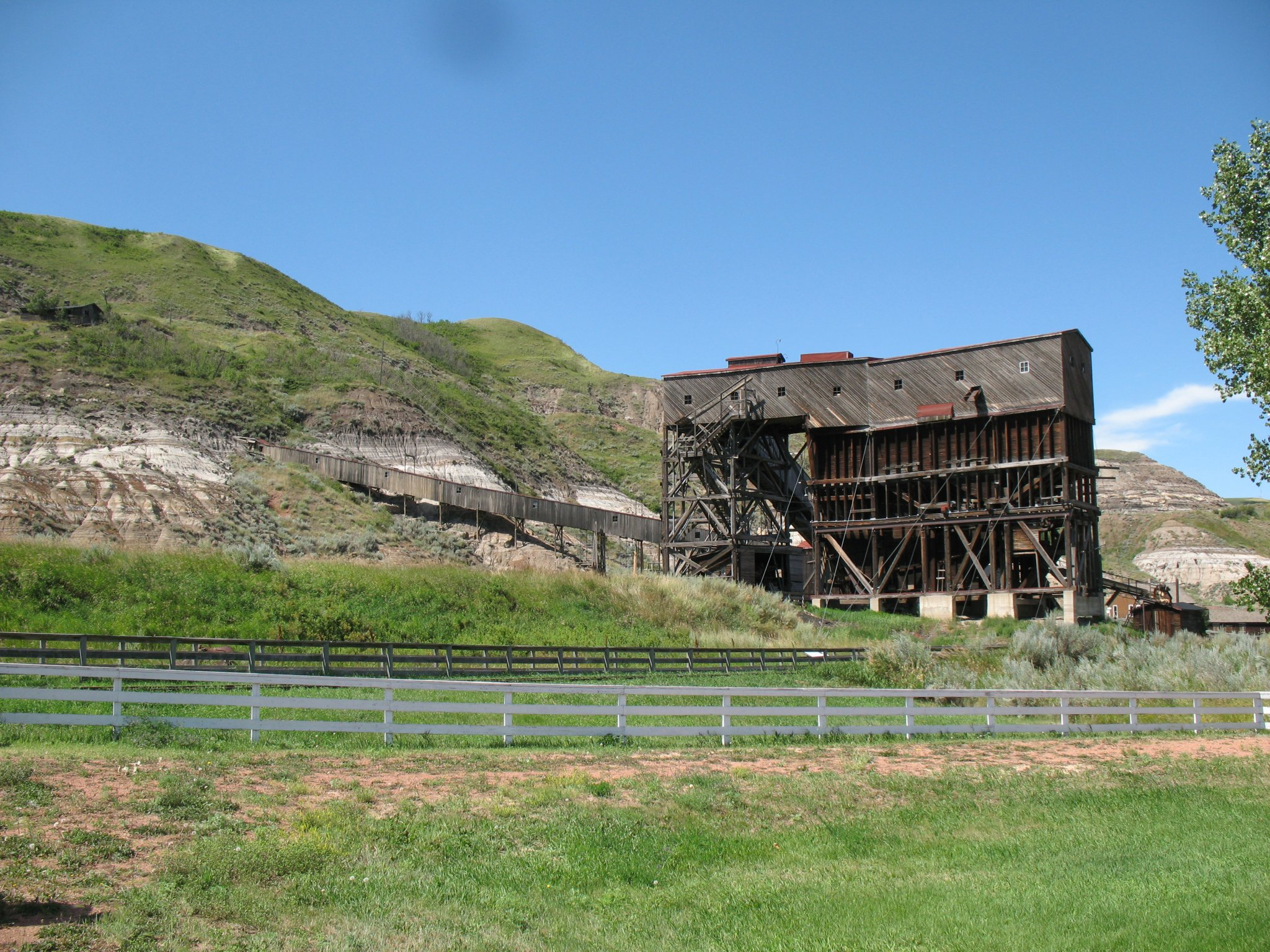
Remains of the former Atlas Coal Mine, near Drumheller, now a National Historic Site of Canada.

Coal has been mined in Alberta since the late 19th century. Over 1800 mines have operated in Alberta since then.

The coal industry was vital to the early development of several communities, especially those in the foothills and along deep river valleys where coal was close to the surface.

Alberta is still a major coal producer, every two weeks Alberta produces enough coal to fill the Sky Dome in Toronto.

Much of that coal is burned in Alberta for electricity generation. By 2008, Alberta used over 25 million tonnes of coal annually to generate electricity. However, Alberta is set to retire coal power by 2023, ahead of 2030 provincial deadline.

Alberta has vast coal resources and 70 per cent of Canada's coal reserves are located in Alberta. This amounts to 33.6 Gigatonnes.

Vast beds of coal are found extending for hundreds of miles, a short distance below the surface of the plains. The coal belongs to the Cretaceous beds, and while not so heavy as that of the Coal Measures in England is of excellent quality. In the valley of the Bow River, alongside the Canadian Pacific Railway, valuable beds of anthracite coal are still worked. The usual coal deposits of the area of bituminous or semi-bituminous coal. These are largely worked at Lethbridge in southern Alberta and Edmonton in the centre of the province. Many other parts of the province have pits for private use.

=== Electricity ===
As of June 2016, Alberta's generating capacity was 16,261 MW, and Alberta has about 26,000 kilometres (16,200 mi) of transmission lines.

Alberta has 1491 megawatts of wind power capacity.

Production of electricity in Alberta in 2016 by source:

Generation	GWh	Share by Fuel
Coal	42,227	50.2%
Natural Gas	33,184	39.4%
Hydro	1,773	2.1%
Wind	4,408	5.2%
Biomass	2,201	2.6%
Others	338	0.4%
Total	84,132	100%

Alberta has added 9,000 MW of new supply since 1998.

Peak for power use in one day was set on July 9, 2015 – 10,520 MW.

=== Mineral mining ===
Building stones mined in Alberta include Rundle stone, and Paskapoo sandstone.

Diamonds were first found in Alberta in 1958, and many stones have been found since, although to date no large-scale mines have been developed.

=== Manufacturing ===
The Edmonton area, and in particular Nisku is a major centre for manufacturing oil and gas related equipment. As well Edmonton's Refinery Row is home to a petrochemical industry.

According to a 2016 Statistics Canada report Alberta's manufacturing sales year-over-year sales fell 13.2 per cent, with a loss of almost four per cent from December to January. Alberta's economy continued to shrink because of the collapse of the oil and gas sector. The petroleum and coal product manufacturing industry is now third— behind food and chemicals.

=== Biotechnology ===
Several companies and services in the biotech sector are clustered around the University of Alberta, for example ColdFX.

=== Food processing ===
Owing to the strength of agriculture, food processing was once a major part of the economies of Edmonton and Calgary, but this sector has increasingly moved to smaller centres such as Brooks, the home of XL Foods, responsible for one third of Canada's beef processing in 2011.

=== Transportation ===
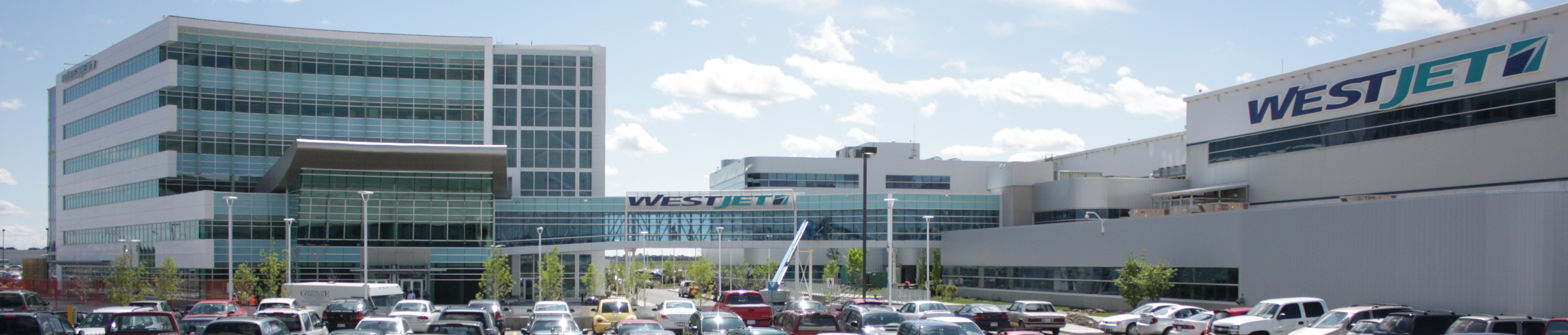
Headquarters of the airline WestJet, in Calgary.

Edmonton is a major distribution centre for northern communities, hence the nickname "Gateway to the North". Edmonton is one of CN Rail's most important hubs. Since 1996, Canadian Pacific Railway has its headquarters in downtown Calgary.

WestJet, Canada's second largest air carrier, is headquartered in Calgary, by Calgary International Airport, which serves as the airline's primary hub. Prior to its dissolution, Canadian Airlines was headquartered in Calgary by the airport. Prior to its dissolution, Air Canada subsidiary Zip was headquartered in Calgary.

=== Agriculture and forestry ===
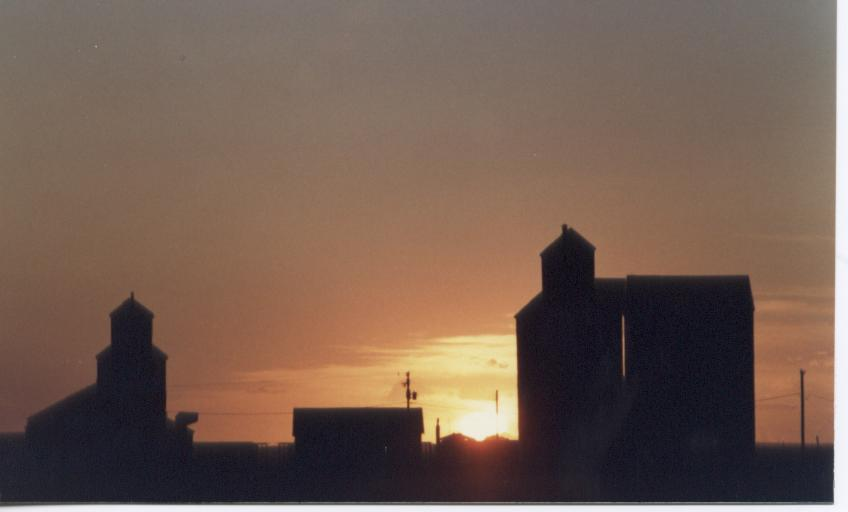
Grain elevator in southern Alberta

==== Agriculture ====
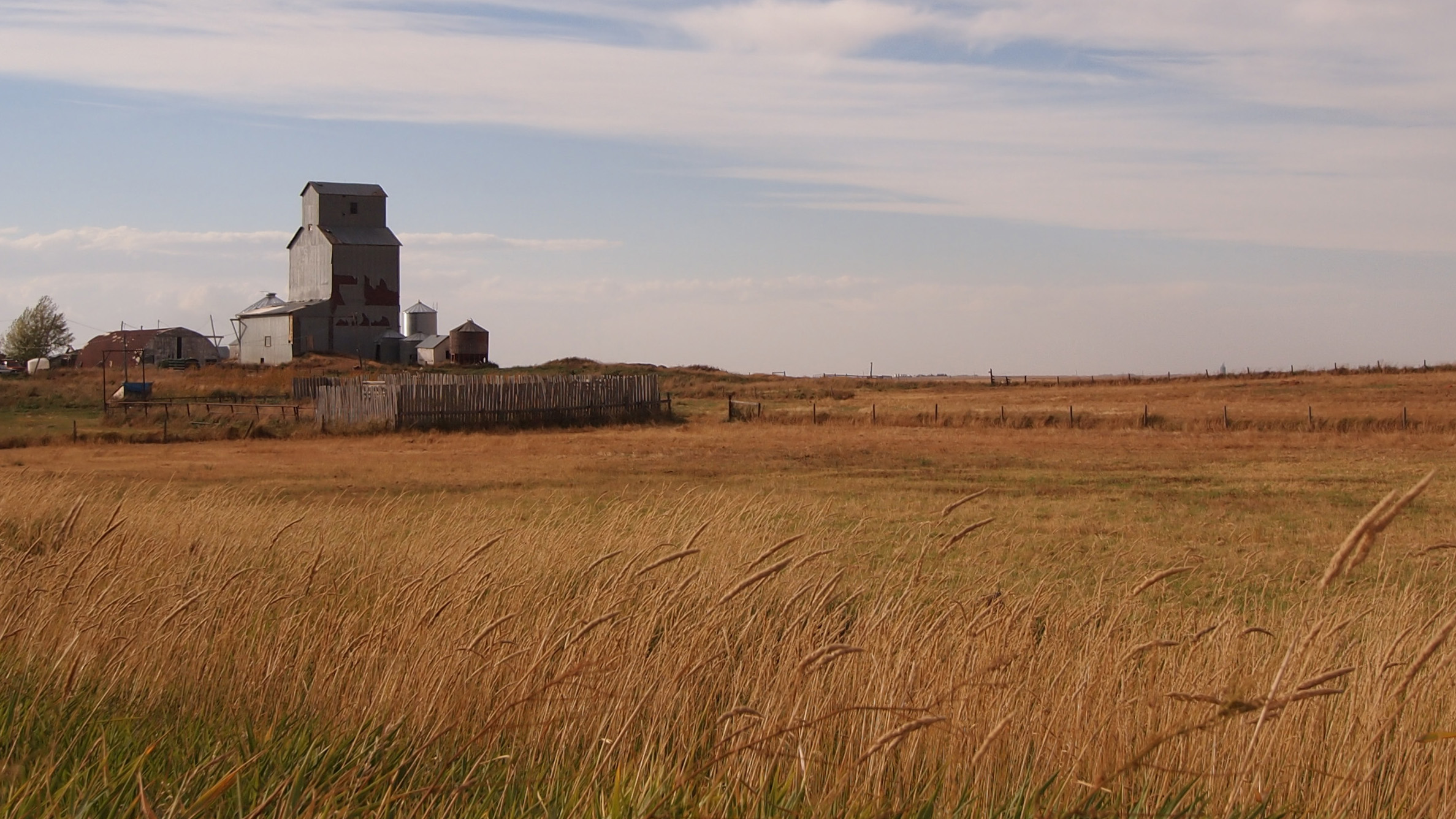

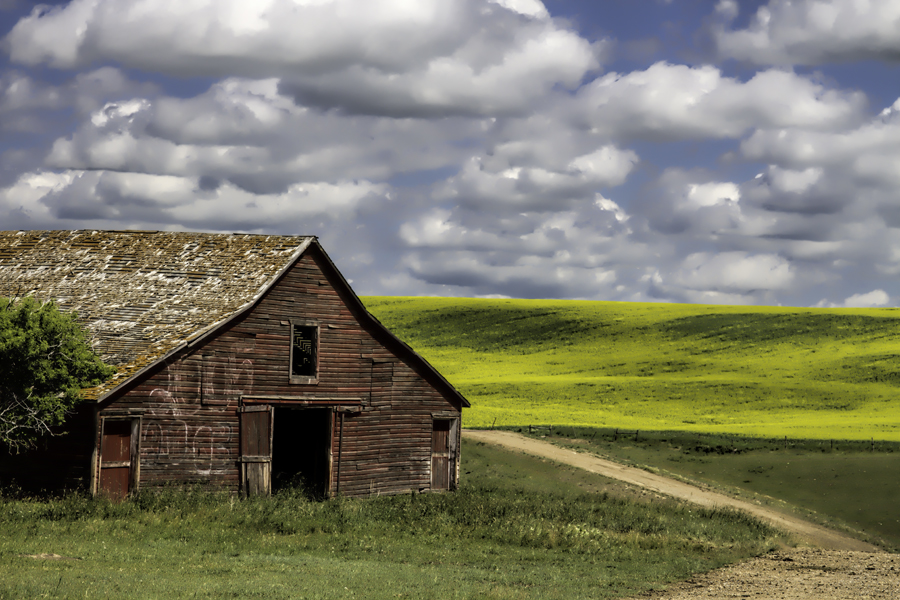

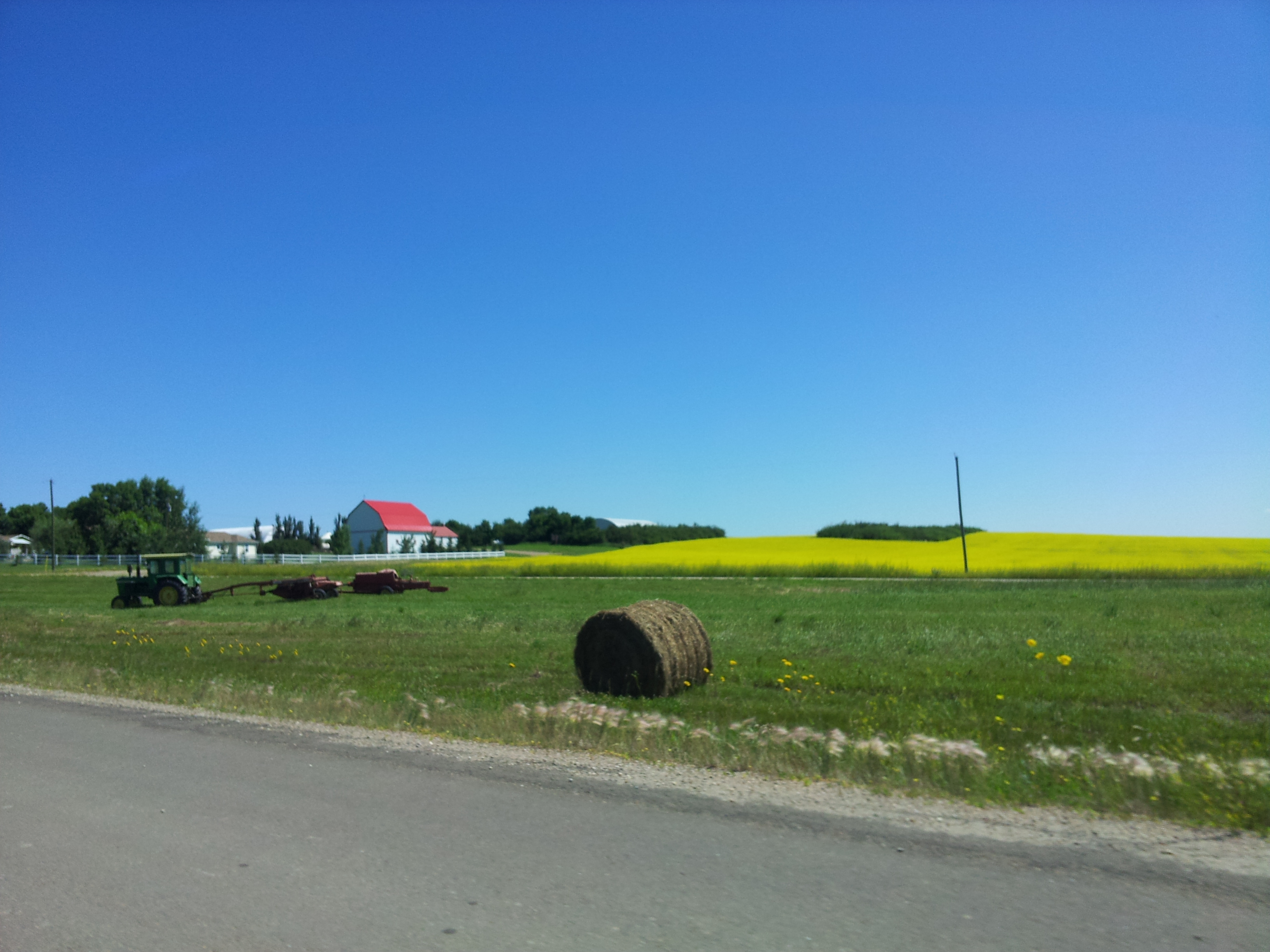

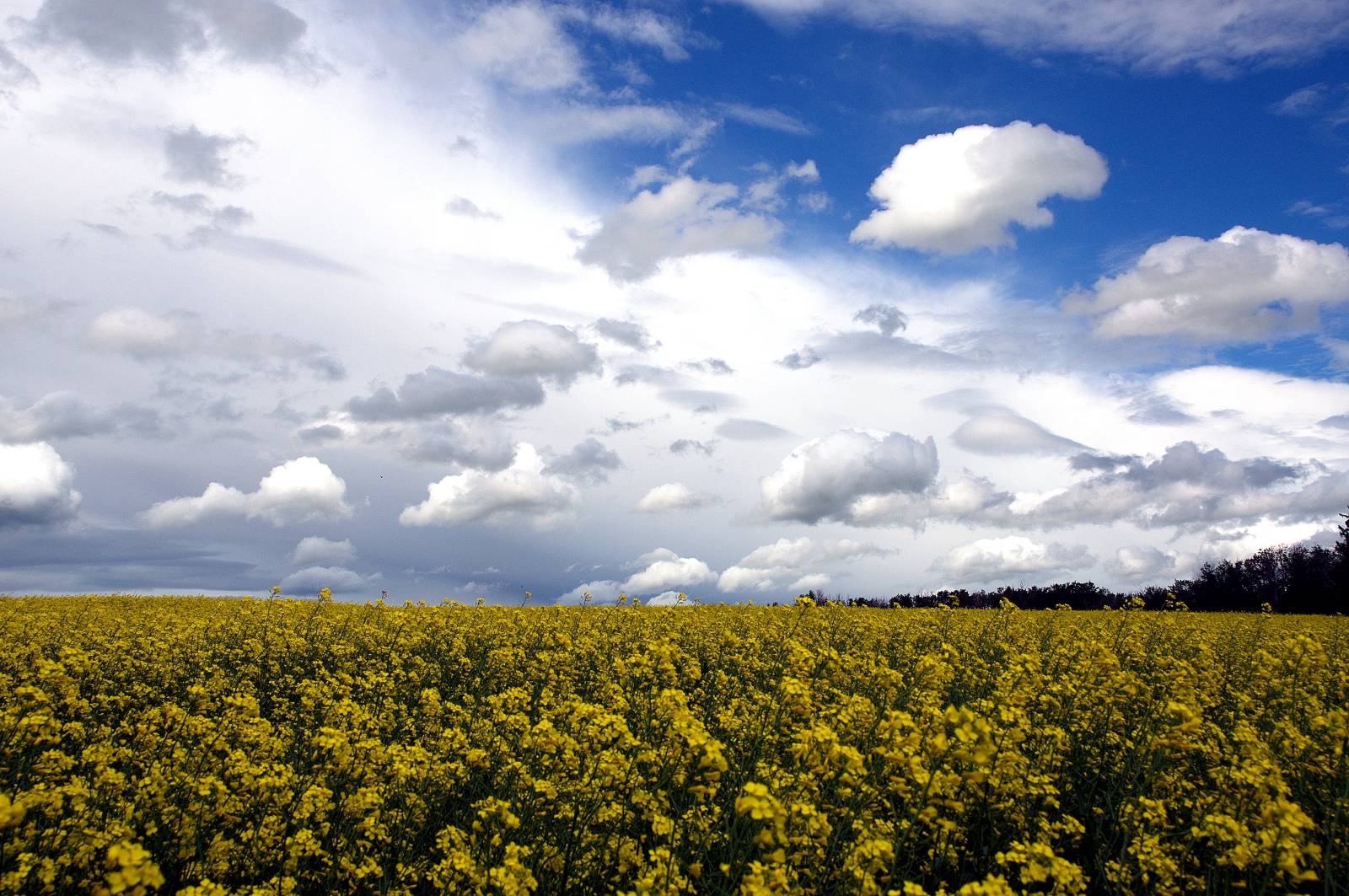

In the past, cattle, horses, and sheep were reared in the southern prairie region on ranches or smaller holdings. Currently Alberta produces cattle valued at over $3.3 billion, as well as other livestock in lesser quantities. In this region irrigation is widely used. Wheat, accounting for almost half of the $2 billion agricultural economy, is supplemented by canola, barley, rye, sugar beets, and other mixed farming. In 2011, Alberta producers seeded an estimated total of 17,900,000,000 acres (7.2 billion hectares; 28,000,000 square miles) to spring wheat, durum, barley, oats, mixed grains, triticale, canola and dry peas. Of the total seeded area, 94 per cent was harvested as grains and oilseeds and six per cent as greenfeed and silage. Saudi Arabia is a major export target especially for wheat and processed potato products. SA having decided to phase out their own forage and cereal production, Alberta expects this to be an opportunity to fill livestock feed demand in the kingdom.

Agriculture has a significant position in the province's economy. Over three million cattle are residents of the province at one time or another, and Albertan beef has a healthy worldwide market. Although beef could also be a major export to Saudi Arabia, as with wheat and potatoes above, market access is lacking at the moment. Nearly one half of all Canadian beef is produced in Alberta. Alberta is one of the prime producers of plains buffalo (bison) for the consumer market. Sheep for wool and lamb are also raised.

Wheat and canola are primary farm crops, with Alberta leading the provinces in spring wheat production, with other grains also prominent. Much of the farming is dryland farming, often with fallow seasons interspersed with cultivation. Continuous cropping (in which there is no fallow season) is gradually becoming a more common mode of production because of increased profits and a reduction of soil erosion. Across the province, the once common grain elevator is slowly being lost as rail lines are decreased and farmers now truck the grain to central points.

Clubroot (Plasmodiophora brassicae) is a costly disease of Brassicaceae here including canola. In several experiments by Peng et al., out of fungicides, biofungicides, inoculation with beneficial microbes, cultivar resistance, and crop rotation, only genetic resistance combined with more than two years rotation worked – susceptible cultivars rotated with other crops did not produce enough improvement.

Alberta is the leading beekeeping province of Canada, with some beekeepers wintering hives indoors in specially designed barns in southern Alberta, then migrating north during the summer into the Peace River valley where the season is short but the working days are long for honeybees to produce honey from clover and fireweed. Hybrid canola also requires bee pollination, and some beekeepers service this need.

==== Forestry ====
The vast northern forest reserves of softwood allow Alberta to produce large quantities of lumber, oriented strand board (OSB) and plywood, and several plants in northern Alberta supply North America and the Pacific Rim nations with bleached wood pulp and newsprint.

In 1999, lumber products from Alberta were valued at $4.1 billion of which 72% were exported around the world. Since forests cover approximately 59% of the province's land area, the government allows about 23.3 million cubic metres (820×10^{6} cu ft) to be harvested annually from the forests on public lands.

=== Services ===
Despite the high profile of the extractive industries, Alberta has a mature economy and most people work in services. In 2014 there were 1,635.8 thousand people employed in the services-producing sector. Since then, the number has steadily increased to 1754.8 thousand jobs by August 2019, which is an increase of 16.7 thousand jobs from August 2018 This includes wholesale and retail trade; transportation and warehousing; finance, insurance, real estate, rental and leasing; professional, scientific and technical services; business, building and other support services; educational services; health care and social assistance; information, culture and recreation; accommodation and food services; other services (except public administration) and public administration.

==== Finance ====
The TSX Venture Exchange is headquartered in Calgary. The city has the second highest number of corporate head offices in Canada after Toronto, and the financial services industry in Calgary has developed to support them. All major banks including the Big Five maintain corporate offices in Calgary, along with smaller banks such as Equitable Group. Recently there has also been a number of fintech companies founded in Calgary such as the National Digital Asset Exchange and Neo Financial, founded by the Skip-the-Dishes team.

One of Canada's largest accounting firms, MNP LLP, is also headquartered in Calgary.

Edmonton hosts the headquarters of the only major Canadian banks west of Toronto: Canadian Western Bank, and ATB Financial, as well as the only province-wide credit union, Servus Credit Union.

==== Government ====
Despite Alberta's reputation as a "small government" province, many health care and education professionals are lured to Alberta from other provinces by the higher wages the Alberta government is able to offer because of oil revenues. In 2014 the median household income in Alberta was $100,000 with the average weekly wage at $1,163—23 per cent higher than the Canadian national average.

In their May 2018 report co-authored by C. D. Howe Institute's President and CEO, William B.P. Robson, evaluating "the budgets, estimates and public accounts" of 2017/18 fiscal year that were tabled by senior governments in the Canadian provinces and the federal government in terms of reporting financial information, appropriately, with transparency, and in a timely fashion, Alberta and New Brunswick ranked highest. The report also said that, prior to 2016, Alberta had scored poorly in comparison with other provinces, because of "confusing array of "operating," "saving" and "capital" accounts that were not Public Sector Accounting Standards (PSAS) consistent." but since 2016, Alberta has received A-plus grades. The report said that Alberta and New Brunswick in FY2017 provided "straightforward reconciliations of results with budget intentions, their auditors record no reservations, and their budgets and public accounts are timely."

=== Technology ===
Alberta has a burgeoning high tech sector, including prominent technology companies iStockPhoto, Shareworks, Benevity, and Attabotics in Calgary, and Bioware and AltaML in Edmonton. Growth in Calgary's technology sector, particularly at Benevity, fueled predictions of a modest economic recovery in February 2020.

== See also ==
- Economy of Canada
- Energy policy of Canada
- Economy of Lethbridge
- Canadian Oil Patch, for the petroleum industry
- History of the petroleum industry in Canada
- Canada's Global Markets Action Plan
- Free trade agreements of Canada
