= Benevity =

Canadian technology company

Benevity, Inc.
- Company type: Privately held company
- Industry: Computer software, Cloud software, Software as a service
- Founded: 2008; 18 years ago
- Founder: Bryan de Lottinville
- Headquarters: Calgary, Alberta, Canada
- Area served: Worldwide
- Key people: Bryan de Lottinville (Executive Chairperson); Kelly Schmitt (CEO)
- Revenue: $100 million (2019)
- Owners: Hg, The Rise Fund, Generation Investment Management, JMI Equity, General Atlantic
- Number of employees: ~650 (2019)
- Website: benevity.com

Benevity is a Calgary-based company that provides charitable donation-management, volunteer-management and grant-management platforms. Benevity is one of Western Canada's largest startups. Its customers include Nike, Coca-Cola, Microsoft, Google, and Apple, and about 250 of the Fortune 1000 as of 2017.

The firm's products support companies in managing and tracking their employees' charitable giving, promoting charitable giving and volunteering, while reducing the costs of companies processing donations themselves.

== History ==
Benevity was founded in 2008 by Bryan de Lottinville, who previously worked as COO of iStockphoto (sold to Getty Images in 2006), with a team of four software developers. In 2010, it became one of only 15 certified B Corporations in Canada, and one of the first in Alberta, signifying its commitment to corporate social responsibility.

In 2016, Benevity was the third-fastest growing startup in Canada as ranked by Deloitte, with over 5,800% revenue growth. In 2017, Benevity ranked 10th with 5,411% revenue growth.

In October 2019, Benevity raised $40 million in Series C funding from existing investors JMI Equity and General Atlantic, which valued the company at near US$400 million market cap.

In December 2020, Benevity achieved unicorn status when Hg Capital purchased a majority stake in the company for US$1.1 billion.

== Headquarters ==
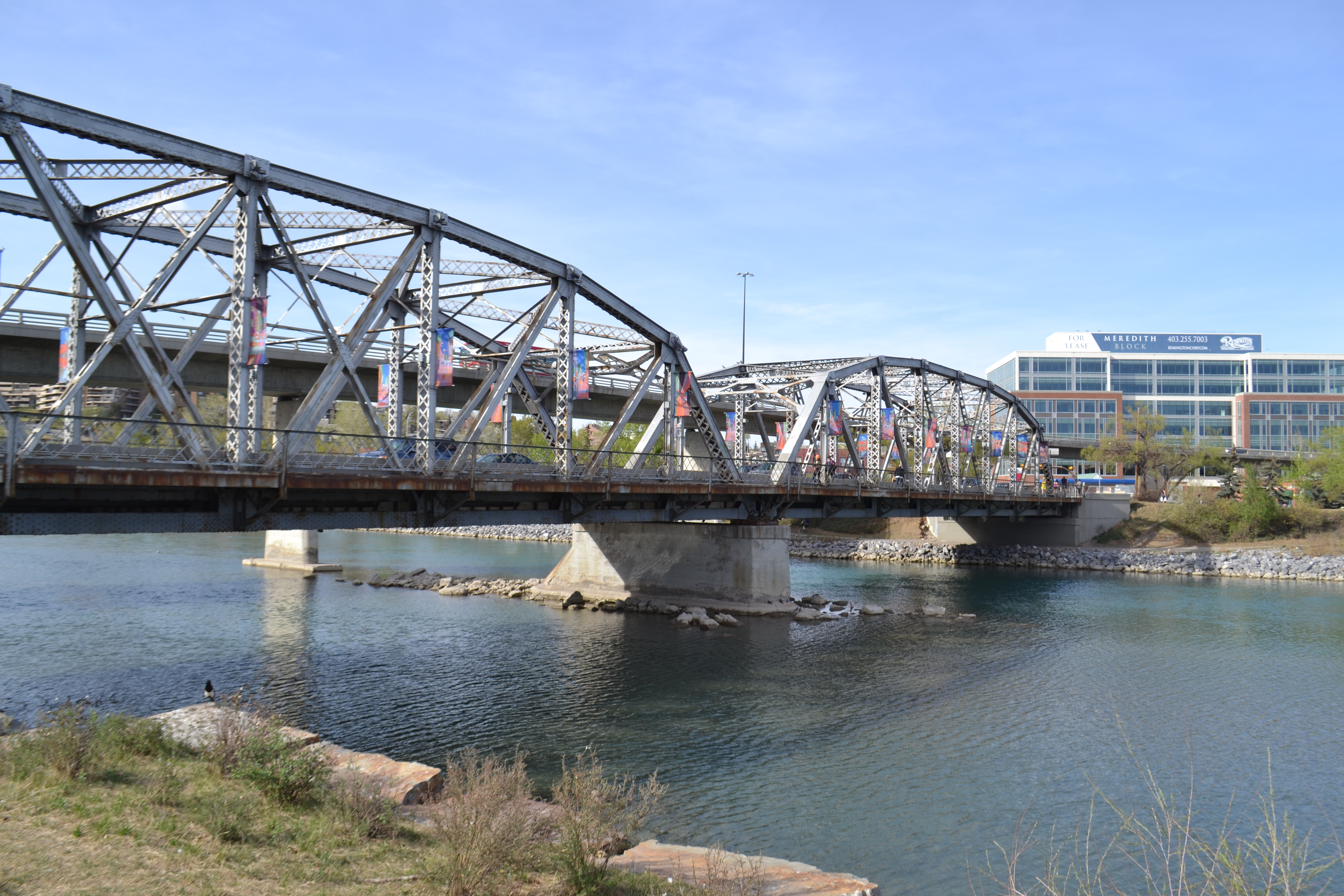
The Meredith Block (right) in 2016, prior to Benevity moving in

When Benevity was founded in 2008, the company was based in a small office above a shawarma shop. In 2017, Benevity moved into its fifth and largest headquarters, the Meredith Block office building in Bridgeland, adjacent to downtown Calgary.

As of 2025, Benevity also has offices in Toronto, Ontario; Geneva, Switzerland; and Barcelona, Spain.
