= HG Capital =

HG Capital may refer to:

- HGGC, a middle market private equity firm based in California and Utah
- H.I.G. Capital, a private equity firm based in Miami
- Hg (equity firm), a middle market technology private equity firm based in London and Munich
- Hg Capital Trust, a large investment fund managed by Hg
