= Marilyn Booker =

American lawyer and politician

- Education: Chicago-Kent College of Law
- Occupations: Lawyer; politician
- Years active: 1994–present

Marilyn Booker is an American lawyer and politician. She is best known for her role as the first global head of diversity for Morgan Stanley from 1994 to 2010. On June 16, 2020, she sued Morgan Stanley for racial discrimination and retaliation.

Booker is running for the Summerlin area Las Vegas City Council seat in Nevada.
