= Morgan Stanley =

American financial services company

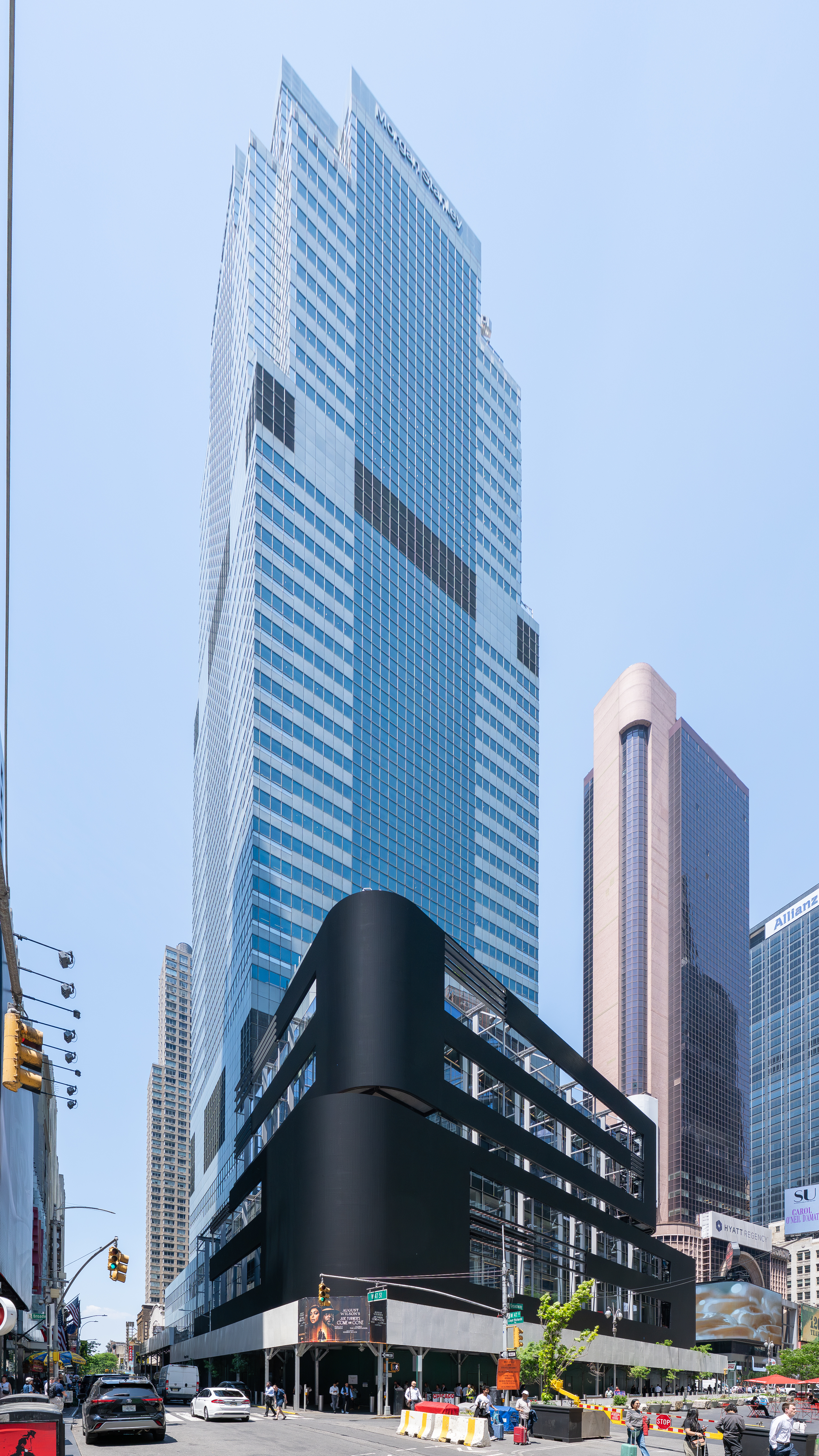
- Headquarters at 1585 Broadway
- Type: Public
- Traded as: NYSE: MS; S&P 100 component; S&P 500 component
- Industry: Financial services
- Founded: 1935; 91 years ago
- Founders: Henry Sturgis Morgan; Harold Stanley
- Headquarters: Morgan Stanley Building; New York City, U.S.
- Area served: International service
- Key people: James P. Gorman (chairman emeritus); Ted Pick (chairman and CEO); Andy Saperstein (co-president); Dan Simkowitz (co-president)
- Products: Asset management; Wealth management; Investment management; Investment banking; Sales and trading; Commodities; Prime brokerage
- Revenue: ▲US$70.6 billion (2025)
- Operating income: ▲US$22.0 billion (2025)
- Net income: ▲US$16.9 billion (2025)
- AUM: ▲US$1.90 trillion (2025)
- Total assets: ▲US$1.42 trillion (2025)
- Total equity: ▲US$112.7 billion (2025)
- Owner: Mitsubishi UFJ Financial Group (23.3%)
- Number of employees: 83,000 (2025)
- Subsidiaries: Morgan Stanley Wealth Management; E-Trade; Eaton Vance; Solium
- Capital ratio: 15% (2025)
- Website: morganstanley.com

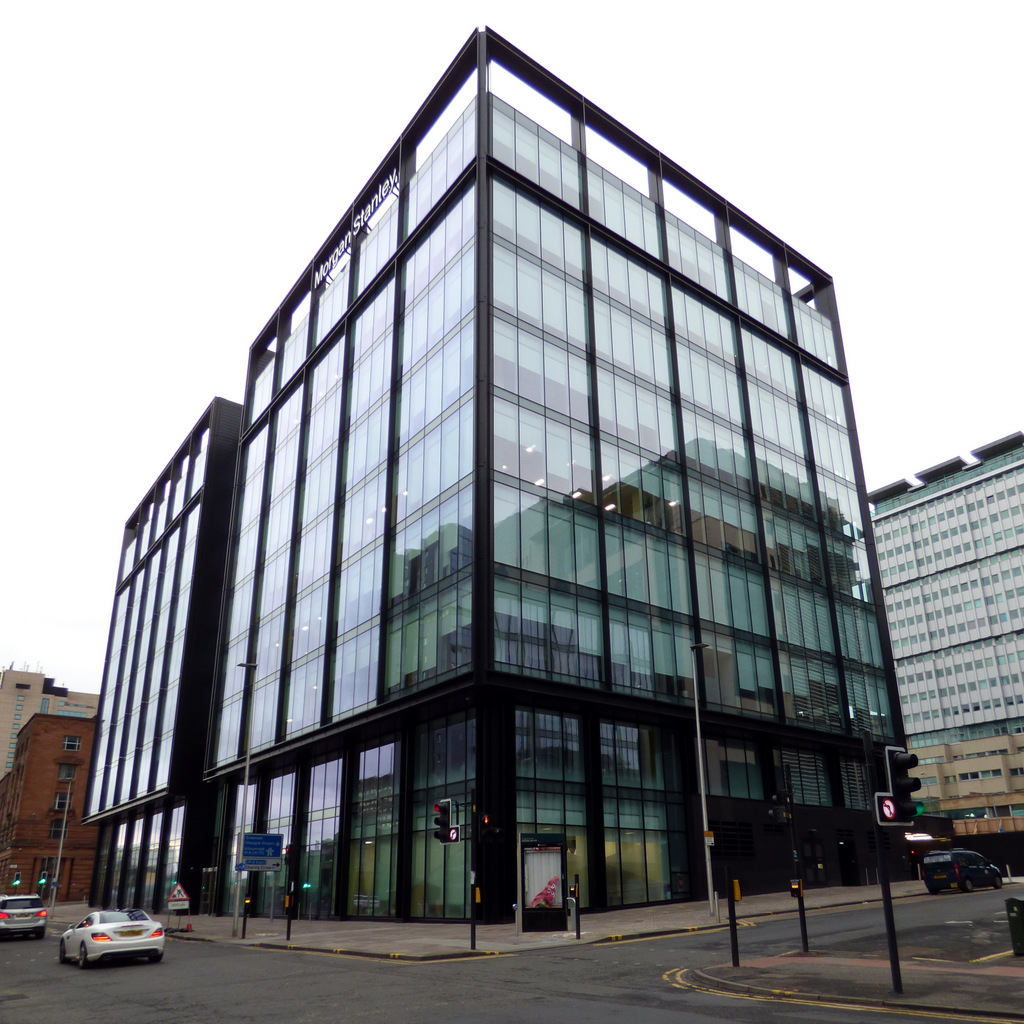
Offices of Morgan Stanley at the International Financial Services District in Glasgow, Scotland in 2018

Morgan Stanley is an American multinational banking institution headquartered in New York City. It is the sixth-largest bank in the United States and the world's eighth-largest bank by market capitalization as of 2026. Based on 1585 Broadway in Midtown Manhattan, the bank maintains offices in 42 countries worldwide. It is considered a systemically important financial institution by the Financial Stability Board.

Founded in 1935, by employees of J.P. Morgan & Co., including Henry Sturgis Morgan (a grandson of J.P. Morgan), Harold Stanley, in response to the Glass–Steagall Act, which required the splitting of American commercial and investment banking businesses. In 1997, the company merged with Dean Witter Discover & Co. before returning to Morgan Stanley branding in 2001.

The company operates three divisions: institutional services, wealth management, and investment management. It is a major provider of investment banking services, through corporate advisory, mergers and acquisitions, sales and trading, and public offerings. Its wealth management franchise and asset management division are among the world's largest in terms of total assets. Its retail brokerage offering is provided via E-Trade. Morgan Stanley operates one of the largest investment banks by revenue. It is ranked 39th on the Fortune 500 and 21st on the Forbes Global 2000.

== History ==
=== Early years (1935–1997) ===
Morgan Stanley traces its roots to J.P. Morgan & Co. After the U.S. Congress passed the Glass–Steagall Act in 1933, it was no longer possible for a corporation to have investment banking and commercial banking businesses under a single holding entity. J.P. Morgan & Co. chose the commercial banking business over the investment banking business. As a result, some of the employees of J.P. Morgan & Co., most notably Henry S. Morgan (grandson of J. P. Morgan) and Harold Stanley, left J.P. Morgan & Co. and joined others from the Drexel partners to form Morgan Stanley. The firm formally opened its doors for business on September 16, 1935, at 2 Wall Street, New York City, just down the street from J.P. Morgan.

In its first year, the company operated with a 24% market share (US$1.1 billion) in public offerings and private placements.

The firm was involved with the distribution of 1938 US$100 million of debentures for the United States Steel Corporation as the lead underwriter. The firm also obtained the distinction of being the lead syndicate in the 1939 U.S. rail financing. On November 28, 1941, the firm reorganized as a partnership to meet the membership criteria of the New York Stock Exchange, as it moved into the brokerage business.

From 1951 until 1961 the firm was led by Perry Hall, the last founder to lead Morgan Stanley. During this period, the firm co-managed the World Bank's triple-A-rated bonds offering of 1952, as well as introducing General Motors' US$300 million debt issue, US$231 million IBM stock offering, and the US$250 million AT&T's debt offering.

Morgan Stanley credits itself with having created the first viable computer model for financial analysis in 1962, thereby starting a new trend in the field of financial analysis. Future president and chairman Dick Fisher contributed to the computer model as a young employee, learning the Fortran and COBOL programming languages at IBM. In 1967, it established the Morgan & Cie, International in Paris in an attempt to enter the European securities market. The firm acquired Brooks, Harvey & Co., Inc. in 1967 and established a presence in the real estate business. The sales and trading business is said to be the brainchild of Bob Baldwin.

In 1996, Morgan Stanley acquired Van Kampen American Capital.

=== After the merger (since 1997) ===
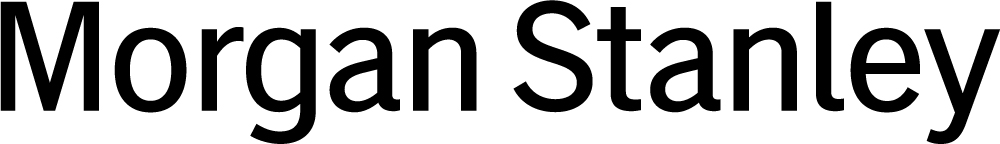
Current Morgan Stanley Logo 2022

Historical logo used by Morgan Stanley in the early 2000s

In February 1997, the company merged with Dean Witter Discover & Co., the spun-off financial services business of Sears Roebuck. Dean Witter's chairman and CEO, Philip J. Purcell, continued to hold the same roles in the newly merged "Morgan Stanley Dean Witter Discover & Co." Morgan Stanley's president John J. Mack became the firm's president and chief operating officer. In 1998, the name of the firm was changed to "Morgan Stanley Dean Witter & Co." Originally, the name was chosen to be the combination of the two predecessor companies to avoid tension between the two firms. Eventually, in 2001 "Dean Witter" was further dropped and the name became "Morgan Stanley". The merged firm began expanding overseas operations: in 1999, Mack set up a joint venture in India with local partner JM Financial.

Morgan Stanley was the largest tenant of the World Trade Center, occupying 21 floors of the South Tower; its 3,700 employees there and in 5 World Trade Center had been drilled in emergency evacuation. Most of these offices had been inherited from Dean Witter which had occupied the space since the mid-1980s. The firm lost 13 employees during the September 11 attacks in 2001 (Thomas F. Swift, Wesley Mercer, Jennifer de Jesus, Joseph DiPilato, Nolbert Salomon, Godwin Forde, Steve R. Strauss, Lindsay C. Herkness, Albert Joseph, Jorge Velazquez, Titus Davidson, Charles Laurencin and Security Director Rick Rescorla) in the towers, while 2,687 were successfully evacuated by Rick Rescorla. The surviving employees moved to temporary headquarters in the vicinity. In 2005 Morgan Stanley moved 2,300 of its employees back to lower Manhattan, at that time the largest such move.

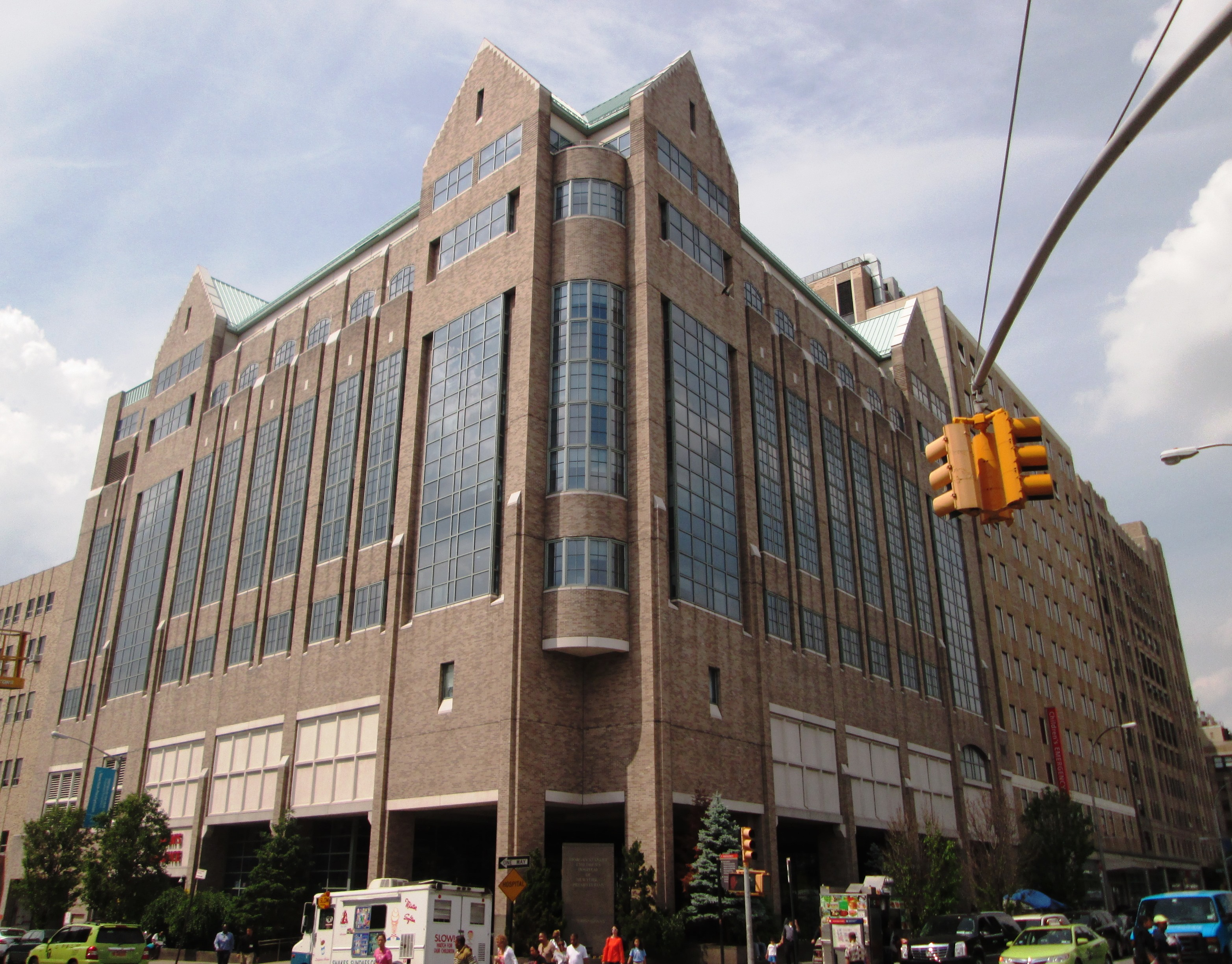
Morgan Stanley Children's Hospital of New York-Presbyterian is the only stand-alone pediatric hospital in New York City and is part of New York-Presbyterian Hospital.

In 2003, NewYork-Presbyterian Hospital named the Morgan Stanley Children's Hospital in recognition of the firm's sponsorship of the hospital, which largely funded its construction through philanthropy. The initiative began under CEO Philip J. Purcell and was completed under John Mack. Employees at the firm have been involved with the hospital since the 1990s and personally donated to the construction of the current child-friendly building, which opened in November 2003.

In March 2005, a management crisis resulted in an exodus of key employees. Purcell resigned as CEO of Morgan Stanley in June 2005 when a highly public campaign by former Morgan Stanley partners threatened to damage the firm and challenged his refusal to aggressively increase leverage, increase risk, enter the sub-prime mortgage business and make expensive acquisitions; the same strategies that forced Morgan Stanley into massive write-downs, related to the subprime mortgage crisis, by 2007.

In December 2006, Morgan Stanley announced the spin-off of its Discover Card unit. The bank completed the spinoff of Discover Financial on June 30, 2007.

In February 2007, Morgan Stanley announced the end of its Indian joint venture: the bank acquired its local partner's stake in the institutional brokerage business, and sold its own stake in the other businesses. The bank then set up a wholly owned subsidiary; the country head of Investment Management, Narayan Ramachandran, became CEO of the new subsidiary. Aisha de Sequeira, a managing director in the Mergers and Acquisitions group, was made Head of Investment Banking.

In December 2007, due to losses during the subprime mortgage crisis, Morgan Stanley received a US$5 billion capital infusion from the China Investment Corporation in exchange for securities convertible to 9.9% of its shares in 2010.

The bank's Process Driven Trading unit was among several on Wall Street caught in a short squeeze, reportedly losing nearly $300 million in one day. The bubble's subsequent collapse was considered to be a central component of the 2008 financial crisis.

The bank was contracted by the United States Treasury in August 2008 to advise the government on potential rescue strategies for Fannie Mae and Freddie Mac. Within days, Morgan Stanley itself was at risk of failure, with rapidly changing prospects, regulatory model and ownership stakes over the course of four weeks from mid-September to mid-October 2008.

The bank Morgan Stanley was reported to have lost over 80% of its market value during the 2008 financial crisis. On September 17, 2008, the British evening-news analysis program Newsnight reported that Morgan Stanley was facing difficulties after a 42% slide in its share price in two days. CEO John J. Mack wrote in a memo to staff "we're in the midst of a market controlled by fear and rumours and short-sellers are driving our stock down." By September 19, 2008, the share price had slid 57% in four days, and the company was said to have explored merger possibilities with CITIC, Wachovia, HSBC, Standard Chartered, Banco Santander and Nomura. At one point, Hank Paulson offered Morgan Stanley to JPMorgan Chase at no cost, but JPMorgan's Jamie Dimon refused the offer.

Morgan Stanley and Goldman Sachs, the last two major investment banks in the US, both announced on September 22, 2008, that they would become traditional bank holding companies regulated by the Federal Reserve. The Federal Reserve's approval of their bid to become banks ended the ascendancy of securities firms, 75 years after Congress separated them from deposit-taking lenders, and capped weeks of chaos that sent Lehman Brothers into bankruptcy and led to the rushed sale of Merrill to Bank of America.

MUFG Bank, Japan's largest bank, invested $9 billion in a direct purchase of a 21% ownership stake in Morgan Stanley on September 29, 2008. The payment from MUFG was supposed to be wired electronically; however, because it needed to be made on an emergency basis on Columbus Day when banks were closed in the US, MUFG cut a US$9 billion physical check, the largest amount written via physical check at the time. The physical check was accepted by Robert A. Kindler, Global Head of Mergers and Acquisitions and Vice Chairman of Morgan Stanley, at the offices of Wachtell Lipton. Concerns over the completion of the Mitsubishi deal during the October 2008 stock market volatility caused a dramatic fall in Morgan Stanley's stock price to levels last seen in 1994. It recovered once Mitsubishi UFJ's 21% stake in Morgan Stanley was completed on October 14, 2008.

Morgan Stanley borrowed $107.3 billion from the Fed during the 2008 crisis, the most of any bank, according to data compiled by Bloomberg News Service and published August 22, 2011.

In January 2009, the Global Wealth Management Group was merged with Citi's Smith Barney to form Morgan Stanley Smith Barney. Morgan Stanley owned 51% of the entity, and Citi held 49%. In May 2012, Morgan Stanley exercised its option to purchase an additional 14% of the joint venture from Citi. The division was renamed Morgan Stanley Wealth Management.

In October 2009, Morgan Stanley announced that it would sell Van Kampen to Invesco for $1.5 billion (~$2.18 billion in 2025), but would retain the Morgan Stanley brand. It provides asset management products and services to institutional investors worldwide, including pension plans, corporations, private funds, non-profit organizations, foundations, endowments, governmental agencies, insurance companies and banks.

In September 2013, Morgan Stanley announced a partnership with Longchamp Asset Management, a French-based asset manager that specializes in the distribution of UCITS hedge funds, and La Française AM, a multi-specialist asset manager with a 10-year track record in alternative investments.

In November 2013, Morgan Stanley announced that it would invest $1 billion (~$1.36 billion in 2025) to help improve affordable housing as part of a wider push to encourage investment in efforts that aid economic, social and environmental sustainability.

In July 2014, Morgan Stanley's Asian private equity arm announced it had raised around $1.7 billion (~$2.27 billion in 2025) for its fourth fund in the area.

In December 2015, Morgan Stanley announced layoffs of 25% of its fixed income jobs.

In March 2018, Morgan Stanley acquired Mesa West, a leading U.S. commercial real estate credit platform, adding to its existing investment strategies and product offerings across real assets and private credit.

In February 2019, the company announced the acquisition of Solium Capital, a manager of employee stock plans, for $900 million (~$1.12 billion in 2025).

In October 2020, the company completed its acquisition of E-Trade for $13 billion in stock, the biggest acquisition by a U.S. bank since the 2008 financial crisis.

In March 2021, Morgan Stanley acquired Eaton Vance. With the addition of Eaton Vance, Morgan Stanley now had $5.4 trillion of client assets across its Wealth Management and Investment Management segments.

The firm conducted layoffs in December 2022, and Bloomberg announced the firm expected more layoffs in mid-2023.

In May 2023, Morgan Stanley outlined its intention to reduce approximately 3,000 positions, 5% of its workforce, with financial advisors and support staff exempted from these staff cuts.

In October 2024, Morgan Stanley entered into a 40,000-tonne carbon dioxide removal purchase agreement with Climeworks, a direct air capture startup company, for an undisclosed price. The same year, Guy Metcalfe who led Morgan Stanley's real estate investment banking business for nearly two decades, retired as global chairman of real estate.

In January 2025, Morgan Stanley announced that it had decided to leave the Net-Zero Banking Alliance. Although this decision was made, Morgan Stanley remains vigilant in its commitment towards helping the world transition to net-zero carbon emissions.

In October 2025, Morgan Stanley agreed to acquire EquityZen, which operates a trading platform for buying and selling stakes in private companies.

In March 2026, the company laid off 2,500 people, or 3% of its staff.

== Awards and honors ==
- In 2020, Morgan Stanley was named IFR's Bank of the Year, and in 2021 Morgan Stanley was named Euromoney's best investment bank in the world.
- Fast Company named Morgan Stanley in its list of Best Workplaces for Innovators in 2020 and 2021.
- Great Place to Work Institute Japan in 2007 ranked Morgan Stanley as the second best corporation to work in Japan, based on the opinions of the employees and the corporate culture.
- The Times listed Morgan Stanley 5th in its 20 Best Big Companies to Work For 2006.
- Morgan Stanley was named one of the 100 Best Companies for Working Mothers in 2004 by Working Mother.
- Family Digest named Morgan Stanley one of the "Best Companies for African Americans" in June 2004.

== Legal and regulatory issues ==
=== 2000s ===
In 2003, Morgan Stanley agreed to pay $125 million to settle its portion of a $1.4 billion settlement of a suit brought by Eliot Spitzer, the Attorney General of New York, the National Association of Securities Dealers (NASD, now known as the Financial Industry Regulatory Authority (FINRA)), the United States Securities and Exchange Commission (SEC), and a number of state securities regulators, relating to intentionally misleading research motivated by a desire to win investment banking business with the companies covered.

In 2004, Morgan Stanley settled a sex discrimination suit brought by the Equal Employment Opportunity Commission for $54 million (~$88.1 million in 2025). In 2007, the firm agreed to pay $46 million (~$68.7 million in 2025) to settle a class action lawsuit brought by eight female brokers.

In July 2004, the firm paid NASD a $2.2 million (~$3.59 million in 2025) fine for more than 1,800 late disclosures of reportable information about its brokers.

In September 2004, the firm paid a $19 million (~$31 million in 2025) fine imposed by NYSE for failure to deliver prospectuses to customers in registered offerings, inaccurate reporting of certain program trading information, short sale violations, failures to fingerprint new employees and failure to timely file exchange forms.

The New York Stock Exchange imposed a $19 million (~$30.1 million in 2025) fine on January 12, 2005, for alleged regulatory and supervisory lapses. At the time, it was the largest fine ever imposed by the NYSE.

In May 2005, a Florida jury found that Morgan Stanley failed to give adequate information to Ronald Perelman about Sunbeam thereby defrauding him and causing damages to him of $604 million (~$955 million in 2025). In addition, punitive damages were added for total damages of $1.450 billion. This verdict was directed by the judge as a sanction against Morgan Stanley after the firm's attorneys infuriated the court by failing and refusing to produce documents, and falsely telling the court that certain documents did not exist. The ruling was overturned on March 21, 2007, and Morgan Stanley was no longer required to pay the $1.57 billion (~$2.35 billion in 2025) verdict.

Morgan Stanley settled a class-action lawsuit on March 2, 2006. It had been filed in California by both current and former Morgan Stanley employees for unfair labor practices instituted to those in the financial advisor training program. Employees of the program had claimed the firm expected trainees to clock overtime hours without additional pay and handle various administrative expenses as a result of their expected duties. A $42.5 million settlement was reached and Morgan Stanley admitted no fault.

In May the firm agreed to pay a $15 million fine. The Securities and Exchange Commission accused the firm of deleting emails and failing to cooperate with SEC investigators.

FINRA announced a $12.5 million (~$18.7 million in 2025) settlement with Morgan Stanley on September 27, 2007. This resolved charges that the firm's former affiliate, Morgan Stanley DW, Inc. (MSDW), failed on numerous occasions to provide emails to claimants in arbitration proceedings as well as to regulators. The company had claimed that the destruction of the firm's email servers in the September 11 attacks in 2001, terrorist attacks on New York's World Trade Center resulted in the loss of all emails before that date. In fact, the firm had millions of earlier emails that had been retrieved from backup copies stored in another location that was not destroyed in the attacks. Customers who had lost their arbitration cases against Morgan Stanley DW Inc. because of their inability to obtain these emails to demonstrate Morgan Stanley's misconduct received a token amount of money as a result of the settlement.

In July 2007, Morgan Stanley agreed to pay $4.4 million (~$6.57 million in 2025) to settle a class-action lawsuit. The firm was accused of incorrectly charging clients for storage of precious metals.

Under a settlement with New York Attorney General Andrew M. Cuomo, the firm agreed to repurchase approximately $4.5 billion worth of auction rate securities. The firm was accused of misrepresenting auction rate securities in its sales and marketing.

In March 2009, Morgan Stanley paid $7.2 million to settle charges by FINRA of misconduct in the handling of the accounts of 90 Rochester, New York-area retirees.

The Financial Services Authority fined the firm £1.4 million for failing to use controls properly relating to the actions of a rogue trader on one of its trading desks. This resulted in a $120 million loss for the firm.

=== 2010s ===
In April 2010, the Commodity Futures Trading Commission announced the firm agreed to pay $14 million related to an attempt to hide prohibited trading activity in oil futures.

Garth R. Peterson, one of Morgan Stanley's highest-ranking real estate executives in China, pleaded guilty on April 25, 2012, to violating U.S. federal anti-corruption laws. He was charged with secretly acquiring millions of dollars' worth of property investments for himself and a Chinese government official. The official steered business to Morgan Stanley.

In June 2012, Morgan Stanley was fined $5 million by the Commodity Futures Trading Commission and an additional $1.75 million to CME and the Chicago Board of Trade. Morgan Stanley employees improperly executed fictitious sales in Eurodollar and Treasury Note futures contracts.

In August 2012, Morgan Stanley paid $4.8 million in fines to settle a price-fixing scandal, which had been estimated to have cost New Yorkers $300 million to date.

In Morgan Stanley v. Skowron, 989 F. Supp. 2d 356 (S.D.N.Y. 2013), applying New York's faithless servant doctrine to a case involving Morgan Stanley's hedge fund subsidiary, United States District Judge Shira Scheindlin held that a hedge fund's employee engaging in insider trading in violation of his company's code of conduct, which also required him to report his misconduct, must repay his employer the full $31 million (~$42.2 million in 2025) his employer paid him as compensation during his period of faithlessness. Judge Scheindlin called the insider trading the "ultimate abuse of a portfolio manager's position". The judge also wrote:"In addition to exposing Morgan Stanley to government investigations and direct financial losses, Skowron's behavior damaged the firm's reputation, a valuable corporate asset."

In February 2014, Morgan Stanley agreed to pay $1.25 billion, $625 million each to Fannie Mae and Freddie Mac, as a penalty for concealing the full risk associated with mortgage securities with the Federal Housing Finance Agency.

In September 2014, Morgan Stanley agreed to pay $95 million to resolve a lawsuit by the Public Employees' Retirement System of Mississippi (MissPERS) and the West Virginia Investment Management Board. Morgan Stanley was accused of misleading investors in mortgage-backed securities.

In May 2015, Morgan Stanley was fined $2 million for short interest reporting and rule violations for more than six years, by FINRA.

In February 2016, Morgan Stanley paid $3.2 billion to settle with state and federal authorities over Morgan Stanley's creation of mortgage-backed bonds before the 2008 financial crisis.

In August 2016, Morgan Stanley Hong Kong Securities Ltd. was fined HK$18.5 million ($2.4 million) by Hong Kong's securities regulator, Securities and Futures Commission, for violations of Hong Kong's Code of Conduct. Included was Morgan Stanley's failure to avoid a conflict of interest between principal and agency trading.

In December 2016, another unit of Morgan Stanley paid $7.5 million to settle customer protection rule violations.

In January 2017, the corporation was fined $13 million due to overbilling and violating investor asset safeguarding custody rules. Morgan Stanley agreed to pay the fine without commenting on the charges.

Douglas E. Greenberg, a broker, was fired in 2018 after it was reported that four women from Lake Oswego, Oregon, had sought police protection against him over a 15-year period on allegations of harassment, threats, and assault. According to the report, Morgan Stanley executives were aware of the allegations, and knew of at least two arrests and a federal subpoena against him, but did not take any action. The story was called a #MeToo moment for Portland's financial service industry. He managed tens of millions of dollars and had made the 2018 Forbes list for top wealth advisors in Oregon.

In December 2018, FINRA announced a $10 million fine against Morgan Stanley for failures in its anti-money laundering compliance. Morgan Stanley violated the Bank Secrecy Act over a period of five years.

In April 2019, Morgan Stanley agreed to pay $150 million to settle charges that it had misled two large California public pension funds about the risks of mortgage-backed securities. California Attorney General Xavier Becerra commented: "Morgan Stanley lied about the risk of its products and put profits over teachers and public employees who relied on its advice." Morgan Stanley denied wrongdoing.

In November 2019, Morgan Stanley dismissed or placed on leave four traders for suspected securities mismarking. The firm suspected that $100–140 million in losses were concealed by the mismarking of the value of the securities.

In November 2019, Morgan Stanley paid a $1.5 million fine to settle claims by the United States Securities and Exchange Commission that it put client money into more expensive mutual fund share classes when cheaper options were available despite representations to clients that it used tools to find the least costly option.

=== 2020s ===
In May 2020, Morgan Stanley agreed to pay a $5 million penalty to settle allegations made by the SEC that the corporation provided misleading information to some clients in the retail wrap fee programs regarding trade-execution services and transaction costs.

In June 2020, Morgan Stanley was sued by their former head of diversity Marilyn Booker for discrimination. She alleged that she was fired for pushing for the restructure of the company's training program for black financial advisers. She claimed this would help more recruits to succeed in a bid to rectify her perceived diversity problem that too few of the company's employees were black. Her lawsuit also claimed that black employees experienced discrimination such as disparate treatment at work as well as retaliation and unequal pay. In May 2021, both parties filed a joint stipulation to dismiss the case with prejudice in the U.S. District Court for the Eastern District of New York.

In September 2022, the United States Securities and Exchange Commission announced charges against Morgan Stanley stemming from the firm's extensive failures, over a five-year period, to protect the personal identifying information of approximately 15 million customers. Morgan Stanley agreed to pay a $35 million penalty to settle the SEC charges.

In November 2023, Attorney General of Connecticut William Tong announced a $6.5 million settlement with Morgan Stanley for compromising the personal information of its customers due to negligent security practices.

In January 2024, Morgan Stanley agreed to pay $249 million to settle a criminal investigation and a related Securities and Exchange Commission probe related to the unauthorized disclosure of block trades to investors, by the bank's supervisor for such trades and another employee.

In February 2024, the company was fined $1.4 million by the Financial Industry Regulatory Authority for repeated failures to timely close out failed inter-dealer municipal securities transactions.

In February 2025, a group of 17 U.S. state attorneys general criticized Morgan Stanley for making improper or inadequate disclosures about investments in China. The lawmakers cited that the firm, along with several other top U.S. asset managers, were downplaying risks associated with China given its status as "designated foreign adversary" and its intention to invade Taiwan.

In 2025, The Dutch Public Prosecutor's Office imposed fines totalling €101 million on two Morgan Stanley (MS) companies in London and Amsterdam for dividend withholding tax (dividend tax) evasion.

== See also ==
- Dean Witter Reynolds
- Discover Card
- MSCI
- Van Kampen Funds
- Metalmark Capital, formerly Morgan Stanley Capital Partners
- Morgan Stanley Smith Barney, a joint venture with Citigroup
