= Grant management software =

Grant management software is a program or application that helps non-profits administer the grant process. Some software is designed to help foundations (known as "grantmakers") to organize, prioritize, and process the grant applications they receive from charities (known as "grantseekers"), as well as simplify oversight of the grants they make. Other software is designed to be used by grantseekers to help them organize and write their grant applications. Both types of software, as well as combined solutions serving both sets of users, are available as self-hosted programs or web-based cloud applications.

The software functions for grantseekers can include grant discovery, budget planning, peer collaboration, regulatory compliance, proposal submission, administrative reporting and project tracking. Software functions for grantmakers can include receipt, organization, and prioritization of grant applications, fund disbursement tracking, grant recipient collaboration, and impact-of-funds analysis. In both cases, the software helps grant managers, principal investigators, researchers and other individuals ease grant-related administrative burdens.

== Grant management software roles ==
A grant manager (or grant administrator) can be responsible for grant writing. regulatory compliance, identifying and managing grant project teams. Grant management software automates functions such as opportunity discovery, peer collaboration and workflow tracking. Additionally grants management software can streamline granting activities relating to confirming the tax-exempt status of a not-for-profit as well as cross checking applicants against various terrorist watch lists such as OFAC.

Other software roles include applicants (both individuals and organizations), researchers, reviewers and any other party that may need to be involved in the grant making processes.

== Software functions ==
The pre-award grant process encompasses everything done before a grant is awarded, such as searching for specific grant types open for application, writing and submitting the grant application, and receiving the rejection or denial letter from the potential grantor. The post-award process encompasses tasks after an award is won, such as purchasing research equipment, tracking and certifying research efforts, accounting tasks, and reporting to the grantor or grantors.

Some software variants provide features for the entire lifecycle of a grant. Other solutions offer comprehensive and targeted services for the pre-award process. Others focus on the grant discovery part of the pre-award process, yet others offer some post-award services.

More comprehensive solutions offer functionality that addresses all of the above aspects.

Most grant management solutions are available as a hosted service. Under this model, customers pay vendors for online access to the software. Commonly called SaaS (software as a service) or a cloud service, hosted software is available as an application that is run at vendors’ own facilities. One of the benefits of hosted software is that customers often need little or no internal IT support. Despite some concern over security, hosted services are usually more secure than nonprofits’ own IT systems.

== Grant management software market ==
Many nonprofits, schools and universities rely on grant funding. Each year, all U.S. grant sources give an estimated $1 trillion in grant money. The federal government alone spent $489 billion in grant funding in fiscal 2006. there is often confusion regarding the term Grant management in that many Grant managers control the disbursement of grant funds while other grant managers control the usage of received grant funds. this is an important distinction when deciding on the correct software for your organisation.

Grant management software companies operate in the information-management market.

== Grant discovery ==
Grant management software can help customers find grants by automatically searching known funding sources and alerting users when applicable grant opportunities are available. One site that grant discovery solutions can search is Grants.gov, which lists opportunities from 26 federal grant-making organizations. Other funding sources that can be included are foundations. There are hundreds of foundations in the United States, the top three being the Bill & Melinda Gates Foundation, Ford Foundation and J. Paul Getty Trust, which have combined assets of $54.1 billion. In addition, some discovery solutions search for grants that are offered at the state level.

== Grant collaboration ==
Preparing for award submissions, finding funding opportunities, and managing grant projects takes considerable collaboration. Some grant management software offer collaboration solutions to make this process easier. Collaboration solutions can help users review grant opportunities, vote on opportunities to apply for, and communicate with other project peers.

A select few software vendors deploy social-media applications to simplify collaboration, which help limit the sometimes cumbersome serial communications process of emails. Increasingly, researchers and others involved in the grant process are adept in modern technologies such as social media.

== Grant tracking and reporting ==
Organizations that receive funding often have to track grant-related activity and report results to grantors. These tasks can include creating and maintaining award documentation, preparing budgets, and ensuring fund use is within grantor compliance. The software can record who participates and manage grant-related documents such as letter templates as well as export data to programs such as Excel for easier reporting.

In addition to reporting for internal purposes, organizations such as the Foundation Center allow grant makers to export their reports in order to provide analysis on grant making activity on both a micro and macro level

== Grant management software tools ==
Grant management software tools are designed to facilitate grants management according to best practices, ensuring transparency in managing government-funded programs. At present, these tools face challenges in presenting detailed and strategic views of performance indicators associated with the objectives of each grant funder.
