= McNeill HVDC Back-to-back station =

Substation

McNeill back to back HVDC converter station
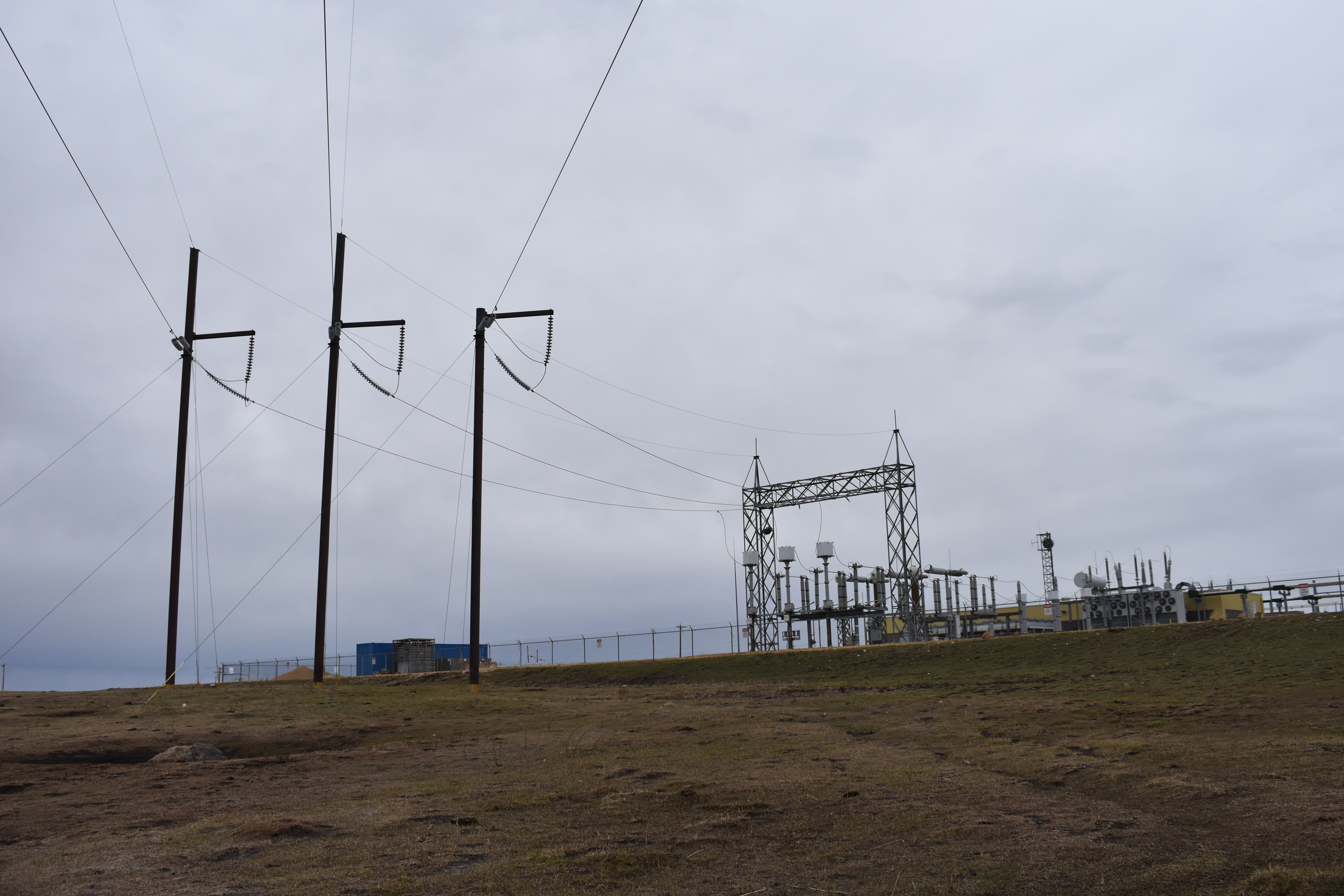

Location
- Country: Canada
- State: Alberta
- Coordinates: 50°35′56″N 110°01′25″W
- From: Alberta
- To: Saskatchewan

Ownership information
- Owner: ATCO Electric
- Operator: ATCO Electric

Construction information
- Substation installer: GEC-Alstom
- Commissioned: 1989

Technical information
- Type: Back to Back
- Current type: HVDC
- Total length: 0 km (0 mi)
- Capacity: 150 MW
- DC voltage: 42 kV
- No. of poles: 1

McNeill HVDC Back-to-back station is an HVDC back-to-back station at 50°35'56"N 110°1'25"W, which interconnects the power grids of the Canadian provinces Alberta and Saskatchewan and went in service in 1989. McNeill HVDC back-to-back station is the most northerly of a series of HVDC interconnectors between the unsynchronised eastern and western AC systems of the United States and Canada. The station, which was built by GEC-Alstom, can transfer a maximum power of 150 MW at a DC voltage of 42 kV. The station is unusual in many respects and contained several firsts for HVDC.

Most notably, the McNeill station was the first HVDC installation to dispense with the DC smoothing reactor, a component which most engineers consider as an absolute must at HVDC plants. Even today, only a small number of back to back HVDC stations (and no point-to-point transmission schemes) have been built without DC smoothing reactors.

The McNeill station was also notable for operating with an exceptionally low Short Circuit Ratio (SCR). The SCR is a measure of how strong or weak the connected AC system is. Most HVDC schemes using line-commutated converters operate with a SCR of at least 3, but the McNeill scheme was designed to operate with an Effective Short Circuit Ratio (ESCR – a measure which subtracts the harmonic filters from the evaluation of SCR and is more meaningful on very weak AC systems) of less than 1.0 on the Saskatchewan side. This is one of the lowest ESCR values ever achieved with a line-commutated HVDC converter.

McNeill was also the first HVDC station to use three-phase, four-winding converter transformers. The transformers, which are connected to 138 kV on the Alberta side and 230 kV on the Saskatchewan side, are each equipped with a 25 kV tertiary winding (to which the harmonic filters are connected) in addition to the two valve windings. This arrangement allowed the harmonic filters to be switched by vacuum switchgear which is more tolerant of large numbers of operations than high-voltage switchgear connected directly to the 138 kV or 230 kV busbars. This was a significant advantage since the extremely low short circuit ratio required the reactive power to be controlled within very tight limits, leading to frequent switching operations.

The 12 thyristor valves at each side are arranged in a conventional twelve-pulse bridge. The valves are cooled by a mixture of de-ionised water and ethylene glycol, which does not freeze at a temperature of -50 °C. These were the first thyristor valves ever to use water/glycol mixtures directly inside the valve, with no separate secondary cooling circuit. The valves use 100mm, 5.2 kV electrically triggered thyristors with 11 in series per valve on the Alberta side and 12 in series per valve on the Saskatchewan side.

In January 2012, Alstom was awarded a contract to replace the analogue control system by a more modern digital control system.
