= Solium =

Software company in Canada

- Company type: Private
- Traded as: TSX: SUM - Former Symbol
- Industry: Financial services, Software
- Founded: 1999; 26 years ago
- Fate: Acquired by Morgan Stanley
- Headquarters: Calgary, Canada
- Area served: Worldwide
- Key people: Marcos Lopez (CEO)
- Products: Shareworks: Equity Administration; Financial Reporting; Participant Experience; Forms Filing; Global Intelligence; Cap Table; Scenarios; Mobile App; 409A Valuations
- Revenue: ▲US$108.3 million (2018)
- Number of employees: 781
- Website: www.shareworks.com

Solium Capital, now known as Shareworks by Morgan Stanley, is a subscription-software (SaaS) company headquartered in Calgary, Alberta, Canada. It is best known for Shareworks, software used by public and private companies to manage their employee stock options and/or cap tables. It also does 409A valuations (see Internal Revenue Code section 409A). The company has ~3,000 clients and has offices in Canada, the United States, the UK, Europe and Australia. Morgan Stanley announced a definitive agreement to acquire Solium in February 2019 for approximately CAD$1.1 billion (US$900 million), a 40% premium over the recent trading price.

== History ==
Solium was founded 1999 by two Calgary-based financial advisers, John Kenny and Mark Van Hees. In 2001, the company made its initial public offering (IPO) on the TSX Venture Exchange. Early clients included TransAlta, Encana Corp., and Shell Canada Ltd. In 2004, Solium became profitable.

In 2010, Solium acquired Computershare's Transcentive business. In this transaction, Solium acquired the Express Options software platform, which UBS white-labeled.

In 2011, Solium opened an office in London, UK.

In 2012, Solium acquired the CapMx business from Silicon Valley Bank.

In 2013, Barclays Corporate and Employer Solutions announced a partnership with Solium to white-label Shareworks.

In 2014, Solium opened an office in Sydney, Australia. Later that year, BHP Billiton became a client.

In 2016, Morgan Stanley announced that it would use Shareworks to serve its U.S. clients.

In 2017, UBS began to white-label Shareworks to run its Equity Plan Advisory Services.

In 2017, Solium acquired Capshare and let it continue to run as an independent entity.

in 2018, Solium acquired Advanced-HR, a U.S. company that provides compensation data and compensation planning software for private and venture backed companies.

In 2019, Solium was acquired by Morgan Stanley at a price of CAD$19.15 per Common Share. The total transaction was valued at approximately CAD$1.1 billion (US$900 million).
