= Neo Financial =

Canadian financial technology company

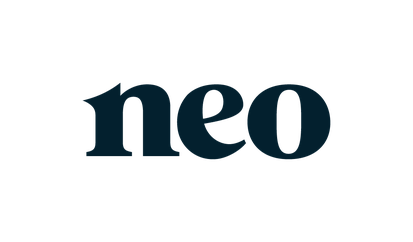
- Type: Private
- Industry: Financial services, financial technology
- Founded: 2019
- Founder: Andrew Chau; Jeff Adamson; Kris Read; Chris Simair
- Headquarters: Calgary, Alberta, Canada
- Area served: Canada
- Key people: Andrew Chau (chief executive officer); Jeff Adamson (chief commercial officer); Chris Simair (president); Kris Read (head of engineering)
- Products: Credit cards; savings and cash accounts; investing; mortgages; merchant loyalty and rewards programs
- Number of employees: 750 (2024)
- Website: www.neofinancial.com

Neo Financial is a Canadian financial technology company headquartered in Calgary. Neo develops consumer banking products in partnership with regulated financial institutions and provides co-branded credit and loyalty programs to Canadian retailers.

== History ==
Neo Financial was founded in 2019 by former SkipTheDishes executives Andrew Chau, Jeff Adamson, Kris Read, and Chris Simair

In September 2020, Neo launched its first Mastercard credit card along with its own merchant partner rewards network offering cashback at participating businesses.

In January 2021 Neo launched a savings account program using Concentra Bank as its deposit-holding partner, ensuring coverage through the Canada Deposit Insurance Corporation (CDIC). In 2024 Neo transitioned to Peoples Bank of Canada as its partner for new and existing everyday accounts.

In 2022, the company expanded in Calgary with new offices in the Edison tower and the Hudson’s Bay building. Neo maintains a secondary headquarters in Winnipeg, supported by a provincial expansion grant.

== Products and services ==
Neo Financial provides various financial services, including credit cards, deposit accounts, and mortgage services.

=== Credit cards ===
Neo offers both secured and unsecured versions across its credit card portfolio.

==== Neo-branded cards ====
- Neo Mastercard (2020)
- Neo World Mastercard (2024)
- Neo World Elite Mastercard (2024)

==== Co-branded cards ====
- Hudson’s Bay Mastercard powered by Neo (2021–2025)
- Tim Hortons Mastercard powered by Neo (2023-2026)
- Cathay World Elite Mastercard powered by Neo (2023)
- United MileagePlus Neo World Elite Mastercard (2026)

=== Deposit accounts ===
Neo offers chequing, savings, and cash deposit accounts. Eligible deposits are held with partner banks and are insured by the Canada Deposit Insurance Corporation (CDIC).

- Neo Everyday Account
- Neo High-Interest Savings Account (transitioned to Neo Savings in 2025)
- Neo Savings (Neo Cash)

=== Mortgages ===
Neo Mortgage provides residential mortgage products through regulated lending partners.

=== Investing ===
Neo Invest provides access to registered and non-registered investment accounts through partner investment dealers, one of them being OneVest.

=== Merchant rewards network ===
Neo operates a merchant rewards network offering cashback at participating businesses. According to independent reports, the network includes over 11,000 partners across Canada.

== Funding ==
Neo Financial has raised venture capital and debt financing totalling over 600 million dollars CAD from institutional investors.

- Series A (December 2020): CAD $50 million (equity and debt)
- Series B (September 2021): CAD $64 million
- Series C (May 2022): CAD $145 million
- Series D (November 2024): CAD $360 million

Media coverage in 2024 noted that the Series D round included investment from Tencent, a Chinese technology conglomerate, prompting public discussion related to national-security considerations. Tencent has previously invested in other large fintechs, including UK-based Monzo and Singapore-based Airwallex.

== Reception ==
Neo Financial has received mixed public reception. On the Better Business Bureau website, the company has a low rating based on customer reviews, with complaints frequently citing delays in customer service responses and rewards related issues. In contrast, Neo Financial’s mobile application is rated positively on major app distribution platforms, with an average rating of 4.7 out of 5 on Google Play and 4.8 out of 5 on the Apple App Store, based on tens of thousands of user reviews.

Some observers have raised questions about consumer protection given Neo's structure as a financial technology company using partner banks rather than operating as a licensed bank. While this distinction is important for consumers to understand, Canadian regulators recognize this fintech model as a viable structure. Like Koho and Wealthsimple, Neo offers savings and chequing accounts without holding a banking license, with customer funds held at CDIC-insured Canadian licensed banks, providing equivalent deposit protection to traditional banks.

In 2024 Neo’s Series D financing attracted scrutiny because it included investment from Tencent, a Chinese technology conglomerate that appears on a United States Department of Defense list of companies with alleged military ties. Canadian outlets reported that this raised national-security questions in the context of pending Retail Payments Activities Act oversight.

=== Industry recognition ===
Neo Financial has received recognition for its expansion and technological innovation.

- Ranked first in Deloitte's Technology Fast 50 Companies to Watch (2023)
- Ranked first overall in Deloitte Canada's Technology Fast 50 (2024)
- Ranked No. 1 on The Globe and Mail's Canada's Top Growing Companies list (2024)
- Ranked first for a third consecutive year in Deloitte's Enterprise Industry Leaders category (2025)

== Regulation ==
Neo operates as a fintech firm while relying on partner banks for regulated services. It has been registered as a money services business with the Financial Transactions and Reports Analysis Centre of Canada since November 8, 2022.

== See also ==
- Banking as a service
- Neobank
