= Attabotics =

Robotics company

Attabotics Inc.
- Type: Privately held company
- Industry: Robotics design and manufacturing
- Founded: 2016; 10 years ago
- Founder: Scott Gravelle
- Headquarters: Calgary, Alberta, Canada
- Key people: Scott Gravelle (CEO, CTO)
- Revenue: ~$30 million (2018)
- Number of employees: >230 (2019)
- Website: attabotics.com

Attabotics was a robotics company based in Calgary, Alberta, Canada that specialized in Automated Storage and Retrieval System (AS/RS) inventory management systems. Founded in 2016, the company designed and manufactured robots that operate within a modular, three-dimensional storage structure that minimizes the traditional fulfillment center footprint.

In July 2025, Attabotics filed for bankruptcy protection.

As of September 2025, Attabotics assets were purchased by Lafayette Engineering Inc, based out of Kentucky USA.

== Origins ==
The Attabotics system grew out of a thought experiment about what an automated warehouse designed specifically for robots might look like. After exploring multiple designs, founder Scott Gravelle took inspiration from the natural world:

"The original inspiration for the company was the leaf-cutter ant, whose Latin name is ‘Atta’... I saw a documentary where a researcher had poured molten aluminum down an ant colony and then dug it up. Ants integrate goods vertically."—Scott Gravelle, Attabotics Founder, CEO, CTO

== Technology ==
Attabotics' 3D storage system, known as The Studio, integrates order picking, packing, and shipping into a single solution, which consists of four interconnected systems:

- The Gallery: A modular, cube-based storage facility that provides three-dimensional access to inventory stored inside. Dense and stackable up to 9 meters, the Gallery can reduce warehouse space requirements by up to 85%.
- The Attabot Blade: An intelligent robot designed to move horizontally and vertically throughout the Gallery structure to retrieve good and deliver them for sortation, packing, and shipping. Each robot functions independently and can access any bin without having to dig to reach it. The latest generation of Attabot was re-engineered in 2022 following millions of test cycles.
- The Nodes: Configurable workstations incorporated into the Gallery where items are delivered for sortation. Additional nodes can be installed at any time to increase productivity.
- The Weave: A proprietary order management and control software that efficiently manages robot movement and order fulfillment. Optimized for the Gallery's three-dimensional design, it allows for intelligent inventory management and customized order processing.

Although the first generation of Attabotics solutions utilized existing technologies to deliver a proof-of-concept and pilot model, later designs incorporate several proprietary designs developed by the company.

== History ==
Attabotics was founded by Scott Gravelle in 2016 to capitalize on emerging opportunities in the growing AS/RS robotics market. The company developed their initial proof of concept in 2017 and received an investment from Alberta Innovates.

In December 2018 the company announced the development of a new manufacturing site at Calgary's YYC Global Logistics Park in partnership with Opportunity Calgary Investment Fund. Also in 2018 the company begins its partnership with Gordon Food Service, one of North America's largest foodservice distributors to automate elements of its supply chain.

In June 2019 the company announced their plans to build a new headquarters in Calgary. In May 2019 established a new partnership with Microsoft to expand edge computing, LTE networking, and IoT capabilities.

In December of 2020 Attabotics received a $34 million investment from the Government of Canada.

In May of 2021 the company announced a partnership with AltaML and the Alberta Machine Intelligence Institute (Amii) to improve supply chain efficiencies. In August of 2021 Attabotics filed a Patent infringement suit against competitor Urbx.

In 2022 Attabotics expanded to work with companies in South Korea and the EU through partnerships and agreements with various companies, including Körber. In October of 2022 Attabotics was selected by KPMG and the United States Department of Defense for a new warehouse for the Marine Corps Logistics Command. The company faced a customer lawsuit in July 2022. In September of 2022 Richard Cheung was hired as the Chief Financial Officer.

On March 15, 2023, there was a fire at a Canadian Tire distribution center where an Attabotics system was operating. Each company blamed the other, with Attabotics suing its customer. There had been two earlier fires in 2021, caused by earlier Attabotics equipment (one at the same location and another at a Nordstrom facility).

On June 29, 2025, employees received a mass email informing them of immediate termination. Attabotics filed for bankruptcy the same week. Later analyses of the collapse cited over-spending and deteriorating trust from customers and investors, resulting from the company's aggressive expansion despite reliability problems involving the hardware and firmware.

== Awards and recognition ==
- CNBC Upstart 100 (2019)
- Time Magazine’s Best Inventions of 2019
- CNBC Disruptor 50 Company (2020)
- CBInsights Retail Tech 100 for 2020
- Fast Company's 32nd Most Innovative Company of 2020
- BIG Innovation Award (2022)
- Fast Company's 8th Most Innovative Robotics Company of 2023
