= Hg Capital Trust =

British investment trust

- Industry: Investment trust
- Founded: 1989
- Headquarters: British
- Website: Official website

Hg Capital Trust (LSE: HGT.L) is a large British investment trust dedicated to investments in unquoted investments. Established in 1989, the company is a constituent of the FTSE 250 Index. The chairman is Jim Strang.
