= Association of Couriers of Kazakhstan =

Trade union of food couriers in Kazakhstan

ACK
- Association of Couriers of Kazakhstan
- Ассоциации курьеров Казахстана
- Founded: May 2021
- Location: Kazakhstan
- Key people: Zhenis Orynaliev, Chairman

The Association of Couriers of Kazakhstan (ACK; Kazakh: Ассоциации курьеров Казахстана) is a trade union of food courier workers in Kazakhstan. The union encompasses workers from all food delivery workers active in Kazakhstan, including Wolt, Glovo, Yandex.Food and Chocofood.

== History ==
The union was founded in May 2021, following a strike of Wolt drivers in Almaty. 40 workers had initially laid down work on May 13 after payment per ride had been reduced by between 30 and 50 percent. They demanded a return to the earlier payment scheme; in response, the company blocked them from its systems, in effect laying them off. After another strike by 100 drivers on May 18, all laid off workers were reinstated and the payment scheme reverted.
