= Gigs =

American technology company

Gigs, Inc.
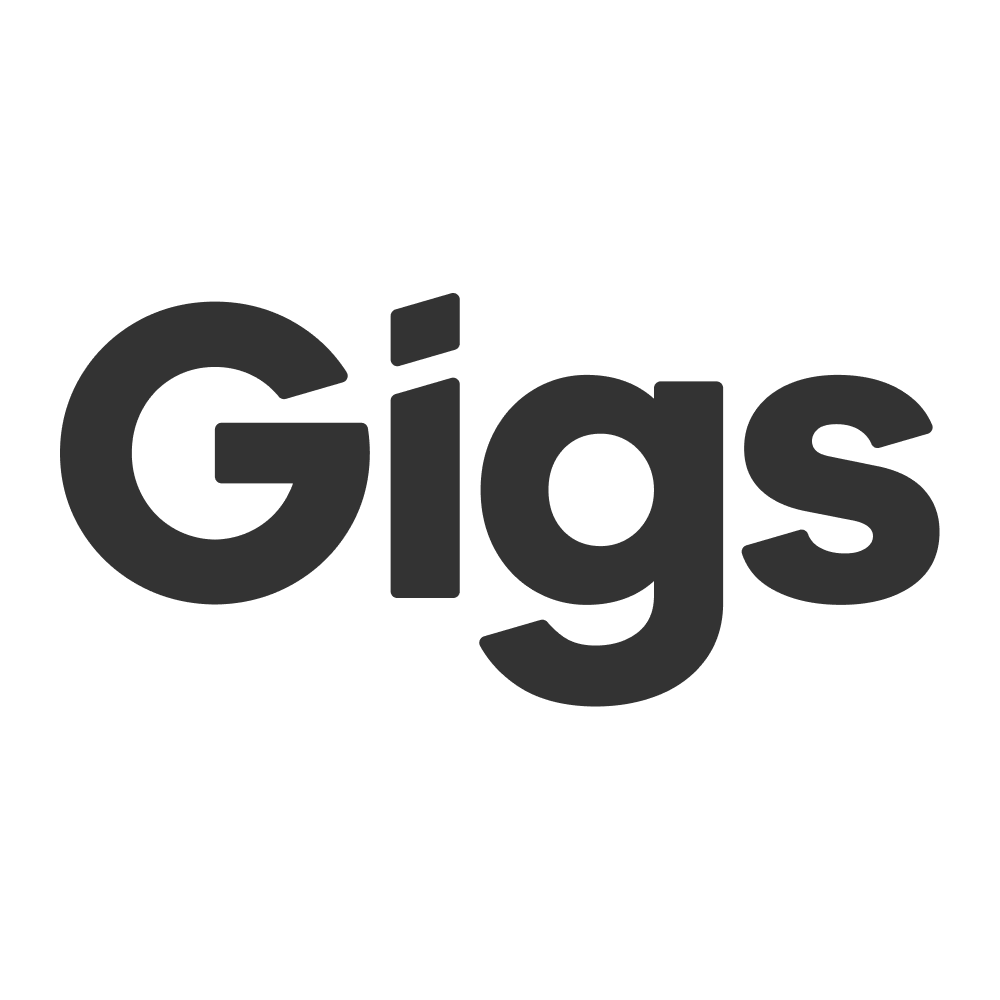
- Company type: Private
- Industry: Telecommunications
- Founded: 2020; 6 years ago
- Founders: Hermann Frank and Dennis Bauer
- Headquarters: San Francisco
- Website: gigs.com

Gigs, Inc. is an American technology company in the telecommunications industry, headquartered in San Francisco, California, with additional offices in London (UK), Berlin (Germany), New York (US), and Amsterdam (Netherlands). Admitted to Y Combinator in 2021, the company specializes in embedded connectivity, enabling global businesses to launch their own branded mobile services.

== History ==
The company was founded by entrepreneurs Hermann Frank and Dennis Bauer in 2020. In 2021, the company was accepted into the Y Combinator accelerator program.

In 2022, the company completed a Series A investment round of $20 million, receiving backing from Google's Gradient Ventures, YC Continuity, Speedinvest, and business angels Tony Xu (CEO of DoorDash), Fidji Simo (CEO of Applications at OpenAI), Dara Khosrowshahi (CEO of Uber).

In 2023, Gigs announced an AI product for MVNOs called Operator, designed to reduce customer support overhead by up to 95%.

Gigs offers "MVNO in a box" technology, allowing companies to launch their wireless service through a white-label or through an API that allows companies to embed their wireless service directly into a customer's app or website. The company also provides wholesale connectivity, payments, OSS/BSS, telecom taxes, and more.

The company supports connectivity for fintechs such as Revolut, Klarna, Nubank, Wealthsimple and Lendable, as well as phone manufacturers such as Light, Murena and Punkt.

In December 2024, Gigs announced their partnership with Vodafone. In the same week, the company also announced that it had raised $73 million in a Series B funding round led by Ribbit Capital.

In 2025, Gigs provided their own eSIM products to LATAM Airlines and Walmart's One Pay services. In September, AT&T announced its partnership with the company to enable more U.S. tech companies to launch their own mobile services. Later that year, Lendable launched Zable Mobile with Gigs and Revolut launched full in-app mobile service powered by Gigs OS on Vodafone.

In 2026, Gigs' customer list expanded with the additions of Sezzle and Tide.
