= Cristina Junqueira =

Brazilian businesswoman (born 1982)

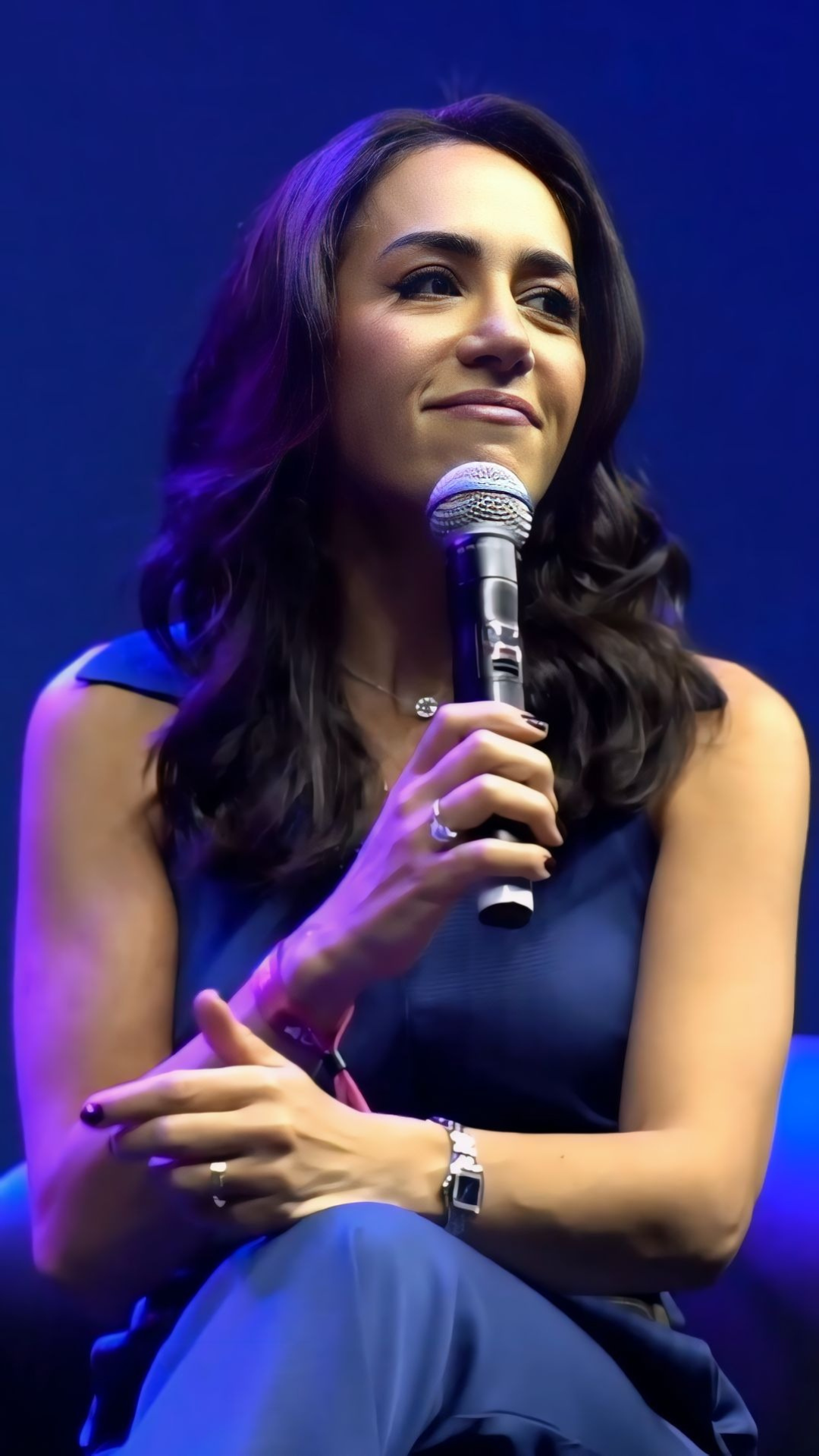
- Born: September 1982 (age 44); Ribeirão Preto, São Paulo, Brazil
- Education: University of São Paulo; Northwestern University
- Known for: Co-founder of Nubank
- Spouse: Rubens Pereira
- Children: 4

Cristina Junqueira (born September 1982) is a Brazilian businesswoman who is the co-founder of Nubank.

Junqueira has been a strong advocate for gender inclusion in the workplace. As cofounder of Nubank, she has led the company's policy on inclusivity programs and fought to increase female representation in both tech and finance. Junqueira is currently the CEO of the company's emerging operations in the United States

== Early life and education ==
Junqueira was born in September 1982 in Ribeirão Preto, in the state of São Paulo, Brazil.

Shortly after her birth, her family moved to Rio de Janeiro, where she was raised as the eldest of four sisters. She attended St. Ignatius College, a Jesuit high school in Rio's Botafogo district.

In 2000 Junqueira moved to São Paulo for university, enrolling at the University of São Paulo (USP). She earned a bachelor's degree in industrial engineering from USP in 2004. Cristina Junqueira began her career as an associate consultant at Boston Consulting Group while pursuing a Master's in economic and financial modeling at the Universidade de São Paulo. Upon returning to Brazil, she joined Unibanco, leading its small and medium-sized business sector. After Unibanco merged with Itaú, she became a portfolio manager, contributing to one of the largest private banking entities in Brazil. She simultaneously pursued and obtained her master's degree in economic and financial modeling at USP by 2006. She then moved to the United States to attend Northwestern University's Kellogg School of Management, and earned her MBA in 2008.

== Career ==
=== Early banking career ===
After completing her MBA, Junqueira returned to Brazil in 2008 and joined Unibanco as head of the small and medium-sized enterprises (SME). The following year, Unibanco merged with Banco Itaú to form Itaú Unibanco, and Junqueira became a portfolio manager in the merged bank's credit card department.

In 2009, she transferred to LuizaCred, a consumer credit venture of Itaú Unibanco and retailer Magazine Luiza, where she served as head of marketing and products from 2009 to 2012. By 2012, Junqueira had rejoined Itaú Unibanco as the manager of its credit card portfolio (Itaúcard).

=== Nubank ===
During Junqueira's tenure at Itaú Unibanco and its subsidiaries, she observed structural limitations within Brazil's banking system. At the time, approximately five banks controlled around 80% of the market, and consumers commonly faced high fees and interest rates.

After five years at Itaú, Junqueira proposed initiatives such as commission-free credit cards and improved customer communication. According to interviews, these suggestions were not adopted by the institution. In 2013, she left her role as a product manager to pursue an alternative model.

Shortly thereafter, she was introduced to David Vélez, a venture capitalist formerly with Sequoia Capital, who had also expressed dissatisfaction with the Brazilian banking landscape. The two shared similar views on the need for more accessible and technology-driven financial solutions. Vélez invited her to join him in building what would become Nubank. They were soon joined by software engineer Edward Wible.

"Nubank" was chosen as the name to represent their venture. In addition to "nu"phonetically sounding similar to the word "new", it means "nude" in Portuguese, symbolizing a transparent approach to banking.

In December 2021, Nubank debuted on the New York Stock Exchange as Nu Holdings, reaching an initial valuation of over US$50 billion. At that point, Junqueira's equity briefly placed her among Brazil's self-made female billionaires.

== Awards and recognition ==
She is Brazil's second self-made woman billionaire. She was recognized by Fortune's 40 under 40 list and featured in fintech magazines as one of Latin America's prominent startup founders. In 2021, Junqueira was selected as a Bloomberg New Economy Catalyst. As part of the program, she attended the annual New Economy Forum held in Singapore, and the Bloomberg New Economy Catalyst Retreat that same year.

== Personal life ==
Junqueira is married to Rubens Pereira. They have been together since 2006 and have three daughters. Junqueira commented on raising daughters and being a positive role model, saying, “I want my daughters to grow up in a world where they can dream of being whoever they want to be—and you can’t dream of what you can’t see.”
