= Andy Fang =

Co-founder of DoorDash (born 1992)

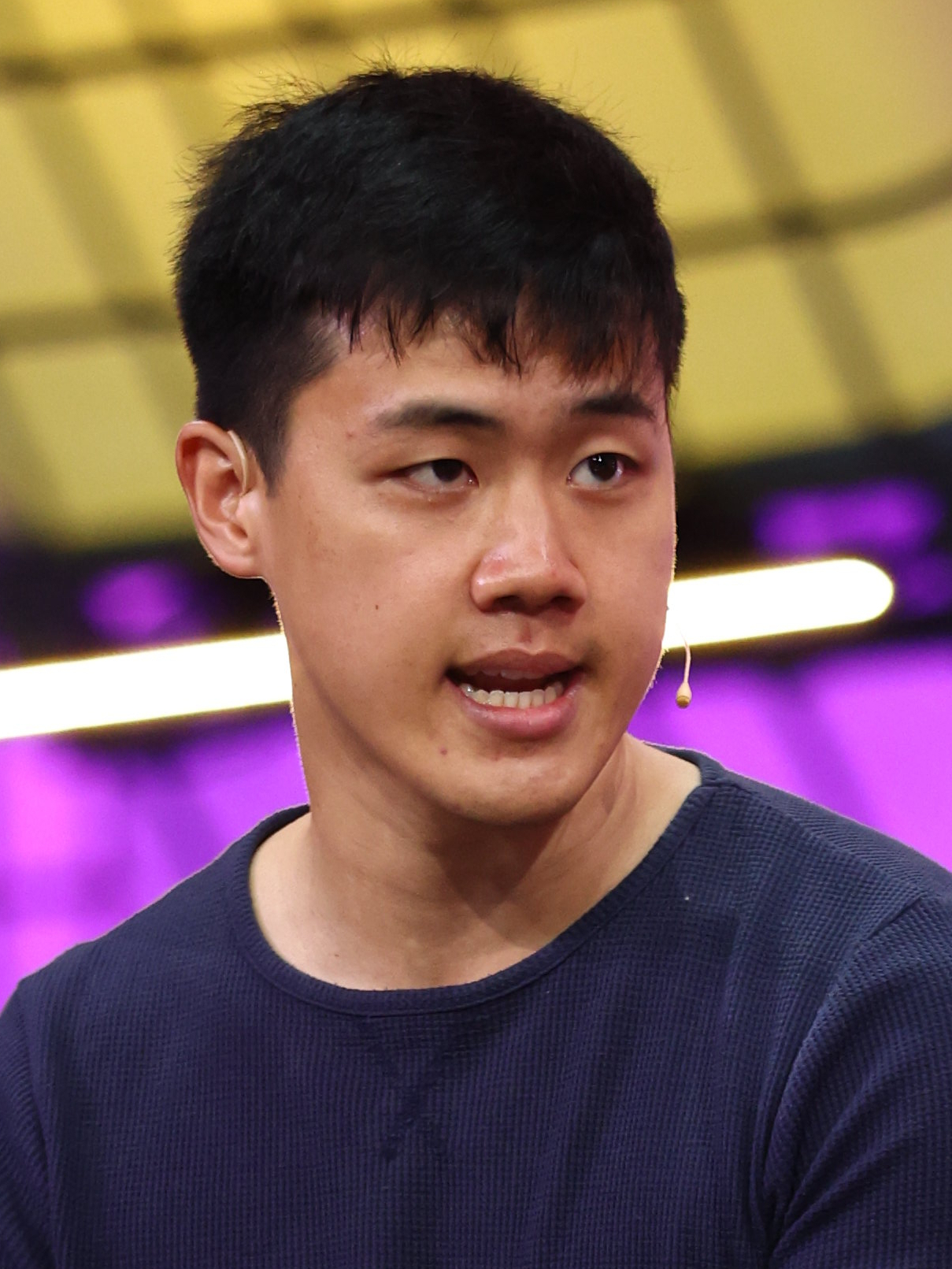
- Fang in 2022
- Born: 1992 (age 33–34); San Jose, California, U.S.
- Education: Stanford University (BS)
- Known for: Co-founding DoorDash
- Spouse: Carol Zhao (m. 2024)

Andy Fang (born 1992) is an American billionaire Internet entrepreneur who co-founded the food delivery company DoorDash. As of December 2025, Forbes Australia estimated his net worth at $1.8 billion.

== Early life and education ==
Fang was born in San Jose, California, as one of four children in a Taiwanese American family. His parents were immigrants from Taiwan. He grew up in the San Francisco Bay Area, where he excelled academically at the Harker School, graduating in 2010. Fang then attended Stanford University and graduated with his Bachelor of Science (B.S.) degree in computer science. As a freshman undergraduate, he was roommates with Stanley Tang, with whom he built a social calendar app, and met Tony Xu in an engineering and business course.

== Career ==
While they were still students at Stanford, Fang, along with Stanley Tang and Tony Xu, founded DoorDash, an online food ordering and food delivery platform, in 2013. When the company was founded, the three made DoorDash deliveries themselves. From May 2013 to February 2019, Fang was the company's chief technology officer (CTO).

DoorDash was established in 2013 as a class project for a joint Engineering and Business school class. Initially named PaloAltoDelivery.com, the founders perceived that most local small businesses had not solved how to deliver food. Fang says "when you tried to get food delivered in Palo Alto, back in 2013, it was really only Domino's Pizza and the local Chinese restaurant." DoorDash had its IPO in December 2020, making Fang's net worth an estimated $2.2 billion as of December 2020.

As of March 2025, Fang owns approximately 4% of DoorDash and is its head of consumer engineering.

== Personal life ==
Fang married Canadian tennis player Carol Zhao on July 20, 2024, at the Belmond Villa San Michele in Florence, Italy. They were both undergraduates at Stanford.
