= Tony Xu =

CEO of DoorDash

- 徐迅
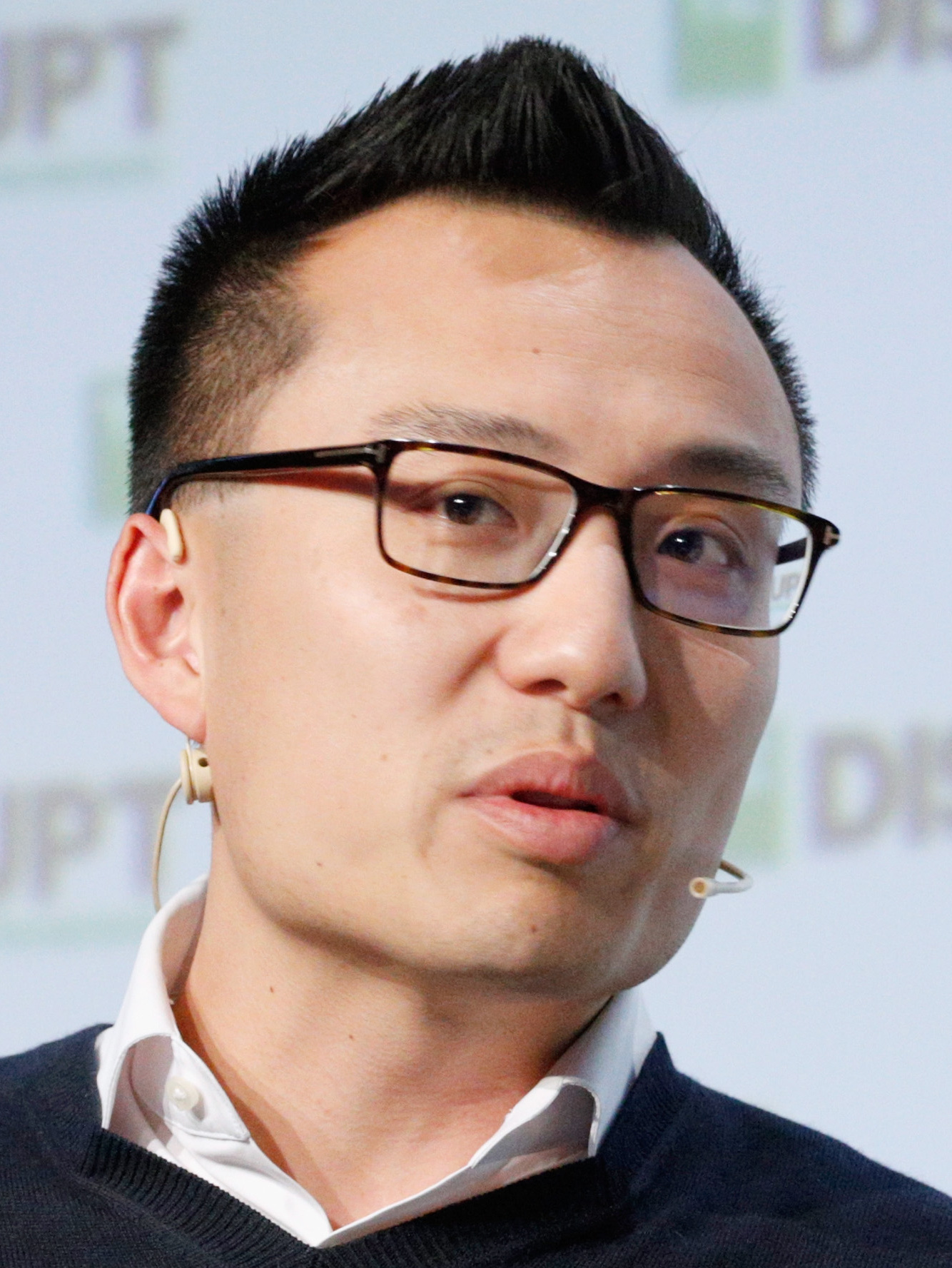
- Xu in 2018
- Born: Xu Xun; 1983 or 1984 (age 41–42); Nanjing, China
- Education: University of California, Berkeley (BS); Stanford University (MBA)
- Occupation: CEO of DoorDash
- Spouse: Patti Xu
- Children: 2

Chinese name
- Chinese: 徐迅
Transcriptions
Standard Mandarin
- Hanyu Pinyin: Xú Xùn
- IPA: [ɕy̌ ɕŷn]

Tony Xu (Chinese: 徐迅; pinyin: Xú Xùn; born Xu Xun, 1983/1984) is a Chinese-born American billionaire businessman and the co-founder and CEO of DoorDash.

Xu was born in Nanjing, China, and immigrated to the United States with his parents at the age of four. He earned degrees from the University of California, Berkeley, and the Stanford Graduate School of Business. Early in his career, Xu interned at Square, Inc., and worked for McKinsey & Company, eBay, and PayPal. He was included in Fortune's 40 Under 40 in 2020.

DoorDash had its IPO in December 2020, making Xu's net worth an estimated $2.8 billion as of April 2021. He and his wife Patti are signatories to the Giving Pledge.

== Early life and education ==
Xu was born in Nanjing, China. In 1989, his parents immigrated to Champaign, Illinois. His mother, Julie Cao, was a Chinese doctor who later opened acupuncture and medical clinics in Champaign and the San Francisco Bay Area. His father was a professor in China who studied aerospace engineering and applied mathematics at the University of Illinois Urbana-Champaign, where he earned his Ph.D.

Xu began working at an early age, at times washing dishes at the same restaurant where his mother worked. He legally changed his name from Xu Xun to Tony Xu, inspired by his favorite television series, Who's the Boss?, in which Tony Danza plays Tony Micelli. Xu earned his Bachelor of Science degree in industrial engineering and operations research from the UC Berkeley College of Engineering and his Master of Business Administration degree from the Stanford Graduate School of Business in 2013.

== Career ==
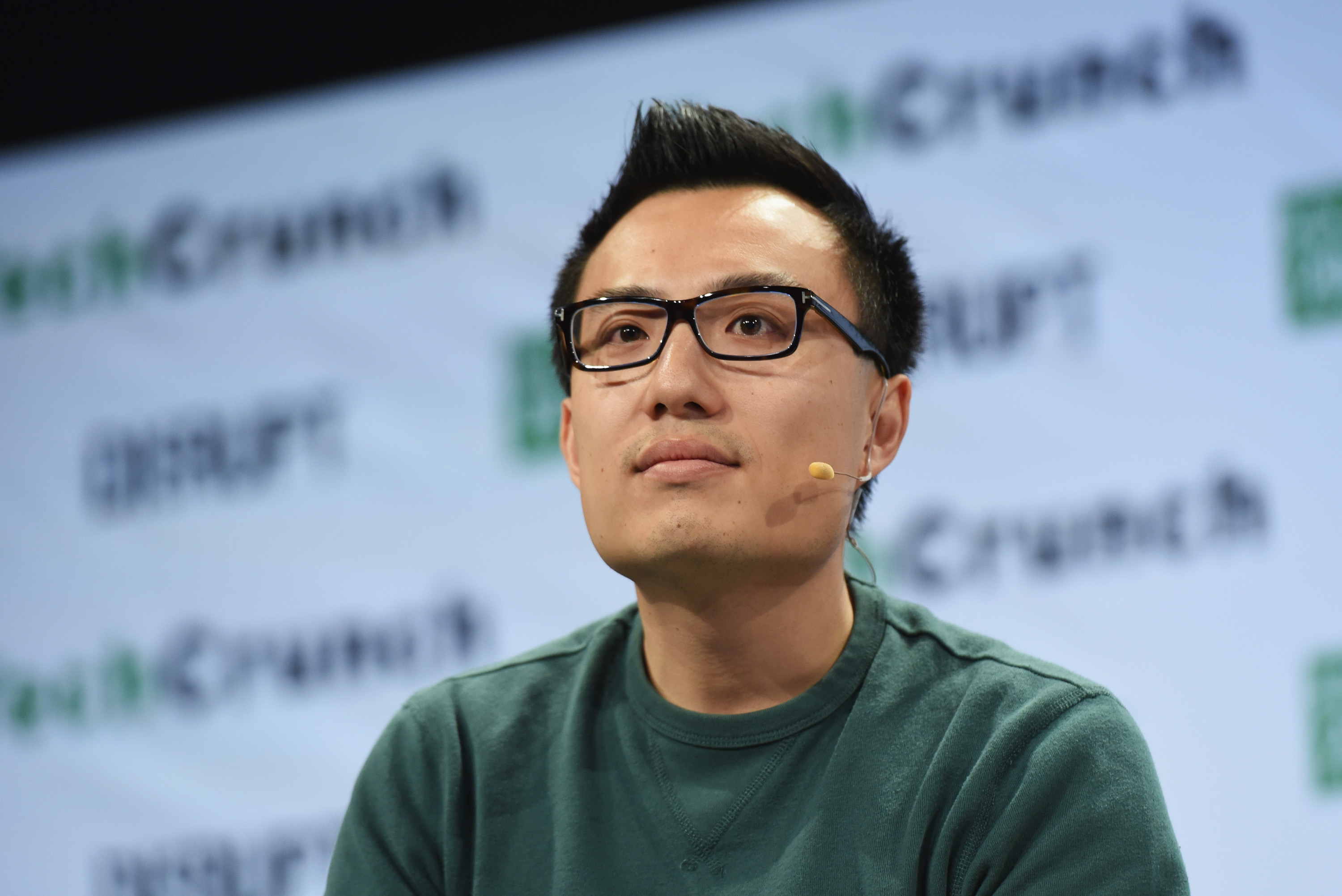
Xu in 2016

Early in his career, Xu interned at the financial services and digital payments company Square, Inc. and completed business development work for the e-commerce app RedLaser. He also worked as a business analyst for the management consulting firm McKinsey & Company, and as a corporate strategy consultant for eBay and PayPal.

Xu co-founded the delivery platform DoorDash in 2013 with Stanford classmates Andy Fang, Evan Moore, and Stanley Tang; the group had previously worked together to launch the predecessor delivery service PaloAltoDelivery.com in 2012. Xu has said his immigrant parents, and especially his mother's restaurant work, helped inspire DoorDash. Initially, he and other DoorDash employees completed food deliveries. Xu continues to be CEO, and owns an approximately five percent stake in the company. DoorDash's initial public offering in 2020, which Xu has been credited for leading, made him a billionaire at the age of 36. He has voting authority over all Class B shares, giving him control of DoorDash with 69 percent of the voting interest, as of December 2020.

In 2020, Xu was included in Fortune's "40 Under 40" list. In 2022, he became an angel investor in the Gigs startup. In 2026, he was listed under Forbes "Self-Made 250: The Greatest Living Self-Made Americans".

=== Board service and investments ===
In addition to DoorDash's board of directors, Xu is a board member of the Silicon Valley Chinese Association Foundation and an executive council member of TechNet.

In January 2022, Xu joined the board of directors of Meta Platforms.

Xu has invested in the blockchain technology provider Alchemy, as well as ghost kitchens All Day Kitchens and Local Kitchens.

== Charities ==
Signatories to the Giving Pledge, he and his wife Patti have made significant donations in support of Berkeley, Northwestern, and the Asian American and Pacific Islander (AAPI) community.

== Personal life ==
Xu lives in San Francisco. He and his wife Patti met at church while they were undergraduates at Berkeley and married in 2013; the couple have two children.

Xu enjoys running and used to participate in marathons. He has described himself as an "avid" Golden State Warriors and basketball fan, and has credited the sport and television for helping him learn English.

== Publications ==
- Xu, Tony (November 29, 2020). "Building the future of work, right now". Business Insider.
