= Deliveroo =

US-owned British food delivery company

Roofoods Ltd
- Logo used since 2016
- Trade name: Deliveroo
- Type: Private limited company
- Industry: Online food ordering; Food delivery
- Founded: 2013; 13 years ago
- Founder: Will Shu; Greg Orlowski
- Headquarters: London, England
- Area served: United Kingdom; France; Belgium; Ireland; Italy; Kuwait; United Arab Emirates
- Key people: Claudia Arney (chair); Will Shu (CEO); Eric French (COO); Carlo Mocci (CBO)
- Revenue: ▲£2,071.9 million (2024)
- Operating income: ▲£(12.4) million (2024)
- Net income: ▲£(0.1) million (2024)
- Number of employees: 135,000 self-employed couriers (2025)
- Parent: DoorDash
- Website: deliveroo.co.uk

Roofoods Ltd, trading as Deliveroo, is a British multinational online food delivery company owned by DoorDash since its takeover in October 2025. Based in London, it worked with around 182,000 restaurants, grocers, and retailers as of August of the previous year.

The firm also provides delivery and technology for on-demand grocery to major UK retailers. In addition, Deliveroo Editions is its subsidiary operation that operates dark kitchens for the preparation of delivery-only meals.

Its initial public offering was widely reported as one of the worst debuts in the history of the London Stock Exchange (LSE), with shares falling sharply on the first day of trading.

DoorDash brand operations by country: DoorDash Deliveroo Wolt

== Business ==
=== History and basic operations ===
Deliveroo was founded in 2013 by Will Shu and Greg Orlowski. The company makes revenue by charging restaurants a commission fee, as well as by charging customers a per-order fee for delivery. It operates in the UK, France, Belgium, Ireland, Italy, Singapore, and United Arab Emirates. In 2022, Deliveroo launched an advertising platform enabling businesses to promote products across its app.

Customers place orders through its app or website, then self-employed bicycle or motorcycle couriers transport orders from restaurants to them. Since 2016 its logo has referenced a simplified kangaroo character.

In November 2017, Deliveroo introduced Deliveroo Plus, a subscription service which gives customers in the UK and Ireland unlimited free delivery.

Deliveroo works with some of the biggest chain restaurants across the UK, along with thousands of independent restaurants. On 16 November 2016, it became known that the brewing company Heineken International had closed a deal for Deliveroo to deliver the latter's beers and ciders, initially across 15 sites in London, Bath and Cardiff. This delivery deal, whose activities started that same week, was considered the biggest one of its kind (that is, with regards to the brewing industry).

In mid-June 2016, the founders of Deliveroo, Will Shu and Greg Orlowski received an award for the Best Startup Founders as part of The Europas Startup Conference and Awards, mainly given to technology companies. The company also received Fastest Rising Startup of the Year and the Europas Grand Prix award.

In January 2017, Deliveroo announced plans to create 300 tech jobs in the UK when it opened its new head office in London later in 2017. That month the company had more than 1,000 full-time employees. As of 2022, Deliveroo employs over 3,000 staff globally.

In April 2017, Deliveroo's Editions kitchens launched. These delivery-only kitchens allow restaurants to access customers in locations without needing High Street premises, thereby reducing set-up costs compared to a full-service restaurant. Deliveroo uses its data to identify areas where customer demand for certain cuisines is high and predicts which restaurants are likely to succeed there.

In June 2018, Deliveroo launched ‘Marketplace+’, which enables restaurants with their own delivery fleets to operate on Deliveroo's platform. These restaurants can also access Deliveroo's network of riders to extend their delivery services.

In May 2019, Amazon has partnered with the company to offer free delivery linked to Amazon Prime accounts.

In November 2019, Deliveroo launched ‘Pick-Up’ - a click & collect service allowing customers to order food for collection. Restaurants who had signed up to offer the service at its launch included Byron, Pizza Express and Pizza Hut. In March 2020, Deliveroo launched its on demand grocery service and has since partnered with retail chains M&S, Aldi, Waitrose, Sainsbury's and others.

In September 2021, Deliveroo launched rapid grocery delivery service HOP. The service promises delivery to customers “in as little as 10 minutes” with the first Deliveroo Hop dark store launched in central London, serving residents in Vauxhall and Battersea.

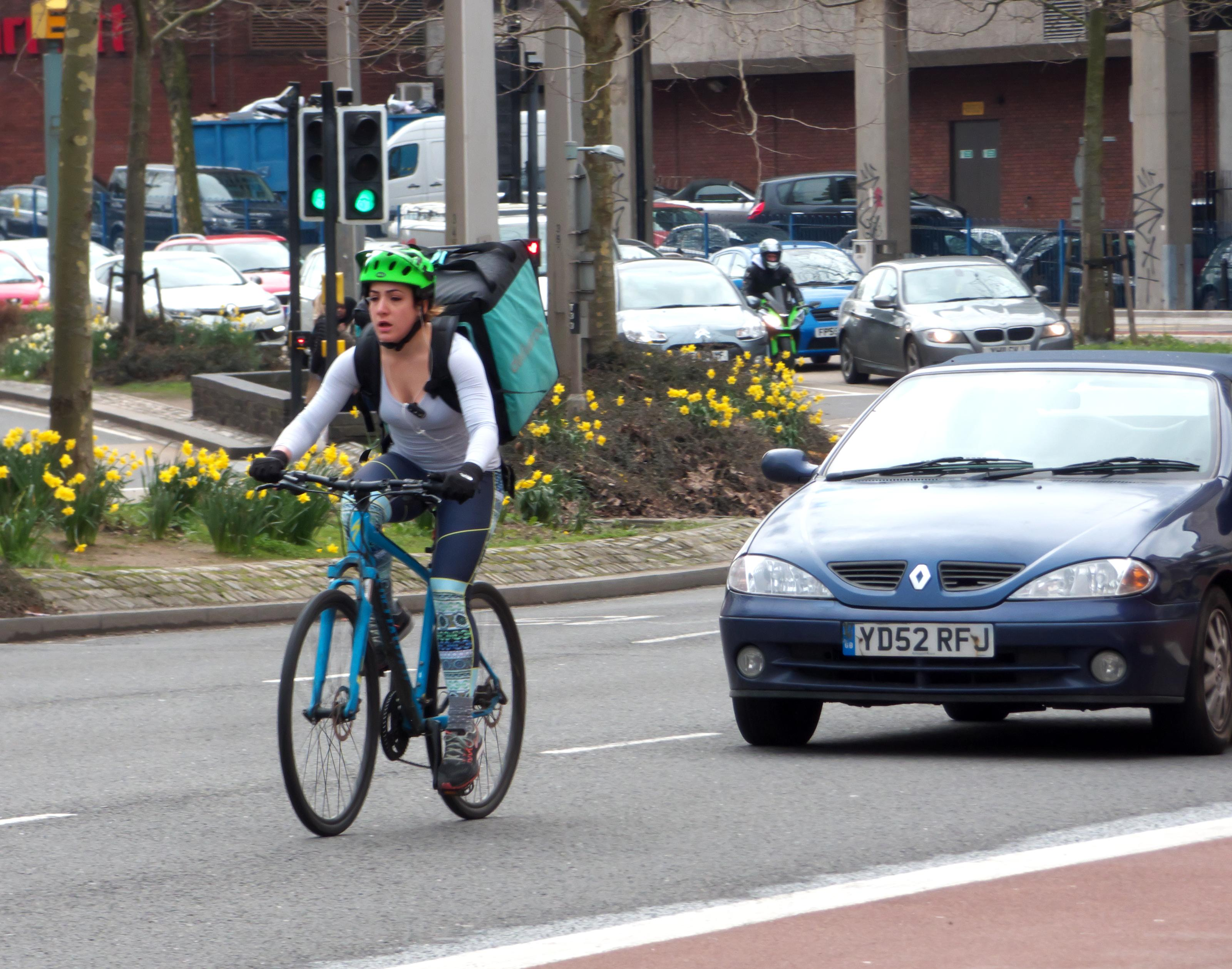
Deliveroo cyclist in the UK

Since 2021, Deliveroo has struck partnerships with major grocery partners including Morrisons, Waitrose, Co-op, Sainbury's, SPA, Asda and Wholefoods in the UK; and in international markets with Esselunga in Italy, Auchan in France and ParknShop in Hong Kong as part of its on demand grocery and HOP service. In the second half of 2022, grocery accounted for 11% of the company's Gross Transaction Value.

In October 2022, Deliveroo opened its first brick and mortar high street store on New Oxford Street. Customers are able to shop in-store by ordering through digital kiosks; ordering via the Deliveroo app for collection at the store; and for delivery to local residents, offices and other addresses via Deliveroo's network of riders. The Deliveroo HOP on New Oxford Street offers grocery items from Morrisons ‘Ready to Eat’ and ‘The Best’ ranges to store cupboard staples, snacks and dinner ingredients.

=== Economic impacts in the UK ===
In December 2017, a study by macroeconomic consultancy Capital Economics stated that Deliveroo had helped create 7,200 jobs across the restaurant sector since it launched in 2013. It also boosted the industry's revenue by £460 million in the year to June 2017. The report also found that Deliveroo had helped add £372 million in value to the UK economy in the same 12-month period, a figure which Capital Economics projected to rise to £1.5 billion in the year to June 2019.

=== Competition ===
Deliveroo's main competitors are Just Eat and Uber Eats. In 2021, Deliveroo expanded its UK population coverage to 77% compared to 53% at the end of 2020.

Deliveroo has made public its goal to build a leading market position (#1 or strong #2) in every market in which it operates. As a result of that goal, it ended its operations in the Netherlands on 30 November 2022, citing that "it would require a disproportionate level of investment, with uncertain returns, to reach and sustain a top-tier market position".

=== Layoffs or redundancies ===
In April 2020, Deliveroo made 15% of the workforce redundant, citing COVID-19 as the reason.

In Feb 2023, Deliveroo made 9% of the workforce redundant, with CEO Will Shu saying the reason was having “in recent years we grew our headcount very quickly. This was a response to unprecedented growth rates supported by Covid-related tail winds. I should have had a more balanced approach to headcount growth."

=== Technical malfunctions ===
On 7 September 2016, the Deliveroo website and application crashed in the British city of Chelmsford, reportedly due to a high demand on the first night of launching its service there.

On Tuesday 1 November 2016, at around 8 pm (GMT), technical problems caused the Deliveroo system in the UK to go offline for around an hour. Reportedly, thousands of customers who had already paid for their orders got upset due to a lack of clear communication being provided by the company during the incident, with some customers having to wait hours to get their food delivered.

During any periods when the system is down, and therefore no deliveries are available for riders, Deliveroo pays riders a flat rate per hour until the system is restored.

=== Funding ===
In June 2014, Deliveroo raised a £2.75 million series A investment round from Index Ventures and Hoxton Ventures, as well as an assortment of angel investors. In January 2015, Roofoods Ltd, doing business as Deliveroo, received US$25 million in series B funding led by Accel with participation from Index Ventures, Hummingbird Ventures and Hoxton Ventures at an estimated valuation of $100 million. At this time, Deliveroo was providing deliveries for approximately 750 restaurants. In July of that year, it secured a further $70 million in series C investment from Index Ventures and Greenoaks Capital, marking Deliveroo's third funding round in a year.

In November 2015, Deliveroo raised $100 million in Series D Funding. In August 2016, Deliveroo raised a Series E of $275 million from the hedge fund Bridgepoint.

In September 2017, the company announced a $385 million Series F round. In November of the same year, an additional $98 million was announced, bringing the total Series F round to $480 million.

In May 2019, the company announced a $575 million Series G round led by Amazon, bringing the total raised to date to $1.35 billion.

In January 2021, the company announced a $180 million Series H round raised from existing investors, bringing the total raised to date to $1.53 billion.

=== Taylor Review ===
In October 2016, British Prime Minister Theresa May announced a review of employment practices in the modern economy, chaired by Chief Executive of the RSA Matthew Taylor. The review was criticised, accusing the probe of being biased as it was revealed by the Financial Times that one of its members was an early backer of Deliveroo, a fact that was not disclosed to the public. In its submission to the review, Deliveroo called on the Government to update legislation to allow the company to offer its riders rights – such as injury pay and sick pay – without limiting the flexibility which comes with self-employment. The company was the first in the on-demand economy to ask for changes in legislation to enable it to offer self-employed riders more benefits.

Deliveroo argued that current employment legislation meant that companies in the on-demand economy were forced to choose between offering riders flexible work or benefits. Deliveroo suggested that the Government either allow companies to offer entitlements to self-employed people, or create a new category of employment in which benefits are calculated on the services they deliver instead of how many hours they work.

=== Rider working conditions ===
In March 2016, Australian-based employment lawyer Josh Bornstein, principal at Maurice Blackburn, examined work contracts from Deliveroo and its competitor Foodora and described the contracts as "sham", designed to pay workers "below the award rates" and to "deny their basic benefits". Maurice Blackburn announced that test cases against Deliveroo, as well as against Foodora, were being prepared wherein they were "accused of under-paying their delivery riders and failing to meet minimum employment conditions". Such allegations were confirmed by the Young Workers Centre in Australia, which claimed that the contracting arrangements by those companies left workers without access to minimum pay rates, WorkCover insurance, leave and superannuation. The centre's "Rights for Riders" campaign aims "to improve safety, pay, conditions and job security for food delivery riders".

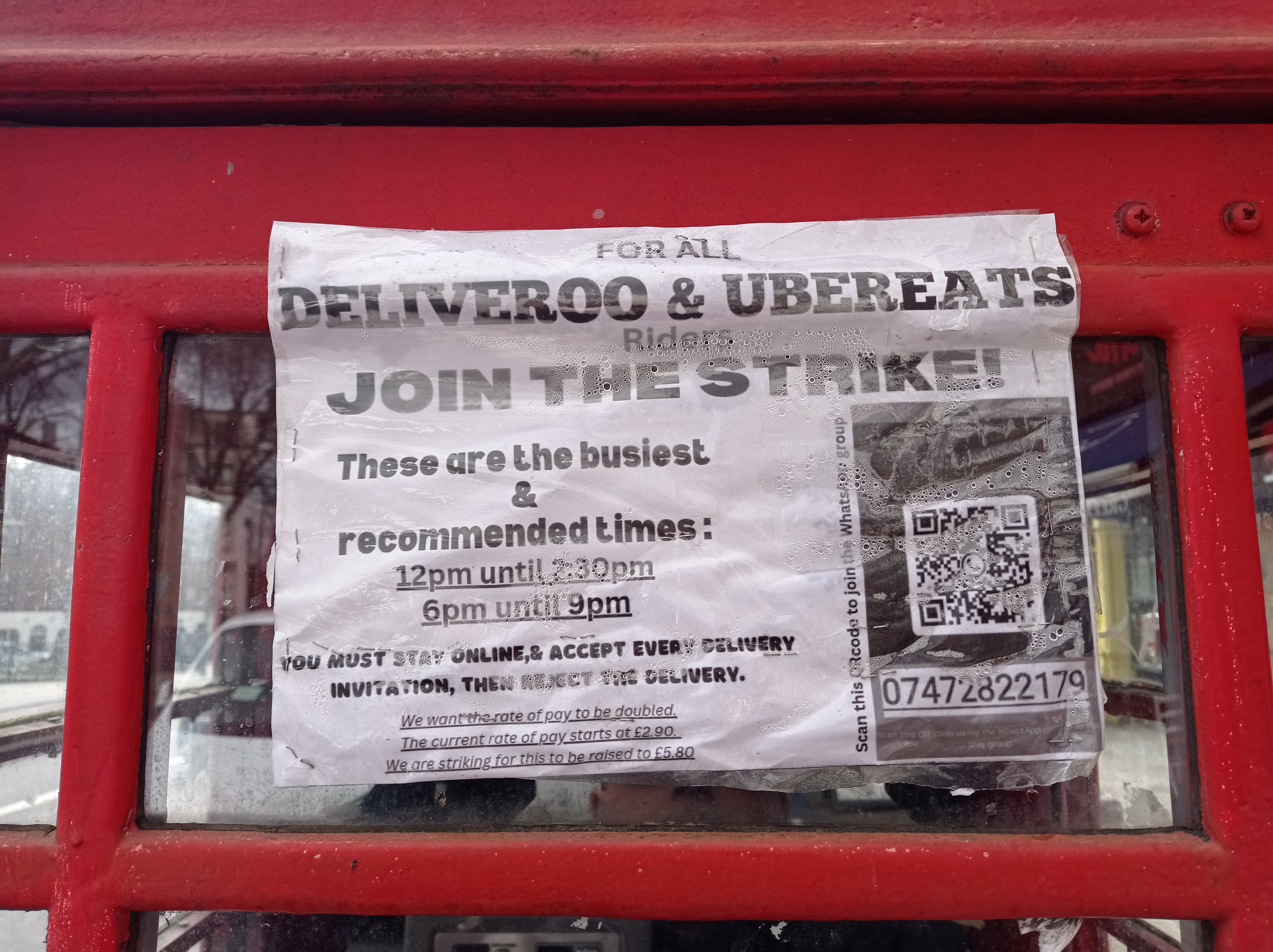
Advertisement for the Deliveroo & Uber Eats strike, London, February 2024

In August 2016, a group of Deliveroo's London drivers held a day-long strike to protest about a new pay plan which they claimed would result in riders earning substantially below the minimum wage, and the continuing lack of sick and accident pay. The company later abandoned these plans.

During these strikes, as a means of protest, London Deliveroo drivers held up signs containing the neologism "Slaveroo". The term and its corresponding social media hashtag were adopted by several news outlets, including non-English international media. In the aftermath of these protests, Mags Dewhurst, chair of the Independent Workers Union of Great Britain (IWGB) Couriers and Logistics Branch, which represents some couriers and delivery drivers in London, published an article in The Guardian backing the protesters, saying that Deliveroo's claims of offering freedom and flexibility, vis-à-vis its couriers, were a sham, calling them "bywords for exploitation and exhaustion".

On 8 November 2016, news headlines covered the demand by a small group of UK Deliveroo drivers for union recognition by the company. The IWGB represented the drivers in the Camden area of north London. In November 2017, the Central Arbitration Committee dismissed the challenge by the IWGB and ruled that Deliveroo riders are self-employed. Deliveroo welcomed the decision as a 'victory for riders [who] value the flexibility that self-employment provides'.

In 2017 and 2018, Dutch online consumer affairs journalist Tim Hofman investigated Deliveroo undercover, asserting that the company forced its delivery staff to declare themselves self-employed rather than being employees of the company, which would give them rights to benefits such as sick pay. The investigation and presentation of the evidence to Deliveroo management was released as episodes of the #BOOS online programme.

In May 2017, Deliveroo workers protested about working conditions in Berlin, Germany. In January 2018, Deliveroo riders went on strike in Belgium and the Netherlands.

In March 2021, local press reported on complaints that Deliveroo riders in Manchester were spotted "allegedly using bushes as ‘public toilets’ while waiting to collect orders."

In April 2021, on the company's trading debut on the London Stock Exchange, a group of Deliveroo's riders in London held a strike protesting about pay and work conditions.

In June 2021, Deliveroo won a court case against the IWGB, which concerned the company's classification of its couriers. While the IWGB argued that Deliveroo couriers should be considered employees and have the right to unionise, Deliveroo classified them as self-employed. The court upheld Deliveroo's definition.

In April 2022, Deliveroo was fined a maximum penalty of €375,000 for abusing the freelance status of its riders in France. The company was obliged to publish the court decision on its French home page for a month.

=== Rider safety ===
In response to the attacks on moped drivers over the summer of 2017, Deliveroo announced a series of measures to help keep riders safe. Among the measures introduced was a new app feature that allows riders to raise security concerns, plus a trial of helmet cameras to allow Deliveroo to gather evidence and to pass on information to the police. The company also hired 50 new staff across the country who have a focus on rider safety.

In December 2017, Deliveroo announced that its riders would have access to the first insurance scheme for food delivery riders in the UK on-demand economy. As well as sickness and accident insurance cover, cyclists will also have access to the first-of-its-kind public liability insurance.

=== Noise ===
In the London Borough of Islington, the local Deliveroo Editions site was the subject of complaints from neighbours, as a result of noise from air conditioning fans at the site as well as from the stream of delivery mopeds circling the site. In response to the complaints, in 2021 the local council issued an enforcement notice to shut down the operation. Deliveroo appealed against the notice and won its appeal in March 2022.

Following on from a meeting with the local elected representative and those of the company, Deliveroo agreed to restrict entry to the site to delivery riders on electric scooters and bicycles, with parking spots allocated for riders on petrol scooters further down the road. Following this controversy, Deliveroo installed recharge terminals at all of their French Editions sites.

=== Safety ===
The company has been criticised for its failure to provide cycle training and safety equipment (such as lights and helmets) to its sometimes inexperienced riders. It has been argued that the need to race against the clock is another reason for couriers' potentially risky cycling behaviour, and that bikes should be checked for safety.

In December 2022, 35-year-old delivery rider Jenniffer Rocha attacked customer Stephen Jenkinson near his home in Aldershot, Hampshire, when she bit off his thumb, following a brief argument over a pizza order. When delivering pizza, Rocha arrived at the wrong location, down the street from Mr Jenkinson's house. When he went to get his food, he forgot his phone and a brief argument ensued about the delivery code number he needed to provide. Rocha pleaded guilty to causing grievous bodily harm, but Jenkinson was unable to claim any compensation, as Rocha had been working as a "substitute" rider using someone else's account.

=== Market departures ===
==== Germany ====
On 12 August 2019, Deliveroo sent an email to German customers as well as to all rider staff, who at this point were still partly self-employed, stating its decision to leave the German market and indicating that all services would stop from 16 August. The email cited its inability to provide a sufficient quality of service, and that it would focus on other markets. The announcement came days after acquiring Scottish startup Cultivate, and three months after raising £450 million in a funding round led by Amazon.

==== Taiwan ====
Deliveroo entered the Taiwan market in October 2018. In Taiwan, Deliveroo relied on contractors, according to an investigation by the Ministry of Labor. As Deliveroo workers in Taiwan were not considered employees, it was unclear if the company was required to provide labor insurance to workers. Despite not having the status of employees, Deliveroo and several courier services in Taiwan were cautioned by the labor ministry in 2019 that the Occupational Safety and Health Act applied to contractors. Therefore, Deliveroo agreed to suspend work for riders when the government suspends work for those with employee status due to natural disasters.

In October 2019, Sharing Economy Association Taiwan proposed safety regulations that were agreed to by several courier services active in Taiwan, including Deliveroo. That same month, Taiwan's Directorate General of Highways (DGH) fined Deliveroo for violations of the Highway Act, as it had not applied for a business license to establish an automobile transportation enterprise. Additionally, the DGH ordered Deliveroo to cease operations. Deliveroo announced its exit from Taiwan in April 2020.

==== Spain ====
In August 2021, Deliveroo announced it would be pulling out of Spain. This followed the Spanish government's decision in March to introduce a law giving gig economy workers employee rights, rather than those of a self-employed contractor. Deliveroo said the law was not the determining factor in its withdrawal from Spain, but had hastened it.

==== Netherlands ====
In October 2022, Deliveroo announced it would be exiting the Netherlands after it became clear that couriers were protected by Dutch law for the plan Deliveroo had to make their employees self-employed instead of employees.

==== Australia ====
In November 2022, Deliveroo announced it would be exiting Australia after entering voluntary administration. The decision came after the company faced financial loss from strong competition, and criticism from some government ministers. The shutdown was with immediate effect, giving riders and restaurants no notice, resulting in immediate unemployment and lost revenue.

==== Hong Kong ====
On 10 March 2025, Deliveroo announced that it would exit the Hong Kong market on 7 April 2025. Numerous assets of the Hong Kong division, including the network and business, was sold to German company Delivery Hero (who owns competitor Foodpanda), with all other assets being liquidated in a voluntary liquidation process. Deliveroo said, after being in the Hong Kong market for 9 years, it still has a negative adjusted earnings before interest, taxes, depreciation and amortization in the market, hence the decision to exit.

==== Singapore ====
On 25 February 2026, Deliveroo announced that it would exit the Singapore market on 4 March 2026.

==== Qatar ====
On 25 February 2026, Deliveroo announced that it would exit the Qatar market on 4 March 2026.

=== IPO ===
In March 2021, the company announced its intention to join the London Stock Exchange with an IPO. In anticipation of the listing then Chancellor of the Exchequer Rishi Sunak stated that ‘Deliveroo has created thousands of jobs and is a true British tech success story,’ and added that ‘it is great news that the next stage of their growth will be on the public markets in the U.K.

It was listed on 31 March at 390 pence per share, but closed 14% lower at 284p by the end of the first day of trading. One of the company's bankers reportedly described it as "the worst IPO in London's history". The company opened its initial public offering to customers, making £50 million worth of shares by registering interest through the Deliveroo app. The company also provided £16 million to riders who have delivered the most orders, with individual payments of up to £10,000.

=== Acquisition by DoorDash (2025) ===
In April 2025, DoorDash, a US food delivery company, made a bid to acquire the company for £2.7 billion, which would value the shares at 180p. In response, Deliveroo's board said "it would be minded to recommend [the bid]... but subject to the agreement of other terms." As a result of the acquisition bid, Deliveroo suspended a £100 million ($133.5 million) share buyback program it had announced on 18 March 2025.

On 6 May 2025, the deal was agreed by the boards of both companies at a valuation of £2.9 billion. The deal is conditional on shareholder and regulatory approval and is expected to be completed between October and December 2025. The proposed deal is likely to be examined closely by the Competition and Markets Authority, which blocked a previous attempt by an American company (Amazon) to take a stake in Deliveroo.

In August, it was announced that the proposed takeover would be assessed under the European Union's simplified merger procedure, indicating that the EU regulator did not anticipate any competition issues and that approval was likely. The transaction was approved by the court on the 30 September 2025, allowing it to be completed in October; and the purchase was completed on October 2, 2025.

== Praise ==
In a 2016 study of the sharing economy, PwC described Deliveroo as "one of the sharing economy's quickest-growing stars". TechCrunch awarded Deliveroo 'Best Startup Founders' in the Europas Awards 2016, and praised founders Will Shu and Greg Orlowski. In November 2016, Management Today said that Deliveroo had become 'one of the best' in the food delivery sector due to providing a network of dedicated couriers and an ordering platform which enabled restaurants to offer delivery.

== Partnerships and charity ==
In July 2020, Deliveroo partnered with the NSPCC to train couriers to spot and report signs of child abuse. More than 7,000 riders completed the training.

In May 2021, Deliveroo announced a partnership with some grocery partners to distribute one million meals to those in need in the UK. The campaign was fronted by television and radio presenter Maya Jama.

In June 2021, Deliveroo announced a partnership with Neighbourhood Watch giving couriers the option to train to help spot the signs of crimes ranging from sexual harassment to domestic abuse and drug dealing.

== See also ==
- Cyclologistics

== Bibliography ==
- E McGaughey, 'Uber, the Taylor Review, and the duty to not misrepresent employment status' (2018) Industrial Law Journal
- E McGaughey, 'Taylorooism: When Network Technology Meets Corporate Power' (2018) Industrial Relations Journal
