= Stanley Tang =

Co-founder of DoorDash (born 1992)

- Born: 1992 (age 33–34); Sendai, Japan
- Education: Stanford University (BS)
- Known for: Co-founding DoorDash

Stanley Wei Rui Tang (simplified Chinese: 汤玮锐; traditional Chinese: 湯瑋銳; pinyin: Tāng Wěi Ruì, born 1992) is a Hong Kong-American billionaire tech entrepreneur. He is best known as the Co-Founder and Chief Product Officer at DoorDash, which he started along with Tony Xu, Andy Fang and Evan Moore in 2013.

DoorDash had its IPO in December 2020, making Tang's net worth an estimated $2.2 billion at the time.

== Personal life ==
Tang was born in Japan and grew up in Hong Kong and has a Bachelor of Science degree in Computer Science from Stanford University.

In 2023, he married Gloria Zhu, whom he met in San Francisco in 2015.
