= David Vélez =

Colombian businessman (born 1981)

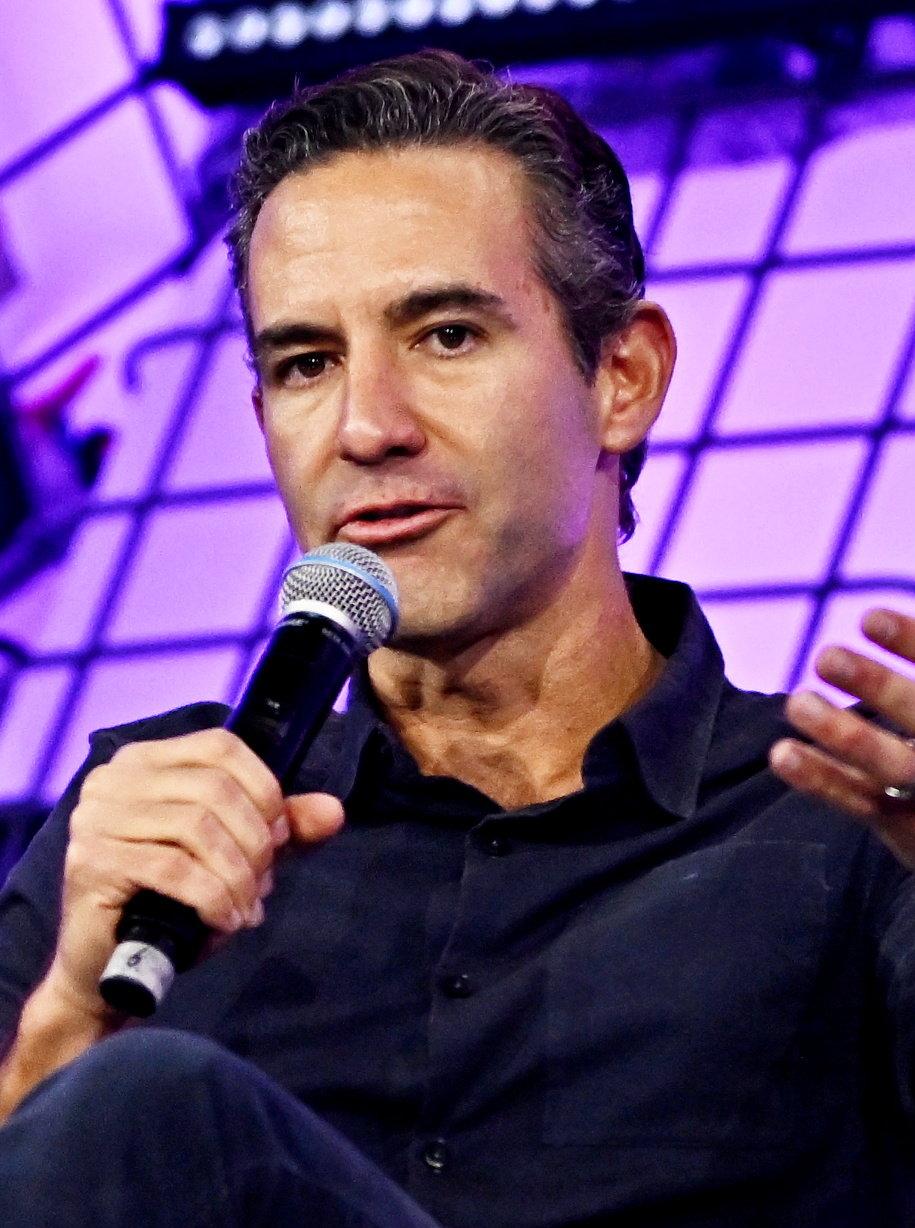
- Vélez in 2023 at the Web Summit in Rio de Janeiro
- Born: 1981 (age 44–45); Medellín, Colombia
- Citizenship: Colombia; Costa Rica
- Education: Stanford University
- Occupation: Banker
- Known for: Founder and CEO of Nubank

David Vélez (born 1981) is a Colombian banker, engineer and entrepreneur. He is the founder, chief executive officer and chairman of the Brazilian neobank Nubank.

In the Forbes 2025 list, he was ranked 236th worldwide with an estimated net worth of US$10.7 billion.

== Early life and education ==
Vélez was born in Medellín in 1981,

Vélez earned admission to Stanford University in the United States, where he completed a Bachelor's degree in Management Science & Engineering, followed by an MBA at Stanford Graduate School of Business, graduating in 2012.

== Career ==
After Stanford, Vélez embarked on a career in finance. He worked in investment banking at Morgan Stanley and Goldman Sachs, gaining experience on Wall Street. He then transitioned into growth equity and venture capital, joining General Atlantic and later becoming a partner at Sequoia Capital. In 2011, Sequoia tasked him with establishing the firm's presence in Brazil. However, Sequoia's plan to expand in Brazil was shelved shortly (in part due to a shortage of local software engineers at the time).

=== Nubank ===
Sensing an opportunity in Brazil's banking sector, which was dominated by a few large banks charging high fees, David Vélez decided to build a new kind of online bank. In 2013, at age 31, he co-founded Nubank in São Paulo along with Brazilian co-founder Cristina Junqueira and American co-founder Edward Wible. Vélez's motivation came from personal experience: as a foreigner in Brazil he found opening a bank account to be overly bureaucratic and expensive, convincing him that technology could make banking far more accessible. Nubank launched with a no-fee credit card managed via a mobile app, targeting consumers fed up with poor service and high costs at traditional banks.

The company started with him and his employees as the first customers. The startup went on to receive investments from Sequoia and Khosla Ventures.

By 2019 the startup had over 12 million customers in Brazil. It expanded to Mexico and Colombia in the following years, offering not just credit cards but also digital bank accounts, personal loans, insurance, and other financial products. In December 2021, Vélez led Nubank through a highly successful IPO (via holding company Nu Holdings) on the New York Stock Exchange, which valued the company at about $45 billion on its first trading day. This IPO made Nubank one of the most valuable financial institutions in Latin America.

As of 2024, Nubank has become a leading digital bank in Latin America, serving over 100 million customers across Brazil, Mexico, and Colombia.

== Net worth ==
After Nubank's successful IPO in December 2021, Vélez became the richest person in Colombia, surpassing longtime leader Luis Carlos Sarmiento in Forbes' rankings. In the Forbes 2025 list, he was ranked 236th worldwide with an estimated net worth of US$10.7 billion.

In August 2024, Vélez sold approximately 31 million shares of Nu Holdings Inc. (the parent company of Nubank) valued at about US $404 million. He remains a shareholder with an approximately 20 percent stake. In January 2025, Vélez stated that Nubank is exploring expansion beyond Latin America, including a possible entry into the United States.

== Personal life ==
Vélez is married to Mariel Reyes Milk, a Peruvian-American entrepreneur. The couple has four children, the youngest born in 2022.

In August 2021, he and his wife signed the Giving Pledge, committing to donate the majority of their wealth to charitable causes during their lifetime. In 2022, the couple launched VelezReyes+, a philanthropic platform supporting the education, entrepreneurship, and social-impact projects across Latin America.

== Awards ==
In September 2024, the Congress of the Republic of Colombia honored him with the Simón Bolívar Order of Democracy, conferred at the rank of Grand Knight, in recognition of his entrepreneurial achievements.
