= Lendable =

British financial technology company

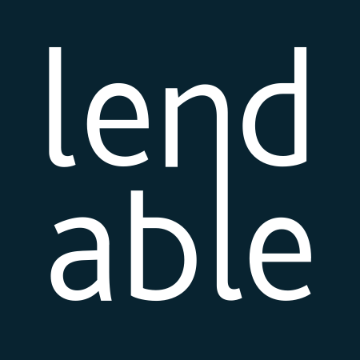
- Type: Private
- Industry: Financial technology
- Founded: 2014; 12 years ago
- Founders: Martin Kissinger; Victoria van Lennep; Paul Pamment; Jakob Schwarz
- Headquarters: London, England, United Kingdom
- Area served: United Kingdom; United States; Mexico
- Key people: Martin Kissinger (CEO)
- Products: Personal loans, credit cards, and car finance
- Revenue: ▲£446 million (2025)
- Operating income: ▲£114 million (2025)
- Website: lendable.com

Lendable is a British financial technology company headquartered in London.

== History ==
Lendable was founded in 2014 by Martin Kissinger, Victoria van Lennep, Paul Pamment, and Jakob Schwarz. It received £2.5 million in seed financing from a group of angel investors, including Passion Capital. Lendable was conceived as a lending platform that raised capital from institutional investors and undercut traditional banks on speed and cost by automating credit decisions and the borrowing process. The company turned profitable in 2017.

In March 2017, Lendable raised £100 million from Waterfall Asset Management. A year later, it secured a £200 million funding commitment from Goldman Sachs for platform-originated loans.

In 2019, Lendable was listed as one of the fastest-growing UK companies on The Sunday Times Tech Track 100 and Deloitte Fast 50 lists, and again in 2020. In early 2021, following a secondary share sale, Lendable became a unicorn and was valued at above £1 billion. In March 2022, the Ontario Teachers' Pension Plan Board, through its Teachers’ Innovation Platform, led a £210 million funding round that set Lendable’s valuation at about £3.5 billion. Balderton Capital also participated in the funding round.

Lendable also operates Zable, a credit card, and Autolend, a car finance product launched in 2021. That same year, Lendable expanded to the United States, offering personal loans and credit cards under the Zable brand.

By 2025, Lendable had become one of the largest consumer finance providers in the UK. According to Experian data, it was the UK's biggest issuer of personal loans by volume, and second-largest issuer of credit cards in 2025. In October 2025, Lendable announced its partnership with Gigs to launch Zable Mobile, making it the first mobile plan by a fintech in Britain. In 2026, Lendable expanded its operations to Mexico.

== Platform ==
Lendable operates an online lending platform that uses artificial intelligence (AI) to automate credit decisions. Its business model is a two-sided marketplace: Lendable originates and services the loans on behalf of institutional investors, such as hedge funds and pension funds, rather than relying on its own balance sheet. Investors receive the interest payments while Lendable charges a fee to use the platform.

In the UK, Lendable provides loans up to £35,000 over a term of up to eight years to prime and near-prime users. It uses the UK open banking system to approve loans and, once approved, disburses funds immediately. It is the loans provider behind Asda Money and the Post Office.
