= Nubank =

Brazilian financial technology company

Nu Holdings Ltd.
- Type: Public
- Traded as: NYSE: NU (Class A); B3: ROXO34; Russell 1000 component
- Industry: Financial services
- Founded: 6 May 2013; 13 years ago
- Founders: David Vélez; Edward Wible; Cristina Junqueira
- Headquarters: São Paulo, Brazil
- Area served: Americas
- Key people: David Vélez (CEO)
- Products: Credit card; Cashback reward program; Digital bank account; Personal loans
- Revenue: ▲US$16.3 billion (2025)
- Net income: ▲US$2.87 billion (2025)
- Total assets: ▲US$74.89 billion (2025)
- Total equity: ▲US$11.3 billion (2025)
- Number of employees: 10,027 (2025)
- Website: nu.com

Nubank, doing business outside of Brazil as Nu, is a Brazilian neobank headquartered in São Paulo, Brazil. Although it is not formally part of Brazil’s National Financial System (Sistema Financeiro Nacional), Nubank operates as a financial and payment institution regulated and supervised by the Central Bank of Brazil. It is the largest fintech bank in Latin America. As of September 2026, it had 143 million customers across Brazil, Mexico and Colombia. Its revenue was $16 billion in 2025. At its initial public offering in December 2021, Nubank was valued at $45 billion.

== History ==
Nubank was founded in 2013 by Colombian David Vélez to disrupt the banking industry in Brazil. After developing a business plan, Vélez raised a seed round from Sequoia Capital with the intention of launching a credit card company that would expand into other financial services. On advice from his investors, he recruited Brazilian Cristina Junqueira and American Edward Wible. In 2018, Nubank became a unicorn startup with its valuation of US$1 billion.

In the company's first two years of existence, it raised 600 million Brazilian reais and an additional $14.3 million from Sequoia Capital, along with Kaszek Ventures and Nicolas Berggruen. Nubank launched its first financial product, an international Mastercard credit card without annual fees that can be completely managed through a mobile app. The first transaction with a Nubank card was made on April 1, 2014. In June 2015, Tiger Global Management led Nubank's Series B, along with existing backers Sequoia Capital, Kaszek Ventures and QED Investors.

In 2017, Nubank launched its loyalty program, Nubank Rewards. The program's points can be redeemed for a product catalogue or discounts on services, travel and entertainment. Customers can try the program for free for 30 days, after which they will be charged a fee in order to further use it. In the same year, it also launched its digital account, NuConta.

In October 2018, Tencent bought a minority stake of Nubank worth $180 million ($90 million in capital increase, $90 million in shares). In late 2018, it began offering payments through debit. In 2018, after launching its new credit card design, Nubank was featured in the Guinness Book of Records for making the world's largest unboxing. In early 2019, the fintech started testing personal loans with a few of its digital account users. In May 2019, the company announced it would begin operations in Mexico through a subsidiary called Nu. This was the first time Nubank offered its services and products outside of Brazil.

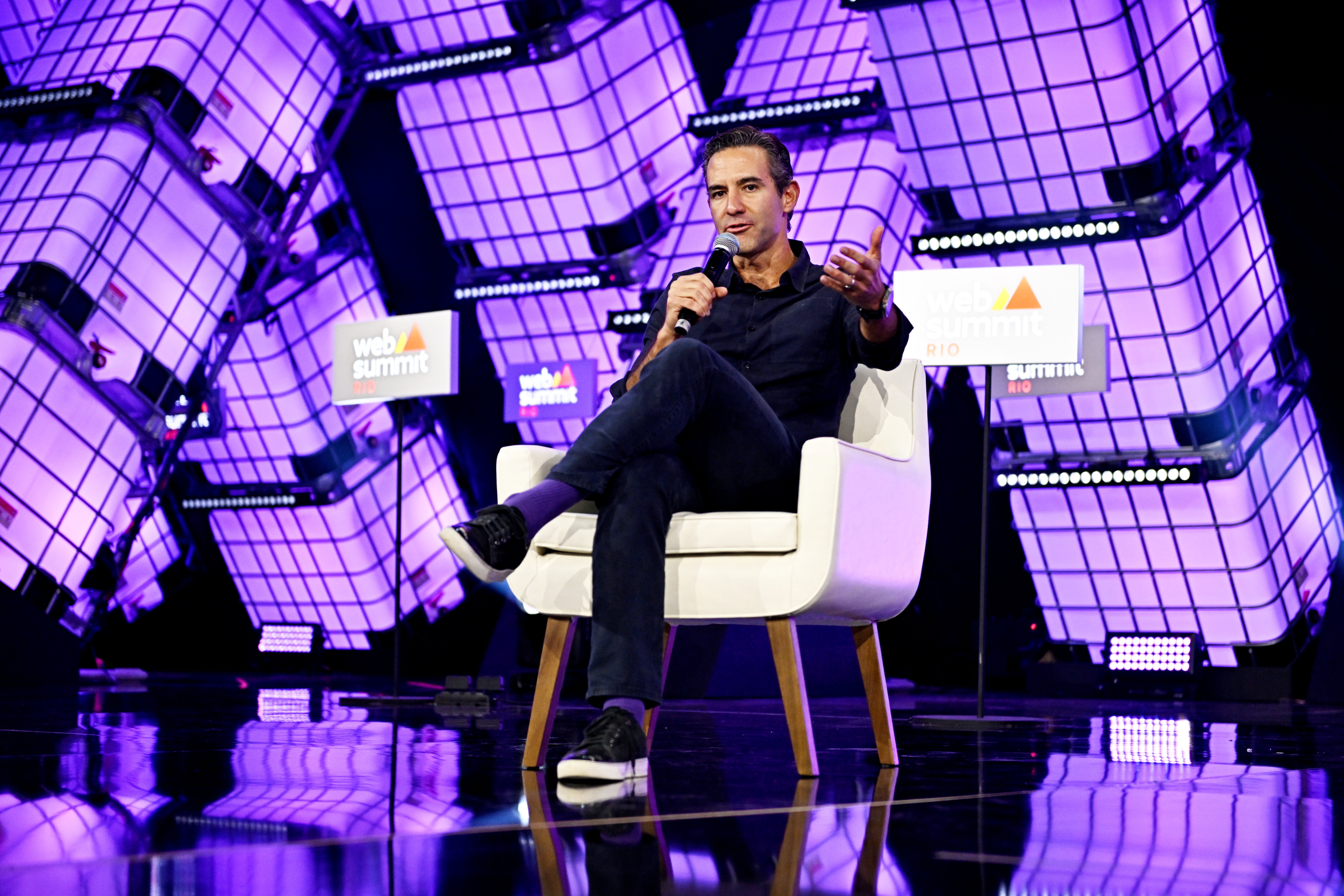
The CEO of Nubank, David Vélez, representing the company in 2023

In January 2020, Nubank made its first acquisition with the purchase of Plataformatec, a company that specialized in software engineering and agile methodologies. In July of the same year, the company also acquired Cognitect, responsible for Datomic and the Clojure programming language. In September 2020, Nubank acquired Easynvest, an investment broker also from Brazil, for an undisclosed amount.

In November 2020, Nubank announced that the company would begin operations in Colombia. In April 2021, Edward Wible, who was CTO of the company for eight years, left his position "to contribute more directly to the construction of the systems and infrastructure of the company" as the Director of Technological Platforms.

The bank completed an IPO in December 2021. After the IPO, Nubank's cofounder Cristina Junqueira became the second woman in Brazil to reach the self-made billionaire status, since she held 2.9% stake of company stock ($1.3 billion). Before and after the IPO, Berkshire Hathaway invested a total of $1 billion in Nubank stock. In 2022, Forbes ranked Nubank #1 out of the fifteen best Brazilian banks. In October 2023, it was announced that the bank would use generative AI to offer credit to customers. It was announced that the AI would function as a virtual assistant that would also give tips on how to use a credit card. It was developed using OpenAI's GPT-4 and other bank intelligence systems.

Also in October 2023, the bank announced that it had requested, through its subsidiary Nu México, a license to operate as a bank in Mexico, with the aim of increasing its portfolio in the country. It also began the gradual offer of payroll loans for INSS retirees and pensioners. In May 2024, Nubank announced their own travel eSIM in partnership with Gigs.

In March 2025, Nubank partnered with OpenAI to accelerate productivity with custom enterprise search, giving employees quick access to FAQs, brand guidelines, and internal policies. They were also reported to improve customer service experience by using GPT-4o to help agents answer customer queries. Following a late 2025 application to the Office of the Comptroller of the Currency (OCC), Nubank was granted conditional approval to establish a national banking presence in the US in January 2026.

On March 4, 2026, Nu, and Inter Miami CF announced a multiyear partnership establishing Nu as a Main Partner of Inter Miami CF. It was also announced that Inter Miami CF’s new home stadium at Miami Freedom Park will officially be named Nu Stadium.

In July 2026, Nu México received authorization from Mexico's National Banking and Securities Commission to begin operating as a bank. After completing its transition from a popular financial society (SOFIPO), it began operating as a bank on August 6, 2026.

On 10 September 2026, Nubank officially launched its operations in the United States, entering the market through a partnership with Kansas City-based Lead Bank.

== Description ==
Among the company's products are NuConta (a digital account), an international credit card, both without fees, personal loans, life insurance and investments. The company's differentiating factor is to offer a credit card which is controlled completely through the means of a mobile app. The app allows its users to track transactions in real time, block their respective credit card, apply for a limit raise and contact customer support.

Some of Nubank's investors are Sequoia Capital, Founders Fund, Kaszek Ventures, Tiger Global Management, Goldman Sachs, Berkshire Hathaway, QED Investors and DST Global.

== Finances ==
	2018	2019	2020	2021	2022	2023	2024	2025
Total revenue (USD bn)	0.2	0.3	0.5	0.9	1.8	3.7	5.5	7.0
Net profit (USD bn)	0.0	-0.1	-0.2	-0.2	-0.4	1.0	2.0	2.9
Total Deposits (USD bn)	0.6	2.7	5.6	9.7	15.8	23.7	28.9	41.9
Total assets (USD bn)	2.8	6.8	10.2	19.9	29.9	43.4	49.9	74.9
Total equity (USD bn)	0.3	0.6	0.4	4.4	4.9	6.4	7.7	11.3
