= Will Shu =

UK-based American businessman

- 許子祥
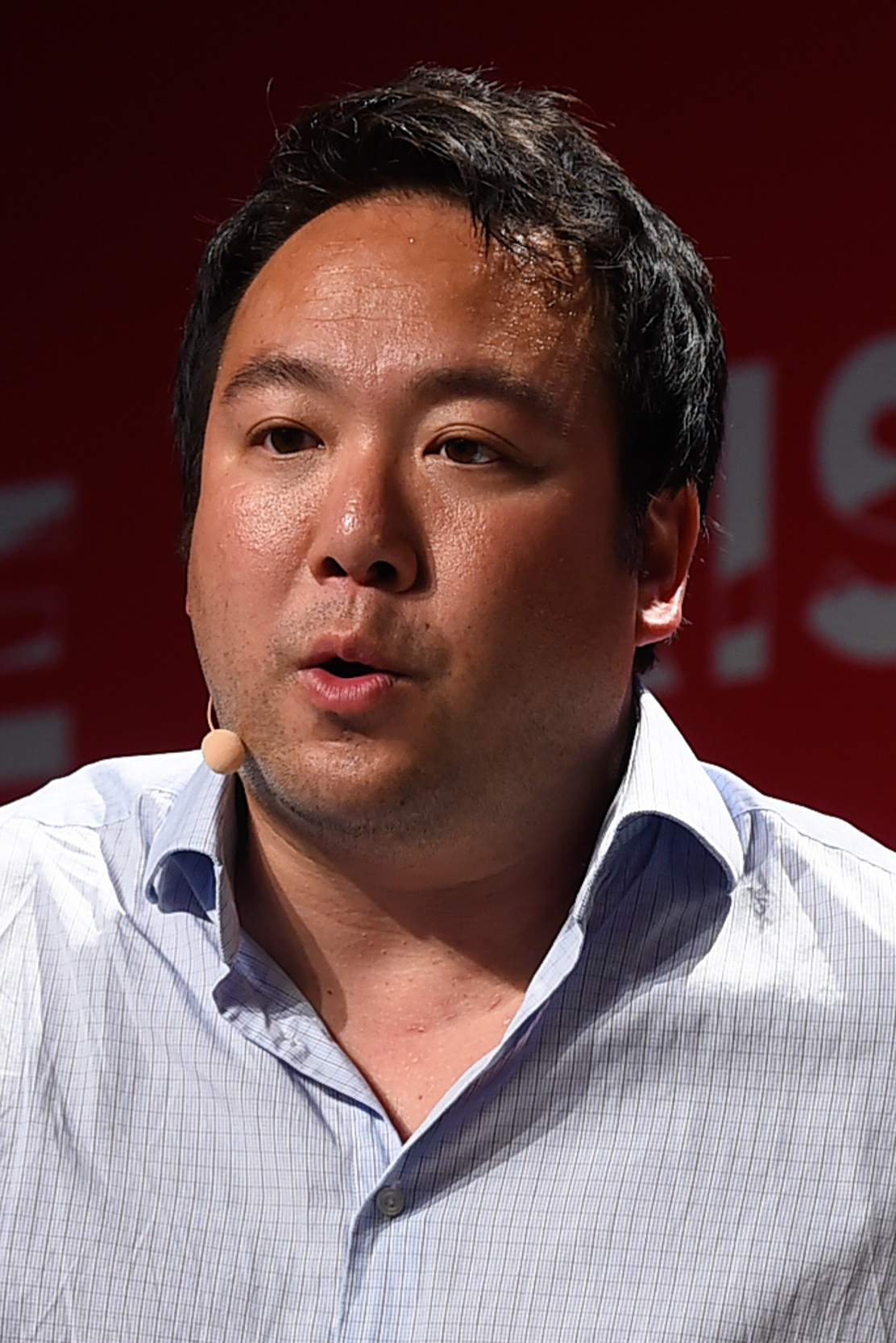
- Shu in 2016
- Born: William Shu; December 1979 (age 46); Connecticut, U.S.
- Education: Northwestern University (BA); University of Pennsylvania (MBA)
- Known for: Co-founder and CEO, Deliveroo

Chinese name
- Traditional Chinese: 許子祥
- Simplified Chinese: 许子祥
Transcriptions
Standard Mandarin
- Hanyu Pinyin: Xǔ Zǐxiáng
Southern Min
- Hokkien POJ: Khó͘ Chú-siông
- Tâi-lô: Khóo Tsú-siông

William Shu (Chinese: 許子祥; Pe̍h-ōe-jī: Khó͘ Chú-siông, born December 1979) is an American-British businessman, the co-founder and chief executive of Deliveroo, an online food delivery company with operations spread across more than 200 cities in 11 countries.

== Early life and education ==
He was born in December 1979 in Connecticut to Taiwanese American parents. In 2001, Shu earned a bachelor's degree from Northwestern University. His first job was with Morgan Stanley in London as an investment banking analyst in 2001. Shu returned to the United States in 2010 to attend business school and earned a Master of Business Administration from the Wharton School of the University of Pennsylvania in 2012.

== Career ==
Before founding Deliveroo, Shu worked as an analyst for S.A.C. Capital Advisors and ESO Capital, and as an investment banker at Morgan Stanley. He co-founded Deliveroo in 2013 with childhood friend and software engineer Greg Orlowski. Shu had the idea to start Deliveroo while working in Morgan Stanley's London office and seeing the lack of delivery options while working late nights. Shu worked as the company's first delivery person, delivering food every day for the first eight months in order to understand the customer experience.

Deliveroo operated in London for the first two years, growing via word of mouth. In 2015, the company expanded internationally to Paris, Berlin and Dublin. Deliveroo reached a valuation of more than £1.5 billion in November 2017, operating in 12 countries and more than 150 cities.

In February 2016, Orlowski, who had been working as Deliveroo's chief technology officer, left "to spend more time with his wife in Chicago after the birth of their daughter".

Shu continues to work shifts as a Deliveroo driver, delivering food around London every few weeks.

== Controversy ==
Shu received criticism for raising his own salary to £125,000 a year, a 22.5 per cent increase, amidst a dispute over riders' status and company losses in 2016. Administrative expenses, such as hiring new staff and a new London office, multiplied from £28.8 million to £142.2 million, resulting in a large loss. In addition, Shu gave nearly £4.5 million in share bonuses to directors and hundreds of other head office staff.

Deliveroo was one of many gig workers companies facing legal challenges over the employment model of its delivery riders. Four court judgements, most recently a Court of Appeal's judgement in 2021, confirmed that Deliveroo's riders are self-employed independent contractors.

== Personal life ==
Shu lives in London.
