= Wolt =

Finnish online food delivery service

Wolt Enterprises Oy
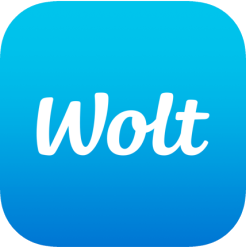
- Trade name: Wolt
- Type: Private
- Founded: October 6, 2014; 12 years ago in Helsinki, Finland
- Founders: Miki Kuusi; Elias Aalto; Mika Matikainen; Oskari Pétas; Lauri Andler; Juhani Mykkänen
- Headquarters: Finland
- Area served: List: Albania; Austria; Azerbaijan; Bulgaria; Croatia; Cyprus; Czech Republic; Denmark; Estonia; Finland; Georgia; Germany; Greece; Hungary; Iceland; Israel; Kazakhstan; Kosovo; Latvia; Lithuania; Luxembourg; Malta; North Macedonia; Norway; Poland; Romania; Serbia; Slovakia; Slovenia; Sweden
- Parent: DoorDash
- Website: wolt.com/en/

Wolt Enterprises Oy, trading as Wolt, is a Finnish food delivery company known for its delivery platform for food and merchandise. On Wolt's apps (iOS and Android) or website, customers can order food and household goods from the platform's restaurant and merchant partners, and either pick up their order or have it delivered by the platform's courier partners. Wolt also runs its own chain of grocery stores called Wolt Market. Wolt is headquartered in Helsinki.

In May 2022, Wolt was acquired by the American food delivery company DoorDash. Wolt continues to operate as a sub-brand of DoorDash in Europe and Asia, while DoorDash uses its own branding in North America and Australasia.

DoorDash brand operations by country: DoorDash Deliveroo Wolt

== History ==
Wolt was founded in 2014 by 6 founders, including Miki Kuusi, the former CEO of Slush and CEO of Wolt. Kuusi has been responsible for DoorDash's business outside the US since May 2022, when DoorDash acquired Wolt.

Countries where Wolt operates in (blue)

As of May 2023, Wolt operates in 25 countries and over 300 cities, including Helsinki, Tokyo, and Berlin. Wolt has over 70,000 merchant partners, 150,000 courier partners and 20 million registered customers. Wolt has over 7,000 employees across its offices in 25 countries.

In November 2021, it was announced that Wolt was being merged into DoorDash through an exchange of shares, giving Wolt shareholders a minority of shares in DoorDash for a deal worth US $8.1 billion. On 31 May 2022, the acquisition was completed.

Before the DoorDash acquisition, Wolt raised $856M in funding from investors including ICONIQ Capital, Highland Europe, 83North, EQT Ventures, Tiger Global, DST Global, Prosus, KKR, Coatue, Inventure, Lifeline Ventures, Supercell founder & CEO Ilkka Paananen and Nokia Chairman Risto Siilasmaa, among others.

Wolt was ranked second in the 2020 edition of the FT:1000 Europe's Fastest Growing Companies 2020 published by the Financial Times.

In October 2024, Wolt announced the acquisition of Tazz, a Romanian food delivery platform previously owned by eMAG. The deal was finalized in early 2025 and allowed Wolt to expand its presence in Romania, integrating Tazz’s operations and network into its own platform.

In June 2025, Wolt launched international campaign across 25 countries with popular membership program Wolt+, also featuring actor Owen Wilson as its first-ever brand ambassador.

In October 2025 Miki Kuusi stepped down as CEO of Wolt, and became CEO of Deliveroo, which is also owned by DoorDash.

In February 2026, the American food delivery company DoorDash announced that its subsidiary Wolt would cease operations in Japan and Uzbekistan, while its sister company Deliveroo would withdraw from Qatar and Singapore.

== Timeline ==
- 2014: Wolt was founded in Helsinki, Finland.
- 2015: Wolt first launched in Helsinki as pick-up only.
- 2016: Wolt added delivery to the platform and expanded to Sweden and Estonia. Wolt did some experimenting with self-driving delivery robots in Tallinn in cooperation with Starship Technologies.
- 2017: Wolt launched in Denmark, Latvia and Lithuania.
- 2018: Wolt launched in Croatia, Czech Republic, Norway, Hungary, Georgia, Israel and Poland.
- 2019: Wolt launched in Serbia, Greece, Azerbaijan, Slovakia, Slovenia and Kazakhstan.
- 2020: Wolt launched in Japan, Cyprus, Malta and Germany. Wolt’s own chain of grocery stores, Wolt Market, was launched in Helsinki.
- 2022: The transaction closed and Wolt was acquired by DoorDash.
- 2023: Wolt launched in Austria and Iceland.
- 2024: Wolt launched in Luxembourg, Albania and Uzbekistan.
- 2025: Wolt launched in Kosovo, North Macedonia, Romania and Bulgaria.
- 2026: Wolt pulls out of Japan and Uzbekistan.

== Drivers ==
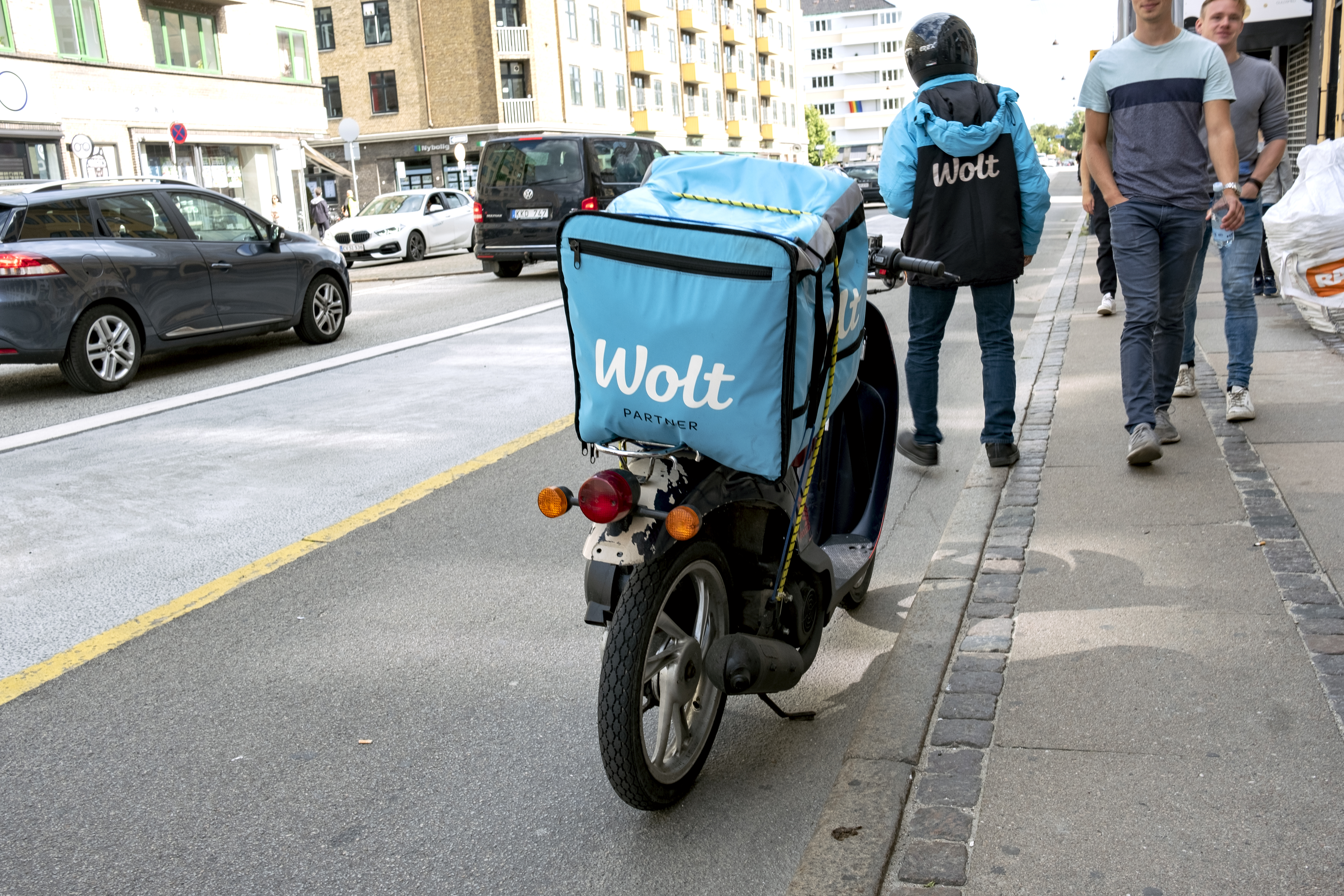
Wolt driver in Copenhagen, Denmark (2021)

Wolt delivery drivers do not work for the company (except in Germany and Denmark) and participate in Gig work. As self-employed, couriers must pay all the incidental costs of their work, such as pension contributions, social security and tooling costs, out of the salary they receive. Their pension and sickness cover in Finland is typically provided through the YEL insurance (Entrepreneur's Pension Insurance), possible after 4 months, and obligatory by Finnish law after 6 months, if yearly YEL income is at least EUR 8,575.45. For example, when using a car, petrol, insurance and other costs are borne by the entrepreneur. As self-employed persons, couriers do not receive paid holidays. According to Wolt, about a third of the couriers are full-time. About a quarter are students. There is a significant proportion of immigrants in Helsinki, for example.

== Criticism ==
- The German Hotel and Restaurant Association DEHOGA recommends that restaurants in Germany should not participate in delivery services which, like Wolt, "intervene in the restaurants' own pricing policy" by "taking a provision of 30%". A self-organized delivery, DEHOGA says, would be a better option if possible. They also see it as dangerous that in the long run, through gaining all delivery data, these services may build up competing kitchens, serving the most-wanted dishes and leaving the restaurants empty-handed, which some services already do.
- In Israel, the Knesset Economic Committee convened for discussing the Wolt's new steps, during which the restaurateurs demanded the intervention of the Competition Authority, due to the new fee and the fare increasing. Wolt charged an additional 5% of the order as "operating fees" besides the delivery fee which was 14 ILS (4 USD). The committee requested the Competition Authority to formulate an action plan within a week.
- In Denmark, Wolt has often been in conflict with and faced criticism from Danmarks Restauranter & Caféer. Couriers in Denmark have also held demonstrations in Copenhagen, stating fallen wages, but Wolt denies it

== See also ==
- Cyclologistics
