= Startup company =

New company developing a novel, scalable business

A startup or start-up is a company or project typically undertaken by an entrepreneur to seek, develop, and validate a scalable business model. While entrepreneurship includes all new businesses including self-employment and businesses that do not intend to go public, startups are new businesses that intend to grow large beyond the solo-founder. At the early stages, startups face significant uncertainty and high rates of failure. However, a minority achieve notable success and influence, with some growing into unicorns, private companies valued at over US$1 billion. Startups are typically characterized by an innovative stance, a potential for rapid growth, external funding, and vulnerability.

== Actions ==
Startups typically begin with a founder or co-founders who have a way to solve a problem. The founder of a startup will conduct market validation through problem interviews, solution interviews, and the building of a minimum viable product (MVP), i.e. a prototype, to develop and validate their business model. The startup process can take a long time; hence, sustained effort is required. Over the long term, sustaining effort is especially challenging because of high failure rates and uncertain outcomes. Having a business plan in place outlines what to do and how to plan and achieve an idea in the future. Typically, these plans outline the first three to five years of the business strategy.

=== Design principles ===
Models for startup ventures are usually associated with design science. Design science uses a set of principles to design and construct the company's backbone. For example, one of the initial design principles is affordable loss.

=== Heuristics and biases in startup actions ===
Because of the lack of information, high uncertainty, and the need to make decisions quickly, founders generally use many heuristics and exhibit biases in their leadership decisions.

Entrepreneurs often become overconfident about their startups and their influence on an outcome (case of the illusion of control). Below are some of the most critical decision biases of entrepreneurs to start up a new business.

1. Overconfidence: Perceive a subjective certainty higher than the objective accuracy. The gap often leads individuals to overestimate their understanding of complex situations, resulting in decisions that are based more on subjective certainty than on objective facts or accurate information
2. Illusion of control: Overemphasize how much skills, instead of chance, improve performance.
3. The law of small numbers: Reach conclusions about a larger population using a limited sample.
4. Availability bias: Make judgments about the probability of events based on how easy it is to think of examples.
5. Escalation of commitment: Persist unduly with unsuccessful initiatives or courses of action.

Startups use several action principles to generate evidence as quickly as possible to reduce the downside effect of decision biases such as an escalation of commitment, overconfidence, and the illusion of control.

=== Mentoring ===
Many entrepreneurs seek feedback from mentors in creating their startups. Mentors guide founders and impart entrepreneurial skills and may increase the self-efficacy of nascent entrepreneurs. Mentoring offers direction for entrepreneurs to enhance their knowledge of how to sustain their assets relating to their status and identity and strengthen their real-time skills.

== Principles ==
There are many principles in creating a startup. Some of the principles needed are listed below:

=== Lean startup ===
Lean startup is a clear set of principles to create and design startups under limited resources and tremendous uncertainty to build their ventures more flexibly and at a lower cost. It is based on the idea that entrepreneurs can make their implicit assumptions about how their venture works explicit and empirically testing it. The empirical test is to de/validate these assumptions and to get an engaged understanding of the business model of the new ventures, and in doing so, the new ventures are created iteratively in a build–measure–learn loop. Hence, lean startup is a set of principles for entrepreneurial learning and business model design. More precisely, it is a set of design principles aimed for iteratively experiential learning under uncertainty in an engaged empirical manner. Typically, a lean startup focuses on a few lean principles:

- find a problem worth solving, then define a solution
- engage early adopters for market validation
- continually test with smaller, faster iterations
- build a function, measure customer response, and verify/refute the idea
- evidence-based decisions on when to pivot by changing your plan's course
- maximize the efforts for speed, learning, and focus

=== Market validation ===
A key principle of startup is to validate the market need before providing a customer-centric product or service to avoid business ideas with weak demand. Market validation can be done in a number of ways, including surveys, cold calling, email responses, word of mouth or through sample research.

=== Design thinking ===
Design thinking is a human-centered approach to problem-solving that emphasizes empathy, collaboration, and experimentation. It is widely used to deeply understand customers' needs, behaviors, and pain points through immersive engagement and iterative feedback. By placing users at the center of the innovation process, design thinking seeks to uncover insights that can lead to more effective, relevant, and impactful solutions.

However, while design thinking—and its complementary methodology, customer development—aim to reduce assumptions and promote evidence-based innovation, they are not immune to cognitive biases. In fact, both processes can inadvertently reinforce existing biases at multiple stages. For instance, the way problems are framed, the sources of information selected, the questions posed during interviews, and the interpretation of qualitative data can all be influenced by the facilitator’s or team’s preconceived notions.

These biases can subtly shape what is observed and how it is understood, potentially leading to solutions that reflect the designers' perspectives more than the users’. As a result, the promise of achieving "customer empathy" can be compromised if critical reflection and bias-checking mechanisms are not embedded throughout the process. Therefore, while design thinking is a powerful tool for innovation, its effectiveness depends heavily on the rigor, objectivity, and self-awareness of the individuals applying it. Encouraging people to consider the opposite of whatever decision they are about to make tends to reduce biases such as overconfidence, the hindsight bias, and anchoring.

=== Decision-making under uncertainty ===
In startups, many decisions are made under uncertainty, and hence a key principle for startups is to be agile and flexible. Founders can embed options to design startups in flexible manners, so that the startups can change easily in future.

Uncertainty can vary within-person (I feel more uncertain this year than last year) and between-person (he feels more uncertain than she does). A study found that when entrepreneurs feel more uncertain, they identify more opportunities (within-person difference), but entrepreneurs who perceive more uncertainties than others do not identify more opportunities than others do (no between-person difference).

=== Partnering ===
Startups may form partnerships with other firms to enable their business model to operate. To become attractive to other businesses, startups need to align their internal features, such as management style and products with the market situation. In their 2013 study, Kask and Linton develop two ideal profiles, or also known as configurations or archetypes, for startups that are commercializing inventions. The inheritor profile calls for a management style that is not too entrepreneurial (more conservative) and the startup should have an incremental invention (building on a previous standard). This profile is set out to be more successful (in finding a business partner) in a market with a dominant design (a clear standard is applied in this market). In contrast to this, profile is the originator which has a management style that is highly entrepreneurial and in which a radical invention or a disruptive innovation (totally new standard) is being developed. This profile is set out to be more successful (in finding a business partner) in a market that does not have a dominant design (established standard). New startups should align themselves to one of the profiles when commercializing an invention to be able to find and be attractive to a business partner. By finding a business partner, a startup has greater chances of success.

Startups usually need many different partners to realize their business idea. The commercialization process is often a bumpy road with iterations and new insights during the process. Hasche and Linton argue that startups can learn from their relationships with other firms, and even if the relationship ends, the startup will have gained valuable knowledge about how it should move on going forward. When a relationship is failing for a startup it needs to make changes. Three types of changes can be identified according to Hasche and Linton:

- Change of business concept for the start up
- Change of collaboration constellation (change several relationships)
- Change of characteristic of business relationship (with the partner, e.g. from a transactional relationship to more of a collaborative type of relationship)

=== Entrepreneurial learning ===
Startups need to learn at a huge speed before running out of resources. Proactive actions (experimentation, searching, etc.) enhance a founder's learning to start a company. To learn effectively, founders often formulate falsifiable hypotheses, build a minimum viable product (MVP), and conduct A/B testing.

=== Business model design ===
With the key learnings from market validation, design thinking, and lean startup, founders can design a business model. However, it is important not to dive into business models too early before there is sufficient learning on market validation. Paul Graham said: "What I tell founders is not to sweat the business model too much at first. The most important task at first is to build something people want. If you don't do that, it won't matter how clever your business model is."

== Founders, entrepreneurs ==
Founders or co-founders are people involved in the initial launch of startup companies. Three people are mainly required as co-founders to create a powerful team: the product person (e.g. an engineer), a marketing person (for market research, customer interaction, vision) and a finance or operations person (to handle operations or raise funds).

The founder that is responsible for the overall strategy of the startup plays the role of founder-CEOs, much like CEOs in established firms. Startup studios provide an opportunity for founders and team members to grow along with the business they help to build. In order to create forward momentum, founders must ensure that they provide opportunities for their team members to grow and evolve within the company.

The language of securities regulation in the United States considers co-founders to be promoters under Regulation D. The U.S. Securities and Exchange Commission definition of promoter includes: (i) Any person who, acting alone or in conjunction with one or more other persons, directly or indirectly takes initiative in founding and organizing the business or enterprise of an issuer; However, not every promoter is a co-founder. In fact, there is no formal, legal definition of what makes somebody a co-founder. The right to call oneself a co-founder can be established through an agreement with one's fellow co-founders or with permission of the board of directors, investors, or shareholders of a startup company. When there is no definitive agreement (like shareholders' agreement), disputes about who the co-founders are, can arise.

=== Self-efficacy ===
Self-efficacy refers to the confidence an individual has to create a new business or startup. It has a strong relation with startup actions. Entrepreneurs' sense of self-efficacy can play a major role in how they approach goals, tasks, and challenges. Entrepreneurs with high self-efficacy—that is, those who believe they can perform well—are more likely to view difficult tasks as something to be mastered rather than something to be avoided.

=== Stress ===
Startups are pressure cookers. Don't let the casual dress and playful office environment fool you. New enterprises operate under do-or-die conditions. If you do not roll out a useable product or service in a timely fashion, the company will fail. Bye-bye paycheck, hello eviction.

— Iman Jalali, chief of staff at ContextMedia

Entrepreneurs often feel stressed. They have internal and external pressures. Internally, they need to meet deadlines to develop the prototypes and get the product or service ready for market. Externally they are expected to meet milestones of investors and other stakeholders to ensure continued resources from them on the startups. Coping with stress is critical to entrepreneurs because of the stressful nature of starting up a new firm under uncertainty. Coping with stress unsuccessfully could lead to emotional exhaustion, and the founders may close or exit the startups.

=== Emotional exhaustion ===
Sustaining effort is required as the startup process can take a long period of time, by one estimate, three years or longer. Sustaining effort over the long term is especially challenging because of the high failure rates and uncertain outcomes.

=== Founder identity and culture ===
Some startup founders have a more casual or offbeat attitude in their dress, office space and marketing, as compared to executives in established corporations. For example, startup founders in the 2010s wore hoodies, sneakers and other casual clothes to business meetings. Their offices may have recreational facilities in them, such as pool tables, ping pong tables, football tables and pinball machines, which are used to create a fun work environment, stimulate team development and team spirit, and encourage creativity. Some of the casual approaches, such as the use of "flat" organizational structures, in which regular employees can talk with the founders and chief executive officers informally, are done to promote efficiency in the workplace, which is needed to get their business off the ground.

In a 1960 study, Douglas McGregor stressed that punishments and rewards for uniformity in the workplace are not necessary because some people are born with the motivation to work without incentives. Some startups do not use a strict command and control hierarchical structure, with executives, managers, supervisors and employees. Some startups offer employees incentives such as stock options, to increase their "buy in" from the start up (as these employees stand to gain if the company does well). This removal of stressors allows the workers and researchers in the startup to focus less on the work environment around them, and more on achieving the task at hand, giving them the potential to achieve something great for both themselves and their company.

== Failure ==
The failure rate of startup companies is very high. Analysts continue to report very high startup failure rates. While a 2014 Fortune article estimated that 90% fail, more recent analyses indicate that about 65–80% of startups fail within five years, depending on industry and geography. In the UK, for example, startups (companies in their first seven years) accounted for 46% of all company insolvencies in 2024—the lowest proportion in over a decade, according to PwC. In a sample of 101 unsuccessful startups, companies reported that experiencing one or more of five common factors were the reason for failure: the lack of consumer interest in the product or service (42% of failures), funding or cash problems (29%), personnel or staffing problems (23%), competition from rival companies (19%) and problems with pricing of the product or service (18%).

In cases of funding problems, it can leave employees without paychecks. Sometimes, these companies are purchased by other companies if they are deemed to be viable, but oftentimes, they leave employees with very little recourse to recoup lost income for worked time. More than one-third of founders believe that running out of money led to failure. Second to that, founders attribute their failure to a lack of financing or investor interest. These common mistakes and missteps that happen early in the startup journey can result in failure, but there are precautions entrepreneurs can take to help mitigate risk. For example, startup studios offer a buffer against many of the obstacles that solo entrepreneurs face, such as funding and insufficient team structure, making them a good resource for startups in their earliest phases. Another large study of 160.000 failed companies, identified key factors such as a dysfunctional founding team, a poor business plan, or just a flawed product-market fit as examples of the primary sources of failure.

The lack of human and financial resources or even dedicated patent attorneys in the early stages of a startup makes it difficult to compete with larger companies, and likewise increases the time and reduces the probability of patent applications.

=== Re-starters ===
Failed entrepreneurs, or restarters, who after some time restart in the same sector with more or less the same activities, have an increased chance of becoming a better entrepreneur. However, some studies indicate that restarters are more heavily discouraged in Europe than in the US.

== Training ==
Many institutions and universities provide training on startups. In the context of universities, some of the courses are entrepreneurship courses that also deal with the topic of startups, while other courses are specifically dedicated to startups. Startup courses are found both in traditional economic or business disciplines as well as the side of information technology disciplines. As startups are often focused on software, they are also occasionally taught while focusing on software development alongside the business aspects of a startup.

Founders go through a lot to set up a startup. A startup requires patience and resilience, and training programs need to have both the business components and the psychological components. Entrepreneurship education is effective in increasing the entrepreneurial attitudes and perceived behavioral control, helping people and their businesses grow. Most of startup training falls into the mode of experiential learning, in which students are exposed to a large extent to a real-life entrepreneurship context as new venture teams. An example of group-based experiential startup training is the Lean LaunchPad initiative that applies the principles of customer development and Lean Startup to technology-based startup projects.

As startups are typically thought to operate under a notable lack of resources, have little or no operating history, and to consist of individuals with little practical experience, it is possible to simulate startups in a classroom setting with reasonable accuracy. In fact, it is not uncommon for students to actually participate in real startups during and after their studies. Similarly, university courses teaching software startup themes often have students found mock-up startups during the courses and encourage them to make them into real startups should they wish to do so. Such mock-up startups, however, may not be enough to accurately simulate real-world startup practice if the challenges typically faced by startups (e.g. lack of funding to keep operating) are not present in the course setting.

To date, much of the entrepreneurship training is yet to be personalized to match the participants and the training.

== Ecosystem ==
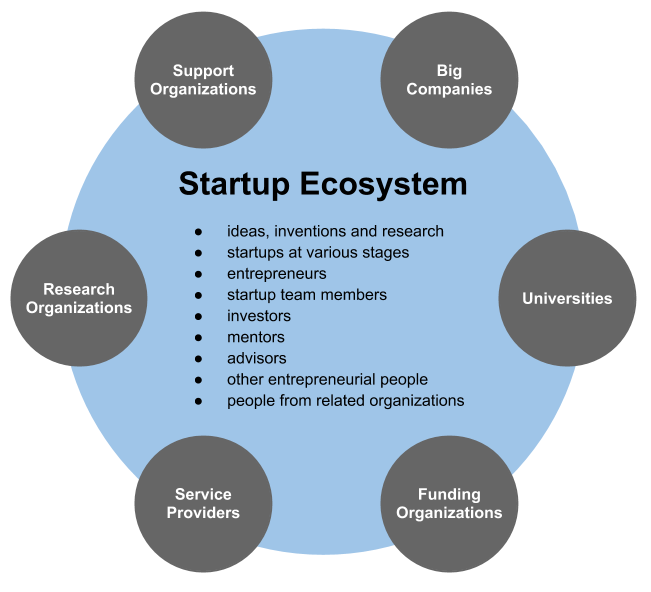
A startup ecosystem can contribute to local entrepreneurial culture.

The size and maturity of the startup ecosystem is where a startup is launched and where it grows to have an effect on the volume and success of the startups. The startup ecosystem consists of the individuals (entrepreneurs, venture capitalists, angel investors, mentors, advisors); institutions and organizations (top research universities and institutes, business schools and entrepreneurship programs and centres operated by universities and colleges, non-profit entrepreneurship support organizations, government entrepreneurship programs and services, Chambers of commerce) business incubators and business accelerators and top-performing entrepreneurial firms and startups. A region with all of these elements is considered to be a "strong" startup ecosystem.

Major computer and internet firms, in addition to top universities such as Stanford University, have created a startup ecosystem in California's Silicon Valley. Boston (where Massachusetts Institute of Technology is located) and Berlin, home of WISTA (a top research area), also have numerous creative industries, entrepreneurs and startup firms. Attempts are being made worldwide, for example in Israel's Silicon Wadi, France's Inovallée or Italy's Trieste AREA Science Park, to network basic research, universities and technology parks in order to create a startup-friendly ecosystem.

Although there are startups created in all types of businesses, and all over the world, some locations and business sectors are particularly associated with startup companies. The internet bubble of the late 1990s was associated with huge numbers of internet startup companies, some selling the technology to provide internet access, others using the internet to provide services. Most of this startup activity was located in the most well-known startup ecosystem - Silicon Valley, an area of northern California renowned for the high level of startup company activity:

The spark that set off the explosive boom of "Silicon startups" in Stanford Industrial Park was a personal dispute in 1957 between employees of Shockley Semiconductor and the company's namesake and founder, Nobel laureate and co-inventor of the transistor William Shockley... (His employees) formed Fairchild Semiconductor immediately following their departure... After several years, Fairchild gained its footing, becoming a formidable presence in this sector. Its founders began leaving to start companies based on their own latest ideas and were followed on this path by their own former leading employees... The process gained momentum and what had once begun in a Stanford's research park became a veritable startup avalanche... Thus, over the course of just 20 years, a mere eight of Shockley's former employees gave forth 65 new enterprises, which then went on to do the same...

Startup advocates are also trying to build a community of tech startups in New York City with organizations like NY Tech Meet Up and Built in NYC. In the early 2000s, the patent assets of failed startup companies were being purchased by people known as patent trolls, who assert those patents against companies that might be infringing the technology covered by the patents.

== Investing ==
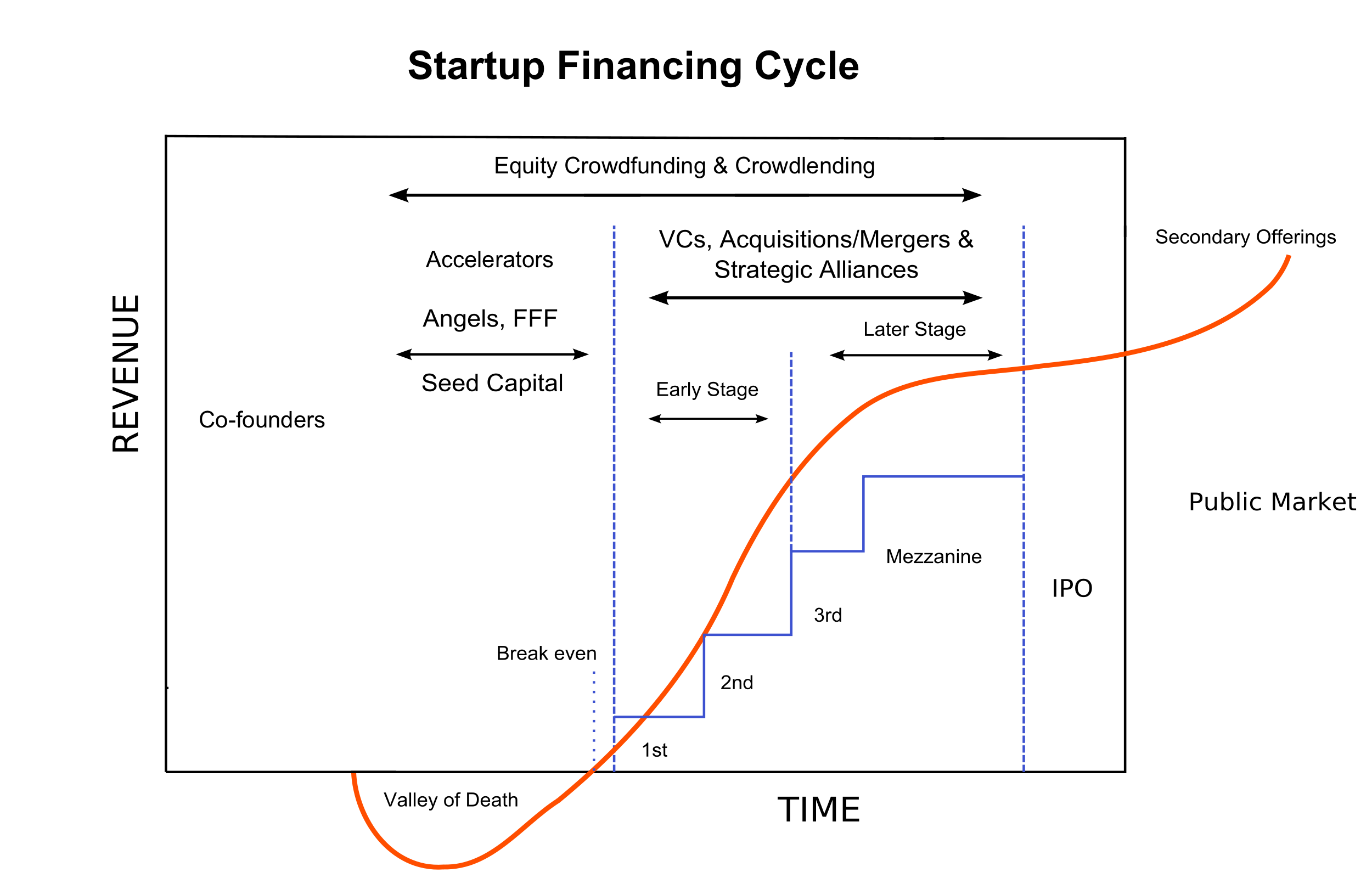
Diagram of the typical financing cycle for a startup company

Startup investing is the action of making an investment in an early-stage company. Beyond founders' own contributions, some startups raise additional investment at some or several stages of their growth. Not all startups trying to raise investments are successful in their fundraising. Venture Capital is a subdivision of Private Equity wherein external investors fund small-scale startups that have high growth potential in the long run. Venture capital is the money of invention that is invested into young businesses which hold no historic background. Usually, the business of venture capital is highly risky but one can at the same time expect high returns as well.

In the United States, the solicitation of funds became easier for startups as result of the JOBS Act. Prior to the advent of equity crowdfunding, a form of online investing that has been legalized in several nations, startups did not advertise themselves to the general public as investment opportunities until and unless they first obtained approval from regulators for an initial public offering (IPO) that typically involved a listing of the startup's securities on a stock exchange. Today, there are many alternative forms of IPO commonly employed by startups and startup promoters that do not include an exchange listing, so they may avoid certain regulatory compliance obligations, including mandatory periodic disclosures of financial information and factual discussion of business conditions by management that investors and potential investors routinely receive from registered public companies.

Over the last decade, Europe has developed a rapid start-up scene that has given birth to global players, including more than 70 unicorns, and has created more than two million jobs. Investment in European start-ups increased sixfold between 2010 and 2020, reaching approximately €40 billion. Europe does a poorer job of nurturing young companies because of a failure to support their development into industry leaders. Promising European start-ups then struggle to raise the necessary capital to expand and mature. They are forced to either relocate to the US's deep capital markets or sell themselves to larger rivals with more financial availability. As a result, start-ups in the United States can typically raise far more money—up to five times as much as in Europe.

Investors generally evaluate new companies on the strength of their founding team, their risk/reward ratio, and their scalability. Startups may offer greater potential returns than establishes businesses, but typically involve greater risk. Their scalability can allow them to grow rapidly with a limited investment of capital, labor or land. The timing of a startup's entry into a market has been identified as an important factor in its success, though determining the appropriate timing can be difficult for entreprenurs and investors.

Startups have several options for funding. Revenue-based financing lenders can help startup companies by providing non-dilutive growth capital in exchange for a percentage of monthly revenue. Venture capital firms and angel investors may help startup companies begin operations, exchanging seed money for an equity stake in the firm. Venture capitalists and angel investors provide financing to a range of startups (a portfolio), with the expectation that a very small number of the startups will become viable and make money. In practice though, many startups are initially funded by the founders themselves using "bootstrapping", in which loans or monetary gifts from friends and family are combined with savings and credit card debt to finance the venture. Factoring is another option, though it is not unique to startups. Other funding opportunities include various forms of crowdfunding, for example equity crowdfunding, in which the startup seeks funding from a large number of individuals, typically by pitching their idea on the Internet.

Startups can receive funding via more involved stakeholders, such as startup studios. Startup studios provide funding to support the business through a successful launch, but they also provide extensive operational support, such as HR, finance and accounting, marketing, and product development, to increase the probability of success and propel growth.

Startup are funded through preset rounds, depending on their funding requirement and the stage of growth of the company. Startup investing is generally divided into six stage, namely

1. Angel funding
2. Seed Funding
3. Pre-Series A
4. Series B
5. Series C, D
6. Series E, F and Beyond

=== Necessity of funding ===
While some (would-be) entrepreneurs believe that they can't start a company without funding from VC, Angel, etc. that is not the case. In fact, many entrepreneurs have founded successful businesses for almost no capital, including the founders of MailChimp, Shopify, and ShutterStock.

=== Valuations ===
If a company's value is based on its technology, it is often equally important for the business owners to obtain intellectual property protection for their idea. The newsmagazine The Economist estimated that up to 75% of the value of US public companies is now based on their intellectual property (up from 40% in 1980). Often, 100% of a small startup company's value is based on its intellectual property. As such, it is important for technology-oriented startup companies to develop a sound strategy for protecting their intellectual capital as early as possible. Startup companies, particularly those associated with new technology, sometimes produce huge returns to their creators and investors—a recent example of such is Google, whose creators became billionaires through their stock ownership and options.

=== Investing rounds ===
When investing in a startup, there are different types of stages in which the investor can participate. The first round is called seed round. The seed round generally is when the startup is still in the very early phase of execution when their product is still in the prototype phase. There is likely no performance data or positive financials as of yet. Therefore, investors rely on strength of the idea and the team in place. At this level, family friends and angel investors will be the ones participating. At this stage the level of risk and payoff are at their greatest. The next round is called Series A. At this point the company already has traction and may be making revenue. In Series A rounds venture capital firms will be participating alongside angels or super angel investors. The next rounds are Series B, C, and D. These three rounds are the ones leading towards the Initial Public Offering (IPO). Venture capital firms and private equity firms will be participating. Series B: Companies are generating consistent revenue but must scale to meet growing demand. Series C & D: Companies with strong financial performance looking to expand to new markets, develop new products, make an acquisition, and/or preparing for IPO.

=== History of startup investing ===
After the Great Depression, which was blamed in part on a rise in speculative investments in unregulated small companies, startup investing was primarily a word of mouth activity reserved for the friends and family of a startup's co-founders, business angels, and Venture Capital funds. In the United States, this has been the case ever since the implementation of the Securities Act of 1933. Many nations implemented similar legislation to prohibit general solicitation and general advertising of unregistered securities, including shares offered by startup companies. In 2005, a new Accelerator investment model was introduced by Y Combinator that combined fixed terms investment model with fixed period intense bootcamp style training program, to streamline the seed/early-stage investment process with training to be more systematic.

Following Y Combinator, many accelerators with similar models have emerged around the world. The accelerator model has since become very common and widely spread and they are key organizations of any Startup ecosystem. Title II of the Jumpstart Our Business Startups Act (JOBS Act), first implemented on 23 September 2013, granted startups in and startup co-founders or promoters in US. the right to generally solicit and advertise publicly using any method of communication on the condition that only accredited investors are allowed to purchase the securities. However the regulations affecting equity crowdfunding in different countries vary a lot with different levels and models of freedom and restrictions. In many countries there are no limitations restricting general public from investing to startups, while there can still be other types of restrictions in place, like limiting the amount that companies can seek from investors. Due to positive development and growth of crowdfunding, many countries are actively updating their regulation in regards to crowdfunding.

=== Investing online ===
The first known investment-based crowdfunding platform for startups was launched in February 2010 by Grow VC, followed by the first US. based company ProFounder launching model for startups to raise investments directly on the site, but ProFounder later decided to shut down its business due regulatory reasons preventing them from continuing, having launched their model for US. markets prior to JOBS Act. With the positive progress of the JOBS Act for crowd investing in US., equity crowdfunding platforms like SeedInvest and CircleUp started to emerge in 2011 and platforms such as investiere, Companisto and Seedrs in Europe and OurCrowd in Israel. The idea of these platforms is to streamline the process and resolve the two main points that were taking place in the market. The first problem was for startups to be able to access capital and to decrease the amount of time that it takes to close a round of financing. The second problem was intended to increase the amount of deal flow for the investor and to also centralize the process.

== Internal startups ==
Internal startups are a form of corporate entrepreneurship. Large or well-established companies often try to promote innovation by setting up "internal startups", new business divisions that operate at arm's length from the rest of the company. Examples include Bell Labs, a research unit within the Bell System and Target Corporation (which began as an internal startup of the Dayton's department store chain) and threedegrees, a product developed by an internal startup of Microsoft.

== Unicorns ==
Some startups become big and they become unicorns, i.e. privately held startup companies valued at over US$1 billion. The term was coined in 2013 by venture capitalist Aileen Lee, choosing the mythical animal to represent the statistical rarity of such successful ventures. As of January 2025, there are 1,523 unicorns worldwide, with a combined valuation of about US$5.6 trillion. The United States leads with 758 unicorns (≈49.8%), followed by China with 343, and India with 64. The unicorns are concentrated in a few countries. The unicorn leaders are the U.S. with 196 companies, China with 165, India with 107 and the U.K. with 16. The largest unicorns included Ant Financial, ByteDance, DiDi, Uber, Xiaomi, and Airbnb. When the value of a company is over US$10 billion, the company will be called as a decacorn. When the company is valued over US$100 billion, hectocorn will be used.

== Critiques of the start-up mode ==
According to Nikos Smyrnaios, Silicon Valley's start-ups are emblematic of the post-Fordist enterprise, reflecting a move toward values of liberty, autonomy and authenticity, and away from the Fordist emphasis on solidarity, economic security and equality.

For some researchers, such as Antoine Gouritin, the start-up model, like many digital-related objects, is underpinned by a "solutionist" logic, as Evgeny Morozov describes it. Technological solutionism corresponds to the belief that thanks to digital tools such as those created by start-ups, simple and technical solutions can be found to all kinds of problems. Therefore, what is expected of start-ups is not that they address the root causes of problems, but that they find effective technical solutions quickly.

The organizational model of start-ups is also questioned by former employees. For example, Mathilde Ramadier, a former start-up employee, brings the debate to the fore in France with her book Bienvenue dans le nouveau monde. Comment j'ai survécu à la coolitude des start-ups [Welcome to the new world. How I survived start-up coolness] in 2017. Since then, awareness has been growing. The non-hierarchical organization of start-ups means that all employees bear equal responsibility for their running smoothly. They are based on voluntary commitment and internalized behavioral norms rather than formal hierarchical constraints. Employees, encouraged to meet targets, often exceed overtime limits. Professional and personal life often blend in this highly connected environment. Employees are expected, without discussion, to give of themselves without counting the cost, to be always reachable and available, without asking for compensation commensurate with their professional commitment (in terms of time and activities), and to place the general interest of the organization before their personal interest. Finally, the employment contracts of start-up employees are often precarious since the company itself is not completely stable.

Economist Scott A. Shane has used data on start-ups published in many countries to draw conclusions in terms of public policy. He is critical of public policy that encourages start-ups, pointing to evidence that these policies lead people to create marginal businesses that are more likely to fail, have little economic impact, and generate a very limited number of jobs.

== Today ==
In 2024, the San Francisco bay area has the highest number of startups globally, with 14,500. It is followed by New York City with 12,500 and Silicon Wadi in Israel, with around 9000, which is the highest per capita figure in the world.

According to PitchBook research, nearly 1 in 4 startups claims to be an artificial intelligence company as of 2024.

== See also ==
- Brand management
- Business incubator
- Business plan
- Deep tech
- Flex space
- Innovation
- Liquidity event
- Platform cooperative
- Small business
- Vesting § Ownership in startup companies
- Unicorn bubble
