= Kavaklı =

Kavaklı (literally "with poplar") is a Turkish place name and may refer to:

- Kavaklı, Ergani
- Kavaklı, Gelibolu
- Kavaklı, Ilgaz
- Kavaklı, İspir
- Kavaklı, Kırklareli, a town in the central district of Kırklareli Province
- Kavaklı, Kahta, a village in Kahta district of Adıyaman Proıvince
- Kavaklı, Şuhut, a village in Şuhut district of Afyonkarahisar Province
- Kavaklı, Göynücek, a village in Göynücek district of Amasya Province
- Kavaklı, Mut, a village in Mut district of Mersin Province

== See also ==
- Kavaklıdere (disambiguation)
