= Unicorn (finance) =

Startup company valued at over $1 billion

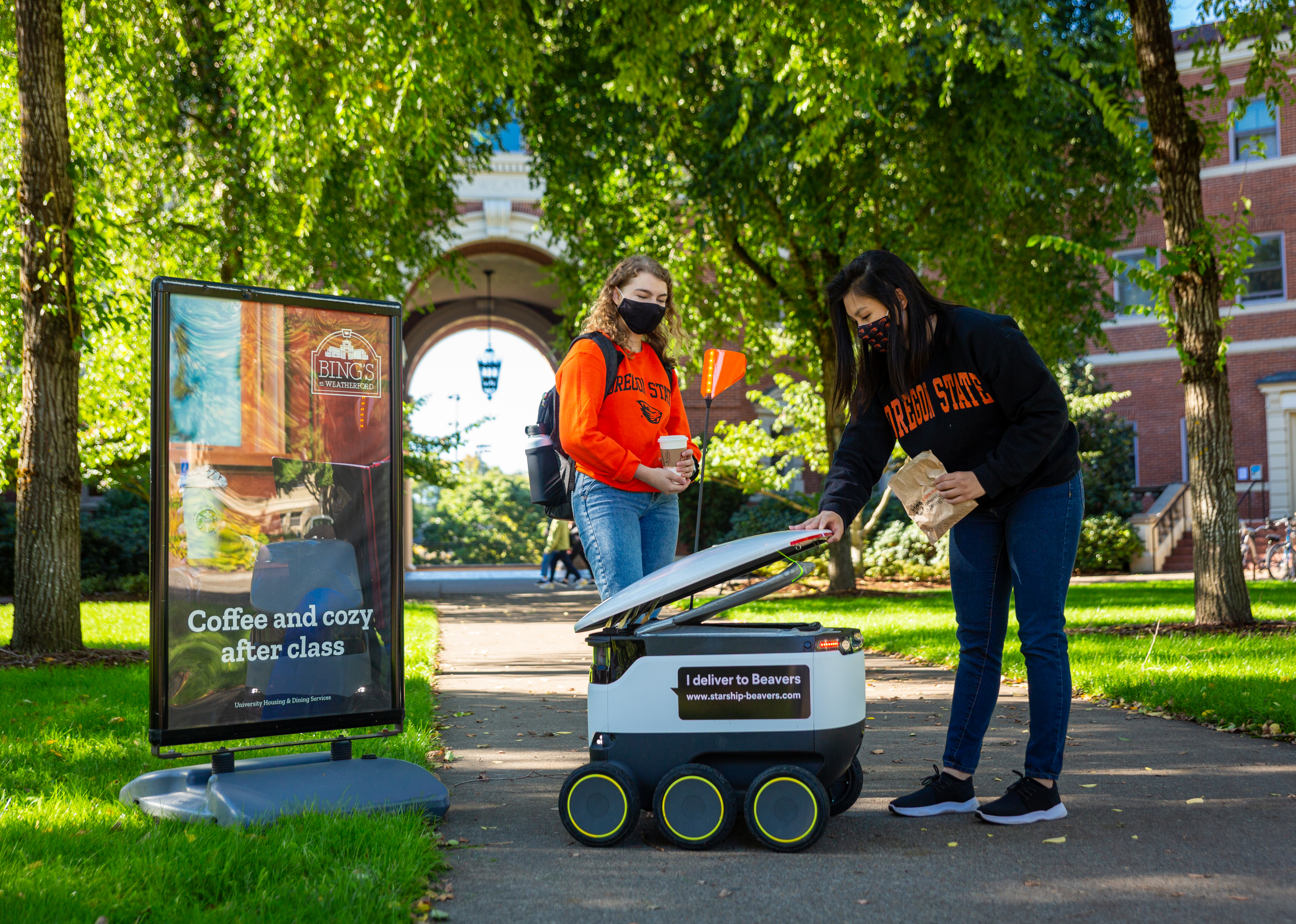
Delivery robot company Starship Technologies is an Estonian unicorn.

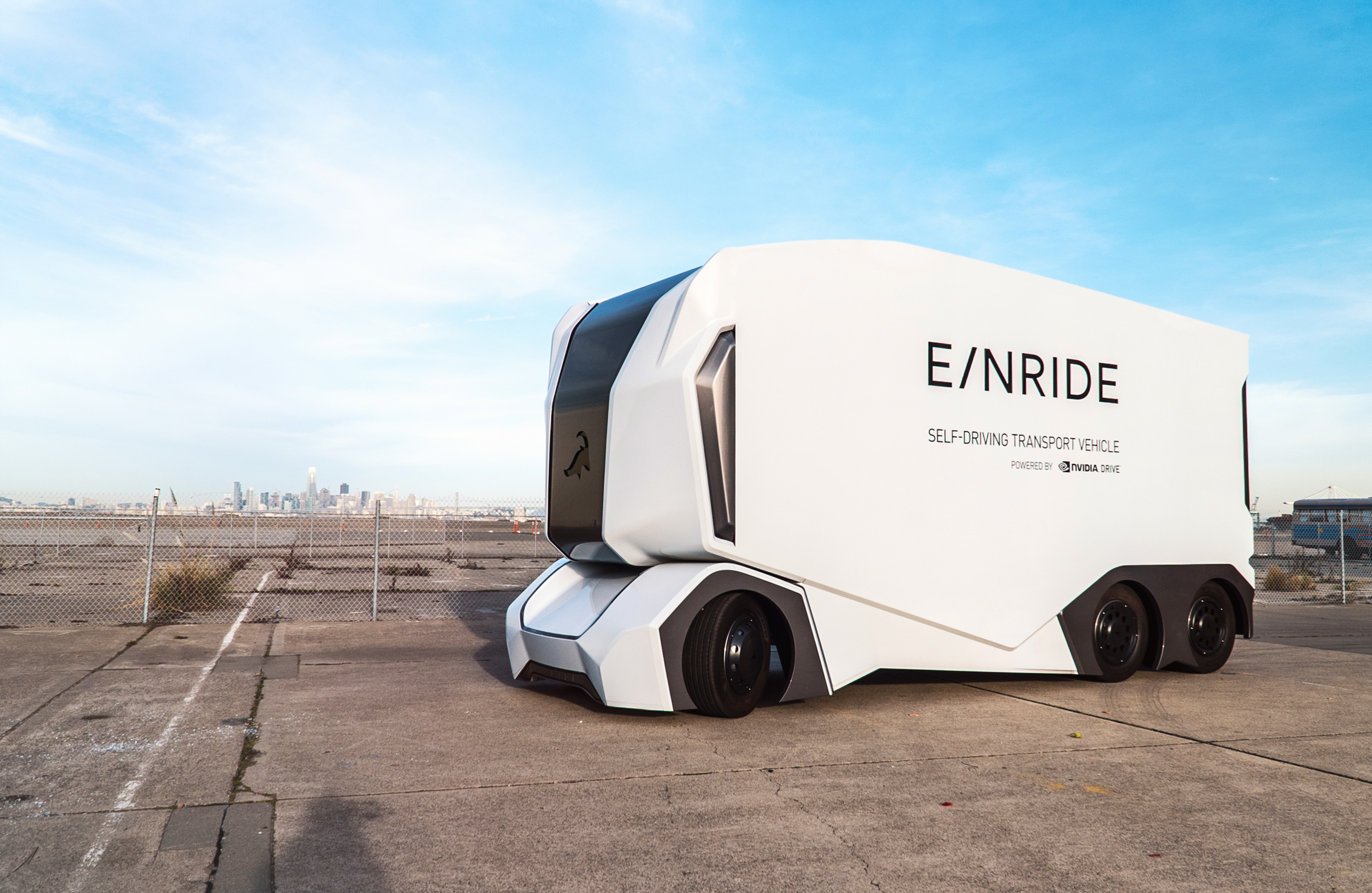
Self-driving truck manufacturer Einride is a Swedish unicorn.

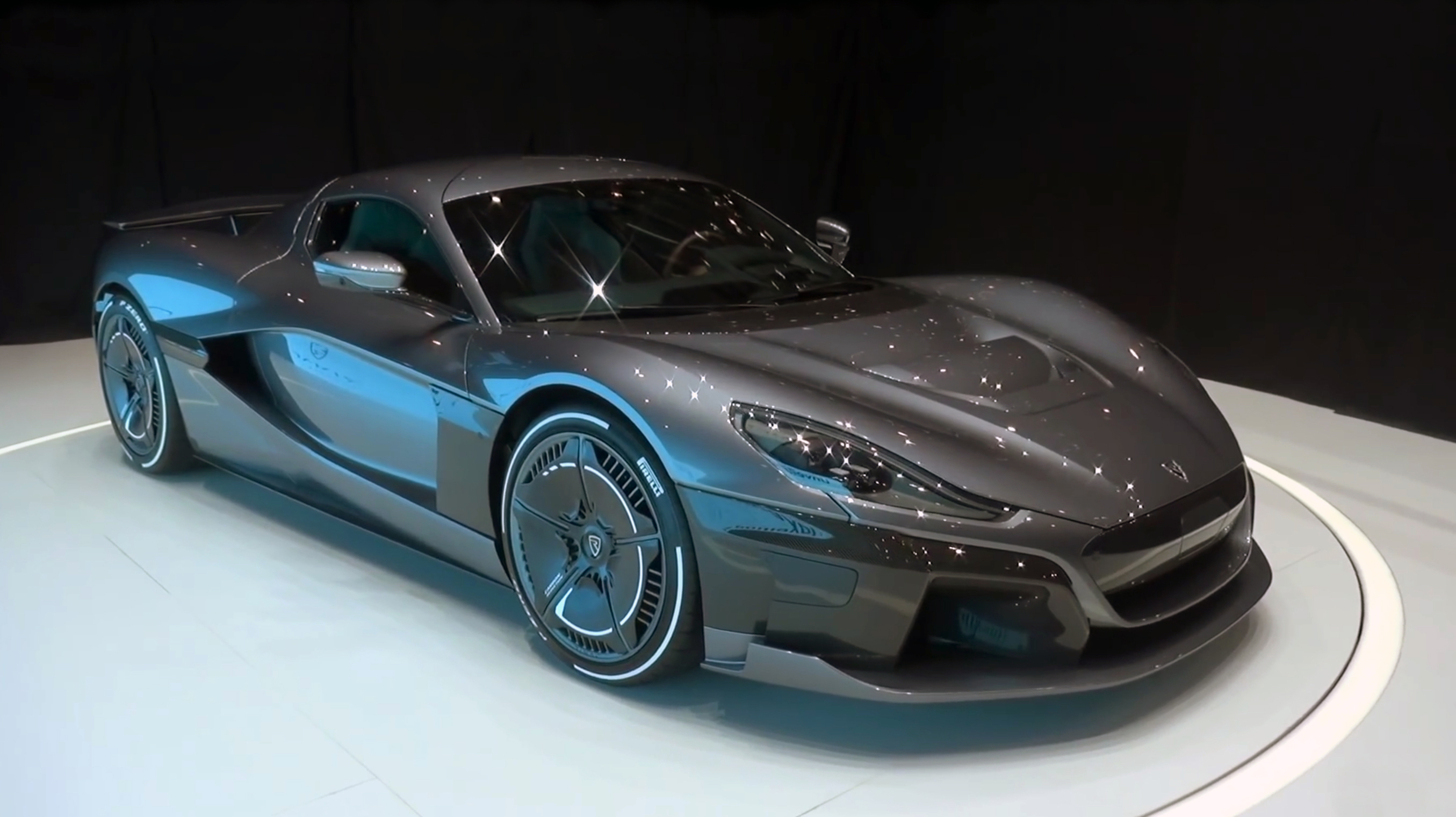
Hypercar manufacturer and EV technology developer Rimac Automobili is a Croatian unicorn.

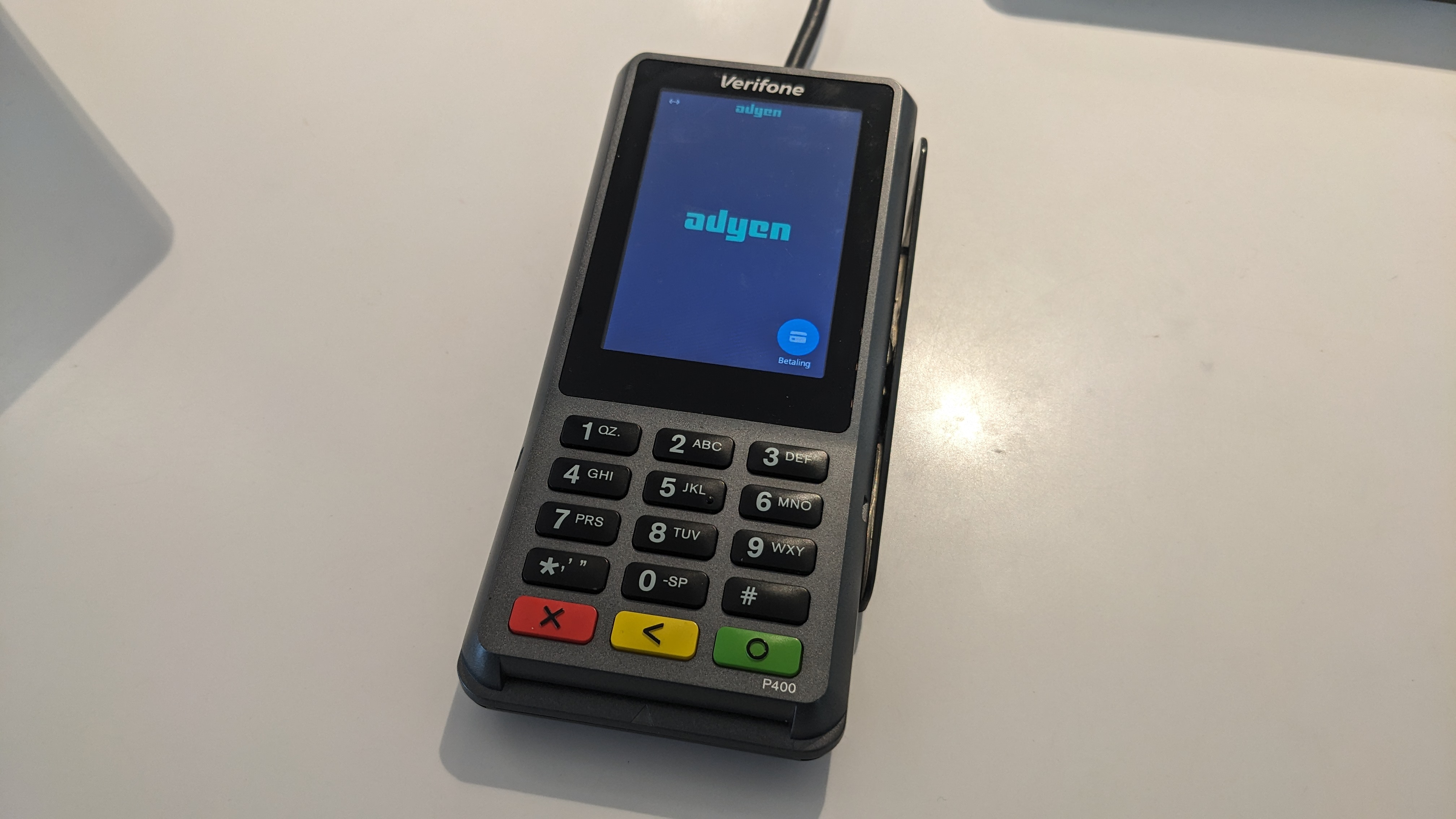
Payment provider Adyen is a Dutch decacorn.

In business, a unicorn is a startup company valued at over US$1 billion which is privately owned and therefore its company shares are not publicly listed. The term was coined in 2013 by venture capitalist Aileen Lee, choosing the mythical animal to represent the statistical rarity of such successful ventures.

Many unicorns saw their valuations fall in 2022 as a result of an economic slowdown caused by the COVID-19 pandemic, an increase in interest rates causing the cost of borrowing to grow, increased market volatility, stricter regulatory scrutiny and underperformance. CB Insights identified 1,248 unicorns worldwide as of May 2024. Of the 51 companies founded in 2022 or later that Crunchbase tagged as unicorns by September 2026, 20 used a .ai domain and 17 a .com domain. Unicorns with over $10 billion in valuation have been designated as "decacorn" companies. For private companies valued over $100 billion, the terms "centicorn" and "hectocorn" have been used. Those worth $1 trillion have been called a "terracorn". Historically, founded in 1946 American Research & Development Corporation (ARDC) is considered the first modern venture capital firm; ARDC's first breakout investment in 1957 of $70,000 in Digital Equipment Corporation (DEC) became the defining success of early venture capital, and is considered the first 'unicorn'-level return investment with ARDC's Dorothy Rowe as the lead board member.

== History ==
Aileen Lee originated the term "unicorn" in a 2013 TechCrunch article, "Welcome To The Unicorn Club: Learning from Billion-Dollar Startups". At the time, 39 companies were identified as unicorns. In a different study done by Harvard Business Review, it was determined that startups founded between 2012 and 2015 were growing in valuation twice as fast as startup companies founded between 2000 and 2003.

In 2018, 16 US companies became unicorns, resulting in 119 private companies worldwide valued at $1 billion or more. Globally, according to CB Insights, there were more than 1,200 unicorns as of September 2024, with ByteDance, SpaceX and Stripe among the largest.

The surge of unicorns was reported as "meteoric" for 2021, with $71 billion invested in 340 new companies, a banner year for startups and for the US venture capital industry; the unprecedented number of companies valued at more than $1 billion during 2021 exceeded the sum total of the five previous years. Six months later, in June 2022, 1,170 total unicorns were reported. IPL with $10.9 billion made into decacorn in 2022. The growth of unicorns has slowed more recently with 1248 total unicorns reported in May 2024.

== Reasons for rapid growth of unicorns ==
=== Fast-growing strategy ===
During the mid-2000s, investors and venture capital firms were adopting first-mover advantage and get-big-fast (GBF) strategies for startups, also known by the neologism, "blitzscaling". GBF is a strategy where a startup tries to expand at a high rate through large funding rounds and price cutting to gain an advantage on market share and push away rival competitors as fast as possible. The rapid returns through this strategy seem to be attractive to all parties involved, despite the cautionary note of the dot-com bubble of 2000, as well as a lack of long-term sustainability in value creation of emerging companies of the Internet age.

=== Company buyouts ===
Many unicorns were created through buyouts by large public companies. In a low-interest-rate and slow-growth environment, many companies like Apple, Meta, and Google focus on acquisitions instead of focusing on capital expenditures and development of internal investment projects. Some large companies would rather bolster their businesses through buying out established technology and business models rather than creating it themselves.

=== Increase in private capital available ===
The average age of a technology company before it goes public is 11 years, as opposed to an average life of 4 years back in 1999. This new dynamic stems from the increased amount of private capital available to unicorns and the passing of the US's Jumpstart Our Business Startups (JOBS) Act in 2012, which increased by a factor of four the number of shareholders a company can have before it has to disclose its financials publicly. The amount of private capital invested in software companies has increased three-fold from 2013 to 2015.

=== Prevent IPO ===
Through many funding rounds, companies do not need to go through an initial public offering (IPO) to obtain capital or a higher valuation; they can just go back to their investors for more capital. IPOs also run the risk of devaluation of a company if the public market thinks a company is worth less than its investors. A few recent examples of this situation were Square, best known for its mobile payments and financial services business, and Trivago, a popular German hotel search engine, both of which were priced below their initial offer prices by the market.

This was because of the severe over-valuation of both companies in the private market by investors and venture capital firms. The market did not agree with both companies' valuations, and therefore, dropped the price of each stock from their initial IPO range. Investors and startups may choose to avoid an IPO due to increased regulations. Regulations like the Sarbanes–Oxley Act have implemented more stringent regulations following several bankruptcy cases in the U.S. market that many of these companies want to avoid.

=== Technological advances ===
Startups have capitalized on the growth of new technology to obtain unicorn status. With the advent of social media and access to millions of people utilizing this technology to gain economies of scale, startups have the ability to expand their business faster.

== Valuation ==
The valuations that designate start-up companies as unicorns and decacorns differ from established companies. A valuation for an established company stems from past years' performances, while a start-up company's valuation is derived from its growth opportunities and its expected development in the long-term for its potential market. Valuations for unicorns usually result from funding rounds of large venture capital firms investing in a start-up company. Another significant final valuation of start-ups is when a much larger company buys out a company, giving it that valuation; some examples are Unilever buying Dollar Shave Club and Facebook buying Instagram for $1 billion each, effectively turning Dollar Shave Club and Instagram into unicorns.

Bill Gurley, a partner at venture capital firm Benchmark, predicted in March 2015 and earlier that the rapid increase in the number of unicorns may "have moved into a world that is both speculative and unsustainable", that will leave in its wake what he terms "dead unicorns". Also he said that the main reason of unicorns' valuation is the "excessive amount of money" available for them. Similarly, in 2015 William Danoff, who manages the Fidelity Contrafund, said unicorns might be "going to lose a bit of luster" due to their more frequent occurrence and several cases of their stock price being devalued. Research by Stanford professors published in 2018 suggests that unicorns are overvalued by an average of 48%.

=== Valuation of high-growth companies ===
When investors of high-growth companies are deciding whether to invest in a company, they look for signs of high potential returns on their investment along with a personality that fits the company. To give high valuations in funding rounds, venture capital firms have to believe in the vision of both the entrepreneur and the company. They have to believe the company can evolve from its unstable, uncertain present standing into a company that can generate and sustain moderate growth in the future.

==== Market sizing ====
To judge the potential future growth of a company, there needs to be an in-depth analysis of the target market. When a company or investor determines its market size, there are a few steps they need to consider to figure out how large the market really is:

- Defining the sub-segment of the market (no company can target 100% market share, also known as monopolization)
- Top-Down market sizing
- Bottom-Up analysis
- Competitor analysis

After the market is reasonably estimated, a financial forecast can be made based on the size of the market and how much a company thinks it can grow in a certain time period.

==== Estimation of finances ====
To properly judge the valuation of a company after the revenue forecast is completed, a forecast of the operating margin, analysis of needed capital investments, and return on invested capital needs to be completed to judge the growth and potential return to investors of a company. Assumptions of where a company can grow to needs to be realistic, especially when trying to get venture capital firms to give the valuation a company wants. Venture capitalists know the payout on their investment will not be realized for another five to ten years, and they want to make sure from the start that financial forecasts are realistic.

==== Valuation methods ====
With the financial forecasts set, investors need to know what the company should be valued in the present day. This is where more established valuation methods become more relevant. This includes the three most common valuation methods:

- Discounted cash flow analysis
- Market comparable method
- Comparable transactions

Investors can derive a final valuation from these methods and the amount of capital they offer for a percentage of equity within a company becomes the final valuation for a startup. Competitor financials and past transactions also play an important part when providing a basis for valuing a startup and finding a correct valuation for these companies.

== Trends ==
=== Sharing economy ===
The sharing economy, also known as "collaborative consumption" or "on-demand economy", is based on the concept of sharing personal resources. This trend of sharing resources made three of the top five largest unicorns (Uber, DiDi, and Airbnb) become the most valuable startups in the world in 2015. The economic trends of the 2010s powered consumers to learn to be more conservative with spending and the sharing economy reflected this.

=== E-commerce ===
E-commerce and the innovation of the online marketplace have been slowly taking over the needs for physical locations of store brands. A prime example of this is the decline of malls within the United States, the sales of which declined from $87.46 billion in 2005 to $60.65 billion in 2015. The emergence of e-commerce companies like Amazon and Alibaba (both unicorns before they went public) has decreased the need for physical locations to buy consumer goods. Many large corporations have seen this trend for a while and have tried to adapt to the e-commerce trend. Walmart in 2016 bought Jet.com, an American e-commerce company, for $3.3 billion to try to adapt to consumer preferences.

=== Innovative business model ===
In support of the sharing economy, unicorns and successful startups have built an operating model defined as "network orchestrators". In this business model, there is a network of peers creating value through interaction and sharing. Network orchestrators may sell products/services, collaborate, share reviews, and build relations through their businesses. Examples of network orchestrators include all sharing economy companies, companies that let consumers share information, and peer-to-peer or business-to-person selling platforms.

== List of regions by number of unicorns ==
Bay area, USA

The following is a list by Dutch research company dealroom:

=== By absolute numbers ===
Ranking in 2023	Area	Unicorns created since 2019
1	(United States) Bay Area	377
2	(United States) New York City	179
3	(Israel) Tel Aviv	83
4	(United States) Boston	80
5	(United States) Los Angeles	64
6	(China) Beijing	57
7	(United Kingdom) London	55
8	(France) Paris	54
9	(China) Shanghai	41
10	(India) Bengaluru	31
11	(United States) Seattle	29
12	(United States) Chicago	28
13	(United States) Austin	24
14	(Germany) Berlin	24
15	(United States) San Diego	23

=== Per capita ===
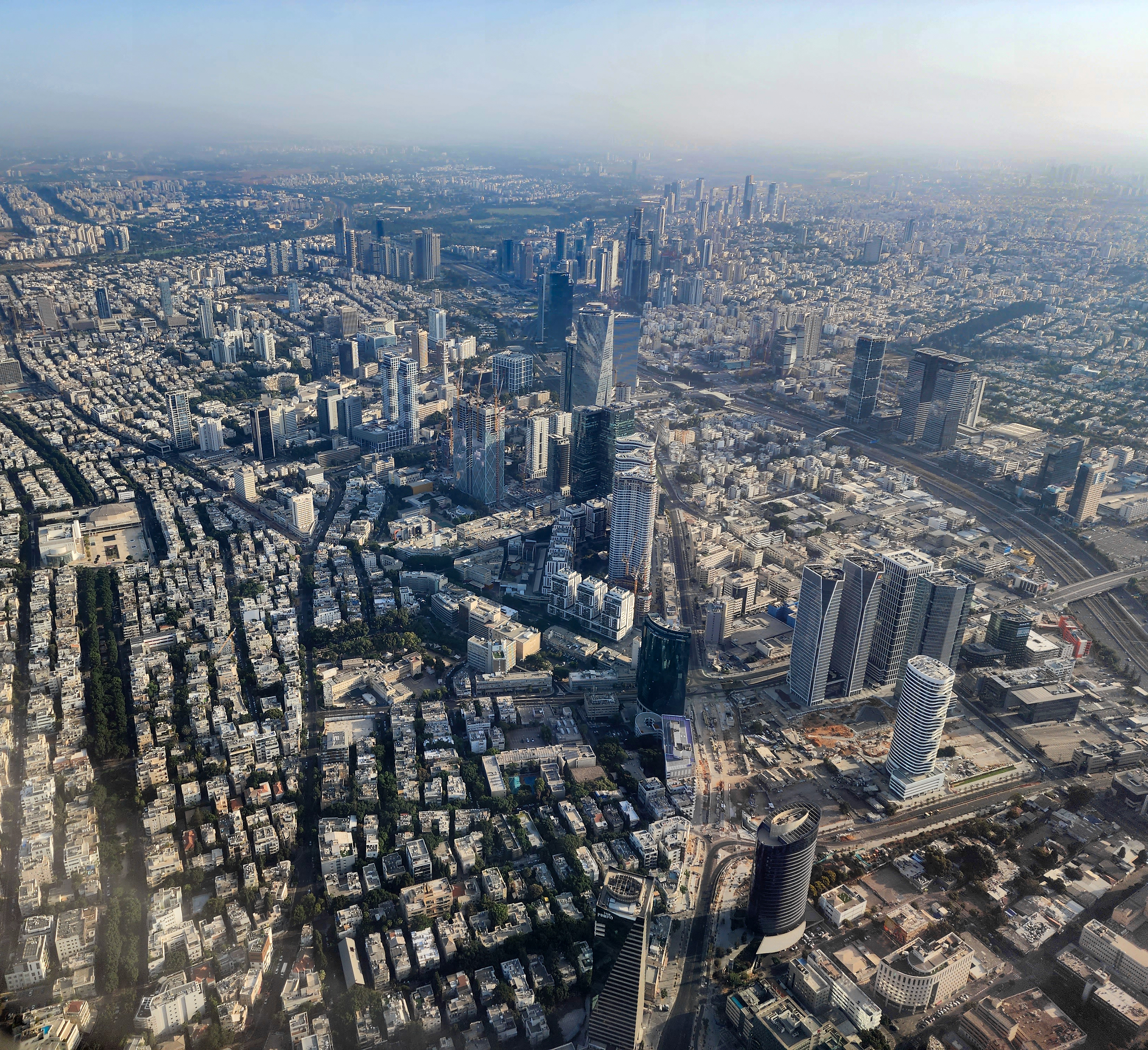
Tel Aviv center

Unicorns per 1 million people:

Ranking in 2023	Area	Unicorns created since 2019
1	(United States) Bay Area	48.6
2	(Israel) Tel Aviv	21.3
3	(United States) Boston	16.3
4	(United States) Austin	10.9
5	(United States) New York City	9.0
6	(United States) Seattle	7.4
7	(United Kingdom) London	7.4
8	(France) Paris	7.4
9	(United States) San Diego	7.0
10	(Germany) Berlin	6.0
11	(United States) Los Angeles	4.8
12	(India) Bengaluru	3.0
13	(United States) Chicago	2.9
14	(China) Beijing	2.7
15	(China) Shanghai	1.5

== Related terms ==
=== Minicorn ===
A minicorn is a startup with a valuation that exceeds $1 million. These are startups post product-market fit and with substantial revenue growth.

=== Soonicorn ===
A soonicorn is a startup that is growing quickly and has the potential to reach $1 billion valuation in the near future.

=== Decacorn ===
A decacorn is a startup with a valuation above $10 billion.

=== Hectocorn ===
A hectocorn is a rare term, typically used to describe startups with a valuation above $100 billion.

=== Kilocorn ===
A kilocorn is an informal term used in business and technology reporting to refer to a company valued at around US$1 trillion. TechCrunch used the term in 2024 and described it as “a trillion-dollar company”, and Fortune defined it as a “$1 trillion private startup”. Forge Global discussed “kilocorn” as one proposed label for a trillion-dollar-plus private company, alongside alternative proposals.

=== Camel startups ===
Like unicorn, camel is a term commonly used to describe startups. The term refers to companies that can survive unfavourable conditions with minimal resource expenditure.

== Unicorns by country ==
=== List of Argentine unicorns ===
Business name	Value (US$ millions)	Sector
Mercado Libre	100,000	Marketplace
Globant	1,600	Fintech
Despegar	1,600	Marketplace
Ualá	3,200	Fintech
Tienda Nube	3,100	Marketplace
Satellogic	1,000	Fintech
Vercel	2,500	Fintech
OLX	1,200	Marketplace
Auth0	6,500	Fintech
Technisys	1,000	Fintech
Mural	2,000	Fintech
Bitfarms	1,000	Fintech

=== List of Spanish unicorns ===
Business name	Value (US$ millions)	Sector
Jobandtalent	2,300	Software
Cabify	1,400	Transport
TravelPerk	1,300	Tourism
Recover	1,100	fashion
Factorial	1,000	Human resources
vLex	1,000	Legaltech
Multiverse Computing	1,700	AI

=== List of Mexican unicorns ===
Business name	Value (US$ millions)	Sector
Kavak	8,700	Automobile
Banco Plata	5,000	Fintech
Bitso	2,200	Fintech
Clip	1,600	Fintech
Konfío	1,300	Fintech
Merama	1,200	E-commerce
Incode	1,250	Artificial Intelligence
Clara	1,000	Fintech
Nowports	1,100	Logistics
Stori	1,200	Fintech
Kapital Bank	1,200	Fintech

=== List of French unicorns ===
Business name	Value (US$ millions)	Sector
Doctolib	6,500	Healthtech
Mistral AI	6,230	AI
Contentsquare	5,600	
Qonto	5,000	Fintech
Alan	4,500	Insurtech
Hugging Face	4,500	AI
Sorare	4,300	NFT / Blockchain
Mirakl	3,500	Marketplace SaaS / E-commerce
Poolside	3,000	Chatbots
Voodoo	2,310	Videogames
Pennylane	2,160	Fintech
PayFit	2,100	Fintech
Exotec	2,000	logistics
Ankorstore	2,000	Marketplace B2B
BlaBlaCar	2,000	Transport
Vestiaire Collective	1,640	E-commerce
Deezer	1,500	Streaming
Caocao Mobility Paris	1,370	Transport
Ledger	1,300	Hardware wallets
Spendesk	1,140	Fintech
Swile	1,000	HRTech
DentalMonitoring	1,000	Healthtech
Owkin	1,000	Biotech / AI
Lydia	1,000	Fintech
HR Path	1,000	HRTech
EcoVadis	1,000	ESG
Verkor	1,000+	Energy
Pigment	1,000	SaaS
Ynsect	1,000	Agrotech
Meero	1,000	AI

== Criticism ==
The categorization of startups as unicorns has been subject to criticism. For example, an economic policy focused on enabling more unicorns, as the European Union is striving to do, threatens to lose sight of other societally desirable forms of entrepreneurship.

== See also ==
- List of unicorn startup companies
- List of venture capital firms
- First-mover advantage
- Unicorn bubble
- Venture capital financing
