= Kavak =

Kavak may refer to:

== Places ==
- Kavak, Arhavi, a village in the District of Arhavi, Artvin Province, Turkey
- Kavak, İskilip, a village in the İskilip District of Çorum Province in Turkey
- Kavak, Maden, a village in the Maden District of Elazığ Province in Turkey
- Kavak, Samsun, a district in Samsun Province, Turkey
- Kavak, Silifke, a village in Silifke district of Mersin Province, Turkey
- Kavak, Yapraklı, a village in the Yapraklı district of Çankırı Province in Turkey
- Kara-Kavak, a village in the Osh Province of Kyrgyzstan

== Other uses ==
- Kavak (company), a unicorn startup company
- Kavak Yelleri, a Turkish television series
- Erhan Kavak (born 1987), Turkish-Swiss footballer

== See also ==
- Kavač, Kotor, Montenegro
- Kavac Indian village, within the Canaima National Park in Bolívar State, Venezuela
- Kavaklıdere (disambiguation)
