= Topuzsaray, Yapraklı =

Village in Turkey

Topuzsaray
- Village
- Location in Turkey Topuzsaray (Turkey Central Anatolia)
- Coordinates: 40°38′23″N 33°53′33″E
- Country: Turkey
- Province: Çankırı
- District: Yapraklı
- Population (2021): 178
- Time zone: UTC+3 (TRT)

Topuzsaray is a village in the Yapraklı District of Çankırı Province in Turkey. Its population is 178 (2021). Situated approximately 119 kilometers northeast of the capital city, Ankara. The region is a mix of lowland areas and elevations, common in the interior Anatolian landscape. Neighboring villages are Çevrecik and İkizören.
