= Akyazı (disambiguation) =

Akyazı is a Turkish toponym meaning "good luck" (literally "white writing," alluding to a favorable court decision). It may refer to the following places in Turkey:

- Akyazı, a town and district of Sakarya Province
- Akyazı, Adilcevaz, a village
- Akyazı, Adıyaman, a village in the District of Adıyaman, Adıyaman Province
- Akyazı, Amasya, a village in the District of Amasya, Amasya Province
- Akyazı, Aziziye
- Akyazı, Besni, a village in the District of Besni, Adıyaman Province
- Akyazı, Çorum
- Akyazı, Düzce
- Akyazı, Erzincan
- Akyazı, Yapraklı
