= İğdir, Yapraklı =

Village in Turkey

İğdir
- Neighbourhood
- Country: Turkey
- Province: Çankırı
- District: Yapraklı
- Municipality: Yapraklı
- Population (2021): 112
- Time zone: UTC+3 (TRT)

İğdir is a neighbourhood of the town Yapraklı, Yapraklı District, Çankırı Province, Turkey. Its population as of 2021 is 112.
