= Yamaçbaşı, Yapraklı =

Village in Turkey

Yamaçbaşı
- Village
- Location in Turkey Yamaçbaşı (Turkey Central Anatolia)
- Coordinates: 40°42′35″N 33°56′46″E
- Country: Turkey
- Province: Çankırı
- District: Yapraklı
- Population (2021): 32
- Time zone: UTC+3 (TRT)

Yamaçbaşı is a village in the Yapraklı District of Çankırı Province in Turkey. Its population is 32 (2021).
