= Aşağıöz, Yapraklı =

Village in Turkey

Aşağıöz
- Village
- Location in Turkey Aşağıöz (Turkey Central Anatolia)
- Coordinates: 40°49′N 33°53′E
- Country: Turkey
- Province: Çankırı
- District: Yapraklı
- Population (2024): 645
- Time zone: UTC+3 (TRT)

Aşağıöz is a village in the Yapraklı District of Çankırı Province in Turkey. Its population is 272 (2021).
