= Gürmeç, Yapraklı =

Village in Turkey

Gürmeç
- Village
- Location in Turkey Gürmeç (Turkey Central Anatolia)
- Coordinates: 40°39′N 34°01′E
- Country: Turkey
- Province: Çankırı
- District: Yapraklı
- Population (2021): 33
- Time zone: UTC+3 (TRT)

Gürmeç is a village in the Yapraklı District of Çankırı Province in Turkey. Its population is 33 (2021).
