= Kirliakça, Yapraklı =

Village in Turkey

Kirliakça
- Village
- Location in Turkey Kirliakça (Turkey Central Anatolia)
- Coordinates: 40°37′48″N 33°55′08″E
- Country: Turkey
- Province: Çankırı
- District: Yapraklı
- Population (2021): 63
- Time zone: UTC+3 (TRT)

Kirliakça is a village in the Yapraklı District of Çankırı Province in Turkey. Its population is 63 (2021).
