= Doğanbey, Yapraklı =

Village in Turkey

Doğanbey
- Village
- Location in Turkey Doğanbey (Turkey Central Anatolia)
- Coordinates: 40°42′42″N 33°51′0″E
- Country: Turkey
- Province: Çankırı
- District: Yapraklı
- Population (2021): 103
- Time zone: UTC+3 (TRT)

Doğanbey is a village in the Yapraklı District of Çankırı Province in Turkey. Its population is 103 (2021).
