= Kavak, Yapraklı =

Village in Turkey

Kavak
- Neighbourhood
- Country: Turkey
- Province: Çankırı
- District: Yapraklı
- Municipality: Yapraklı
- Population (2021): 282
- Time zone: UTC+3 (TRT)

Kavak (also: Kavakköy) is a neighbourhood of the town Yapraklı, Yapraklı District, Çankırı Province, Turkey. Its population is 282 (2021).
