= Belibedir, Yapraklı =

Village in Turkey

Belibedir
- Village
- Location in Turkey Belibedir (Turkey Central Anatolia)
- Coordinates: 40°43′N 34°02′E
- Country: Turkey
- Province: Çankırı
- District: Yapraklı
- Population (2021): 75
- Time zone: UTC+3 (TRT)

Belibedir is a village in the Yapraklı District of Çankırı Province in Turkey. Its population is 75 (2021).
