= Sofuoğlu, Yapraklı =

Village in Turkey

Sofuoğlu
- Village
- Location in Turkey Sofuoğlu (Turkey Central Anatolia)
- Coordinates: 40°41′14″N 33°57′07″E
- Country: Turkey
- Province: Çankırı
- District: Yapraklı
- Population (2021): 87
- Time zone: UTC+3 (TRT)

Sofuoğlu is a village in the Yapraklı District of Çankırı Province in Turkey. Its population is 87 (2021).
