= Akyazı, Yapraklı =

Village in Turkey

Akyazı
- Neighbourhood
- Location in Turkey Akyazı (Turkey Central Anatolia)
- Coordinates: 40.7492°N 33.8283°E
- Country: Turkey
- Province: Çankırı
- District: Yapraklı
- Municipality: Yapraklı
- Population (2021): 239
- Time zone: UTC+3 (TRT)

Akyazı is a neighbourhood of the town Yapraklı, Yapraklı District, Çankırı Province, Turkey. Its population is 239 (2021).
