= Yapraklı =

- Municipality
- Location in Turkey Yapraklı (Turkey Central Anatolia)
- Coordinates: 40°45′26″N 33°46′44″E
- Country: Turkey
- Province: Çankırı
- District: Yapraklı

Government
  - Mayor: Ömer Güngör (MHP)
- Elevation: 1,276 m (4,186 ft)
- Population (2021): 2,151
- Time zone: UTC+3 (TRT)
- Area code: 0376
- Website: www.yaprakli.bel.tr

Yapraklı is a town in Çankırı Province in the Central Anatolia region of Turkey. It is the seat of Yapraklı District. Its population is 2,151 (2021). The town consists of 6 quarters: Aşağı, Camikebir, Yukarı, Akyazı, İğdir and Kavak. Its elevation is 1,276 m (4,186 ft).
