= Yakadere, Yapraklı =

Village in Turkey

Yakadere
- Village
- Location in Turkey Yakadere (Turkey Central Anatolia)
- Coordinates: 40°43′22″N 33°42′55″E
- Country: Turkey
- Province: Çankırı
- District: Yapraklı
- Population (2021): 93
- Time zone: UTC+3 (TRT)

Yakadere is a village in the Yapraklı District of Çankırı Province in Turkey. Its population is 93 (2021).
