= Ayvaköy, Yapraklı =

Village in Turkey

Ayvaköy
- Village
- Location in Turkey Ayvaköy (Turkey Central Anatolia)
- Coordinates: 40.7292°N 33.9848°E
- Country: Turkey
- Province: Çankırı
- District: Yapraklı
- Population (2021): 129
- Time zone: UTC+3 (TRT)

Ayvaköy is a village in the Yapraklı District of Çankırı Province in Turkey. Its population is 129 (2021).
