= Çevrecik, Yapraklı =

Village in Turkey

Çevrecik
- Village
- Location in Turkey Çevrecik (Turkey Central Anatolia)
- Coordinates: 40.6566°N 33.8533°E
- Country: Turkey
- Province: Çankırı
- District: Yapraklı
- Population (2021): 64
- Time zone: UTC+3 (TRT)

Çevrecik is a village in the Yapraklı District of Çankırı Province in Turkey. Its population is 64 (2021).
