= Büyükakseki, Yapraklı =

Village in Turkey

Büyükakseki
- Village
- Location in Turkey Büyükakseki (Turkey Central Anatolia)
- Coordinates: 40°38′52″N 33°56′53″E
- Country: Turkey
- Province: Çankırı
- District: Yapraklı
- Population (2021): 93
- Time zone: UTC+3 (TRT)

Büyükakseki is a village in the Yapraklı District of Çankırı Province in Turkey. Its population is 93 (2021).
