= Kıvcak, Yapraklı =

Village in Turkey

Kıvcak
- Village
- Location in Turkey Kıvcak (Turkey Central Anatolia)
- Coordinates: 40°46′05″N 33°52′54″E
- Country: Turkey
- Province: Çankırı
- District: Yapraklı
- Population (2021): 69
- Time zone: UTC+3 (TRT)

Kıvcak is a village in the Yapraklı District of Çankırı Province in Turkey. Its population is 69 (2021).
