= Bademçay, Yapraklı =

Village in Turkey

Bademçay
- Village
- Location in Turkey Bademçay (Turkey Central Anatolia)
- Coordinates: 40°46′N 33°59′E
- Country: Turkey
- Province: Çankırı
- District: Yapraklı
- Population (2021): 55
- Time zone: UTC+3 (TRT)

Bademçay is a village in the Yapraklı District of Çankırı Province in Turkey. Its population is 55 (2021).
