= Ovacık, Yapraklı =

Village in Turkey

Ovacık
- Village
- Location in Turkey Ovacık (Turkey Central Anatolia)
- Coordinates: 40°46′51″N 34°4′41″E
- Country: Turkey
- Province: Çankırı
- District: Yapraklı
- Population (2021): 388
- Time zone: UTC+3 (TRT)

Ovacık is a village in the Yapraklı District of Çankırı Province in Turkey. Its population is 388 (2021).
