= Çiçekköy, Yapraklı =

Village in Turkey

Çiçekköy
- Village
- Country: Turkey
- Province: Çankırı
- District: Yapraklı
- Population (2021): 62
- Time zone: UTC+3 (TRT)

Çiçekköy is a village in the Yapraklı District of Çankırı Province in Turkey. Its population is 62 (2021).
