= Zekeriyaköy, Yapraklı =

Village in Turkey

Zekeriyaköy
- Village
- Location in Turkey Zekeriyaköy (Turkey Central Anatolia)
- Coordinates: 40°39′58″N 33°54′37″E
- Country: Turkey
- Province: Çankırı
- District: Yapraklı
- Population (2021): 57
- Time zone: UTC+3 (TRT)

Zekeriyaköy is a village in the Yapraklı District of Çankırı Province in Turkey. Its population is 57 (2021).
