= Yeşilyayla, Yapraklı =

Village in Turkey

Yeşilyayla
- Village
- Country: Turkey
- Province: Çankırı
- District: Yapraklı
- Population (2021): 34
- Time zone: UTC+3 (TRT)

Yeşilyayla is a village in the Yapraklı District of Çankırı Province in Turkey. Its population is 34 (2021).
