= Buğay, Yapraklı =

Village in Turkey

Buğay
- Village
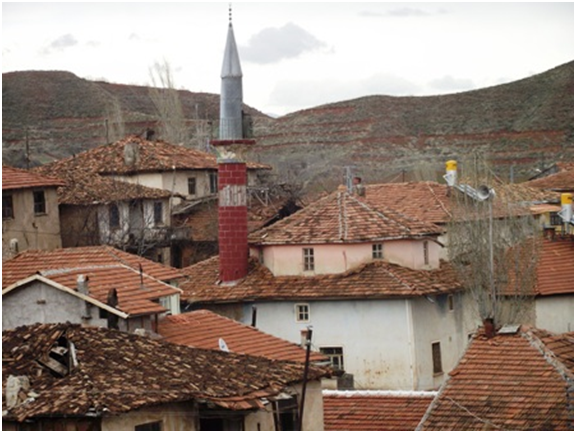

- Location within Turkey Location within Turkey Central Anatolia
- Coordinates: 40.7195°N 33.7585°E
- Country: Turkey
- Province: Çankırı
- District: Yapraklı
- Population (2021): 116
- Time zone: UTC+3 (TRT)

Buğay is a village in the Yapraklı District of Çankırı Province in Turkey. Its population is 116 (2021).
