= Şeyhosman, Yapraklı =

Village in Turkey

Şeyhosman
- Village
- Location in Turkey Şeyhosman (Turkey Central Anatolia)
- Coordinates: 40°43′N 33°53′E
- Country: Turkey
- Province: Çankırı
- District: Yapraklı
- Population (2021): 205
- Time zone: UTC+3 (TRT)

Şeyhosman is a village in the Yapraklı District of Çankırı Province in Turkey. Its population is 205 (2021).
