= Sazcığaz, Yapraklı =

Village in Turkey

Sazcığaz
- Village
- Country: Turkey
- Province: Çankırı
- District: Yapraklı
- Population (2021): 36
- Time zone: UTC+3 (TRT)

Sazcığaz is a village in the Yapraklı District of Çankırı Province in Turkey. Its population is 36 (2021).
