= Balıbıdık, Yapraklı =

Village in Turkey

Balıbıdık
- Village
- Location in Turkey Balıbıdık (Turkey Central Anatolia)
- Coordinates: 40°42′N 33°44′E
- Country: Turkey
- Province: Çankırı
- District: Yapraklı
- Population (2021): 141
- Time zone: UTC+3 (TRT)

Balıbıdık is a village in the Yapraklı District of Çankırı Province in Turkey. Its population is 141 (2021).
