= Yüklü, Yapraklı =

Village in Turkey

Yüklü
- Village
- Location in Turkey Yüklü (Turkey Central Anatolia)
- Coordinates: 40°40′52″N 33°47′41″E
- Country: Turkey
- Province: Çankırı
- District: Yapraklı
- Population (2021): 315
- Time zone: UTC+3 (TRT)

Yüklü is a village in the Yapraklı District of Çankırı Province in Turkey. Its population is 315 (2021). Before the 2013 reorganisation, it was a town (belde).
