= Buluca, Yapraklı =

Village in Turkey

Buluca
- Village
- Location in Turkey Buluca (Turkey Central Anatolia)
- Coordinates: 40°44′N 33°48′E
- Country: Turkey
- Province: Çankırı
- District: Yapraklı
- Population (2021): 50
- Time zone: UTC+3 (TRT)

Buluca is a village in the Yapraklı District of Çankırı Province in Turkey. Its population is 50 (2021).
