= Subaşı, Yapraklı =

Village in Turkey

Subaşı
- Village
- Location in Turkey Subaşı (Turkey Central Anatolia)
- Coordinates: 40.6963°N 33.9238°E
- Country: Turkey
- Province: Çankırı
- District: Yapraklı
- Population (2021): 92
- Time zone: UTC+3 (TRT)

Subaşı is a village in the Yapraklı District of Çankırı Province in Turkey. Its population is 92 (2021).
