= Ayseki, Yapraklı =

Village in Turkey

Ayseki
- Village
- Location in Turkey Ayseki (Turkey Central Anatolia)
- Coordinates: 40°47′N 33°54′E
- Country: Turkey
- Province: Çankırı
- District: Yapraklı
- Population (2021): 185
- Time zone: UTC+3 (TRT)

Ayseki is a village located in the Yapraklı District of Çankırı Province in Turkey. As of 2021, it had a population of 185 residents.
