= Yukarıöz, Yapraklı =

Village in Turkey

Yukarıöz
- Village
- Location in Turkey Yukarıöz (Turkey Central Anatolia)
- Coordinates: 40°49′N 33°50′E
- Country: Turkey
- Province: Çankırı
- District: Yapraklı
- Population (2021): 1,077
- Time zone: UTC+3 (TRT)

Yukarıöz is a village in the Yapraklı District of Çankırı Province in Turkey. Its population is 1,077 (2021). Before the 2013 reorganisation, it was a town (belde).
