= Davutlar, Yapraklı =

Village in Turkey

Davutlar
- Village
- Country: Turkey
- Province: Çankırı
- District: Yapraklı
- Population (2021): 141
- Time zone: UTC+3 (TRT)

Davutlar is a village in the Yapraklı District of Çankırı Province in Turkey. Its population is 141 (2021).
