= Karacaözü, Yapraklı =

Village in Turkey

Karacaözü
- Village
- Location in Turkey Karacaözü (Turkey Central Anatolia)
- Coordinates: 40°44′N 33°46′E
- Country: Turkey
- Province: Çankırı
- District: Yapraklı
- Population (2021): 156
- Time zone: UTC+3 (TRT)

Karacaözü is a village in the Yapraklı District of Çankırı Province in Turkey. Its population is 156 (2021).
