= Çakırlar, Yapraklı =

Village in Turkey

Çakırlar
- Village
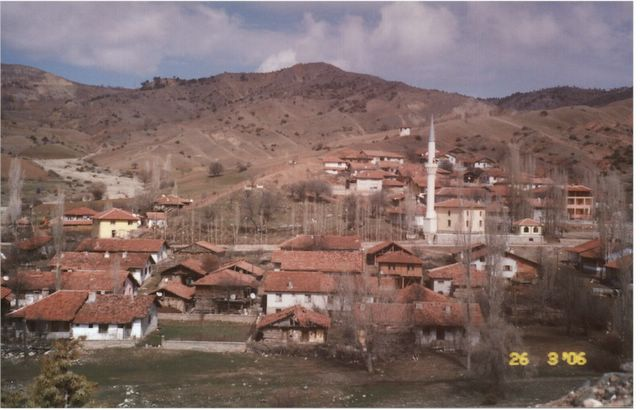

- Location within Turkey Location within Turkey Central Anatolia
- Coordinates: 40.7752°N 33.9863°E
- Country: Turkey
- Province: Çankırı
- District: Yapraklı
- Population (2021): 91
- Time zone: UTC+3 (TRT)

Çakırlar is a village in the Yapraklı District of Çankırı Province in Turkey. Its population is 91 (2021).
