= Unicorn bubble =

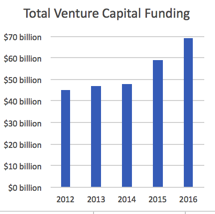
Venture capital funding values per year from 2012 - 2016 in USD

A unicorn bubble is a theoretical economic bubble that would occur when unicorn startup companies are overvalued by venture capitalists or investors. This can either occur during the private phase of these unicorn companies, or in an initial public offering. A unicorn company is a startup company valued at, or above, $1 billion US dollars.

== Factors of bubble growth ==
This increase in billion dollar startups is due to investors' readiness to funnel money into equity holdings in startups, with the total investment by venture capital firms rising from $68 billion in 2014 to $77.3 billion in 2015, and from $48 billion in 2014. Venture capitalists and academics are warning that given the lack of change in startup's overall profitability and future cash flows, the rise in valuations are unsustainable and unjustified. Startups are performing financially the way they always used to, but with greater resources. For example, a Harvard survey of venture capitalists found 91% of venture capitalists think that unicorns are overvalued. The efficiency in the use of the resources therefore is diminished and signals lower profitability for the future. These higher burn rates leading to lower profitability will decrease investors' gains in the next 5 to 10 years. The negative impact on venture capital firms will leave investors less inclined to further invest and invest in new companies. This decline is already manifesting itself in the number of startups with unicorn status and the total valuation of unicorns.

== Growth in recent years ==
The number of unicorns worldwide has more than doubled since 2015 with a total of 87 at the end of 2015 and 208 at the end of 2016. After doubling from 2014 to 2016, the number of unicorns peaked and 2016 saw a dip relative to 2015 of 21 unicorn startups, 21 out of 208 representing a decline of more than 10%. The total valuation dropped from $1.3 trillion to $761 billion signifying a 41% decrease in value in the startup economy. The warnings and risk mitigating attitude led by prominent sources in the venture capital industry such as Y Combinator and Andreessen Horowitz have led to more strictly measured investment strategies.

=== United States ===
The United States has the largest startup economy in the world with over 400,000 new companies created each year which makes it the most susceptible and the driver of the startup bubble. 14% of Americans in the labor force work for small or startup businesses. Startup studios have seen an explosion of growth in the past few years, with over 200 startup studios founded across the globe (and counting). Startup studios have accounted for the success of many well-recognized startups such as Dollar Shave Club, VacationRenter, Hims&Hers, and more. A shrinkage of this sector of the economy would impact 27 million Americans. While these numbers mean that entrepreneurship has brought about millions of jobs and has strengthened the US economy relative to the rest of the world, the size of the sector means that the Unicorn Bubble could harm millions of employees.

=== Asia ===
The Asian startup ecosystem is the fastest-growing in the world. $42 billion were invested by venture capital firms and the main entrepreneurship hubs in India and China had 10% growth in startups and 50% growth in venture capital activity respectively. The US is investing dozens of billions into Asian startups and vice versa. Given the global flow of startup investments, a slowdown in the US or Asian startup world will cause a slowdown for the other region as well.

== Potential aftermath ==
If the startup ecosystem and venture capital industry are indeed in a bubble, the collapse of the bubble would come about due to underperformance of unicorns invested in, leading to reduced profits for venture capital companies. The reduced profitability will lead to less means and inclination of investors to fund startups and an overall less startup-friendly economy. Primarily, this will hurt the startups and venture capital institutions as well as their employees. However, less investment and less interest in founding new companies will also hurt worldwide economic growth and innovation in the near future.

== Prevention ==
Increased moderation in funding from venture capitalists and angel investors as well a focus on frugality from startup teams are widely accepted as a solution the startup bubble. The underlying reason for the bubble lies in rapidly rising average valuations and funding activities, while most startups remain unprofitable. This cannot be changed. Most startups will always be unprofitable at the point of funding and use funding to increase revenues and more importantly profitability. However, it is possible to reduce risk for venture capital companies and mitigate factors contributing to the bubble by being less generous in deal sizes and using stricter measures when providing valuations. In addition, reducing burn rates is key to startups' overall stability and ability to live up to expectations.

== See also ==
- List of unicorn startup companies
- Unicorn finance
