= İkizören, Yapraklı =

Village in Turkey

İkizören
- Village
- Location in Turkey İkizören (Turkey Central Anatolia)
- Coordinates: 40°41′N 33°53′E
- Country: Turkey
- Province: Çankırı
- District: Yapraklı
- Population (2021): 181
- Time zone: UTC+3 (TRT)

İkizören is a village in the Yapraklı District of Çankırı Province in Turkey. Its population is 181 (2021). Before the 2013 reorganisation, it was a town (belde).
