= Kavaklıdere =

Kavaklıdere may refer to:

- Kavaklıdere, Ankara, a metropolitan district of Turkey's capital city, Ankara
- Kavaklıdere, Aziziye
- Kavaklıdere, Muğla, a district of Muğla Province of Turkey
- Kavaklıdere, İzmir, a village in Bornova district of İzmir Province, Turkey
- Kavaklıdere (wine), a Turkish wine brand, found in Ankara
