= Yapraklı District =

District of Çankırı Province, Turkey

- District
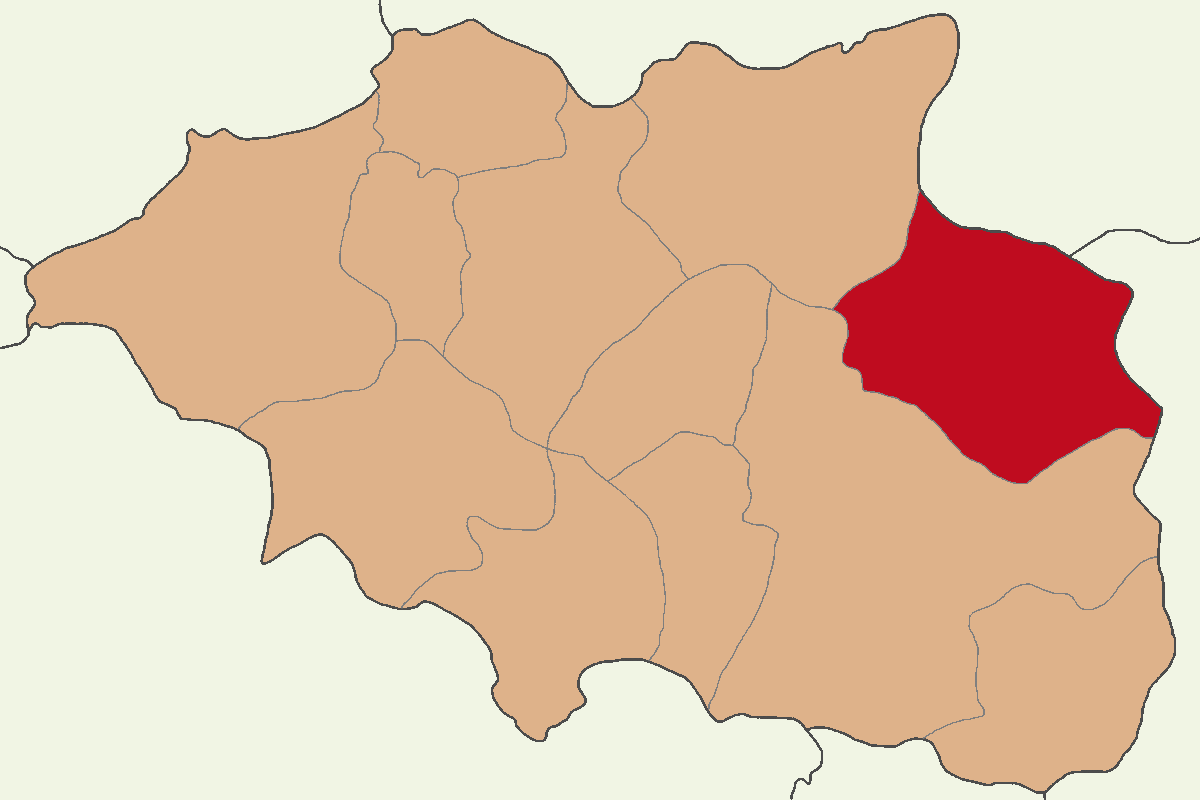
- Map showing Yapraklı District in Çankırı Province

- Location in Turkey Yapraklı District (Turkey Central Anatolia)
- Coordinates: 40°45′N 33°46′E
- Country: Turkey
- Province: Çankırı
- Seat: Yapraklı

Government
  - Kaymakam: Emre Oğuztürk
- Area: 741 km^{2} (286 sq mi)
- Population (2021): 7,646
  - Density: 10/km^{2} (27/sq mi)
- Time zone: UTC+3 (TRT)
- Website: www.yaprakli.gov.tr

Yapraklı District is a district of the Çankırı Province of Turkey. Its seat is the town of Yapraklı. Its area is 741 km^{2}, and its population is 7,646 (2021).

== Composition ==
There is one municipality in Yapraklı District:

- Yapraklı

There are 38 villages in Yapraklı District:

- Aşağıöz
- Ayseki
- Ayvaköy
- Bademçay
- Balıbıdık
- Belibedir
- Buğay
- Buluca
- Büyükakseki
- Çakırlar
- Çevrecik
- Çiçekköy
- Davutlar
- Doğanbey
- Gürmeç
- İkizören
- Karacaözü
- Kayacık
- Kaymaz
- Kirliakça
- Kıvcak
- Kullar
- Müsellim
- Ovacık
- Sarıkaya
- Sazcığaz
- Şeyhosman
- Sofuoğlu
- Subaşı
- Topuzsaray
- Yakadere
- Yakaköy
- Yamaçbaşı
- Yenice
- Yeşilyayla
- Yukarıöz
- Yüklü
- Zekeriyaköy
