= Michael Jones (entrepreneur) =

American entrepreneur and investor (born 1975)

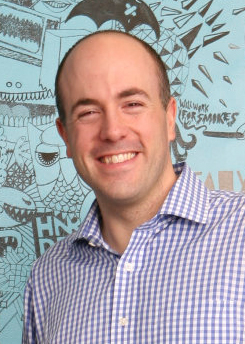
- Born: Michael Jones; August 13, 1975 (age 51); Lake Oswego, Oregon
- Education: University of Oregon (B.A.)
- Occupation: Entrepreneur

Michael Jones (born August 13, 1975) is an American entrepreneur, investor and CEO of Science Inc. He was named after his uncle, Olympic gold medalist Michael Schoettle.

== Education ==
Jones attended Lake Oswego High School and has a bachelor of arts in international business and marketing from the University of Oregon, where he was named Student Entrepreneur of the Year in 1997.

== Business career ==
=== Early career ===
In 2001, Jones founded Userplane, a Los Angeles-based company that provides instant messaging and other applications for companies such as Myspace and Honda. In 2006, Userplane was acquired by AOL. In 2005, Jones began angel investing, primarily focused in the Los Angeles area. He has personally invested in more than 30 startups. In 2008, Jones launched Tsavo Media, an online media network company which was later sold to Cybernex for $75 million.

=== Myspace ===
In 2010, Jones was hired as the CEO of Myspace where he was tasked with the company’s relaunch, one of the more high-profile turn-around challenges in the industry. This included stabilizing a historically negative traffic and user trend, reducing the operational cost of the business by nearly 90 percent, and pivoting the product from its legacy as a social network to a social entertainment destination, then selling the business on News Corp’s behalf to SpecificMedia. Jones left Myspace in the summer of 2011.

=== Science Inc. ===
In 2011, Jones launched technology startup studio Science Inc. Jones spent much of his time working with the companies’ CEOs and investors on strategy, growth and business development. In 2011, Dollar Shave Club launched with investments from Science Inc. Science was Dollar Shave Club’s first investor, before the startup raised a $1 million seed round in March 2012.

Other startups that have come from Science include Liquid Death, where Jones sits on the board; DogVacay (acquired by Rover); HelloSociety (acquired by The New York Times); HomeHero; FameBit (acquired by Google and rebranded as YouTube BrandConnect); Delicious; Playhaven (acquired by RockYou); Kyoku (acquired by TheFeed); and Quarterly. His exits in 2016 included Science portfolio companies HelloSociety (acquired by The New York Times), and Dollar Shave Club (acquired by Unilever).

In 2017, Science Inc. launched its initial coin offering for its blockchain-focused incubator, Science Blockchain. It was the first incubator to do so.

In February 2018, Science Inc. closed on $75 million for its venture fund with traditional limited partners, including a fund of funds, sovereign wealth funds, foundations, and other institutional investors. The capital will be used to back breakaway companies coming out of Science's incubators, co-invest in deals that were not seeded by Science, and will be used to co-invest alongside other venture investors.

=== Science Blockchain ===
In September 2017, Science Inc. announced Science Blockchain, an incubator focused on blockchain-based companies, funded through an initial coin offering (ICO). The offering falls within U.S. Securities and Exchange Commission (SEC) private placement exemptions from registration under Regulation D (SEC) and Regulation S. The ICO only allows accredited investors to buy tokens in the ICO. The ICO offering is being managed by The Argon Group, via its subsidiary Argon Investment Management LLC, under the Regulation D Section 506(c) exemption from registration issued by the U.S. Securities and Exchange Commission.

== Public speaking and media ==
Jones has appeared as a speaker and interview guest, including at Startup UCLA’s event "A Fireside Chat with Mike Jones" (2017).
