= PetCloud =

Australian pet care company

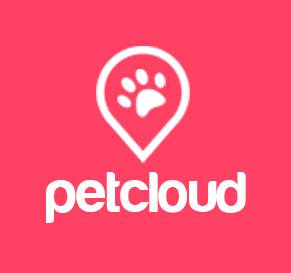
- Type: Privately held company
- Industry: Pet care
- Founded: 2011 in Brisbane, Australia
- Founder: Deb Webber
- Headquarters: Brisbane, Queensland, Australia
- Area served: Australia
- Services: Pet sitting; Doggy day care; Dog walking; House sitting; Pet management
- Website: www.petcloud.com.au

PetCloud is an Australian company selling pet care services and screening potential pet sitters for pet owners. The company also operates a government-licensed pet microchip registry and provides a pet management platform. It is based in Brisbane.

PetCloud was named a finalist in the Lord Mayor's Business Awards for Digital Strategy. In 2017, founder Deb Morrison was selected as 2017 Finalist for Young Entrepreneur in Brisbane.

== Services ==
PetCloud was founded by Deb Webber. PetCloud has been providing services including pet sitting, dog walking, online pet sitter training, and veterinary telehealth consultations. The company has received coverage from national and local news outlets, including Business News Australia and the Brisbane Times. In December, 2016, PetCloud was named a finalist in the Lord Mayor's Business Awards for Digital Strategy and a finalist for High Growth Start Up.

PetCloud launched an opt-in microchip registry that allows pet owners to register and manage their pets’ microchip information online. PetCloud’s pet-care processes and training were developed with input from RSPCA veterinarians and other animal-care professionals, with the aim of reducing the risk of harm or escape to animals in care and promoting animal welfare.

== Awards and recognition ==
- 11th Lord Mayor's Business Awards.
- ISPT award for Digital Strategy

== See also ==
- Dog boarding
- House sitting
- Pet sitting
- Dog walking
- Dog daycare
