= Rover (American company) =

Sharing economy site for pet sitters and dog walkers

Rover Group, Inc.
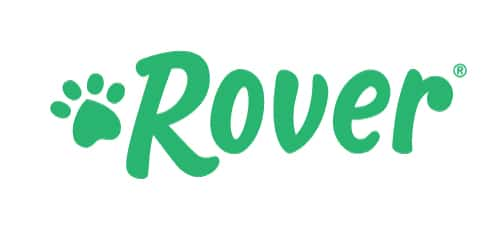
- Formerly: Rover.com
- Type: Private
- Traded as: Nasdaq: ROVR (2021–2024)
- Founded: June 13, 2011; 15 years ago
- Founders: Greg Gottesman; Aaron Easterly; Philip Kimmey
- Headquarters: Seattle, Washington, U.S.
- Area served: United States and Western Europe
- Key people: Brent Turner (CEO); Charlie Wickers (CFO)
- Services: Pet sitting; Dog boarding; Doggy day care; Dog walking; Drop-in visits; House sitting; Dog training
- Owner: Blackstone Inc. (2024–)
- Number of employees: 555 (2025)
- Subsidiaries: DogVacay; Dog Buddy; Cat in a Flat; GoodPup; Gudog
- Website: rover.com

Rover Group, Inc. is an American company which operates an online marketplace for people to buy and sell pet care services including pet sitting, dog boarding, and dog walking. Rover was founded in 2011 in Seattle and was formally incorporated under the name A Place for Rover, Inc. The company was publicly listed on the Nasdaq from 2021 until 2024, when it was taken private by Blackstone.

== History ==
Rover was conceived by Greg Gottesman after he had a negative experience at a kennel with his yellow Labrador and thought there must be a better care option. In June 2011, Gottesman pitched the idea at Startup Weekend in Seattle, Washington; He subsequently co-founded the company with Philip Kimmey. Aaron Easterly, another co-founder, became CEO later that summer. In December 2011, the Rover.com website launched and the business began local operations. In April 2012, the startup raised $3.4 million in an investment round led by Madrona Venture Group. By July 2012, services were available in 40 states.

In July 2013, Petco announced an investment in Rover, and a business partnership for cross-promotion with Petco's stores and website. In March 2014, Rover raised an additional $12 million in funding led by Menlo Ventures. One year later, in March 2015, it was announced that Rover raised a $25 million funding round led by Technology Crossover Ventures. By that time, Rover.com featured 25,000 pet sitters across all 50 states.

By 2017, Rover's services had expanded beyond dog sitting and boarding to include dog walking, dog daycare, and drop-in visits, as well as caretaking services for cats and other pets. On March 29, 2017, Rover acquired DogVacay in an all-stock deal. At that time, it was reported that total bookings on the combined sites amounted to $150 million in 2016, of which they kept about 20% in commission fees. The deal allowed Rover to expand its operations into Europe. In 2019, Rover formally expanded its services to include cat care, and in 2024 acquired Cat in a Flat, a cat-sitting service marketplace based in London.

Rover became a publicly traded company via a special-purpose acquisition company in August 2021. In November 2023, Blackstone announced that it would acquire Rover for $2.3 billion. The acquisition was completed in February 2024.

== Claim of negligence ==
In September 2020, a woman's dogs went missing for three months following a Rover visit. The sitter who had been watching the dogs was still accepting new clients and available on Rover while the pet owner was searching for her dogs. The Rover user asked for reimbursement and for the sitter to be removed. Rover responded by asking the user to reach out to Rover's team to review the case.

== See also ==
- Dog boarding
- House sitting
- Pet sitting
- Dog walking
- Dog daycare
