= Science Inc. =

Startup studio

- Type: Privately held company
- Industry: Venture capital
- Founded: 2011; 15 years ago in Los Angeles, US
- Headquarters: Los Angeles, USA
- Website: science-inc.com

Science Inc. is a Los Angeles–based startup studio that invests and offers expertise in corporations, in an attempt to bring them to profitability. In 2011, Michael Jones founded the organization and is the current chief executive officer. Jones spent time serving with the company's chief executive officers and investors on strategy, growth, and business development.

== Funding ==
Science Inc. initially received $10 million in backing from Eric Schmidt’s Tomorrow Ventures. In 2013, Science Inc. raised $30 million in funding from Hearst Ventures, the investment arm of Hearst Corporation, and was named to Fast Company’s list of The Most Innovative Companies. In 2015, Science Inc. raised $20 million in debt financing from Silver Lake Waterman.

== Notable affiliated companies ==
=== Dollar Shave Club ===
Dollar Shave Club launched with early investments and support from Science Inc. Science Inc. was Dollar Shave Club's first investor, before the startup raised a $1 million seed round in March 2012. It was acquired by Unilever in 2016.

=== DogVacay ===
Initial funding for DogVacay was obtained from Science Inc. DogVacay is a Santa Monica-based company known for home dog boarding and other pet services.

=== HelloSociety ===
Science Inc. funded an incubated HelloSociety, a social media marketing and technology firm that consults on strategic partnerships with influencers and market analytics. The company was purchased by The New York Times in March 2016.

=== Plowz and Mowz ===
In 2016, Science Inc. became one of the first investors in Plowz & Mowz, a gig-marketplace website and app that connects consumers with freelance landscapers. The company began by offering residential snow plowing services and has since expanded its scope to lawn mowing and over a dozen other outdoor home services.

=== Other ===
Other startups that have come from Science Inc. include HomeHero, FameBit, Hello.Me, Stunner Inc., Delicious, PlayHaven, Kyoku, Wishbone, and Quarterly. In 2015, Science Inc. sold off its mobile advertising network PlayHaven to mobile game publisher RockYou. In 2016, FameBit was acquired by Google.
