= Dogmopolite =

Hungarian pet services provider

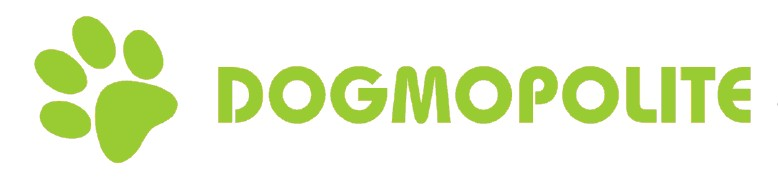

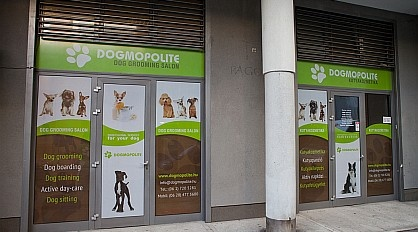
- Company type: Privately held company
- Industry: Pet services
- Founded: 2010
- Founder: Péter Gárdos
- Headquarters: Budapest, Hungary
- Area served: Hungary
- Owner: Péter Gárdos
- Number of employees: 30–50
- Website: https://www.dogmopolite.hu/hu/

Dogmopolite is a Hungarian canine pet services provider chain that offers dog boarding, dog daycare and dog grooming services, among others. The company group operates nine locations in Budapest, Szigetszentmiklós, Szentendre and Debrecen, Hungary. It opened a veterinary clinic in 2023 in Budapest, in district XII, and offers, in addition, dog walking, dog training, dog swimming, and dog transportation and physiotherapy services. Dogmopolite was founded in 2010 by Péter Gárdos; the Dogmopolite group currently employs 30–50 people. The company started out as a dog-walking venture and has since grown steadily, providing almost all services in the canine business, with an annual revenue of tens of millions of HUF.
