= Pet Sitters International =

American educational association

PSI
- Pet Sitters International, Inc.
- Formation: 1994; 32 years ago
- Founder: Patti J. Moran
- Founded at: North Carolina
- Legal status: Corporation
- Location: King, North Carolina
- Region served: United States
- Staff: 6 (2020)
- Website: www.petsit.com

Pet Sitters International (PSI) is an educational association for professional pet sitters located in King, North Carolina. The professional pet-sitting association represents nearly 4,000 independent professional pet-sitting and dog-walking businesses. PSI was established in 1994 by Patti J. Moran, author of Pet Sitting for Profit.

In 2016, PSI received the Torch Award for Ethics from the Better Business Bureau of Northwest North Carolina.

Caring for pets in their own home is what separates pet sitters from boarders and dog daycare. Dog walking is considered to be a form of pet sitting as well since it involves visiting the pet's home to provide exercise and companionship.

Other activities include:

- In 1997, Pet Sitters International successfully campaigned to have "pet sitting" added to the Random House Dictionary.
- In 1999, Pet Sitters International created Take Your Dog to Work Day. It is celebrated the Friday following Father's Day.
- In 2010, Pet Sitters International partnered with Garfield to promote professional pet sitting.

== Association membership ==
According to the organization's website, Pet Sitters International offers United States and Canadian members pet-sitter liability insurance.

Their website also indicates that the organization provides educational resources to its members, including free member webinars, e-books, weekly emails and a subscription to their member magazine in print and digital formats. It offers a certification program to become a Certified Professional Pet Sitter. The designation name is federally trademarked .

It offers members discounts on business tools including background checks and staffing/hiring tools, and maintains an online directory of professional pet sitters that pet owners can search at no cost.
