= Liquid Death =

Canned water company

Supplying Demand, Inc.
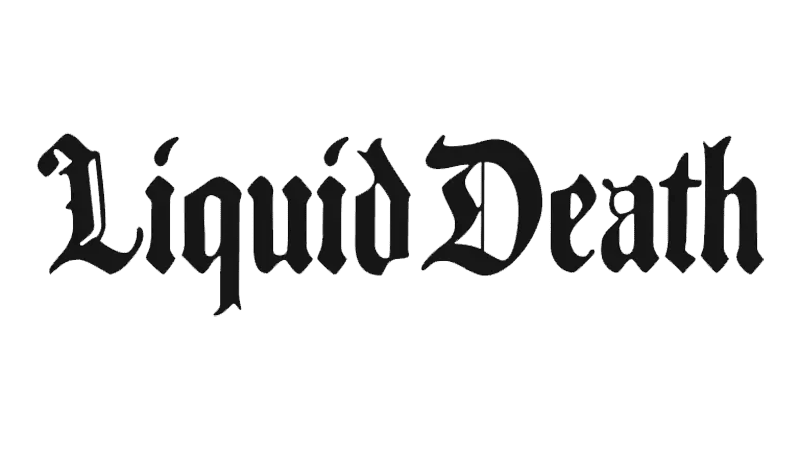
- Trade name: Liquid Death
- Founded: December 18, 2018; 7 years ago
- Founder: Mike Cessario
- Headquarters: Los Angeles, California, U.S.
- Products: Canned water; sparkling water; iced tea; energy drink
- Subsidiaries: Supplying Demand UK Limited
- Website: liquiddeath.com

Supplying Demand, Inc., doing business as Liquid Death, is a canned water company founded by Mike Cessario, headquartered in Los Angeles, California, United States. Its tagline is "murder your thirst". The drink is sold in a 12 US fl oz (350 ml), 16.9 US fl oz (500 ml) "tallboy" drink can and a 19.2 US fl oz (570 ml) can. As of 2023, its water was canned by Wilderness Asset Holdings LLC in Virginia, US. The drink began selling to consumers on its website in January 2019. In March 2024, the company was valued at $1.4 billion. Liquid Death currently has 14 flavors.

== Products ==
Liquid Death Mountain Water Sparkling Drinking Water

The drink is sold in a 16.9 US fl oz (500 ml) "tallboy" drink can. In 2020, the brand introduced a sparkling water variety. Its manufacturer is Supplying Demand, Inc. In addition to the original sparkling water, Liquid Death introduced four flavored carbonated beverages: Mango Chainsaw, Severed Lime, Convicted Melon, and Berry It Alive. Unlike their unflavored seltzer, these carbonated beverages ("sparkling waters") are akin to all-natural, low-calorie sodas as they contain added natural flavorings/extracts, natural acidulants and natural added sugar (from agave nectar). The sugar sparkling waters have around 20 calories each. In March 2023, the company announced three new tea flavors: Grim Leafer, Rest in Peach, and Dead Billionaire. Dead Billionaire was originally called Armless Palmer, a play on the popular iced tea and lemonade beverage Arnold Palmer, but changed the name after Arizona Beverage Company threatened to sue for commercial use of the Palmer name in November 2023. Up until early 2025, all tea flavors contained agave nectar and 30 mg of caffeine. In early 2025, the company began to add stevia to its teas causing significant backlash from long time consumers on the change citing the undue sweetness and harsh stevia aftertaste.

Liquid Death is a producer of NFTs, which they called Murder Head Death Club.

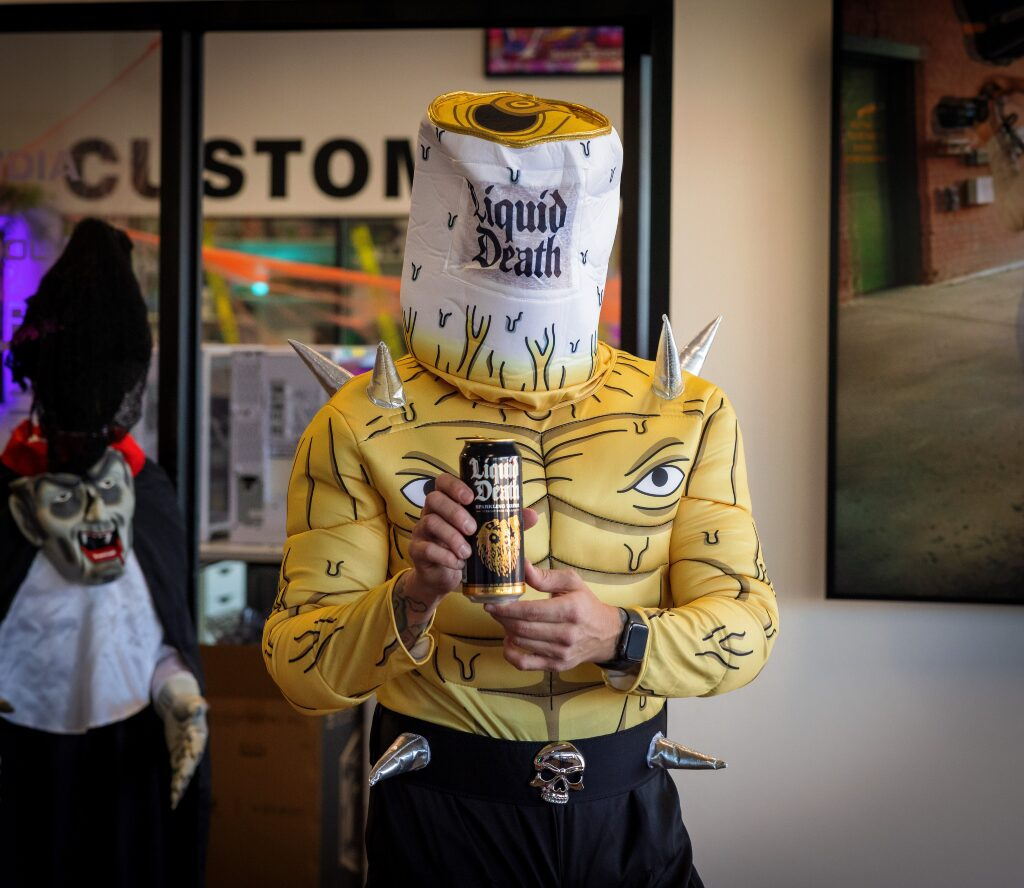
Halloween Party 2022 Liquid Death costume

As of 2023, its water was no longer sourced from the Alps. It is now bottled in Bland, Virginia or Mackay, Idaho (according to the label on the cans).

On July 17, 2025, it was announced that Liquid Death would launch a line of energy drinks in January 2026 as "better-for-you energy drink line." These drinks contain 100 mg of caffeine. In an interview with The Wall Street Journal, Liquid Death's founder, Mike Cessario, stated, "We thought, ‘Let’s have a sane level of caffeine, that’s equal to a cup of coffee, because it seems like the category has gone a little caffeine-crazy". They also do not contain sugar or artificial sweeteners like sucralose and aspartame. Four flavors were confirmed for the launch (Tropical Terror, Scary Strawberry, Orange Horror, and Murder Mystery).

== History ==
Delaware native Mike Cessario, a graphic designer, was inspired to create Liquid Death after watching a Vans Warped Tour in 2009 where concertgoers drank water out of Monster Energy cans. Cessario was inspired to market water in a manner similar to Monster.

The company originated with Cessario and three other partners, including a bartender and an artist. Before he and his partners chose the name Liquid Death, they thought over different names for the company (such as "Southern Thunder"). Cessario filed a trademark application for the term "Liquid Death" with the United States Patent and Trademark Office on July 6, 2017. He produced a video advertisement of a "girl with braids waterboarding a man," which was later banned, to gauge market interest in the product, which received three million views before the water was available to consumers for purchase. Within a few months of release, the company had over 100,000 "likes" on Facebook, more than brands such as Aquafina had generated in their history on the platform.

In 2019, Cessario stated the company's plan was to expand to bars, tattoo parlors, and certain barber shops in Los Angeles and Philadelphia as a "lifestyle play". A move similar to The Coca-Cola Company's attempt to sell OK Soda on "feeling" rather than taste. Cessario stated the brand was initially marketed towards straight edge adherents and fans of heavy metal music and punk rock. The drink began selling to consumers on its website in January 2019. Liquid Death raised US$1.6 million in seed funding from a round led by Science Inc. in 2019 (for a total amount raised to $2.25 million at that point), $9 million in a series A round in February 2020, and $23 million in a series B round in September 2020.

In February 2020, the brand expanded into Whole Foods Market in the United States, where according to Eater it became "the fastest-selling water brand on its shelves". In August 2020, the brand expanded into two hundred 7-Eleven stores in the Los Angeles and San Diego markets as part of a trial run. In May 2021, the company raised an additional $15 million in a Series C funding round completed with Live Nation, who said they would sell the drink exclusively in their events and venues for a period of time. As of December 2021, the drink began selling in large supermarket chains such as Publix and Sprouts stores. In January 2022, the company raised $75 million in Series C funding. The company received a $525 million valuation at the time.

Cessario stated that the company's revenue rose to $45 million in 2021, with revenue projected at $130 million for 2022. (Note: Projection made in October 2022) In October 2022, the company raised a round led by Science for $70 million at a $700 million valuation, though according to Dan Primack of Axios, the valuation could be viewed "skeptically" as it was an insider-led round.

In March 2024, the company raised $67 million in funding and received a $1.4 billion valuation. Liquid Death also reported $263 million in retail sales for 2023.

== Promotions ==
In May 2020, the company released Greatest Hates, an album of death metal music created with lyrics from hate comments the company received online; a second album of hate comments, described as "punk rock", was released in November. In February 2022, during Super Bowl LVI, the company released an advertisement featuring children enjoying the beverage with Judas Priest's song "Breaking the Law". Parodying advertisements for alcoholic beverages, the advertisement ends with the tagline "Don't be scared, it's just water".

Liquid Death was mentioned in the 2025 adaptation of The Running Man, where it is an in-universe sponsor for the show.

Steve-O from the TV and movie series Jackass promotes Liquid Death on his YouTube videos as of May 2026.

== See also ==
- List of bottled water brands
