= Bottled water =

Water sold as a bottled product

An unlabeled plastic bottle of water

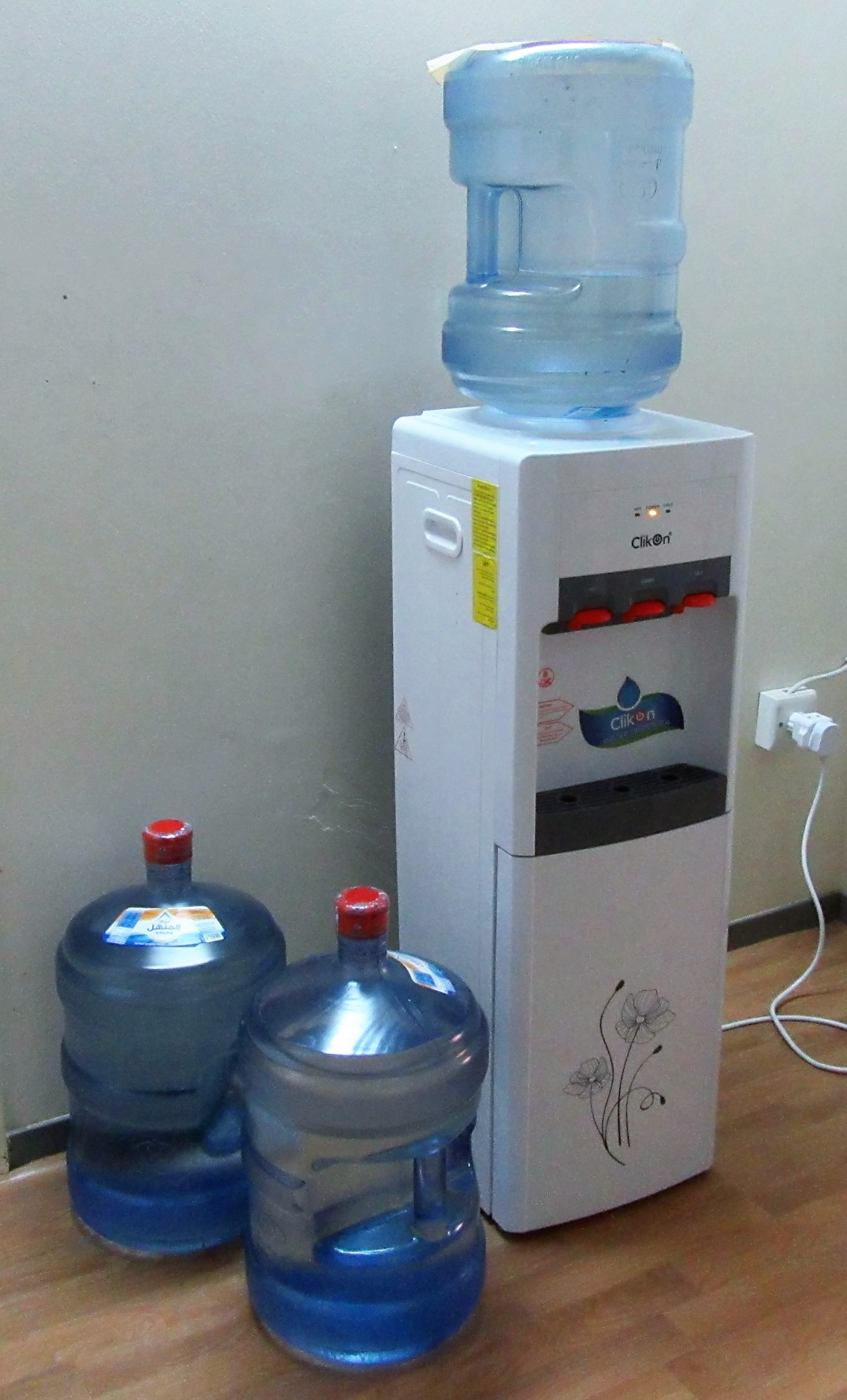
Bottled water dispensed in a water cooler

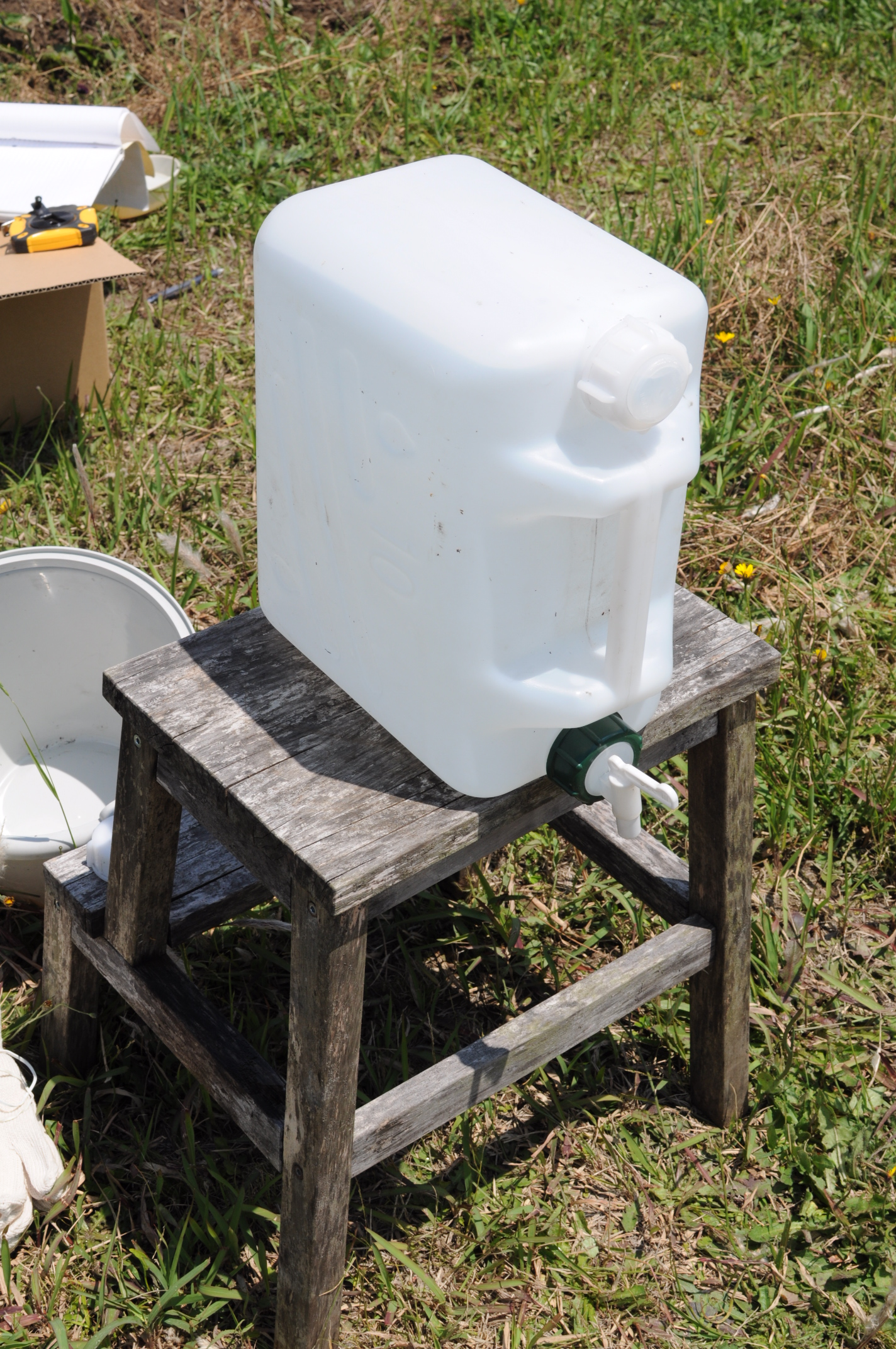
A portable water container with a tap on bottom

Bottled water is drinking water (e.g., well water, distilled water, reverse osmosis water, mineral water, or spring water) packaged in plastic or glass water bottles. Bottled water may be carbonated or not with packaging sizes ranging from small single-serving bottles to large carboys for water coolers. The consumption of bottled water is influenced by factors such as convenience, taste, perceived safety, and concerns over the quality of municipal tap water. Concerns about the environmental impact of bottled water, including the production and disposal of plastic bottles, have led to calls for more sustainable practices in the industry. Some brands have attempted to address the problem of microplastics and chemicals by canning purified water.

== History ==
Although vessels to bottle and transport water were part of the earliest human civilizations, bottling water began in the United Kingdom with the first water bottling at the Holy Well in 1622. The demand for bottled water was fueled in large part by the resurgence in spa-going and water therapy among Europeans and American colonists in the 17th and 18th centuries. 'Bristol Water' taken from the spa at Hotwells was one of the first drinking waters to be bottled and marketed widely. Daniel Defoe noted in 1724 that there were over 15 glasshouses in Bristol, "which are more than in London...and vast numbers of bottles are used for sending the water of the Hotwell not only over England but all over the world." The first commercially distributed water in America was bottled and sold by Jackson's Spa in Boston in 1767. Early drinkers of bottled spa waters believed that the water at these mineral springs had therapeutic properties and that bathing in or drinking the water could help treat many common ailments.

The popularity of bottled mineral waters quickly led to a market for imitation products. Carbonated waters developed to reproduce the natural effervescence of spring-bottled water, and in 1809 Joseph Hawkins was issued the first U.S. patent for "imitation" mineral water. Technological innovation in the 19th century led to cheaper glass and quicker bottling. So bottled water could be produced on a larger scale and grew in popularity. Many saw bottled water as safer than municipal water supplies, which could spread diseases such as cholera and typhoid. By around 1850, one of America's most popular bottlers, Saratoga Springs, was producing more than 7 million bottles of water annually.

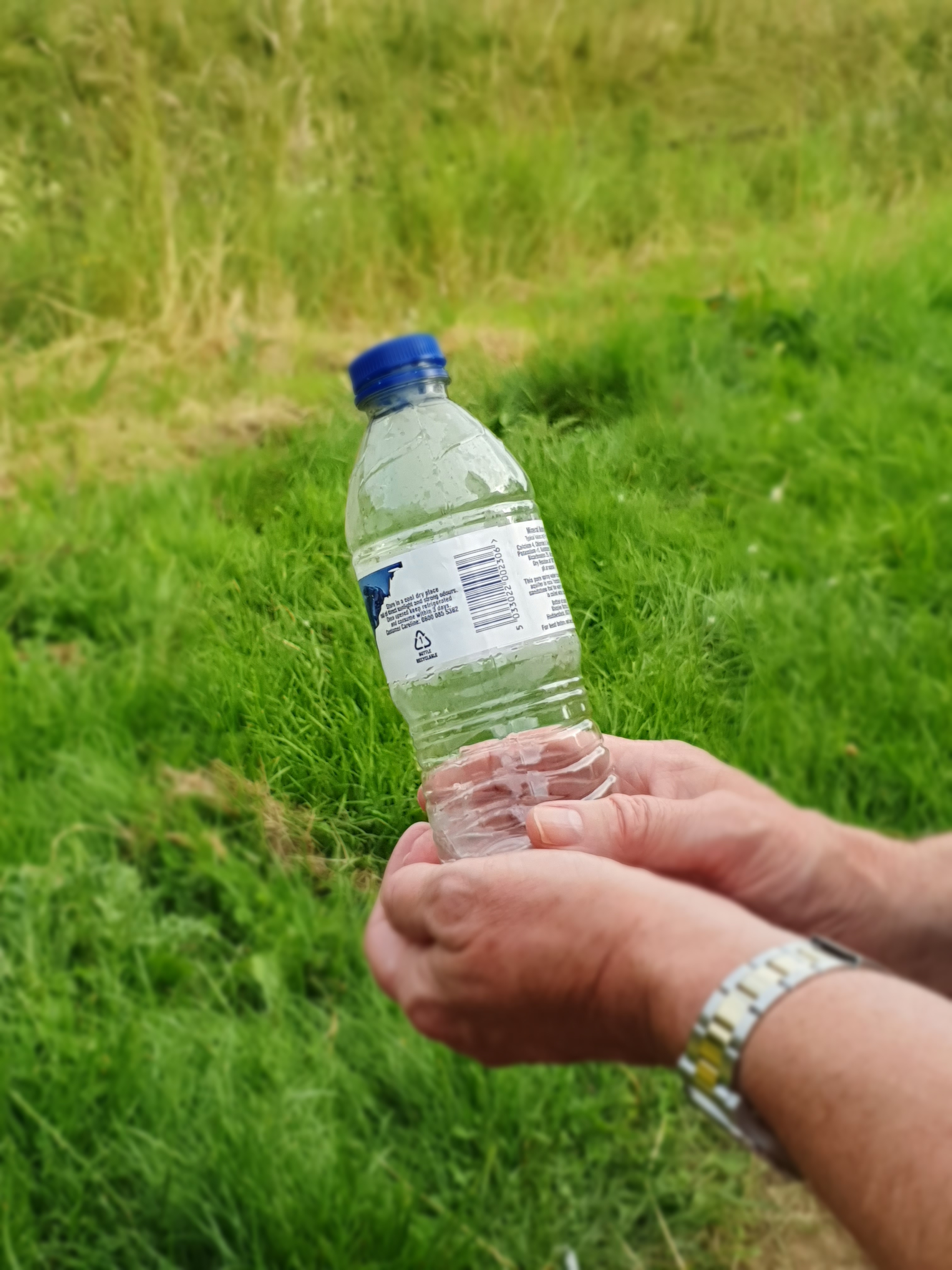
Bottled water

In the United States, the popularity of bottled water declined in the early 20th century, when the advent of water chlorination reduced public concerns about water-borne diseases in municipal water supplies. But it remained popular in Europe, where it spread to cafés and grocery stores in the second half of the century. Perrier water had been bottled since the 19th century and widely sold throughout the British Empire; in 1977 Perrier launched in the United States. Today, bottled water is the most popular commercial beverage in the United States, with about 25% of the consumption share versus 18.7% for soft drinks.

=== Water chemistry ===
Many of the early developments in the field of chemistry can be attributed to the study of natural mineral waters and attempts to replicate them for commercial sale. Joseph Priestley, who discovered oxygen in 1775, made his first contributions to the field of chemistry by dissolving carbon dioxide in water, for which he was awarded the Copley Medal in 1773. He later worked with Johann Jacob Schweppe, founder of Schweppes, in developing "aerated" waters for commercial sale.

=== PET plastic bottles ===
In 1973, DuPont engineer Nathaniel Wyeth patented Polyethylene terephthalate (PET) bottles, the first plastic bottle to withstand the pressure of carbonated liquids. Today, PET plastic has replaced glass as the preferred material for single-serving bottled water containers due to its light weight and resistance to breaking.

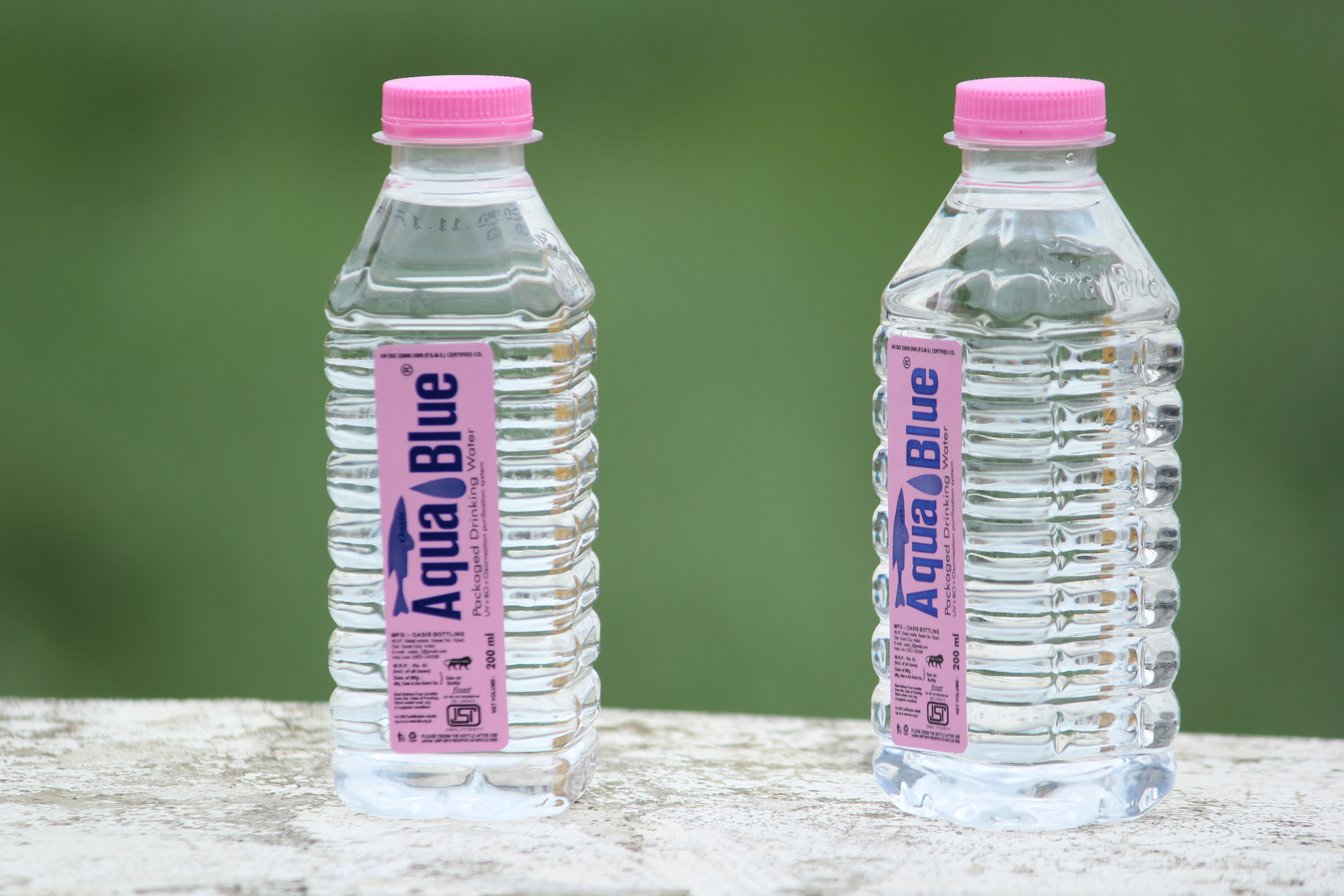
PET Plastic Bottle Water

The mere fact of lightweight single-use packaging and one-way shipping caused the revolution in water marketing that by the late 1990s had spread from the U.S. and Europe to around the world.

== Types ==
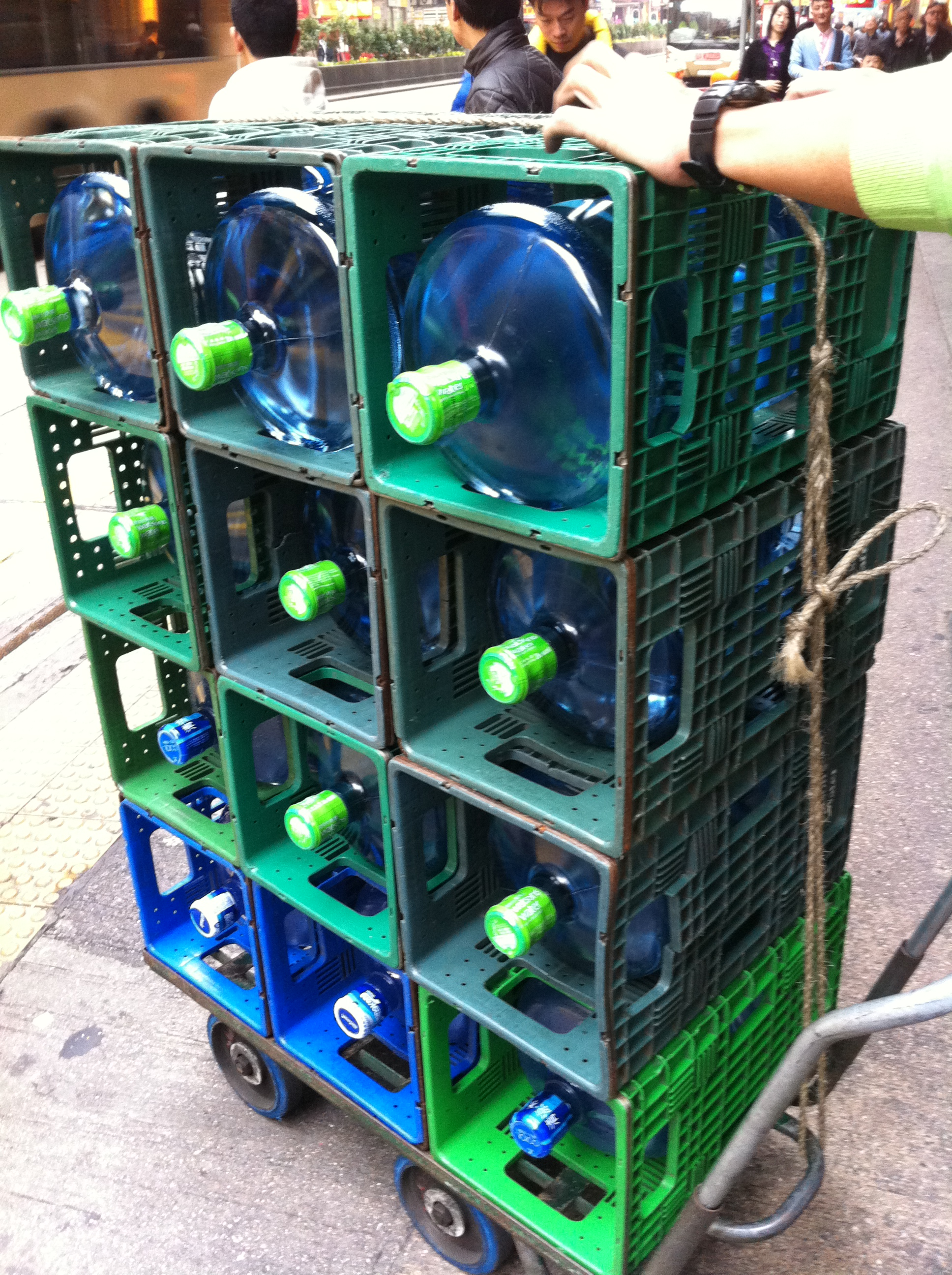
Distilled, purified water, in Hong Kong

Some of the more common types of bottled water are:

- Alkaline water – this type of water has increased pH levels produced through electrolysis
- Artesian water – this is water that originates from a confined aquifer that has been tapped and in which the water level stands at some height above the top of the aquifer and flows naturally to the surface. This water is at a pressure greater than atmospheric pressure, so it flows naturally from the surface or pipe.
- Fluoridated – this type of water contains added fluoride. This category includes water classified as "For Infants" or "Nursery."
- Groundwater – this type of water is from an underground source such as a well. This can include Artesian water sources.
- Mineral water – water from a mineral spring that contains various minerals, such as salts and sulfur compounds. It comes from a source tapped at one or more bore holes or spring, and originates from a geologically and physically protected underground water source. No minerals may be added to this water.
- Purified water – this type of water has been produced by distillation, deionization, reverse osmosis, or other suitable processes. Purified water may also be referred to as "demineralized water".
- Sparkling water – Sparkling water contains the same amount of carbon dioxide that it had at emergence from the source. The carbon dioxide may be removed and replenished after treatment.
- Spring water – this type of water comes from an underground formation from which water flows naturally to the Earth's surface.
- Sterile water – this type of water meets sterilization requirements, for example, those specified under "sterility tests" in the United States Pharmacopoeia.
- Well water – well water is taken from a hole tapping, etc. This hole may be bored, drilled, or otherwise constructed in the ground.

== Product forms ==
The Beverage Marketing Corporation defines the bottled water market segment as "retail PET, retail bulk, home and office delivery, vending, domestic sparkling and imports", but excluding "flavored and enhanced water."

=== Purified water vending machines ===
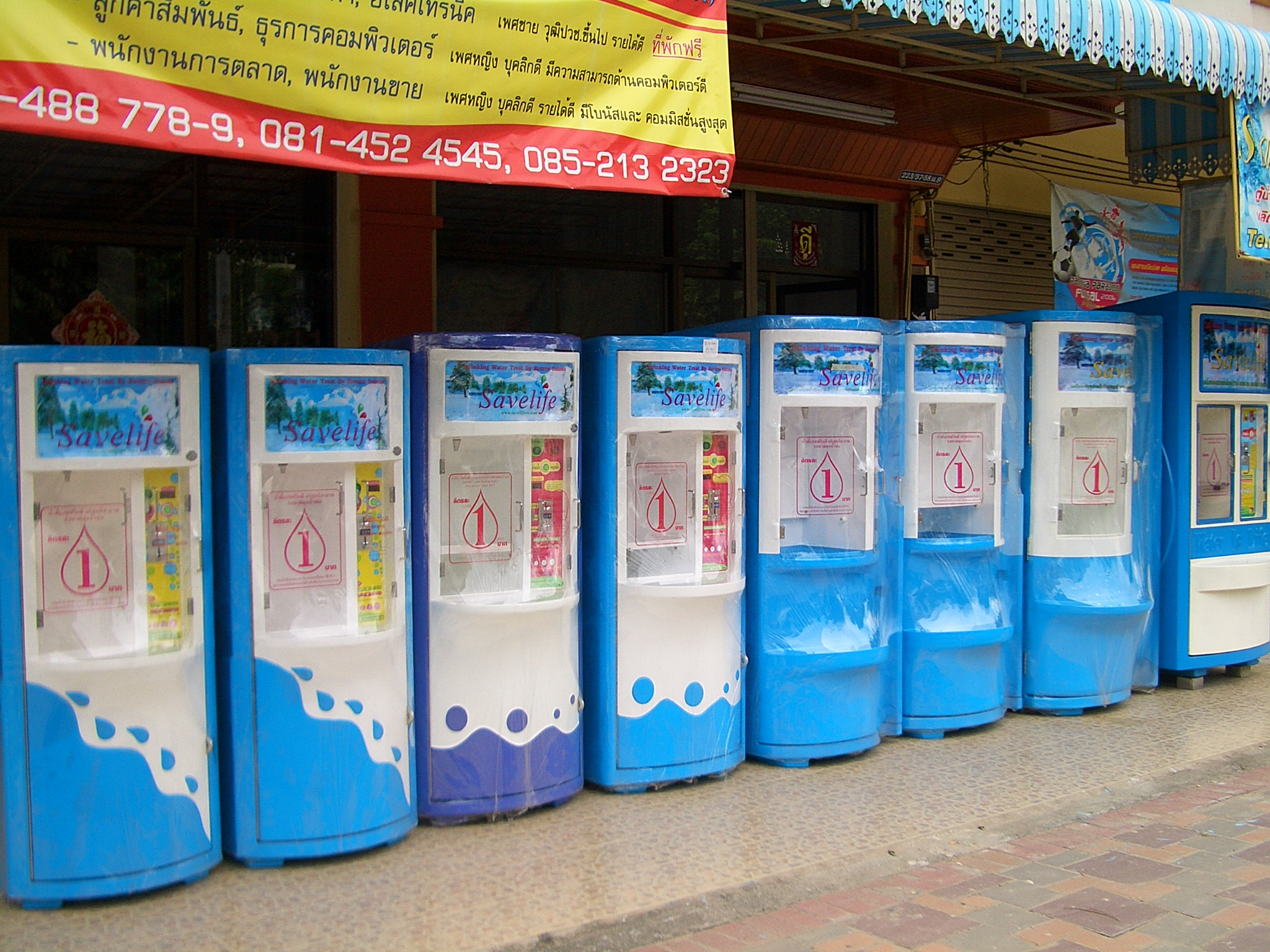
A bottle-less drinking water vending machine in Pattaya, Thailand. Customers bring their containers.

A number of cities and companies worldwide have vending machines that dispense purified water into customers' own containers. All dispensers filter the location's tap water. In North America, these machines are typically located outside of supermarkets.

=== Bottled water service ===
Bottled water subscription services provide regular deliveries of water. Traditionally, water in glass bottles or jugs was provided to electric coolers in areas of businesses without plumbing. Plastic containers have superseded glass jugs, although dispensers at businesses may stand alongside existing water taps or fountains.

=== Storage ===
Bottled water is often stored as part of an emergency kit in case of natural disaster. The U.S. Federal Emergency Management Agency (FEMA) says the "safest" and "most reliable" source of drinking water is store-bought bottled water. Commonly, disaster management experts recommend storing 1-US-gallon (3.8 L) of water per person, per day for at least three days. This amount is intended to include water for drinking and cooking as well as water for hand washing, washing dishes, and personal hygiene. Factory containers of water have an indefinite shelf life, as long as they remain unopened and undamaged.

Because water has an indefinite shelf life, the sell-by date is voluntarily and individually set by manufacturers. In the United States, many manufactures print a two-year shelf life. This is a precautionary measure against the potential effects of degraded plastic. Manufactures also say that the dates indicate the length of time that they believe the water will taste and smell fresh, rather than to indicate any issue of contamination or food safety. Japanese manufacturers usually have one to two year date for normal bottles and five to ten years for those meant for long-term storage. This indicates the approximate guaranteed length the water content meets the Measurement Act as water slowly permeates and evaporates through the container. However, the law does not punish manufacturers if the content falls below the acceptable range after purchase.

== PET recycling ==
The most common packaging material for single-serve, non-carbonated bottled water in the United States and Europe is polyethylene terephthalate (PET) plastic. Marked in many countries with resin identification code number "1", PET is 100% recyclable, though recycling rates vary by region. In 2014, approximately 1.8 billion pounds of post-consumer PET bottles were collected in the United States and 1.75 million metric tons (approximately 3.9 billion pounds) were collected in the European Union, making it the most recycled plastic in both the United States and Europe. In the United States, the recycling rate for PET packaging was 32% in 2014; in the European Union, the recycling rate for PET packaging for the same period was approximately 52%.

The National Association for PET Container Resources (NAPCOR), the trade association for the PET plastic packaging industry in the United States and Canada, identifies five major, generic end-use categories for recycled PET plastic:

1. Packaging applications, including new bottles.
2. Sheet and film applications, including some thermoforming applications.
3. Strapping.
4. Engineered resins applications.
5. Fiber applications.

In Europe, more than one-third of recovered PET plastic is used to produce polyester fibers, and another quarter is used in the production of preformed plastic containers—such as egg cartons, fruit boxes, and other plastic beverage bottles.

== Water and energy usage ==
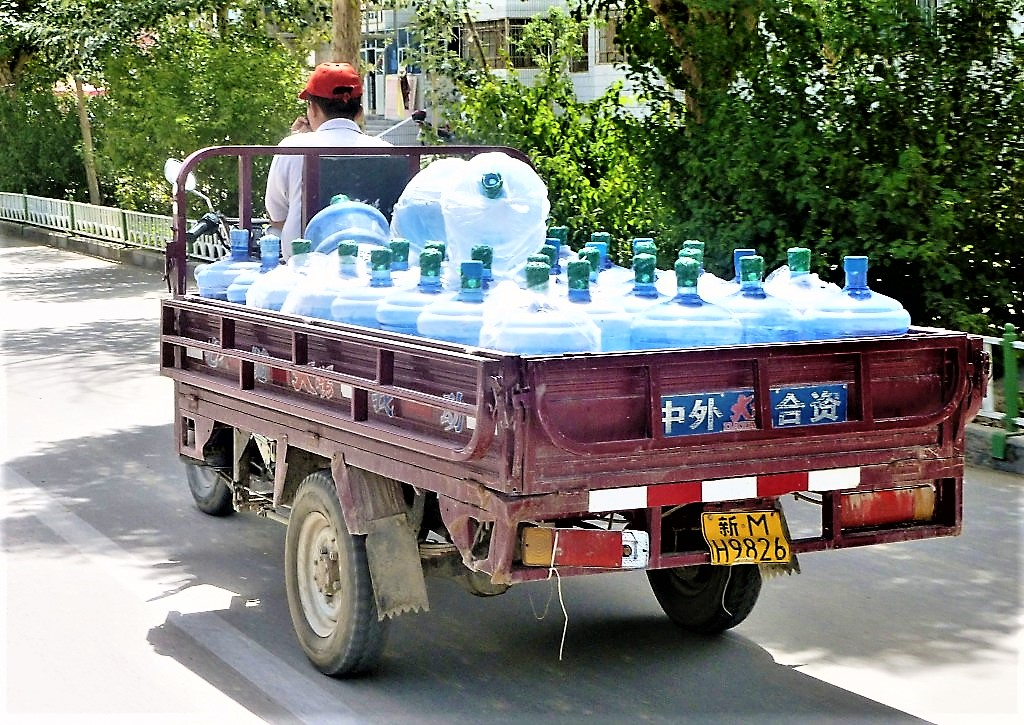
Bottled drinking water delivery, Qiemo, Xinjiang, China

On average, it takes 1.32 litres (L) of water to produce 1 L of bottled water. This includes 1 L of ingredient water and 0.32 L of water used in facility processes such as treatment, bottling, and maintenance. Small pack facilities (facilities that package water in containers between 8 oz. and 2.5 gallons) use the least amount of water (1.26 L per 1 L), followed by mixed packaging facilities (1.46 L per 1 L). Facilities that package water for home and office delivery in sizes of 2.5 gallons to 5 gallons use the most water (1.56 L per 1 L).

Bottled water has lower water usage than bottled soft drinks, which average 2.02 L per 1 L, as well as beer (4 L per 1 L) and wine (4.74 L per 1 L). The larger per-litre water consumption of these drinks can be attributed to additional ingredients and production processes, such as flavor mixing and carbonization for soft drinks and fermentation for beer and wine. In the United States, bottled water production represents 0.011% of annual water consumption.

Critics of bottled water argue that the industry should take in to account not just water used in its production and packaging process, but the total water footprint of its supply chain, which includes water used in the production of its packaging.

A 2011 IBWA lifecycle inventory study found that the production, packaging, and transportation of bottled water within the United States consumes 31.5 TWh (107.4 trillion Btu) of energy annually, which represents about 0.07% of yearly energy consumption in the country. According to the same study, 6.8 million tons of CO_{2} equivalent are emitted by the bottled water industry a year in the United States, about 0.08% of annual emissions. An Aetna Group study in 2015 concluded that each litre of bottled water requires 240 kilojoules of energy to produce. The lifecycle carbon footprint for a half litre of small pack bottled water is 111 grams CO_{2} equivalent. By comparison, the same sized PET plastic-bottled soft drink produces 240 grams CO_{2} equivalent. Soft drink bottles require much thicker plastic due to carbonation, and therefore many more grams of CO_{2} equivalent.

== Regulation ==
=== Bureau of Indian Standards – India ===
The Bureau of Indian Standards (BIS) is the national standards body of India working under the aegis of Ministry of Consumer Affairs, Food & Public Distribution, Government of India. It is established by the Bureau of Indian Standards Act, 1986 which came into effect on 23 December 1986. The minister in charge of the ministry or department having administrative control of the BIS is the ex-officio president of the BIS.

=== Food and Drug Administration – US ===
Bottled water is comprehensively regulated by the U.S. Food and Drug Administration (FDA) as a packaged food product. By law, the FDA regulations for bottled water must be at least as stringent as the Environmental Protection Agency standards for tap water.

The FDA has established "Standards of Identity" for bottled water products sold in the U.S. For a product to be considered "bottled water", it cannot contain sweeteners or chemical additives (other than flavors, extracts or essences) and must be calorie-free and sugar-free. If flavors, extracts and essences—derived from spice or fruit—are added to the water, these additions must comprise less than 1% by weight of the final product. The FDA Code of Federal Regulations establishes limitations for the amount of fluoride that can be added to water. Mineral water contains at least 250 parts per million total dissolved solids (TDS). "Purified water" is defined in the United States Pharmacopoeia.

=== Food Standards Code – Australia & New Zealand ===
Food Standards Australia New Zealand's Food Standards Code limits fluoride in bottled water to between 0.6 and 1.0 milligrams per litre, and requires any addition to be specified on the product label.

=== Industry reform – Canada ===
The Council of Canadians, a social action organization, stressed the need for bottled water industry reform after launching a boycott of Nestlé in September 2016 after the company outbid a small town aiming to secure a long-term water supply through a local well as the country battles drought and depletion of ground water reserves. Premier Kathleen Wynne stated that her government will look for ways to put community needs ahead of bottled water corporations, saying "as we look at the water bottling industry, that has to be a question because we're talking about what we could argue is our most precious resource" that they have this "discussion about our water, the status of and the treatment of water bottling companies, that needs to be taken into consideration".

== Markets ==
=== Global sales ===
Global bottled water consumption crossed the 3 billion hectoliter threshold in 2014. In 2017, the global rate of consumption rose by an estimated 7.6 percent. Per capita consumption was 50.1 liters, up by 3 liters from 2016's 47.1 liters.

=== Australia ===
The Australasian Bottled Water Institute is a regional member of the International Council of Bottled Water Associations. The bottled water industry in Australia is worth approximately $400 million per year,

An upmarket restaurant in Sydney has stopped selling bottled water and started using a machine costing A$5000 to filter, chill and carbonate tap water to get the same quality water.

Despite ongoing water restrictions, an application to extract groundwater for bottled water was approved in 2020.

=== China ===
- The revenue generated in the Bottled Water market in 2023 amounts to US$72.5bn.
- This market is projected to grow annually by 6.75% from 2023 to 2027, according to the Compound Annual Growth Rate (CAGR).
- In global comparison, in the United States leads the way in terms of revenue, with US$94bn generated in 2023.
- When considering the total population figures, per person revenues in the Bottled Water market reach US$49.63 in 2023

=== European Union ===
EU Directive 2009/54/EC deals with the marketing and exploitation of natural mineral waters in the European Union. The two main types of bottled water recognized are mineral water and spring water.

Broadly speaking, "mineral water" is groundwater that has emerged from the ground and flowed over rock. Treatment of mineral water is restricted to removal of unstable elements such as iron and sulfur compounds. Treatment for such minerals may extend only to filtration or decanting with oxygenation. Free carbon dioxide may be removed only by physical methods, and the regulations for introduction (or reintroduction) of CO_{2} are strictly defined. Disinfection of natural mineral water is completely prohibited, including the addition of any element that is likely to change bacterial colony counts. If natural mineral water is effervescent, it must be labelled accordingly, depending on the origin of the carbon dioxide: naturally carbonated natural mineral water (no introduction of CO_{2}); natural mineral water fortified with gas from the spring (reintroduction of CO_{2}); carbonated natural mineral water (CO_{2} added following strict guidelines).

Directive 2001/83/EC deals with bottled water that is considered a "medicinal product" and is thus excluded from the scope of the other regulation.

=== India ===
The bottled water industry in India witnessed a boom in the late 1990s soon after Bisleri launched its packaged drinking water in the country. This significant growth was fuelled by a surge in advertising by the industry players that "bottled water was pure and healthy".

The total market was valued at ₹60 billion (US$640 million) in 2013, of which the top five players (Bisleri, PepsiCo, Coca-Cola and Parle) accounted for 67% of the market share. This market is expected to grow at a CAGR of 22%, to reach ₹160 billion (US$1.7 billion) in 2018.

In 2016, the state of Sikkim announced restrictions on the usage of plastic water bottles (in government functions and meetings) and styrofoam products as it is associated with adverse health and environment impacts.

=== Lebanon ===
Lebanon has one of the fastest growth rate of per capita consumption of bottled water. Lebanon has seven major brands of bottled mineral water for local consumption and for exportation to the water-starved countries on the Arabian Peninsula and in the Persian Gulf.

=== New Zealand ===
Bottled water in New Zealand is regulated by Food Standards Australia New Zealand and must comply with the Food Act 1981. From July 2009 fluoride was allowed to be present in bottled water as an additive or as a natural occurring mineral.

=== Pakistan ===
Due to contaminated water being widespread, in the mid-1980s urban families started installing filtration units at home. This later developed into companies providing mineral water delivery services at home. Use of these 1-US-gallon (3.8 L) bottles that could be attached to a dispenser is still widespread.

Bottled water was made famous by one of the largest marketing campaigns in Pakistan history undertaken by Nestle. In 1998, Pakistan became the birthplace for the Nestle Pure Life bottled water brand. Other bottlers include dozens of local ones, Coca-Cola, Pepsi, Mineral Drops by water icon, Nature, Vey, Nova Pure Water Larkana, Mina Water, Great Water Islamabad, Murree Sparklettes and Dew Drop. Other imported brands such as Evian also began marketing in the country.

=== United States ===
The U.S. is the second largest consumer market for bottled water in the world, followed by Mexico, Indonesia, and Brazil. China surpassed the United States to take the lead in 2013. In 2016, bottled water outsold carbonated soft drinks (by volume) to become the number one packaged beverage in the U.S. In 2018, bottled water consumption increased to 14 billion gallons, up 5.8 percent from 2017, with the average American drinking 41.9 gallons of bottled water annually.

In the United States, bottled water and tap water are regulated by different federal agencies: the Food and Drug Administration (FDA) regulates bottled water and the Environmental Protection Agency (EPA) regulates the quality of tap water. The International Bottled Water Association (IBWA) is headquartered in Alexandria, Virginia.

From 1970 (16 brands) over 1998 (50 brands) to 2012 (195 brands), the number of mineral water brands in the U.S. has grown exponentially.

== Consumer information ==
=== Labeling ===
In the United States, the Food and Drug Administration (FDA) regulates all packaged foods and beverage products, including bottled water, and mandates labeling requirements. FDA labeling requirements include a statement of the type of water in the container, compliance with the applicable definitions in the FDA Standards of Identity, ingredient labeling, name and place of business of the manufacturer, packer or distributor, net weight, and, if required, nutrition labeling.

=== Consumer information ===
Public water systems are required by the U.S. Environmental Protection Agency (EPA) to provide households in their service territories with a Consumer Confidence Report (CCR) that provides information on the quality of their water during the previous year. Such disclosures are not required by the FDA of any packaged food or beverage product, including bottled water. All packaged foods and beverages, must be manufactured according to FDA regulations and must meet all applicable quality and safety standards.

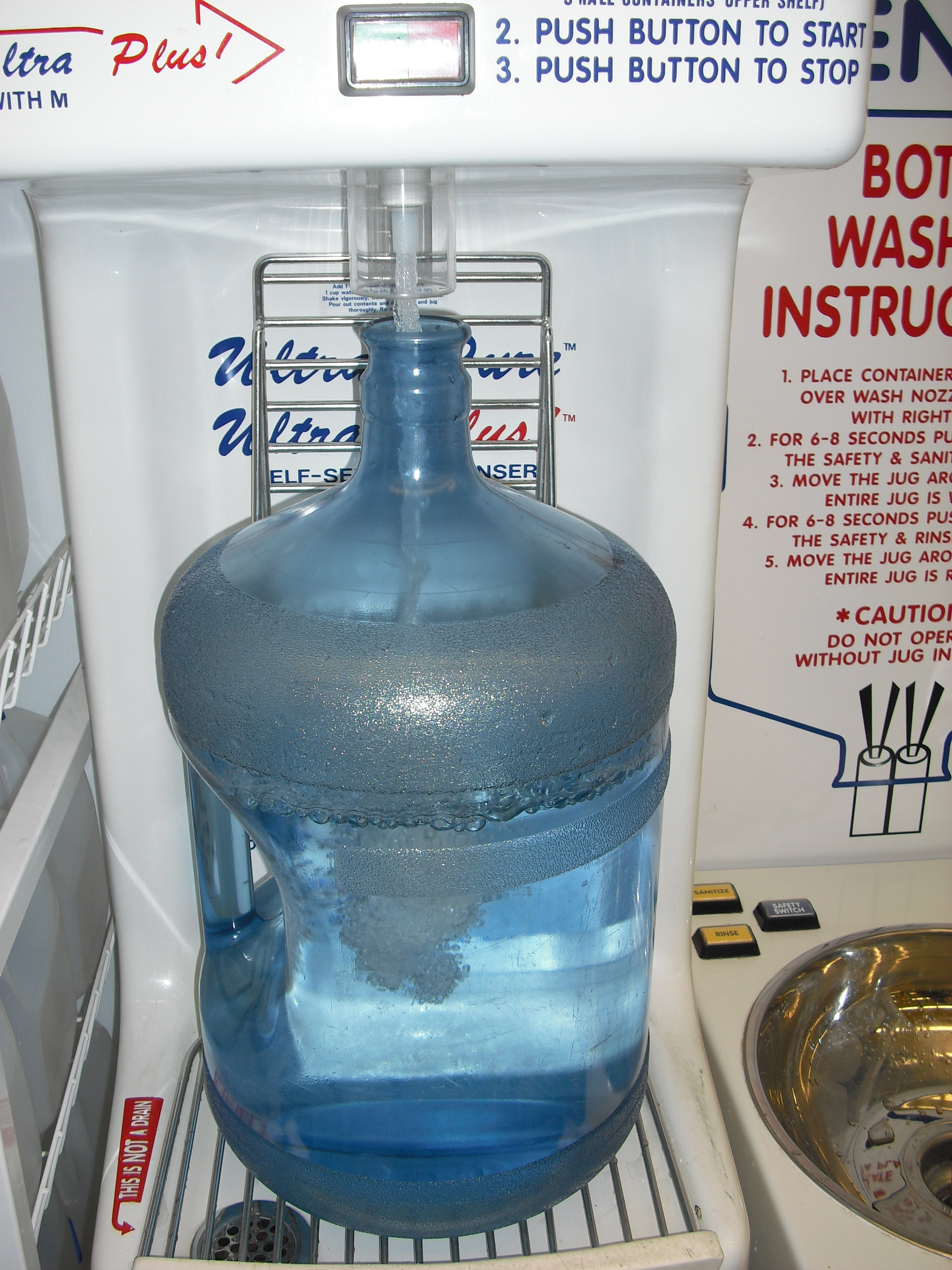
A bottled water refill station in a Canadian grocery store

In Canada, bottled water must meet the standards in the Food and Drugs Act & Regulations (FDAR) as it is considered a food. The FDAR works in partnership with Health Canada and Canadian in developing the policies regarding bottled water. The CFIA focuses more on regulations pertaining to packaging, labeling, advertising, and other safety practices, whereas the FDAR focuses more on the water itself. For example, the bottled water must meet the Food Inspection Agency (CFIA) Regulations in Division 12, Part B of the Act must be met before it is approved for sale. Some of the regulations include: labeling terms, safety standards (i.e.: what is acceptable), and microbiological standards (i.e.: chlorine). In addition to this, the type of filtration method the water has gone through must be shown on the label, as stated in Section B.12.009 Additional information regarding regulations can be found on the CFIA website. The regulations specific to bottled water is in Division 12 and 15, which specify what can be added, such as the amount of arsenic and lead. Regulations are always being updated to conform with new scientific data, laws, new products, and new improvements. In terms of the types of water sold, spring and mineral water must meet the following criteria:

- originate from an underground source which is not part of a community water supply; and
- be naturally fit to drink (potable) at the source; and
- before bottling, not be treated in any way that changes the original chemical composition of the water. (The allowable treatments are discussed in section 1.2.)

In Canada, there are two categories of bottled water: 1) spring/mineral water, or 2) water other than mineral water or spring water.

== Emergency preparedness ==
Emergency preparedness refers to the steps taken prior to a natural disaster or emergency to ensure safety throughout the event. The American Red Cross and Federal Emergency Management Agency (FEMA) recommend that individuals and families maintain disaster supply kits in the event that an emergency disrupts food supply or public water systems, blocks roads, or leaves people unable to find essentials. Following disasters such as floods, blizzards, or earthquakes, water sources can be cut off or contaminated, limiting access to safe, clean drinking water. For this reason, FEMA recommends that all disaster supply kits include one gallon of water per person per day for at least three days for drinking and sanitation. In hot climates, FEMA recommends doubling this quantity.

For the water supply, FEMA recommends commercially bottled water kept in a cool, dark place. As an alternative, FEMA recommends using disinfected food-grade water containers to store tap water and replacing the water every six months.

=== Contamination ===
In August 2014, city officials in Toledo, Ohio banned local tap water after toxins from an algae bloom in Lake Erie were found in the city's water supply. The American Red Cross and AmeriCares responded by helping coordinate the distribution of bottled water to the 500,000 area residents impacted by the ban.

The city of Flint, Michigan supplied bottled water to its residents for four years after it was discovered that the city's tap water supply was contaminated with lead, and elevated levels of total trihalomethanes (TTHM) – cancer-causing chemicals that are by-products of the chlorination of water. In addition, the contaminated tap water was blamed for a major outbreak of Legionnaires' disease, according to the Natural Resources Defense Council.

== Concerns ==
Most bottled water containers are made from recyclable PET plastic, and most of these bottles end up in the waste stream in landfills. The financial and environmental costs of transportation of bottled water has been another concern because of the energy used and the consequent release of carbon dioxide and the potential impact on climate change.

Bottled water is bought for many different reasons including taste, convenience, poor tap water quality and safety concerns, health concerns and as a substitute for sugary drinks. The environmental impact, container safety, water origin, emergency supplies and role of the bottled water industry continue to be areas of concern for many people. In some cases it can be shown that bottled water is actually tap water. However, it is also argued that the quality specifications for some bottled waters in some jurisdictions are more stringent than the standards for tap-water. In the US, bottled water that comes from municipal suppliers must be clearly labeled as such unless it has been sufficiently processed to be labeled as "distilled" or "purified".

One American study showed that "even in areas with safe tap water, African American and Latino parents were three times more likely to give their children mostly bottled water compared to non-Latino white children, because of their belief that bottled water is safer, cleaner, better tasting, or more convenient." The economic implications of this also showed serious inequities: as a percentage of household income, whites reported median spending of 0.4% of their income on bottled water; African Americans and Latinos reported median spending to be more than twice as high." The study volunteers, "For poor families, the use of bottled water may lead to less availability of resources for other health needs ... by the rather striking levels of expenditure on water relative to household income." On a global scale, markets for bottled water in poorer developing countries are growing rapidly due to increased fears of "contaminated tap water, inadequate municipal water systems, and increased marketing on the part of bottled water companies." Sales of bottled water in Mexico, China, and parts of India are rising steeply.

=== Perceptions about bottled water ===
Bottled water is perceived by many as being a safer alternative to other sources of water such as tap water. Bottled water usage has increased even in countries where clean tap water is present. This may be attributed to consumers disliking the taste of tap water or its organoleptics. Another contributing factor to this shift could be the marketing success of bottled water. The success of bottled water marketing can be seen by Perrier's transformation of a bottle of water into a status symbol. However, while bottled water has grown in both consumption and sales, the industry's advertising expenses are considerably less than other beverages. According to the Beverage Marketing Corporation (BMC), in 2013, the bottled water industry spent $60.6 million on advertising. That same year, sports drinks spent $128 million, sodas spent $564 million, and beer spent $1 billion.

Consumers tend to choose bottled water due to health related reasons. In communities that experience problems with their tap water, bottled water consumption is significantly higher. The International Bottled Water Association guidelines state that bottled water companies cannot compare their product to tap water in marketing operations. Consumers are also affected by memories associated with particular brands. For example, Coca-Cola took their Dasani product off the UK market after finding levels of bromate that were higher than legal standards because consumers in the UK associated this flaw with the Dasani product.

"Bottled water sales are higher amongst African-American, Asians and Hispanic groups, which typically have lower incomes than whites." Some hypothesize that these differences are due to the geographic distribution of ethnic groups. It was theorized that ethnic differences in bottled water usage "mirror the variability of water system quality between urban, suburban and rural areas (Abrahams et al. 2000) and it was also pointed out that they might reflect the memory of past problems caused by deficient tap-water systems in deprived areas (Olson 1999)." In France, a similar geographic study in the early 1970s found that bottled water consumption was found to be much higher in urban areas (Ferrier 2001). This finding was "also explained in terms of the poor quality of urban tap water and of the bad condition of the old lead pipes in French cities. Nonetheless, while poor tap water quality may motivate the public to search for alternative sources, it alone does not necessarily lead to higher consumption of bottled water."

Some surveys "found that bottled water, far from being an alternative to tap water, seems to be mostly consumed as a substitute for alcoholic and traditional soft drinks (e.g. AWWA-RF 1993; FWR 1996) – the exception being when water contamination presents serious health risks and the trust in the tap water company is highly eroded (e.g. Lonnon 2004)." Another explanation for the rise in popularity of bottled water is that "the consumption of 'pure' and 'natural' bottled water in degraded environments may represent a symbolic purging behavior." Additional research has analyzed the commodification of bottled water through the corporate and cultural branding of nature, and how this commodification has added to the discourse around access to water as a human right. There is a long and storied history of the portrayal of water as a product of and necessity for nature. Richard Wilk argues that somewhere along the way from the early Christian idealization of water as a pure substance to our modern abilities to exert power over nature, people have formed opinions on the adequacy of water based on its delivery. Public access to clean water was once a dream of the industrial world, but now, according to Wilk, it is seen as dirty. Drawing on his own research and that of other scholars, he presents a complex ideological system: bottled water (which is water that has been exposed to human intervention) is understood as pure or acceptable; water directly from a natural source (which is water that has not been exposed to human intervention – a spring, river, glacier, etc.) is assumed to be dirty and not to be trusted; and water that is provided for the public (which is water from an anonymous source that is controlled by the town or state) is also seen as dirty and untrustworthy. Despite these varying views, bottled water companies have successfully infiltrated the consumer market. Marketers have recognized and fed into the fetishization or degradation of these different water sources. These marketing schemes have an emphasis on "very old forms of value" and the manipulation of "distance, either increasing or decreasing it in geography, time, or social proximity". Wilk argues that the lack of consistency in which types and brands of water are available to all American consumers restricts individuals from exercising their personal moral and ethical ideals on sourcing their water. The struggle between trust and distrust of these water sources – whether it is natural or perceived to be natural – is central in the commodification of water.

Many low-income families avoid drinking tap water because they fear it may cause sickness. Bottled, filtered, and tap water are all for the most part safe in the United States. The Environmental Protection Agency regulations for tap water are "actually stricter than the Food and Drug Administration regulations for bottled water." A study of drinking water in Cincinnati, Ohio, discovered that bacterial counts in bottled water were often higher than those in tap water and fluoride concentration was inconsistent.

Globally, there is an intensifying environmental backlash against bottled water usage. As global consumption of bottled water soars, environmental groups such as the World Wide Fund for Nature (WWF) and Greenpeace have warned of the huge environmental footprint of the plastic in which the water is packaged. In 2001, a WWF study, "Bottled water: understanding a social phenomenon", warned that in many countries, bottled water may be no safer or healthier than tap water and it sold for up to 1,000 times the price. It said the booming market would put severe pressure on recycling plastics and could lead to landfill sites drowning in mountains of plastic bottles. Also, the study found that the production of bottled water uses more water than the consumer actually buys in the bottle itself.

=== Pricing ===
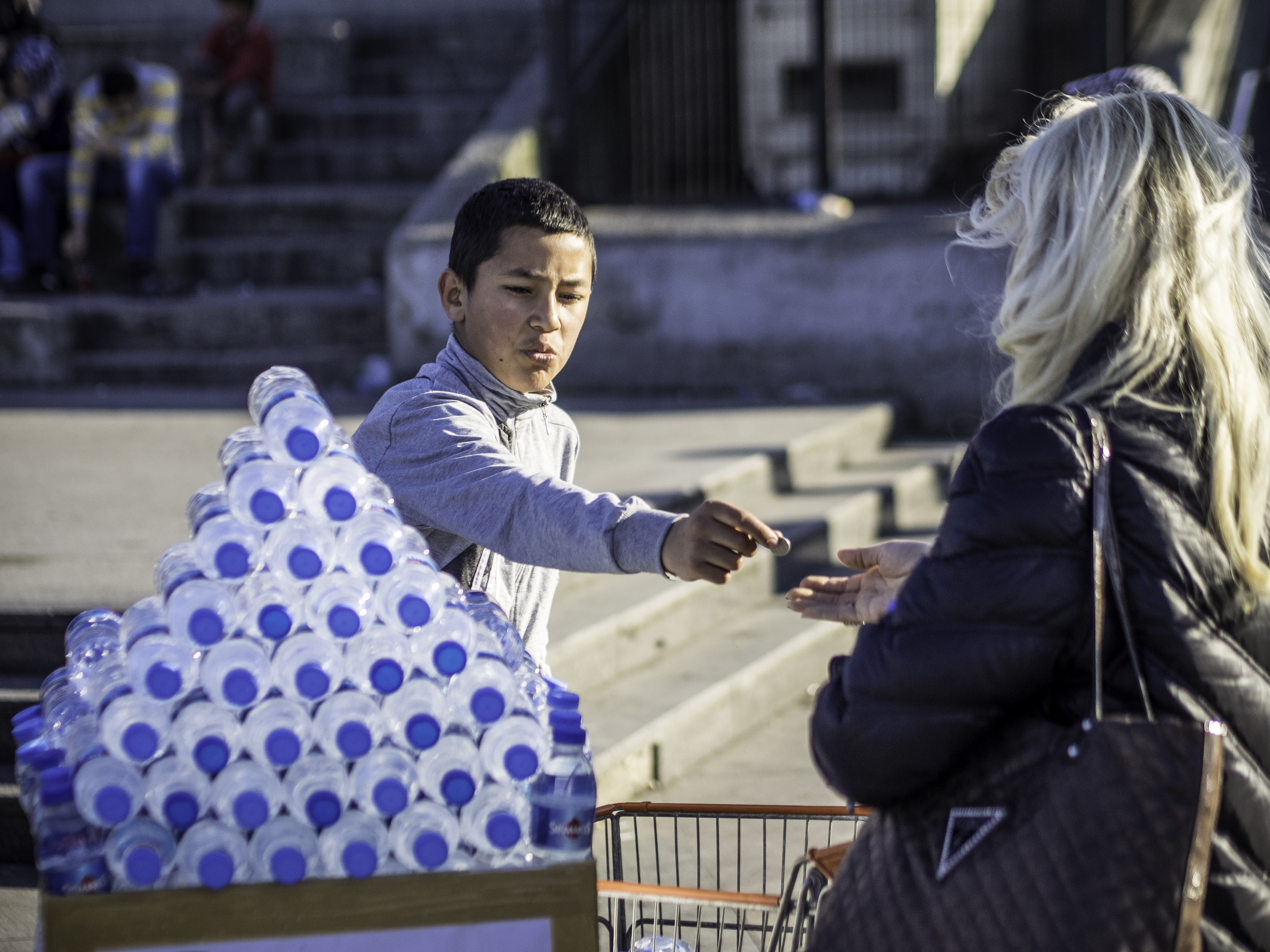
A street vendor selling bottled water in Istanbul, Turkey

Bottled water is more expensive than municipally-supplied tap water. Tap water sources and delivery systems (taps and faucets) are fixed in place while bottled water is available at many differing price points and in a variety of size formats.

"The consumption of bottled and filtered water has dramatically increased in the United States during the past decade, with bottled water sales tripling to about $4 billion a year. More than 50% of the US population drinks bottled water and 'people spend from 240 to over 10,000 times more per gallon for bottled water than they typically do for tap water.' An annual supply of bottled water for a person who consumes 8 glasses a day would cost approximately $200; the same amount of tap water would cost approximately $0.33. In general, women are more likely to drink bottled water than men, and Hispanic women are the group most likely to drink bottled water."

The Beverage Marketing Corporation (BMC) states that in 2013, the average wholesale price per gallon of domestic non-sparkling bottled water was $1.21. BMC's research also shows that consumers tend to buy bottled water in bulk from supermarkets (25.3%) or large discount retailers (57.9%) because it costs significantly less. Convenience stores are likely to have higher prices (4.5%), as do drug stores (2.8%). The remaining 9.5% is accounted for through vending machines, cafeterias and other food service outlets, and other types of sales.

=== Bans ===
In response to environmental and financial concerns, a few localities and U.S. colleges are banning bottled water sales.

In 2009, the small New South Wales town of Bundanoon voted to become the first town in the world to ban the selling or dispensing of bottled water. Bundanoon caught the attention of many other cities around the world.

After a Sydney-based beverage company wanted to open a water extraction plant in the New South Wales town Bundanoon, residents outlawed the sale of bottled water. The town continues to fight the company's proposal in court. "In the same week the New South Wales state premier also banned all state departments and agencies from buying bottled water because of its huge environmental footprint, joining more than 70 cities in the United States, Canada and the United Kingdom that have banned bottled water in their departments."

In 2012, the town of Concord, Massachusetts, became the first in the United States to ban the sale of bottled water. Specifically, sales of non-sparkling, unflavored drinking water in single-serving polyethelyne terephthalate (PET) bottles of 1 litre (34 ounces) or less are prohibited. The ban went into effect on 1 January 2013.

== Commodification ==
The commodification of water into bottled water has led to the transformation of a once freely accessible resource into a widely marketed consumer product. Bottled water, initially introduced for its perceived purity and convenience, has become a global industry with substantial economic implications. In a 2006 article, American anthropologist Richard Wilk explored the commodification of bottled water, examining the cultural meanings embedded in water that are then manipulated by marketers, as well as the motivations behind the purchasing of bottled water. The commodification process involves branding, packaging, and marketing water as a commodity, often emphasizing qualities such as freshness, purity, and health benefits.

Wilk argues that the historical significance of water, from sacred springs to the modernist industrial theme of controlling nature, contributes to its unique capacity to convey both the magic of nature and technological mastery. Marketing strategies capitalize on nature-related imagery, using labels predominantly in blue and transparent bottles to emphasize purity. Wilk further examines the symbolic analysis of water's associations with nature, purity, and danger. Bottled water also intersects with social distinctions, health claims, and the exoticizing of its origins to enhance value. Wilk also addresses that bottled water, often marketed as superior or purer than tap water, frequently originates from municipal water supplies. Despite claims of taste distinctions, blind tests often reveal indiscernible differences between tap and bottled water.

=== Health concerns ===
In the United States, bottled water and tap water are regulated by different federal agencies: the Food and Drug Administration (FDA) regulates bottled water and the Environmental Protection Agency (EPA) regulates the quality of tap water. Under the Safe Drinking Water Act the EPA has set maximum contaminant levels for approximately 90 contaminants that might be found in drinking water and 15 secondary maximum contaminant levels.

In some areas, tap water may contain added fluoride, which helps prevent tooth decay and cavities. Some bottled water manufacturers in the United States add fluoride to their product, or provide a fluoridated bottled water product. The FDA of the United States does not require bottled water manufacturers to list the fluoride content on the label. However, unlike tap water where the amount of fluoride added by municipalities to drinking water is not federally regulated, the FDA has set specific limits for how much fluoride may be found in bottled water. Water fluoridation remains controversial in countries that require it (the United States, United Kingdom, Ireland, Canada, Australia, and a handful of other countries). Several studies have examined the content of fluoride and other chemicals in bottled water as well as the accuracy of these values as printed on the labels showing some significant difference between labeled and measured value.

According to a 1999 NRDC study, in which roughly 22 percent of brands were tested, at least one sample of bottled drinking water contained chemical contaminants at levels above strict state health limits. Some of the contaminants found in the study could pose health risks if consumed over a long period of time. The NRDC report conceded that "most waters contained no detectable bacteria, however, and the level of synthetic organic chemicals and inorganic chemicals of concern for which [they] were tested were either below detection limits or well below all applicable standards." Meanwhile, a report by the Drinking Water Research Foundation found that of all samples tested by NRDC, "federal FDA or EPA limits were allegedly exceeded only four times, twice for total coliforms and twice for fluorides."

Studies show that the plastics used for bottles contain chemicals having estrogenic activity, even when they claim otherwise. Although some of the bottled water contained in glass were found polluted with chemicals as well, the researchers believe some of the contamination of water in the plastic containers may have come from the plastic containers. Leaching of chemicals into the water is related to the plastic bottles being exposed to either low or high temperatures.

A 2018 study found that the vast majority of bottled water contains microplastics. Following this, the World Health Organization has launched a review into the safety of drinking microplastics. Analysis of some of the world's most popular bottled water brands found that more than 90% contained tiny pieces of plastic. The tests were carried out at the State University of New York at Fredonia as part of a project involving original research and reporting by the US-based journalism organization Orb Media. Using a dye called Nile Red, which binds to free-floating pieces of plastic, the university's Sherri Mason found an average of 10 plastic particles per litre of water, each larger than the size of a human hair. Smaller particles assumed to be plastic but not positively identified were found as well – an average of 314 per litre.

In 2008, researchers from Arizona State University found that storing plastic bottles in temperatures at or above 60 °C can cause antimony to enter the water contained in the bottles. Therefore, frequently drinking from bottles stored in places such as cars during the summer months may have negative health effects.

=== Safety ===
There have been no major outbreaks of illness or serious safety concerns associated with bottled water in the past decade, an FDA official stated in testimony before a 9 July 2009 Congressional hearing. Conversely, as noted in the Drinking Water Research Foundation's (DWRF) 2013 report, Microbial Health Risks of Regulated Drinking Waters in the United States, EPA researchers reported an estimated 16.4 million cases of acute gastrointestinal illness per year are caused by tap water. Subsequent research has estimated that number of illnesses to be closer to 19.5 million cases per year.

=== Bottled water versus carbonated beverages ===
Bottled noncarbonated drinking water competes in the marketplace with carbonated beverages (including carbonated water) sold in individual plastic bottles. Consumption of water often is considered a healthier substitute for sodas.

According to the Container Recycling Institute, sales of flavoured, non-carbonated drinks are expected to surpass soda sales by 2010. In response, Coca-Cola and Pepsi-Cola have introduced new carbonated drinks that are fortified with vitamins and minerals, Diet Coke Plus and Tava, marketed as "sparkling beverages".

=== Bottled water versus tap water ===
Tap water is one of the most rigorously tested and monitored products in developed countries and it is very safe to drink. Bottled water may have reduced amounts of copper, lead, and other metal contaminants since it does not run through the plumbing pipes where tap water is exposed to metal corrosion; however, this varies by the household and plumbing system.

In much of the developed world, chlorine often is added as a disinfectant to tap water. If the water contains organic matter, this may produce other byproducts in the water such as trihalomethanes and haloacetic acids, which has shown to increase the risk of cancer. The level of residual chlorine found at around 0.0002 g per litre, which is too small to cause any health problems directly. The chlorine concentration recommended by World Health Organization is between 0.0002 and 0.0005 g/L.

The documentary Tapped argues against the bottled water industry, asserting that tap water is healthier, more environmentally sustainable, and more ecologically sound than bottled water. The film focuses on the bottled water industry in the United States. The film has received largely positive reviews, and has spawned college campus groups such as "Beyond the Bottle". Yet, as many people remain generally unaware of the negative health and environmental impacts associated with bottled water, recent research in environmental psychology has started to investigate how to reduce the public's consumption of bottled water.

== See also ==
- Canned water
- International Bottled Water Association
- List of bottled water brands
- Reuse of water bottles
