= Userplane =

Service for social messaging websites

- Website type: Instant messaging, Online chat
- Available in: Multilingual
- Dissolved: August 1, 2013; 13 years ago
- Website: userplane.com
- Commercial: Yes
- Registration: Optional
- Launched: 2000
- Current status: Offline

Userplane was a white label service that offered both group-chat and one-to-one messenger services, which gave website owners the ability to offer chat between their users in a wall-gardened experience.

Userplane was founded in 2001 by Mike Jones, Kevin Prentiss, Nate Thelen and Javier Hall, in Santa Monica, California.

Userplane powers chat experiences for many of the top 25 dating sites and language learning sites.

The Inuyasha Journey was the most active Userplane community, hosting tens of thousands of active users.

== Timeline ==
Userplane was founded in 2001 by Mike Jones, Nate Thelen and Javier Hall.

In 2006, Userplane was acquired by AOL for $40M.

August 2008, CEO Mike Jones leaves Userplane to join MySpace as CEO.

October 2008, JS-Kit teams up with Userplane to distribute chat widgets.

During 2011, Userplane launched its new SDK platform with Webmessenger3 and Presencebar.

On September 24, 2013, Userplane ended services.
