= Take Your Dog to Work Day =

Informal observance on June 22

Take Your Dog to Work Day (TYDTWDay) was created by Pet Sitters International and first celebrated in 1999. PSI created the day to encourage businesses to allow dogs in the workplace for one Friday each year to celebrate dogs as companions and promote their adoptions from local shelters, rescue groups, and humane societies. PSI believes that through the event, dogless co-workers will be encouraged to adopt. The week leading up to Take Your Dog To Work Day is Take Your Pet To Work Week. Take Your Dog to Work Day and Take Your Pet to Work Week are registered trademarks of Pet Sitters International, Inc.

There is increasing participation in TYDTWD in Canada, Australia, United Kingdom, New Zealand, and Israel.

== History ==
- In 1999, PSI held the first Take Your Dog to Work Day in the United States on July 14. An estimated 300 companies participated nationwide.
- In 2000, the now defunct Pets.com purchased the rights to the day. That same year, Pets.com closed as a result of the dot-com crash, and PSI regained the trademark.
- In 2001, Pet Sitters International hosted the 3rd Annual Take Your Dog To Work Day event. Ernie, the adopted pet of PSI President Patti Moran, became the first TYDTWDay Poster Dog.
- In 2002, a dog named Sandy became the official Poster Dog for PSI's 4th Annual Take Your Dog To Work Day.
- In 2003, Take Your Dog To Work Day celebrated five years of helping to save the lives of homeless pets. More than 5,000 companies joined in the celebration.
- In 2005, more than 37,000 dog lovers visited the TYDTWDay website to download information and learn more about the event.
- In 2006, website visits in the month of June increased to more than 52,000 as more businesses began opening their doors to employees’ dogs for the day. Hoover Charleston "Roo" McGinnis was the 2006 Poster Dog.
- In 2015, PSI celebrated the 17th annual TYDTWDay and revived its 2001 theme, "Because who's ever heard of working like a cat?!," to promote the joys of dogs in the workplace.
- In 2016, PSI and event sponsor Modern Dog magazine encouraged pet lovers to "make it your business to help pets in need" by participating in the 18th annual TYDTWDay.

2018 marks the 20th annual celebration of Take Your Dog To Work Day and the event is scheduled for Friday, June 22.

== In the news ==
Take Your Dog To Work Day has been covered by media outlets in various countries. Many celebrities, companies and government officials have also posted about the day on social media, including Liam Hemsworth, Barack Obama, Ben & Jerry's and the MLB.
