= Richard R. Wilk =

American anthropologist

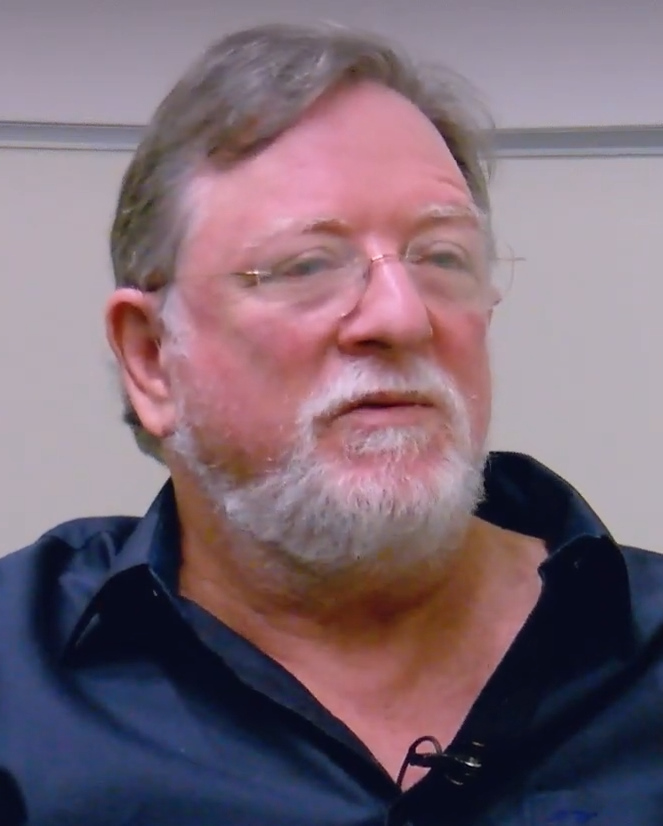
- Richard Wilk in 2020
- Born: May 22, 1953 (age 73); Connecticut, U.S.
- Education: New York University; University of Arizona
- Scientific career
- Fields: Anthropology
- Workplaces: Indiana University
- Doctoral advisor: Robert McC. Netting

Richard R. Wilk (born 22 May 1953) is an American anthropologist best known for his work in economic anthropology focusing most recently on food, though he has published widely on diverse topics including human ecology, consumer behavior, beauty pageants, Maya culture, bad poetry, and visual anthropology. Wilk has published 89 works, and his research has been translated into five languages. He was the Director of the Open Anthropology Institute.

== Education ==
Wilk received his Bachelor of Arts at New York University in 1971 and his Masters and PhD at the University of Arizona in 1981. Wilk did his dissertation research in southern Belize describing the ecological strategies of Kekchi speakers in and around the village of Aguacate. His dissertation was later published in the book Household Ecology: Economic Change and Domestic Life among the Kekchi Maya in Belize.

== Career ==
Wilk moved to Indiana University in 1988 where he spent the remainder of his academic career, chairing the department in 2003, and named Provost's Professor in 2011 and Distinguished Professor in 2017. He has held visiting professorships at University College London, University of California at Berkeley, National University of Singapore, Ecole des Hautes Etudes en Sciences Sociales in Marseille, and the University of Gastronomic Sciences in Bra, Italy.

== Awards ==
- Society for Economic Anthropology Book Prize, for “Home Cooking in the Global Village,” 2009

== Felony Conviction ==
In 2024, Wilk pleaded guilty to possession of child pornography, a level 5 felony.
