= Dollar Shave Club =

American grooming products by mail company

Dollar Shave Club, Inc.
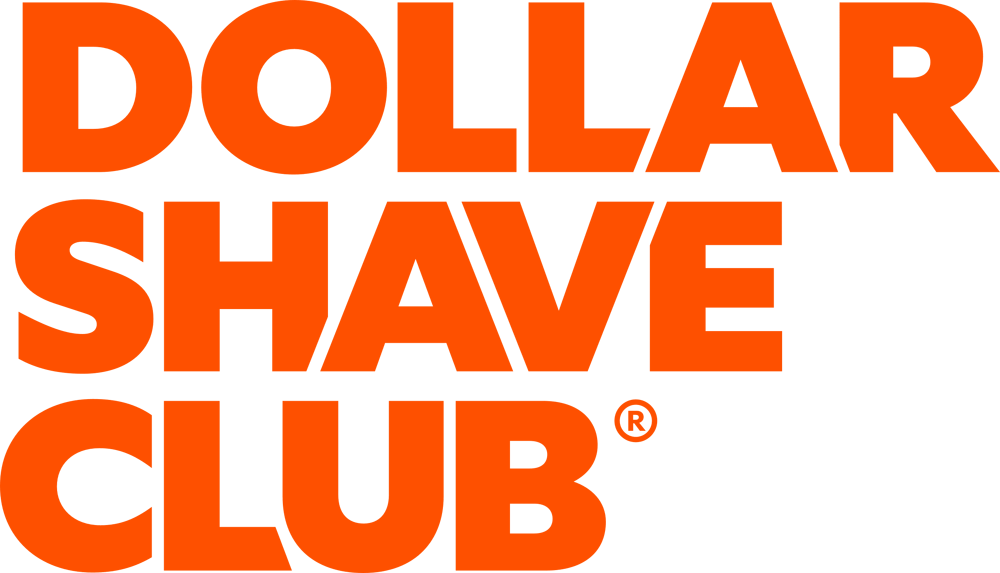
- Type: Subsidiary
- Industry: Consumer packaged goods
- Founded: January 18, 2011; 15 years ago in Venice, California
- Founders: Michael Dubin; Mark Levine
- Headquarters: Durham, North Carolina, U.S.
- Area served: United States; Canada; Australia; United Kingdom
- Parent: Nexus Capital Management, LP (65%, 2023-present); Unilever (100%: 2016-23; 35%: 2023-present)
- Website: dollarshaveclub.com

Dollar Shave Club, Inc. is an American company based in Venice, California, that delivers razors and other personal grooming products to customers by mail. It delivers razor blades on a monthly basis and offers additional grooming products for home delivery.

== History ==
Dollar Shave Club was founded by Mark Levine and Michael Dubin. The pair met at a party and spoke of their frustrations with the cost of razor blades. With their own money and investments from start-up incubator Science Inc., they began operations in January 2011 and launched their website in April 2011.

Dollar Shave Club (DSC) was backed by a variety of venture capitalists. In March 2012, seed investors provided $1 million in funding from groups that included Kleiner Perkins Caufield & Byers, Andreessen Horowitz, Shasta Ventures, and others. The same group, joined by Venrock, provided $9.8 million in series A funding in October 2012.

A year later, a $12 million series B round was raised led by Venrock, Comcast Ventures, New World Investors and Battery Ventures. Amidst the fundraising announcement, DSC announced it would be expanding its product line to include a dozen other men's products in 2014.

On July 19, 2016, one year after securing $75 million in series D funding, DSC was acquired by Unilever for a reported $1 billion in cash. On October 26, 2023, Unilever announced that it had sold a majority stake in the company to Nexus Capital Management, LP, while still retaining 35% of Dollar Shave Club.

In February 2025, Dollar Shave Club announced that it would relocate its headquarters from Los Angeles to Durham, North Carolina. The company opened its new headquarters at the American Tobacco Campus in downtown Durham in September 2025.

== Membership ==
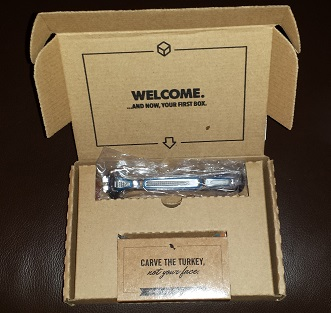
The initial welcome packet from Dollar Shave Club

Dollar Shave Club offers three membership plans, which can be upgraded or downgraded at any time. The membership service first launched March 6, 2012, via a YouTube video that went viral. The YouTube video attracted an unanticipated amount of traffic, which crashed the company's server in the first hour. Once Dubin got the server working, he enlisted a team of friends and contractors to help fulfill the 12,000 orders that arrived in the first 48 hours of launching the video. The orders were initially packed by hand in a warehouse in Gardena, California, before the company moved their warehouse and fulfillment to a third-party logistics center in Kentucky.

As of 2016, the company has acquired 3.2 million subscribers. Although the company primarily markets its products to men, approximately 20% of its customers are women.

== Products ==
Dollar Shave Club offers three plans: "The Humble Twin" (two blades per razor, five razors per month, $4 per month), "The 4X" (four blades, four razors, $7) and "The Executive" (six blades, four razors, $10). Each subscription comes with a compatible handle.

Most of the razor handles and blades are not made by Dollar Shave Club, but rather are re-sold Dorco products.

The company also sells related accessories, such as shave butter, wet wipes, and moisturizer.

In late 2012, the company launched its program in Canada and Australia.

In 2015, the company expanded its product line to include hair care products, called "Boogie's". The line includes hair gel, hair cream, hair paste, hair clay and hair fiber.

In May 2015, the company began hiring writers and editors for a new website, Mel Magazine (stylized as MEL) which went online in late 2015. The website contains editorial content described by the company as "men's lifestyle topics". While the site does not host sponsored content, its business model "relies upon being a branded publisher", according to Fast Company.

In December 2015, Gillette brand owner Procter & Gamble filed a patent infringement lawsuit that claimed Dollar Shave Club used its patented formulas to manufacture copycat blades. The lawsuit was settled in 2019 on undisclosed terms.

In February 2018, the company launched in the United Kingdom.

== Promotion ==
On March 6, 2012, the company uploaded a YouTube video entitled "Our Blades Are F***ing Great" featuring CEO Michael Dubin, delivering his speech in a nonchalant and sarcastic manner. The video prompted 12,000 orders in a two-day span after it was released, and has received over 27 million views as of November 2020.

The video won "Best Out-of-Nowhere Video Campaign" at the 2012 Ad Age Viral Video Awards. Dollar Shave Club was awarded a 2013 Webby Award in the Fashion & Beauty category and earned the People's Choice Webby Award in the Consumer Packaged Goods category.

On June 4, 2013, Dollar Shave Club released a second video on YouTube called "Let's Talk About #2", which again starred its CEO and promoted One Wipe Charlies. The video won the Shorty Award in 2014 for best use of Social Media.

In 2014, Dollar Shave Club and its One Wipe Charlies teamed up with the Colon Cancer Alliance in an effort to help "wipe out" colon cancer. The company reports that during National Colorectal Cancer Awareness month it reached 23 million people in spreading the message about the importance of getting screened. The company also donated $10,000 to the Colon Cancer Alliance, contributing a percentage of One Wipe Charlies' sales and putting a dollar value on social shares. As part of the campaign, Michael Dubin had his own colonoscopy streamed live online.

== See also ==
- Harry's
- Subscription box
