= Cat in a Flat =

Online cat sitting brand

Cat in a Flat is an online cat-sitting brand that connects cat owners with local cat sitters.

== History ==
Cat in a Flat was founded in 2014 by Julie Barnes and Kathrin Burckhardt after discovering the need of finding a cat sitter. In 2015-16, the company received investment through Crowdcube and expanded its operation in the UK, Germany, Ireland, France, Belgium, Netherland, Austria, and Switzerland. In 2016, Cat in a Flat won a BIMA Award, a prize for digital marketing.

In October 2024 Cat in a Flat was acquired by the American pet sitting platform Rover.com, and expanded its operation to the United States as well.
