= TapClicks =

American marketing technology company

- Type: Private
- Industry: Marketing
- Founded: 2009; 17 years ago
- Headquarters: San Jose, California, United States
- Key people: Babak Hedayati (CEO, Founder); Colby West (President, Co-Founder)
- Services: Marketing Operations
- Website: tapclicks.com

TapClicks is an American privately held marketing technology company, with headquarters located in San Jose, California. TapClicks’ TapAnalytics marketing operations platform is focused on marketing workflow, performance analytics, client reporting and data.

TapClicks’ platform is in use by organizations including media companies, digital agencies and enterprises.

== History ==
TapClicks was founded in 2009 and maintains headquarters in San Jose, California, with development and sales offices in Boston and Montreal. Partners of TapClicks include MicroStrategy and Tableau Software.

In April 2017, TapClicks acquired SEO and marketing reporting company, Raven Tools.

In 2018, TapClicks received funding from venture capital/private equity firms Boathouse Capital and SaaS Capital.

In April 2020, TapClicks acquired cross-network advertising startup, AdStage.

== See also ==
- Digital Media
- Web Development
