= Canned water =

Drinking water stored in a can

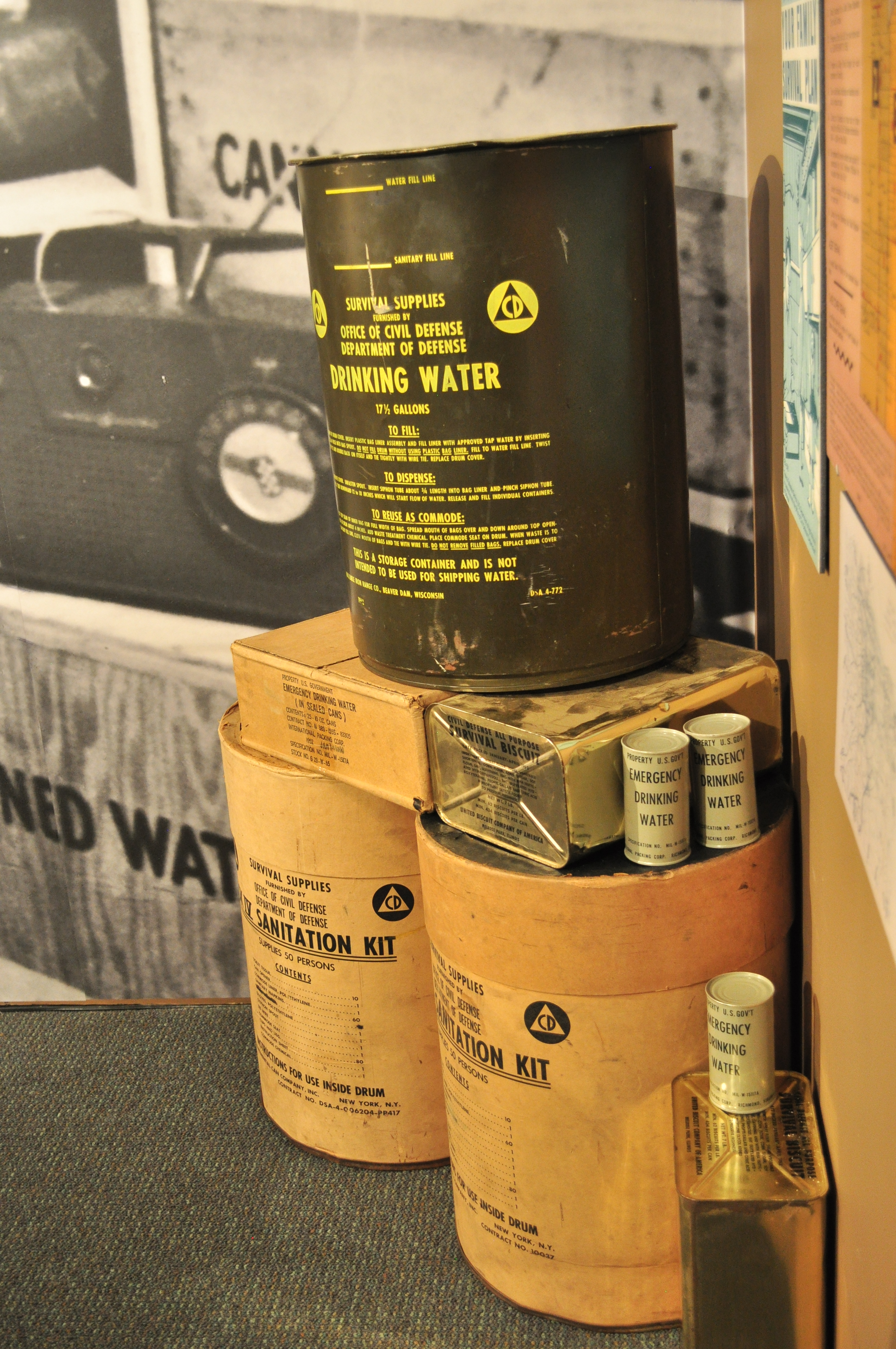
Large can of still water with other survival supplies

Canned water is drinking water, including spring water, artesian spring water, purified water, carbonated water and mineral water, packaged in beverage cans made of aluminium or tin-plated steel.

Individual serving aluminium cans and bottles are less common alternatives to bottled water. Canned water is often used where storage or distribution systems are set up for cans. Some companies have launched water in cans, offering a more environmentally sustainable alternative to plastic bottles.

Cans of various sizes are also used for storage of potable water for emergency preparedness. Water is an important part of individual or government stockpiles. Water was stored in steel cans, lined with plastic bags, under the United States Civil Defense program. Approximately twelve million 17.5-US-gallon (66 L) cans were deployed, and could hold water for more than ten years.

Later, some manufacturers started to use a nitrogen flush to remove air and bacteria from their cans to prolong shelf life to 30 years or longer, making the water suitable for long-term storage.

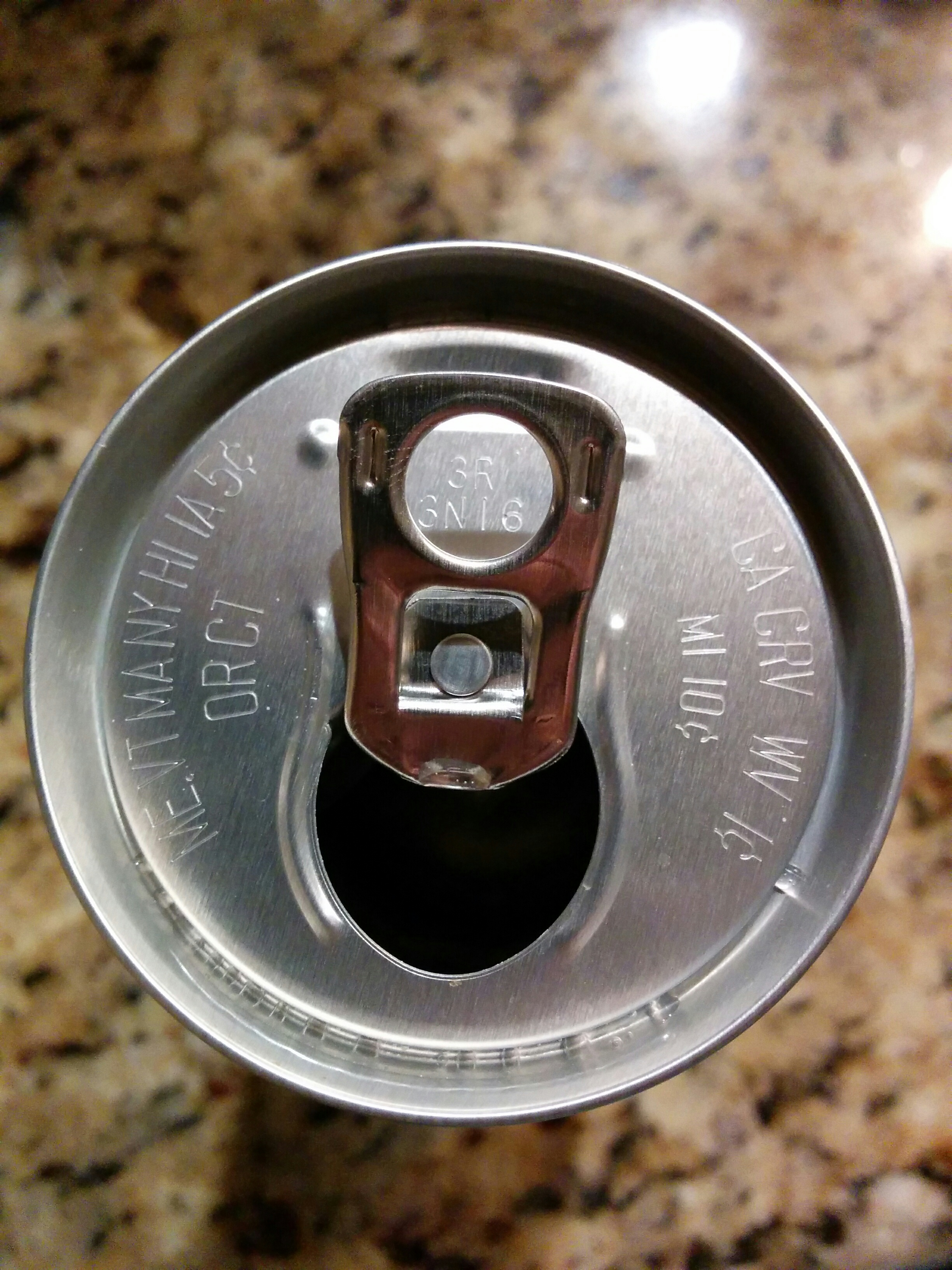
Top of a can of carbonated mineral water
