= YouTube BrandConnect =

Interactive entertainment company

- Current logo as a subsidiary of YouTube
- Company type: Private
- Founded: 2013
- Headquarters: Santa Monica, California, United States
- Area served: Worldwide
- Founders: Agnes Kozera, and David Kierzkowski
- Industry: Influencer marketing
- Employees: 11-50
- Website: www.famebit.com

YouTube BrandConnect (formerly FameBit) is an interactive entertainment company founded in 2013 and headquartered in Santa Monica, California.

The company develops and maintains an Influencer Marketing link sharing platform. As of 2016, the company has been a subsidiary of Google, grouped under their YouTube division.

== History ==
=== As independent company ===
FameBit was formed in 2013 by high school friends Agnes Kozera, and David Kierzkowski. Kierzkowski had previously co-founded the digital marketing platform TapClicks. He was approached by Kozera who was the founder of SeasonsBox, a subscription based gift delivery service, which had used social media influencers for advertising. The two developed FameBit as a link sharing platform which allowed companies to post offers to influencers.

In February 2014 FameBit was one of two Canadian based companies accepted into 500 Startups venture fund.

By 2015 FameBit had signed up about 9,000 YouTubers, and had run about 1,600 campaigns for about 1200 brands. At the time the average subscriber count for a FameBit Influencer was 46,000.

By the end of the 2015 that number had risen to 21,000 across 6 social media platforms (Vine, Twitter, Facebook, Tumblr, Instagram, & YouTube)

By 2016, FameBit had been used in the creation of about 25,000 branded videos, with an estimated 2 billion minutes of viewing time.

The new features also cover a creator partnerships hub for advertisers in 2025, along with new capabilities to find creators and track the results of sponsored videos. YouTube also unveiled Open Call, a new feature that lets advertisers who want to participate publish their campaign briefs and see submissions from creators in the YouTube Partner Program, in June 2025.

=== Acquisition by Google ===
On October 11, 2016, Google acquired Famebit, for what was later disclosed to be US$36 million. At the time of purchase, FameBit claimed 50,000 registered users. Google planned to merge the platform within their YouTube division.

Since being acquired by Google, FameBit has allowed marketers to retarget videos made on FameBit to viewers via Google's Ads.

In 2020, FameBit shut down its self-service program which allowed creators to independently find brands to work with.

On June 16, 2020, the company rebranded as YouTube BrandConnect.

In June 2020, YouTube revealed that the brand of its branded-content marketplace, FameBit, would be renamed YouTube BrandConnect. The platform aims to facilitate a connection between eligible creators and advertisers and enable ad creators to manage campaigns for their brands, and to give advertisers an avenue to measure campaign performance..

YouTube Creator Partnerships is a new platform that was launched in 2026 by YouTube, which combines YouTube BrandConnect and the YouTube Creator Partnerships Hub. They merged creation-discovery and brand-collaboration features with advertiser features in YouTube Studio and Google's advertising platforms.

As announced in March 2026, YouTube will combine its BrandConnect and Creator Partnerships Hub into a single entity, called YouTube Creator Partnerships. The single platform brings together creator tools to YouTube Studio and advertiser tools to Google Ads and Display & Video 360. Current BrandConnect offerings will remain the same under the new name, YouTube.YouTube said that the current BrandConnect offerings would remain unchanged under the new name, YouTube.

== Business model ==
FameBit acts as a platform for companies to post requests for social media content creators to advertise products and services, for a negotiable fee. FameBit receives 10% of this fee.

== Controversy ==
FameBit has been criticized by brands for allowing YouTubers to join without verifying their followers. FameBit has also been criticized by Content Creators for banning them from the platform due to brand disputes.

Several employees have claimed that FameBit promotes a toxic work environment, with 3 out of 4 of their Glassdoor reviews awarding the company 1 star.
