= Pet sitting =

Temporary care taking of another person's pet(s)

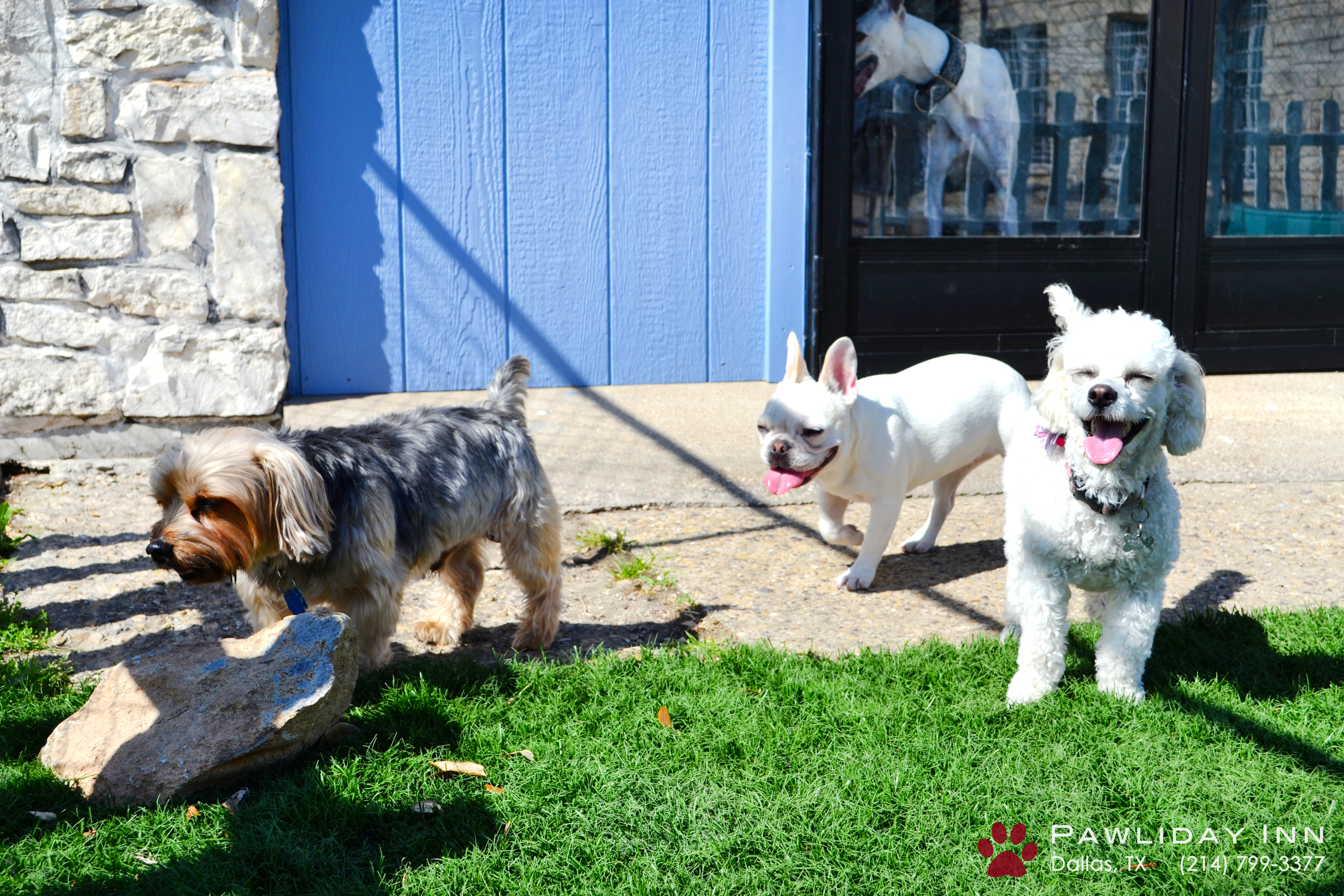

Pet sitting is the act of temporarily taking care of another person's pet for a given time frame. It commonly occurs at the pet owner's home, but may also occur at the provider's home or at a pet sitting place of business or organization. Pet sitting is a more personal and individualized arrangement for care compared to boarding or kenneling. Specialized training is usually not required for pet sitting.

== Description ==
In 1997 Pet Sitters International (PSI) successfully campaigned to have "pet sitting" added to the Random House Dictionary. "Pet sitting" is defined as "the act of caring for a pet in its own home while the owner is away." Dog walking is also a form of pet sitting since it involves coming to the pet’s home to provide exercise and companionship. Caring for pets in the clients’ homes is what separates pet sitters from boarders or doggie daycares. Pet sitters visit the pet home to provide a range of services. This primarily involves feeding, exercise and companionship. Pet sitters generally bill clients on a per-visit, per-day or per vacation basis, and include additional charges for multiple pets, travel expenses, and non-standard duties.

Pet sitting services do not include services in the pet sitter's home. This is considered "pet boarding." Boarding outside the pet's home generally requires a kennel license, city or county approval, and in some counties oversight by the local Department of Agriculture which requires protocols to help maintain standards to prevent the transmission of diseases.

In many areas, no occupational license is required for pet sitters. The term "licensed" is often used by pet sitting professionals to refer to licenses to do business, and/or animal transportation permits available within the coverage area of the business. While licenses are not needed in all areas, they may be required in specific locations.

== Global market ==
According to Pet Sitters International's 2016 State of the Industry Survey, its members completed 17 million pet sitting assignments and generated more than $391 million in pet sitting revenues in 2015.

Many pet owners prefer hiring pet sitters instead of the more traditional pet care options available. Some reasons cited for using a pet sitter are to prevent stress to the animal caused by a changing environment, travel trauma, contracting illnesses and parasites from exposure to other animals, not meeting vaccination requirements that may be necessary for kennelling, and to maintain regular routines and prevent the need to adapt to a new environment. It is also a solution for pets with health problems and mobility issues due to arthritis, dysplasia, incontinence, etc.

Many new pet sitting businesses are emerging due to high levels of pet ownership and relatively low financial barriers of entry. The pet sitting gig economy has led to the creation of various apps and websites to match pet sitters with clients.

=== Vacation care ===
Vacation care is the most typical type of pet sitting service. While a pet owner is on vacation, a pet sitter will arrange to visit the client's home for a period of time and frequency as determined between the pet owner and sitter. Services include (but are not limited to) feeding, exercising, grooming, providing company, monitoring health, administering medications or other special care. Less commonly, pet sitters offer live-in care which can also include the service of house sitting and property maintenance.

=== Dog walking ===
Pet sitters commonly provide dog walking services. Clients hire pet sitters to exercise and care for their pets when they are unable to do so themselves. This is particularly prevalent in dense urban areas, where pet owners often lead busy working lives, and are hence unable to care for their pets. Dog walking services may also be sued by owners who are unable to exercise their pets because of health conditions or age-related physical limitations.

Pet sitters may also offer other more aggressive methods of exercise for dogs during dog walking appointments. These methods include jogging, running, inline skating, bicycling, or dog scootering with client dogs.

Commercial dog walkers in some regions are required to obtain a license for dog walking along with inspection of the vehicle that is used to transport dogs for commercial walking. Such licenses sometimes limit the number of dogs that can be walked at one time.

== Insurance and bonding ==
=== Insurance ===
Most professional pet sitters are insured through pet sitter insurance providers. Most pet sitting insurance providers are country-specific. The United Kingdom, the United States, Australia, and Canada each have firms insuring pet sitters.

As of 2016, the major American and Canadian pet sitting liability insurance providers include limits from $2,000,000 to $4,000,000 for liability claims. They also include an uncommon endorsement that provides coverage for care, custody, and control of the client pets from $10,000 to $200,000 per occurrence. Coverage is included for fire damage, lost keys, and other negligence claims. The major UK pet sitting insurance providers claim coverage limits between £2,000,000 and £10,000,000. The limits for liability claims generally range from £2,000,000 to £5,000,000.

According to the PSI 2022 State of the Industry Survey, 78% of the association's U.S. member pet caretakers obtain their insurance through Business Insurers of the Carolinas (BIC).

Pet Sitters Associates (8%), PETCARE Insurance (6%) and Mourer-Foster (3%), among others, were also used by the U.S.-based pet-sitting and dog-walking companies owned by PSI's members as insurance providers.

In the same poll, 28% of respondents said they used PROFUR, 1% said they used Canadian Pet Pro, and 59% of Canadian pet sitters said they used BINKS (PSI's Preferred Canadian Provider) for insurance.

Most pet sitter insurance plans provide coverage for pet transport. The majority of pet sitting industry insurers also provide care, custody, and control liability coverage for all animals, excluding the loss from income from an animal that may be used for other business ventures such as farming.

Some resources recommend that pet sitters be bonded, though many professional organizations in recent years have held bonding to be unnecessary.

Pet sitters are generally not protected from injury to themselves by regular pet sitting liability coverage. pet sitter liability insurance usually covers injury to other people and pets.

=== Bonding ===
A dishonesty or fidelity bond claim generally applies when a pet sitter is convicted in criminal court of theft from a client home. When the pet sitter is convicted, the bond will reimburse the client for the loss, and then seek reimbursement from the pet sitter. This process can take many years to complete, and usually relies on a criminal law court conviction.

Many pet sitters have decided to seek actual insurance coverage for theft instead of procuring a bond. Theft insurance coverage does not require convictions, and can include coverage for accidental breakage, mysterious disappearance, and accidental damage to items in a client's home.

== Certification and accreditation ==
Pet sitting organizations offer training, testing, or review of credentials for pet sitters in the form of certification or accreditation. The curriculum of pet sitting programs may include pet care, health and first aid, animal law information, nutrition, and behavior, and/or business development and management.

Certification that is credentials-based may require the pet sitter to provide a criminal background check, proof of insurance, proof of bonding, certificate of completion of a pet first aid program, documentation of business methods and policies, or other evidence of their professionalism and adherence to industry standards.

It is common for pet sitters to obtain a separate certification for pet first aid. Hands-on training can be obtained through private businesses and organizations like Red Cross. Virtual classes are also available.

== See also ==
- Dog daycare
- Pet taxi
- Cat in a Flat
