= House sitting =

Form of temporary home care and maintenance

House sitting is the practice whereby a person leaving their house for a period of time entrusts it to one or more "house sitters", who by a mutual agreement are permitted to live or stay in the property temporarily, in exchange for assuming any combination of responsibilities. These can include taking care of the home owner's pets, performing general maintenance (including pools, lawns, air-conditioning systems, etc.), keeping trespassers off the property, readdressing the mail, and in general, making sure that everything runs smoothly, just as if the owner was at home.

== Benefits for the home/pet owner ==
Pets are the reason for 80 percent of house-sitting arrangements, and for many people the cost of pet care during holidays is more than the cost of the vacation itself. Many pet owners prefer to leave their pets at home in familiar surroundings, cared for by other pet lovers.

A secondary benefit to the home owner is that the property is maintained for the entire period they are away.

It also is generally implied that crime is deterred by the presence of a house sitter. This is supported by the fact that insurance companies in some countries provide reduced rates for householders who use the services of house sitters. In the UK, most insurance companies will reject claims if the house is left vacant for more than 30 days without prior arrangement, and require that an empty property be checked at least every seven days. House sitting is therefore considered a practical solution to managing properties which would otherwise stand vacant for long periods of time.

In Canada, some insurance claims will not be paid out if they occur in a home left empty for more than four days. Therefore, it is important for home owners to have someone enter their home at least once every four days they are absent. Hiring a house sitter can provide the support and documentation needed in the event that a claim must be made with an insurance company.

== Benefits for the house sitter ==
Saving money on accommodation, while traveling on vacation, or when living nomadically, is usually considered to be the main benefit for the sitter.

House sitters can experience living like locals in different countries and cultures around the world, for anything from a few days to several months, or sometimes even longer.

== Growth of house sitting ==
House sitting has evolved from its original purpose of local sitters helping regional pet owners, to a much wider network of international house sitters who travel the world looking after other people's homes and pets. This is a year-round option for people who prefer to take vacations where they can live locally with the company of pets, or who want to live a full-time alternative lifestyle. There are an increasing number of full-time house sitters who have sold or never owned properties and choose to live life as location-independent travelers.

The industry is supported by a number of professional international and regional house-sitting websites that match house sitters with homeowners around the world following the principles of the sharing economy, whereby pet- and home-care services are provided in exchange for free accommodation.

== Practicalities ==
Members of house sitting websites often pay an annual subscription fee to be part of a network, where they can advertise house sits, or apply for house sitting assignments. Members can use the service as many times as they like for the duration of their membership.

Competition can be steep, as more people are learning about the money-saving benefits of house sitting. Having an understanding of how house-sitting platforms work and what home owners expect from a house sitter (such as background checks, written agreements, and references) enables sitters, especially new house sitters, to secure house sits in the locations they desire.

Some house sitting gigs are pay based, but other platforms use a sharing economy model where the home owner and the house sitter pay the platform a monthly or yearly fee.

Both the free and the paid models of house and pet sitting platforms act as matchmakers connecting the two parties.

== Alternative forms of house and pet sitting ==
House sitters regularly assume the role of pet care and are therefore often referred to as pet sitters or pet companions. However, pet sitting can also refer to the practice of running a pet care business, which may involve home visits, dog walking, grooming, and other pet care duties.

A newly developed version of house sitting is the contracting of house sitters who do not live on premises. This house-sitting arrangement requires the house sitter to provide regular visits to the home owner's house. The frequency of visits is determined in advance and is not less than the minimum requirements as stipulated by the home owner's insurance policy. This type of service can perform similar functions as mentioned above.
