= Dog daycare =

Short-term boarding kennel service for dogs

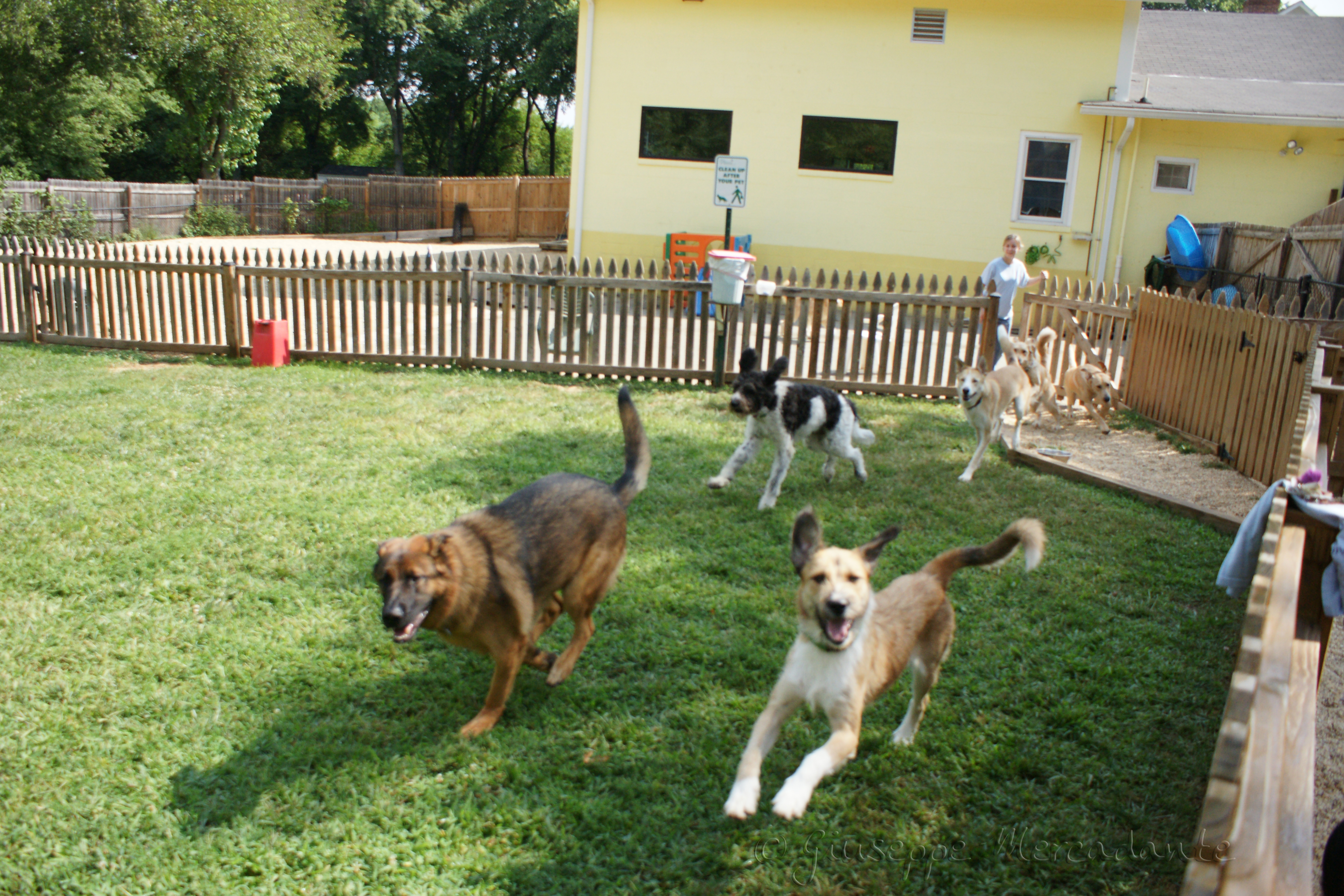
Dogs running in the yard at a dog daycare.

Dog daycare, or doggy daycare, is short-term daytime care for dogs. It differs from multi-day kennel boarding and pet sitting, where the sitter comes to the pet's home.

== Background ==
Dog daycares arose out of traditional kennels in the early 1990s. Prior to World War II, dogs more commonly lived outside in the United States, but as urbanization spread dogs started to live indoors more frequently. Other factors, including an increase in the population of adults without children, have gradually led to more attention and money being spent on pets. The first modern dog day care in New York City, Yuppie Puppy Pet Care was reportedly opened in 1987, by Joseph S. Sporn. San Francisco, another wealthy American city, has also been credited for spurring the dog day care trend.

== Environments ==
There are multiple environments and varieties of dog daycare service. For example, some facilities provide a cage-free environment where dogs play under the supervision of a trained staff member. Other facilities may provide a cage free environment for dogs to play for a portion of the day, placing dogs in cages at other times of the day. A daycare kennel is a type of facility that offers cages or runs where the dog will be placed alone during the day.

Some facilities allow dogs to play in an outside environment. Others have indoor-only facilities, where dogs interact and play in an indoor area and relieve themselves in designated inside areas.
