= Dog boarding =

Overnight care for dogs

Dog boarding is overnight care for dogs in a setting outside the owner's home. It is offered through service providers including dog kennels, professional boarding facilities, dog hotels, dog resorts, or private dog sitters' homes. Dog care in the owner's home is referred to as sitting.

== Background ==
The practice of dog boarding emerged as a solution to accommodate dogs when their owners were away, whether for vacation, business trips, or other reasons. Dog boarding facilities can vary widely, ranging from traditional kennels to more contemporary free-roaming dog hotels. In addition, some individuals opt for in-home dog boarding services or seek local dog sitters in their communities.

The concept of dog boarding evolved in the early 1990s, evolving from traditional kennels. Before World War II, dogs in the United States predominantly lived outdoors, but urbanization led to increased indoor living for dogs. In the 2010s, demographic changes, such as a growing population of childless adults, contributed to heightened attention and expenditure on pets.

Since its inception, the dog boarding industry has experienced continuous growth. In 2022, the global pet boarding services market was valued at US$6.72 billion, and it is projected to maintain a robust compound annual growth rate of 8.30% from 2023 to 2030. This expansion is primarily driven by factors like the increasing popularity of pet boarding and dog daycare services, the rise in pet ownership, the trend of humanizing pets, and the growing expenditure on pet care in both developed and developing nations.

== Types ==
=== Kennels ===
The United States boasts a considerable number of over 8,500 dog-friendly boarding kennels. These facilities provide a safe and secure environment for dogs to reside while their owners are away. Unlike breeding kennels, which focus on producing puppies, boarding kennels may offer additional services such as doggy day care, dog walking, dog training, and grooming.

Kennels serve as temporary housing for dogs in exchange for a fee, providing an alternative to hiring a dog sitter. Many kennels offer one-on-one playtime opportunities to allow dogs to socialize outside their kennel environment. Furthermore, some kennels permit the inclusion of familiar items, such as blankets and toys from the dog's home.

A kennel that offers luxurious option for dog boarding services, potentially including TVs, spa treatments, swimming pools, personalized attention and exercise plans, and group play times, may be colloquially described as a dog hotel.

=== Veterinary clinics ===
Veterinary clinics, or vet hospitals, may also offer boarding to their clients. Clinics may be set up for short-term boarding since they have to monitor pets after treatment or surgery. The environment can range from crates in a separate room or full service dog runs and play areas. The latter is more common for clinics outside metropolitan areas due to space.

However this practice, or offering, is less and less common due to resource constraints and management difficulties.
