= Pet shipping =

Transportation of animals

Pet shipping is an industry that involves transporting animals, specifically pets, often by plane. This service is commonly used when the animal's owner is moving house. However, it can also be used when transporting animals for other reasons, such as performing in dog shows. The worldwide industry body for pet shipping is the International Pet and Animal Transportation Association. Pet microchips, vaccinations, rabies titre tests, import permits, and health certificates may be required to ship an animal. Certain breeds are banned from the process due to the increase in associated risk.

== Statistics ==
2 million domestic animals board commercial flights each year. Domesticated pets have been selectively bred and genetically adapted to live alongside humans, which include dogs, cats, birds, rabbits, guinea pigs, mice, and hamsters. Dogs and cats are the most popular types of pets that are shipped. From the total amount of pets shipped via aeroplane each year, 58% are dogs and 22% are cats.

Pet shipping has increased in the 21st century. Contributing factors to this rise include the global increase of pet ownership and the high-cost associated with pet care. Australia has the highest rate of pet ownership in the world where approximately 61% of households own a pet, with 40% being dogs and 27% being cats.

Pet shipping is found both beneficial for owners and businesses, as some people will not travel without their pets and airlines therefore receive more demand to fly with them. 37% of owners have opted against travelling to stay at home with their dog, as 9 out of 10 households consider their dog part of the family.

The Department of Transport's annual report states over half a million pets flew in 2016 and of these, 26 died and 22 were injured. A third of these deaths occurred on United airlines. The common causes of animal death during pet shipping are excessively hot or cold temperatures, poor ventilation and rough handling, according to the Humane Society.

== Laws ==
The International Air Transport Association is the trade association for the world's airlines, covering 93% of scheduled international flights. It sets the minimum standards for the transportation of live animals worldwide under the ‘Live Animal Regulation’. This provides practices for humane treatment of animals, up-to-date government laws, and documentation requirements for pet shipping.

== Requirements ==
=== Pet microchip ===
A pet microchip is a permanent method of electronic identification implanted under the skin into domestic animals. A compatible microchip with the import country is required when shipping a pet, accompanied by any documentation.

=== Vaccinations ===
Vaccination schedules differ across countries. The US, Australia, UK, and Asia require fully vaccinated pets. Cats receive a vaccination that protects them against feline enteritis, rhinotracheitis, and Calicivirus. Dogs receive vaccinations that protect them against distemper, hepatitis, Parvovirus, parainfluenza, and Bordetella bronchiseptica. Vaccinations must be valid for the entire quarantine period.

=== Rabies titre test ===
The ‘Rabies Antibody Titre Test’ is a blood test taken after the rabies vaccine to ensure the pet has adequate levels of the rabies antibody in their blood. This test safeguards local animals when pets have been imported from countries where rabies is prevalent.

=== Import permit ===
Import permits include a shipping fee and suitability guidelines for shipment, filed by the pet owner with the government of the importing country.

=== Pet passport scheme ===
A pet passport is a document that accompanies the pet during its travel. The passport allows the pet to travel between countries of the EU and others that accept the passport, without needing a quarantine period post shipment. The pet passport contains information regarding the animal's microchip, rabies vaccination, rabies titre test results, parasite treatments, a picture of the pet and the animal's veterinary and ownership details. Countries outside of the EU refer to a ‘pet passport’ as all of the valid information required for a pet to travel between countries.

=== Health certificate ===
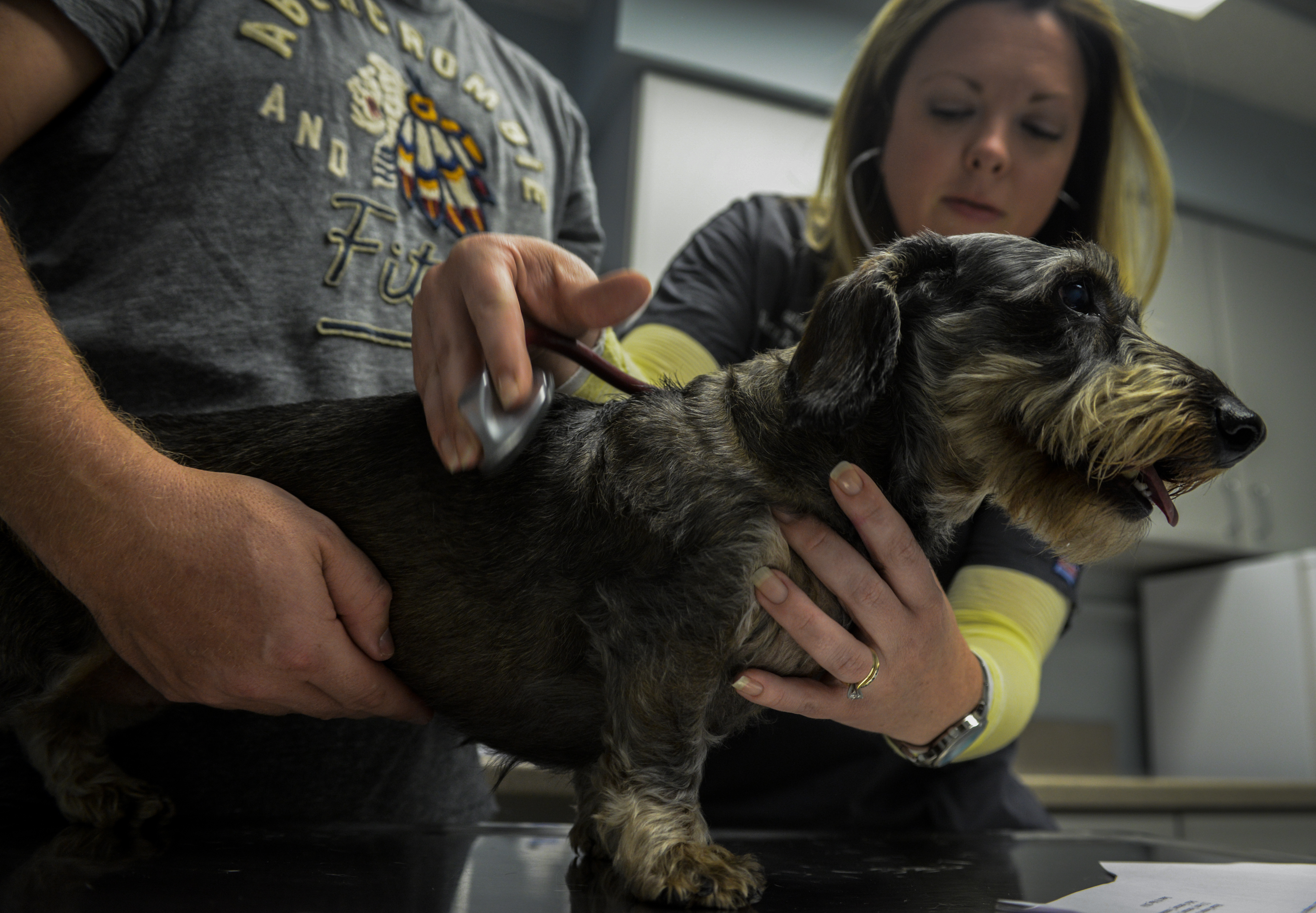
Health Check By Vet for Certificate

Globally, a health certificate validated by a veterinarian is required within two weeks of the travel date. The veterinarians carry out laboratory tests in accordance with importing country requirements, undergo specified pre-export treatments, perform the final pre-export health examination and inspect the transport cages. The certificate provides confidence for the importing country that the animal has been correctly prepared for travel. An Animal Health Certificate, or ‘AHC’ is required for any accompanied pets travelling from the UK to the EU. An Export Health Certificate is required by most destinations outside of Europe and America and is also required for any unaccompanied pet travel to Europe.

== Pet carrier ==
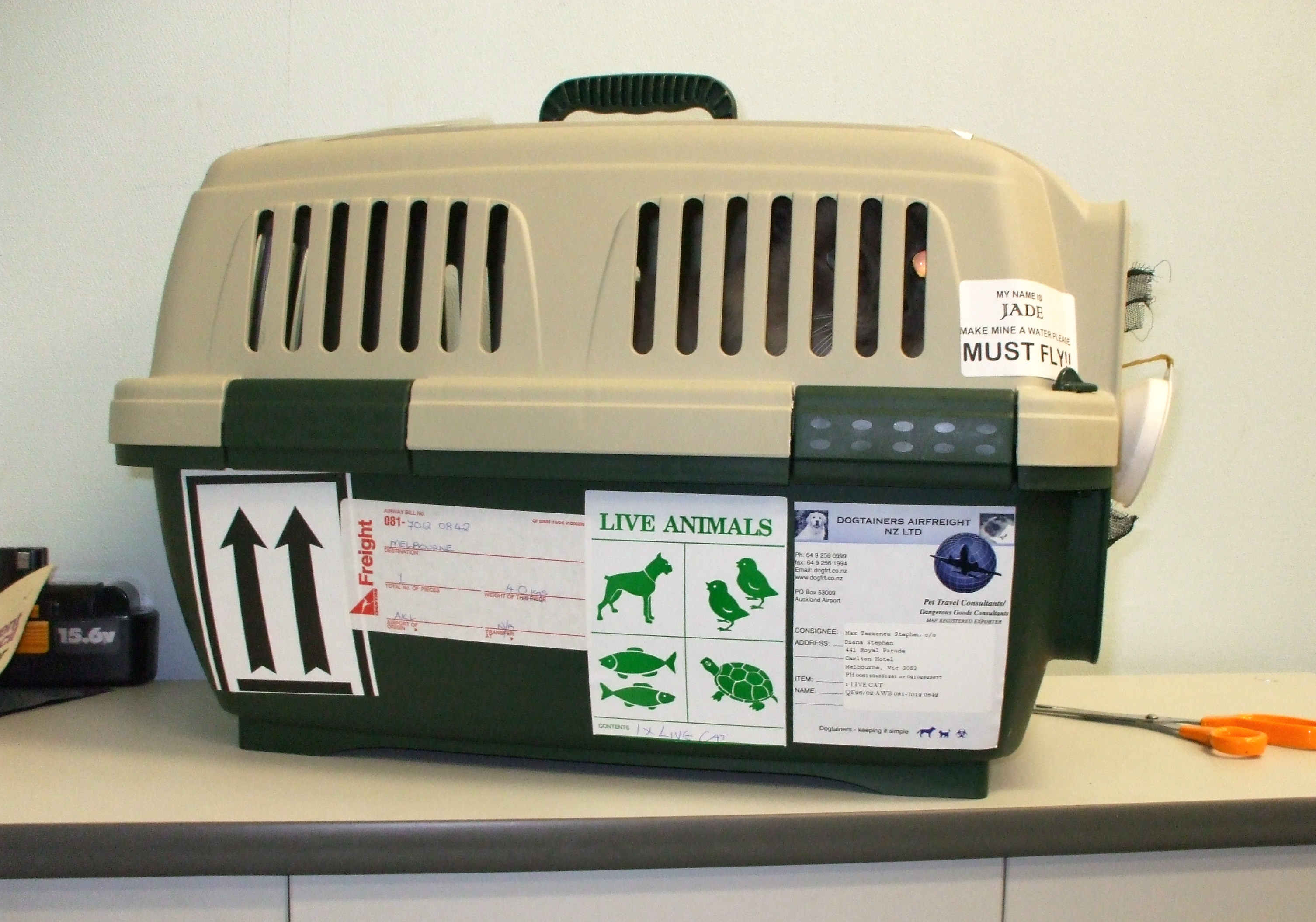
Plastic Travel Pet Carrier, Labelled

Pets are transported within a carrier that meets the International Air Transport Association standards, ensuring safety throughout travel. The International Air Transport Association requires the carrier to be large enough for the animal to sit, stand and lie comfortably within it, with a solid floor base. Fourteen percent of the floor and walls must be open to allow adequate ventilation and airflow, with shelter for protection. Handles are required for the crate to be carried, a label (with the owner's details) for identification, an arrow (indicating the way it should be placed and carried), and food and water bowls for long journeys. The International Air Transport Association recommends getting the pet accustomed to the space before departure to reduce frightened behavior caused by the foreign enclosed environment.

== Banned breeds ==
Breed Specific Legislation are rules and regulations that place restrictions on breeds from being imported into a country. 52 countries have some form of breed-specific legislation, restricting animals due to legal presumption that they are dangerous or vicious.

=== Australia ===
Cat breeds such as the Savannah cat, Safari cat, Chausie, and Bengal cat are banned from entering Australia, according to the Environmental Protection and Biodiversity Conservation Act of 1999. Dog breeds such as wolfhounds, Japanese Tosa, Pit-bull Terrier, Presa Canario, and the Fila Brasileiro are banned under the legislation of the Department of Home Affairs.

=== United States ===
American Pit Bull Terrier, Staffordshire Bull Terrier, American Staffordshire Terrier, American Bulldog, and American Mastiff are banned dog breeds by the federal government of the United States.

=== United Kingdom ===
The Parliament of the United Kingdom implemented the Dangerous Dogs Act 1991, which prohibits the Pit Bull Terrier, Japanese Tosa, Dogo Argentino, and the Fila Brasileiro from entering the UK.

== Process ==
Pets can be shipped as carry-on baggage, checked baggage or in the cargo of an aeroplane. If the animal is small enough to fit under the passenger seat in an airline-compliant carrier (such as kittens, rabbits and Maltese Shih-Tzu dogs), some airlines allow the pet in the cabin of the plane as carry-on baggage. Larger dogs (such as a full-grown Labrador) and cats are flown as checked baggage in the climate controlled sections of the cargo hold.

Alternatively, pets can be shipped via ground transport. Platforms like CitizenShipper help owners find professional pet transporters for a small fee. Ground transport is generally considered a safer option than air travel due to decreased stress on the animal. Ground transport also carries fewer risks and restrictions and is more convenient for pet owners and breeders.

All required paperwork is provided by the owner at check-in. They are then placed in a pet carrier that is approved by the International Air Transport Association and relocated to a separate baggage handling area specifically for animals. Animals are the last of the baggage to board the plane, to reduce the amount of time in the confined space. Baggage handlers strap animal crates in place and wrap them with perforated air cushion rolls. Cargo hold size and conditions depend on the airline and type of plane the pet is being flown in. For most planes, the baggage area is directly below the passenger cabins. To meet restrictions set by the ‘Animal Welfare Act’, airlines do not travel in extreme hot or cold temperatures to avoid increasing health risks. Pets remain in the carrier and are not accessed by cabin crew throughout the duration of the flight. When the flight arrives at the destination, ground staff ensure pets are unloaded as soon as possible after landing.

== Risks ==
=== Animal stress ===
A 2002 study by the Canadian Journal of Veterinary Research on the physiology and behavior of dogs during air transport, revealed the stress that was placed on animals during the shipping process. Higher salivary cortisol levels and heart rates were measured, signifying the physical pressure of the confined cargo hold and lack of adequate ventilation placed on the animal's body.

=== Risk of breeds ===
Animals from ‘Brachycephalic’ (pushed faced) breeds, such as bulldogs, pugs, and Persian cats, are prone to respiratory problems. Their short nasal passages makes them particularly vulnerable to oxygen deprivation and heat stroke during the process of pet shipping. Most airlines prohibit these breeds from being shipped due to the associated health risks.

=== Sedation ===
The International Air Transport Association regulations do not recommend sedating or tranquillising pets during shipment as it can increase the risk of breathing and vascular problems. Sedation remains the main cause of death whilst shipping an animal as the effect that the drug has upon the animal is uncertain and cannot be predicted before travel. Airlines no longer accept sedated pets on board their aircraft.

== Quarantine ==
Quarantine is a process where the pet remains isolated in a quarantine facility to prevent the spread of infectious disease in the local destination. This process is required for strict rabies-free countries such as Australia, New Zealand and Singapore. For Australia, all pets must be imported into Melbourne and quarantined in the post entry facility for a minimum of 10 days. An extension of the quarantine period is necessary when biosecurity risks are increased, such as finding a tick on the pet. All quarantine processes must be approved by International Pet and Animal Transport Association pet agents before release. North America, South America, Europe, and Asia do not require quarantine periods.

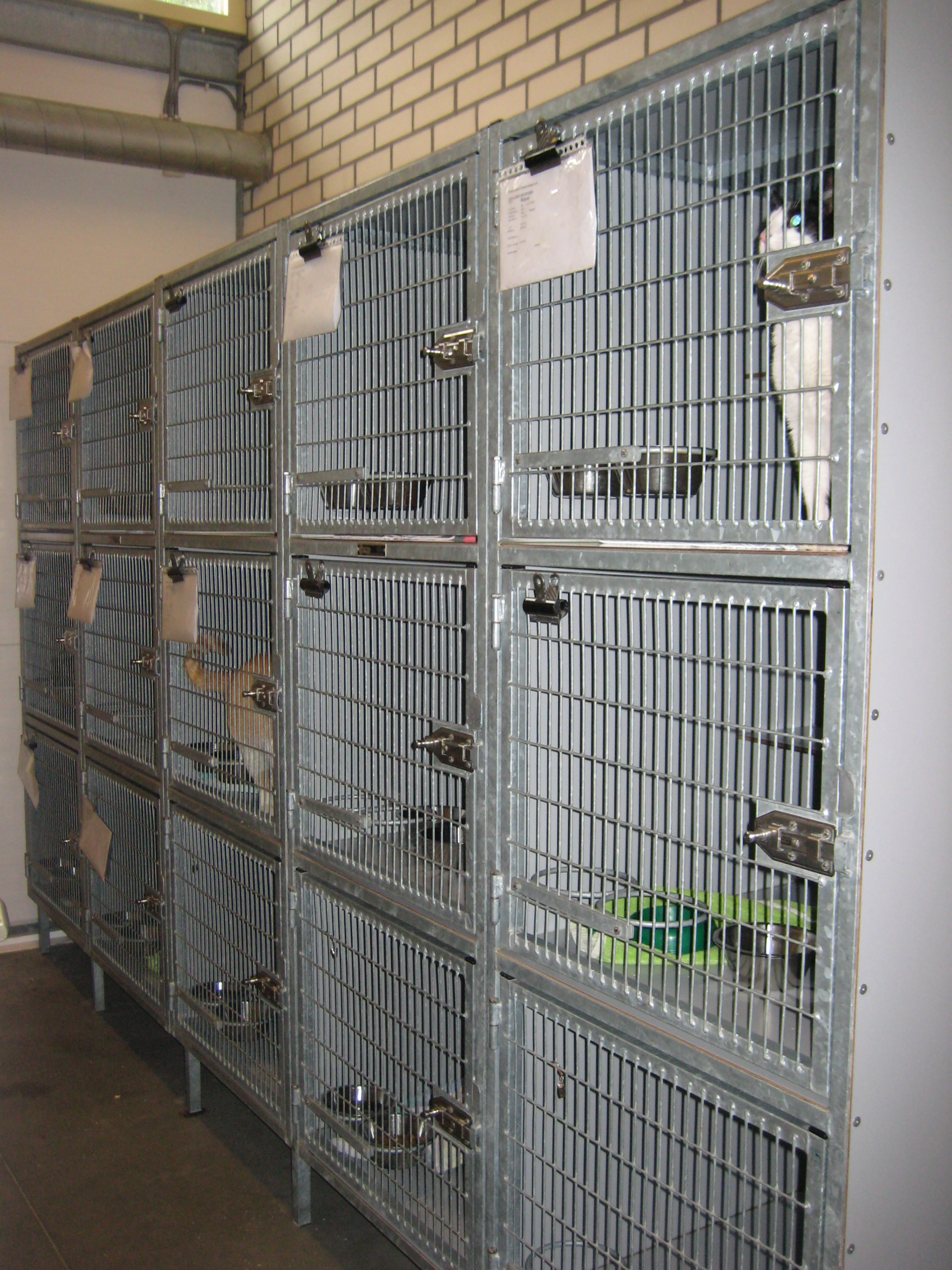
Quarantine Animal Shelter

== Controversy ==
United Airlines has recorded the highest animal death rate from 2015–2017, responsible for 75% of all the deaths in 2017, data kept by the United States Department of Transportation. This high death rate may be associated with their acceptance of brachycephalic breeds, which other airline carriers do not allow due to the increased risk. In 2018, for instance, a 10-month year old bulldog died on United airlines flight as a flight attendant placed the carrier in the cabin overhead compartment.

United Airlines accepts brachycephalic breeds as they believe pet owners rely on United to ship their pets and without the airline taking this risk they would have to sell their animals.

People for the Ethical Treatment of Animals urges all airlines to prohibit companion animals from being flown as checked baggage due to the confusion, noise, extreme temperatures and improper pressurisation of the cargo holds during travel.

== Improved procedures ==
Contracts that govern the shipment of pets have been improved by stating all of the risks associated with pet shipping, ensuring owners understand the serious procedure involved. The ‘Safe Air Travel for Animals Act’ was introduced in 1999 by Sen. Frank Lautenberg and Rep. Robert Menendez. The act requires US airlines to report monthly on any animal death, injury or loss, allowing pet owners to compare the safety records of airlines.

‘Pet Airways’ was the first pet-only airline, established in 2009, which transported unaccompanied pets in the cabin area of the plane. Attention is refocused on the pets, reducing the potential risks of live animal shipping by cargo. The company ceased operations in 2011.

Several airlines have changed the way the animal carriers are moved. Removal of the live animal cargo from the routine baggage handling reduces rough handling, decreases the possibility of animal escape and limits the pet exposure to temperature variations.

== See also ==
- Pet passport
- Pet
- Pet travel
