= Pet taxi =

Type of transportation taxi service that transports various pets

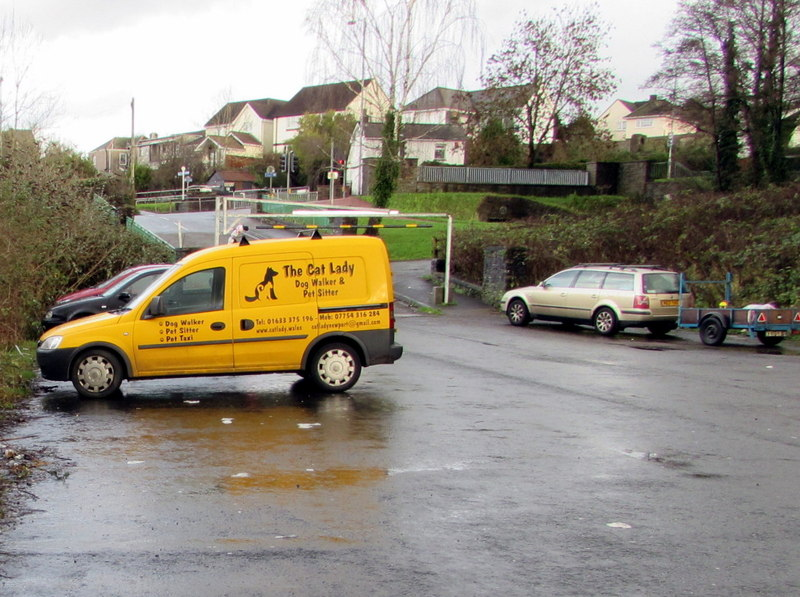
A pet taxi parked in Newport, Wales.

A pet taxi is a type of transportation taxi service that transports various pets. Some pet taxi services also provide pet ambulance, animal boarding and grooming services. Some pet sitting companies may also offer pet taxi services. Some pet taxis charge by the mile, while others may offer a flat rate for various trips. Less commonly, some pet taxi services may offer long-distance pet transportation, such as a trip from New York City to Florida.

Trip itineraries may include trips to veterinarians, pet sitting services, kennels and pet spas. Transportation to and from airports may occur because standard taxicabs may not allow pets. Clientele may include people who do not have the time or means to transport their own pets.

Pet taxis may transport several animals at one time. Pet carriers in several sizes may be used in the transportation of the animals.

== See also ==
- Animal Transportation Association
- Dog daycare
- Dog walking
- Pet passport
- Pet travel
- Transportation of animals
  - Animal transporter
