= Movement of animals =

Movement of animals may refer to:

- Movement of Animals, a text by Aristotle
- Animal locomotion
- Transportation of animals
