= Housebroken =

Housebroken may refer to:

- Housebreaking, the process of training a domesticated animal to excrete outdoors
- HouseBroken, an American adult animated sitcom created by Jennifer Crittenden, Clea DuVall, and Gabrielle Allan
