= Animal movement =

Animal movement may refer to:

- Animal locomotion
- Animal migration
- Animal rights movement and animal welfare movement collectively
- Transportation of animals
