= Pet travel =

Process of traveling with or transporting pets

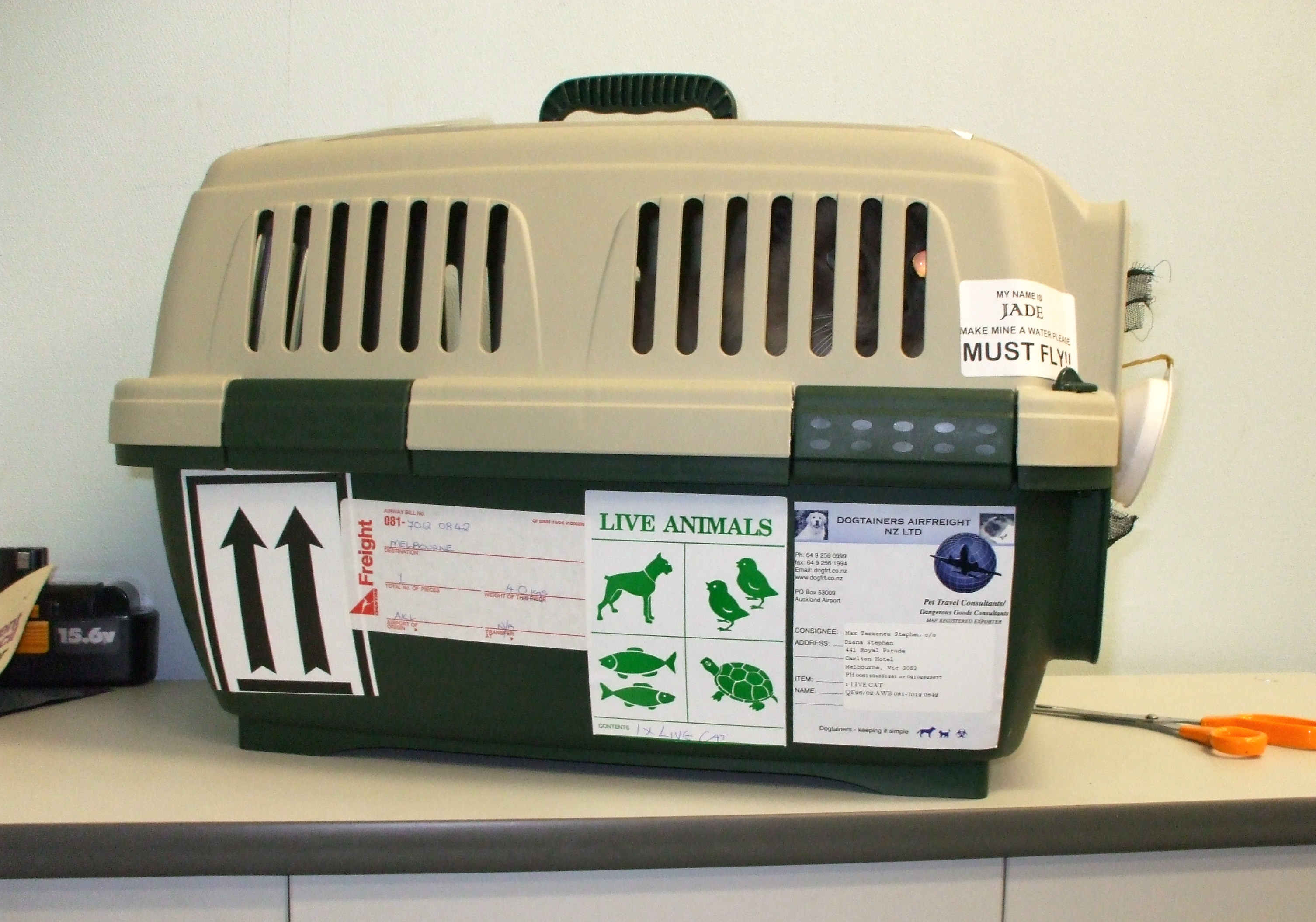
A cat pet carrier, IATA regulated for air travel

Pet travel is the process of traveling with or transporting pets. Pet carriers like cat carriers and dog crates confine and protect pets during travel.

== Animal stress ==
Pets may experience stress and anxiety in unfamiliar situations or locations. Cats are especially stressed by change. Instead of travelling with their owner on vacation, pets can be boarded at kennels or kept at home with a friend or pet sitter. However, that also includes unfamiliar situations and locations. This is not an option when moving permanently.

== Travel methods ==
=== Air travel ===
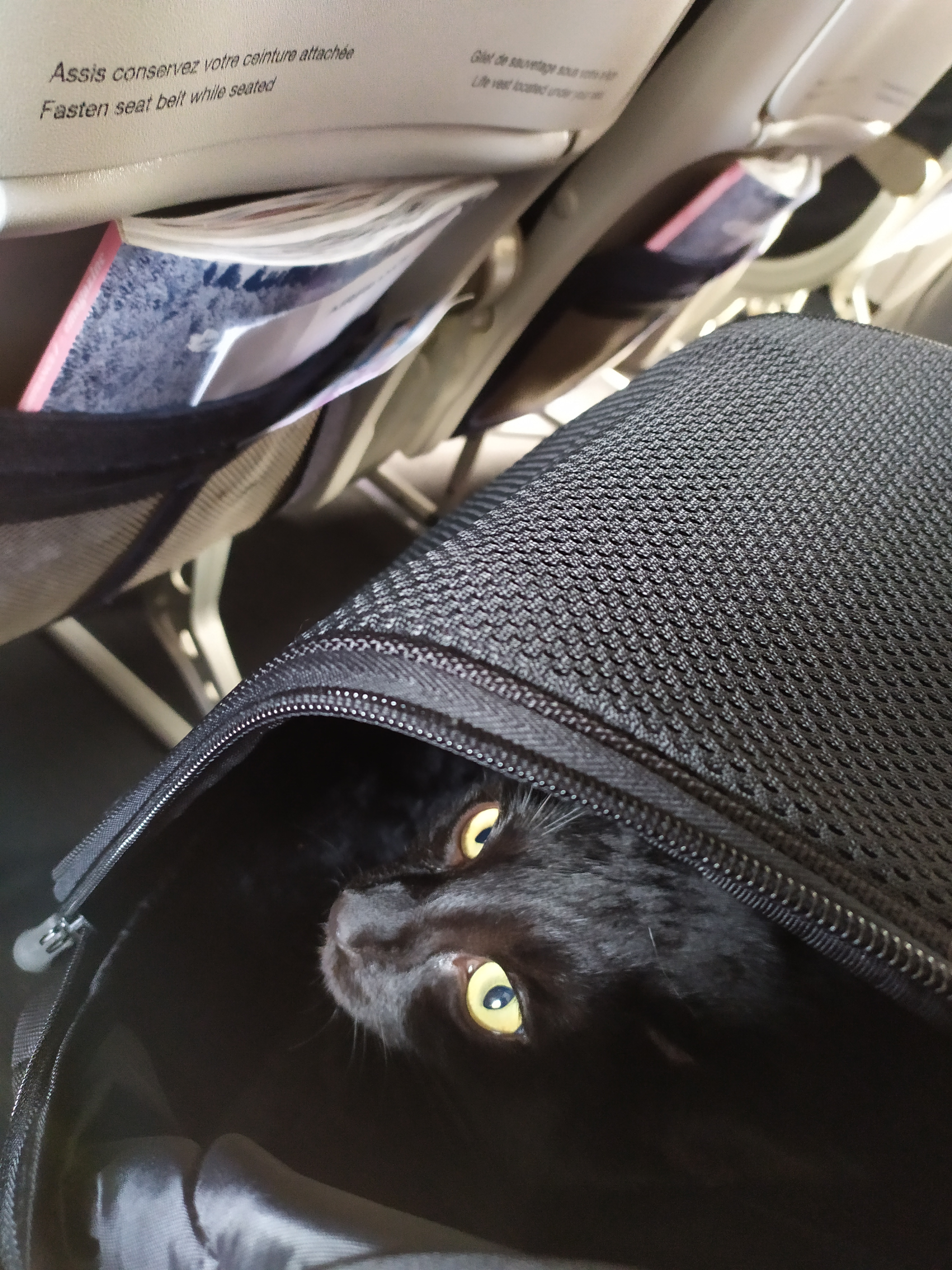
Cat traveling in the passenger cabin of an Air France aircraft

Pets may travel in the aircraft cabin, checked baggage, or as cargo. However, airlines set their own policies regarding the travel of pets. Some major airlines have discontinued pet cargo and now allow only in-cabin travel. Most airlines also charge for emotional support animals. Pet Airways specialised in transporting pets but later ceased operations. In recent years, private-jet pet travel has gained momentum especially due to discounted flight sales. In such travels pets are allowed in the cabin with their owners, which reduces stress and trauma. However, unlike flying commercial airlines where ticket fees are paid one-off up-front, there may be extra costs involved in private jet flights with pets onboard, such as cleaning fees and de-icing fees. These costs may only be known post-flight.

The Humane Society of the United States recommends avoiding air travel if possible. Extreme temperatures and thin air have extra risk for brachycephalic animals such as bulldogs, Pekingese dogs, pugs and Persian cats. The United States Department of Transportation Air Travel Reports recorded 302 deaths, injuries and disappearances over 6 years with 35 deaths in 2011. At least two dogs died on United Airlines flights in 2012.

If pets escape, they can face danger, even if they escape on the ground. A cat named Jack escaped from his carrier in American Airlines' baggage handling at John F. Kennedy Airport, went missing for 61 days, and was eventually euthanized. Another cat escaped and was run over by a vehicle on the tarmac at Indira Gandhi International Airport in Delhi, India when traveling with Jet Airways.

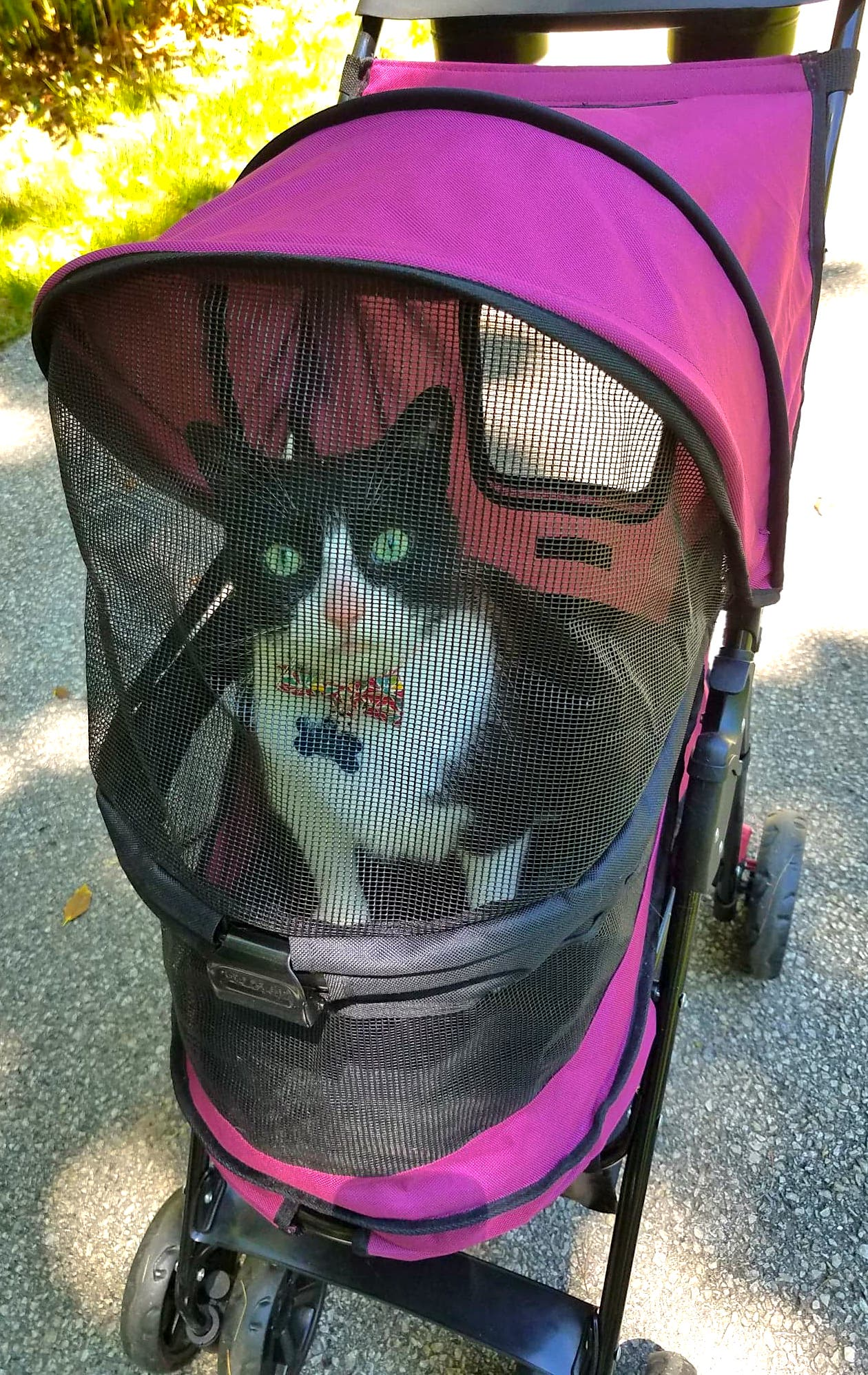
Cat inside a pet stroller

==== Controversy ====
In 2018, United Airlines admitted to forcing a passenger pet to be stowed away in an overhead bin, resulting in the animal's death. Only two days later, another dog aboard a United flight was mistakenly sent to Japan instead of its intended Kansas City destination. A similar incident occurred in March 2018 when Delta Air Lines sent a puppy to Salt Lake City instead of its intended Boise destination.

=== Car travel ===
Pets riding in cars are safest contained in carriers tied with a seat belt. They are advised to be in the back seat or have the airbags turned off. Dog harnesses can restrain the pet properly in the case of an accident, but only if it is one of the few products certified by the center for pet safety. Unrestrained pets can interfere with driving and can be seriously injured in an accident, but no states require pets to be secured in cars.

=== Pet strollers ===
Smaller domestic animals can be ambulated locally in a pet stroller pushed or pulled by a human; this may be especially useful for ill, lame, and elderly creatures. A pet stroller is similar in design to a baby stroller. The stroller may be enclosed with netting to prevent escape while allowing the pet to view, hear, and smell the ambient environment. Unlike a human infant, the animal is not immobilized in the stroller, but is free to move about within it.

== Import, export and quarantine regulations ==
=== China (Mainland) ===
According to the General Administration of Customs of China, since 2019, each passport holder is allowed to import into mainland China, one pet cat or dog per passport holder without any permit requirements. Provided that the pet cat or pet dog has an ISO 11784/11785-compliant microchip implant and has a rabies vaccination certificate and negative rabies titer test result from an approved laboratory, and a veterinary certificate (attained within 14 days before arrival), all obtained no less than 30 days prior to arrival into mainland China, such pets may avoid 30 days' quarantine.

Pets without a microchip or such documents may have to enter mainland China through designated ports and go through a mandatory 30-day quarantine. The designated ports are:

- Beijing Capital International Airport
- Beijing Daxing International Airport
- Beijing West railway station
- Shanghai Hongqiao International Airport
- Shanghai Pudong International Airport
- Shanghai railway station
- Shanghai International Passenger Transport Center
- Wusongkou International Cruise Terminal (Lujiazui)
- Ürümqi Diwopu International Airport
- Alashankou Port
- Guangzhou Baiyun International Airport

=== Hong Kong SAR ===
According to the Agriculture, Fisheries and Conservation Department (AFCD) of Hong Kong, for the import of cats and dogs from the following countries/territories—Category I & II—Special/Import permits are required but the pets may be exempt from four months' mandatory quarantine:

- Australia, Fiji, Hawaii, Ireland, Japan, New Zealand, United Kingdom, Bailiwick of Jersey, Austria, Bahrain, Bermuda, Canada, Cyprus, Finland, Germany, Guam, Italy, Luxembourg, Malta, Norway, Papua New Guinea, Seychelles, Solomon Islands, Spain, Switzerland, Taiwan, Vanuatu, Bahamas, Belgium, Brunei, Cayman Islands, Denmark, France, Gibraltar, Iceland, Jamaica, Maldives, Mauritius, New Caledonia, Portugal, Singapore, South Africa, Sweden, The Netherlands, USA (Continental), Virgin Islands.

Pet cats and dogs from other countries/territories—Category III—will have to apply for a Special/Import permit and go through a mandatory four-month quarantine upon arrival at Hong Kong, at the owner's expense, and provide proof of dogs being vaccinated against canine distemper, infectious canine hepatitis and canine parvovirus and cats being vaccinated against the feline panleucopaenia virus and feline respiratory disease complex not less than 14 days before and not more than a year before importation into Hong Kong.

All pets entering Hong Kong must enter as manifested cargo only (except for land border crossing) and must be AVID or ISO 11784/11785 microchip implanted and carry a veterinary certificate (attained with 14 days of import). Pets may exit Hong Kong in the aircraft cabin with the owner or as checked baggage. Proof of rabies vaccination is generally not required by the AFCD for importation of pet cats and dogs.

Pet animals transiting through Hong Kong also require a transit permit.

=== United Kingdom ===
A correctly prepared cat, dog, or ferret may be imported without quarantine into the United Kingdom from the following countries under the Pet Travel Scheme (PETS), but only via an authorised transport company (which includes the Channel Tunnel and most ferry services for arrivals by car).

Countries issuing pet passports recognized by the UK include all EU countries, plus Andorra, Greenland and the Faroe Islands, Iceland, Liechtenstein, Monaco, Norway, San Marino, Switzerland and Vatican City.

However, as Northern Ireland shares a land border with EU member Republic of Ireland, EU rules apply if traveling there. This means that pet owners visiting Northern Ireland from EU countries can use their pet's EU pet passport, while those arriving from outside the EU must present an EU pet health certificate.

Countries listed by the UK for this purpose: Antigua and Barbuda, Argentina, Aruba, Ascension Island, Australia, (Note: Additional rules apply to cats from Australia.) Barbados, Bahrain, Belarus, Bermuda, BES Islands (Bonaire, Saint Eustatius and Saba), Bosnia & Herzegovina, Canada, Cayman Islands, Chile, Curaçao, Falkland Islands, Fiji, French Polynesia, (Note: French DOM & TOM (French Overseas Territories)) Guadeloupe, Hong Kong, Jamaica, (Note: Although Jamaica is a qualifying country under the EU regulation, Jamaican law currently prevents the involvement of that country in PETS. PETS-prepared animals may not enter Jamaica and animals may not be prepared for PETS in Jamaica.) Japan, Malaysia, (Note: Additional rules apply to cats & dogs from Malaysia.) Réunion, Martinique, Mauritius, Mayotte, Mexico, Montserrat, New Caledonia, New Zealand, North Macedonia, Russian Federation, Saint Maarten, St. Helena, St. Kitts & Nevis, St. Pierre and Miquelon, Saint Vincent and the Grenadines, Singapore, Taiwan, Trinidad and Tobago, United Arab Emirates, USA (includes American Samoa, Guam, Northern Mariana Islands, Puerto Rico and the US Virgin Islands), Vanuatu, and Wallis and Futuna.

== See also ==
- Pet passport
- Pet sitting
- Pet taxi
- Transportation of animals
