= Housebreaking =

Act of training an animal to excrete in a designated area

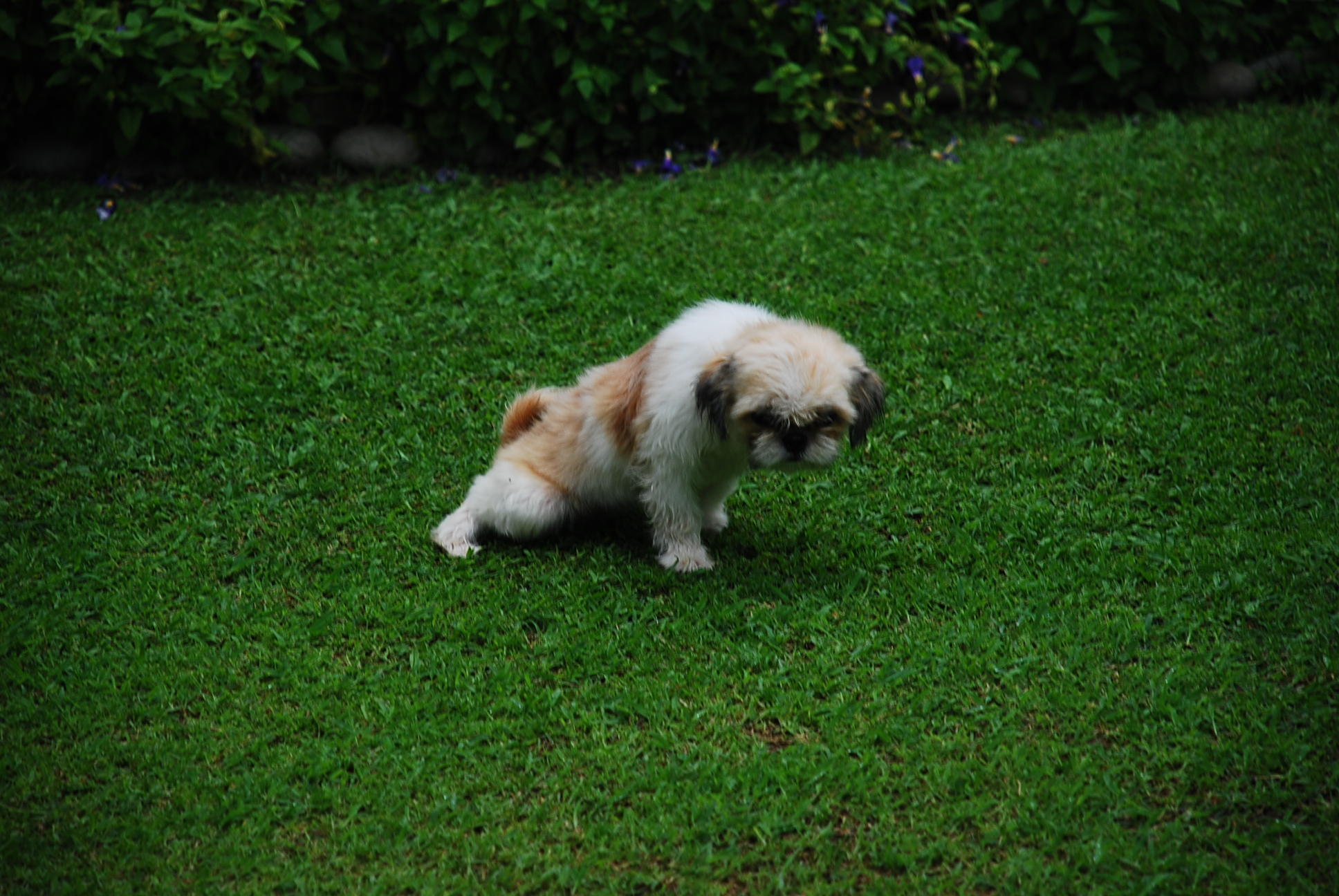
A dog trained to urinate outdoors rather than in its human owners' house

Housebreaking (American English) or house-training (British English) is the process of training a domesticated animal that lives with its human owners in a house or other residence to excrete (urinate and defecate) outdoors, or in a designated indoor area (such as an absorbent pad or a litter box), rather than to follow its instinctive behaviour randomly inside the house.

Around 840 million cats and dogs alone are owned as pets around the globe; and in the United States, seventy percent of households own a pet. The process requires patience and consistence from the human. Accidents are a part of the process, and if the pet's owner reacts negatively, it could be discouraged, and the success of the training might be delayed.

== Dogs ==
The first step in housebreaking a puppy is establishing a consistent routine. Young puppies have less control over their bladders than older dogs and require frequent trips outdoors. A commonly cited guideline is that puppies can hold their bladder for approximately one hour per month of age. When taken outside, puppies are typically brought to the same designated area to reinforce the association with elimination. Verbal cues are commonly used during this time to support the later recall of the behavior. Positive reinforcement following outdoor elimination further strengthens appropriate toileting habits. Older dogs may also require comparable levels of training and supervision when introduced to a new environment.

Punitive training methods are associated with increased anxiety and confusion in dogs, which may hinder the house-training process.

Crate training is commonly used to manage house-training when regular outdoor access is not possible, taking advantage of a dog's natural instinct to avoid soiling its resting area.

Maintaining consistency during the owner's absence is a critical aspect of housebreaking. Inconsistent routines or a lack of supervision when the primary caretaker is away can cause a regression in the animal's behavior. Ensuring that temporary caretakers adhere to the established schedule and location helps preserve the pet's toilet discipline.

== Cats ==
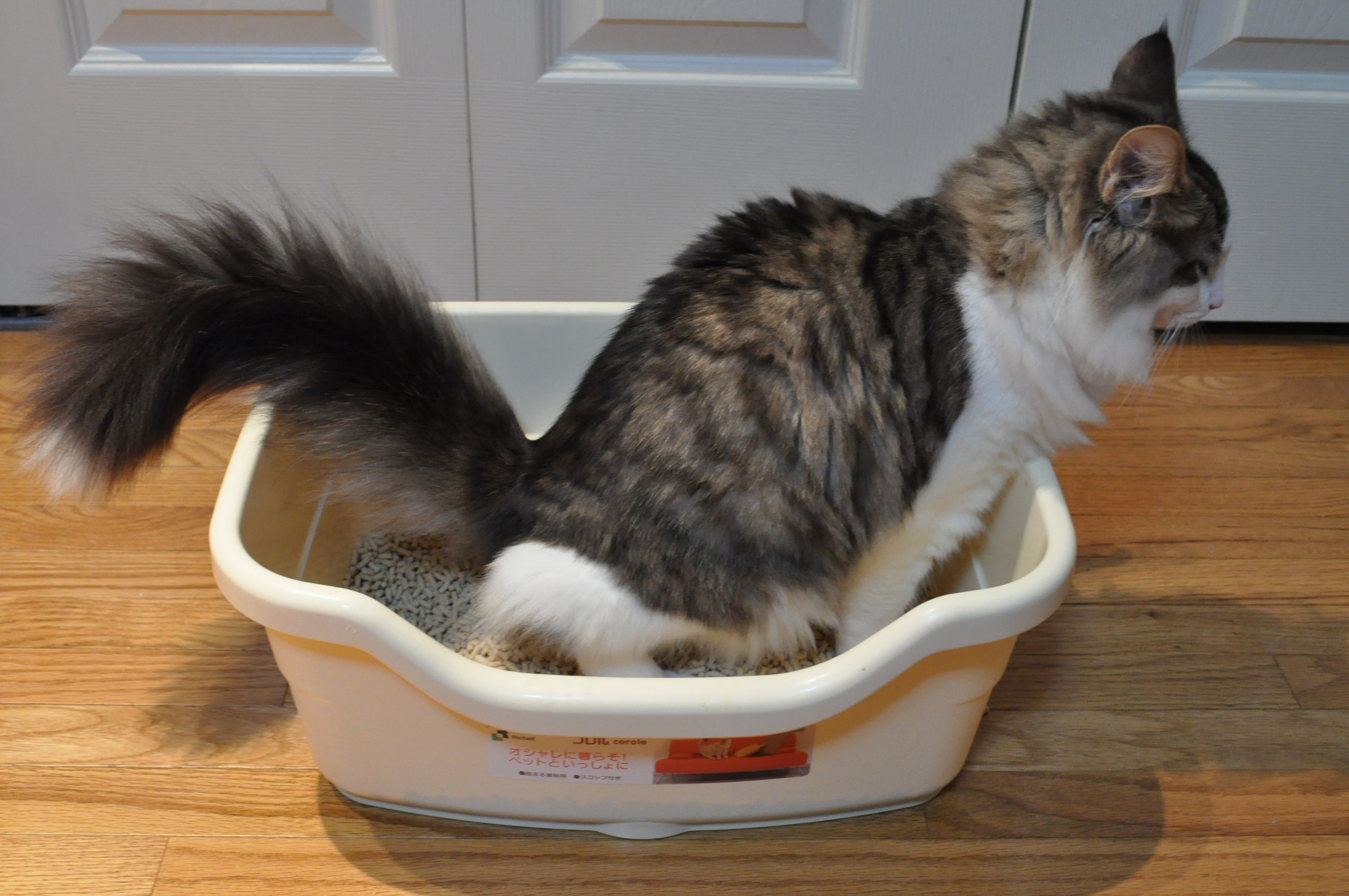
A cat prefers its litter box to be in a quiet, undisturbed area of the home

Housebreaking a kitten is different from housebreaking a puppy. A kitten's toilet area would be a litter box inside the house, rather than a particular spot outside the house. A cat's instinct is to excrete within a substrate, and then to scratch and dig to hide the excretion. Litter boxes support this natural behavior. There are several varieties of substrate for litter boxes, but according to most veterinarians, cats prefer a scent-free clumping clay substrate. Litter boxes, too, are available in different sizes and design - small, big, with walls, with a lid - and choosing a suitable one is important. Where the litter box will be located also matters: it should be in a quiet area so that the kitten would not feel agitated by the setting of its toilet area.

To introduce the kitten to its toilet area and acquaint it with the substrate, it should be placed in the prepared litter box. The kitten should be placed in the litter box again after it has eaten, as that is when its urge to excrete is the strongest. Most kittens take to litter boxes immediately if the substrate is to their liking. However, cats have different preferences, and some cats may prefer separate litter boxes for urine and feces.

While many people train their cat to use a litter box, cats can also be housebroken like a dog. However, this process requires more careful effort, and success depends also on the age of the cat.

== See also ==
- Crate training
- Litter box
