= CitizenShipper =

CitizenShipper LLC
- Company type: Private
- Website type: Online auction
- Founded: 2008
- Area served: United States
- Industry: Transportation, Internet
- Website: citizenshipper.com
- Launched: July 2008

CitizenShipper is an American online auction-based peer-to-peer shipping marketplace. The platform is used to arrange transportation for items including vehicles, boats, and pets.

== History ==
Physicist Richard Obousy founded CitizenShipper in 2008.

The company's website is designed to match people who need items shipped economically to certain locations with people already traveling in those directions, thus reducing overall carbon emissions. Obousy believes clients "can make a significant impact on reducing the country's carbon footprint." CitizenShipper is available nationally and now has drivers in all 50 U.S. states.

== Recognition ==
CitizenShipper has been included in media coverage of independent and felxible employment opportunities, including articles published by Los Angeles Times and Entrepreneur. The New York Times has also discussed the service as an option for transporting pets by ground rather than air.

In a study of how to differentiate companies, Inc. said CitizenShipper "built on its core platform by adding proven, value-rich features over time" instead of trying to invent completely new services.
