= Crate training =

Process in pet training

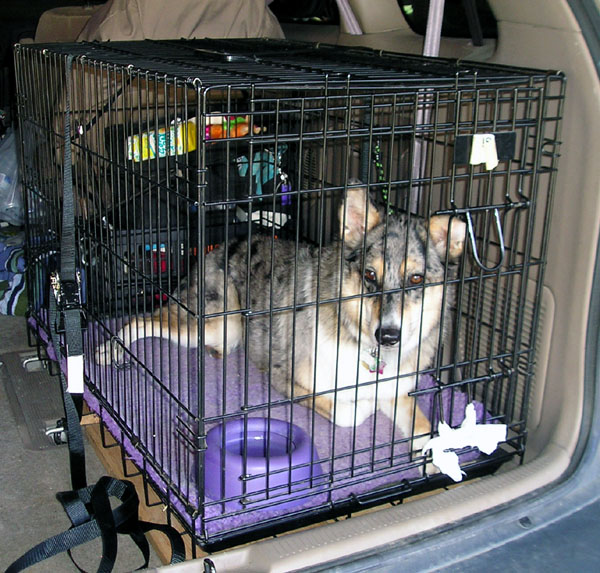
A dog in a wire crate strapped into a car for safe traveling

Crate training is the process of training a pet to tolerate confinement in a dog crate or cage. Crate advocates often claim that dogs are "den-dwelling" animals and that a crate can become a "den" substitute and a familiar and safe location for the pet. Most puppies can eventually tolerate crate training if it is introduced properly. The initial stress from being confined can give way to "increased feelings of security, safety, and comfort" after repeated exposure to the crate. Long-term or excessive crate confinement "may lead to emotional and behavioral deterioration over time." On the other hand, if properly done, crate training can play a major role in housebreaking a dog as fast as possible. Confining a dog in a crate or cage restricts its movement and freedom, If crate training is not taken seriously, the dog may start soiling around the house.

== Rationale ==
Proponents of crate training argue that dogs are den animals and that the crate acts as a substitute for a den. While this is a widely held belief, there is little evidence to support it. Borchelt (1984) states:

The average dog book refers to dogs as "den dwelling" animals and presumes that confining imparts a feeling of security to a puppy. Dogs, in fact, are not den dwelling animals, although in a variety of canids the dam will construct a nest (often underground) for the pups. The nest is a defense against predators and protection against inclement weather. The pups use it as a "home base" from which they explore, investigate and play. There is no door on the den which encloses the pups for many hours.

Nevertheless, a dog can learn to tolerate confinement in a crate and accept it as a place of comfort and safety. The Humane Society of the United States recommends crate training to create a place of security and comfort for a dog, while cautioning that it is not the best solution to animal behavior problems.

Crate training may also reduce stress and anxiety in a dog that later requires confinement in a crate when visiting a vet, when traveling, during recuperation from an injury, and when confinement is necessary to protect your dog while you are away for short periods of time.

== Crate selection ==
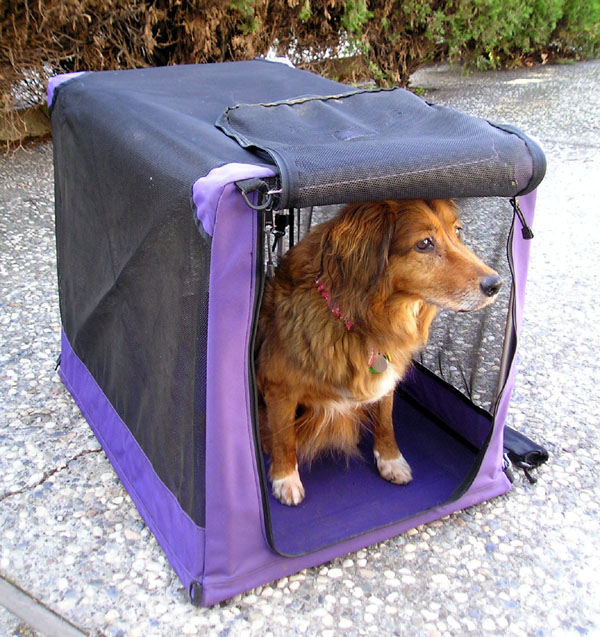
A dog in a soft crate

It is important to pick a crate that is the correct size for the pet and is appropriate for its purpose. Often larger crates come with some sort of divider so that a crate can grow with the pet. The correct size for a crate is just enough room for the animal to stand up without hitting their head, lay down and stretch out their paws and to turn around unimpeded. When using a crate in the home, make sure the crate is placed in a location that is comfortable. Avoid drafty areas near doors or windows, areas in the direct sunlight (which may become excessively hot), or areas adjacent to a radiator or heat source.

A crate for use at home can be larger than one used for travel. Crates used for international transport should adhere to international regulations stipulated by IATA. If the crate is too big the pet will be able to use one end for rest and sleep while using the other as a toilet, which will undermine one of the purposes of crate training.

A dog's natural instinct is to relieve themselves outside of the area in which they eat and sleep. So if a crate is small enough that they cannot possibly defecate while having enough room to sleep well away from it, a dog will 'hold it' as long as they possibly can. It is this instinct that facilitates using a crate as an aid for house training.

During air travel, an oversized cage does not permit the pet to use the sides easily as a brace during turbulence. Likewise, crates that are too small pose a health risk by restricting and preventing proper air flow and ventilation. This is of particular concern to domestic pets of a brachycephalic (short-headed) breed where the requirement is to allow extra room due to the high incidence of death in these pets during transport. Due to their shortened airways and limited ability to cool themselves through panting, overheating while traveling poses a risk to the health of such breeds.

== Training ==
When crate training, it is important to use a training approach that is recommended by a reputable vet, trainer, breeder or a trusted training book.

Crate training is often practiced with new puppies as a method of house-training. Puppies naturally do not want to dirty the place where they sleep, so they will try as much as possible to hold it while they are in their crate. Of course, young puppies can not control their bladders for long: about one hour for every month of age. Owners of young dogs will have to continue to take the puppy outside frequently. The crate is the only space in the entire house that truly belongs to the dog, and if used appropriately, will become a safe haven for years to come.

Locking the dog in a crate and letting it whine, bark, or attempt to escape is common, but such approaches may create a negative association with crating. The dog should be slowly accustomed to the crate by making it inviting, for example by placing familiar toys or pet bed inside, leaving items with the owner's scent, rewarding the dog for entering and staying in the crate, incorporating it into play and feeding routines, and gradually progressing to sleeping in the crate overnight.

Part of proper crate or cage training requires that the pet owner observe calm and relaxed behavior around the crate. The pet will attribute any emotional responses such as raised voices or other nervous behaviors to the foreign object in their normal environment. It is important for the owner not to create any negative associations with the cage in order for the pet to accept the crate in a calm manner.

== Adverse effects ==
Without proper conditioning, dogs may vocalize their distress and make efforts to escape the crates. Crating suppresses the dog's behavior, removes the dog's freedom of movement and is a negative punishment (removal of reward) under operant conditioning. Dogs who do not react well to negative punishment may find crating highly stressful. Long term or excessive crate confinement "may lead to emotional and behavioral deterioration over time." To the extent that crating reduces the amount of exposure to different environmental and social situations, it can make dogs more reactive (fearful or aggressive) or intolerant of novel situations. Crating "may significantly exacerbate the distress and emotional reactivity associated with separation distress". Behavioral problems that compels owners to crate train in the first place, may be exacerbated by the negative effects of crating.

A dog may form a strong attachment to the crate eventually, feeling comfort and safety, after the initial feeling of distress and vulnerability. One dog behaviorist has compared this behavioral effect to Stockholm syndrome. Dogs that are trained to sleep in a crate, when allowed to sleep in a bedroom, can show signs consistent with that of separation distress, suggesting that dogs may love their crate "perhaps in some cases more than they love the owner." This bond with the crate may interfere with the human-animal bond and exacerbate bond-related behavior problems such as separation distress and owner-directed aggression.

Steven Lindsay in Handbook of Applied Dog Behavior and Training states that while "the role of crate confinement in the etiology of behavior problems has not been scientifically established [...] empirical impressions and logic dictate that it probably plays an important role in the development or exacerbation of many adjustment problems." He argues that "the widespread practice of routinely caging a dog at night and then again during the day for periods totaling 16 to 18 hours (or more) is an extremely problematic practice that should not be condoned or encouraged, because it probably underlies the development of many adjustment problems, including aggression." The purpose of crate training, he says, "should be to get the dog out of the crate as soon as possible, and to use the crate as little as possible in the service of training and space-management objectives."

== Legislation ==
In Sweden, regulations forbid keeping dogs in cages or other enclosures below a certain size. Exceptions are made for some situations, such as during travels or at dog shows/trials. Even then, the dogs have to be walked every two hours or three hours. The size required for an enclosure to be exempt from such regulations starts at 2 m^{2} (22 sq ft)—about the area of a single/twin mattress—for a small dog and up to 5.5 m^{2} (59 sq ft) for a large dog. Similar regulations exist in Finland.

Spain's animal cruelty laws forbid the practice. There it is prohibited to "use any gadget, mechanism or utensil intended to limit or impede their mobility except by veterinary prescription taking into account their well-being." Pet owners must "educate and handle the animal with methods that do not cause suffering or mistreatment of the animal, nor cause states of anxiety or fear."
