= Animal transporter =

Transport for moving animals

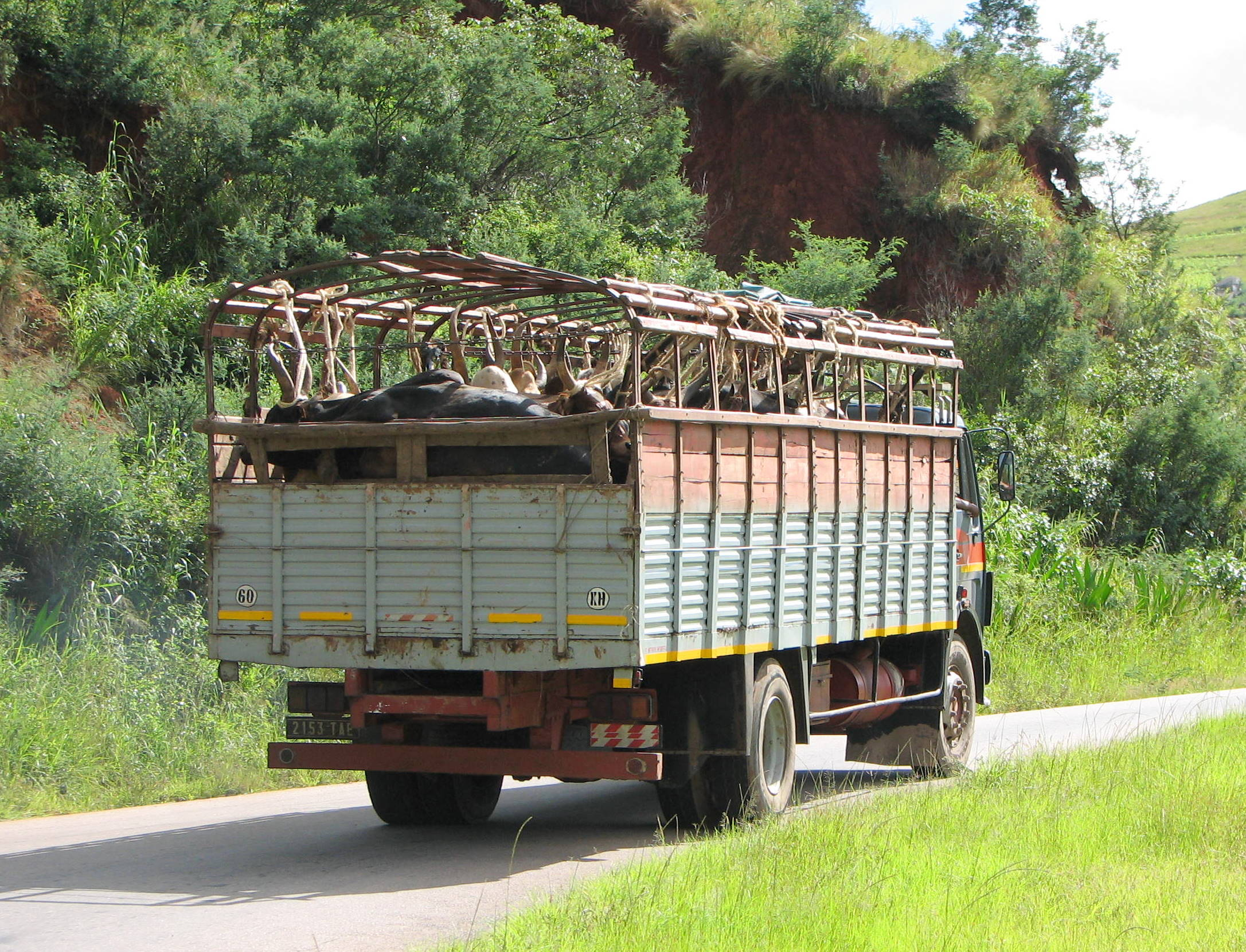
Transport of zebus, Madagascar

Animal transporters are used to transport livestock or non-livestock animals over long distances. They may be specially-modified vehicles, trailers, ships or aircraft containers. While some animal transporters like horse trailers only carry a few animals, modern ships engaged in live export can carry tens of thousands.

The Animal Transportation Association is the primary organization advocating for humane animal transport.

== See also ==
- Animal-powered transport
- Drover's caboose
- Horse box
- Horse trailer
- livestock carrier (Maritime)
- Livestock transportation
- Road transport
- Stock car (rail)
