= Pet carrier =

Objects used to transport animals

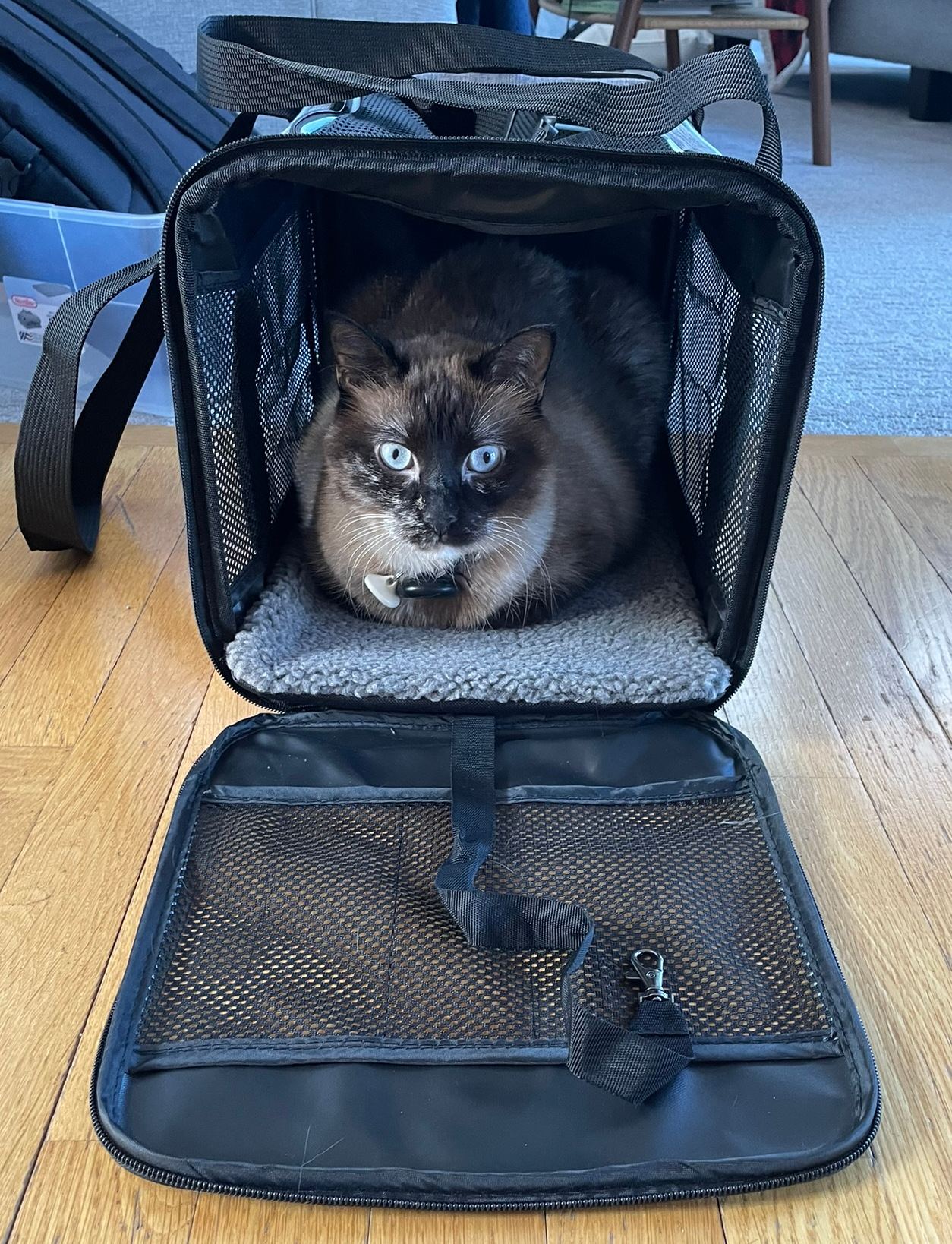
Cat in a soft side pet carrier

Pet carriers are small portable boxes, crates, or cages used to transport small animals such as cats, lap dogs, miniature pigs, ferrets, chickens, guinea pigs, and so on, from one location to another.

The two main types are the front openers (these are generally tough plastic boxes with a metal door, such as dog crates) and top openers (these are generally more like cages with a hinged roof), although there are other types. A carrier usually has a handle on top, although some are easier to carry in one's arms rather than using the handle.

== Styles ==
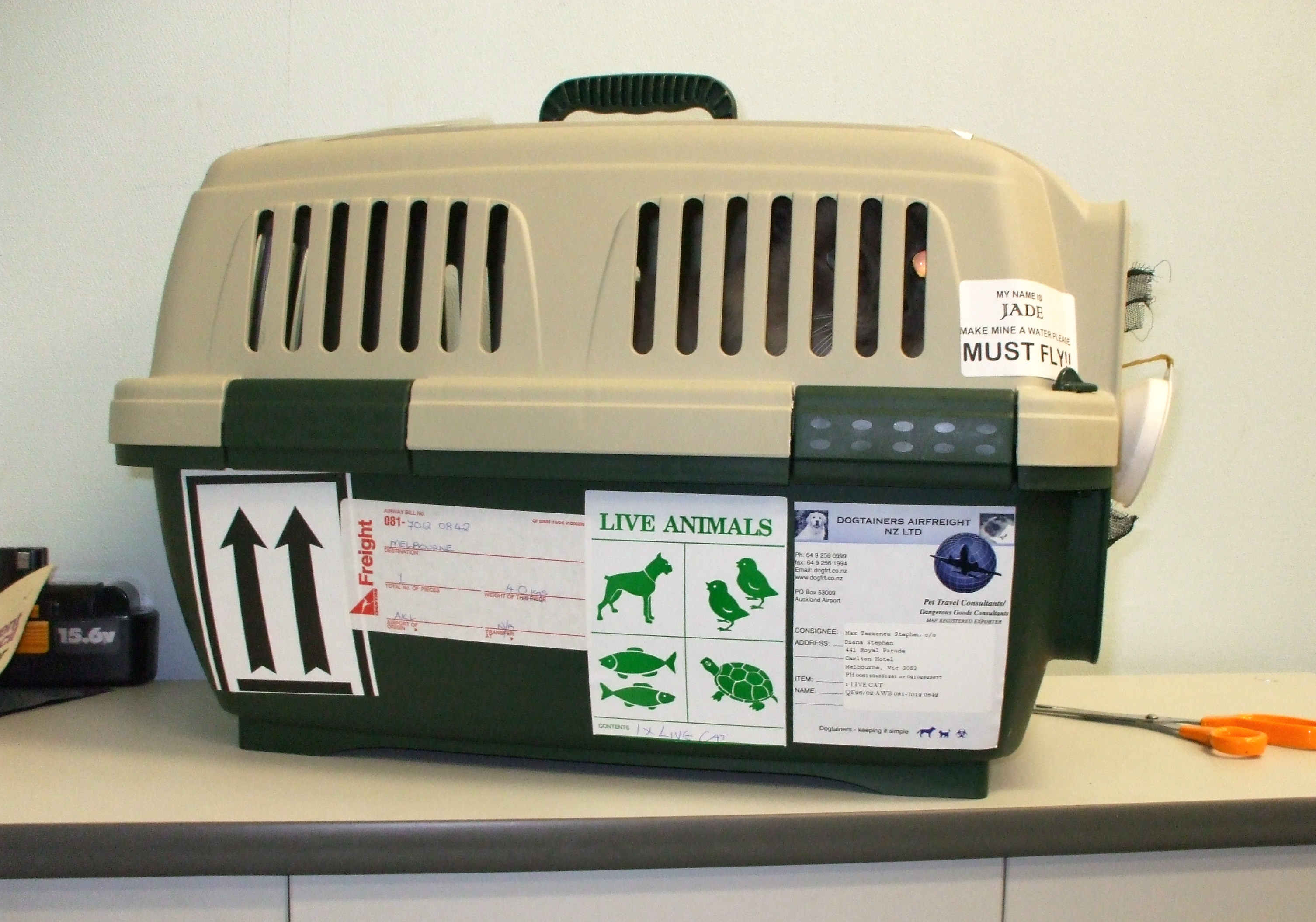
Dog Carrier for travel

There are different types and styles of pet carriers available, according to one's specific needs, such as for when traveling by airplane or car and for a pet's species, weight, and size.

- Airline pet carriers

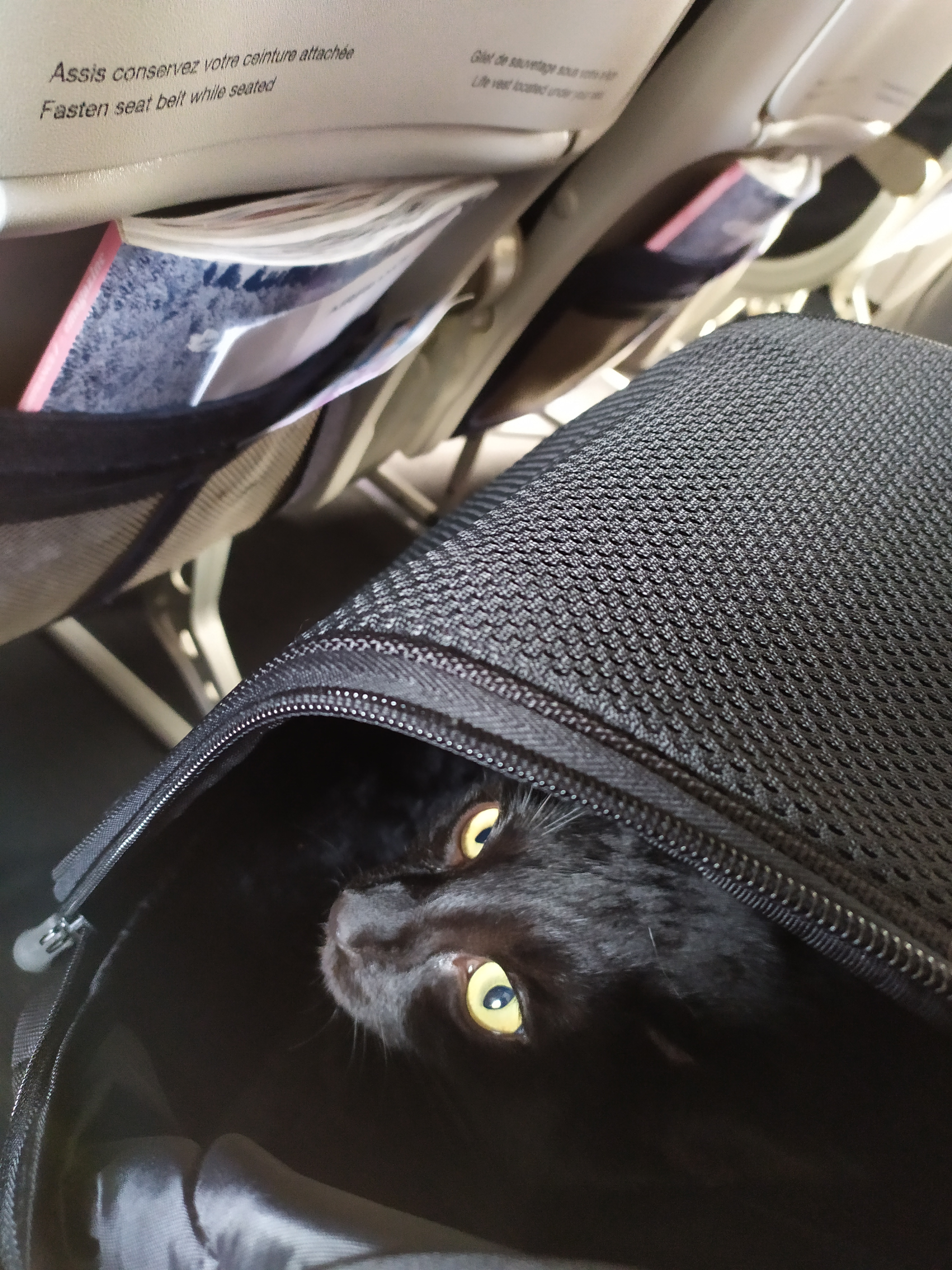
Cat traveling in the passenger cabin of an Air France aircraft

When traveling by plane, each airline has its own specifications and requirements to make sure that the pet and other passengers travel safely and comfortably. Some airlines allow travelers to bring their pet on board if they are comfortably accommodated in an airline-approved pet carrier. Even then, usually only small dogs and cats can go in the cabin; otherwise, they have to be in the cargo hold, in specially designed crates such as dog crates.

For pets in the cabin, the general rule is that the carrier must fit underneath the seat in the front of the owner and it must have a waterproof bottom. Also, the carrier must be big enough for the pet to turn around, stand up, and lie down. Furthermore, the kennel has to be ventilated on at least three sides. Crates or kennels that are used in cargo travel must have a metal door that is strong enough to prevent the pet bending it in any way and must have attached the name of the owner and address and also a "Live Animal This Side Up" notice.

- Backpack pet carriers

Backpack pet carriers are suitable for smaller pets when walking. They are also convenient for hiking, shopping, road trips or appointments to the veterinarian. They feature a well-ventilated, comfortable compartment for the pet for safe and enjoyable travel. Some backpack pet carrier models are airline approved so they can be safely used while traveling by plane.

Backpack pet carriers are available in different sizes, colors, materials, and designs. Some have extra pockets which can be used for extra storage. Most of these pet carriers are designed for pets that do not weigh more than 10 lbs. They have ventilation sides and zippered sides for easy use. Some backpack carriers come with wheels which makes it possible to convert a backpack carrier into a roll-along one.

- Pet car-seat carriers

Used when traveling by car; these are also called car seats for pets. They provide safety of the pet and they come in various sizes, colors, and designs to fit on the seat of a car. Different sizes can accommodate smaller or larger pets of up to 25 lbs. They can also often be used as pet beds at home or in a hotel. Car seats are normally made of fleece and are filled with foam for comfort.

For increased safety, and for larger pets, sturdy crates are used.

- Soft-sided pet carriers
- Purse carriers

These are designed for pets that do not weigh more than 12 pounds and come in a variety of sizes, designs, and colors. They typically have a reinforced floor for the safety of the pet. They are equipped with ventilation holes and a roll-down mesh window.

Except for night-time and some exceptional circumstances dogs should not spend more than five hours in such carriers, and not very often.

== See also ==
- Pet taxi
