= Dog crate =

Cage for dogs

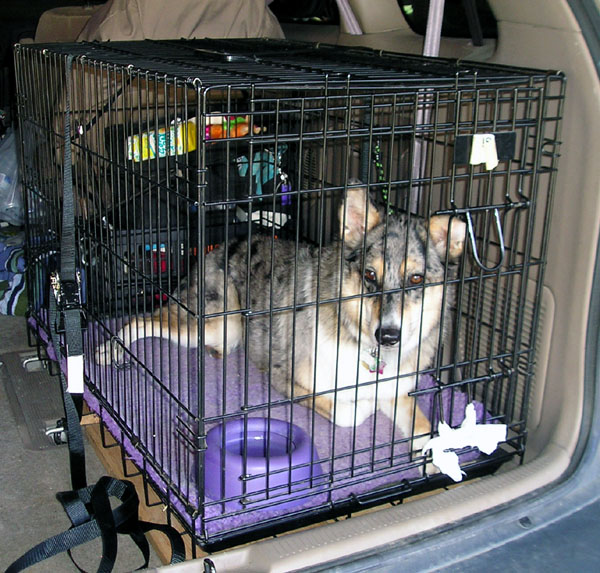
One variety of wire crate

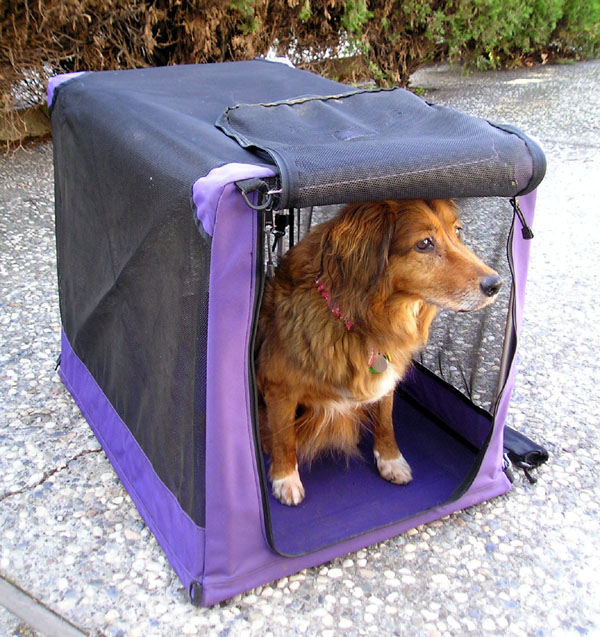
A variety of a soft crate

A dog crate, dog cage, or kennel is a metal, wire, plastic, or fabric enclosure with a door in which a dog may be kept for security or transportation. Dog crates are designed to replicate a dog's natural den and as such can provide them with a place of refuge at home or when traveling to new surroundings. Other common reasons for using a dog crate are for toilet training a new puppy, transporting a dog, limiting access while the dog learns rules, ensuring the dog's safety, confining a dog in locations where dogs cannot safely or legally roam freely, or giving a dog a place to go when visitors come to the house.

Crate training accustoms the dog to the crate so that they can rest in it without stress.

Using a crate for a dog is similar to having a playpen for a toddler or a crib for a baby, and allows the owner to take their eyes off their pet. However, misuse (such as prolonged locking) can cause the dog psychological harm. Along with dog’s crate it is also important that there is proper bed/bedding so that the dogs are comfortable and don’t feel the urge to get out of the crate.

== Types ==
There are many types of dog crates, and variations within the types. Factors to consider when choosing an appropriate crate include cost, durability, portability, safety, and style.

- Solid plastic crates are usually more suitable than other types for secure travel, such as in an airplane. They might also be safer in a car accident than wire crates. Disadvantages are that they take up a lot of space and do not fold for storage.
- Travel Crates are designed specifically for use in vehicles for pet vehicle transportation. These crates are not intended for use on airplanes or for carrying pets outside of vehicles. They also do not make good housebreaking crates.
- Aluminum crates can be either fixed or folding. A few of their advantages are: light weight, very strong when constructed with appropriate bracing, will not rust, excellent airflow and vision for the dogs. Aluminum crates are suitable for use at veterinary hospitals, car travel, as a permanent "den" for your dog inside the home and in breeding kennel environments. Some aluminum crates have solid walls and some have bars. The crates with bars may be more suitable for dogs who need to see out to feel comfortable. Other dogs may prefer the den like feel of the solid wall variety to feel secure.
- Wire crates usually can be folded for storage or transport, although it might be difficult to do and they are fairly heavy for their size. They provide more airflow for the dog and provide people with a clearer view inside and they range in size. Such crates are often used in car travel, at veterinary hospitals, and at kennels. There are a variety of covers and pads available to make crates safe and more comfortable.

Wire crates are also popular at dog shows; they allow the dog to be clearly seen by spectators, and sashes, rosettes, and ribbons won can be hung on the crate for display.

- Hybrid crates are a combination of aluminum, coated steel wire mesh and reinforced plastic. These crates have the durability of traditional aluminum crates and the airflow and clear view of the dog that wire crates offer. Some additional features are rounded edges that prevent injuries to dogs and humans that are common with wire crates and an ergonomic handle, that makes the crate easier to open (especially for those with limited hand mobility, like the elderly and autistic).
- Soft-sided crates (fabric on a metal frame) can be easily folded for storage or transport and are lightweight. They provide the dog with a stronger sense of security but still allow visibility and airflow. They cannot be used with dogs who are likely to dig or chew at the crate, and they are unsuitable for transporting dogs in vehicles.
- Dog tents are an alternative to soft crates. They offer many of the same advantages (and disadvantages) of soft crates but fold down to an even smaller size and are ultra lightweight so that they can be stuffed into tent bags and taken virtually anywhere. They are good enclosures for dog owners who need to pack their soft crates into cramped vehicles or suitcases or for people who hike, camp, or are involved in dog sports. Like soft crates, they are not suitable for dogs who are not housebroken, or for vehicle travel.
- Decorative crates, made of finished wood, rattan, or other custom materials designed to match a home's decor, aren't usually good for transportation and are not good for destructive dogs, but fulfill a need for confinement at home.

== See also ==
- Exercise pen
- Pet carrier
