= Pet passport =

System which allows animals to travel between countries

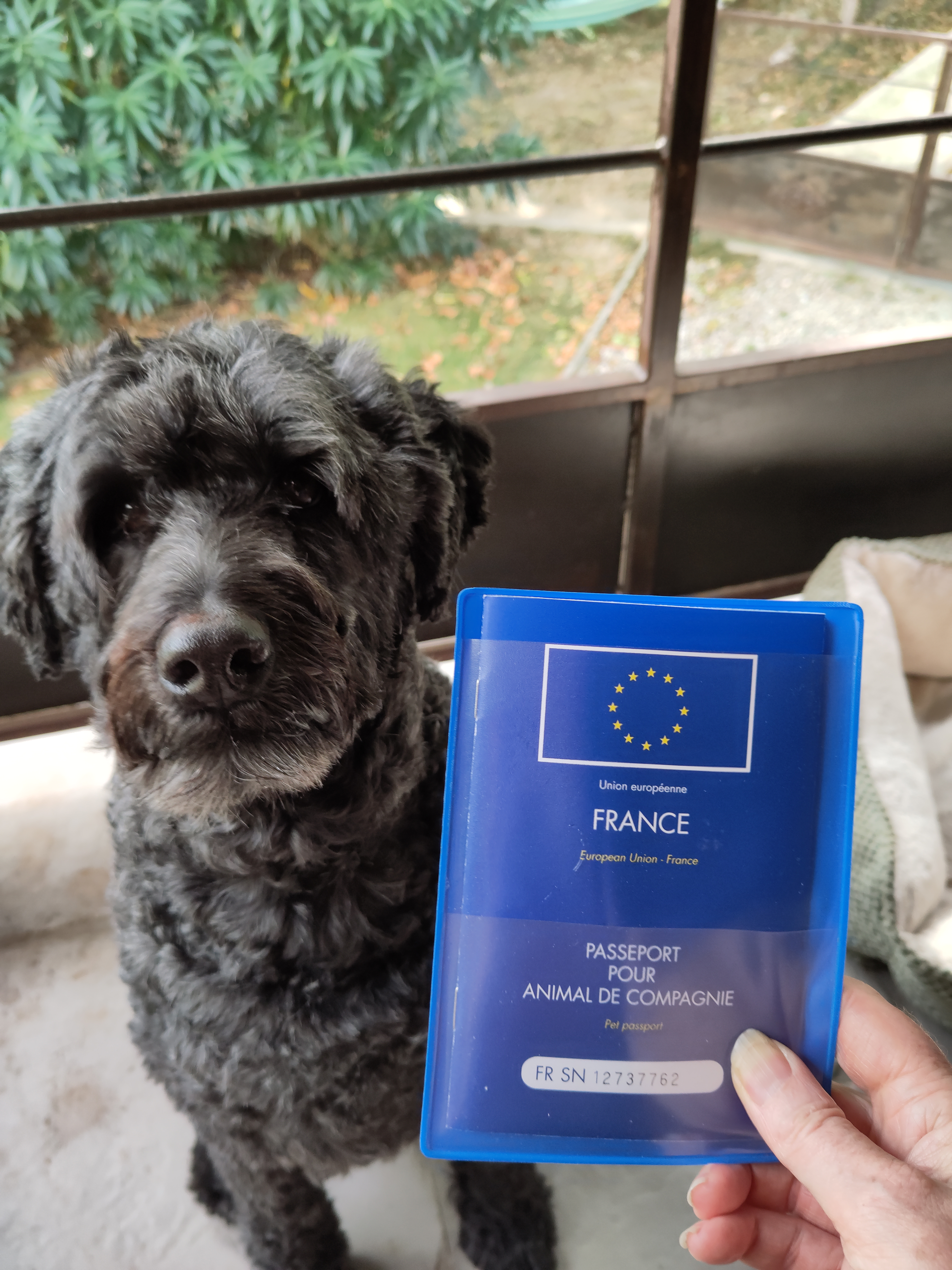
EU pet passport

A pet passport is an official document that records information about a specific animal as part of travel procedures. The effect is to drastically speed up and simplify travel with and transport of animals between member countries, compared to previous procedures if the regulations are followed. The Pet Travel Scheme (PETS) is a system which allows animals to travel easily between member countries of the European Union without undergoing quarantine.

== History ==
On 1 October 2001, the European Union introduced the Pet Travel Scheme (PETS), under which animals from any member country may freely travel to any other member country on approved carriers.

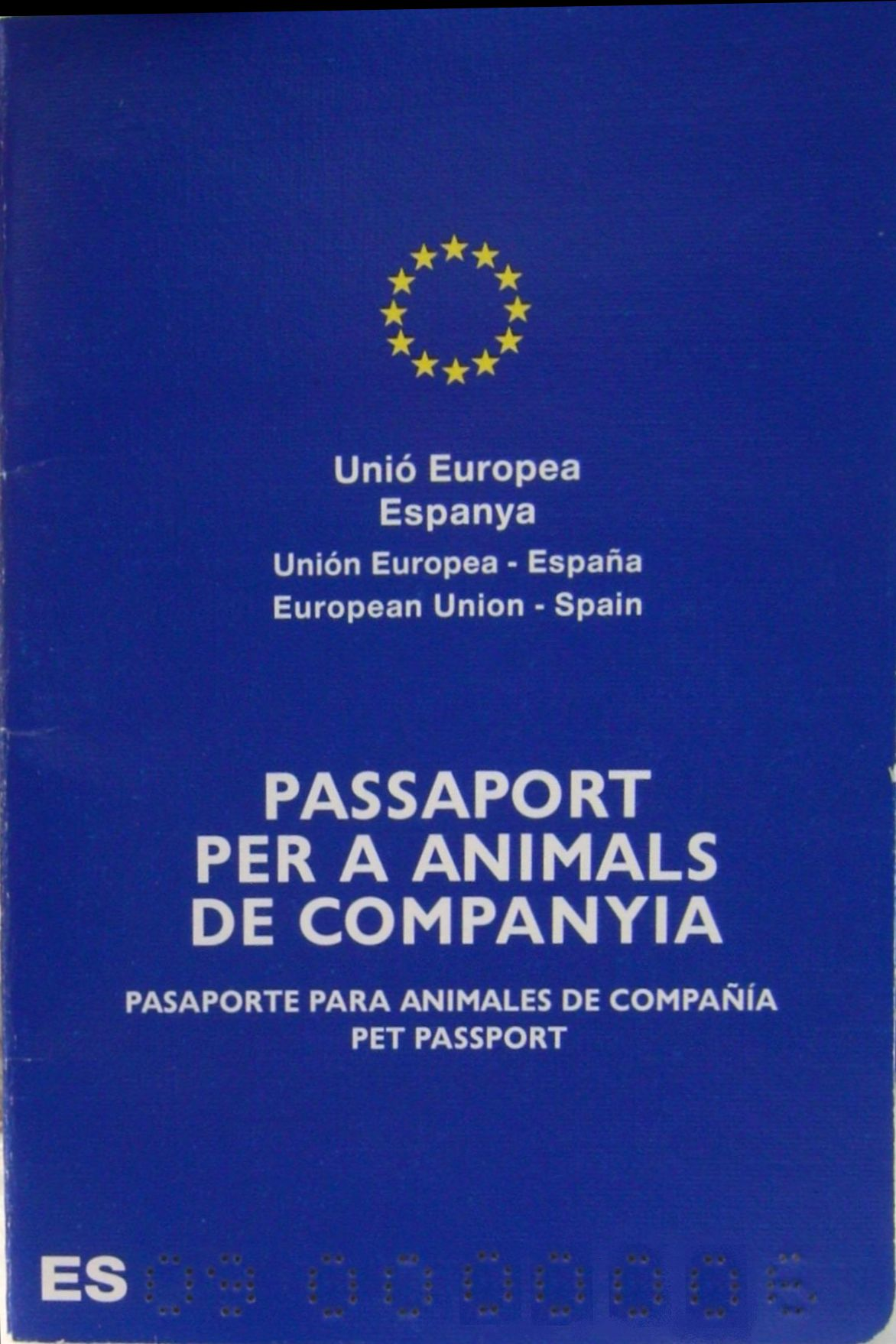
An EU pet passport issued by the government of Catalonia, Spain

In December 2014, EU regulation 576/2013 went into effect, standardising the rules for the transport of pets within the EU. This includes the requirement to present identification for the pet. The rules governing the identification documents are standardised under EU regulation 577/2013. Pet passports issued prior to 2014 retain their validity.

Over time the EU scheme has recognised other countries, such as Australia, Canada, New Zealand and the United States, and relaxed some of the entry requirements for pets travelling from these countries.

== Appearance ==
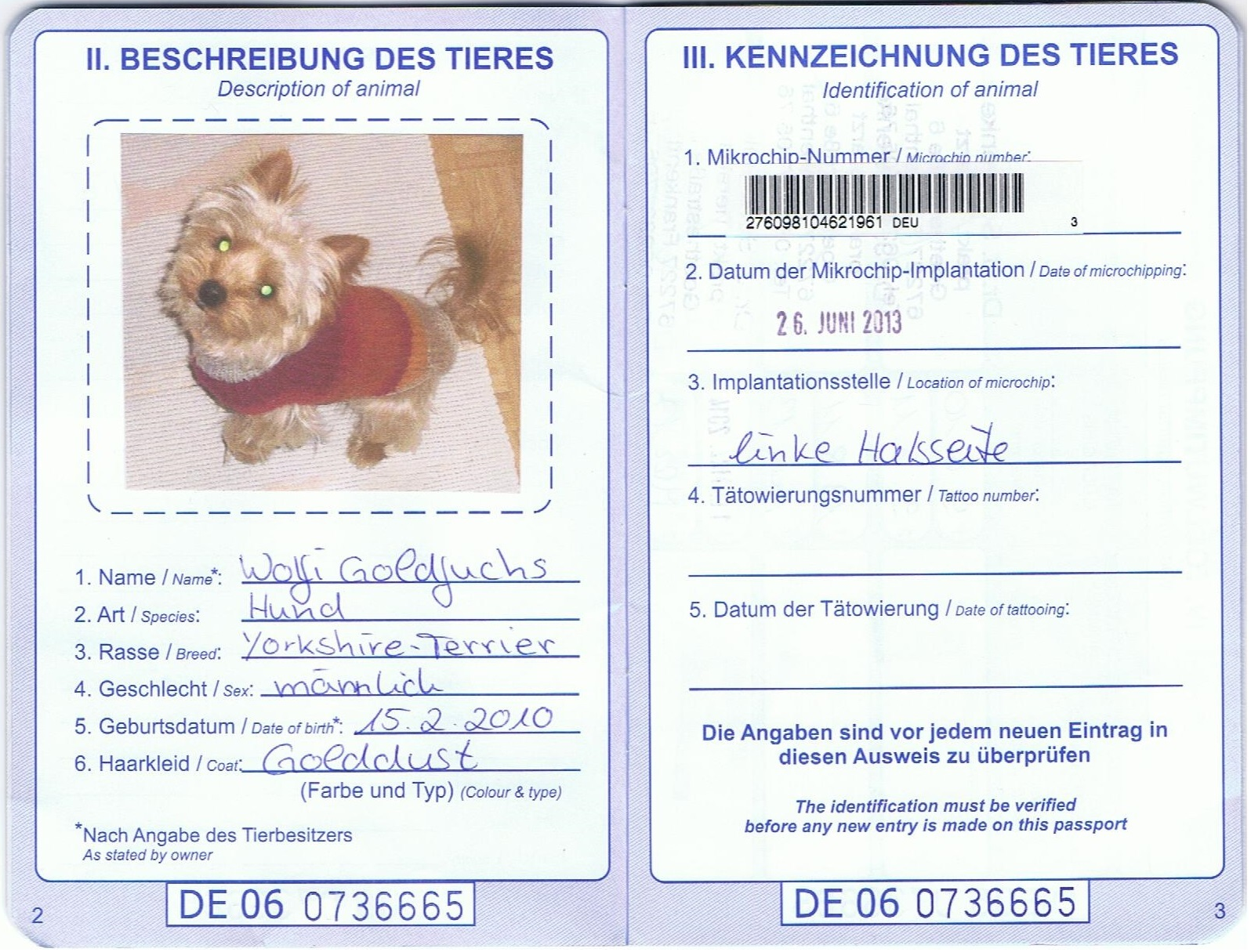
A German-issued EU pet passport

The pet passport itself comes in multiple forms, sometimes a pink A4 sheet, sometimes a small blue booklet. It contains the microchip or tattoo number of the animal, the certification that the animal has had a rabies vaccination, and needs to be signed by an officially approved veterinarian.

A new style passport with laminated strips and additional security measures was introduced in the UK in December 2014. Old style passports remain valid, although passports issued in the UK ceased to be valid after the end of the Brexit transition period.

The passport is not to be confused with the folder routinely issued by vets, which records the complete vaccination history of the pet.

== Procedure ==
Every country has different requirements, both for export and import of animals, although some features are common to all.

=== Requirements ===
- Subcutaneous (below the skin) microchip implant that meets the International Society of Pharmacovigilance (ISoP) specification
- Certified rabies vaccination and results from a blood serum test to confirm the presence of rabies antibodies. For pet travel in Europe, the rabies vaccine should be administered by a veterinarian a minimum of 21 days before travel. Some countries may differ.
- Proof of treatment for ticks, fleas and tapeworms
- Veterinarian's letter or certificate confirming fitness to travel and/or no obvious signs of disease
- Government certification that the veterinarian's export documentation and certificates are in order for travel

In some countries, the formal passport is needed. Others will accept documentation in any form so long as it provides clear evidence of the procedure being followed. Usually, the animal and its papers are checked thoroughly upon both departure and arrival.

A pet passport alone can be used to enter some countries if it records all relevant information (e.g., the UK), but it will not suffice to enter many countries. For instance Guatemala requires that all imported pets have a rabies vaccination, but will not accept the pet passport as proof of said vaccination. They require proof of the rabies vaccination in the animal's records.

Tapeworm treatment, for those countries that require it (for dogs only), must be administered by a vet not less than 24 hours and not more than 120 hours (1–5 days) before scheduled arrival time.

=== Specific country regulations ===
==== United Kingdom ====
The UK Government website sets out the rules for bringing pets into the UK. Dogs, cats and ferrets with Pet Passports from EU (and some other) countries can enter the UK via specified routes and ferry companies, including the Channel Tunnel by car. Before entering the UK, most pet dogs (including assistance dogs), but not cats or ferrets, must be treated for tapeworm. The treatment must be administered by a vet not less than 24 hours and not more than 120 hours (1–5 days) before its scheduled arrival time in the UK. (There is no mandatory requirement for tick treatment.) No treatment is required for dogs entering the UK from Finland, Ireland, Norway or Malta. All animals (except guide dogs) travelling by air to the UK must travel in the hold as manifest cargo and can only use specific airports and airlines. (Similar rules apply to pets arriving by sea, other than by specific ferry services.) British law precludes all animals entering the UK by air either in the cabin or in the hold as excess or checked baggage. Most airlines do not offer cargo services to individual passengers directly and specialist agents are normally used. UK law does not prohibit the transport of dogs and cats in the cabin or as hold baggage when departing from the UK, but restrictions may be imposed by individual airlines or destination countries. Swiss International Air Lines publishes a guide which is typical of the services provided by several European airlines.

==== Japan ====
To bring pets into Japan from member states there are several separate procedures that must be followed. These do not cover Iceland, Australia, New Zealand, Fiji, Hawaii and Guam, which have designated (rabies-free) region status. If a pet is taken out of Japan, it may take between six months to a year for it to re-enter. Including prior contact with Japanese Quarantine several months before entry:

- The dog or cat must be microchipped.
- The dog or cat must have stayed in the country for at least 180 days (6 months) since its birth or having left Japan.
- The dog or cat must have had 2 rabies injections and a blood test 6 month before entering/re-entering Japan, proving the pet is free of rabies. This test must be carried out at a designated laboratory.
- The dog or cat does not have or show signs of rabies or leptospirosis (dogs only).

To take a dog or cat out of Japan, on top of the necessary injections and microchip, travellers must:

- Have certificates issued by an official vet to prove that their pet has been vaccinated, microchipped and dewormed as necessary. These are vets designated by the prefecture as able to issue certificates and officially vaccinate pets.
- More than a week before travelling, the Animal Quarantine Service must be notified at the port of departure, and an export inspection for the pet applied for. Inspections are carried out by the Quarantine Office (Japanese: ken'eki-kyoku) before the pet is checked in.

== Other information ==
The PETS scheme is not yet standardised, which can lead to much confusion. Every journey between any two countries may differ in requirements for the animal to be accepted upon arrival at the departure point.

- The major delay in obtaining a pet passport is the time required for the rabies vaccination to become valid. The implications are:
  1. An animal may get a valid rabies vaccination and serology check, and then apply for a passport on the spot, at a later date.
  2. An animal whose rabies vaccination is allowed to go out of date (typically 1–2 years) by even one day, without a booster, must start with a new vaccination and delay.
- Because PETS is European wide, regulations may differ for travel within and outside Europe. Requirements for travel to a destination may be quite different from the requirements upon returning, because they are determined by the country being entered.
- A suitable and carrier-approved travel crate may be required, which must have the correct food and water containers as set out by the relevant bodies
- Animals should not be sedated for air travel since altitude can affect medications. Most airlines will not accept tranquilised animals. Instead, they are kept in a dark, heated, pressurised hold, which encourages them to sleep for the duration of travel.
- Larger animals may be restricted to airline routes which can accommodate their crates. Not all airlines will carry animals, and charges vary widely.
- Some routes will not fly animals if the temperature is adverse
- On some airlines, animals may travel as excess baggage or cargo. Excess baggage (in effect treating the crate and animal as another suitcase) ensures they travel on the same flight and is often much cheaper.
- The UK restricts incoming flights to ship animals as cargo. A cheaper alternative is to fly to another European city, such as Paris or Amsterdam, and then travel to the UK by rail or ferry instead, which do not have this restriction. Passengers travelling with animals by rail or ferry to or from the UK must in many cases have access to a vehicle, as animals cannot be taken directly on foot by Eurostar, nor on most ferry routes. After arriving in Europe from a non-EU participating country, the certificate received from customs or quarantine is valid for Europe-wide travel for up to 4 months.

== See also ==
- Pet travel

== Bibliography ==
- Statutory Instrument 2004 No. 2364: The Rabies (Importation of Dogs, Cats and Other Mammals) (England) (Amendment) Order 2004. Office of Public Sector Information. 17 September 2004. ISBN 978-0-11-049813-3.
