= Transportation of animals =

Intentional movement of animals by transport

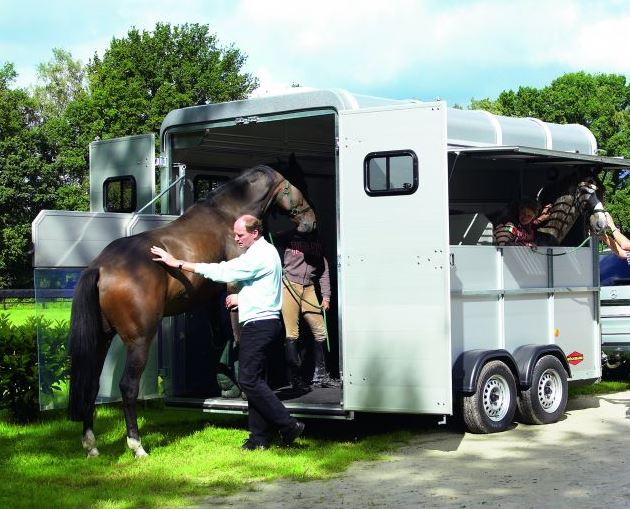
A horse being led into a horse trailer

The transportation of animals is the intentional movement of non-human animals by transport. Common categories of animals which are transported include livestock destined for sale or slaughter; zoological specimens; laboratory animals; race horses; pets; and wild animals being rescued or relocated. Methods of transporting animals vary greatly from species to species.

== History ==
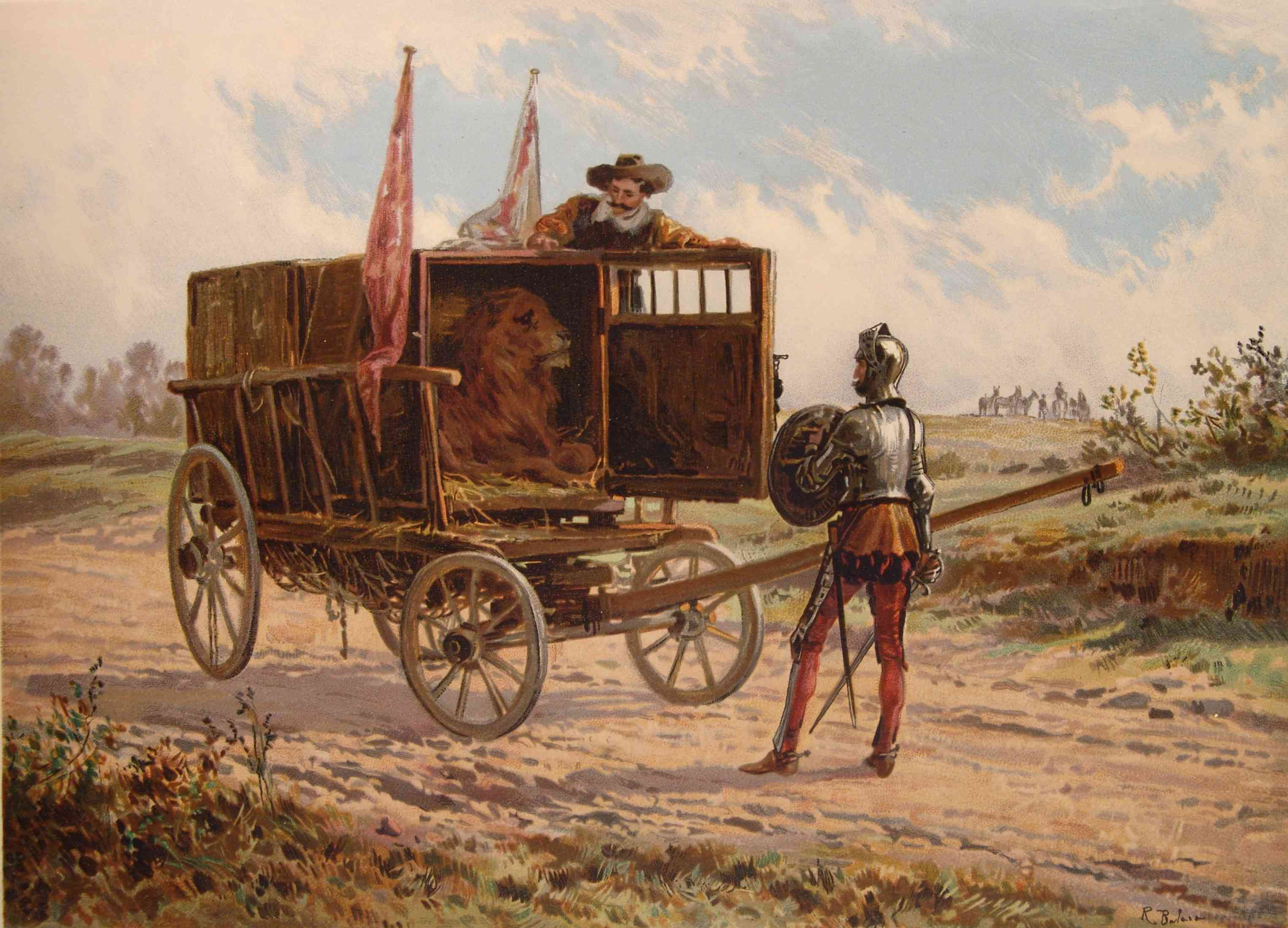
A painting by Ricardo Balaca of the fictional Don Quixote transporting a lion

Humans have been transporting animals for a variety of purposes for thousands of years, with numerous accounts of animals transportation from the ancient world. Animals were transported for Roman circuses and for use as military animals. Two well-known historical examples of animals transported to foreign countries are Hanno the elephant and Dürer's Rhinoceros.

Later, animals were transported from the New World to Europe for study and introduction.

During the 20th century, the transportation of animals has focussed on the movement of animals for food, research, entertainment and conservation and the transport of animals is regulated in many countries. Such transport is regulated by a guideline by the European Council enacted in 2007, with relevant legislation passed in member countries, including England, through the Welfare of Animals (Transport), Order 2006 ("WATEO 2006"); and "equivalent national legislation in Scotland, Wales and Northern Ireland". The Animal Transportation Association was formed in 1976 by interested parties to develop best practices and provide information to those involved in the shipment of animals.

In June 2020, the European Parliament has voted to establish an inquiry committee to investigate the transport of live animals across and out of the European Union. The committee delivered a report in December 2021.

== Livestock ==
Livestock destined for sale or slaughter, race horses, and pets are frequently transported. It is important to avoid injury and death of the animal during transportation.

== Research animals ==
The Institute for Laboratory Animal Research of the United States National Research Council has produced guidelines for the transportation of research animals.

== Zoo animals ==
Wild animals are often transported for display in zoos. Some wild animals offer specific challenges.

=== Elephants ===
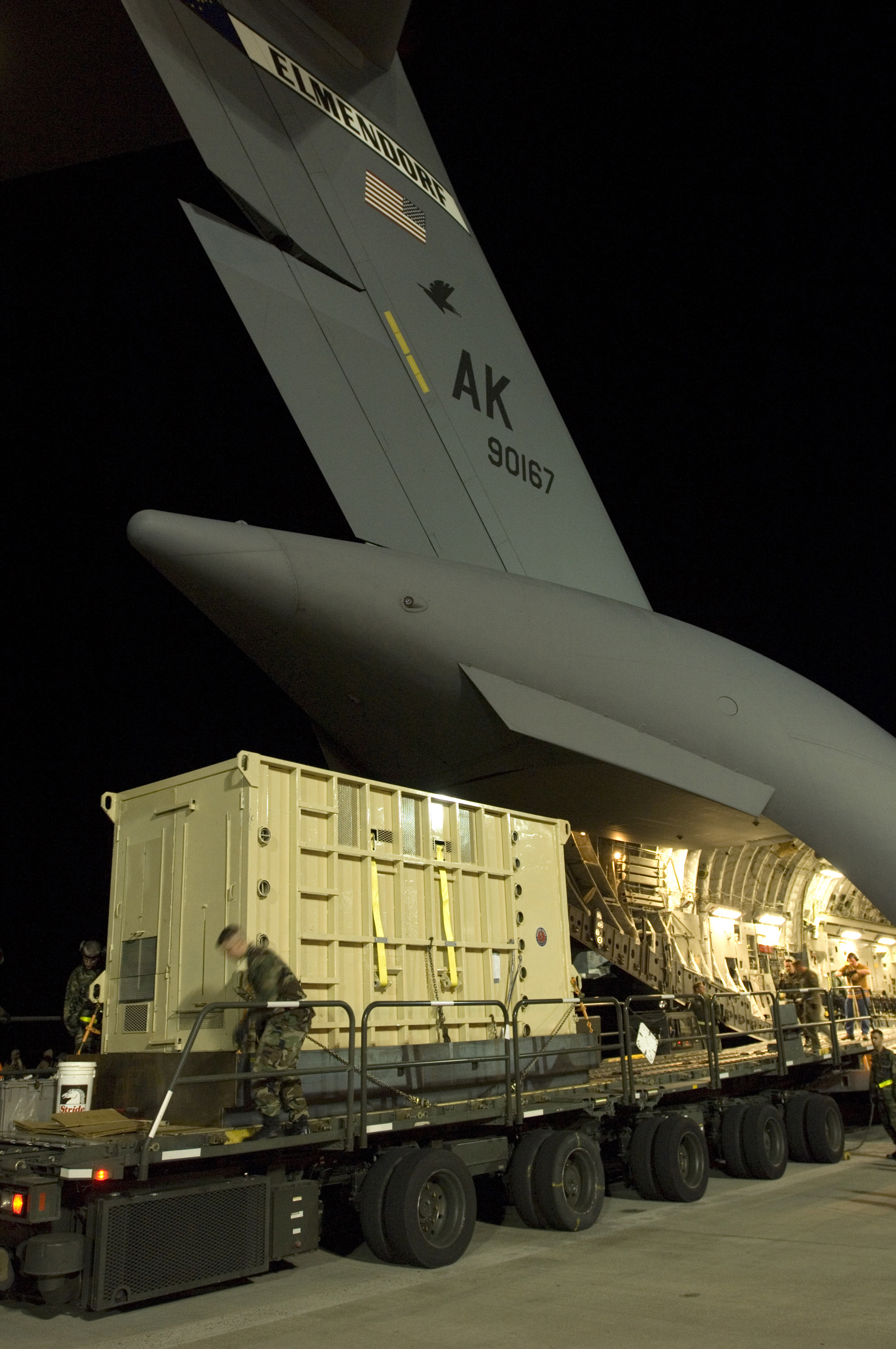
An elephant being transported by air in a custom-built crate.

Elephants are regularly transported for circuses and as working animals but are less regularly transported between zoos. Historically, war elephants were transported from their native countries to battlefields throughout the ancient world. Ptolemy II Philadelphus, in the 3rd century BCE, had ships custom-built for the purpose.

Elephants employed by circuses were historically transported in Circus trains.

In modern times, the transportation of elephants has often been contentious. In 2013, the CEO of Toronto Zoo stated that "whatever the mode of transport is, ground, air, rail, there are associated risks with moving elephants". The zoo had been unable to finalise a determination about the mode of transport for three elephants to a sanctuary in California. Another Toronto Zoo board member noted that if an elephant panics during air transport, "it may have to be euthanized".

=== Giraffes ===
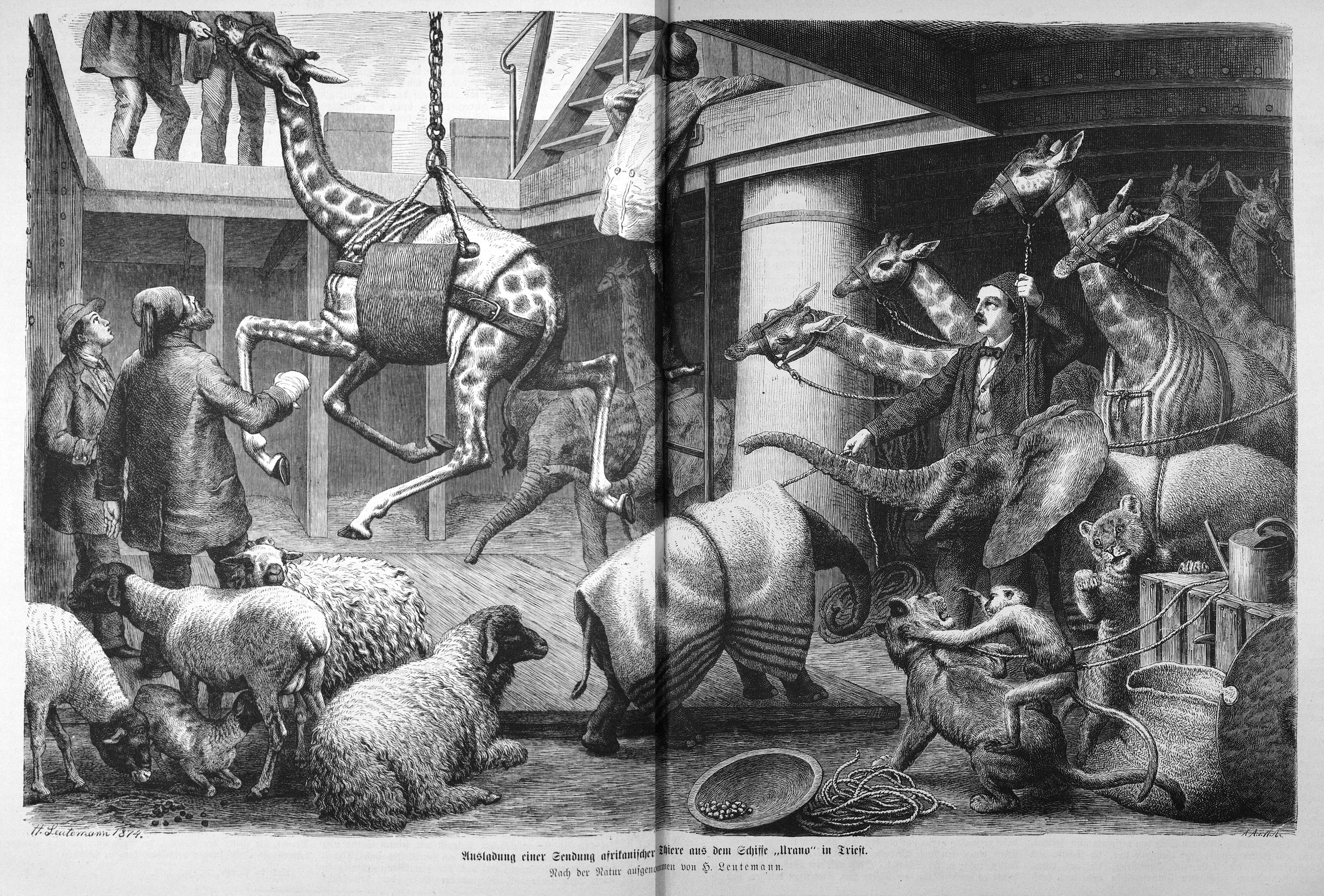
An illustration of giraffes being transported, 1874

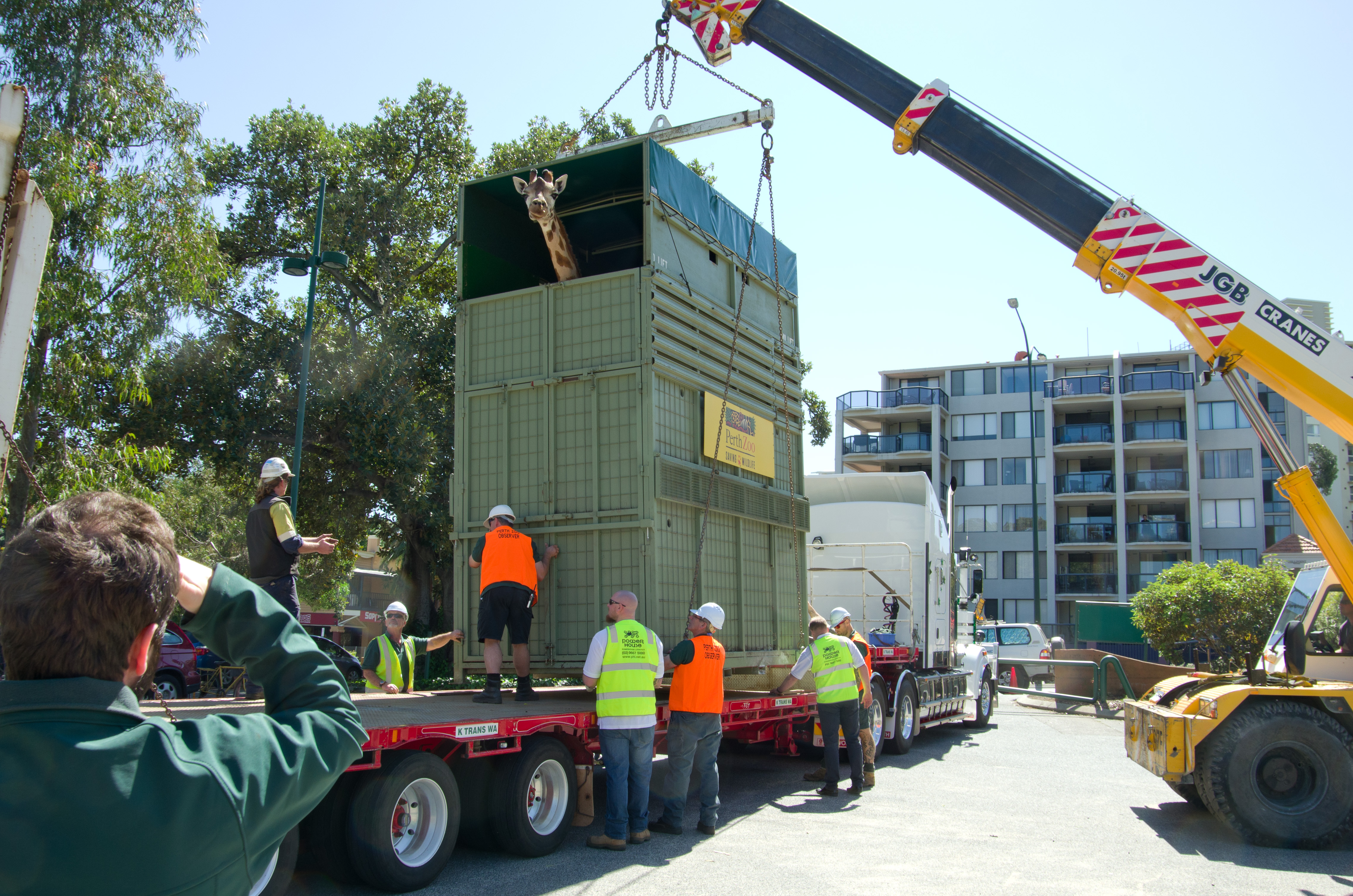
Asali the giraffe in her 4.4 crate being loaded for transportation from Perth Zoo to Monarto Safari Park, a journey of 2200km

Giraffes are typically transported in custom-built containers or crates to account for their height.

In 2013, Nakuru, a 15-month-old female giraffe, was transported from New Zealand to Melbourne in Australia. Her specialised 4.2 metre crate was transported by sea on a cargo ship. As is required by Australian law, Nakaru was quarantined for 30 days at the Werribee Open Range Zoo before being moved again by truck to Melbourne Zoo approximately 30 kilometres away.

Earlier in 2013, Tonda, a 4.3-metre, three-year-old adult male, was moved from Paignton Zoo to Chessington Zoo, both in England. The 322-kilometre move was completed by a Dutch company that specialises in animal transportation using a specially built trailer with an adjustable roof.

=== Lions ===
Lions present particular transportation challenges because of their size and the danger they pose to humans. To transport two lions from Morocco to Germany, one specialist animal transportation company elected to move the animals by land, travelling via Gibraltar, Spain and France, rather than by air. The vehicle they used was extensively modified with new suspension and shock absorbers.

In 2013, a South African zoologist received media attention for having transported 27 lions, mostly adult, in his Mercedes-Benz Sprinter van to relocate them from one wildlife park to another.

=== Tapirs ===
Though they are related to the horse and rhinoceros, tapirs are regulated as pachyderms by the United States Department of Agriculture for the purpose of transportation and import. One issue with the transporting of tapirs is that young tapirs must not be separated from their mother for the first year of their lives – and as tapirs must be separated from other tapirs in order to transport them, it can be very difficult to transport a young or baby tapir.

In 2008, a three-year-old tapir, Romeo, was transported from Costa Rica to Nashville, Tennessee. Romeo was the first animal to leave the country legally and the first tapir to be transported to the United States in more than 20 years. A specially-constructed cage was used to transport the tapir on a cargo plane and the move itself was supervised by staff from the Nashville Zoo.

In 2013, Timmy, a 400-pound Baird's tapir who had suffered from ear infections, was sent by FedEx from Florida to Los Angeles as part of a breeding programme. He was kept in quarantine for 30 days after his trip.

== Aquarium animals ==
There are two techniques for moving large marine mammals – wet transit, in which the animal is kept in a large tank of water, and dry transit, in which the animal is placed in a padded sling and kept calm, wet, and cool by human assistance. The decision whether to use wet or dry transit will depend on the size of the animal being transported and the distance to be traveled.

=== Killer whales ===
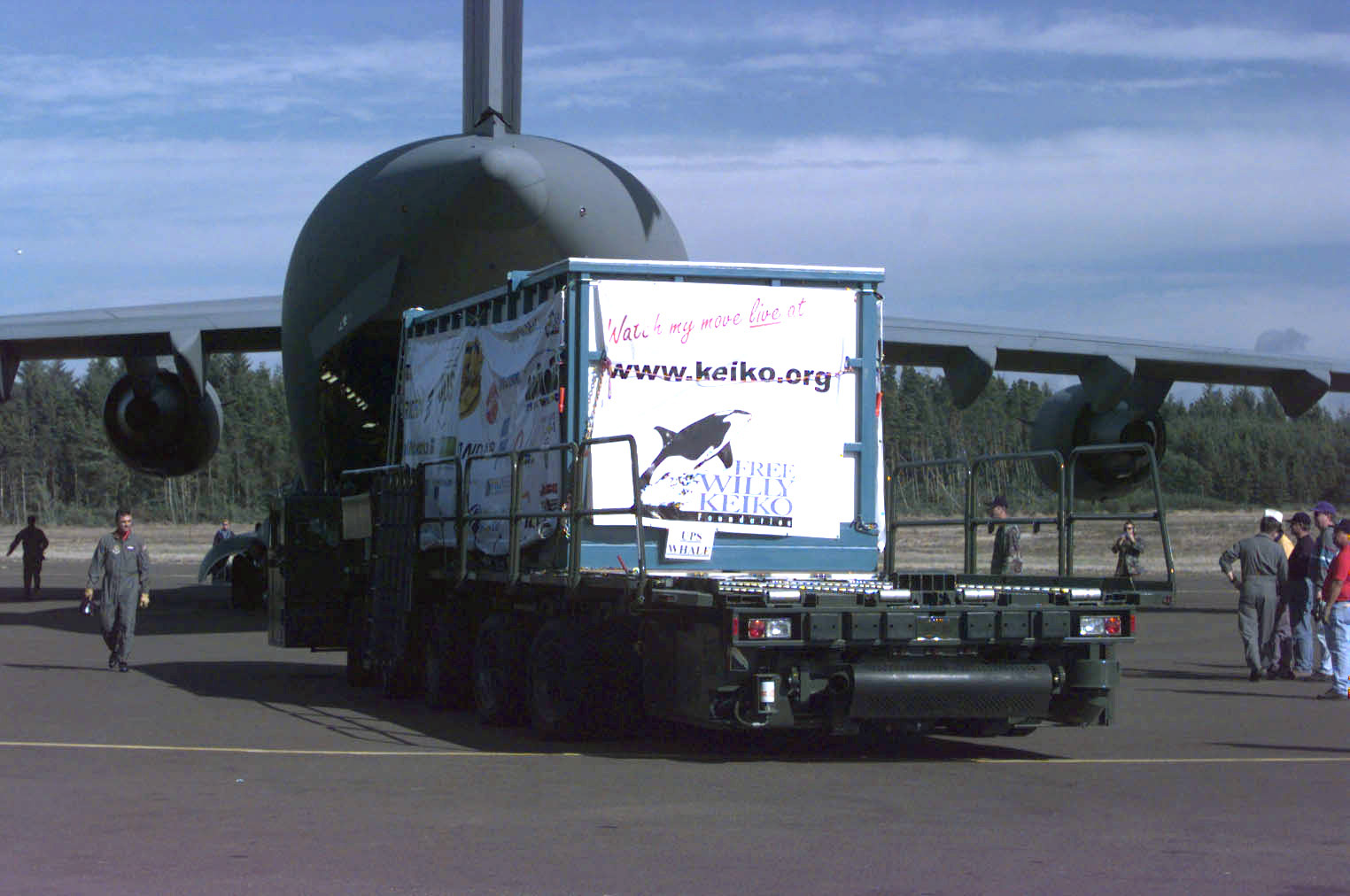
The killer whale Keiko being transported on a Boeing C-17 Globemaster III

The transportation of killer whales (orca) was a key feature of the popular film Free Willy. Keiko, who played the role of Willy in the film, was moved using a trailer – although when he was actually transported to the Oregon Coast Aquarium, he was airlifted by the United Parcel Service. When he was transported to the Westman Islands in Iceland in 1998, he was loaded onto a United States Air Force C-17 transport.

=== Other whales ===
The largest animal ever transported was J.J., a young gray whale who weighed 19,200 lb (8,700 kg) and was 31 feet (9.4 m) long. She was fitted into a custom-made transport sling and lifted by crane onto a 40-foot foam-padded trailer, before being released, again by crane, just off Point Loma. FedEx has shipped at least seven whales to aquariums in slings inside of metal containers containing just enough water to keep the whales moist.

=== Seals ===
Transporting seals is considered to be easier than transporting cetaceans, since seals are semiaquatic and able to tolerate long periods out of water, as long as they are kept cool and moist. Cooling of the transported seal can be carried out by using a water spray, or placing ice above the seal's container which cools the seal as it melts.

== Transportation of domestic pets ==
=== By air ===
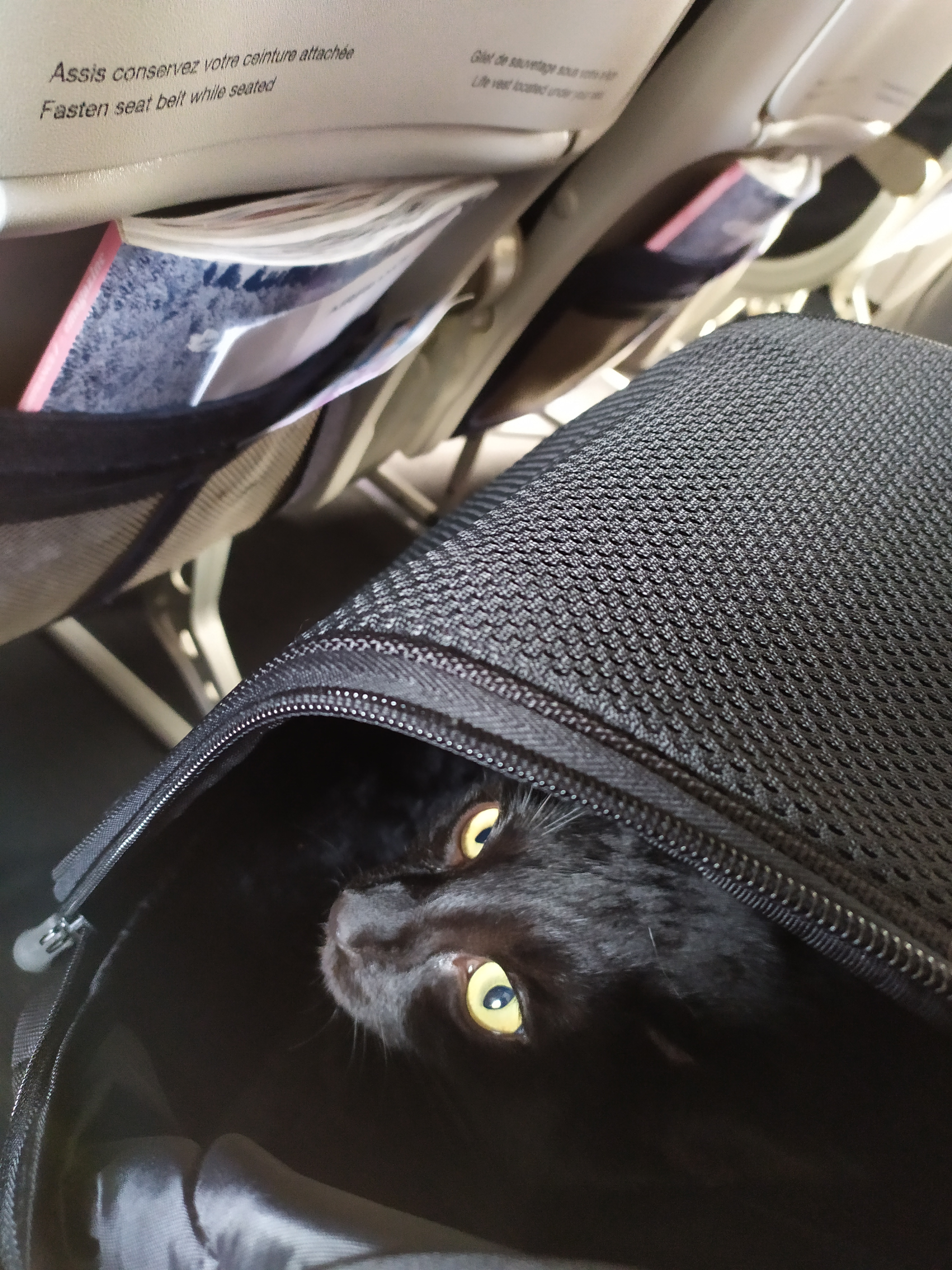
Cat traveling in the passenger cabin of an Air France aircraft

Airline policies on the transport of domestic pets vary, with a small number permitting pets in passenger cabins, some more allowing them in the hold, and many declining to carry them at all. The American Ferret Association, for example, offers advice on the policies of nineteen different carriers.

Specialist animal air transportation companies exist and will arrange whole-aircraft charters for larger and outsize animal transportation projects, utilizing flying veterinarians to ensure the safety and comfort of the animal passengers. These companies often arrange aircraft for large-scale zoo relocation projects, transporting multiple exotic animals.

==== Controversies ====
In 2018, United Airlines admitted to forcing a passenger pet to be stowed away in an overhead bin, resulting in the animal's death. Only two days later, another dog aboard a United flight was mistakenly sent to Japan instead of its intended Kansas City destination.

A similar incident occurred in March 2018 when Delta Air Lines sent a puppy to Salt Lake City instead of its intended Boise destination.

=== Passports ===
In 2004 a change in EU law meant that as well as cats and dogs, ferret transportation was allowed within European Union borders.

Currently the EU pet passport scheme only covers cats, dogs and ferrets that have been vaccinated against rabies and fitted with electronic microchips. As of yet, there is no EU wide legislation to cover transportation of other pets, with different member states applying various rules.

== See also ==
- Animal transporter
- European Convention for the Protection of Animals during International Transport (1968, revised 2003)
- Laika, the Soviet space dog who became the first animal to orbit Earth.
- Pet taxi
