= Consolidated rental car facility =

Airport facility hosting rental car companies

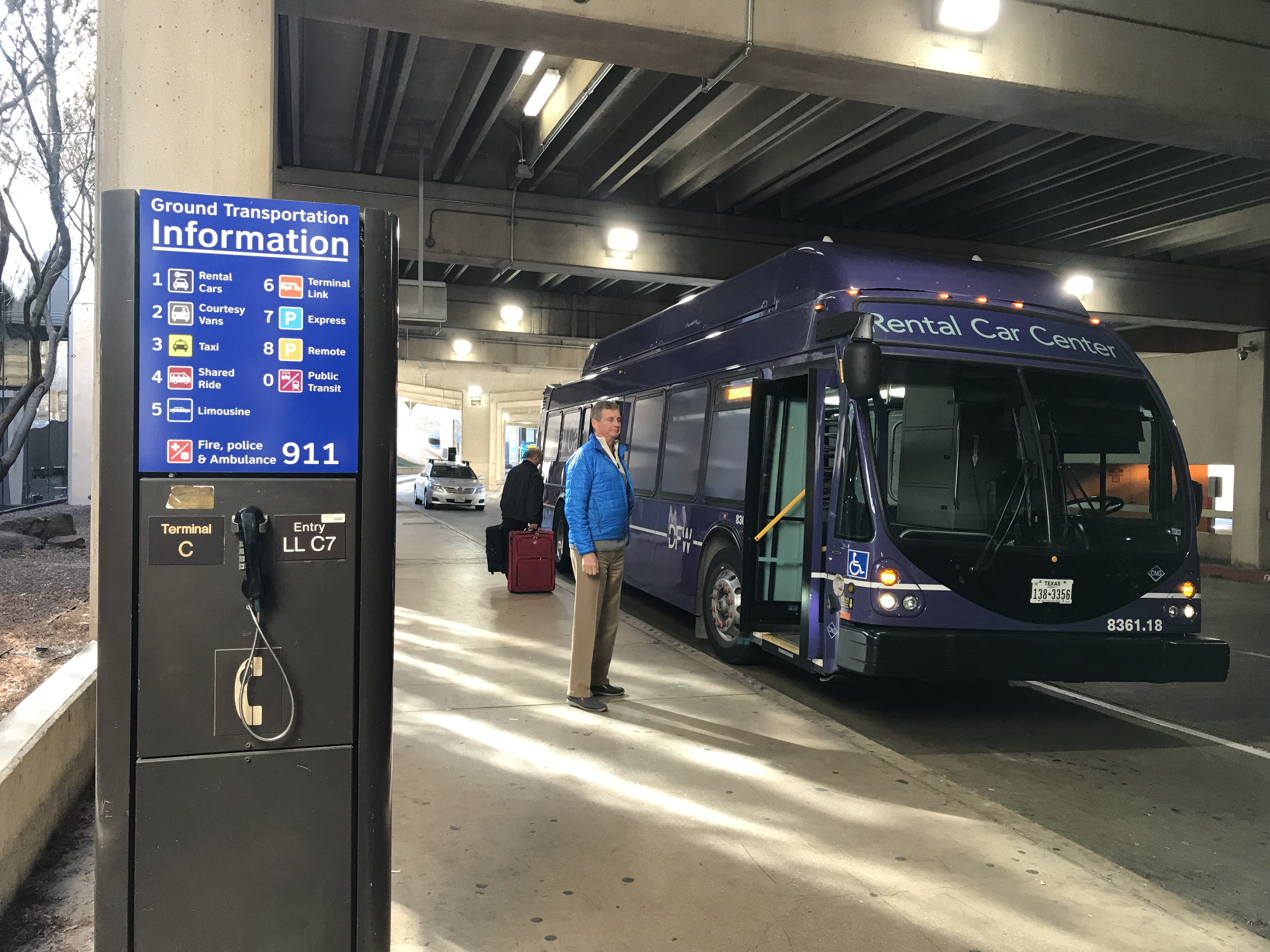
These facilities are located away from the terminal buildings, and are often accessed using shuttle buses like this one seen at Dallas/Fort Worth International Airport, Texas.

A consolidated rental car facility (CRCF) or consolidated rental car center (CONRAC) is a complex that hosts numerous car rental agencies, typically found at airports in the United States.

The most important incentives for building consolidated facilities are greatly reduced traffic congestion in airport pick up and drop off areas and increased convenience for travelers. A single unified fleet of shuttle buses can serve all car rental agencies, instead of each company operating their own individual shuttle buses which may come less frequently. Congestion can be further reduced by connecting the consolidated facility to the airport terminal with a people mover.

Consolidated facilities are typically built around two areas: a customer service building where each company operates retail counters to serve renters, and a "ready/return" lot or garage where cars are temporarily parked while ready and awaiting a renter, or when recently returned and in need of servicing before the next rental.

Facilities usually also feature a Quick Turn Around (QTA) area either on-site or at a nearby location, where light maintenance of vehicles can be conducted including cleaning, fueling, and inspection of engine fluids. There can be several QTA areas operated by the different companies, or the services can be shared.

The first known consolidated facility was built at Sacramento International Airport in 1994. However, as early as 1974, four companies were already sharing facilities and shuttle buses at Dallas/Fort Worth Airport, and in 1988 companies at Minneapolis–Saint Paul airport introduced common shuttle buses. These differed from modern CONRACs in that the majority of rental car companies at Dallas/Fort Worth continued to operate their own off-site facilities and shuttle buses, while at Minneapolis, only the shuttle buses and not the facilities themselves were shared (in other words, a single shuttle bus line served multiple off-site rental car companies).

Furthermore, the rental car industry has seen major mergers, creating three major holding companies that now represent ten brands commonly seen at airports, the Avis Budget Group (which operates Avis Car Rental, Budget Rent a Car, Payless Car Rental and Zipcar), Enterprise Holdings (which operates Enterprise Rent-A-Car, Alamo Rent a Car and National Car Rental) and The Hertz Corporation (which operates Hertz Rent A Car, Dollar Rent A Car and Thrifty Car Rental). Because of these mergers, even in cities without a consolidated facility, many of these companies have consolidated all their brands into one location.

== Locations ==
Locale	Airport	Year	Notes
Sacramento, CA	Sacramento International Airport	1994	First facility in the U.S.
Cedar Rapids, IA	Eastern Iowa Airport	1996	Opened New Joint Use Rental Car Facility in 1996
Minneapolis–Saint Paul	Minneapolis–Saint Paul International Airport	1998	Had been operating common shuttle buses since 1988.
Cleveland, OH	Cleveland Hopkins International Airport	1998	
San Francisco, CA	San Francisco International Airport	1998	Connected to AirTrain APM (automated people mover) system. Expanded in June 2008
Ontario, CA	Ontario International Airport (ONT)	1999	
Dallas–Ft. Worth, TX	Dallas Fort Worth International Airport	2000	In 1990, DFW had two rental car sites on the north and south sides of the airport. Both hosted Avis, Budget, Hertz and National. A new facility that consolidated more brands opened south of the airport in March 2000
Albuquerque, NM	Albuquerque International Sunport	2001	
Baltimore, MD–Washington, DC	Baltimore/Washington International Airport	2003	
Houston, TX	George Bush Intercontinental Airport	2003	
Oakland, CA	Oakland International Airport	2003	
Ft. Lauderdale, FL	Fort Lauderdale–Hollywood International Airport	2005	At its opening, this was the largest facility in the US.
Phoenix, AZ	Phoenix Sky Harbor International Airport	2006	Connected to PHX Sky Train APM.
Las Vegas, NV	Harry Reid International Airport	2007	
Kansas City, MO	Kansas City International Airport	2007	
Anchorage, AK	Ted Stevens Anchorage International Airport	2007	
Spokane, WA	Spokane International Airport	2008	
Atlanta, GA	Hartsfield–Jackson Atlanta International Airport	2009	Connected to ATL SkyTrain APM.
Fresno, CA	Fresno Yosemite International Airport	2009	
Miami, FL	Miami International Airport	2010	Connected to MIA Mover APM. Part of the Miami Intermodal Center
San Jose, CA	San Jose International Airport	2010	
Nashville, TN	Nashville International Airport	2011	
Memphis, TN	Memphis International Airport	2012	
Seattle, WA	Seattle–Tacoma International Airport	2012	At opening, largest facility in the US to win LEED Silver certification.
New Orleans, LA	Louis Armstrong New Orleans International Airport	2012	
Chicago, IL	Midway International Airport	2013	
Boston, MA	Logan International Airport	2013	
Newark, NJ/New York City	Newark Liberty International Airport	2013/2023	Original location closed, with a new one opened in 2023 as part of new Terminal A project. Connected to AirTrain Newark monorail.
Burbank, CA	Hollywood Burbank Airport	2014	Part of the Regional Intermodal Transportation Center.
San Juan, Puerto Rico	Luis Muñoz Marín International Airport	2014	
Moline, IL	Quad Cities International Airport	2014	
Austin, TX	Austin–Bergstrom International Airport	2015	
Charlotte, NC	Charlotte Douglas International Airport	2015	
San Diego, CA	San Diego International Airport	2016	
Oklahoma City, OK	Will Rogers World Airport	2016	
Salt Lake City, UT	Salt Lake City International Airport	2016	
San Antonio, TX	San Antonio International Airport	2018	
Tampa, FL	Tampa International Airport	2018	Connected to SkyConnect APM.
Chicago, IL	O'Hare International Airport	2018	Connected to Airport Transit System APM.
Kahului, HI	Kahului Airport	2019	Connected to CONRAC Tram.
Honolulu, HI	Daniel K. Inouye International Airport	2020	
Palm Springs, CA	Palm Springs International Airport	2020	
Columbus, OH	John Glenn Columbus International Airport	2021	
Cincinnati, OH	Cincinnati/Northern Kentucky International Airport	2021	
Portland, OR	Portland International Airport	2021	
Windsor Locks, CT	Bradley International Airport	2022	
Los Angeles, CA	Los Angeles International Airport (LAX)	2024	The US$1.5 billion building is the largest CONRAC in the world at 6,300,000 square feet (590,000 m^{2}) and hosts up to 21,000 rental vehicles. It connects to the airport's terminals by an under construction people mover.
Punta Gorda, FL	Punta Gorda Airport	2025	
South Bend, IN	South Bend International Airport	2025	
Greer, SC	Greenville-Spartanburg International Airport	2025	
Bentonville, AR	Northwest Arkansas National Airport	2026	
Boise, ID	Boise Airport	2026	

=== Facilities under construction ===
The Reno–Tahoe International Airport is currently building a Rental Car and Ground Transportation Center, scheduled to open in 2028.

The Gerald R. Ford International Airport in Grand Rapids, MI is currently constructing a 4-story ConRAC, scheduled to open in 2026.

Syracuse Hancock International Airport in Syracuse, NY is also currently constructing a ConRAC as part of the airport's ongoing improvement projects.
