= Advantage Rent a Car =

American car rental company

Advantage Rent A Car
- Formerly: $3.99 Car Rentals
- Type: Private
- Industry: Car rental
- Founded: 1963; 63 years ago in San Antonio, Texas, United States
- Founders: Kenneth and Helen Walker
- Headquarters: United States
- Number of locations: 3 (2025)
- Area served: United States
- Parent: Orlando Rentco LLC
- Website: advantage.com

Advantage Rent a Car is a privately held American car rental company headquartered in Orlando, Florida.

The company was founded in 1963 by Kenneth and Helen Walker as "$3.99 Car Rentals" and quickly expanded by purchasing several different car rental companies. In 1984, the various car rental brands were consolidated under the name Advantage Rent a Car. The Walker family sold the company in 2006, and by 2008, it was bankrupt. In 2009, the company was purchased out of bankruptcy court by The Hertz Corporation. Hertz was forced to divest the company in 2012 to secure regulatory approval of its acquisition of the Dollar Thrifty Automotive Group. The company changed hands between several private equity firms before going bankrupt again in May 2020. As of July 2020, the brand has been owned by Orlando Rentco LLC, and now operates just 3 locations.

== Operations ==
Advantage operates from 3 airport locations in Atlanta, Miami, and Nashville and has a fleet of approximately 2,000 cars, ranging from economy cars to SUVs.

The company primarily services the leisure segment of the rental car market.

== History ==
In 1963, a small business owned by Kenneth and Helen Walker called “$3.99 Car Rentals” opened its doors to serve the large military population in San Antonio, Texas. Founded with a fleet of five cars, and initially serving the government traveler, it expanded very quickly over the next 20 years into feeder and leisure markets including local retail and airport markets located throughout the Western United States. During the 1960s and 70s, the company grew through the acquisition of several different franchises. The operation was later consolidated in 1984 under the name "Advantage Rent a Car." As the 1990s progressed, expansion of the Advantage brand continued throughout the U.S. into the Sunbelt states and major leisure airport markets. In 2001, Advantage attained worldwide presence by launching an affiliate partnership program that grew to an international network serving more than 33 countries.

In 2006, following the death of Kenneth Walker, the Walker heirs sold the business to Venture Holding Inc.

=== Bankruptcy and acquisition by Hertz ===
In December 2008, Advantage filed for Chapter 11 bankruptcy protection, and closed about 40% of its U.S. retail locations, citing "a simultaneous drop in leisure travel, with greatly increased costs, and frozen credit markets" (presumably an effect of the 2008 financial crisis). 440 workers, or almost half its workforce, were laid off at the time. Advantage was at that point privately held by disgraced Minnesota auto dealership mogul Denny Hecker (who later served a 10-year prison sentence).

On March 31, 2009, the assets of Advantage were purchased by The Hertz Corporation for $33 million, which outbid Enterprise Rent-a-Car in Minnesota bankruptcy court. The purchase included the Advantage logo and website. Hertz stated its intentions after Enterprise had announced it would acquire the assets. The Advantage website was modified to match (or closely mirror) some design and operational aspects of the Hertz website. By fall 2009, Hertz had rebranded its "Simply Wheelz" economy sub-brand with the acquired Advantage trademark properties, and had largely withdrawn the service.

Hertz described its plans to use Advantage for "... further expansion into the price-oriented travel demographic", "... providing Hertz a second brand to sell to corporate accounts and to market with key travel partners" and "... extending the useful life of vehicles in Hertz's rental fleet for Advantage's fleet needs".

On November 5, 2013, Advantage announced filed for bankruptcy. As of October 25, 2013 "Simply Wheelz" sold 5,295 vehicles through auctions with an average loss of about $1,633 per vehicle, which resulted in a total loss of about $8.6 million.

=== Sale and bankruptcy ===
On August 26, 2012, Hertz announced that it had agreed to sell the US Advantage business to Franchise Services of North America and Macquarie Capital, as a divestiture to receive regulatory approval of Hertz's acquisition of Dollar Thrifty, announced at the same time, and to convert foreign Advantage-branded locations to a new Firefly Car Rental brand. On December 12, 2012, Advantage Rent A Car was acquired by a subsidiary of Macquarie Capital, which was to be merged with Franchise Services of North America, Inc. (TSXV:FSN) immediately after a shareholder vote scheduled for 1Q13. The merger received final TSX regulatory and shareholder approval on May 3, 2013.

In April 2014, Advantage was acquired by its current owner, Catalyst Capital Group Inc., a Canadian investment firm based in Toronto.

On May 26, 2020, the company announced it had filed for bankruptcy for a third time.

In June 2020, the intellectual property associated with Advantage Rent a Car and EZ Rent a Car, as well as its operating concessions in Atlanta, Charlotte, Dallas/Fort Worth, Miami, Nashville, and Tampa were acquired by Orlando Rentco LLC. Sixt acquired ten other former airport locations, on July 1, 2020.

In July 2025, it was reported that four out of the seven locations remaining had permanently closed, in Las Vegas, Orlando, Dallas/Fort Worth and Denver. The company's corporate headquarters in Orlando closed shortly after. Several negative reviews left for the company's remaining locations state that the company is in the process of winding down all operations.
