= Mark Frissora =

American business executive (born 1955)

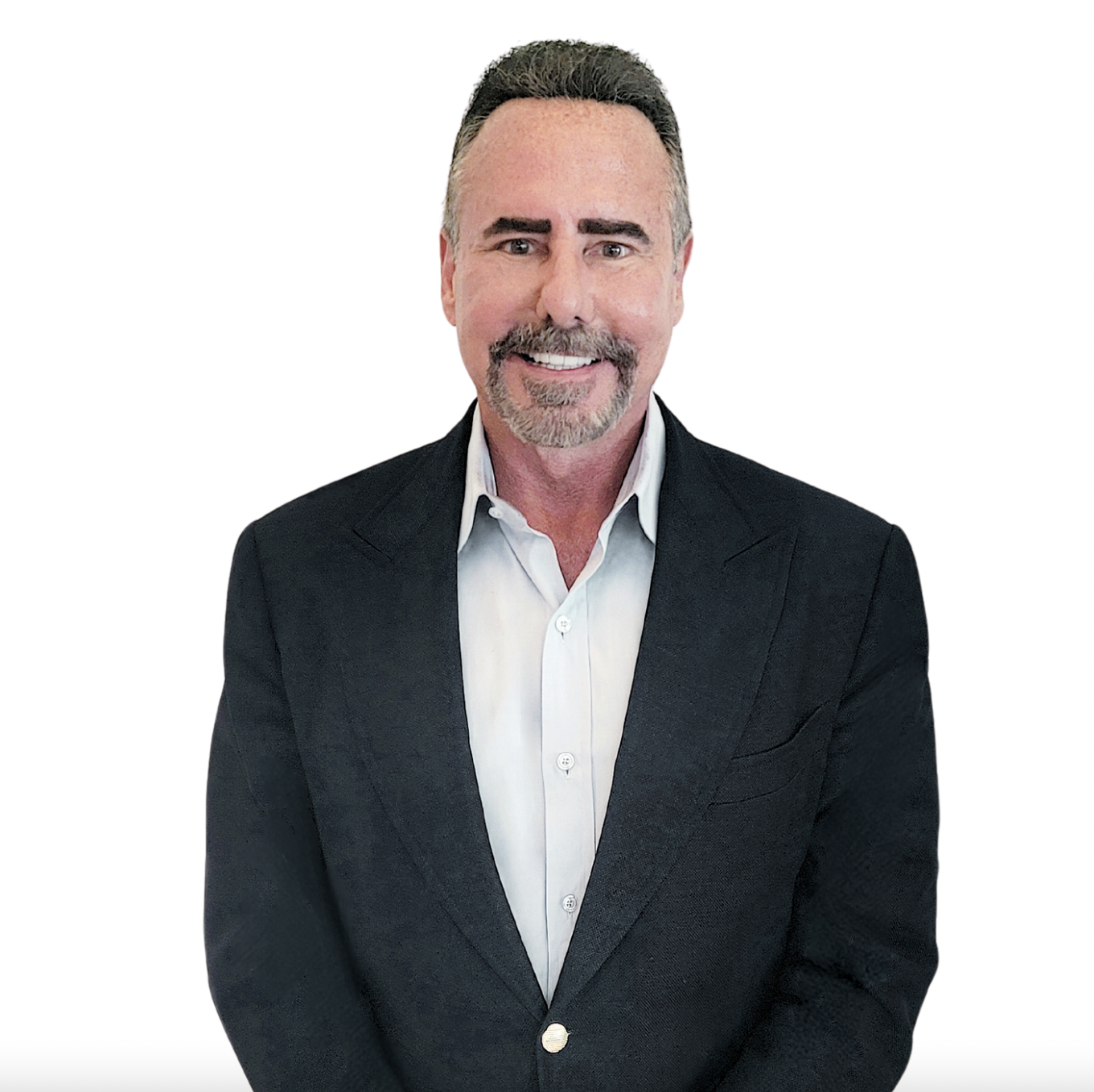
- Frissora in 2025
- Born: Mark Paul Frissora; August 1955 (age 71); Columbus, Ohio, U.S.
- Education: Ohio State University (B.A.)
- Occupations: Business executive and philanthropist
- Years active: 1977–present
- Website: markfrissora.com

Mark Paul Frissora (born August 1955) is an American business executive. He has been the CEO and president of The Hertz Corporation, and was the CEO and president of Caesars Entertainment until 2019.

Prior to his July 2015 appointment as Caesars' CEO, he had spent his career in various management positions at General Electric, Philips Lighting Company and Aeroquip-Vickers, as well as CEO and chairman of Tenneco and Hertz.

Frissora assumed the role of CEO of Tenneco in 2000. Prior to stepping down in 2006, he was attributed to raising Tenneco's revenue by 39 percent for a total of $4.4 billion. Frissora subsequently joined The Hertz Corporation as CEO in 2006. On January 1, 2007, he became company chairman.

Frissora was named by Business Travel News as one of the most "Influential Business Travel Executives" of 2012. While at Hertz, Frissora participated in international business groups including Business Roundtable, the World Economic Forum, McKinsey CEO Advisory Council, and the G100. In 2012, Frissora was presented with the Oliver R. Grace Award for Distinguished Service in Advancing Cancer Research. He stepped down from Hertz in September 2014.

== Early life and education ==
Frissora was born in August 1955 in Columbus, Ohio. He earned a B.A. from Ohio State University and later attended Babson College in Massachusetts. Frissora later enrolled in Thunderbird School of Management in Arizona where he studied executive development.

== Career ==
=== Early management roles (1978–2000) ===
Frissora began his career in 1978 at General Electric. He remained with the company until 1987. Frissora moved to Philips Lighting Company, where he served as Director of Marketing for the Consumer Division in Somerset, New Jersey from November 1988 to January 1991.

He went on to serve as Vice President at Aeroquip-Vickers from 1991 to 1996.

In 1996, Frissora repositioned to Tenneco, where he would again serve in several management positions. His initial role was VP of North American Emissions Control Operations for Walker Manufacturing. Frissora later served as Senior VP and General Manager of Tenneco's worldwide original equipment business from 1998 until March 1999. He was appointed CEO and President of Automotive Operations in April. He joined Tenneco's Board of Directors, of which he was elected chairman, in March of 2000.

=== Growth at Tenneco (2001–2006) ===
As CEO and chairman, Frissora targeted growth markets and sought to diversify revenue streams. By 2004 he had developed revenue boosting strategies in a number of platforms, logistics, customers, markets and product lines at Tenneco. By February 2005, and since 1999, Tenneco's share price had tripled.

=== Appointment to Hertz CEO (2006–2013) ===
In July 2006, Frissora accepted a position as CEO of The Hertz Corporation, a global American-headquartered car rental company, on the eve of the company's initial public offering (IPO). In January 2007, Frissora was subsequently appointed chairman. He oversaw the company through a number of transitions.

Frissora oversaw the acquisition of Donlen Corporation, a fleet leasing company, in 2011.

Other developments during Frissora's tenure included engineering Hertz's November 2012 acquisition of Dollar-Thrifty Automotive Group for $2.6 billion, after a two-year bidding war with Avis Budget Group. The deal expanded Hertz's car rental brand portfolio and yielded combined annual sales of US$10,200,000,000. As part of the deal, Hertz also sold its low-cost Advantage brand, and gave up 29 Dollar Thrifty airport locations.

=== Expansion of Hertz Corporation (2013–2014) ===
In May 2013, Frissora announced Hertz would relocate to Estero, Florida from New Jersey, with the new building to combine staff from both Dollar Thrifty and Hertz. By November 2013, Hertz was the "largest publicly traded rental car operator in the United States."

By that time the total number of locations increased from 7,600 to 11,200. In 2014 Reuters wrote that Frissora was "credited for the shrewd acquisitions that helped Hertz to grow into a $12.7 billion company - more than two-and-a-half times its value when it listed in 2006, shortly after Frissora took the helm."

In the summer of 2014, activist investors at Hertz asserted they lacked confidence in management due to reported "accounting mistakes and internal control issues". Consequently, activist investors pushed for board and management replacements including Frissora. Citing personal reasons, he resigned as CEO, chairman, and director on September 8, 2014. Frissora officially left the roles in November that same year. Hertz reported Frissora's departure was "without cause".

In 2020, the SEC charged Frissora with aiding and abetting when filing financial disclosures while he was CEO of Hertz. In August 2020, Frissora agreed to pay nearly $2 million to settle the charges.

=== Appointment to Caesar's CEO (2015) ===
In February 2015, Caesars Entertainment Corporation announced Frissora would replace Gary Loveman as their new CEO and president, effective July 1, 2015. Frissora immediately joined the board and Loveman temporarily remained Caesars' chairman to help with the transition.

Several weeks prior to Frissora's January appointment, the company's casino operating unit had voluntarily filed for reorganization through a Chapter 11 bankruptcy. Caesars Entertainment Corp. awarded its chief executive officer $29.4 million in compensation for 2017, the year the casino operator emerged from bankruptcy, which included a $2 million salary, $4.5 million cash bonus, $16.5 million in retention-restricted stock, a long-term cash award of $6 million and $400,000 for repriced options.

As CEO designee from February to July 2015, Frissora stated he had "visited most of [Caesars'] domestic properties, met with all of the company's senior leaders" and focused on "identifying new opportunities to drive growth and efficiency." Thereafter, he joined the board of Caesars Entertainment Corporation and was appointed president and CEO of Caesars Enterprise Services (CES), as well as the CES Steering Committee.

On April 16, 2019, Caesars announced that Affinity Gaming CEO Anthony Rodio would be transitioning into the role of Caesars CEO within 30 days, replacing Frissora, who announced his intention to step down in November 2018.

=== Push for new gaming platforms (2016-2017) ===
After officially assuming position as of CEO and President of Caesars Entertainment. In September 2015, Frissora announced new experiments by Caesars to appeal to younger gamblers such as a "casino within a casino" on the Las Vegas Strip with interchangeable walls to change the feel of the space as needed and "skill-based slots", recently legalized by the state of Nevada. Under Frissora's leadership, in November 2015, Caesars announced it would cede management of its Horseshoe Casino Cleveland, Horseshoe Casino Cincinnati, and ThistleDown Racino resorts to Rock Gaming, with the transfer to be completed by June 2016.

Frissora rang the opening bell for Nasdaq in New York in October 2017.

== Non-executive board and council memberships ==
Frissora has been involved with a number of boards and organizations beyond his direct employers. In June 2002 he joined of the board of NCR Corporation, holding a directorship at NCR until November 2009. He became a director of FMC Corporation in January 2004, a role he held until August 2006. In December 2009, he became a director at both Delphi Automotive PLC, and Delphi Holdings LLP, also joining Delphi's finance committee and their nominating and governance committee. Furthermore, in December 2009 he became a director of Walgreens Boots Alliance, holding the position until April 1, 2015.

As a Walgreen Co. director, he was chairman of their finance committee as of 2014, as well as a member of their nominating and governance committee. He was chairman of Walgreens finance committee until he left the board in April 2015.

He has been a member of the Business Roundtable since before 2005, and is on the World Economic Forum's Automotive Board of Governors. He is also a member of the G100.

In February 2025, Frissora joined the Board of Directors of BioAdaptives, Inc., a company specializing in natural health and wellness products.

== Recognition and awards ==
Frissora was named No. 5 on Business Travel News' list of the 25 Most Influential Business Travel Executives of 2012. In addition, he was presented with the 2012 Oliver R. Grace Award for Distinguished Service in Advancing Cancer Research by the Cancer Research Institute.

== Personal life ==
Frissora is divorced from his ex-wife Jennifer Marie (née Brossman), with whom he has four children.
