= Dollar Rent A Car =

American car rental brand

- Formerly: Dollar A Day Rent A Car
- Type: Subsidiary
- Industry: Car rental
- Founded: 1965; 61 years ago, in Los Angeles, California, United States
- Founder: Henry Caruso
- Headquarters: Estero, Florida, United States
- Parent: Hertz Global Holdings
- Website: dollar.com

Dollar Rent A Car (formerly known as Dollar A Day Rent A Car) is an American car rental agency, headquartered in Estero, Florida, with offices in many countries around the world. Dollar is owned by The Hertz Corporation, along with other agencies including Hertz Rent A Car, Firefly Car Rental and Thrifty Car Rental. Dollar typically caters to budget-conscious leisure travelers.

== History ==
Dollar Rent A Car was founded in Los Angeles, California, in 1965 by Henry J. Caruso. It was purchased by The Chrysler Corporation for an undisclosed amount on August 15, 1990, and joined Chrysler's Pentastar Transportation Group in Tulsa, Oklahoma. This acquisition merged Dollar Rent A Car with Thrifty Car Rental – forming Dollar Thrifty Automotive Group in 1997. Dollar's focus remained on company-owned rental locations at major airports to service both tourists and leisure rental markets.

Both Dollar Rent A Car and Thrifty Car Rental formed an agreement in 1997 with The SABRE Group, Inc., a leader in electronic distribution systems within the travel industry, to manage the subsidiaries’ routine information processing, system engineering, and reservation management functions in a secure underground facility.

Operating under Dollar Thrifty Automotive Group, Dollar earned US$617.53 million in 1997, with company-owned stores generating 91 percent of revenue, compared to $499.17 million in 1996. By this time, the car rental provider employed a staff of 5,400 as of September 1997. Dollar maintained an average fleet of 61,336 vehicles in 872 locations in 1997, compared to 1995's fleet of 52,571.

In the coming years, the combined fleets and US locations of both Dollar and Thrifty grew in the following numbers:

- 2001 – 78,600 cars, 268 US locations
- 2004 – A fleet of 78,900 cars, 245 US locations
- 2006 – 85,000 cars and 407 US corporate locations
- 2009 – 106,245 cars and 600 US locations
- 2012 – A fleet of 122,000 cars in 470 US locations

The Hertz Corporation announced the company would purchase of Dollar Thrifty Automotive Group for US$2.3 billion (equivalent to $3 billion in 2025) on November 19, 2012.

As a result of the impact of the COVID-19 pandemic on tourism, on April 30, 2020, Hertz announced that it has missed lease payments on its fleet and was seeking support of its lenders in an attempt to avoid bankruptcy. On May 22, 2020, the company filed for Chapter 11 bankruptcy because it did not reach an agreement with top lenders. The company emerged from bankruptcy in early 2021.

== International growth ==
Dollar connected with Paris-based Europcar International in 1997 to integrate reservations systems in the United States and Europe. This allowed Europcar and Dollar customers in the United States, Canada, and Latin America to reserve cars belonging to each brand beginning February 1, 1998. The collaboration resulted in 2,800 locations in 134 countries with a shared fleet of approximately 175,000 vehicles.

With increased concentration on foreign-tour operators, especially those in the United Kingdom, Dollar expanded their car rental services through corporate-owned locations in Europe in 2013. Initial focus grew towards Belgium, France, Luxembourg, the Netherlands, resulting in 114 corporate location openings by summer 2013. An additional 22 locations opened in Spain shortly after. By 2014, Dollar and Thrifty Automotive signed a partnership agreement with Ryan's Investments in Ireland in February 2014. This gave the car rental brand locations in all major Irish airports and downtown locations in Cork, Dublin, Kerry, Knock, and Shannon. Dollar and Thrifty reported 29 new locations in Italy, including Rome, Milan, Venice and Naples in February 2015.

Dollar's Poland operations began in 2008, and later merged with NFM Group, an independent rental company providing long- and short-terms rentals in Poland, in March 2017. It was later announced in May that Dollar would operate in Colombo, the capital of Sri Lanka, after a multi-brand partnership agreement with franchise partner Andrew The Car Rental Co. Ltd. This provided modern fleets and chauffeur services amongst Hertz, Dollar, and Thrifty locations in the area.

== Fleet and rental locations ==
By 1997, Dollar Rent A Car was known to serve value-oriented travelers, including travel for leisure, small business, and tourism. In the late 1990s, rental locations in Florida, California, Hawaii, and Nevada were held responsible for 80% of Dollar's 1996 fiscal revenue, and 76% in 1997. By 2011, international areas served include Australia, Canada, Caribbean Islands, Latin America, with a concentration on local markets and airport locations.

Along with car, truck, and crossover rental services, Dollar Rent A Car provides ski racks, child safety seats, navigation, and operational support to renters. As of February 2017, Dollar Rent A Car and Thrifty Car Rental maintained 1,500 franchised branches, 840 of which are in the United States and Canada.

In recent years, Dollar has expanded their fleet to offer more upscale rental vehicles, which include vehicles such as the BMW X1, BMW X3, Cadillac Escalade, Infiniti QX60, Mercedes-Benz CLA, Mercedes-Benz C Class, and Mercedes-Benz E Class AMG.

== Controversies ==
Dollar Rent A Car charged $15 "administrative fees" each time when a customer passed through a cashless toll. In August 2018, Florida Attorney General Pam Bondi filed suit against Dollar and Thrifty rental car companies for allegedly deceiving motorists and charging "grossly inflated" fees. In January 2019, Florida Attorney General has settled the lawsuit against the Dollar and Thrifty rental car companies over misleading toll fees. Customers who rented a car from Dollar or Thrifty between Jan. 1, 2011 and Jan. 7, 2019, and were misled about the fees can file a claim with the Attorney General's Office for a full or partial refund.
