= Henry Caruso =

American businessman (1922–2017)

- Born: Henry Joseph Caruso; February 24, 1922
- Died: November 26, 2017 (aged 95)
- Other name: Henry J. Caruso
- Education: University of Southern California
- Occupation: Businessman
- Spouse: Gloria Restagno
- Children: 3, including Rick Caruso

Henry "Hank" Joseph Caruso (February 24, 1922 – November 26, 2017) was an American businessman and the founder of Dollar Rent A Car.

== Early life ==
Of Italian heritage, Caruso was born in Pennsylvania. His father, August Caruso, worked in the landscape business and decided that the weather in the Mid-Atlantic was problematic and moved the family to Los Angeles, California in the mid-1920s. They first moved to East Los Angeles but soon settled in the Silver Lake neighborhood where Henry and his brothers, Albert and Lawrence, were raised.

He enrolled at the University of Southern California (USC) in 1939 with plans to study medicine, but left to join the US Navy Air Corp and earned the distinction of Navy Pilot LTJG. He returned to USC after the war to finish his studies.

== Career ==
Caruso entered the automobile business by acquiring a number of new car dealerships, including from General Motors, Ford and Chrysler. In the early days of TV he virtually monopolized commercial television airwaves in Los Angeles with his radio and TV singing commercials where he billed himself as "H.J. Caruso—he's the greatest." The Desert Sun called him the "glamour boy of automotive salesmanship in Los Angeles."

He founded Dollar Rent-A-Car in 1966 as Dollar A Day Rent A Car. After opening five locations, he was determined to open lucrative airport locations; however the "big three" car rental companies, Hertz, Avis and National, had already established locations in airports and made it difficult for the new company to enter the market.

This led to a legal fight in the 1970s that caused the Federal Trade Commission to take action and prohibit any practices that discriminated against small companies vying for airport locations. Many airports, newspapers, and local townships rejected his request to display the "Dollar A Day" sign as they felt it constituted false advertising.

In 1973, the Palm Springs, California Planning Commission rejected Caruso's request for approval of a "Dollar A Day" sign as "misleading advertising." He later changed the name to Dollar Rent-A-Car. Under his 20 years of guidance it grew to be the fourth largest car rental agency worldwide with over 1,400 locations. He sold the company to the Chrysler Corporation in 1990 (it is now a part of the Dollar-Thrifty Automotive Group).

Caruso was also the head of Caruso Affiliated, which owned his car dealerships, and HJC Investment Corporation, an investment company.

== Legal history ==
On April 25, 1957, Caruso was indicted by the Grand Jury of Los Angeles County for criminal conspiracy to defraud and cheat, forgery and grand theft related to his automobile dealerships. Caruso pleaded guilty to two counts (forgery and grand theft) of the April 25 indictment.

Caruso was given a suspended sentence with probation granted for a period of ten years conditioned on his spending the first year in the county jail, paying a fine of $10,000 and remaining "out of the automobile business or any business involving sales to the public."

In 1970, the Superior Court of California set aside the guilty plea. Having fulfilled the terms of his probation, he was allowed to withdraw his guilty plea and enter a plea of not guilty and the charges against him were dismissed.

== Personal life ==
Caruso lived with his wife, former fashion model Gloria (nee' Restagno) in Beverly Hills, California. He has one daughter, Cristina Caruso, and two sons, Rick Caruso, a billionaire builder and retail operator and owner and CEO of Caruso Affiliated, which has built and owns and operates such retail properties as The Grove at Farmers Market and The Americana at Brand, and Marc Caruso, a Los Angeles music executive and CEO of Angry Mob Music.
