= Firefly Car Rental =

American car rental brand

- Type: Subsidiary
- Industry: Car rental
- Founded: 2013; 13 years ago
- Headquarters: Estero, Florida, United States
- Area served: Europe, United States, Mexico, Australia, New Zealand
- Parent: Hertz Global Holdings
- Website: fireflycarrental.com

Firefly Car Rental is a low cost American car rental brand owned by The Hertz Corporation. Hertz developed the new brand to replace Advantage Rent a Car which had to be sold following the acquisition of Dollar Thrifty Automotive Group.

== History ==
It first opened in March 2013 with branches in Europe, with American branches following in September 2013. In August 2014 Firefly opened its first location in the Middle-East serving Dubai Airport in the UAE and in September 2014 opened its first locations in Australia. As of January 2015 it has over 100 locations in 13 countries.
