= Frank J. Manheim =

- Born: August 18, 1910; New York, New York
- Died: May 6, 2002 (aged 91); London, England
- Occupation: Investment Banker

Frank J. Manheim was a college professor, businessman, author and horse racing enthusiast in the United States. He taught at Union College in Schenectady, New York in the 1930s and worked at the investment banking firm Lehman Brothers for over 35 years, where he was a partner. He was a collector of French glass paperweights and wrote a book on that topic. He also wrote a travel book on London, where he had retired and where he died.

Manheim served as Lehman Brothers’ principal partner in the post-war commercial success of Western Europe, managing much of the U.S. investment into the continent. He was named a director of more than 20 major publicly traded corporations including manufacturers and was one of the key influences in the rise of Hertz Corporation to its global leadership in rental cars.

He owned a successful racing stable, was adept at fox hunting, and was involved in public charities in New York City.

== Early life ==
Manheim was born in New York City August 18, 1910. His parents, Armin Manheim (b. 1876) and Theresa Manheim (b.1880), immigrants from the Austro Hungarian Empire. Manheim had three siblings. An older brother Paul Manheim, (b. 1906 in what is now the Slovak Republic), a prominent collector of Asian art and a partner at Lehman Brothers. His older sister, Alice Manheim Kaplan (b. 1903, Budapest) was a New York socialite, patron of the arts, and former president of the American Federation of Arts. Manheim’s younger sister, Louise Manheim Espy (b. 1919 New York City) was the wife of renowned writer and wordsmith, Willard Espy, who credited her for his success as the author of 16 books.

== Education ==
Manheim attended high school at the University Preparatory School in New York. In 1932 he earned a bachelor's degree in history from the University of North Carolina . He studied at Harvard University for a semester, then continuing his education in Germany at the University of Bonn then at the University of Berlin. In September 1933, he returned to the US to study at Columbia University until June 1936 focusing in American and Modern European history, economics, sociology and English.

== Academic career ==
From 1936 to 1938 Manheim was an instructor in European History and French Literature at Union College in Schenectady, New York. In 1937, under his leadership as faculty advisor to the university’s International Relations Club, the school sponsored a series of eight radio roundtable discussions on then current news, such as US Latin American policy and re-arming US forces. Later that year, Manheim was embroiled in controversy when he announced the speaking appearance of Fritz Kuhn, the leader of the German American Bund. Manheim said of Kuhn, who had been denied a similar speaking engagement in Schenectady earlier, “I abhor and hate the principles for which Mr. Kuhn is said to stand…but subscribe wholeheartedly to the doctrine of free speech; he received phone calls threatening bodily harm as a result . He also showed a lighter side, acting as Alexander Hamilton in the historic drama One People, written by Dixon Ryan Fox, the school’s president.

== Business career ==
Manheim moved to New York City in the early 1940s.

=== Publishing ===
In 1940, Manheim became the president of Howell, Soskin and Co., a publishing firm that had taken over the New York editorial and business personnel of Stackpole Sons of Harrisburg, Pennsylvania. One of the first books published by the new firm was Stalin’s Kampf, a collection of the Soviet dictator’s writings. The firm also published Supreme Court Justice Harlan Fiske Stone’s Public Control of Business.

=== Investment banking and directorships ===
Manheim joined the industrial department of the New York investment banking firm Lehman Brothers in 1943, becoming a partner in 1951. He became a member of the board of Sharon Steel Corporation in 1951. He joined the board of Ketay Corporation, manufacturer of high precision instruments, in 1954; . In 1955, Ketay merged with Norden Laboratories Corporation (manufacturer of WWII’s Norden bombsight) to form Norden-Ketay Corporation, and he became a director of the expanded company.

In 1954, he joined the board of New York’s Omnibus Corporation (Hertz Corp.) during a period of the company’s expansion and strategic growth, Omnibus purchased Hertz Corporation, previously owned by General Motors; the combined firm took the Hertz name. Under Manheim’s direction, Hertz began a series of buy-backs of Hertz franchises, then expanded globally. In 1953 the company’s market capitalization was $7 million. ($67 million in 2020.) and grew to nearly $100 million in 1965. ($559 million in 2020) This global growth was considered as an example of Lehman Brothers’ ingenuity.

In 1955, he was named to the board of Glen-Alden Coal Company; he was at that time also was a director at Associated Transport Inc., Pittsburgh Consolidation Coal Co., Southern Express Company, Kagran Corp. and the Chicago Motor Coach Company. He and two other directors of Glen-Alden resigned from its board after a conflict over their support for the purchase of Chicago’s Maremont Automotive Products.

In March 1957, Manheim was elected to the board of silverware manufacturer, the International Silver Company. In November 1957, he was named chairman of the finance committee and a director of Hertz-American Express International Ltd., a new joint venture between American Express and Hertz, which took over Hertz car rental subsidiaries in France. Mexico, Cuba, Puerto Rico and Hawaii. In 1958, he was appointed to the board of the auto-maker, Studebaker Corporation. In 1966 he was the spokesman for an anonymous investment group making an unsuccessful bid for a major share in the company.

In 1959, Manheim led the twenty partners of Lehman Brothers in an unsuccessful bid to buy the then-railroad-owned Railway Express Agency. In 1960, he became a director of Chicago’s City Products Corporation.

In December 1960, he became chairman of the Executive Committee at Hertz, and joined the board of variety retail chain H.L. Green Co. In 1962, he was elected chairman of New York-based Drew Chemical’s board. In 1963, he joined the board of New York-based apparel maker, Warner Brothers Company. In 1964, he became a director of Buckingham Corporation, exclusive US distributor of Cutty Sark Scotch Whisky. In 1970, he was a director of Bankers Trust International, Ltd. of London and chairman of A. Manheim and Co., a New York-based family investment firm. In 1974 he was named chairman of Amex International Limited of London, a United Kingdom “authorized bank, ” and became a director of American Express International Development Co. (AEIDC), a subsidiary of American Express that was a holding company for merchant banks and financial service companies. In 1975 Amex International Ltd. acquired Rothschild International Bank Ltd.(Rothschild & Co), and he became the deputy chairman.

After a plethora of corporate name changes in the late sixties – the Manhattan Shirt Company became Manhattan Industries, Warner Brothers Corp. changed to The Warnaco Group, and Koret of California recast itself as Koracorp Industries – Manheim (a board member of The Warnaco Group) was sought by the media for comment. “It doesn't matter what your name is,” he responded, “but what you do with it.” That would be hard to argue with, said the New York Times.

=== Investment banking in Europe ===
In 1962 Manheim was named one of three American Directors of CEFISA (Compañía Española De Financiación, Sociedad Anónima), an association of American, British, French and Spanish investment banks. He announced the sale of over 400,000 shares of Buckingham Corporation stock on the London and other European stock exchanges in 1964. Lehman Brothers underwrote the offering. In 1966 he took the lead on the $27.5 million initial loan to Transalpine Holdings, SA, of Luxembourg for an oil pipeline from (then) Yugoslavia to (then) West Germany, described as the biggest in recent European history. He was a keynote speaker at the Federal Trust Conference in London in 1966 where he noted that voluntary restraint policies are not only unsound but, in the long view, are not practical. He also pointed out that many European investors were switching to European issues.

Manheim was the Lehman Brothers’ partner active in Eurobond financing. In 1968, when the sale of US corporate bonds in Europe was significant with Lehman Brothers managing half the issues, Mannheim, speaking for the firm, estimated that American firms raised over $5 billion from European investors. ”

== Writing ==
Manheim collected paperweights. and in 1968, wrote a book on collecting French paperweights titled A garland of weights: some notes on collecting antique French glass paperweights for those who don't. It was published by Bodley Head in London. After moving to London, Manheim wrote another book, Lion Hunting in London and Hints for the Prospective Spotter, 1975, Cadueus Press.

== Public service and charities ==
In 1954 he incorporated a foundation - New York City’s Manheim Foundation, Inc., which focused on general giving with emphasis on welfare and education. The Manheim Brothers, Frank and Paul, were the foundation’s directors.

Manheim was a director of New York’s Fresh Air Fund, which has offered, for over a century, free country vacations to inner city children. He was the chairman of the 1964 Annual Fund Drive for the Red Cross.

During WWII, Manheim was a member of the Office of Strategic Services, predecessor of the Central Intelligence Agency (CIA). The scope of his activities is unclear, but in 1945 he was associated with a secret mission in the Netherlands.

== Horse racing stable and other activities ==
He owned a racing stable, Overbridge Stable, in the early 1960s. Both the stable and its horses were prominent in steeplechase racing at New York’s Aqueduct track. Horses from the stable won many honors, including the New York Turf Writers Cup and the Annapolis Handicap at Belmont Park. Manheim was also a keen fox hunter, developing his skills on his 111-acre estate (acquired in 1954) in Connecticut near the Aspetuck River. In 1963, he became Master of the Hunt for the County Galway “Blazers” Hunt jointly with American film director John Huston.

Manheim was an avid bicyclist, riding to and from work on the streets of London; this provided the background for his travel book, Lion Hunting in London.

He was a member of the New York Historical Society.

== Personal life ==
Manheim married Ellen C. Althouse in 1939. They had two children, Katherine Manheim Ryan and Grant Coffin Manheim.

Manheim retired from Lehman Brothers in the 1970s and moved to London, where he died in 2002.
