= Sixt =

German multinational car rental company

Sixt SE
- Trade name: Sixt
- Type: Public (Societas Europaea)
- Traded as: FWB: SIX2; SDAX
- ISIN: DE0007231326
- Industry: Car rental
- Founded: 1912; 114 years ago
- Founder: Martin Sixt
- Headquarters: Pullach, Munich, Germany
- Key people: Alexander Sixt and Konstantin Sixt (Co-CEOs), Erich Sixt (Chairman of the Supervisory Board)
- Services: Car rental; Car sharing; Vehicle for hire; Ride-hailing; Subscription
- Revenue: ▲€4.28 billion (2024)
- Net income: ▲€286 million (2024)
- Total assets: ▲€7.14 billion (2024)
- Total equity: ▲€2.15 billion (2024)
- Number of employees: ▲8,941 (2025)
- Website: sixt.com

Sixt SE is a German multinational car rental and mobility service provider with about 2,000 locations in more than 100 countries. Sixt SE acts as a parent and holding company of the Sixt Group, which is internationally active in the business areas of vehicle rental, car sharing, ride-hailing, and subscription.

The majority of the company is owned by the Sixt family, who manage the company. The remaining share is tradeable stock: SIX2 (XETRA).

== History ==
=== Foundation ===
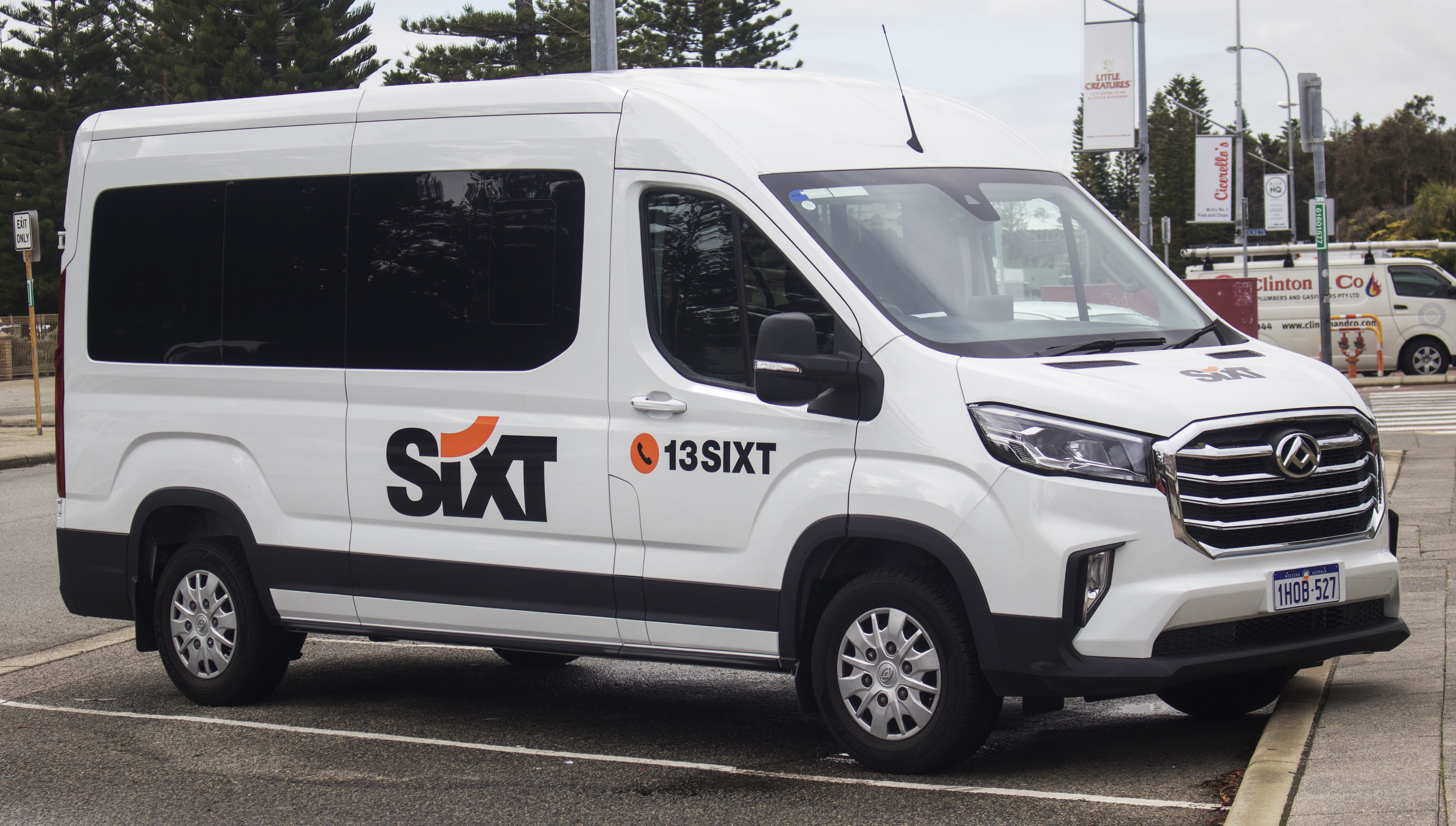
LDV Deliver 9 with Sixt

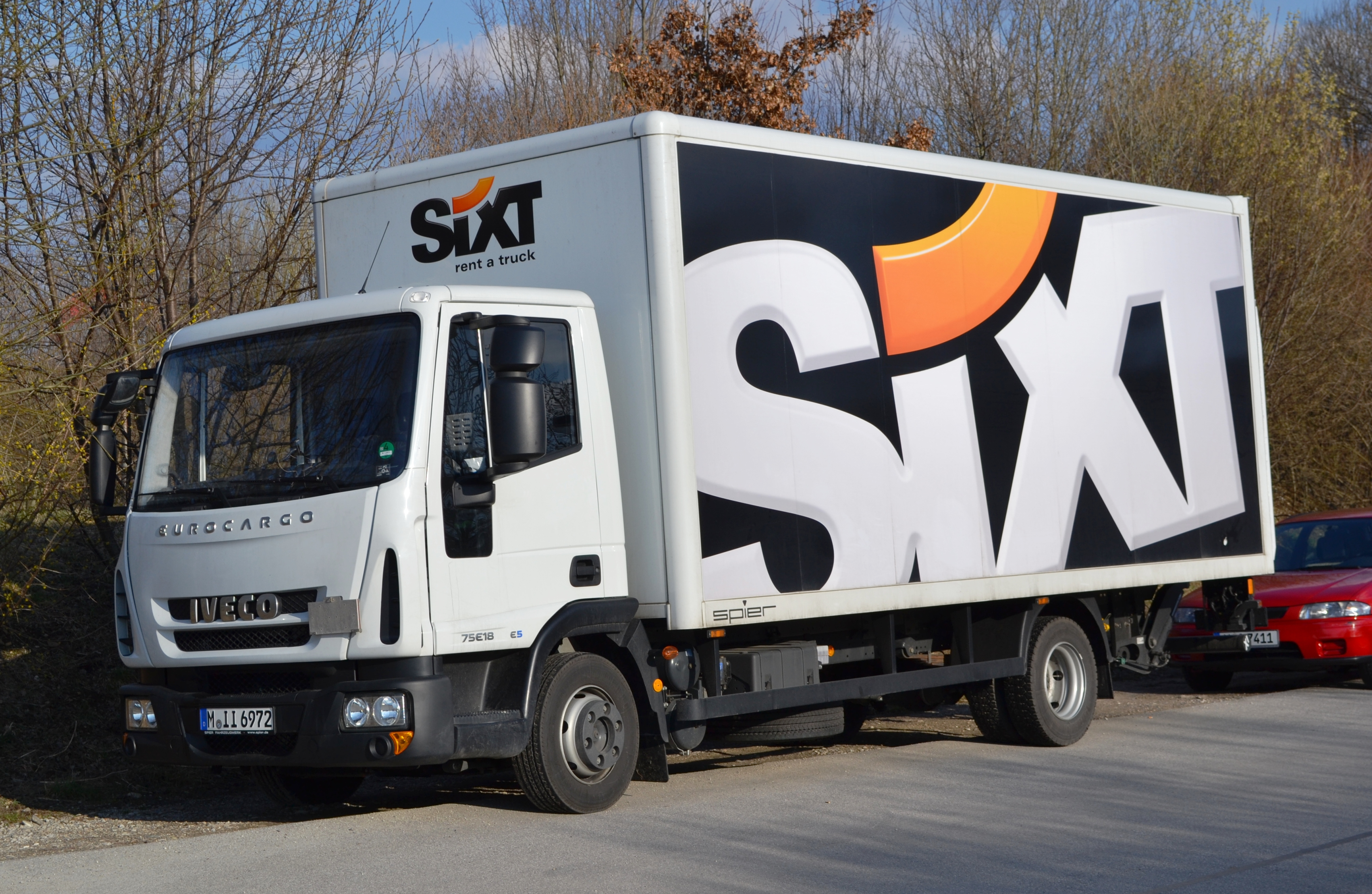
Iveco Eurocargo with Sixt

In 1912, Martin Sixt founded the company with a fleet of three cars, creating the first car rental company in Bavaria. During the First World War, the fleet was confiscated and used by the German Army. After the war, business resumed, but the fleet was once again seized by the German Army at the outbreak of World War II. When the war concluded, the company rebounded, establishing a taxi fleet for members of the United States Army stationed in Germany. It then opened a taxi business in Munich with the first radio taxis. In 1951, the car rental company Auto Sixt was founded.

=== 1980s ===
In 1982, Auto Sixt was renamed Sixt Autovermietung GmbH, with the name Sixt/Budget in the logo. The company was transformed again in 1986, this time becoming Sixt AG, a corporation traded on the German stock exchange. In 1988, the subsidiary Sixt Leasing GmbH was established.

=== 1990s ===
In 1993, the operating business of the AG was handed over to another subsidiary, Sixt GmbH & Co Autovermietung KG. Sixt AG acted thereafter as a holding company of the group. Also in 1993, Sixt bought the assets of its competitor Autoverleih Buchbinder, operating the brand briefly before finally discontinuing it. Sixt had failed to secure the naming rights, and subsequently Buchbinder was re-established and continued operating in the market.

In 1999, the Federal Court of Justice (BGH) issued a landmark judgment against Sixt for illegal price fixing, requiring it to pay damages to its franchisees. Sixt had de facto controlled the pricing for the independent franchisees' prices, as they were part of the Germany-wide reservation system. In the event of pricing discrepancies, the rental agreements were returned to Germany. This was deemed inadmissible under German antitrust law (price fixing of the second hand) and forbidden by the BGH.

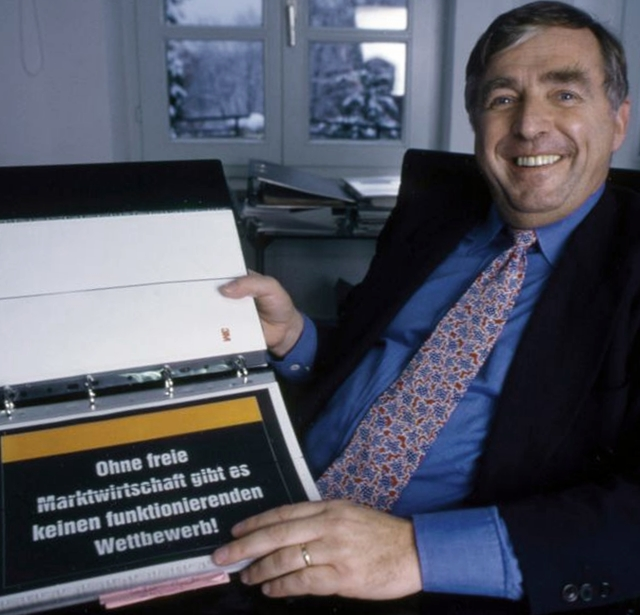
Erich Sixt, 1997

=== 2000s ===
In 2003, the corporation was forced to defend itself against hedge fund manager Florian Homm, who had speculated on declining stock prices. Homm was ultimately fined for price manipulation. In 2005, the Management Board Compensation Disclosure Act (VorstOG) entered into force. Sixt AG became the first company in Germany to exercise the right not to disclose directors' salaries without a shareholder vote of at least 75% majority. CEO Erich Sixt held at this time 56.8% of Sixt ordinary shares, corresponding to 89% of votes at the general meeting, meaning he was essentially able to determine the outcome. Overall, 98% of the voters approved the non-disclosure of executive pay.

In 2006, Sixt made a bid to take over its competitor, Europcar, when owner Volkswagen offered it for sale. In addition to antitrust concerns (Sixt at that time had approximately 23% market share, Europcar 22%), there was also resistance from the Europcar works council, which feared job cuts after the merger. Volkswagen finally accepted an offer by the French investment company Eurazeo. Since 2007 and via subsidiary companies, Sixt has operated the online brokerage of motor vehicles with the websites Autocommunity Carmondo, Mystocks, RadAlert, Winebase, and autohaus24.

=== 2010s ===
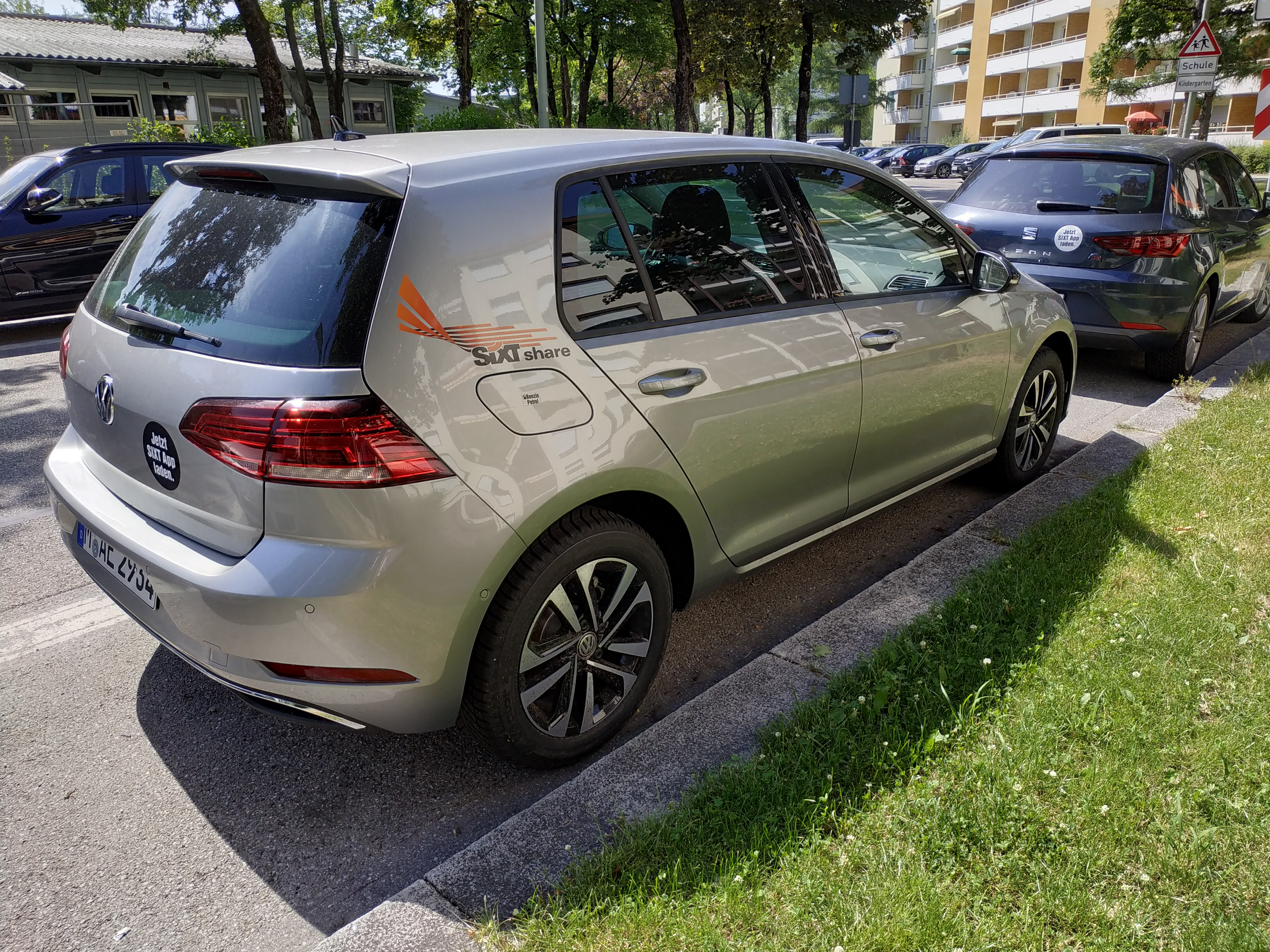
One of the cars of the SIXT Share fleet. Munich, 2019.

In 2010, former employees claimed that Sixt was opposed to setting up a works council. The company's management denied the allegation. In 2011, the company opened its first branch in the USA in Florida. In 2013, Sixt AG was converted to the legal form of a European Company (Societas Europaea) and since then has been called Sixt SE. As part of the transition, a European Works Council ("Sixt Europe Leaders Forum") was founded in 2013. In May 2015, Sixt brought its subsidiary Sixt Leasing AG to the Frankfurt Stock Exchange.

At the beginning of 2018, Sixt sold its shares in car sharing service DriveNow for 209 million euros to its joint venture partner BMW. In February 2019, Sixt started an own mobility platform and a new car sharing service named Sixt share. The services car rental, car sharing, ride hailing and car subscriptions are all combined into one app.

=== 2020s ===
In 2020, Sixt sold all its shares in Sixt Leasing SE in order to focus its business on its mobility services. In June 2020, Sixt acquired 10 concessions at U.S. airports from Advantage Rent a Car. The acquisition increased the number of Sixt stations in the United States to more than 85. At end of July 2020, Lyft and Sixt announced a joint venture, where Lyft app users can rent a car from both partners through the app.

In December 2021, the company expanded to Australia via a partnership with the NRMA. 160 branches and a total of 16,000 vehicles are thus franchised under the Sixt brand.

In 2022, Sixt becomes the first car rental company in Europe to offer BYD vehicles.

In December 2023, the company announced it was phasing out Teslas from its lineup following a price cut that hurt residual values in its lineup. The next month, the company announced it was buying as many as 250,000 vehicles from Stellantis NV. The order would be a combination of traditional combustion engine vehicles, plug-in hybrids, and electric cars to be used in Europe and North America. These moves came amid an industry-wide shift in how non-traditional cars would be used. At the time of the announcement, the company still had plans to electrify up to 90% of its fleet in Europe.

At the end of 2024, Sixt operated over 100 branches in 25 US states with 50 branches at US airports. Also that year, the company recorded global revenue above 4 billion euros, for the first time.

== Sponsorships ==
Sixt signed a sponsorship agreement with Galatasaray before the start of the 2020–21 Süper Lig season. In October 2023, the company started sponsoring the Los Angeles Lakers and the Chicago Bulls NBA teams.
