= Dollar Thrifty Automotive Group =

Former holding company

Dollar Thrifty Automotive Group, Inc.
- Company type: Public
- Traded as: Formerly NYSE: DTG
- Industry: Car rental and Leasing
- Founded: November 4, 1997
- Defunct: November 19, 2012
- Fate: Acquired by The Hertz Corporation
- Headquarters: Tulsa, Oklahoma, United States

Dollar Thrifty Automotive Group is the former holding company of Thrifty Car Rental and Dollar Rent A Car. Dollar Thrifty Automotive began to operate as an independent car rental subsidiary of the Chrysler Corporation on November 4, 1997 while continuing to support its two brands, Dollar Rent A Car and Thrifty Car Rental. It was acquired by The Hertz Corporation for US$2.3 billion on November 19, 2012.

== Company development ==
Established in 1990 by the Chrysler Corporation, Dollar Thrifty Automotive was part of Chrysler's Pentastar Transportation Group in Tulsa, Oklahoma, which also included General Rent-A-Car and Snappy Car Rental. Chrysler purchased Thrifty Rent A Car System, Inc. in 1989, and Dollar Rent A Car Systems, Inc. in 1990, forming Dollar Thrifty Automotive Group. By 1997, Dollar Thrifty Automotive earned US$843.94 million in sales, employed a staff of 5,200, and maintained a combined rental fleet of approximately 100,000 vehicles.

Chrysler announced that Dollar Thrifty Automotive filed with the U.S. Securities and Exchange Commission to offer its common stock in November 1997. On December 23, 1997, Dollar Thrifty Automotive completed its initial public offering on the New York Stock Exchange and was traded as DTG. Before the Thrifty Car Rental and Dollar Rent A Car brands acted as their own subsidiaries under Dollar Thrifty Automotive in December 2002, Dollar Thrifty Automotive operated as one car rental group to reduce expenses. By 2003, the Dollar and Thrifty brands operated in over 70 countries around the world, including approximately 800 corporate and franchised locations in the United States and Canada.

== The rental fleet ==
From 1990 to 2009, Dollar Thrifty Automotive primarily rented Chrysler, Dodge, and Jeep vehicles to customers within the United States. Some locations featured Mazda, Nissan, and Toyota models as well. In October 2009, it was announced the company would move away from use of Chrysler Group vehicles with hope to better diversify its rental fleet. It was announced the fleet would now include Ford Motor Company, General Motors, Nissan, Hyundai, Kia, Chrysler, and other vehicles. This fleet expansion helped Dollar Thrifty shares on the New York Stock Exchange rise to a 52-week high of $27.50 before closing at $26.33 – up 0.57%.

== Former key executives ==
Dollar Thrifty Automotive Group's first president and CEO, Joseph E. Cappy, was the final president and CEO of American Motors Corporation. He came to Chrysler in 1987 after it purchased AMC and was put in charge of Chrysler's car rental subsidiaries in 1993 as part of a corporate reshuffling following the retirement of Lee Iacocca. Cappy oversaw the relocation of the company from Detroit to Tulsa in 1994 and its spin off from Chrysler in 1997.

Gary L. Paxton was elected president and CEO of Dollar Thrifty Automotive in October 2003 in response to Cappy's retirement. Paxton's career with Dollar Thrifty Automotive began after working for the first Dollar Rent A Car franchise in California in 1968; he later moved to senior management positions of Vice President of Operations (1972 to 1974), Vice President of Properties (1974 to 1982), Senior Vice President of Operations and Properties (1986 to 1990), Executive Vice President (1997 to 2002), and Chief Airport Negotiator of Dollar (1974 to 1990). Paxton oversaw the automotive group's 7,000 employees—700 of which worked at the Tulsa headquarters—as well as the daily operation of both brands.

In response to Paxton's retirement in December, Dollar Thrifty Automotive Group's Board of Directors announced Scott L. Thompson as the company's President, CEO, and newest board member in October 2008. Paxton would provide consulting services to the car rental company through October 31, 2009.

Thompson joined the company on May 23, 2008, as Senior Executive Vice President and Chief Financial Officer, stepping away from his role with Group 1 Automotive, a New York Stock Exchange listed and Fortune 500 company. In addition, R. Scott Anderson, who joined the brand in 1987, would act as Senior Executive Vice President and be held responsible for corporate and franchise store operations, global sales, and marketing efforts. Anderson was promoted to Chief Marketing Officer in 2008.

== Acquisition by the Hertz Corporation ==
In 2009, Hertz Global Holdings made an initial offer to purchase the Tulsa-based car rental company for $41 per share. By April 2010, negotiations had led Hertz to an offer of US$1.27 billion, which was increased to US$1.5 billion, but was rejected a third time by Dollar Thrifty shareholders. In July 2011, Hertz's bid was increased to US$1.91 billion, competing against rival Avis Budget Group's offer of US$1.55 billion. Finally, on November 19, 2012, Hertz Global Holdings former chairman and CEO Mark P. Frissora announced the company's purchase of Dollar Thrifty Automotive Group for US$2.3 billion.

The Dollar Thrifty Automotive Group was separated into two subsidiaries, Thrifty Car Rental and Dollar Rent A Car, under the Hertz Corporation. Each operates with its own sales, marketing, rental fleets, and franchise locations from Hertz's headquarters in Estero, Florida under president and CEO Kathryn V. Marinello.

== Dollar Rent A Car ==
Dollar Rent A Car Logo

Formerly known as Dollar A Day Rent A Car, Dollar Rent A Car Systems, Inc. was founded by Henry J. Caruso in Los Angeles, California in 1965. It was purchased for an undisclosed amount on August 15, 1990 by The Chrysler Corporation, which merged Dollar Rent A Car and Thrifty Car Rental into Dollar Thrifty Automotive Group.

The Dollar brand focuses on leisure markets and tourism, with 76% of the brand's revenue in 1997 from Florida, California, Hawaii, and Nevada locations. Dollar Rent A Car has more than 370 worldwide locations in 26 countries, including Australia, Canada, the Caribbean region, and Latin America, as well as approximately 230 locations in the United States.

With car rental services in place, Dollar Rent A Car provides ski racks, child safety seats, navigation, and operational support.

== Thrifty Car Rental ==
Thrifty Car Rental Logo

Thrifty Car Rental was incorporated in 1958 as an indirect subsidiary of Thrifty Rent A Car System, Inc. In May 1989, the Thrifty brand purchased Ohio-based Snappy Car Rental Inc., which specialized in insurance replacement rentals, for $40 million. As the former fifth-largest car rental company in North America, Thrifty focuses on airport locations, local markets, franchising, and franchise-support services.

The Thrifty brand agreed to be acquired by the Chrysler Corporation for US$263 million in 1989. In turn, Chrysler Chairman Lee Iacocca announced his company would finance part of Thrifty's acquisition of Snappy for US$40 million.

As a subsidiary of the Hertz Corporation, Thrifty Car Rental operates in 77 countries and territories with 472 locations in the United States and Canada, as well as 589 locations throughout the Americas, Africa, Europe, the Middle East, and the Caribbean and Asia-Pacific regions.

== Awards and recognition ==
- Dollar Thrifty Automotive was listed as a Fortune 1000 Company in 2003.

== See also ==
- Car rental
