= Frank Olson (business executive) =

American business executive (1932–2024)

- Born: Frank Albert Olson; July 19, 1932; San Francisco, California, U.S.
- Died: April 10, 2024 (aged 91); Palm Beach, Florida, U.S.
- Education: City College of San Francisco
- Occupation: Business executive

Frank Albert Olson (July 19, 1932 – April 10, 2024) was an American business executive. He was known for casting running back football player O. J. Simpson in numerous Hertz commercials.

== Life and career ==
Frank Albert Olson was born in San Francisco, California, on July 19, 1932. At the age of 18, he was a night manager at San Francisco International Airport. He graduated from City College of San Francisco in the 1950s and 1960s.

Olson served as Chairman of Hertz from 1980 to 2000, having previously been CEO from 1977 to 1980. He was also an executive vice president of RCA Corporation.

Olson died from complications of COVID-19 on April 10, 2024, at the age of 91. He died on the same day as O. J. Simpson.
