= Herc Rentals =

American equipment rental company

- Type: Public
- Traded as: NYSE: HRI
- Industry: Equipment rental
- Predecessor: The Hertz Corporation
- Founded: 1965; 61 years ago
- Headquarters: Bonita Springs, Florida
- Key people: Lawrence H. Silber (CEO), Aaron D. Birnbaum (President)
- Revenue: ▲$4.376 Billion (2025)
- Net income: ▼US$1.00 million (2025)
- Number of employees: 9,600 (2025)
- Parent: Herc Holdings
- Website: www.hercrentals.com

Herc Rentals is an equipment rental company, owned by Herc Holdings. It was formerly a subsidiary of The Hertz Corporation before being spun-off as a separate company in 2016. The company provides rentals of heavy equipment, tools, power generators and pumps, as well as sales of used equipment.

It primarily serves companies in the construction, manufacturing, energy, civil infrastructure, agriculture, and entertainment industries.

== History ==
=== Early history ===
The company was founded in 1965 as a subsidiary of The Hertz Corporation. It was originally named Hertz Equipment Rental Corporation (HERC). It was the second largest equipment rental company as of 1994. Ford Motor Company considered acquiring HERC in 2002 but opted not to.

In 2013, HERC's headquarters were moved from Park Ridge, New Jersey to Estero, Florida. The company generated over $1.5 billion in revenue in 2013, which was 14% of Hertz's total revenue. Its annual revenue had increased to $1.7 billion by 2015.

=== Spin-off and recent history ===
In 2014, it was announced that Hertz Global planned to spin-off HERC as a separate publicly traded company. The spin-off raised $2 billion for Hertz to reduce its own debt. On July 1, 2016, Herc Rentals Inc. became an independently traded company (NYSE: $HRI). It is currently owned by Herc Holdings.

Lawrence Silber became head of the company in 2015 and led it during the transition, becoming CEO and president after the spinoff. The company was renamed Herc Rentals, based on the acronym for its previous name.

Silber instituted a number of changes to the company and its corporate culture, including hiring a new executive team, opening new branches, and increasing the company's salesforce by 50%. He also diversified the company's revenues with the introduction of new products such as power tools, climate control, power generators, commercial vehicles, and other specialty equipment. Effective January 1, 2026, Aaron Birnbaum was appointed as president of the company, with Silber continuing his role as CEO.

Between 2016 and 2020, the company spent $1.8 billion into expanding its rental fleet. The company invested between $525 and $575 million into its rental fleet in 2021, and over $1 billion in 2023. During this time, the company's revenue and earnings have increased. Its yearly earnings increased by 28% in 2021, and by 35% in 2022. The company continued to grow in 2023, when its revenues increased by 18%.

After spinning off, Herc Rentals pursued active consolidation within the equipment rental industry, completing more than 50 acquisitions in recent years.In addition to earlier acquisitions like CBS Rentals, All-Star Rents, Dwight Crane, Reliable Equipment, All Reach, and Champion Rentals, Herc executed its most significant acquisition to date in 2025 by purchasing H&E Equipment Services for $5.3 billion. The integration of H&E expanded Herc's overall scale by more than 30%, added 165 branch locations to its platform, and significantly expanded its specialty rental fleet offerings across major metropolitan areas.

It is currently one of the largest equipment rental companies in the world and operates in the United States and Canada.
