= Thrifty Car Rental =

American car rental brand

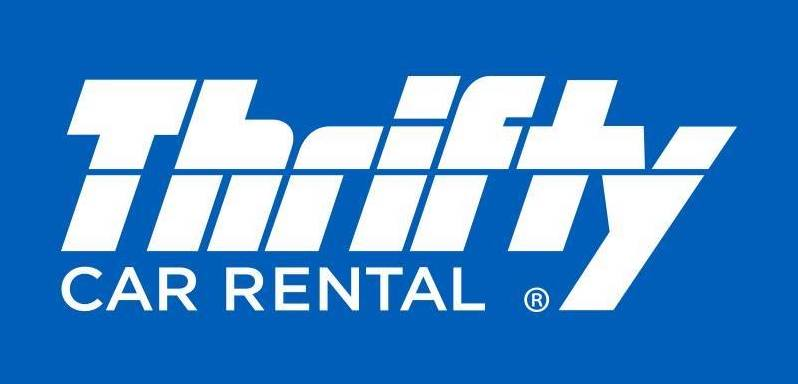
- Type: Subsidiary
- Industry: Car rental
- Founded: 1958; 68 years ago
- Headquarters: Estero, Florida, United States
- Number of locations: 1,061 locations (2022)
- Parent: Hertz Global Holdings
- Website: thrifty.com

Thrifty Car Rental is an American car rental agency, headquartered in Estero, Florida, with offices in many countries around the world. Thrifty is owned by The Hertz Corporation, along with other agencies including Hertz Rent A Car and Dollar Rent A Car. Thrifty typically caters to budget-conscious leisure travelers.

== History ==
Thrifty Car Rental was established in 1958. In 1981, the company was purchased by Bill Lobeck, the husband of Kathy Taylor, and his business partners. The company completed an initial public offering (IPO) of common stock in 1987. It would grow in size by purchasing Ohio-based Snappy Car Rental for US$40,000,000 (equivalent to $103,892,617 in 2025) in May 1989.

By the end of 1989, the company was acquired by the Chrysler Corporation for US$263,000,000 (equivalent to $683,093,960 in 2025) and merged into the company's Pentastar Transportation Group. A few months later, Chrysler would also purchase Dollar Rent A Car. In September 1994, Chrysler would sell Snappy Car Rental to a group of investors.

On December 23, 1997, Chrysler spun off its car rental operations into the Dollar Thrifty Automotive Group with an IPO, as part of an effort to reduce operating expenses at Chrysler. By the end of the 1997 fiscal year, Dollar Thrifty Automotive maintained 872 locations in the United States and employed a staff of 5,400.

Fleet sizes and locations in the United States:

- 1999 - 149 company-owned US locations with 123,814 vehicles between Dollar and Thrifty brands
- 2001 - 130,252 cars in service with 540 locations in the US (includes 162 airport locations)
- 2003 - 310 company-owned and 513 franchisee locations in the US
- 2006 - 407 US corporate locations with revenue of US$1,534,000,000 (equivalent to $2,449,892,704 in 2025)
- 2010 - Thrifty's rental system includes 331 locations in the US and Canada.

The Hertz Corporation announced it would purchase the Dollar Thrifty Automotive Group for US$2,300,000,000 (equivalent to $3,225,467,459 in 2025) on November 19, 2012.

As a result of the impact of the COVID-19 pandemic on tourism, on April 30, 2020, Hertz announced that it has missed lease payments on its fleet and was seeking support from its lenders in an attempt to avoid bankruptcy. On May 22, 2020, the company filed for Chapter 11 bankruptcy because it did not reach an agreement with top lenders. The company emerged from bankruptcy in early 2021.

Dollar and Thrifty locations across the United States have faced multiple class action lawsuits for duplicitous actions.

== Operations ==
The Thrifty brand typically caters to budget-conscious leisure travelers renting from airports.

=== The Blue Chip Rental Express Program ===
Thrifty Car Rental's free Blue Chip Express Rental Program was introduced to the U.S. and Canada in 2008. It offers expedited pickup and returns processes, choosing vehicle type, insurance coverage, designated lines at the counter, and syncing airline rewards.
