= Hertz Global Holdings =

American car rental company

Hertz Global Holdings, Inc.
- Type: Public
- Traded as: Nasdaq: HTZ
- Industry: Car rental and leasing
- Founded: 1918; 108 years ago in Chicago, Illinois, U.S.
- Founder: Walter L. Jacobs
- Headquarters: Estero, Florida, U.S.
- Key people: Gil West (CEO); Justin Keppy (COO)
- Revenue: ▼US$9.05 billion (2024)
- Operating income: ▼US$−1.2 billion (2024)
- Net income: ▼US$−2.9 billion (2024)
- Total assets: ▼US$21.8 billion (2024)
- Total equity: ▼US$153 million (2024)
- Number of employees: c. 26,000 (2024)
- Subsidiaries: Dollar Rent A Car; Firefly Car Rental; Thrifty Car Rental
- Website: hertz.com

Hertz Global Holdings, Inc. (formerly The Hertz Corporation), is an American car rental company based in Estero, Florida. The company operates its namesake Hertz brand, along with the brands Dollar Rent A Car, Firefly Car Rental, and Thrifty Car Rental.

It is one of the three big rental car holding companies in the United States, having a 36% market share, placing it ahead of Avis Budget Group and second to Enterprise Holdings. As one of the largest worldwide vehicle rental companies by sales, locations, and fleet size, Hertz operates in 160 countries in North America, Europe, Latin America, Africa, Asia, the Caribbean, the Middle East, and Oceania.

Hertz was ranked 326th in the 2020 Fortune 500 list. The company filed for bankruptcy on May 22, 2020, citing a sharp decline in revenue and future bookings caused by the COVID-19 pandemic. As of December 31, 2021, the company had revenues of $7.3 billion, assets of $19.7 billion, and 23,000 employees. As of July 1, 2021, the company is no longer in Chapter 11 bankruptcy.

== Company History ==
=== The early years ===
John D. Hertz began selling cars in 1905 for Walden W. Shaw, whose family owned a Chicago bakery and a dealership for Berliet automobiles that were imported from France. The car business was losing money and Hertz agreed to help Shaw in exchange for part ownership of the dealership. Hertz introduced liberal trade-in terms which helped to sell new vehicles, but left Shaw with many used cars. Hertz convinced Shaw to monetize the used cars on by offering them for hire as taxis, names for the meters that showed the fare based on distance traveled. Shaw and Hertz began building their own taxis with Hertz naming the new company Yellow Truck and Coach Manufacturing Company. In 1916, the Walden W. Shaw Livery Company, the Shaw Cab Manufacturing Company, and the Yellow Cab Corporation were established as Shaw Corporation of New York. Shaw resigned as president of the company in 1920, and was succeeded by Hertz.

Hertz developed an interest in the Rent-a-Car Inc., that was founded by Walter L. Jacobs in 1918, leading to him purchasing the company in 1923. It was then renamed to Hertz Drive-Ur-Self System. This small car rental operation began with a dozen Model T Ford cars. Within five years, the fleet expanded to 600 vehicles—generating annual revenues of approximately US$1 million. Jacobs continued to serve as president and chief operating officer of the "Hertz Drive-Ur-Self System" until 1961.

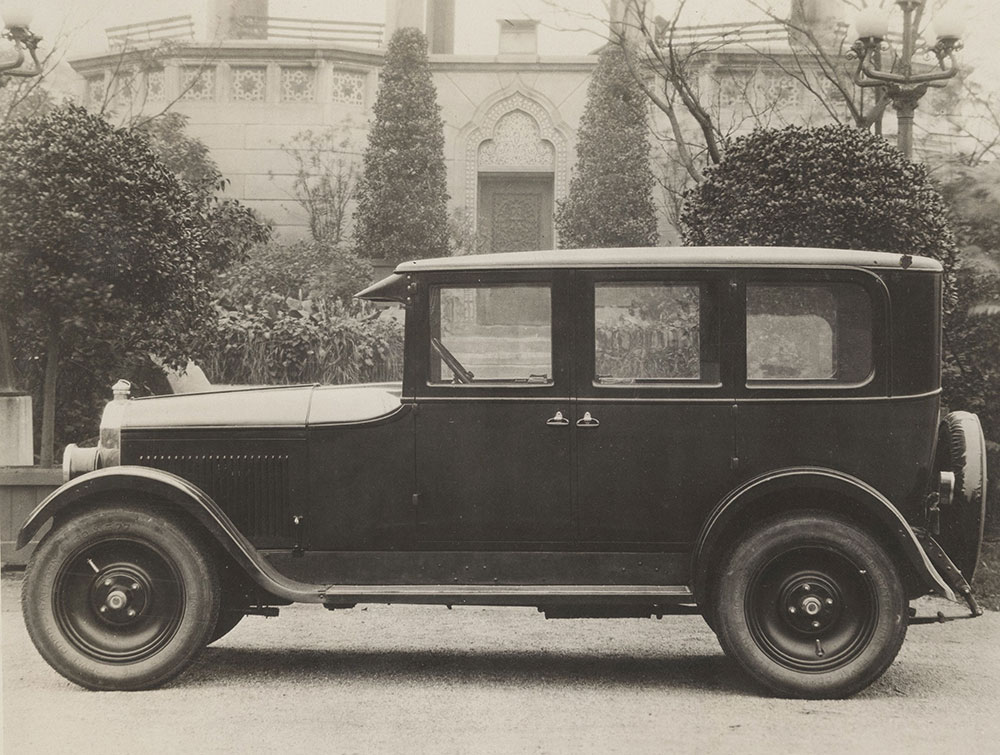
1925 Hertz Model D-1 Drive-It-Yourself Sedan

Hertz initially planned to rename cars produced by Walden W. Shaw Livery from "Shaw" to "Ambassador". Instead, the cars were built from 1924 under the "Hertz" name for the you-drive-it business. The Hertz Model D-1 was available as a tourer or sedan, selling for $1,675. Hertz continued the car hiring business, but ended production of the Model D-1 in 1927, with vehicles from that point on provided by other manufacturers. Total D-1 production was approximately 4,000 vehicles.

After three years of ownership, Hertz sold the rental car brand to General Motors Corporation in 1927. GM purchased the rest of Yellow Truck and Coach Manufacturing Company in 1943. Under the ownership of General Motors, the company released the first rental car charge card in 1926, opened its first rental car location at Chicago's Midway Airport in 1932, and introduced the first one-way rental plan in 1933. Hertz Drive-Ur-Self System expanded services to Canada in 1938 and Europe (France) in 1950.

=== Development of the corporation ===
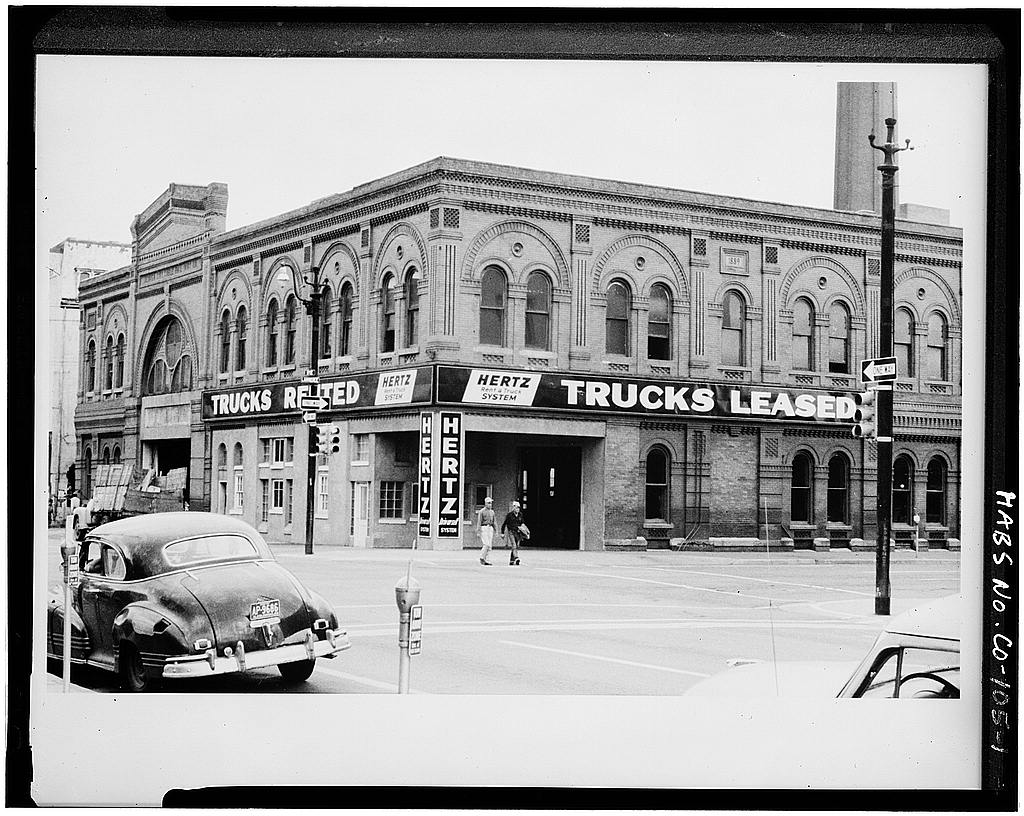
Street view of a Hertz location in Denver, Colorado in 1959

John Hertz repurchased the brand from General Motors in 1953 through his other company, The Omnibus Corporation, which he renamed to The Hertz Corporation. In 1954, its stock began trading on the New York Stock Exchange. It also purchased a New York-based truck leasing company, Metropolitan Distributors, which included a fleet of 4,000 trucks. This acquisition increased The Hertz Corporation's fleet to 15,500 trucks and 12,900 passenger cars.

During General Motors' ownership, the company had sold many local Hertz franchises to independent business entities. With the financial backing of investment bankers Lehman Brothers, led by Lehman partner and Hertz director Frank J. Manheim, Hertz initiated a buyback program for its franchises in the US, which it then expanded globally. Manheim predicted the global growth and devised the strategy that made "Hertz" a household name and led to dynamic growth in the company's market capitalization from $7 million in 1953 to $100 million in 1965.

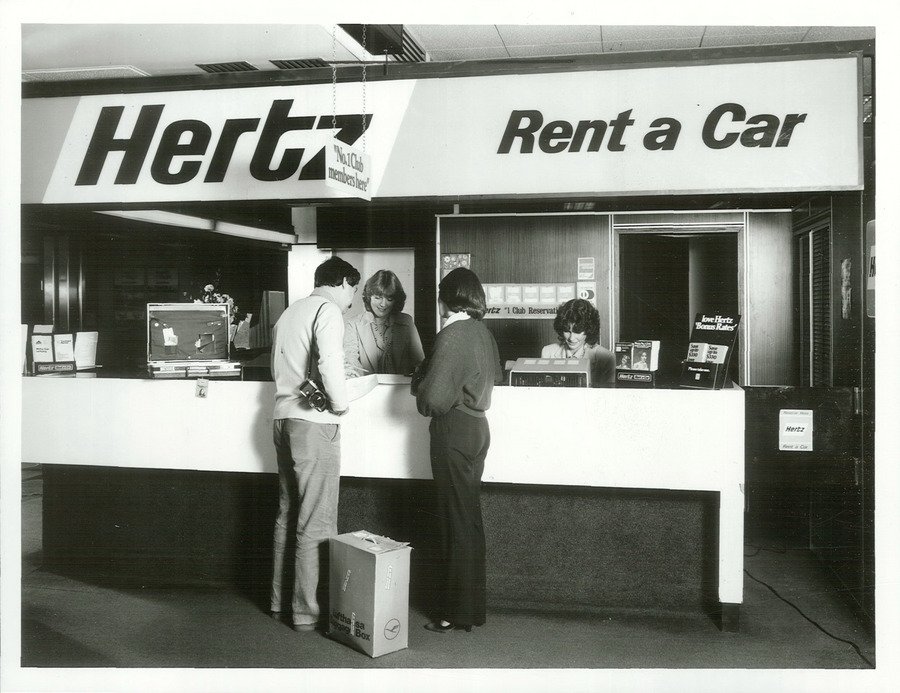
Hertz counter at Christchurch Airport, New Zealand, 1981

The company expanded to South America in 1961. In 1967, The Hertz Corporation became a subsidiary of Radio Corporation of America. In 1985, the car rental company was sold to UAL Corporation, later known as Allegis Corporation, for a cash deal of US$587.5 million. This acquisition expanded Hertz's vehicle renting and leasing, with nearly 400,000 cars and trucks in 120 countries across the globe.

In the summer of 1987, Allegis Corporation chairman and president Frank Olson announced the company would be selling Hertz due to internal changes. Park Ridge Corporation, which was owned and operated under Ford Motor Company, purchased Hertz in October 1987 for US$1.3 billion, and Hertz relocated its headquarters from Midtown Manhattan to Park Ridge, New Jersey in 1988.

In 2002, Hertz became the first international car rental company to open in China. In 2013, Hertz began partnering with China's largest car rental company, China Auto Rental. In 2016, it reduced its ownership stake but announced a continuing commercial relationship through 2023.

By the second quarter of 2005, Hertz produced about ten percent of Ford's overall pre-tax profit. However, after 18 years of ownership, the Ford Motor Company announced it would be selling the Hertz brand with the intent to focus more on building Ford cars and trucks. Private equity firms Clayton, Dubilier & Rice, The Carlyle Group, and Merrill Lynch Global Private Equity agreed to purchase all shares of common stock in Hertz for an estimated US$15 billion, including debt, and the business itself for US$5.6 billion in 2005.

The Clayton, Dubilier & Rice consortium took Hertz Global Holdings public again on the New York Stock Exchange in November 2006, and Hertz began to expand through Europe.

Hertz launched subbrand "Simply Wheelz" in September 2007 for economy-minded and leisure-market audiences. By 2008, the service expanded to airports in California, Florida, and the McCarran International Airport in Las Vegas, Nevada. Once an online reservation was made, customers were able to choose one of six types of vehicles at self-service rental kiosks. Simply Wheelz was rebranded as Advantage Rent-a-Car in the fall of 2009.

In late December 2009, Clayton, Dubilier & Rice announced the acquisition of used cars dealer British Car Auctions (BCA) from London-based equity firm Montagu Private Equity for an estimated £390 million. BCA was subsequently sold to Haversham Holdings, an investment business, without ever being integrated into Hertz.

=== Dollar Thrifty and Advantage transactions ===
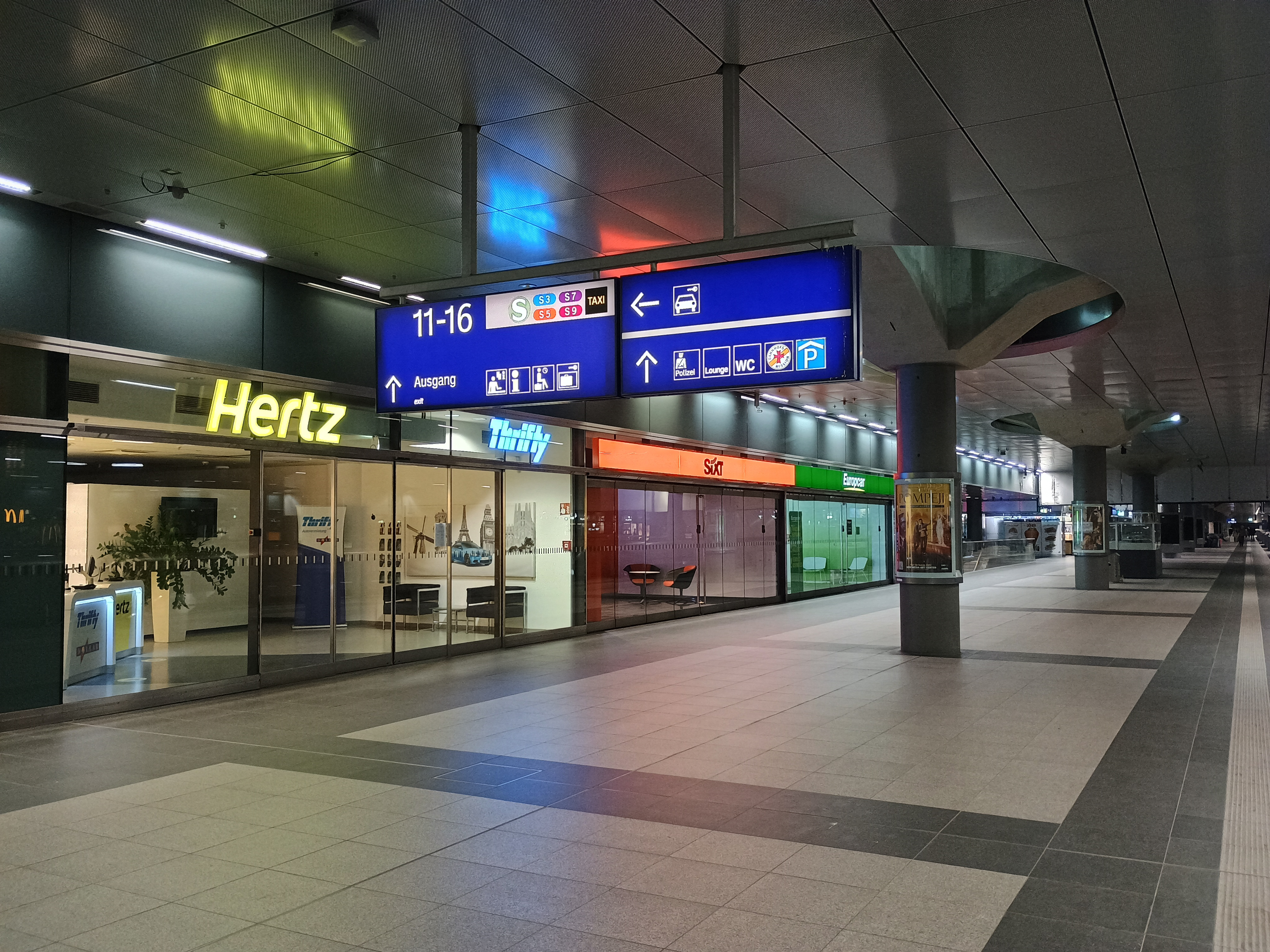
Combined Hertz/Dollar/Thrifty office at Berlin Hauptbahnhof

In November 2012, Hertz Global Holdings Chairman and CEO Mark P. Frissora announced the company's purchase of Dollar Thrifty Automotive Group, a U.S.-based car rental brand with headquarters in Tulsa, Oklahoma, for US$2.3 billion. The business transaction included Hertz paying $87.50 per share of the Dollar Thrifty stock. The deal was finalized on November 19, 2012, and resulted in a combined 10,400 locations in approximately 150 countries. Before the merge, Dollar Thrifty was the fourth-largest car rental company.

In December 2012, Hertz announced it would sell its Advantage Rent a Car unit to Franchise Services of North America and Macquarie Capital after the acquisition of Dollar Thrifty Automotive Group was finalized.

=== Modern corporate changes ===
In May 2013, Frissora and Florida Governor Rick Scott announced Hertz Global Holdings would relocate their worldwide headquarters from Park Ridge, New Jersey to Estero, Florida. Relocation to Southwest Florida was influenced by the state's travel and tourism industry, proximity to Orlando and Miami, to condense corporate offices, and to increase efficiency of Hertz Global brands. A temporary office building in Naples, Florida housed 640 employees until construction of a new facility was completed in 2015.

John P. Tague replaced Frissora as chief executive officer and president of The Hertz Corporation in November 2014.

Kathryn V. Marinello, former CEO of Stream Global Services, was appointed president and chief executive officer of The Hertz Corporation on January 2, 2017, following John Tague's retirement.

Marinello resigned as CEO on May 18, 2020, and Hertz announced that Paul Stone as new president and chief executive. Stone previously served as Hertz's executive vice president and chief retail operations officer for North America.

On October 5, 2021, Hertz announced it had named Mark Fields interim CEO and Paul Stone president and chief operations officer.

In February 2022, Stephen M. Scherr was named Chief Executive Officer of Hertz.

=== COVID-19 pandemic and bankruptcy ===
As a result of the COVID-19 pandemic, on April 30, 2020, Hertz announced that it had missed lease payments on its fleet and was seeking support from its lenders, including activist investor Carl Icahn, in an attempt to avoid bankruptcy. On May 22, 2020, the Wall Street Journal reported that Hertz was preparing to file for bankruptcy because it did not reach an agreement with top lenders. That same day, the company filed for Chapter 11 bankruptcy. Carl Icahn held 39% of Hertz's shares when it filed for bankruptcy on May 22, 2020, and he controlled three board seats. He invested a total of $2.3 billion into Hertz shares from 2014 to 2020.

Hertz financed itself mostly by taking out loans secured by its fleet of cars, and if the cars fell in value, Hertz's lenders had the right to demand an immediate payment, reducing the amount of the loan, so they were still comfortably covered by the cars’ now-lower value. Because of the crisis, used-car values and sales volumes fell right as Hertz lost most of its customers. The bankruptcy filing started a 60-day clock, during which Hertz's secured lenders must wait before they can foreclose on the 400,000 U.S. cars that were financed through such arrangements.

Despite the bankruptcy filing, Hertz announced on June 11, 2020, that it was seeking to raise up to $1 billion in new equity (with disclaimers that there is a "risk that the common stock could ultimately be worthless"). The Wall Street Journal characterized the potential stock sale as a "seemingly unprecedented move for a large bankrupt company eager to capitalize on market anomalies," as its stock price rose nearly 1000% from a low of 59 cents after its bankruptcy filing to $5.50 a share. Hertz's stock has been heavily traded by retail investors, becoming one of the most-traded stocks. Hertz sold $29 million in stock before the Securities Exchange Commission halted further sales. The stock was delisted from the New York Stock Exchange in October 2020. In December 2020, the company's UK division filed for Chapter 15 bankruptcy.

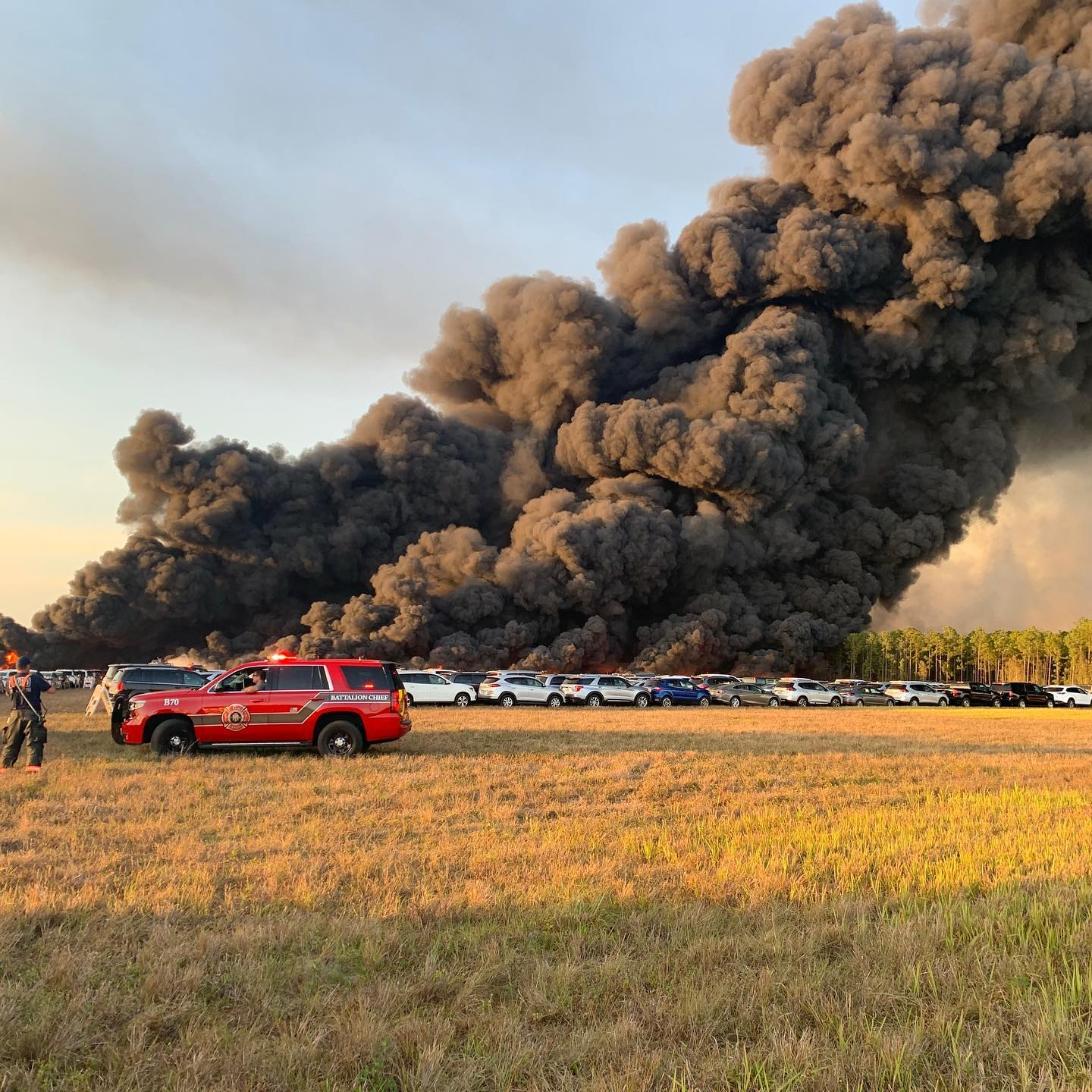
Firefighters respond to a rental car lot fire at Southwest Florida International Airport in April 2020. The fire destroyed approximately 1,200 Hertz cars.

A large fire at Southwest Florida International Airport in April 2020 destroyed approximately 1,200 Hertz cars. Multiple car rental companies, including Hertz, stored thousands of cars in a temporary storage lot on a grass field after the COVID-19 pandemic impacted the rental car business. Investigators determined that the cars caught fire after heat from a car exhaust system ignited dry grass in the field, starting a large fire that took. The fire led to the total loss of the Hertz cars and over 2,000 vehicles owned by other companies, at a total cost of over $100 million.

On July 1, 2021, Hertz emerged from Chapter 11 bankruptcy and changed its ticker symbol from HTZGQ to HTZZ.

In October 2021, Mark Fields was named interim CEO of Hertz with a focus on forward looking investments. On October 25, 2021, Fields announced that Hertz will buy 100,000 Tesla vehicles citing his goal of fleet electrification and that Tesla is the "only manufacturer that can produce EVs at scale". In November 2021, the company went public again on the Nasdaq with symbol HTZ. In February 2022, Stephen M. Scherr was named CEO of Hertz. Scherr stepped down in March 2024 and was replaced by Gil West.

=== Accusing customers of car theft ===
Since 2019, Hertz has been embroiled in a mounting controversy where numerous reports have emerged of Hertz falsely accusing its customers of having stolen automobiles which were under an active rental agreement. Many of the victims report having been arrested in full view of their families and at gunpoint. Victims reported being jailed for months before being released, resulting in loss of licensure, professional credentials and employment while their falsely filed felonies languish through the system, depriving them of income and their rights. Victims also reported that Hertz claims that outdated computer systems are to blame, local and corporate systems "not communicating correctly", but victim profiles have indicated that these false arrests are more likely to happen to minority groups.

In February 2022, a judge forced Hertz to reveal that it reports about 3,365 of its customers to the police every year for theft. Hertz claims that such instances are only a "rare situation" as this is only 0.014% of their 25 million annual transactions in the United States. According to reports, 47 customers have filed lawsuits against Hertz for misreporting cars as stolen resulting in many false arrests and imprisonment. In December 2022, Hertz announced the settlement of 364 pending claims relating to vehicle theft reporting, bringing resolution to more than 95% of its pending theft reporting claims. In this settlement, Hertz agreed to pay approximately $168 million by year-end to resolve these disputes.

== Car rental locations and operation ==
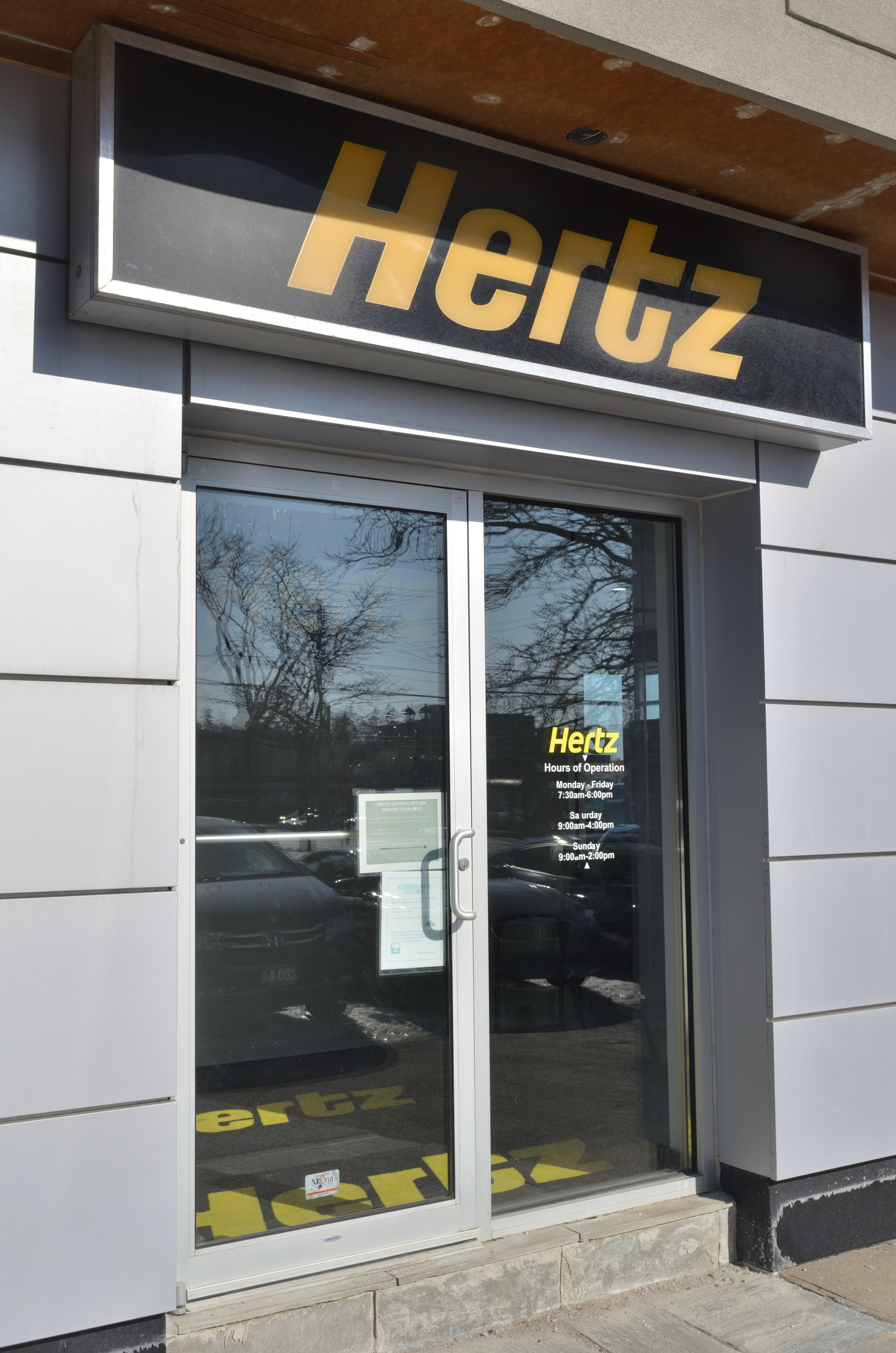
Hertz location in Richmond Hill, Ontario

Hertz has approximately 12,000 corporate and franchisee locations in 160 countries throughout North America, Europe, Latin America, Africa, Asia, Australia, the Caribbean, the Middle East and New Zealand.

=== History of franchising ===
Wilford Gwilliam of Overland West purchased a portion of Hertz franchise in 1941. Overland West is the largest Hertz franchise licensee in North America, operating 27 car rental and four car sales locations in eight states. Gwilliam sold it to Devere J. Sparrow, who led the organization until selling it to his son-in-law, Jerry H. Petersen, in 1976. As the current owner, president and CEO, Petersen oversees franchises and employees.

== Rental fleet ==
The Hertz rental car fleet has consisted of a variety of vehicle manufacturers, ranging from BYD, Mercedes, Infiniti, Cadillac, Land Rover, BMW, Porsche, Jaguar, Mazda, Volvo, Toyota, Jeep, and Lincoln, along with various others. By December 2012, the company had over 490,000 cars in the United States. As of 2014, 78 percent of Hertz's fleet includes vehicles that reach 28 miles per gallon or more on the highway.

=== Specialty cars ===
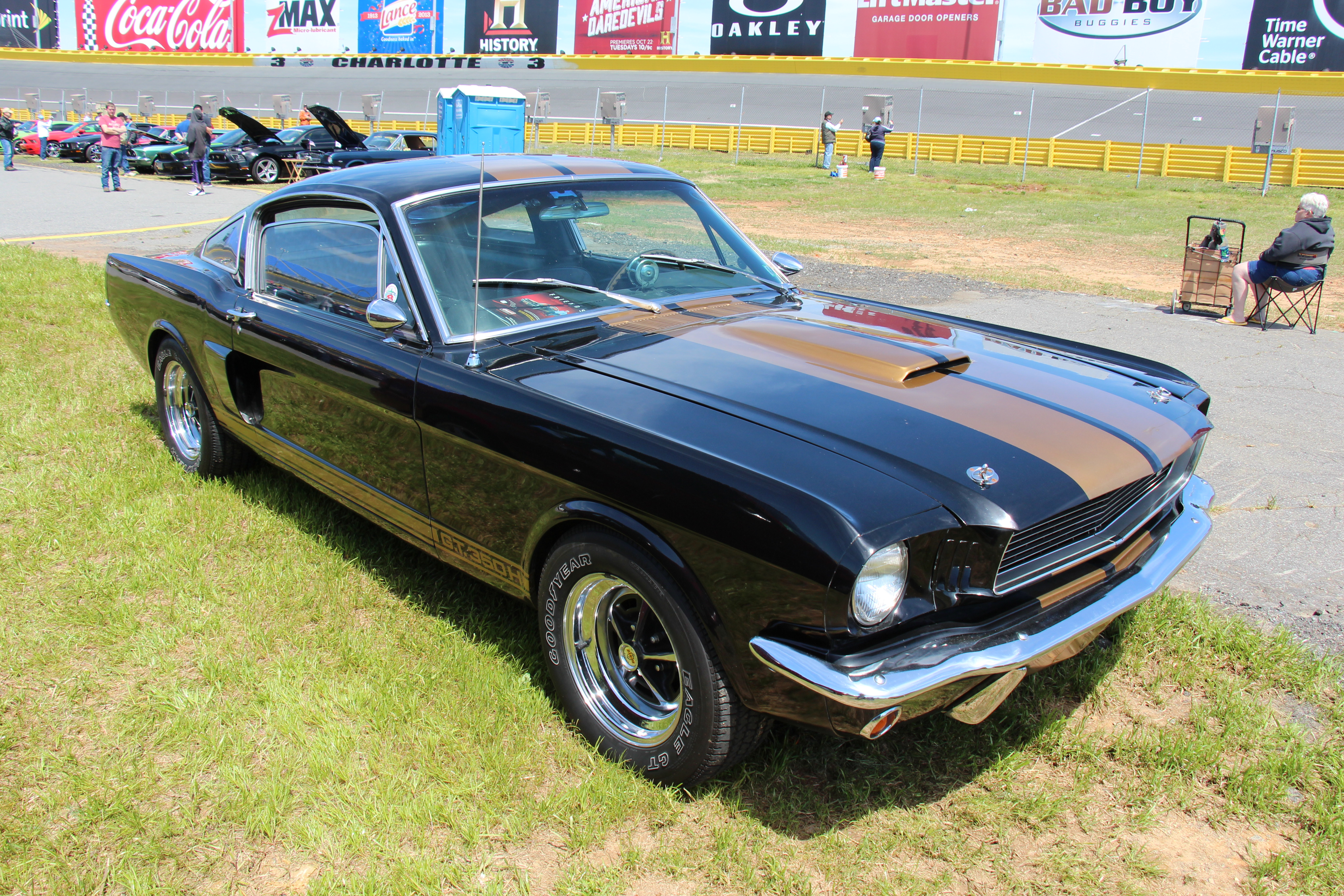
1966 Shelby GT350-H on display at the Charlotte Motor Speedway

In 1966, Hertz engaged racing and automotive designer Carroll Shelby to develop an exclusive version of his modified Ford Mustang. The objective was to attract more customers to Hertz and the Hertz fleet would tempt car renters to buy a Mustang or a Shelby-Mustang. One thousand GT350H Mustangs were built as rental cars, although urban legend also maintains that many were missing original engines when returned. The "Rent-a-Racer" program was available in selected locations during the late 1960s for a limited time. The fleet has included Corvettes, Jaguar XK-Es, and AMC AMXs.

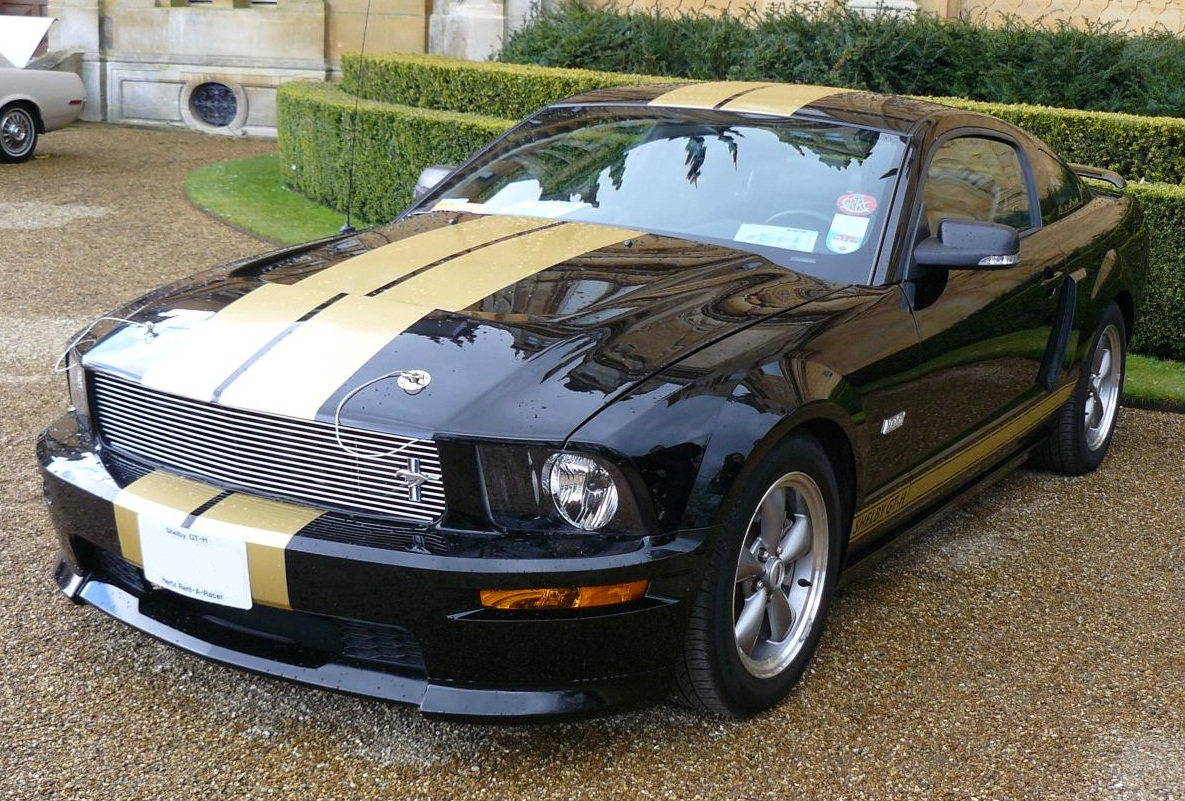
2006 Shelby GT-H

In 2006, Hertz partnered with Shelby to rent specially-modified Ford Mustang GT-H Coupes as a tribute to the original 1966 Ford Mustang Shelby GT350-H. These 500 cars in 2006 were followed by convertibles in 2007. In 2008, Hertz began to rent modified Chevrolet Corvette (C6) "ZH-Z" Coupes, followed by convertibles in 2009.

Hertz reintroduced the program in 2016, and includes vehicles such as Hendrick Motorsports-modified Chevrolet Corvette (C7) Stingray Z/06 and Chevrolet Camaro SS and ZL-1, and a Shelby-modified Ford Mustang GT.

=== New technologies ===
In 2000, Hertz introduced SiriusXM Satellite Radio to its North America rental fleet.

In 2007, the company began testing hourly car rentals at three locations in New York City. It launched a global carsharing service under the name Connect by Hertz in December 2008, serving customers who paid a fee to rent cars by the hour in Park Ridge, New York, Orlando, London, Paris, and Sydney. Later branded as Hertz on Demand and Hertz 24/7, operation in the United States ceased in September 2015.

In 2009, it began testing a photo system to record damage to its rental cars.

It introduced ExpressRent kiosks at various rental locations in November 2011. This was the first introduction of large-scale car rental kiosks in the United States that used a live agent through video chat.

=== The Green Collection ===
Hertz launched its Green Collection of rental cars in September 2006. This fleet of environmentally friendly vehicles has included the Toyota Prius, Ford Fusion, Buick LaCrosse, Toyota Camry, and Hyundai Sonata. In the US vehicles within this group feature Environmental Protection Agency (EPA) highway fuel efficiency ratings of 28 mpg_{‑US} (8.4 L/100 km; 33.6 mpg_{‑imp}) on the highway. Different models and different standards apply in other markets. The Green Collection was introduced in Singapore in 2014.

=== Electric vehicle rental fleet ===
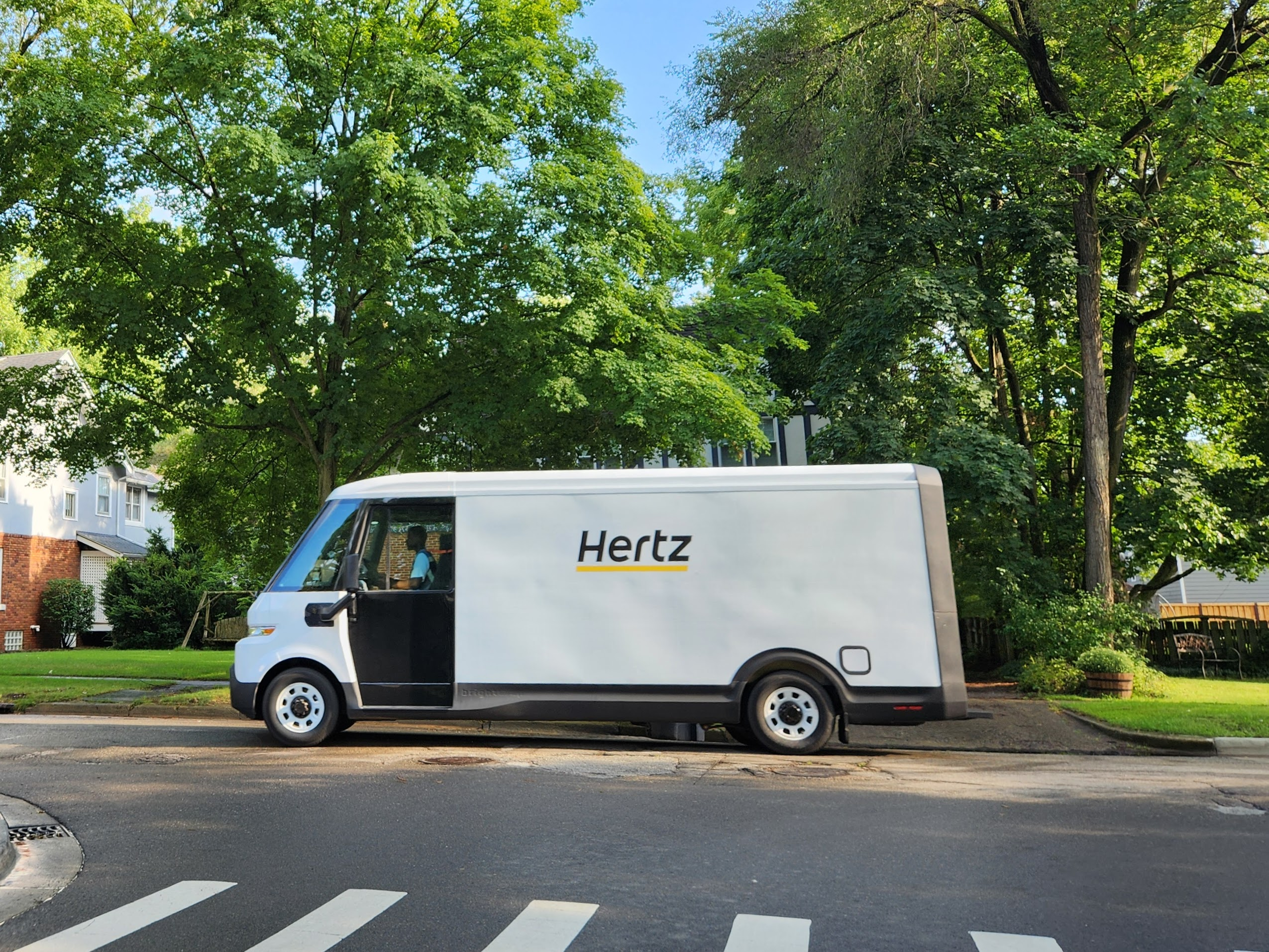
Hertz electric Chevrolet BrightDrop van in Ann Arbor, Michigan

In October 2021, Hertz announced it was investing in electric vehicles with the purchase of 100,000 Teslas, primarily Tesla Model 3 sedans. In March 2022, Tesla Model Y crossovers were added to the order. The Hertz Tesla fleet will have access to Tesla’s supercharger network as Hertz develops their own vehicle charging infrastructure.

Hertz and Uber announced a partnership in October 2022 where Hertz will offer up to 50,000 Tesla vehicles for rent to Uber drivers.

In April 2022, Hertz announced its intent to purchase up to 65,000 Polestar 2 vehicles over 5 years from electric carmaker Polestar.

In September 2022, Hertz unveiled a deal with General Motors to purchase up to 175,000 electric vehicles from Chevrolet, Buick, GMC, Cadillac, and BrightDrop over a period of five years.

As part of its investment in electrification, Hertz announced in September 2022 a memorandum of understanding (MOU) for the development of a national network of EV charging stations powered by bp pulse, bp’s global electrification and charging solution brand.

In February 2023, Hertz stated that it plans to make a quarter of its total vehicle fleet electric.

In January 2024, Hertz announced plans to sell a third of its EV fleet through outlets such as Auto Trader and EV.com, and to reinvest in petrol/gas-powered cars due to weak demand and high repair costs for its battery-powered vehicles. The company placed much of the blame on Tesla, whose prices cuts forced the company to write down the value of its EVS more quickly than anticipated, and Hertz's CEO, Stephen Scherr, said Tesla was less willing than other automakers to give volume discounts on replacement parts. At the time of the announcement, Hertz offered EVs from Tesla as well as GM, Kia, Polestar, and Volkswagen. Scherr also cited how often EVs were involved in accidents at higher rates than other cars, with consumers less experienced in operating them. He noted, however, this was a partial reversal, not a complete abandonment of its fleet electrification. Analysts suggested the move would hurt the second-hand market for used EVs and might discourage some consumers from purchasing these vehicles. Scherr also said that the decision was based on declining resale values of its EV fleet affecting the price that Hertz could recoup after the fleet's lifetime and that dropping EVs form the company's catalogue was "the consequence of a material price decline in Teslas and EVs more generally." It would follow with an announcement in February 2024 that it was pausing purchases of Polestar vehicles, citing a loss in the value of EVs.

=== Heavy equipment rentals ===
Hertz opened a heavy equipment rental division in 1965, the Hertz Equipment Rental Corporation, with its first location in Houston, Texas and headquarters in Park Ridge, New Jersey. Herc Rentals became an independently publicly traded company called Herc Rentals on July 1, 2016. The company is headquartered in Bonita Springs, Florida. Herc Rentals wasn't affected by its former parent's bankruptcy on May 22, 2020.

== Advertising ==
=== Signage on the Texas School Book Depository ===
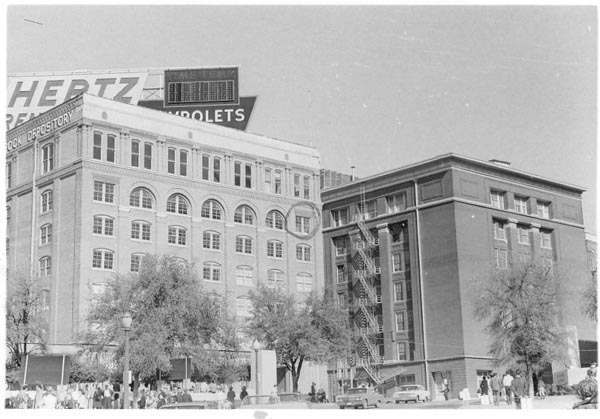
Hertz advertisement on the Texas School Book Depository building, photographed in 1963

In December 1959, a 100 foot long by 23 foot high Hertz Rent-A-Car advertising sign was diagonally installed on the roof of the Texas School Book Depository in Texas in the United States. The sign included the words "HERTZ RENT A CAR" (red text on yellow background) and "CHEVROLETS" (yellow text on black background) made up of 128 metal plates, and an electronic display that alternately told the time and temperature (one of first billboards to do so). The building was Lee Harvey Oswald's vantage point from where he assassinated United States President John F. Kennedy on November 22, 1963. Many witnesses would recall the approximate time (12:30) of the assassination from reading the digital clock on the billboard. The aging sign was removed in 1979, and its metal plates are part of the collection of the Sixth Floor Museum at Dealey Plaza.

=== Let Hertz Put You in the Driver's Seat ===
In 1959, the advertising firm of Norman, Craig & Kummel (NCK) was selected as the new advertising agency for Hertz. NCK developed the slogan "Hertz puts you in the driver's seat", which was first used commercially in September 1959. NCK changed the wording to "Let Hertz put you in the driver's seat" by October 1959. Popular a cappella quartet The Hi-Lo's sang the Hertz song for the commercials. Hertz used the line in the early 1960s in print, signs, and television. The series is listed as number 65 in the top 100 advertising campaigns of the 20th century by Advertising Age magazine.

=== O.J. Simpson ===
In the 1980s and 1990s, former football player O. J. Simpson appeared as a spokesperson in Hertz ads. Simpson's place in advertising is said to have sparked black athletes being featured in film and television. One spot from the mid-1970s showed Simpson, at that point an American football player, running through an airport terminal, dressed in business attire, leaping over rows of seats to get to his Hertz rental car. A woman yelled, "Go, O. J., Go!" The tagline of the ad, as spoken by Simpson, was "Hertz, the superstar in rent-a-car". The ad campaign was highly successful for the first five years it was used, and helped to propel Simpson to get high-profile sponsorship deals with other companies. Through the 1980s and 1990s, Simpson appeared with golfer Arnold Palmer and actress Jamie Lee Curtis. After Simpson's Ford Bronco chase and his murder trial, Hertz cut all ties to him.
