= Car rental =

Vehicle rental without drivers

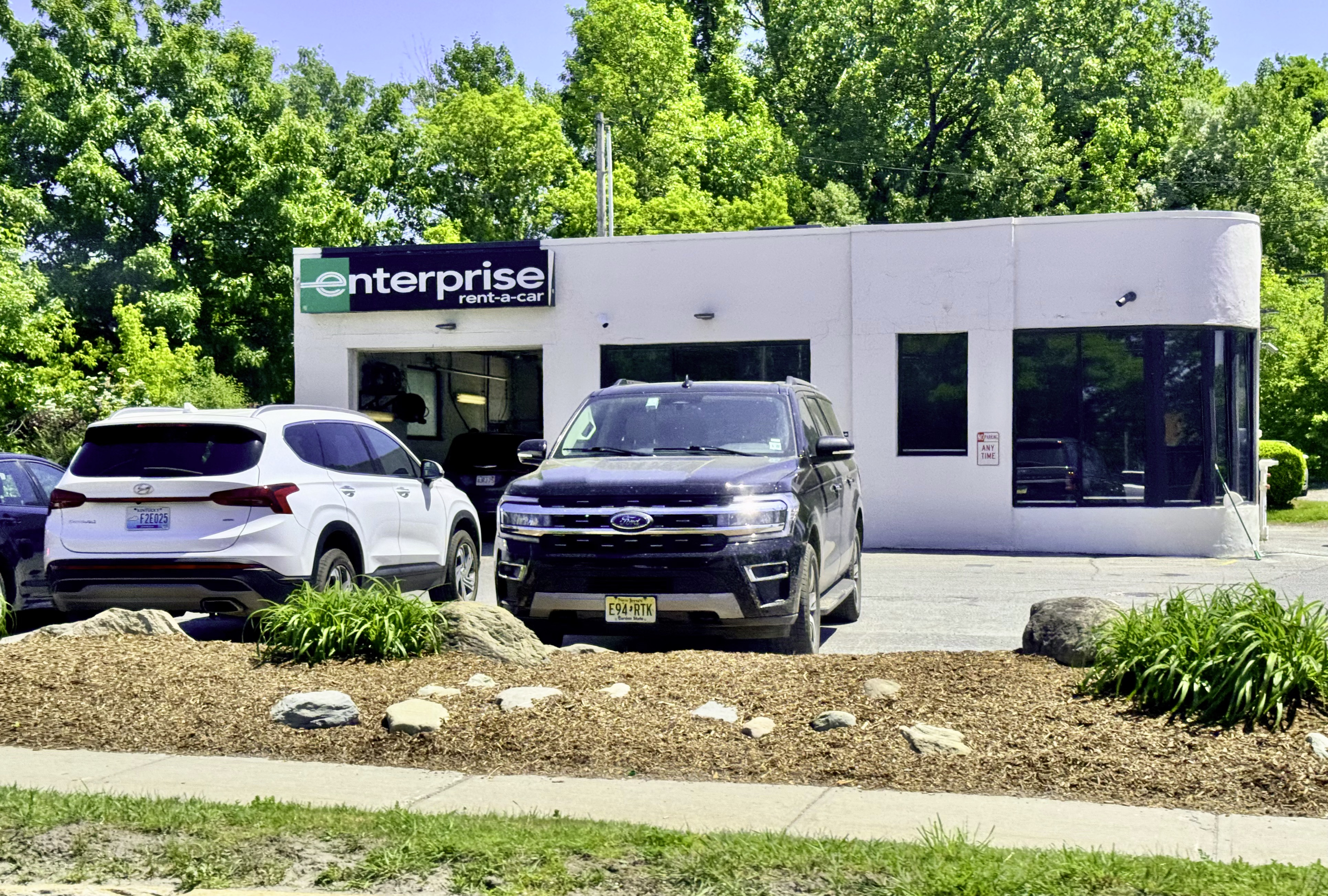
Enterprise Rent-A-Car in South Burlington, Vermont

A car rental, hire car or car hire agency is a company that rents automobiles for short periods of time to the public, generally ranging from a few hours to a few weeks. It is often organized with numerous local branches (which allow a user to return a vehicle to a different location), and primarily located near airports or busy city areas and often complemented by a website allowing online reservations.

Car rental agencies primarily serve people who require a temporary vehicle, for example, those who do not own their own car, travelers who are out of town, or owners of damaged or destroyed vehicles who are awaiting repair or insurance compensation. Car rental agencies may also serve the self-moving industry needs, by renting vans or trucks, and in certain markets, other types of vehicles such as motorcycles or scooters may also be offered.

Alongside the basic rental of a vehicle, car rental agencies typically also offer extra products such as insurance, global positioning system (GPS) navigation systems, entertainment systems, mobile phones, portable WiFi and child safety seats.

== History ==
The earliest known example of cars being offered for rent dates back to 1906. The German company Sixt was established in 1912 under the name Sixt Autofahrten und Selbstfahrer (Sixt Car Cruises and Self Drivers).

Joe Saunders of Omaha, Nebraska first started with only one borrowed Model T Ford in 1916, but by 1917, his Ford Livery Company was renting out 18 Model Ts at 10 cents per mile. The company name became Saunders Drive-It-Yourself System and then Saunders System. By 1926, Saunders had expanded to 56 cities. Saunders' company was bought by Avis in 1955.

An early competitor to Saunders was Walter L. Jacobs, whose Chicago-based Rent-a-Car opened in 1918 with twelve Ford Model T's. The company was bought in 1923 by John Hertz.

In Britain, car rental started with Godfrey Davis, established in 1920, and bought by Europcar in 1981.

The sector expanded rapidly in the US; in 1926, the American Driveurself Association assembled over 1200 delegates in Chicago.

The growth in travel after World War II led to the establishment of several well known international companies, including National Car Rental (1947), Europcar (1949), Enterprise Rent-A-Car (1957), Thrifty Rent A Car (1958), and Budget Rent a Car (1958).

== Business models ==
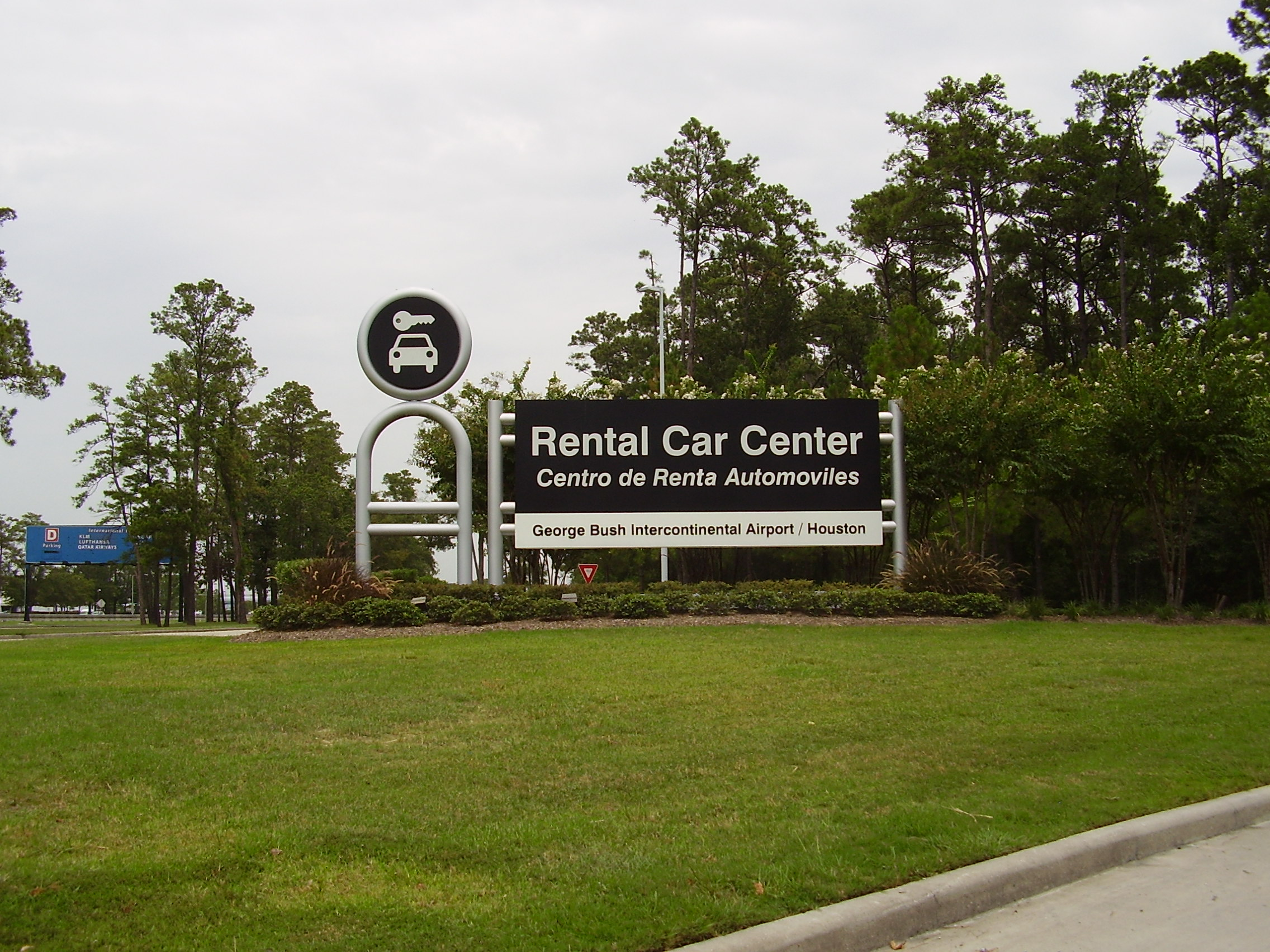
The Rental Car Center at George Bush Intercontinental Airport

Car rental companies operate by purchasing or leasing a number of fleet vehicles and renting them to their customers for a fee. Rental fleets can be structured in several ways – they can be owned outright (these are known as 'risk vehicles' because the car rental operator is taking a risk on how much the vehicle will be sold for when it is removed from service), they can be leased, or they can be owned under a guaranteed buy-back program arranged directly through a manufacturer or manufacturer's financial arm (these are known as 'repurchase vehicles' because the manufacturer outlines the exact price of original sale and of repurchase at the end of a defined term).

In the UK, the registration of rental cars can be concealed by using unfamiliar initials or subsidiaries, which can increase the resale value via manufacturer or third-party dealers. In North America, it is common to see rental companies with their own branded second-hand car dealers where the ex-rental stock is sold directly to the public. Alternatively, auctions are often used in the United States and with the advent of digital platforms, rental cars have increasingly sold the vehicles directly to new and used car dealers bypassing the auction channels.

== Types of vehicles ==
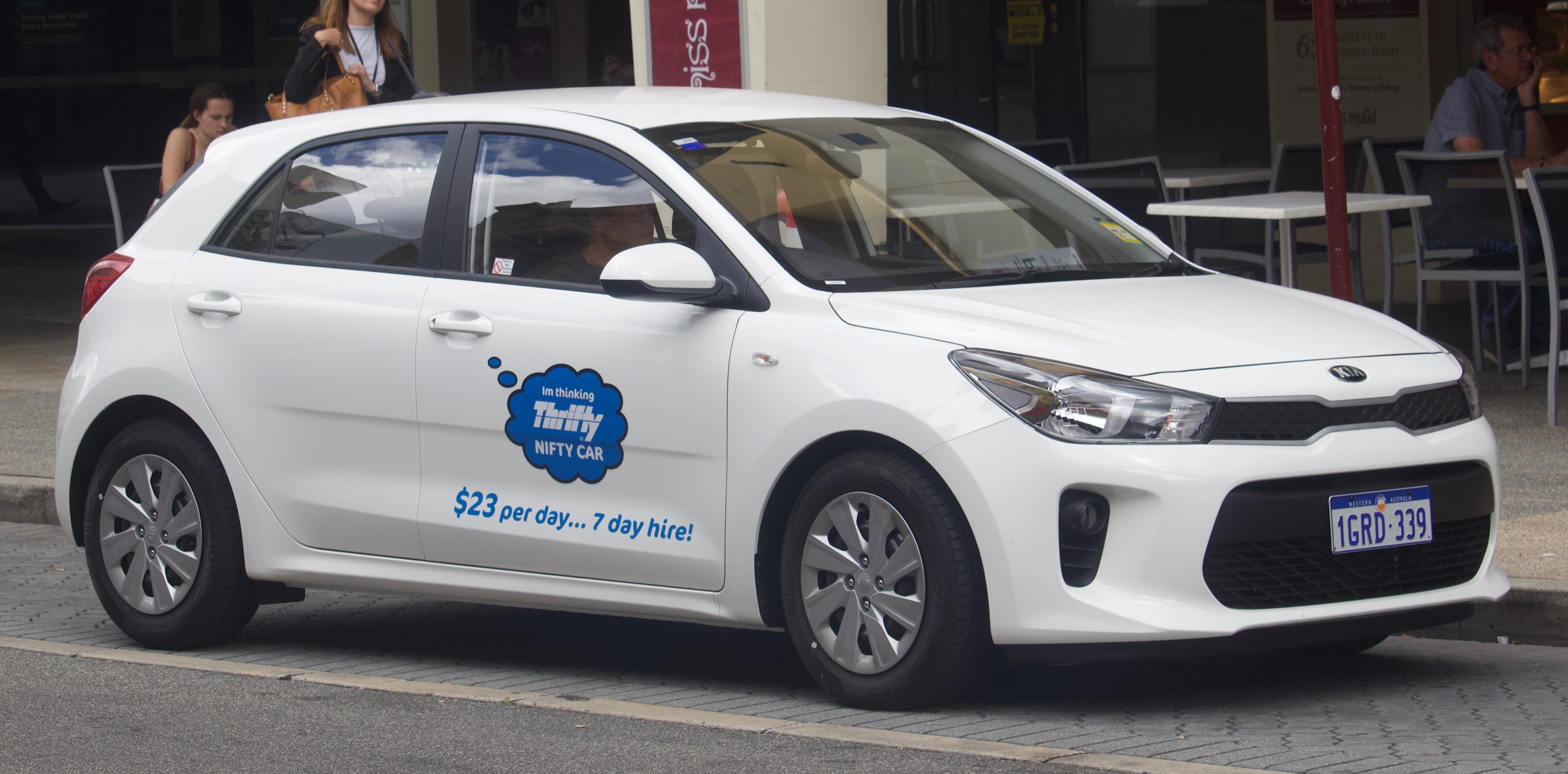
Kia Rio rental car of Thrifty

Most car rental offices offer a range of vehicle sizes to suit a variety of budgets and space requirements and some additionally offer specialized vehicles to suit its location such as convertibles, prestige models, hybrid/electric vehicles, or SUVs and passenger vans. At major airports or in larger cities, some independent car rental agencies offer high-end vehicles for rent. Some specialized companies offer older vehicles at reduced prices.

To allow for a uniform classification and easy comparison of car rental prices, the Association of Car Rental Industry Systems and Standards (ACRISS) has developed the ACRISS Car Classification Code coding system. This describes the size, door count, gearbox type (manual/automatic), and whether the car is air-conditioned, encoded into four letters. The first letter in the Acriss Code represents the general classification of the vehicle (e.g. Mini, Economy, Compact etc.). The second letter specifies the vehicle variant on offer (e.g. 4 Door, Estate, Convertible, SUV etc.). The third letter is generally used to specify the transmission type, although it can also be used to describe how many wheels drive the vehicle, and the fourth letter describes the fuel type and whether the vehicle has air conditioning or not.

Additional classifications based on seat numbers and trunk volume were also set by the Belgian Rent a Car association in order to provide a unified system for assessing the car types in online reservation systems and airline global distribution systems.

== Rental conditions ==
Car rentals are subject to many conditions which vary from one country to another and from one company to another. Generally the vehicle must be returned in the same condition it was rented in, and often must not exceed mileage restrictions, otherwise, extra fees may be incurred.

For insurance reasons, some companies stipulate a minimum and/or maximum rental age. In some cases, the minimum age for rental can be as high as 25, even in countries where the minimum legal age to hold a driver's license is much lower, e.g. 14,15,16 or 17 in the United States. It is not uncommon for there to be a young driver surcharge for all drivers aged under 25. On average, most car rental companies will only to rent to drivers who are at least 20 or 21 depending on the company. The companies Hertz, Dollar Car Rental, and Thrifty have a minimum age of 20. Alamo, Enterprise, Avis, and all other reputable companies have a minimum age of 21. Certain luxury vehicles may be restricted to those 30+. The US states of New York and Michigan are the only ones who mandate via state law that rental car companies cannot refuse service on the grounds of age if the customer is at least 18 years of age or older. In addition, some companies will rent to 18 and 19 year olds if they are military or government personnel.

In all cases, a valid driver's license is required in order to rent a vehicle, and some countries require an International Driving Permit (IDP).

The majority of car rental companies require the use of a credit card to charge additional fees should a defect be found with the car on its return or for road tolls, motoring related fines, or missing fuel. In lieu of a credit card, some companies require a large cash deposit. Some companies permit a debit card for deposits, typically with proof of a round-trip travel ticket, e.g. an airline, bus, or train ticket.

== Insurance/waivers ==
Although frequently not explicitly stated, US car rental companies are required by respective state law to provide minimum liability coverage, except in California and Arizona, where the driver is solely responsible. This covers costs to a third party in the event of an accident. In most states, it is illegal to drive a car without liability coverage. The rental car companies maintain liability insurance on their vehicles; however, some companies will charge for this, should you not provide your own insurance. As an example, in Maryland, the minimal level of liability coverage is $20,000 for bodily injury and $15,000 for property damage.

It is typical, when renting a car, to be offered various forms of supplemental insurance and/or damage waivers as an optional extra at additional cost. If you possess car insurance, it often applies to rentals as well. Additionally, numerous credit cards offer protection against theft and damage when used for payment. Before considering additional coverage at the rental agency, verify both your existing insurance and credit card benefits. There are several types of coverage:

- Loss Damage Waiver (LDW) - covers the cost of damage to the rental vehicle, up to the full value of the vehicle, in the event of an accident. Typically LDW covers 100% of costs without a deductible additional fees. Note that LDW/CDW coverage is not insurance and does not offer the same coverage product as a damage insurance policy.
- Collision Damage Waiver (CDW) - Generally covers the costs of damage from a moving accident. As the name suggests, the non-collision based damage is often not covered. In many cases, in the event of an accident, a fee or deductible applies.
- Supplemental Liability Insurance (SLI) – a product often sold in the U.S. which provides coverage in the event of an accident causing bodily injury or property damage to someone other than the renter and passengers.
- Personal Accident Insurance (PAI) – covers medical costs and accidental death for the renter and passengers in the event of an accident during the rental.
- Personal Effects Coverage (PEC) – insures against risk of loss or damage to the personal belongings of the renter (and sometimes the members of the renter's family while traveling with the renter) during the period of the rental.
- Excess Insurance – Collision damage waiver, Theft and Third Party Liability coverage are often included in car rental prices in Europe, Africa, and Australasia. There is almost always an excess on these (also referred to as Super CDW, Non-Waiver, or Deductible), which involves an amount of money customers must pay in the event of damage, to discourage drivers from making small claims. A higher excess usually results in a lower upfront insurance cost for customers, but if damage occurs costing less than the excess to repair, then there is little incentive for customers to claim, benefiting the insurer. Excess insurance (also known as excess reduction, or damage liability waiver) is a secondary insurance which covers the cost of that excess in the event of a claim. Car-rental companies in Europe, South America, and Australasia will generally offer this cover as an opt-in secondary insurance, though third-party insurance companies also sell excess coverage for hire cars, which may offer greater protection than standard coverage.

In the U.S., the sale of these supplemental insurance/waiver products may be regulated by each state's insurance department, and a special limited license may be required by the rental company in order to sell them. The specific coverage offered can differ substantially, depending on the state or country in which the car is rented.

== Criticism ==
=== Tourist rental cars ===
When cars are rented out to tourists, it adds vehicles on the roads. This can be an issue in countries already struggling with traffic congestion. When traffic congestion occurs, it may itself have a negative effect on tourist satisfaction.

== See also ==
- Consolidated rental car facility
- Carsharing
- Damage waiver
- European Tourism Manifesto
- Ecotax
- Ecoleasing
- Traffic congestion
- Tourist tax
- Peer-to-peer carsharing
- Vehicle leasing
- Personal public transport – Network of private self-drive rentals

== Bibliography ==
- Harris Saunders, Top up or down?: The origin and development of the automobile and truck renting and leasing industry--since 1916, 1985
