= Calabasas Film Festival =

U.S. independent film festival

- Location: Calabasas, California, United States
- Founded: 2014
- Language: English
- Website: calabasasfilmfestival.com

The Calabasas Film Festival is an independent film festival that screens approximately 40 films each year. It is held in Calabasas, California , The Edwards Grand Palace, The Commons at Calabasas and Viewpoint School. It takes place over the course of a week in September. During the week of the festival, there are screenings, Q & A's, and filmmaker workshops throughout.

The festival connects the local community and all lovers of film and television over selected film premieres, cocktail hours and after-parties spotlighting entertainment, local wines, and culinary arts.

It is co-directed and co-founded by sisters Kelley and Nicole Fries, and the whole team are women. The Calabasas Film Festival supports young talent by dedicating a day to feature local high school students who submitted their own films for review by industry professionals.

== History ==
The festival is a non profit based on student screenings and events that has major film premieres, student films, and documentaries that include a line-up of curated films of all genres.

The Inaugural Calabasas Film festival was held in September 2014 and included the US debut of the major film The Equalizer (film) starring, Denzel Washington and Chloë Grace Moretz. Film producers were in attendance and had a Q&A following the film's screening.

In 2015, the festival welcomed Colin Hanks for his directorial debut of All Things Must Pass, the story about the rise and fall of Tower Records. Other screenings have included: Marauders (2016 film), starring Bruce Willis, Manchild: The Schea Cotton Story, and The Birth of a Nation (2016 film) directed and produced by Nate Parker.
