= Gigi Caruso =

American businessperson and hearing loss advocate

- Born: 2000 (age 25–26)
- Education: University of Southern California
- Occupations: Businessperson, hearing loss advocate
- Father: Rick Caruso
- Relatives: Justin Caruso (brother)

Gianna "Gigi" Caruso (born 2000) is an American businessperson and an advocate for people with hearing loss. She cofounded a swimwear company, Gigi C, in 2017 and advocated for the passage of the Let California Kids Hear Act in 2019.

== Life ==
Caruso was born in 2000 to former swimsuit model and fashion designer Tina Caruso and businessman Rick Caruso. She was diagnosed with bilateral hearing loss at birth and fitted with hearing aids at the age of three months. Caruso attended speech therapy two to three times a week through middle school. When she was fourteen, her ability to hear and communicate improved when she was fitted with a Phonak Lyric hearing aid. She is an advocate for children with hearing loss. Alongside her parents, she advocated for the Let California Kids Hear Act (Assembly Bill 598) which was introduced to the assembly in 2019.

In 2017, Caruso cofounded the swimwear and activewear company, Gigi C, with her mother. The company is a direct-to-consumer brand. By 2019, she was an influencer on Instagram and a fashion businessperson.

Caruso attended the University of Southern California. graduating in 2021. She was a member of Kappa Kappa Gamma.
