= Caruso (company) =

US real estate company

- Company type: Private
- Industry: Real estate development
- Founded: 1987; 39 years ago
- Founder: Rick Caruso
- Headquarters: Los Angeles, California, U.S.
- Key people: Corinne Verdery (CEO)
- Website: Caruso.com

Caruso, formerly Caruso Affiliated Holdings, LLC, is one of the largest privately held real estate companies in the United States. It was founded by Rick Caruso in 1987, with Corinne Verdery as its CEO since 2022. Caruso has a portfolio of retail and mixed-use properties in Southern California, including ones in Los Angeles, Glendale, Calabasas, Pacific Palisades, Marina Del Rey, Encino and Thousand Oaks.

== Properties ==
The company provides real estate development services in Southern California. It also develops parks, promenades, fountains, and plazas integrated with a retail environment; mixed-use developments that feature a blend of shopping, dining, and entertainment with residential living; shopping centers; outdoor retail and dining destinations that feature shops and restaurants; and lifestyle centers that offer casual living, dining, and shopping features.

Caruso develops, owns, and manages properties such as:

- The Grove at Farmers Market (Los Angeles)
- Americana at Brand (Glendale, CA)
- The Commons at Calabasas (Calabasas, CA)
- Palisades Village (Pacific Palisades, CA)
- The Promenade at Westlake (Westlake Village, CA)
- The Waterside Marina Del Rey (Marina Del Rey)
- Encino Marketplace (Encino, CA)
- Village at Moorpark (Thousand Oaks, CA)
- The Lakes at Thousand Oaks (Thousand Oaks, CA)
- 8500 Burton Way (Los Angeles)

== Awards ==
Caruso properties have won awards for design and development, including the 1997 Golden Nugget Grand Award for the Promenade at Westlake, in the Best Commercial Project for Retail category; the Urban Land Institute’s Award for Excellence for The Commons at Calabasas in 1999 and The Grove at Farmers Market in 2003; and ICSC's Gold Award in the 2009 United States Design and Development Award Competition for the Americana at Brand.
