= Americana at Brand =

Lifestyle center in Glendale, California

The Americana at Brand
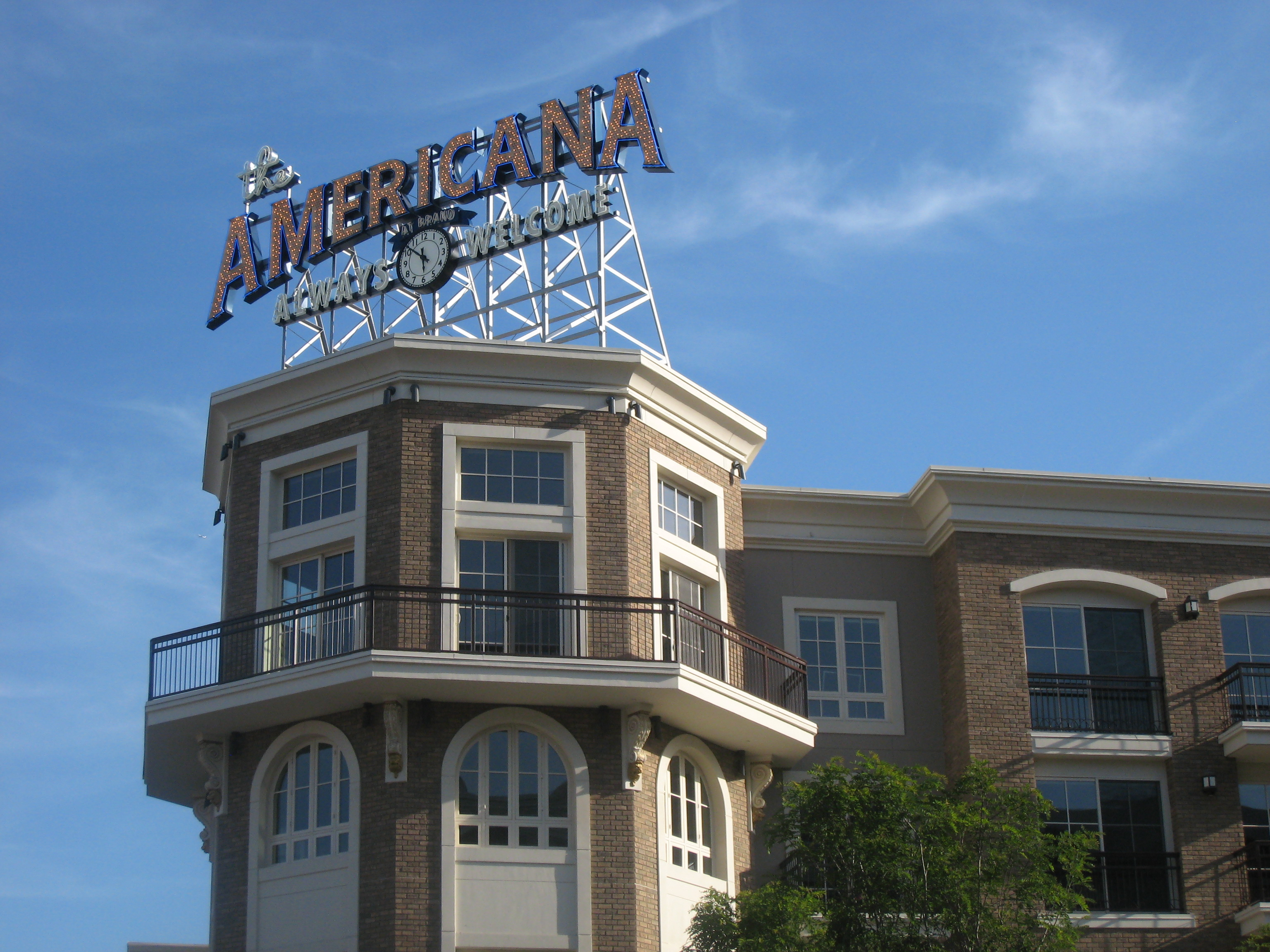
- Americana signage

General information
- Location: Glendale, California, 889 Americana Way; Glendale, California 91210
- Coordinates: 34°08′38″N 118°15′23″W
- Construction started: 2006
- Opened: May 2, 2008
- Cost: US$400 million+
- Owner: Caruso Affiliated

Technical details
- Floor count: 4

Design and construction
- Architecture firm: Caruso Affiliated; CREO Industrial Arts; Romero Thorsen Design
- Developer: Caruso Affiliated

Other information
- Number of stores: 82
- Number of anchors: 6
- Number of rooms: 242 apartments; 100 condominiums
- Number of restaurants: 32

Website
- americanaatbrand.com

The Americana at Brand is a lifestyle center in Glendale, California. The center features anchor stores Nordstrom and Barnes & Noble.

The property was built and is owned and operated by Los Angeles businessman Rick J. Caruso and his company Caruso Affiliated. It was named for Leslie Coombs Brand, a real estate developer who developed Glendale.

Caruso Affiliated has built and operates many other projects, including The Grove at Farmers Market in Los Angeles. The complex comprises 100 condominiums and 242 luxury apartments.

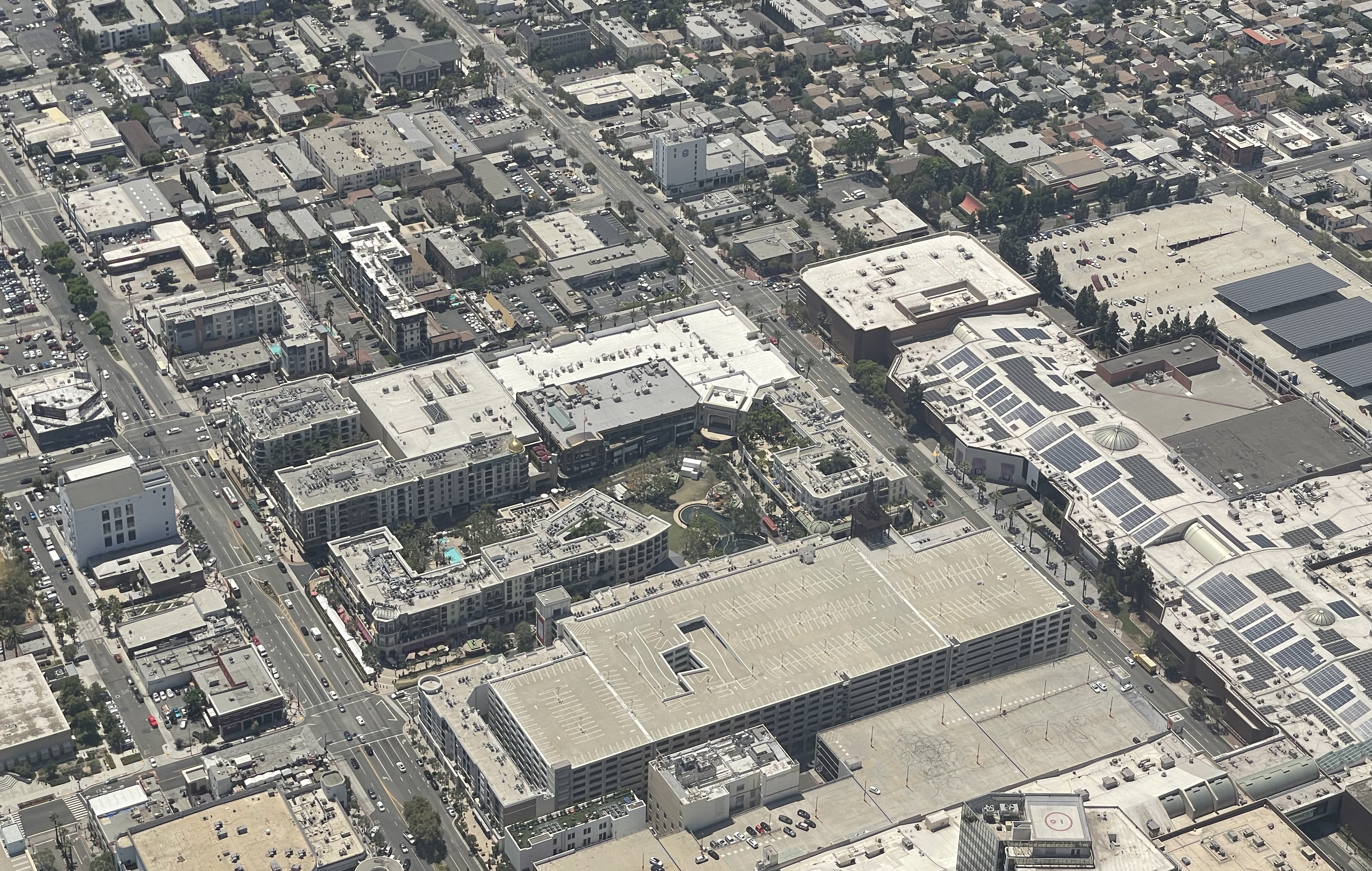
Aerial view of downtown Glendale's shopping areas (The Americana at Brand and Glendale Galleria)

The Americana project stirred debate in Glendale for four years. Some merchants feared the Grove-style "lifestyle center" would diminish business at the stores along Brand Boulevard and in the Glendale Galleria. Some residents worried about overdevelopment and traffic congestion.

Both The Americana at Brand and The Grove are organized upon the idea of a city center—with a mix of architectural styles, building heights and materials used, as well as vast open spaces at each project's center. Caruso Affiliated often casts its developments in a particular milieu. The architectural style of the Americana reflects the brick factory facades of the industrial era, with its massive elevator shaft with exposed steel beams, while The Grove is reminiscent of 1930s Los Angeles, California. Each of the two intends to appear to be a public space, but is private property and is protected as such. However, the two-acre park in the center of the complex is entirely public property. The private security force that patrols the property prevents anyone from taking photographs with professional equipment without permission. The Americana at Brand allows dogs on the property — except on its grassy area. The only breed restricted is the pit bull. Each store decides whether it allows pets.

The project opened to the public on May 2, 2008.

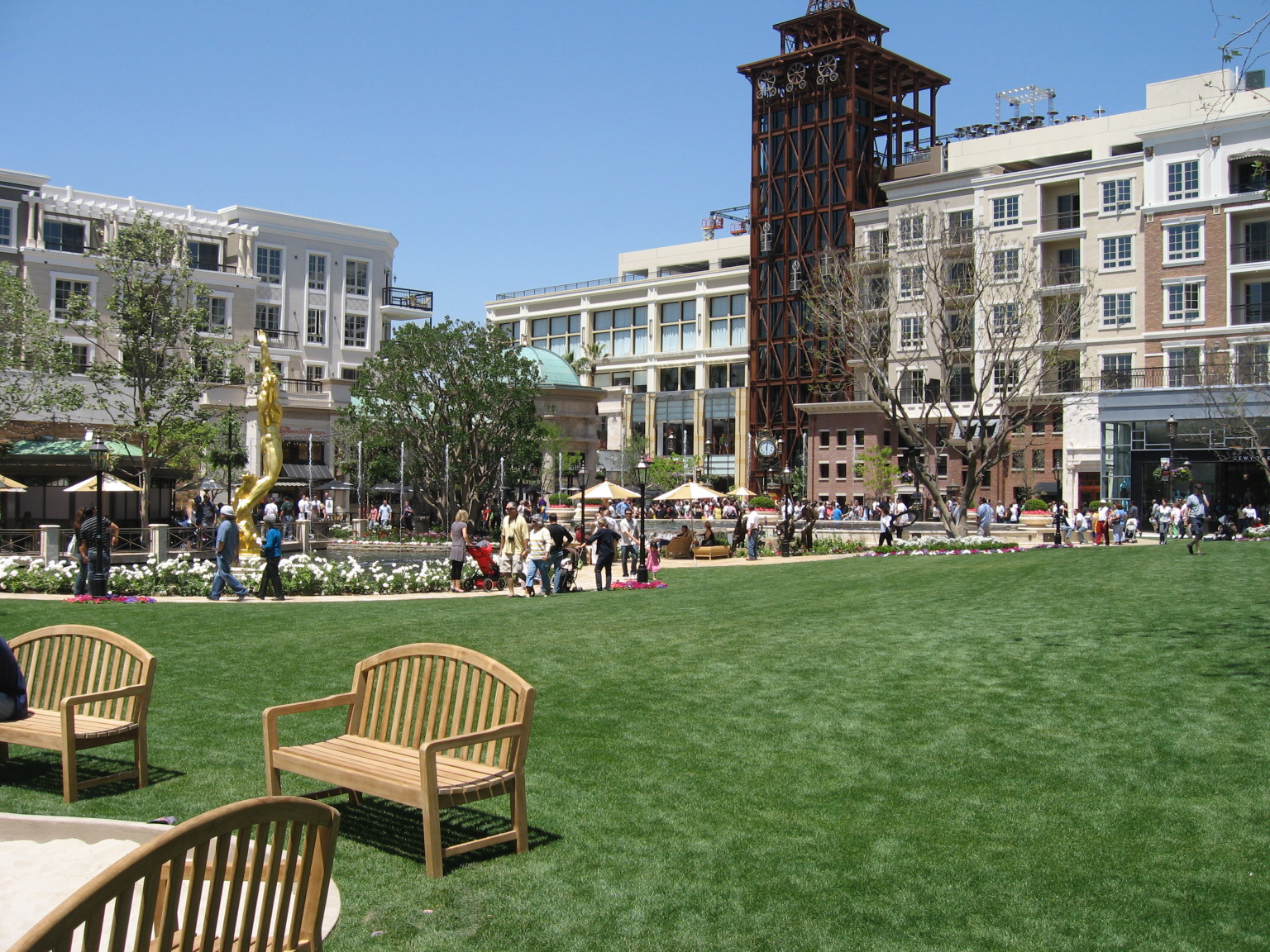
The Americana at Brand in Glendale

== List of tenants ==
As of July 2022, there are over 80 tenants in the Americana.

=== Anchors ===
- Nordstrom (opened in 2013, formerly occupied at the Glendale Galleria)
- Barnes & Noble
- AMC Theatres (reopened in August 2021, formerly Pacific Theatres)
- The Cheesecake Factory

== Attractions ==
In addition to The Americana at Brand's upscale shops, restaurants and movie theater, the outdoor mall features Waters of Americana, an animated fountain by WET. The musical fountain, located in the central landscaped park, performs every hour on the hour, though a non-musical program runs between shows. A gold-leaf statue, chosen by developer Rick Caruso, rises from the center of the fountain's smaller pool. The statue is a replica of Donald De Lue's 1949 Spirit of American Youth sculpture in France, a memorial to Americans who fought at Normandy in World War II. The statue also serves as the icon for The Americana at Brand.

An internal transit system uses a battery-powered trolley car (built by the Gomaco Trolley Company) to shuttle visitors through the main square and around the perimeter of the complex. The line was in operation from the opening of the Americana at Brand complex, in May 2008. George F. McGinnis, a retired Disney Imagineer, designed the trolley cars.

On Nov 6, 2021, Stranger Things day, Netflix launched the first-ever Stranger Things store in the Americana at Brand. The shop immerses fans in a world of supernatural mystery and 80's nostalgia in a one-of-a-kind Stranger Things experience.

Since opening, the center has expanded its offering of luxury goods, adding Bottega Veneta, Byredo, Chanel, David Yurman, Golden Goose, Gucci, Louis Vuitton, Omega, Tiffany & Co. and Yves Saint Laurent stores.

== Skyline Pitch ==
The city's first rooftop soccer space opened in October 2025. Created by experiential agency elemento L2, it features a venue of 25,000 square feet (2,300 m^{2}) on top of the Americana parking structure. There are two full size soccer fields, training areas, fut tennis, a panna cage, interactive play stations and gathering space, for parties and events.

== Holiday season ==
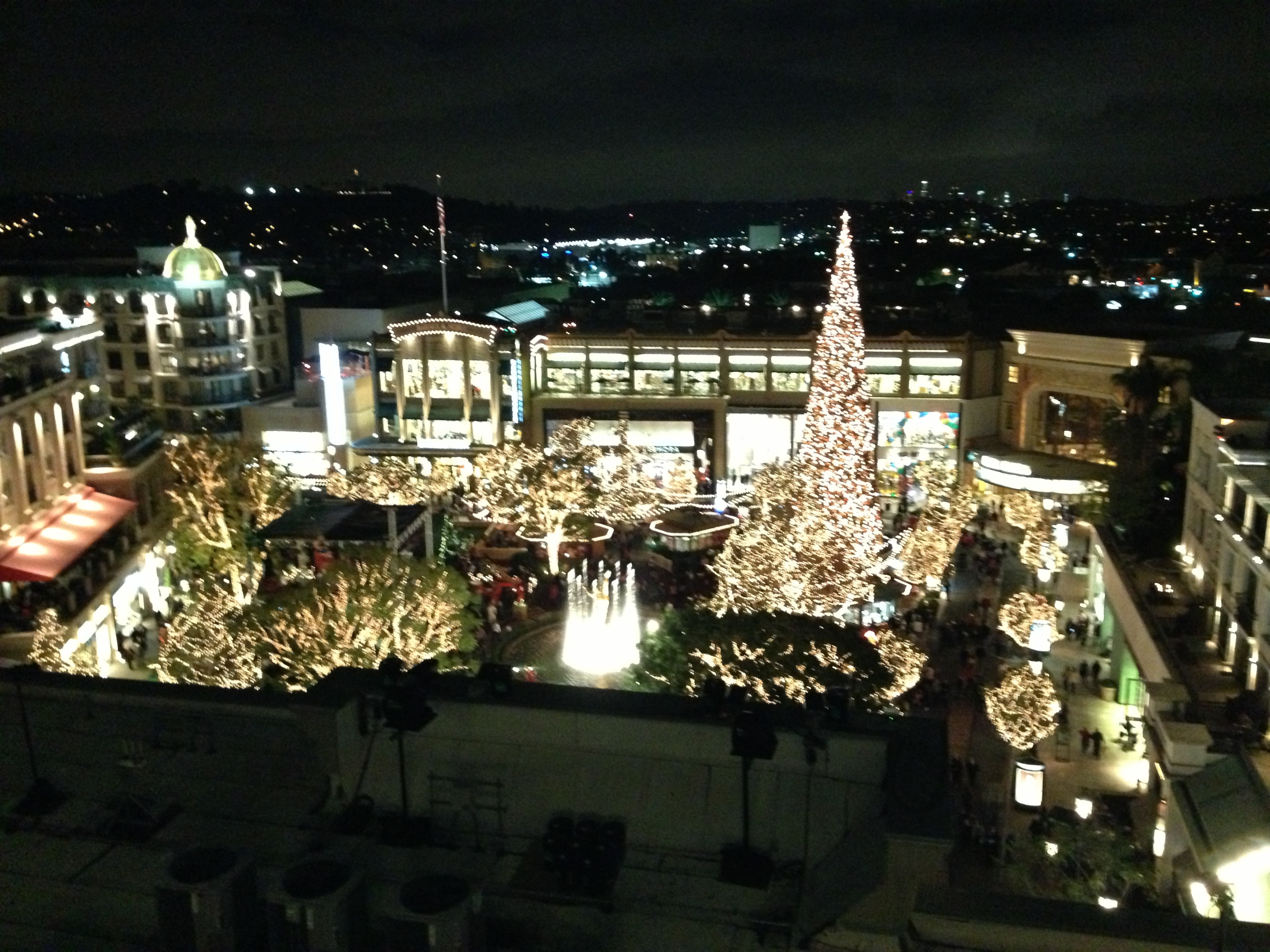
The Americana at Brand with its 100-foot Christmas tree as seen on Thursday, November 21, 2013. This image was taken minutes after the Americana at Brand's annual Christmas tree lighting ceremony. Downtown Los Angeles is visible in the distance.

During the holiday shopping season, fake snow is produced periodically every evening. In mid-November, a Christmas tree is displayed, and lit every evening, beginning with their annual Tree Lighting Ceremony. The tree remains lit every evening for the remainder of the holiday season. The tree is up to 100 feet (30 m) or more, and it is usually one of the tallest trees in Los Angeles County.

== See also ==
- Glendale Galleria – Shopping mall in Glendale, California
