= Rick Caruso =

American businessman (born 1959)

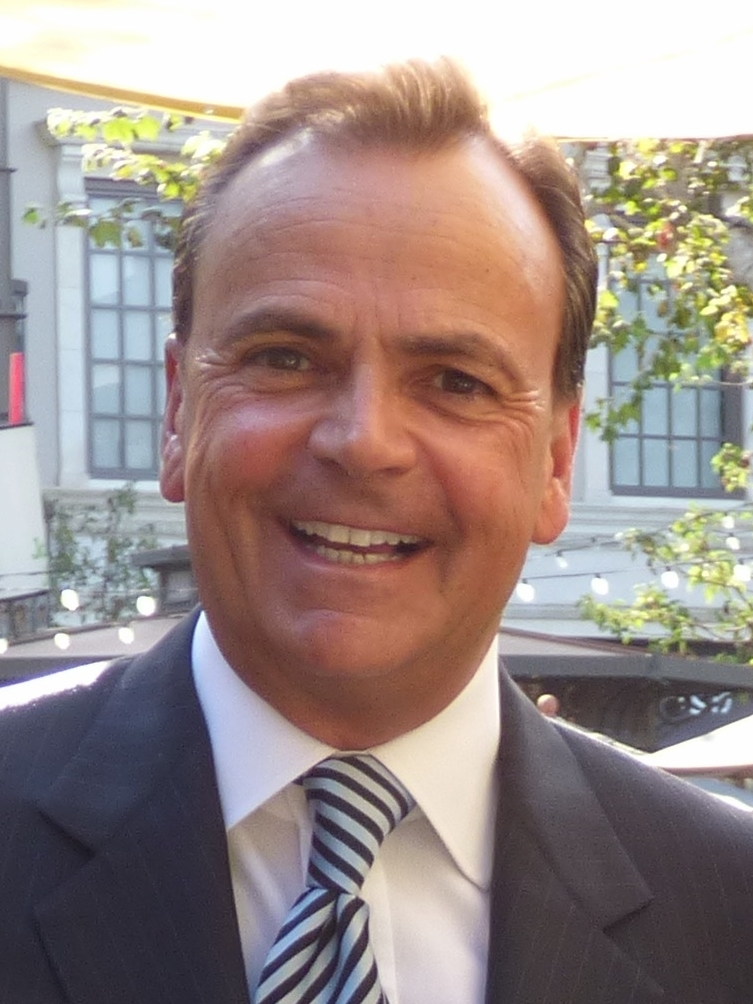
- Caruso in 2015
- Born: Rick Joseph Caruso; January 7, 1959 (age 67); Los Angeles, California, U.S.
- Education: University of Southern California (BS); Pepperdine University (JD)
- Political party: Republican (before 2011, 2016–2019); Independent (2011–2016, 2019–2022); Democratic (2022–present)
- Spouse: Tina Caruso
- Children: 4, including Gigi and Justin
- Relatives: Henry Caruso (father)
- Website: Campaign website

Rick Joseph Caruso (born January 7, 1959) is an American billionaire businessman. The founder and former CEO of the real estate company Caruso, he previously served as the chair of the board of trustees of the University of Southern California. Caruso was previously the president of the Los Angeles Police Commission, a member of the Board of Water and Power Commissioners, and was the runner-up to Karen Bass in the 2022 Los Angeles mayoral election.

== Early life and education ==
Caruso, an Italian American, was born in Los Angeles. His father, Henry Caruso, was the founder of Dollar Rent-A-Car and owner of many car dealerships in the Los Angeles area. His mother Gloria was a billboard model in her youth. Caruso earned a Bachelor of Science degree from the University of Southern California in 1980 (where he was a member of the Sigma Alpha Epsilon fraternity and the Trojan Knights); and a J.D. from the Pepperdine University School of Law in 1983 as a Margaret Martin Brock Scholar.

== Career ==
=== Real estate development ===
Caruso was a real-estate lawyer in the corporate finance department at Finley Kumble. In 1987, he founded Caruso, a company that develops, owns and manages properties. He initially purchased parking lots that his father agreed to lease for Dollar Rent-A-Car which he sold when the property rose in value. In 1990, he quit law to develop his retail and residential properties full-time.

His projects include The Grove at Farmers Market in Los Angeles, the Americana at Brand in Glendale, the Commons at Calabasas, the Promenade at Westlake, The Lakes at Thousands Oaks (leased from the City of Thousand Oaks), Waterside Marina del Rey, Palisades Village in Pacific Palisades and the Rosewood Miramar Beach in Santa Barbara.

In 2015, Caruso funded a voter initiative to bypass local planning laws and the California Environmental Quality Act (CEQA) in order to build an outdoor mall in Carlsbad, California. Although the initiative passed, a subsequent referendum overturned it and a public vote was required. This initiative, Measure A, failed and the mall construction was ultimately blocked. All together, Caruso spent $12 million in less than a year on getting the project approved. This spending included television ads, mailers, and consulting services. Despite his prior criticism of CEQA, one of his malls filed a CEQA suit in 2025, seeking to block the $1 billion Television City project in the Fairfax District of Los Angeles.

In 2016, the Los Angeles Times reported that Caruso, his affiliates and family, had given more than $476,000 to L.A. city officials over the past five years; during this time Los Angeles City Hall approved numerous building projects.

=== Public service ===
In 1985, at the age of 26, Caruso was named by Mayor Tom Bradley to serve as a commissioner for the Los Angeles Department of Water and Power, becoming the youngest commissioner in the history of the city.

In August 2001, Caruso was appointed by Mayor James K. Hahn to the Los Angeles Board of Police Commissioners and was elected its president. In this role, he led the selection process that resulted in the hiring of former New York City Police Commissioner William Bratton as the Los Angeles Chief of Police.

In 2008, Caruso was elected to serve as a member of the Los Angeles Coliseum Commission, which oversees the operations of the Los Angeles Memorial Coliseum and nearby Los Angeles Memorial Sports Arena. During his tenure on the commission, Caruso advocated for its reform, including the resignation of its general manager, and the replacement of the commission itself with a new governing body. He advocated a ban on rave parties at the two venues.

=== 2022 Los Angeles mayoral race ===
Caruso floated the idea of running for mayor of Los Angeles for the 2009 and 2013 elections, though he ultimately did not run.

In 2019, he expressed interest in running in the 2022 election. He announced his candidacy on February 11, 2022, the day before the filing deadline. During the campaign, Caruso said he supported more housing in L.A., but opposed changing zoning regulations to allow denser housing in neighborhoods that mandate single-family housing. At the time, three-quarters of residentially zoned land in Los Angeles permitted only single-family housing.

Caruso spent more than $41 million on his primary campaign, including $39 million of his own money on digital, radio, and television advertising. Caruso finished second in the June election to Karen Bass, and faced her in a runoff election on November 8, which Bass won.

== Philanthropy ==
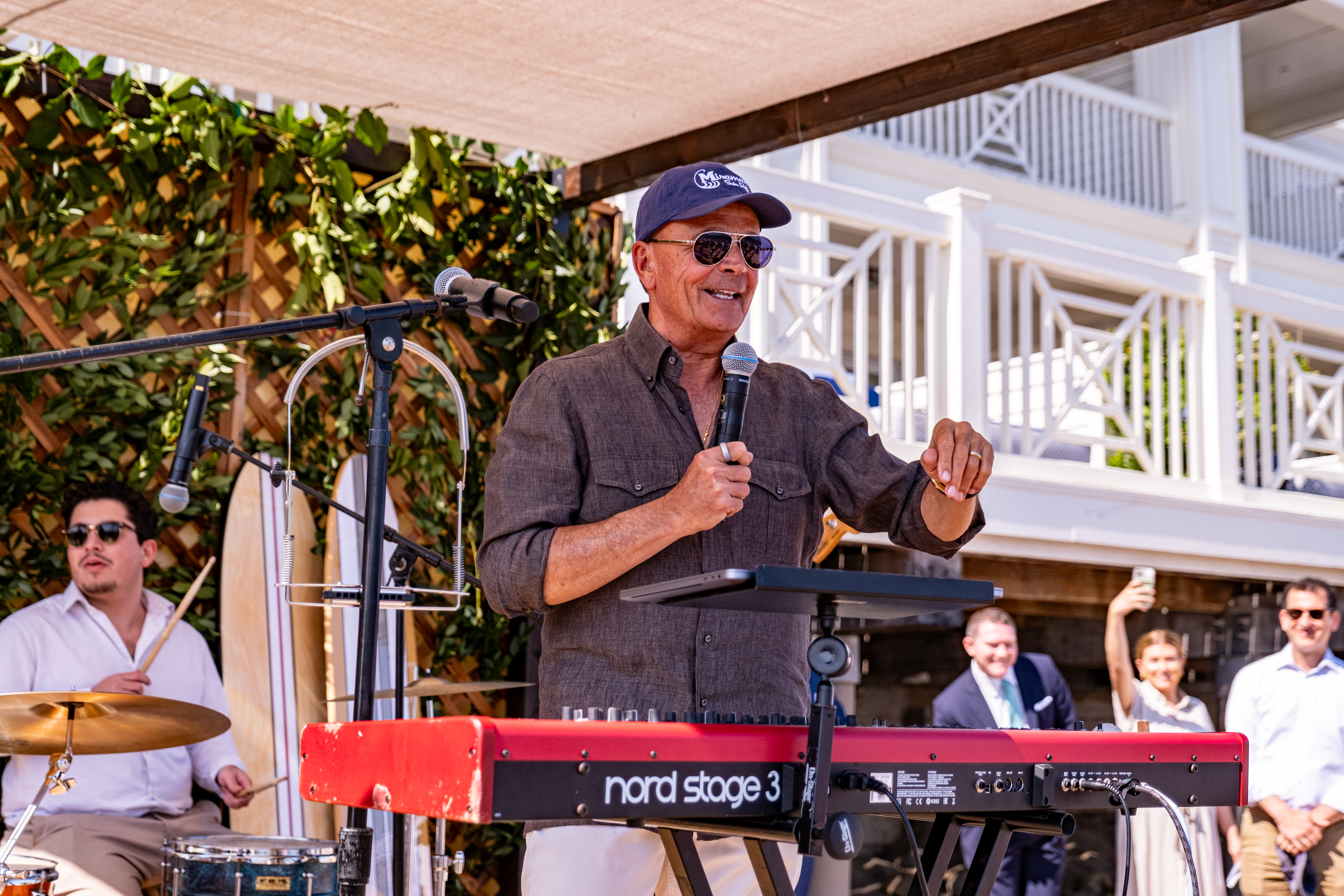
Caruso speaking at an event at Rosewood Miramar Beach, 2024

=== Caruso Family Foundation ===
Caruso founded the Caruso Family Foundation, which focuses on organizations that improve the lives of children in need of healthcare and education.

In addition to USC and Pepperdine, Caruso has made significant donations to Los Angeles academic institutions including Loyola High School and Brentwood School, which 3 of his children attended.

=== Law schools ===
Caruso and his wife, Tina, established the Caruso Loan Forgiveness Fund which covers the law school loan payments for ten years for low-income and other underserved students.

In October 2019, he donated $50 million to Pepperdine School of Law, which was renamed in his honor. The gift is directed to historically underrepresented students as well as to students pursuing public interest law.

=== University of Southern California ===
Caruso's daughter, Gianna "Gigi" Caruso, was born with hearing loss and was treated at USC's Keck School of Medicine. In 2015, Caruso and his wife Tina donated a further $25 million to USC, to endow and name the USC Tina and Rick Caruso Department of Otolaryngology – Head and Neck Surgery.

The Caruso Catholic Center and Our Savior Parish Church on the USC campus was endowed by and named after Caruso following his contribution of $9 million.

In 2018, Caruso was elected chairman of USC's board of trustees; he resigned from the position in 2022. As of May 2026, he remains a voting member of the board.

As the chairman of USC's board of trustees, Caruso was criticized for his handling of the George Tyndall USC sexual abuse scandal, in which a USC gynecologist spent 30 years molesting hundreds of patients, despite complaints dating back to 1991. In May 2018, Caruso promised an independent investigation and an accompanying public report, but no report on the investigation has been made public.

=== January 2025 Southern California wildfires ===
In the wake of the January 2025 Southern California wildfires, Caruso became a prominent critic of his former mayoral opponent Karen Bass's response to the Palisades Fire and advocated for greater firefighting resources. On January 12, 2025, Caruso and his wife pledged $5 million to the Los Angeles Fire Department Foundation.

== Recognition ==
Rick Caruso's 65.5 meter yacht Invictus at anchor in Newport Beach, California

In 1995, Caruso was named Alumnus of the Year by Pepperdine School of Law. He was named by the Los Angeles Business Journal as "Developer of the Year" and its 2012 Ernst & Young LLP Master Entrepreneur of the Year.

Caruso has lectured on real estate issues at the Kennedy School of Public Administration at Harvard University, the USC Price School of Public Policy and the Milken Institute Global Conference. He has also been a guest panelist for the International Council of Shopping Centers.

== Personal life ==
Caruso and his wife, Tina, have four children: Alex, Gregory, Justin, and Gianna. They live in the Brentwood neighborhood of Los Angeles. Caruso is a devout Catholic.
