= Donna Feldman =

American model, TV host, actress (b. 1982)

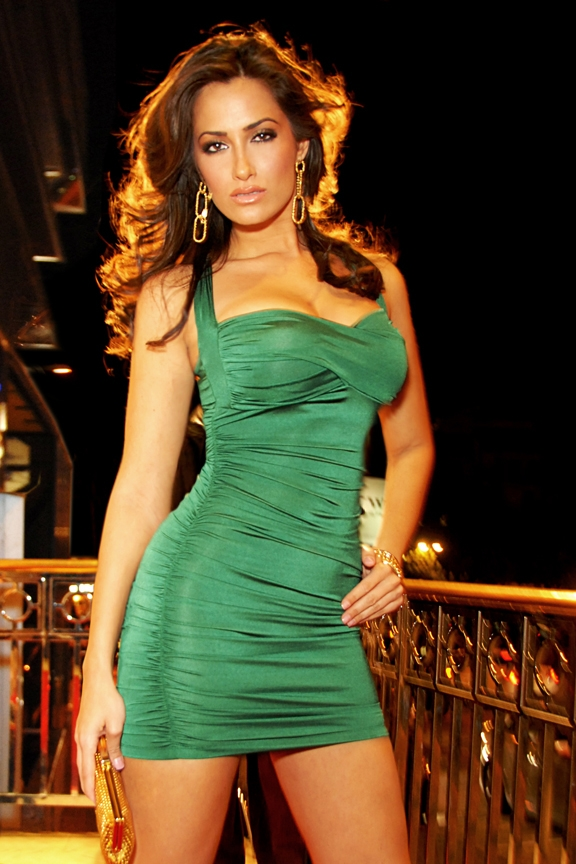
- Feldman in 2008
- Born: April 23, 1982 (age 44); Calabasas, California, U.S.
- Education: Fashion Institute of Design & Merchandising
- Height: 5 ft 10 in (1.78 m)
- Beauty pageant titleholder
- Title: USA Top Model 2010
- Years active: 2003–present
- Hair color: Brown
- Eye color: Hazel
- Major competition: USA Top Model 2010
- Website: www.donnafeldman.net

Donna Feldman (born April 28, 1982) is an American model, actress, and TV host. Feldman is known for her role in the American soap opera Fashion House. She also made a cameo appearance in the 2008 American comedy film You Don't Mess with the Zohan.

== Early years ==
Donna was born and raised in Calabasas, California. Her parents are Israeli immigrants of Russian Jewish and Polish Jewish descent.

Feldman was discovered while obtaining a marketing and merchandizing degree at the Fashion Institute of Design and Merchandising. After graduation she pursued her career in modeling.

== Career ==
=== Modeling ===
Feldman is a commercial fashion model who appears in magazines such as GQ, Maxim, "Marie Claire", "Esquire", and "FHM" to name a few. She has appeared on the cover of FHM Australia, Esquire in the Czech Republic, Maxim in Germany, GQ in Mexico and "GQ" India, FHM in South Africa, and DT in Spain. Additionally, she has appeared on the covers AC Luxury magazine, Vegas Essential, La Direct Stepping Out, Fitness RX, In Design, and Shy magazine in the United States.

==== 2010s ====
In 2010 Donna Feldman was voted USA Top Model of the year, in 2010s Feldman appeared in campaigns for Visa Blackcard, Kardashian Kollection, Bentley, Jockey, Conturelle lingerie, 1921jeans, Apart Fashion, Bebe, Bejeweled by Susan Fixel, Bellagio Resort, Belldini, Caesar's Palace, Christian Audigier, Christian Audigier Swimwear, Diesel, Faber Felina Lingerie, Finest Fashion, Fila, Jaguar, Lucky Brand, Madeleine, Miraclesuit Swimwear, Parisa Lingerie, Conturelle Lingerie, A. Che swimwear, Lisa Blue, Mouwad Jewelry, Tecumseh Shoes, Nautica, New Yorker, Panasonic, Platini Jeans, Pleasure State Vip, Pontiac for Sports Illustrated, Quelle, Rampage, Revlon, Sean John, Tara, Tart Collection, Target, Tornado, Varla, Verizon Wireless, Wella, Westfield Shopping Center and Zanetti.

==== 2020s ====
As of 2021, she is signed to NTA Talent in Los Angeles, Ford Models in Chicago, Heffner Models in Seattle, Ice Models in Cape Town, Scout in San Francisco.

=== Acting ===
In 2003, she starred opposite Justin Timberlake in the music video "Señorita". She also appeared in music videos "Blame the Vain" for Dwight Yoakam, "Mr. Bartender (It's So Easy)" for Sugar Ray, and "Tired of Being Sorry" for Enrique Iglesias.

In 2005, Feldman was a trophy presenter at the 2005 Academy Awards, which led to her gaining a spot on Deal or No Deal. Feldman held the number 22 suitcase for most of the show's first season, but she left to pursue a role on Fashion House. Fashion House was a TV drama where Feldman played Gloria in 65 episodes, airing in over 50 countries worldwide.

In 2007, Feldman played a small part in the television show, Las Vegas. In 2008, she was offered a role in Adam Sandler's You Don't Mess with the Zohan. She was chosen by Sandler after he saw her in an editorial for Stuff magazine. Due to the success of that film, Feldman was offered a co-host position on The Fashion Team and a panelist position on Redeye.

In 2011, Feldman appeared in a Visa Black card commercial and landed small television roles on Chuck, Deadliest Warrior, and Castle.

In 2019, Feldman was cast in the movie My Killer Client and, in 2020, played Paula on television show Magnum P.I. She was also cast in a recurring role on Tyler Perry's show The Oval.
