= Park Moderne =

Artist colony and planned community

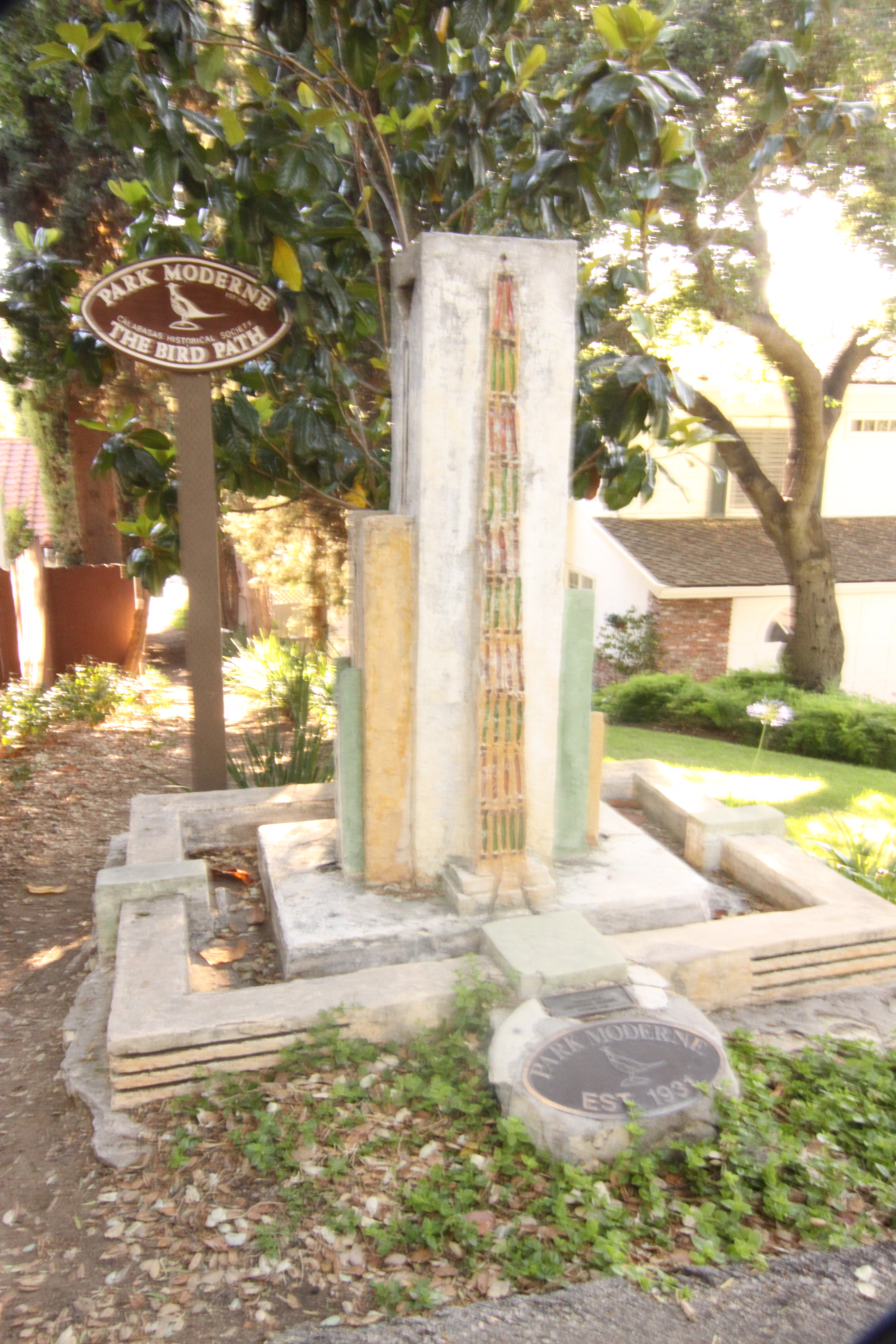
One of the last remnants of Park Moderne, an Art Deco fountain.

Park Moderne, also known as “The Bird Streets,” was an artists' colony and the first planned community in Calabasas, California. It was founded between 1927 and 1931.

== History ==
Circa 1927, Dutch-born Modern art empresario and real estate developer William Lingenbrink and Modern architect Rudolph Schindler partnered with homesteader Samuel Cooper Jr. to build an avant-garde artists’ colony on 140 acres of ranch land. The land was subdivided into 174 lots of 5,000 square-feet each. Lots in the new neighborhood had asking prices of $100 to $350.

All the streets were named after different species of birds. Artists' work was randomly displayed throughout the roads.

Residents of the area included sculptor Andy Anderson (home still standing), portrait painter Paul von Klieben, songwriter Dick Coburn, author Margaret Larson, local historian Laura B. Gaye, and designers Walter Dorrer and Charles Gretz. Most of the original Park Moderne homes were replaced in the 1960s.

=== Housing covenants ===
Park Moderne was a segregated neighborhood. It was the only residential subdivision in Calabasas to ever have had racial covenants.

== Gallery ==
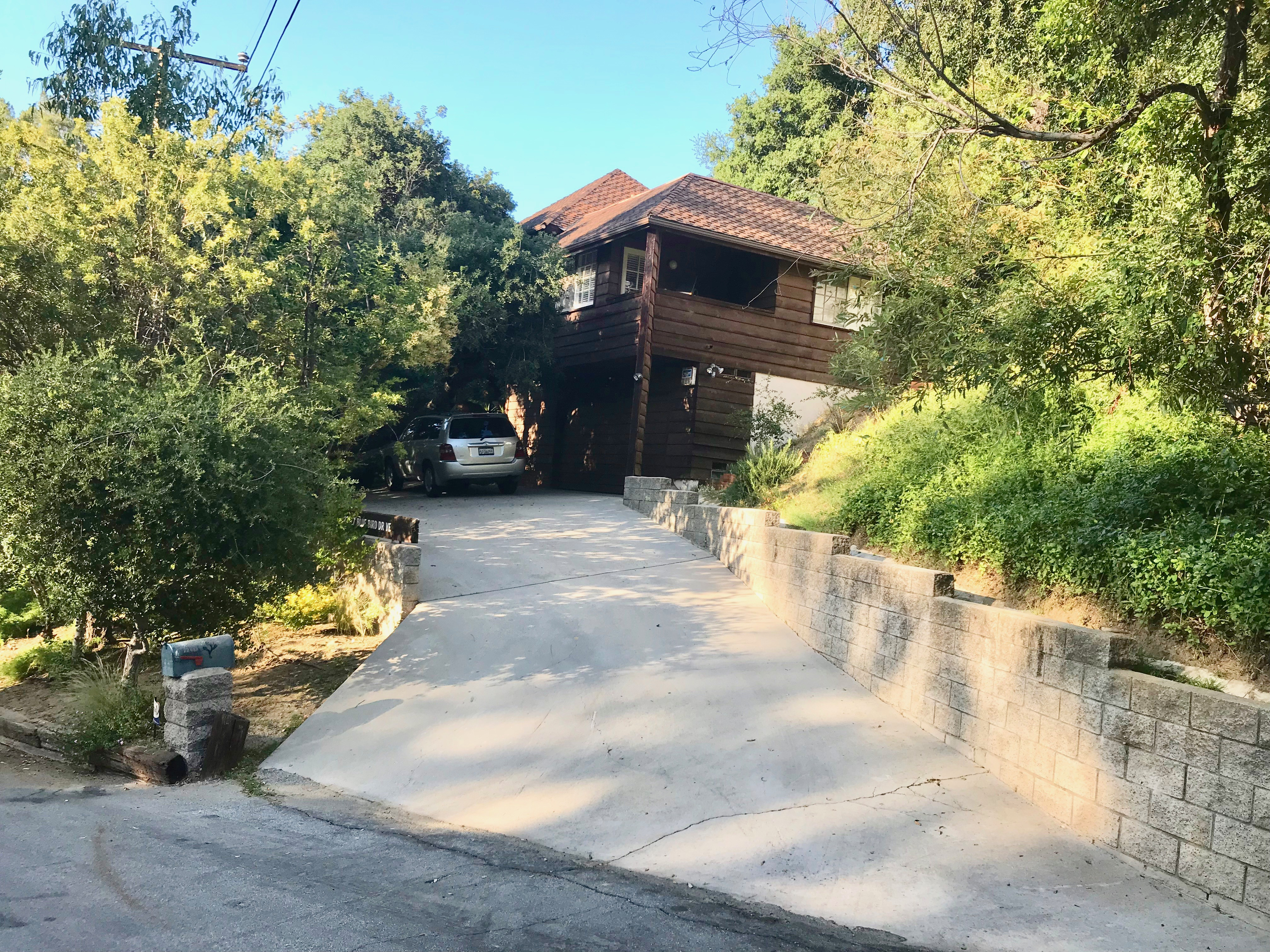

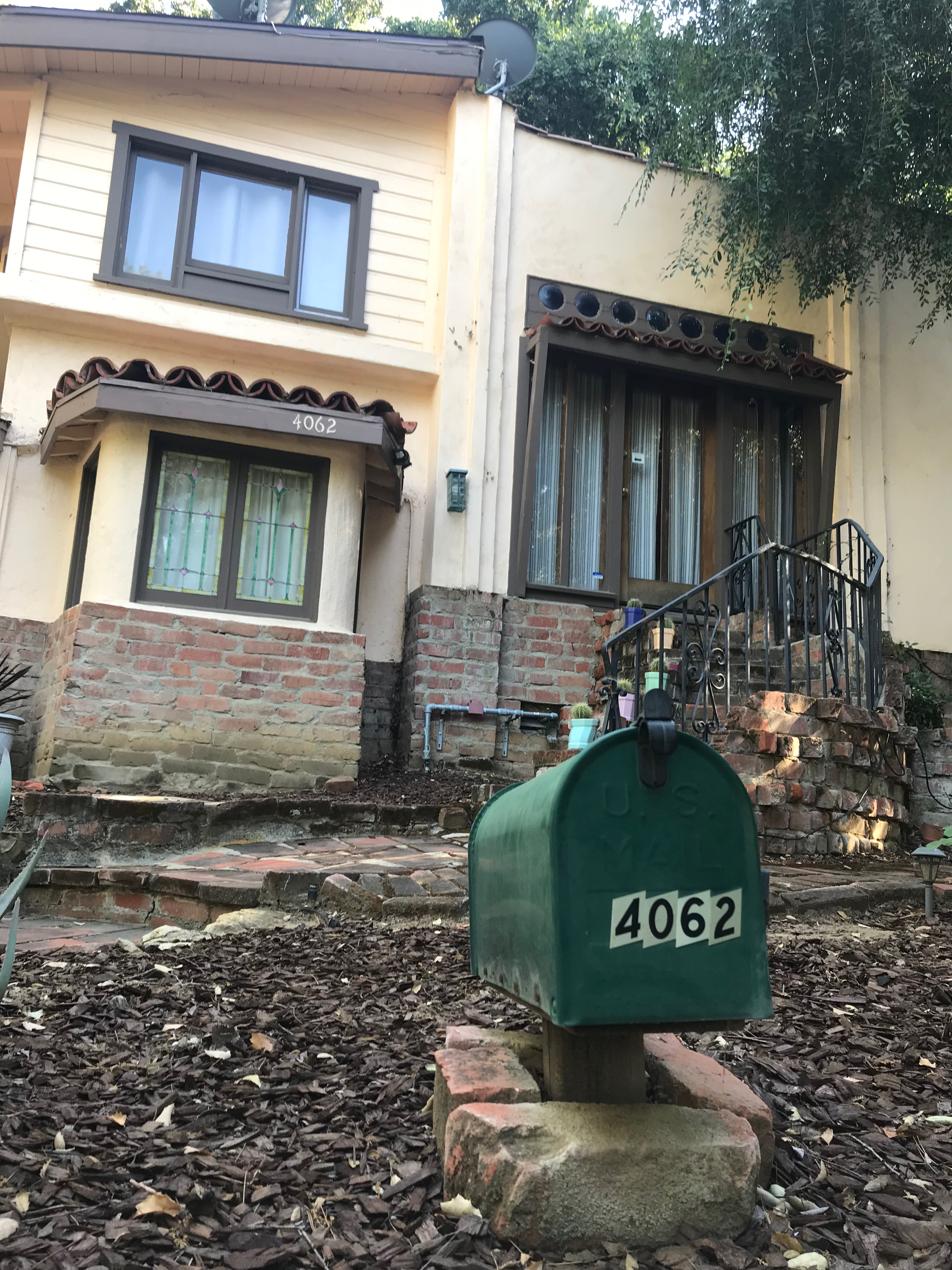

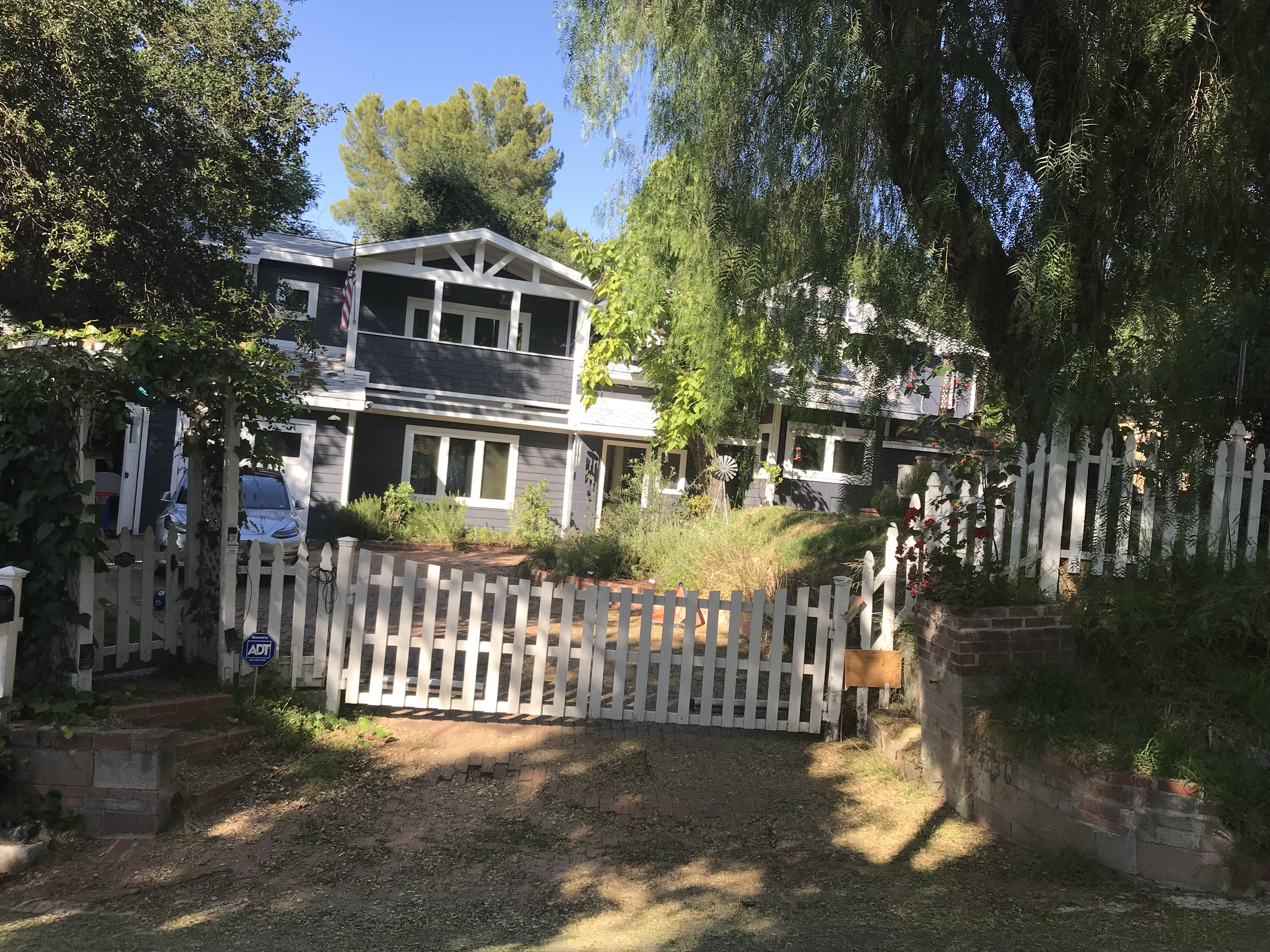

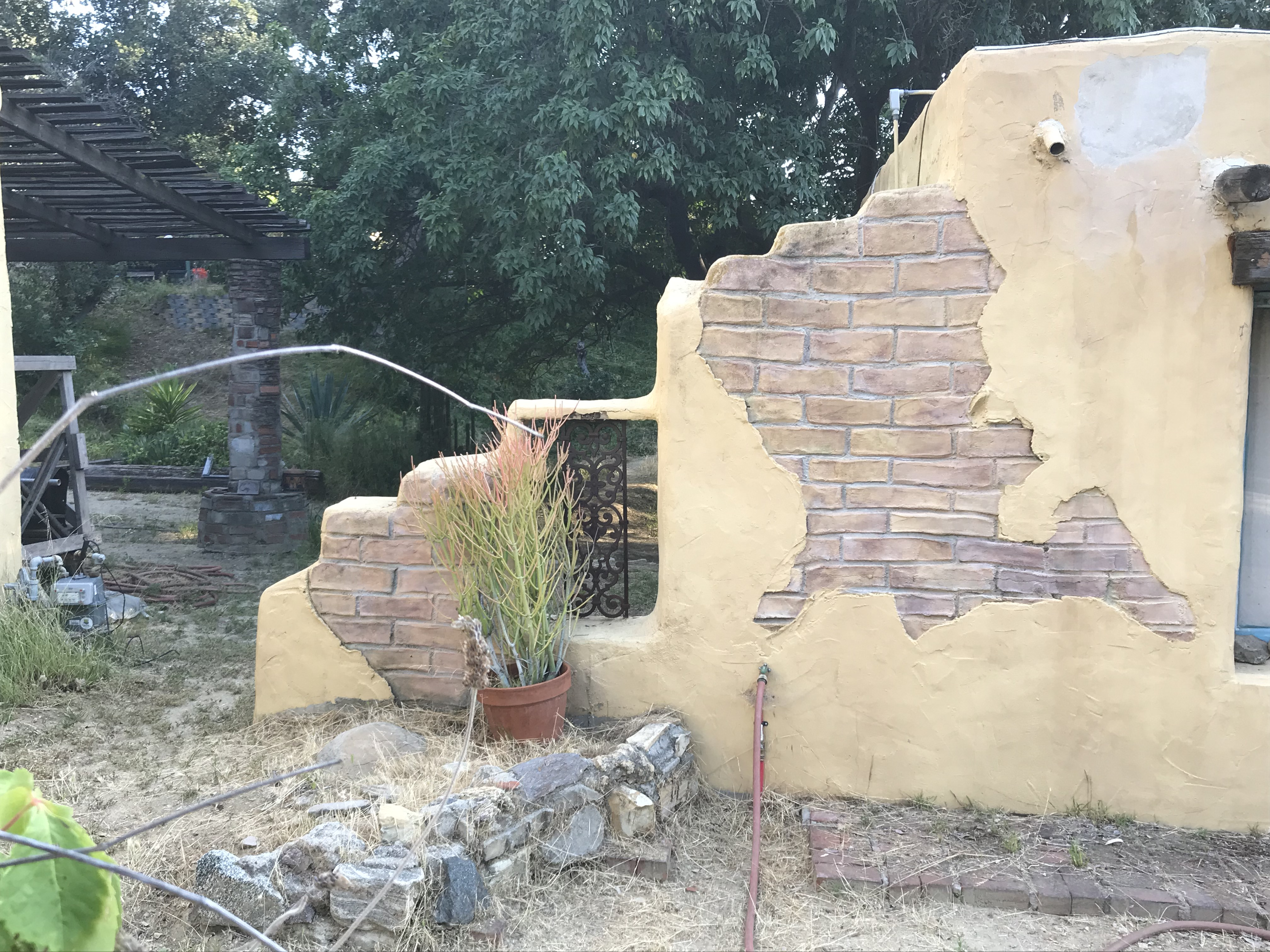

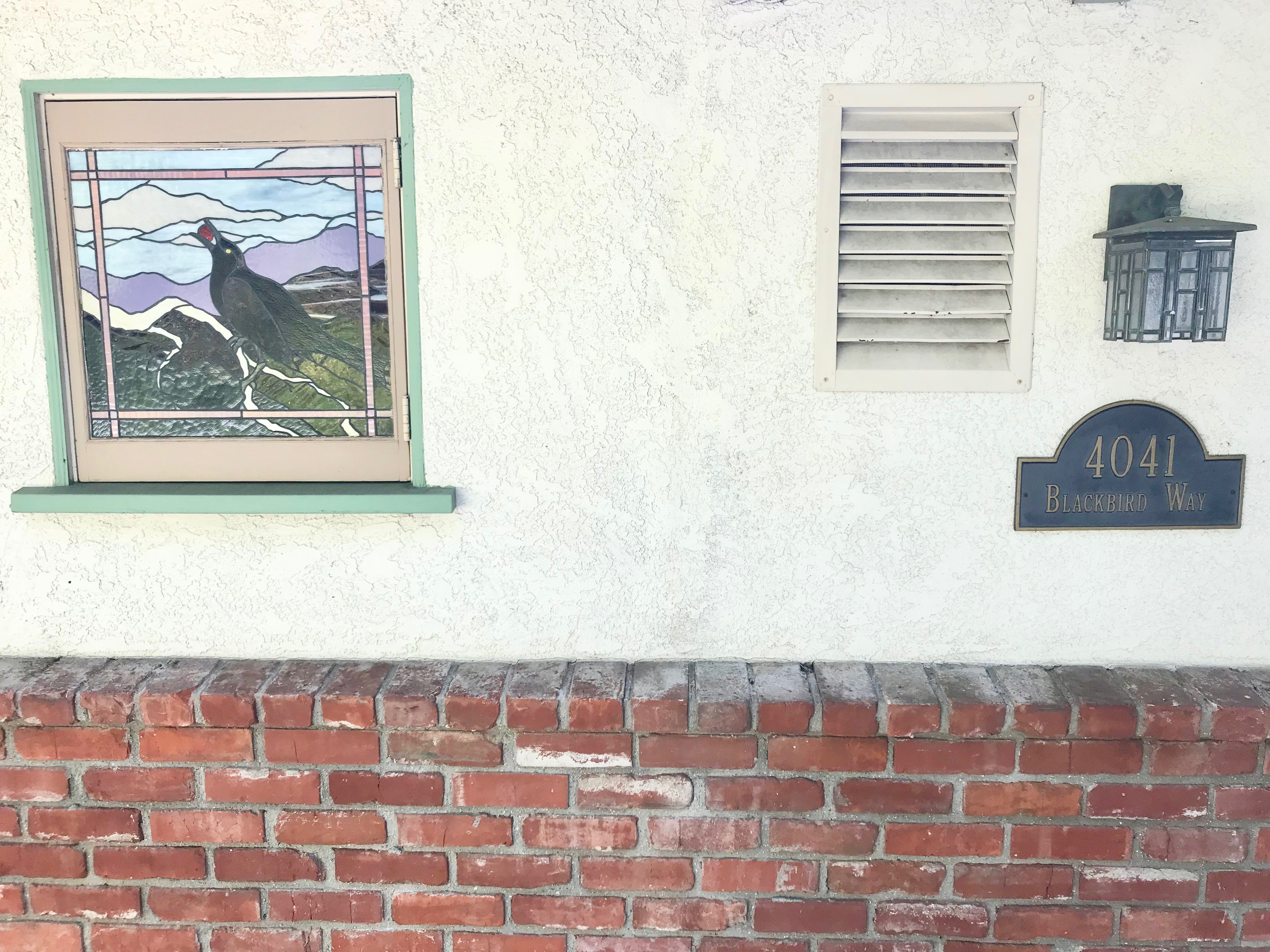

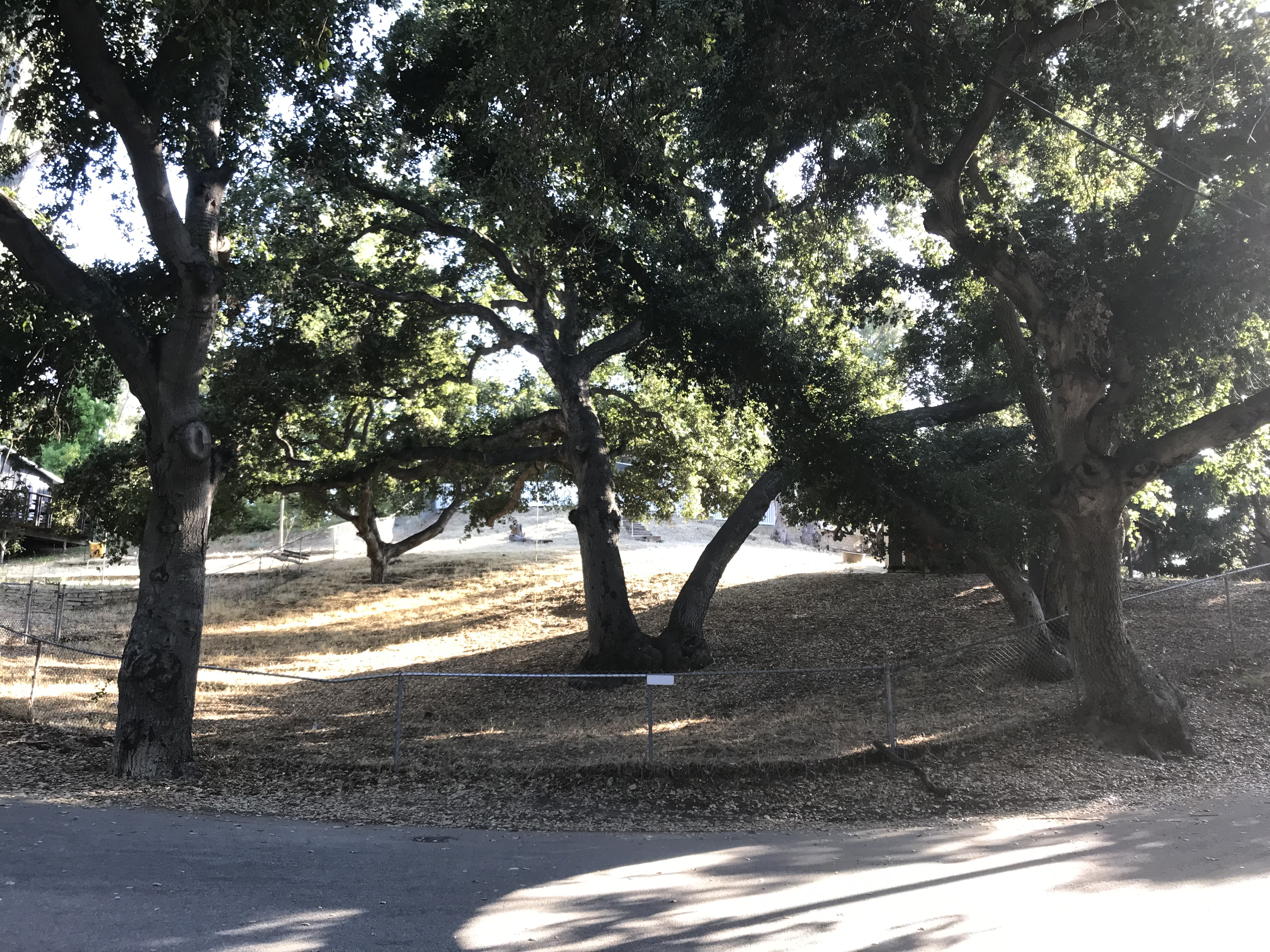

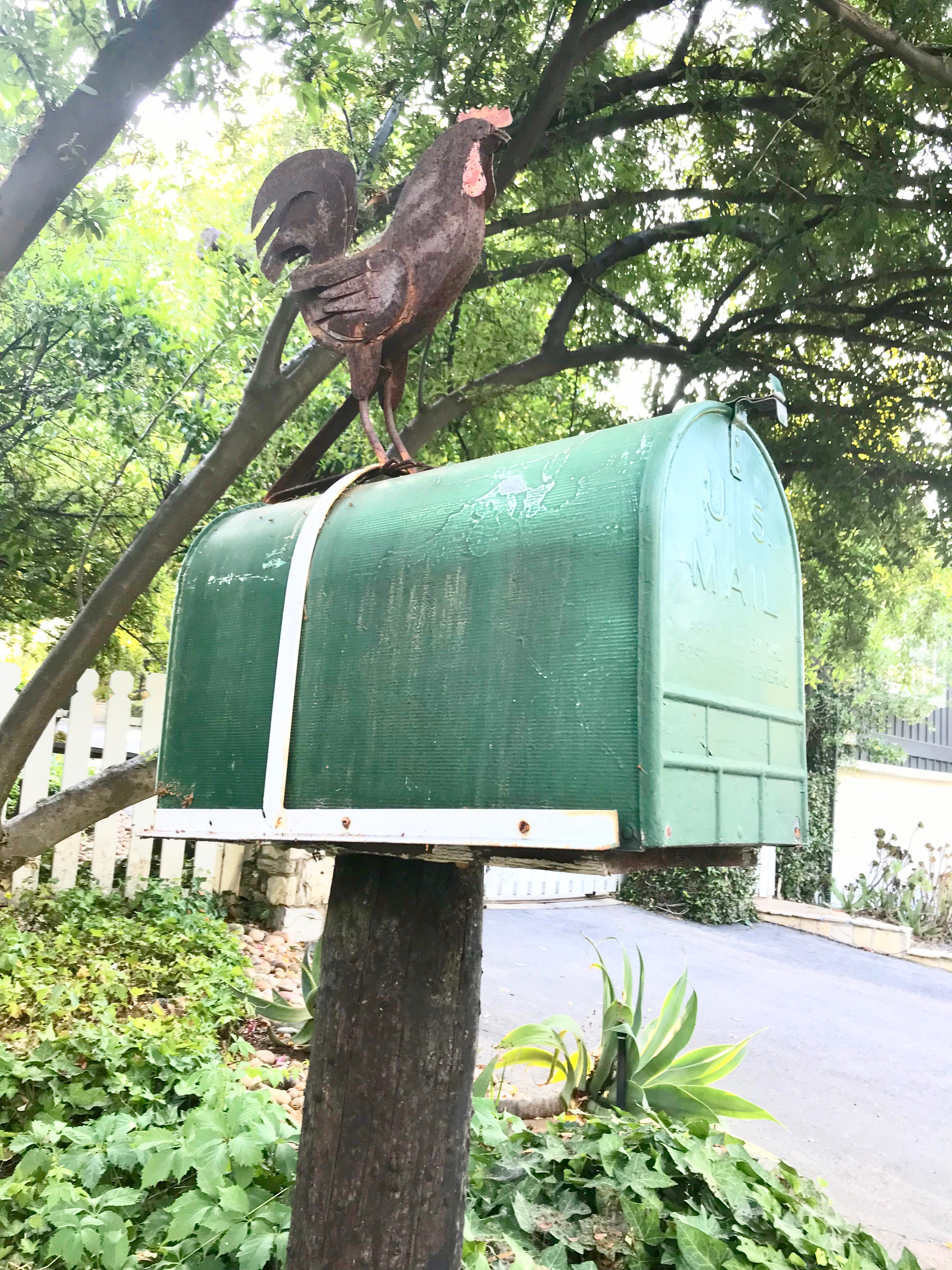

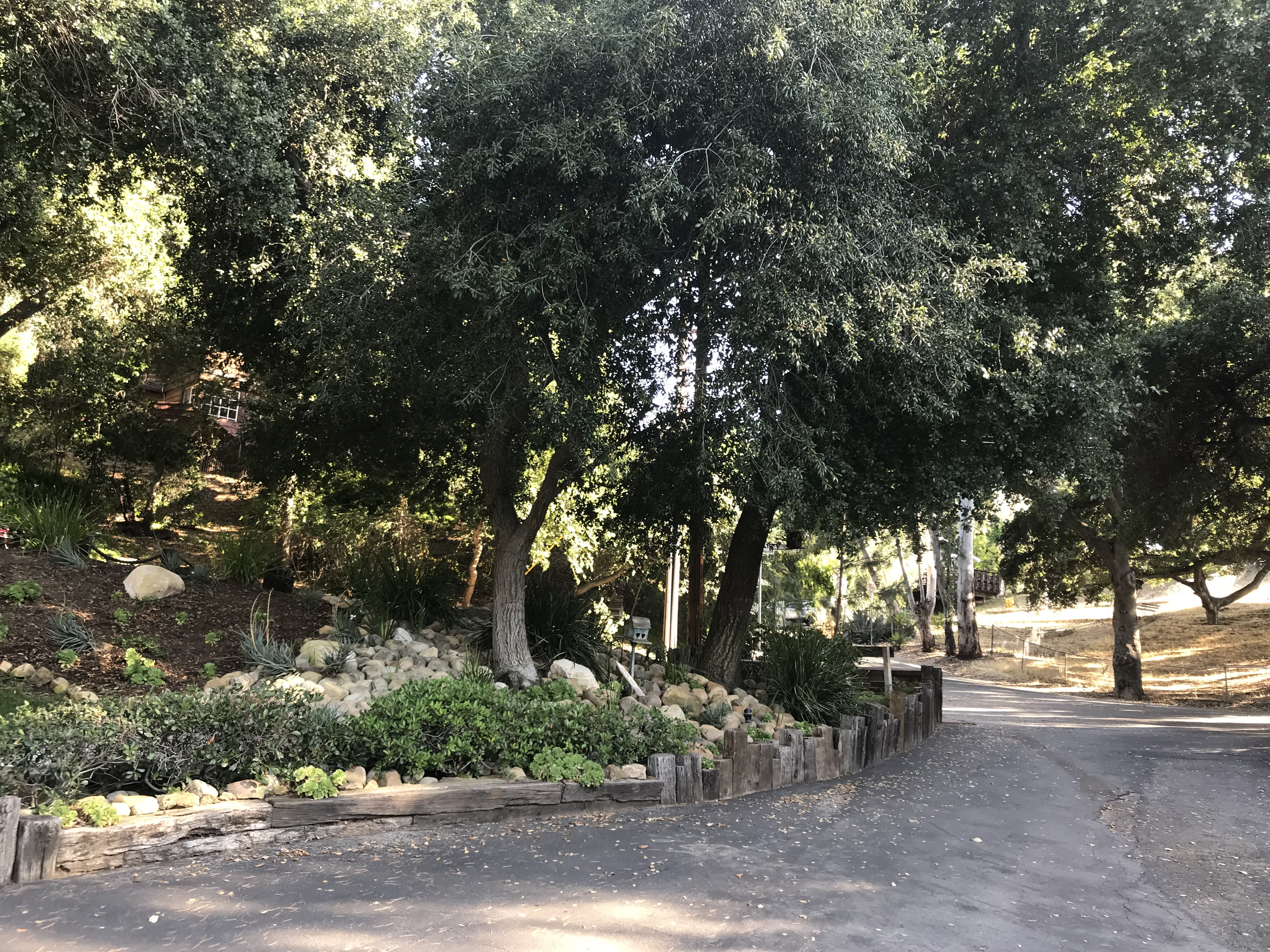

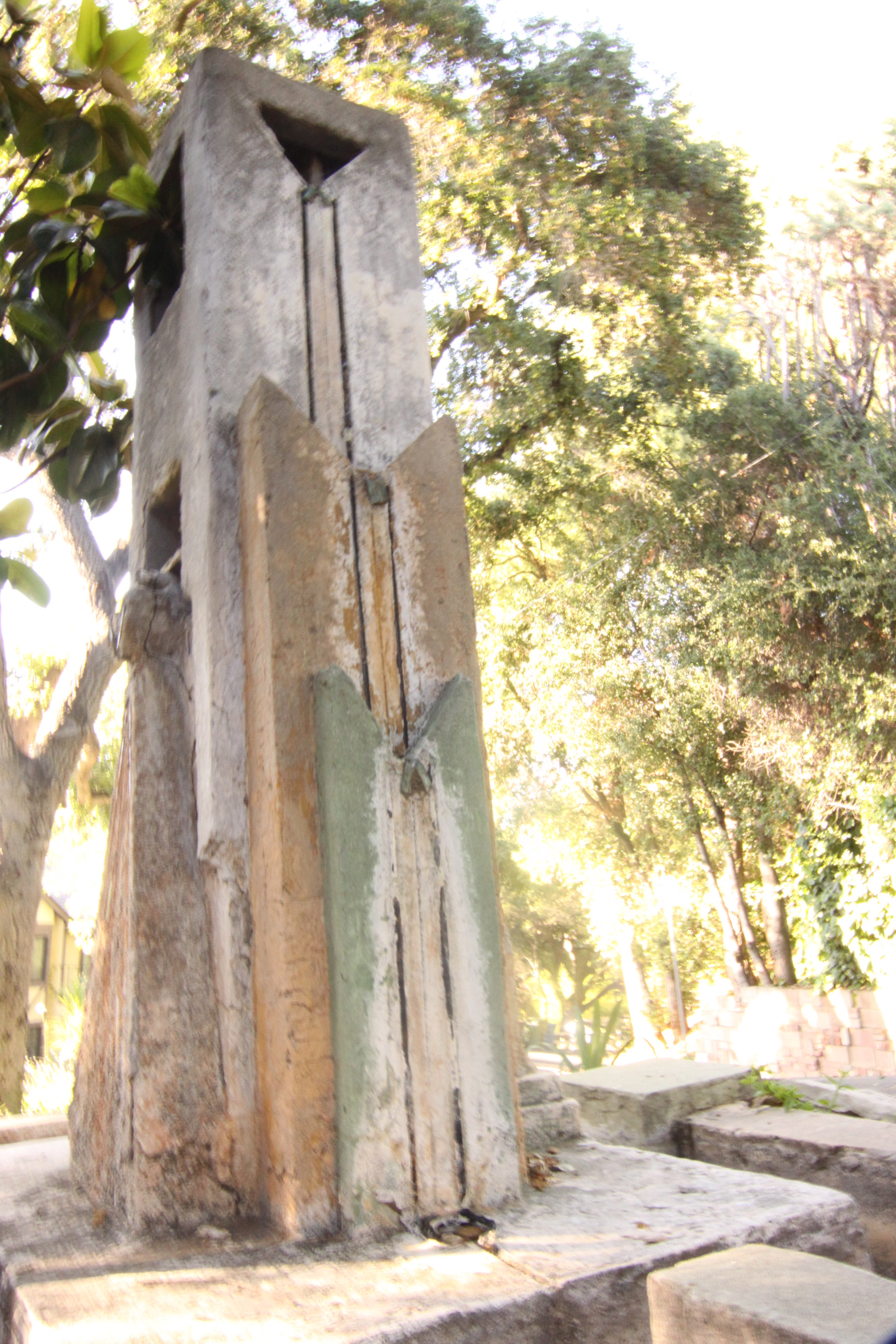

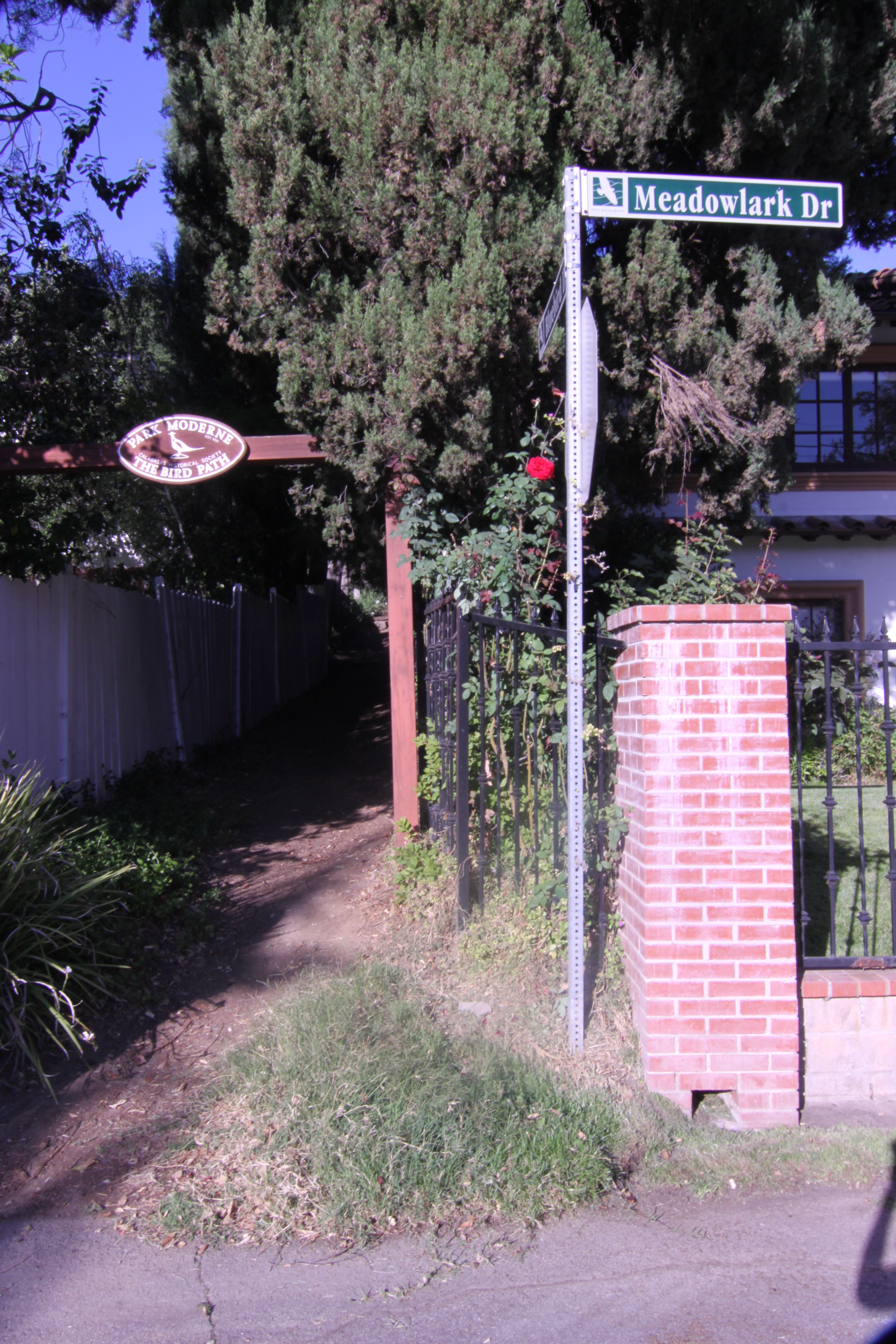
