= Calabasas, California =

City in California, United States

- City
- City of Calabasas
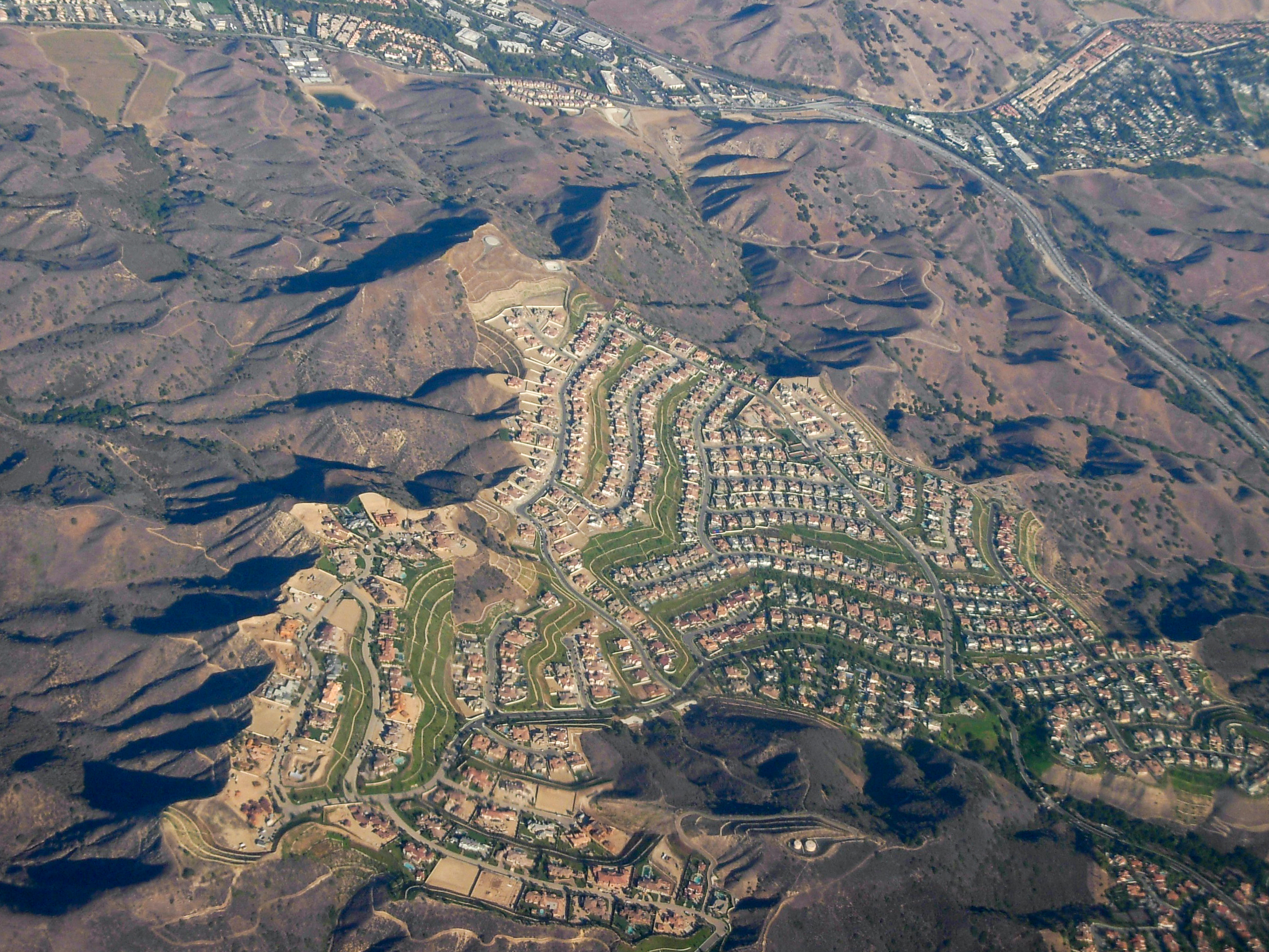
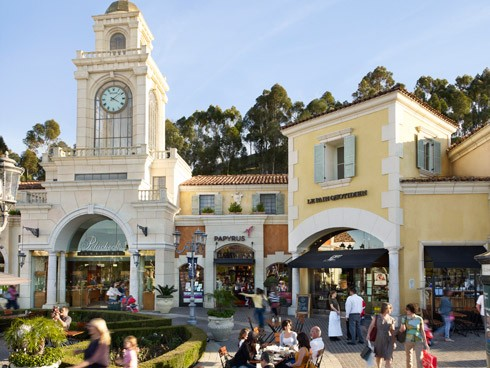
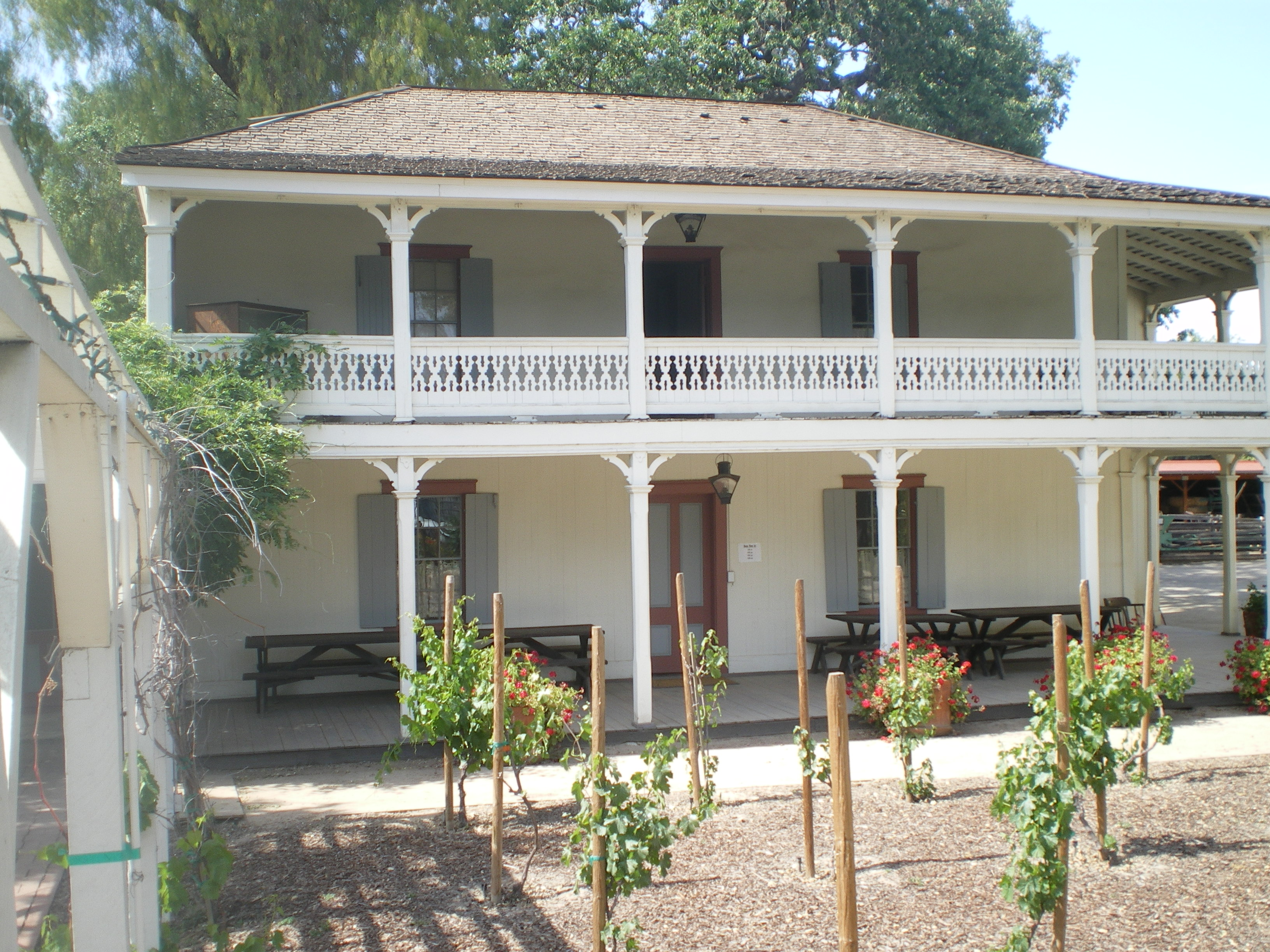
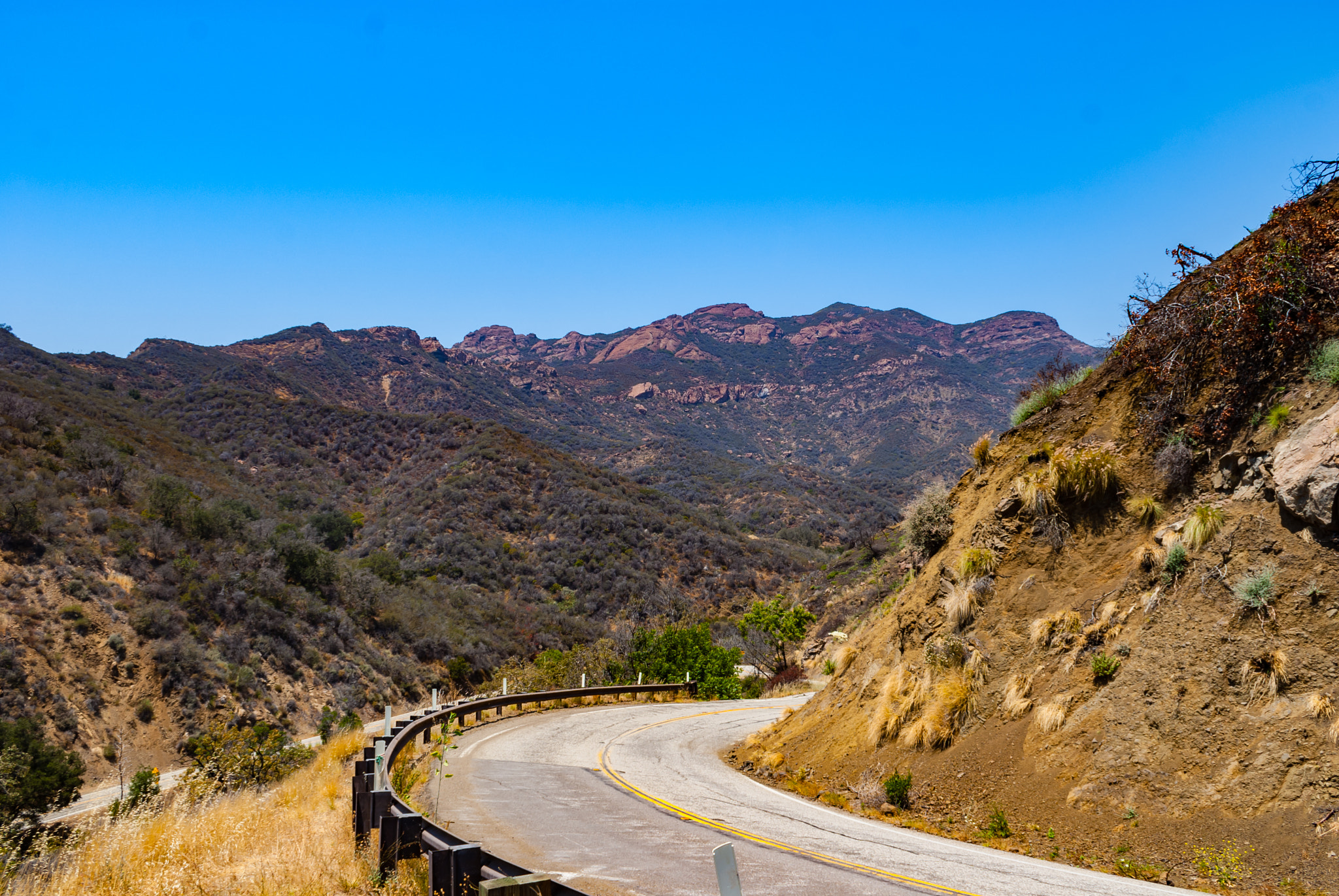
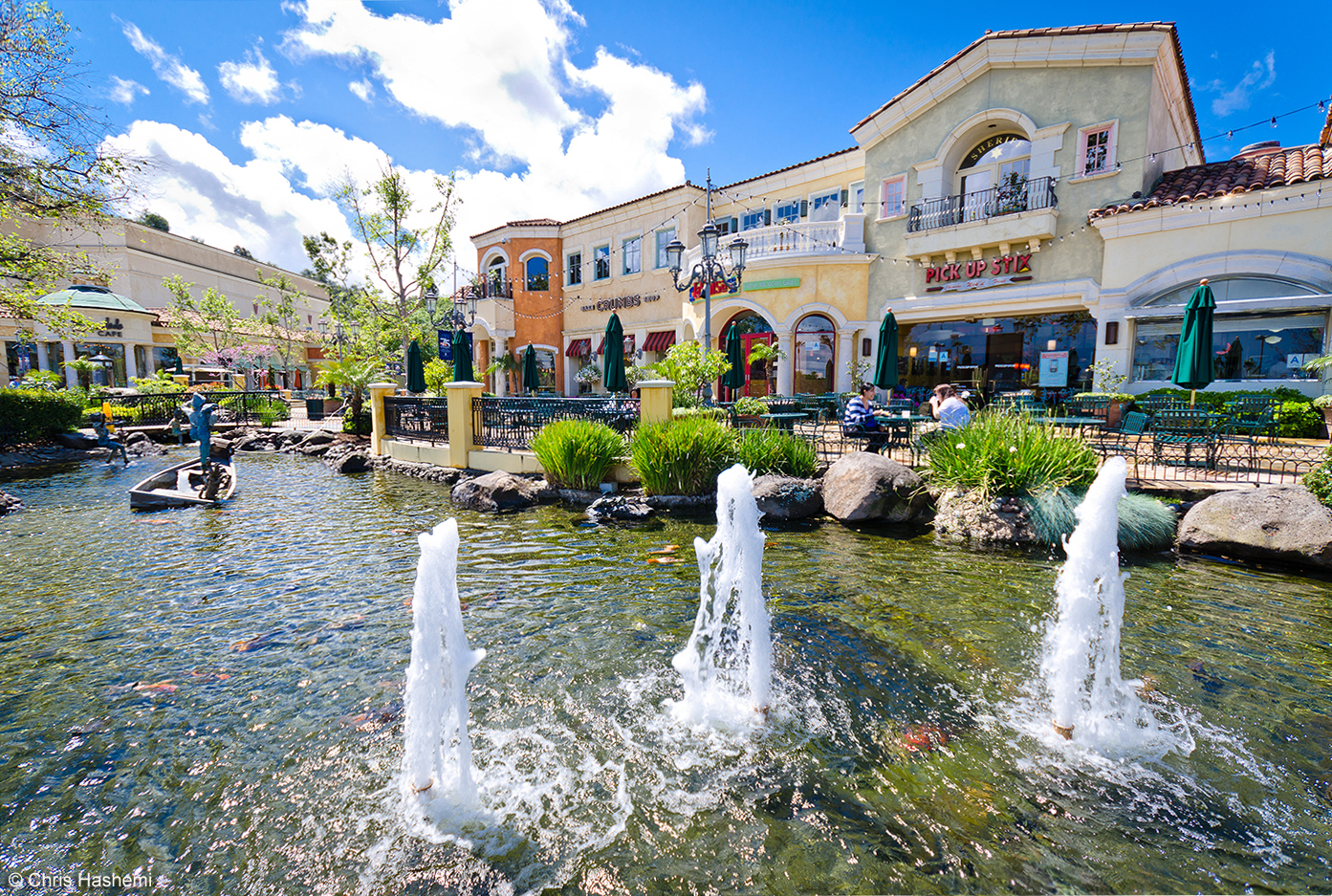
- Clockwise: Aerial view of Calabasas looking northwest; Leonis Adobe; The Commons at Calabasas; Mulholland Highway; The Commons

- Flag Seal Logo
- Interactive map of Calabasas, California
- Location in Los Angeles metropolitan area Location in California Location in the United States Calabasas (North America)
- Coordinates: 34°8′18″N 118°39′39″W
- Country: United States
- State: California
- County: Los Angeles
- Incorporated: April 5, 1991
- Named for: Spanish calabazas "winter squashes"

Government
  - Type: Council–manager
  - Mayor: Peter Kraut
  - Mayor pro tem: James R. Bozajian
  - City council: Ed Albrecht; David J. Shapiro; Alicia Weintraub
  - City manager: Kindon Meik

Area
  - Total: 13.74 sq mi (35.59 km^{2})
  - Land: 13.71 sq mi (35.50 km^{2})
  - Water: 0.035 sq mi (0.09 km^{2}) 0.38%
- Elevation: 928 ft (283 m)

Population (2020)
  - Total: 23,241
  - Density: 1,695.5/sq mi (654.63/km^{2})
- Time zone: UTC-8 (Pacific)
  - Summer (DST): UTC-7 (PDT)
- ZIP codes: 91301, 91302
- Area code: 747 and 818
- FIPS code: 06-09598
- GNIS feature IDs: 239994, 2409955
- Website: www.cityofcalabasas.com

Calabasas (/ˌkæləˈbæsəs/, CAL-ə-BASS-əs; corruption of calabazas, Spanish for "squashes") is a city in Los Angeles County, California, United States. It is adjacent to the southwestern San Fernando Valley neighborhoods of Los Angeles. Situated within the foothills of the Santa Monica and Santa Susana mountains, 29.9 miles (48.1 km) northwest of downtown Los Angeles, Calabasas has a population of 22,491 (as of July 1, 2022). The name Las Calabazas was first recorded as a place name in 1792.

== History ==
The name Calabasas is an archaic Californio variant spelling of the Spanish word calabazas, meaning "winter squashes" (the area abounds in wild squashes). The Spanish botanist Jose Longinos Martinez recorded Las Calabazas as a place name in 1792.

The San Fernando Valley has been inhabited by the Chumash and Tongva for thousands of years. Spanish explorers were the first Europeans to set foot on the land. In 1770, an expedition headed by Gaspar de Portolá crossed the area while returning to Mexico from Northern California. In 1776, a northbound party of explorers led by Juan Bautista de Anza camped there on its way from Mexico.

Calabasas was the name given to a ranchería in the Los Angeles area in 1795. The Leonis Adobe, in Old Town Calabasas, dates back to 1844 and is one of the oldest existing buildings in greater Los Angeles. The city was incorporated on April 5, 1991, making it the newest city in Los Angeles County.

== Geography ==
Calabasas is situated in the southwestern region of the San Fernando Valley, between the foothills of the Santa Monica and Santa Susana mountains. It is 29.9 miles (48.1 km) northwest of downtown Los Angeles (via US 101). The city is bordered by the Woodland Hills neighborhood of Los Angeles to the northeast, Topanga to the east, Malibu to the south, Agoura Hills to the west, and Hidden Hills to the north. The commemorative El Camino Real runs east–west through Calabasas as the Ventura Freeway (US 101).

By 2015, several annexations had increased the city's total land area to 13.6 square miles (35 km^{2}).

One of the oldest neighborhoods in Calabasas is Park Moderne, or the "Bird Streets". A former artists' colony, remnants remain of the clubhouse, pool, and cabins scattered across streets with bird names, such as Meadow Lark, Blackbird, Bluebird, and Hummingbird located directly behind Calabasas High School.

=== Climate ===
Calabasas has a hot-summer Mediterranean climate with mild, relatively wet winters and hot, dry summers.

Climate data for Calabasas, California
| Month | Jan | Feb | Mar | Apr | May | Jun | Jul | Aug | Sep | Oct | Nov | Dec | Year |
|---|---|---|---|---|---|---|---|---|---|---|---|---|---|
| Record high °F (°C) | 87 (31) | 86 (30) | 89 (32) | 96 (36) | 98 (37) | 104 (40) | 107 (42) | 101 (38) | 114 (46) | 98 (37) | 93 (34) | 81 (27) | 114 (46) |
| Mean daily maximum °F (°C) | 69 (21) | 70 (21) | 74 (23) | 77 (25) | 80 (27) | 86 (30) | 92 (33) | 93 (34) | 91 (33) | 84 (29) | 76 (24) | 68 (20) | 80 (27) |
| Mean daily minimum °F (°C) | 46 (8) | 46 (8) | 49 (9) | 51 (11) | 55 (13) | 60 (16) | 64 (18) | 64 (18) | 62 (17) | 57 (14) | 50 (10) | 44 (7) | 54 (12) |
| Record low °F (°C) | 27 (−3) | 32 (0) | 34 (1) | 37 (3) | 40 (4) | 49 (9) | 51 (11) | 54 (12) | 44 (7) | 43 (6) | 33 (1) | 31 (−1) | 27 (−3) |
| Average precipitation inches (mm) | 3.62 (92) | 4.65 (118) | 2.86 (73) | 1.02 (26) | 0.31 (7.9) | 0.07 (1.8) | 0.02 (0.51) | 0.05 (1.3) | 0.14 (3.6) | 0.93 (24) | 1.34 (34) | 2.76 (70) | 17.77 (451) |
Source 1: MSN.com
Source 2: WeatherForYou.com

=== Communities ===
Below is a list of residential communities within Calabasas, organized by the streets to which they are connected.

- From Parkway Calabasas:
  - Calabasas Hills, Calabasas Park Estates, Westridge, Vista Point, The Oaks.
- From Valley Circle Boulevard/Mulholland Highway:
  - Mulholland Heights, Mulwood, Las Villas, Bellagio, The Ridge, Creekside, Clairidge, Calabasas Country Estates, Calabasas Highlands, Mountain Park, Abercrombie Ranch Estates, Cold Creek, and Park Moderne.
- From Las Virgenes Road:
  - Monte Nido, Deer Springs, Stone Creek, El Encanto, Mont Calabasas, Malibu Canyon Park, The Colony at Calabasas, and Avalon Calabasas (formerly Archstone Calabasas).
- From Lost Hills Road:
  - Calabasas View, Saratoga Hills, Saratoga Ranch, Deer Springs, and Steeplechase.

Mont Calabasas, a community on Las Virgenes Road, was annexed into the city of Calabasas in 2011. Prior to annexation, the neighborhood was located in an unincorporated area of Los Angeles County.

== Demographics ==
Historical population
| Census | Pop. | Note | %± |
|---|---|---|---|
| 2000 | 20,033 | | — |
| 2010 | 23,058 | | 15.1% |
| 2020 | 23,241 | | 0.8% |
| 2023 (est.) | 22,808 | ▼ | −1.9% |
U.S. Decennial Census; 1860–1870 1880-1890; 1900 1910 1920; 1930 1940 1950; 1960 1970 1980; 1990 2000 2010; 2020

Calabasas first appeared as a city in the 2000 U.S. census. Prior to that, the area was part of the unincorporated portion of the Calabasas census county division.

=== Racial and ethnic composition ===
Calabasas city, California – Racial and ethnic composition Note: the US Census treats Hispanic/Latino as an ethnic category. This table excludes Latinos from the racial categories and assigns them to a separate category. Hispanics/Latinos may be of any race.
| Race / Ethnicity (NH = Non-Hispanic) | Pop 2000 | Pop 2010 | Pop 2020 | % 2000 | % 2010 | % 2020 |
|---|---|---|---|---|---|---|
| White alone (NH) | 16,789 | 18,332 | 17,175 | 83.81% | 79.50% | 73.90% |
| Black or African American alone (NH) | 222 | 356 | 515 | 1.11% | 1.54% | 2.22% |
| Native American or Alaska Native alone (NH) | 22 | 30 | 31 | 0.11% | 0.13% | 0.13% |
| Asian alone (NH) | 1,529 | 1,977 | 2,184 | 7.63% | 8.57% | 9.40% |
| Native Hawaiian or Pacific Islander alone (NH) | 7 | 6 | 12 | 0.03% | 0.03% | 0.05% |
| Other race alone (NH) | 56 | 68 | 170 | 0.28% | 0.29% | 0.73% |
| Mixed race or Multiracial (NH) | 459 | 808 | 1,200 | 2.29% | 3.50% | 5.16% |
| Hispanic or Latino (any race) | 949 | 1,481 | 1,954 | 4.74% | 6.42% | 8.41% |
| Total | 20,033 | 23,058 | 23,241 | 100.00% | 100.00% | 100.00% |

=== 2020 census ===
As of the 2020 census, Calabasas had a population of 23,241 and a population density of 1,695.4 inhabitants per square mile (654.6/km^{2}).

The age distribution was 21.2% under the age of 18, 9.4% aged 18 to 24, 19.6% aged 25 to 44, 30.5% aged 45 to 64, and 19.4% aged 65 or older. The median age was 44.9 years. For every 100 females, there were 93.4 males, and for every 100 females age 18 and over there were 90.2 males age 18 and over.

94.1% of residents lived in urban areas, while 5.9% lived in rural areas.

The whole population lived in households. There were 8,850 households, of which 33.4% had children under age 18. Of all households, 55.8% were married-couple households, 4.8% were cohabiting couple households, 14.4% had a male householder with no spouse or partner present, and 25.0% had a female householder with no spouse or partner present. About 21.5% of households were one-person households, and 9.3% had one person aged 65 or older. The average household size was 2.63. There were 6,398 families (72.3% of all households).

There were 9,289 housing units at an average density of 677.6 units per square mile (261.6 units/km^{2}), of which 8,850 (95.3%) were occupied and 4.7% were vacant. Of occupied units, 70.2% were owner-occupied and 29.8% were renter-occupied. The homeowner vacancy rate was 1.0%, and the rental vacancy rate was 7.0%.

=== 2023 ACS estimates ===
In 2023, the US Census Bureau estimated that the median household income was $157,938, and the per capita income was $98,120. About 5.9% of families and 9.2% of the population were below the poverty line.

=== 2010 census ===
The 2010 United States census reported Calabasas to have a population of 23,058. The population density was 1,780.4 inhabitants per square mile (687.4/km^{2}).

The Census reported that 23,049 people lived in households, 9 lived in non-institutionalized group quarters, and none were institutionalized. Of 8,543 households, 3,320 (38.9%) had children under the age of 18 living at home, 5,124 (60.0%) were opposite-sex married couples living together, 942 (11.0%) had a female householder with no husband present, 315 (3.7%) had a male householder with no wife present, 310 (3.6%) were unmarried opposite-sex partnerships, and 31 (0.4%) were same-sex married couples or partnerships. About 1,624 households (19.0%) were made up of individuals, and 525 (6.1%) consisted of someone living alone who was age 65 or older. The average household size was 2.70. There were 6,381 families (74.7% of all households); the average family size was 3.11.

The population consisted of 5,841 people (25.3%) under age 18, 1,875 people (8.1%) age 18 to 24, 5,025 people (21.8%) age 25 to 44, 7,414 people (32.2%) age 45 to 64, and 2,903 people (12.6%) age 65 or older. The median age was 41.6 years. For every 100 females, there were 93.6 males. For every 100 females age 18 and over, there were 89.8 males age 18 and over.

The 8,878 housing units averaged 685.5 per square mile (264.7/km^{2}), of which 6,287 (73.6%) were owner-occupied, and 2,256 (26.4%) were occupied by renters. The homeowner vacancy rate was 1.2%; the rental vacancy rate was 5.2%. Around 17,769 people (77.1% of the population) lived in owner-occupied housing units and 5,280 people (22.9%) lived in rental housing units.

According to the 2010 United States census, Calabasas had a median household income of $124,583, with 6.6% of the population living below the federal poverty line.

=== 2000 census ===
As of 2000, Russian and German were the most common ancestries. Iran and Canada were the most common foreign places of birth.

== Economy ==
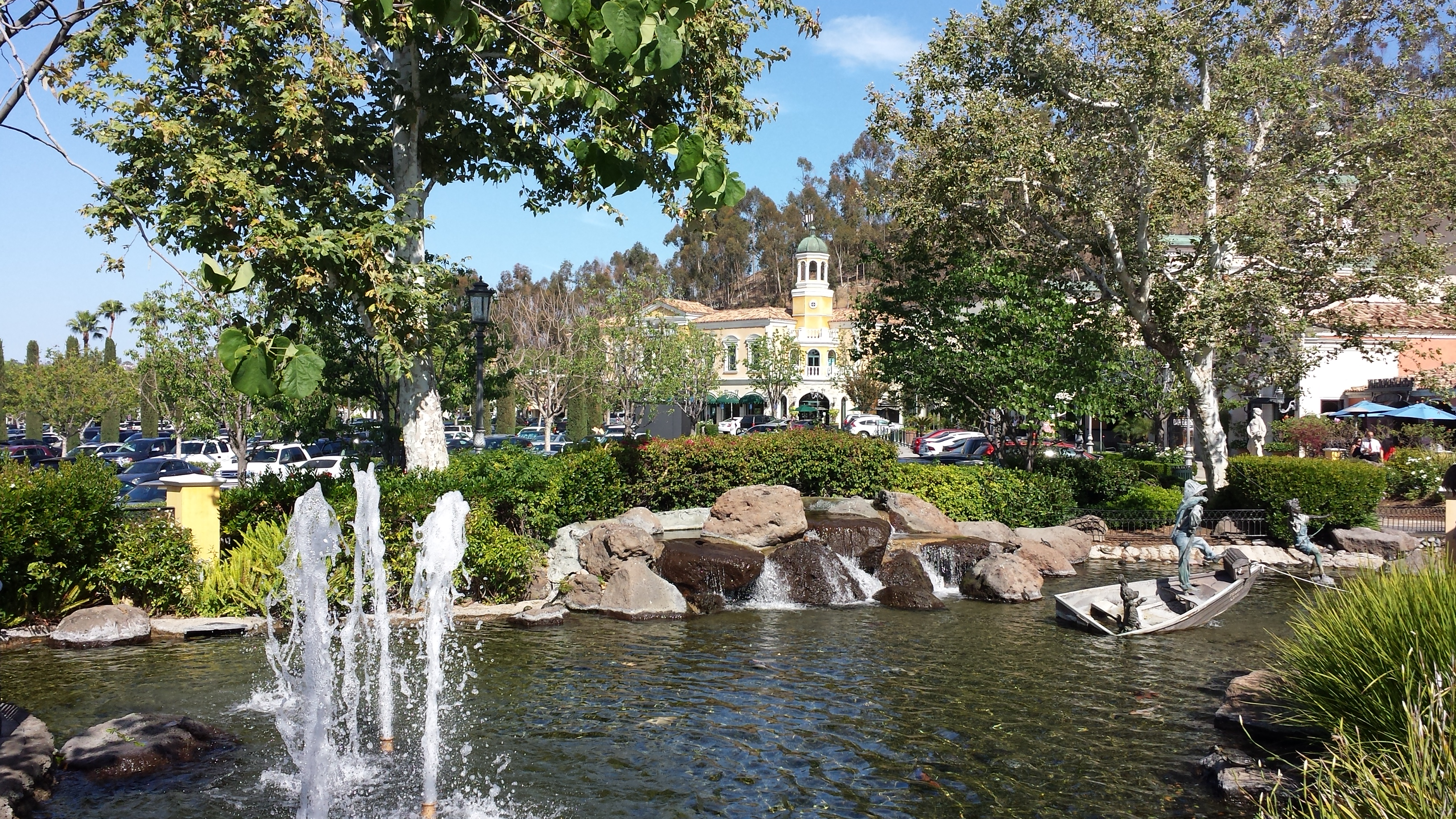
The Commons at Calabasas shopping center

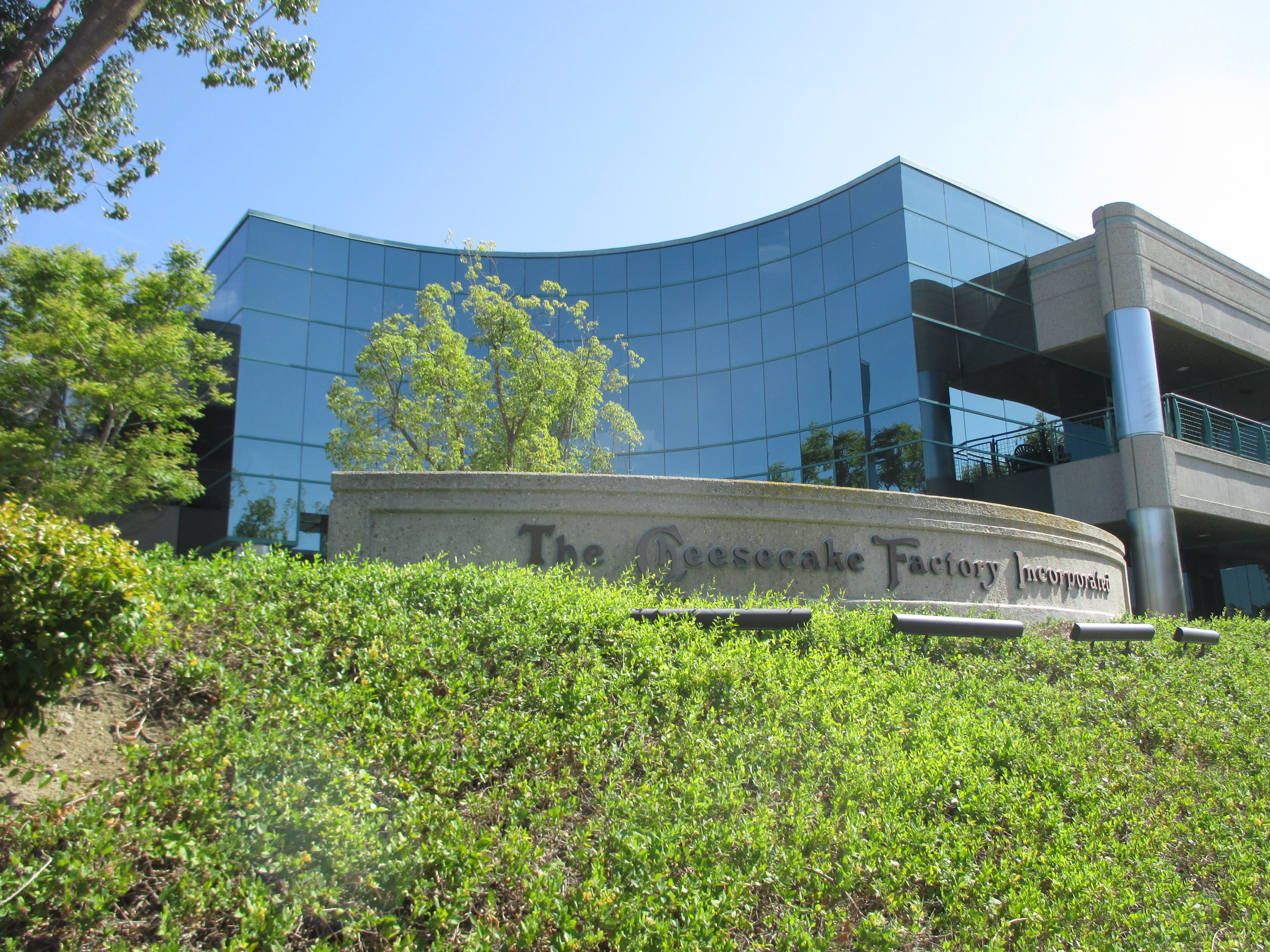
Headquarters of The Cheesecake Factory

The corporate headquarters of Harbor Freight Tools, The Cheesecake Factory, and DTS, Inc. are located in Calabasas. Calabasas is also known as one of the wealthiest cities in the United States.

=== Top employers ===
According to the city's 2025 Annual Comprehensive Financial Report, the top employers in the city are:

| # | Employer | No. of Employees |
|---|---|---|
| 1 | Las Virgenes Unified School District | 1,011 |
| 2 | The Cheesecake Factory | 637 |
| 3 | Harbor Freight Tools | 515 |
| 4 | Viewpoint School | 313 |
| 5 | AmaWaterways | 243 |
| 6 | Pepperdine University | 199 |
| 7 | Keysight Technologies | 172 |
| 8 | Las Virgenes Water District | 125 |
| 9 | Bob Smith BMW & Mini | 119 |
| 10 | Albertsons | 90 |

=== Technology center ===
During the dot-com bubble, a number of technology companies were located on a stretch of Agoura Rd. parallel to the US 101 Freeway, leading that area of Calabasas to develop a reputation as the "101 Technology Corridor". These businesses included several computer networking companies Xylan (later Alcatel-Lucent), Netcom Systems (later Spirent Communications), Ixia Communications, j2 Global Communications, Tekelec, and software company Digital Insight. Although some of these companies have since relocated, been acquired, or ceased operations, the area continues to be home to a significant technology presence.

== Arts and culture ==
=== Annual events ===
The city sponsors many annual events, including:

- The Pumpkin Festival
- Eggstravaganza
- The Fine Arts Festival
- The Fourth of July Spectacular
- The Calabasas Film Festival
- SunSets Concerts

=== Weekly events ===
The Calabasas Farmers Market is held every Saturday from 8:00am to 1:00pm at 23504 Calabasas Road.

=== Tourism ===
==== Claretville of Calabasas / King Gillette Ranch ====
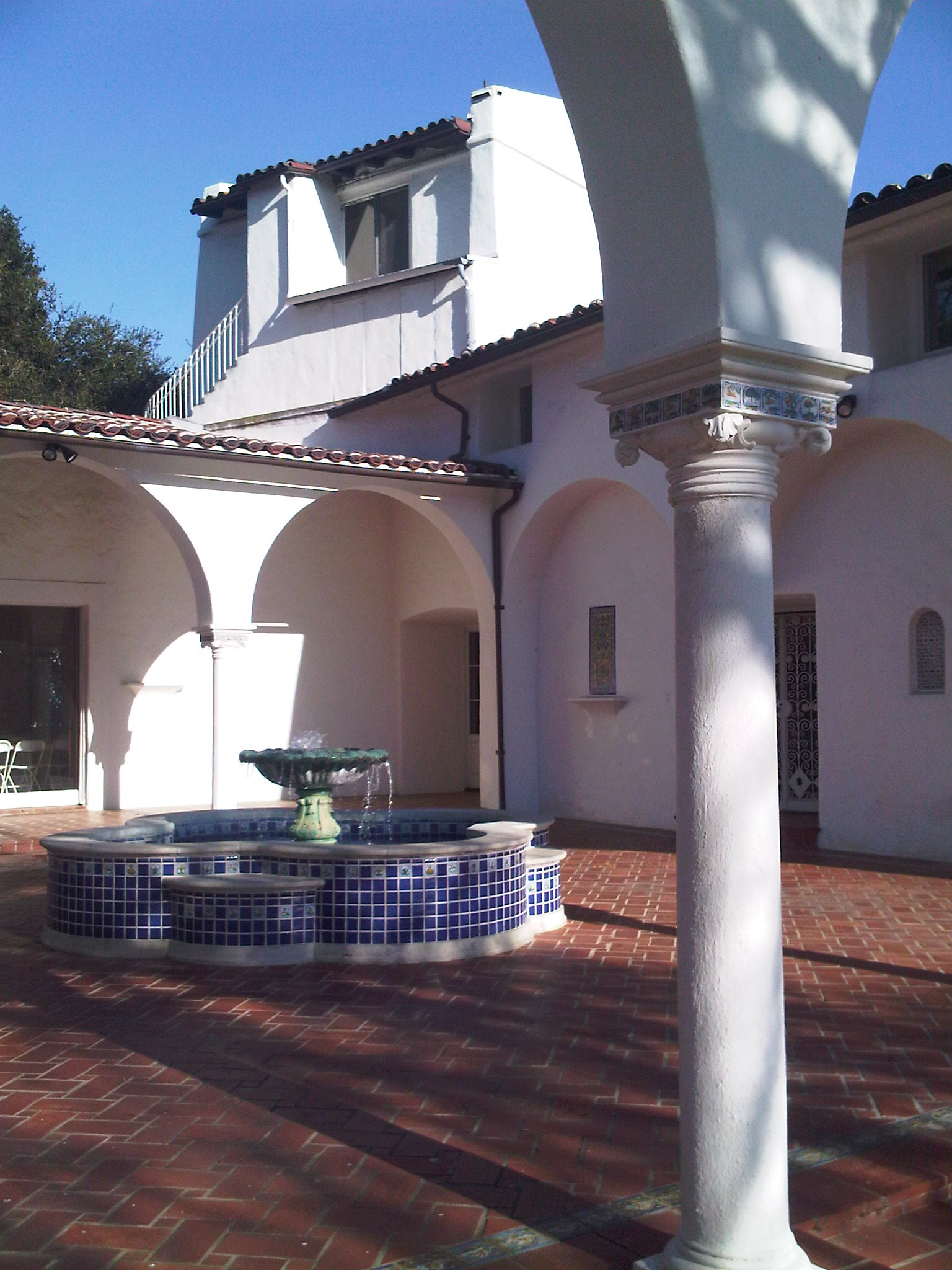
King Gillette Ranch, main residence courtyard, designed by Wallace Neff in the Spanish Colonial Revival architecture style in the 1920s

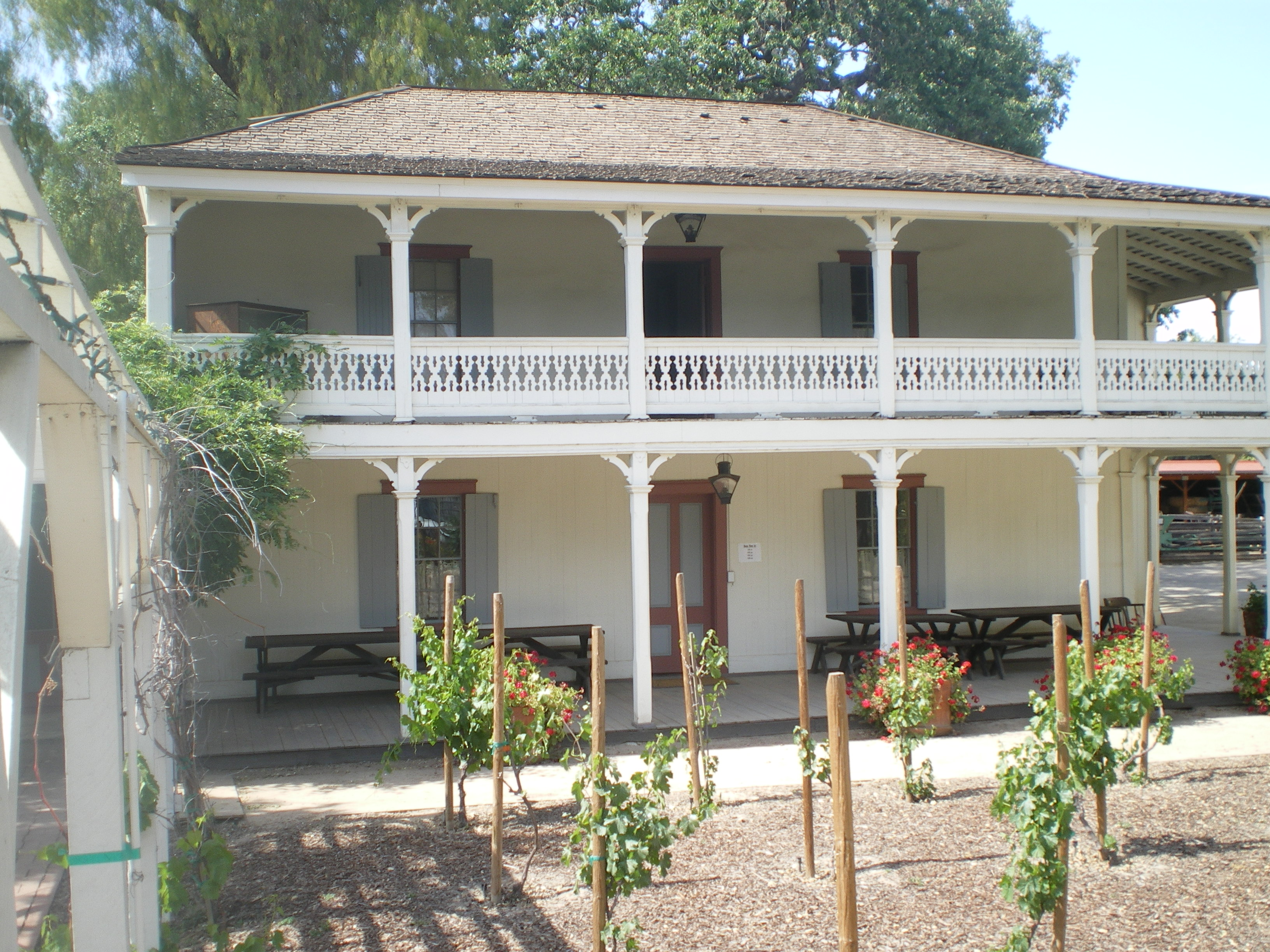
Leonis Adobe in Old Town Calabasas

The Claretians (The Missionary Sons of the Immaculate Heart of Mary in Rome, or The Claretian Order) of the Catholic Church had come to Southern California by way of Mexico in the early 1900s, working in Los Angeles inner-city missions. From 1952 to 1977, they operated the Theological Seminary of Claretville and the Immaculate Heart Claretian Novitiate on the former Gillette Estate, which they renamed Claretville. Thomas Aquinas College rented the Claretville campus from the Claretians from 1971 to 1978. When the Claretians sold their Claretville property in 1978 to Clare Prophet and her Church Universal and Triumphant, Thomas Aquinas College began construction on a permanent campus in Santa Paula, California. The Gillette Estate/Claretville property is known as the King Gillette Ranch and is part of Malibu Creek State Park. The land and historic structures by architect Wallace Neff are at the intersection of Mulholland Highway and Las Virgenes Road in unincorporated Calabasas.

=== Hindu temple ===
The Malibu Hindu Temple, located on Las Virgenes Road in unincorporated Calabasas, is visited by many Hindus and others from both in and outside California. The Hindu Temple Society of Southern California was incorporated in the State of California as a nonprofit religious organization on August 18, 1977.

== Parks and recreation ==
The City of Calabasas Community Services Department operates a number of facilities.

These include:

- Calabasas Senior Center: 300 Civic Center Way
- Calabasas Tennis and Swim Center: 23400 Park Sorrento
- Calabasas Klubhouse and Creekside Park: 3655 Old Topanga Canyon Road
- Juan Bautista de Anza Park: 3701 Lost Hills Road
- Grape Arbor Park: 5100 Parkville Road
- Gates Canyon Park and Brandon's Village: 25801 Thousand Oaks Blvd
- Wild Walnut Park: 23050 Mulholland Highway
- Highlands Park: 23581 Summit Drive
- Calabasas Pickleball Club: 5155 Old Scandia Lane

Brandon's Village is a public playground located at Gates Canyon Park in Calabasas. It serves over 5,000 special needs children from Calabasas and surrounding communities. Designed by Shane's Inspiration, a nonprofit organization that designs and builds universally accessible playgrounds, Brandon's Village is about 1 acre (4,000 m^{2}) in size. Its playground equipment is over 70% independently playable by children with disabilities, and also provides meaningful and stimulating play opportunities for children without disabilities.

Grape Arbor Park is a small park and green space situated on Lost Road Hills off Ventura Freeway in Calabasas, and serves the surrounding residential area. The park includes a baseball diamond, tennis court, sand volleyball court, playground, and picnic tables. In 2018, the park was damaged during the Woolsey Fire, with playground equipment, landscaping, and irrigation needing repair. The park was renovated by the city, with reconstruction being completed in 2020.

Calabasas Bark Park is a small dog park with a grass space and separate gated children's area with water fountains. The park is also connected to a small maintained hiking trail.

Wild Walnut Park is an outdoor preserve located along Mulholland Highway in Calabasas. The park features walking paths and picnic benches. In 2020, a portion of the park was approved for use as a dog park.

== Government ==
City policies are enacted by a five-member city council. Council members serve overlapping four-year terms and are elected at-large, on a non-partisan basis. Each year, the council selects one of its members to act as mayor and preside over city council meetings; a mayor pro tempore is also selected at this time, to serve for one year, concurrent to the mayoral term. While the mayor has additional responsibilities/duties, the mayor is not vested with any additional administrative authority.

The City of Calabasas uses a council-manager model of local government. The city council is primarily responsible for legislative, financial, and political matters, while an appointed city manager serves as the city's chief executive. The city manager is primarily responsible for managing day-to-day operations and providing general oversight. The city manager is appointed by and serves at the pleasure of the city council.

=== Federal and state representation ===
In the California State Legislature, Calabasas is in the 24th senatorial district, represented by Democrat Ben Allen, and in the 42nd Assembly district, represented by Democrat Jacqui Irwin.

In the United States House of Representatives, Calabasas is in California's 26th congressional district, represented by Democrat Julia Brownley.

=== Environmental stewardship ===
In 2005, Calabasas voters overwhelmingly passed Measure D. The ordinance protects and preserves existing areas of open space in Calabasas by requiring two-thirds voter approval before any land in the city designated as open space may be redesignated for another use.

In 2007, the Calabasas City Council adopted Ordinance 2007–233, banning retail food establishments, nonprofit food providers, and city facilities from using food-packaging materials made of expanded polystyrene (Styrofoam). The ordinance requires food-service establishments in Calabasas to use environmentally acceptable packaging starting March 31, 2008, and to report ongoing compliance with this ordinance on the first business day of each calendar year.

In 2011, the City Council passed Ordinance 2011-282 which banned grocery stores, convenience stores (minimarts), liquor stores, drug stores, and pharmacies from furnishing single-use plastic carryout bags. The ordinance also requires that if those businesses furnish paper carryout bags, they must charge customers 10 cents per bag.

=== Second-hand smoke ordinance ===
In February 2006, Calabasas enacted the Comprehensive Second-Hand Smoke Control Ordinance that prohibits smoking in all public places in the City of Calabasas where other persons may be exposed to second-hand smoke. These places include indoor and outdoor businesses, hotels, parks, apartment common areas, restaurants, and bars where people can be reasonably expected to congregate or meet. Under the law, smoking outdoors in public areas within the city is restricted to select "designated smoking areas". The law went into effect on March 16, 2006, garnering much local and national media attention. The full text of the ordinance may be found at Calabasas' official website. The ordinance was expanded in early 2008, requiring 80% of rental apartment buildings to be permanently designated as non-smoking units by January 1, 2012.

== Education ==
Calabasas residents are zoned to schools in the Las Virgenes Unified School District. The district also serves the nearby communities of Agoura Hills, Bell Canyon, and Hidden Hills, and certain smaller areas. Calabasas High School is a part of the district.

In January 2004, Alice C. Stelle Middle School, located at the corner of Mulholland Highway and Paul Revere Road, was opened to serve the eastern half of the city. The western half is served by Arthur E. Wright Middle School, located on Las Virgenes Road, which prior to 2004, was the city's only middle school.

Calabasas is also home to Chaparral, Round Meadow, Lupin Hill, and Bay Laurel public elementary schools, which are part of the Las Virgenes Unified School District, as well as the private Viewpoint School.

== Infrastructure ==
=== Public services ===
Calabasas funds its own public transportation in the form of a shuttle and trolley service. It augments the service provided by the Los Angeles County Metropolitan Transportation Authority and funds its own municipal library (as opposed to participating in the Los Angeles County library system), runs the Calabasas Tennis and Swim Center, Creekside Klubhouse, public parks, and has a protected and maintained historical district called "Old Town Calabasas".

Calabasas has two branches of the United States Postal Service, located in Suite 10 at 4774 Park Granada and at the Malibu Shell Post Office at 4807 Las Virgenes Road.

The City of Calabasas contracts with the County of Los Angeles to provide emergency services.

The Los Angeles County Sheriff's Department operates the Malibu/Lost Hills Station at 27050 Agoura Road in Calabasas.

The Los Angeles County Fire Department provides medical and fire suppression services to Calabasas. LACFD operates two stations in the City of Calabasas located at 5215 Las Virgines Road, and 24130 Calabasas Road.

== In popular culture ==
Calabasas Park Golf Club sits where Warner Bros. Ranch was located. Films shot there include Showboat (1951), High Noon (1952), Calamity Jane (1953), Stalag 17 (1953), and Carousel (1956).

On January 26, 2020, a helicopter crash in Calabasas claimed the lives of nine people, including Los Angeles Lakers basketball player Kobe Bryant and his 13-year-old daughter Gianna Bryant.

New York Times bestselling author Lee Goldberg lives in Calabasas, and his 2020 novel Lost Hills, the first in a series of books about Detective Eve Ronin, the youngest homicide detective in the history of the Los Angeles County Sheriff's Department, is set there. The novel was followed by Bone Canyon, Gated Prey, and Movieland, Dream Town, Fallen Star (a finalist for the Sue Grafton Award from the Mystery Writers of America and loosely inspired by the Kobe Bryant helicopter crash) and Split Screen (coming October 2026). The series is set in and around Calabasas and is currently being developed as a TV series. His three Sharpe & Walker novels -- Malibu Burning, Ashes Never Lie and Hidden in Smoke—are about a team of LASD arson investigators and also take place in Calabasas.

In addition, the family of Kate O'Hare, the heroine of the five New York Times bestselling "Fox & O'Hare" thrillers that Goldberg co-wrote with Janet Evanovich, lives in Calabasas.

The titular character of the TV show Ray Donovan lives in Calabasas with his wife and two children.

== Notable people ==
- Charlie Adler, actor, director
- Shohreh Aghdashloo, actress, author
- Michael Ansara, actor
- Shiri Appleby, actor
- Adrienne Bailon, singer, actress, host
- Alabama Barker, singer
- Brandon Boyd, musician, singer
- Marcia Clark, prosecutor, author, television correspondent
- Dr. Dre, rapper and producer (previously)
- Donna Feldman, model and actress
- Jonathan Frakes, actor, director
- Timothy Gibbs, director and actor
- Lee Goldberg, author, screenwriter, publisher, producer
- D. L. Hughley, actor, commentator, radio host, author, comedian
- Kris Jenner, television personality (previously)
- Kylie Jenner, television personality (previously)
- Ken Jeong, actor and comedian
- Khloé Kardashian, television personality (previously)
- Kim Kardashian, television personality (previously)
- Kourtney Kardashian, television personality
- Michael Kuluva, fashion designer
- Ben Lederman, footballer
- Keiran Lee, actor, director, producer
- Richard Matheson, sci-fi author
- José Pasillas, musician
- Jake Paul, YouTube personality, boxer
- Ed Shaughnessy, musician
- Will Smith, actor
- Daniel Steres, professional soccer player
- Joni Eareckson Tada, author
- Elizabeth Wagmeister, journalist and reporter
- Jordyn Woods, model and entrepreneur
- David Yarovesky, film director, screenwriter, producer, editor, actor

== Sister cities ==
- Anqing, Anhui, China
- Mevaseret Zion, Jerusalem District, Israel

== See also ==
- Canoga Park, Los Angeles
- Flora of the Santa Monica Mountains
- History of the San Fernando Valley to 1915
- Los Angeles Pet Memorial Park
- Rancho El Escorpión
- West Hills, Los Angeles
