= Justin Caruso =

American DJ and record producer

- Origin: Los Angeles, California, U.S.
- Genres: EDM; trap; future bass
- Occupations: DJ; record producer
- Instrument: Digital audio workstation
- Years active: 2014—present
- Labels: Seeking Blue; BLUME

Justin Caruso is an American DJ and record producer based in Los Angeles. He is the son of billionaire businessman Rick Caruso.

== Discography ==
=== Singles ===
==== 2017 ====
- "Talk About Me"
- "Love Somebody"
- "Caving"

==== 2018 ====
- "You Got Me" (with Tiësto)
- "More Than a Stranger" (featuring Cappa and Ryan Hicari)
- "High Enough" (featuring Rosie Darling)
- "Don't Know You" (featuring Jake Miller)

==== 2019 ====
- "Better With You" (with 3lau featuring Iselin)
- "Feels So Good" (with Tiësto featuring Kelli-Leigh)
- "Good Parts" (featuring Mædi)
- "Can't Live Without" (Justin Caruso & Wyn Starks)

==== 2020 ====
- "No Eyes On Me"
- "Highs & Lows"

==== 2021 ====
- "Intoxicated" (Drove & Justin Caruso)

=== Remixes ===
- 3lau and Justin Caruso – "Better with You" (VIP Remix)
- 7715 – "Week"
- Marshmello and Anne-Marie – "FRIENDS"
- Two Friends – "With My Homies"
- Oliver Heldens – "Fire in My Soul"
- Kim Petras – "Can't Do Better"
- The Chainsmokers - "Everybody Hates Me"
- The Chainsmokers – "Until You Were Gone"
- Kap Slap and Gazzo – "Rewind"
- Cash Cash – "Aftershock"
- X Ambassadors – "Unsteady"
- Gryffin – "Heading Home"
- The Chainsmokers – "Closer"
- Blink-182 – "All The Small Things"
- Hayley Kiyoko – "Palace"
- Martin Garrix and Bebe Rexha – "In The Name of Love"
- Ben E. King – "Stand By Me"
- The Who – "Baba O'Riley"
- Zedd featuring Selena Gomez – "I Want You To Know"
- Ellie Goulding – "Army"
- 3lau – "Is It Love"
- Lana Del Rey – "High by the Beach"
- Justin Bieber – "What Do You Mean"
- Krewella - "Parachute"
