= The Commons at Calabasas =

Mall in Calabasas, California

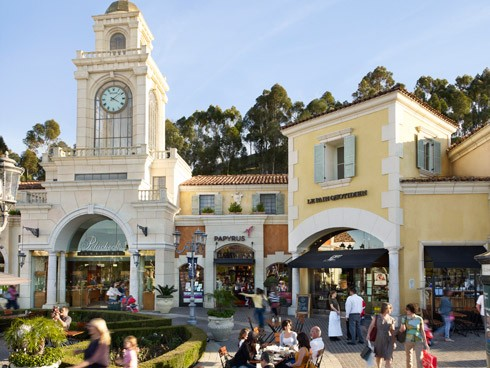
- The Commons at Calabasas
- Location: Calabasas, California
- Coordinates: 34.15355°N 118.6444°W
- Address: 4799 Commons Way Calabasas, CA 91302
- Opened: November 1998
- Developer: Caruso Affiliated
- Owner: Caruso Affiliated
- Architect: F+A Architects
- Floor area: 215,000 sq ft (20,000 m^{2})
- Floors: 1
- Website: www.shopcommons.com

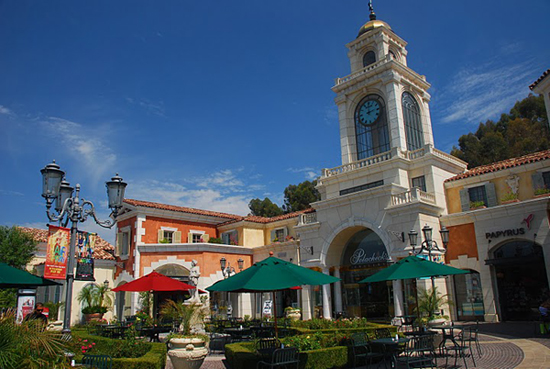
World's largest Rolex clock at The Commons at Calabasas

The Commons at Calabasas is a retail and entertainment complex in Calabasas, California, United States. Built, owned, and operated by Rick J. Caruso and his company Caruso Affiliated, the complex features Barnes & Noble, See's Candies, and Lululemon. It is a tourist destination as celebrities are frequently seen at the high-end shopping center.

== History ==
Development of the upscale retail and entertainment complex began with a vision of an Umbrian village, complementing the community's Mediterranean style. Caruso Affiliated want to build a shopping center that could serve as a town center for the city of Calabasas. The Commons at Calabasas opened in 1998 as a high-end outdoor mall. The theater closed at the end of 2025 with demolition and new construction to begin in early 2026. The redevelopment plan adds housing to the center.

== Design ==
The 215,000-square-foot (20,000 m^{2}) outdoor marketplace is located in Calabasas in Los Angeles County, California. Caruso Affiliated was designed resembled a hill town of the Umbria region in rural Italy. Renovated to be a retail resort, its 40 tenants provide everyday needs, lifestyle/specialty shops, and entertainment. The high-end retail stores, restaurants and entertainment choices are set against the hillsides of Calabasas, one of the wealthiest communities in California.

== Gallery ==
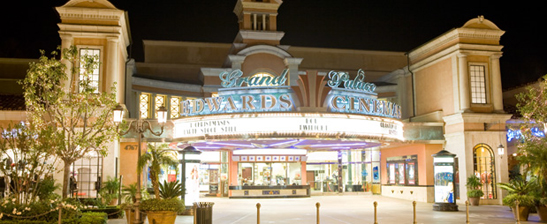
Edwards Calabasas Stadium 6 Movie Theater

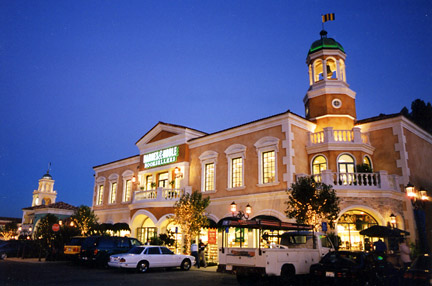
Barnes & Noble
