= Wisconsin State Capitol Holiday Tree =

Decorated pine tree at the Wisconsin State Capitol

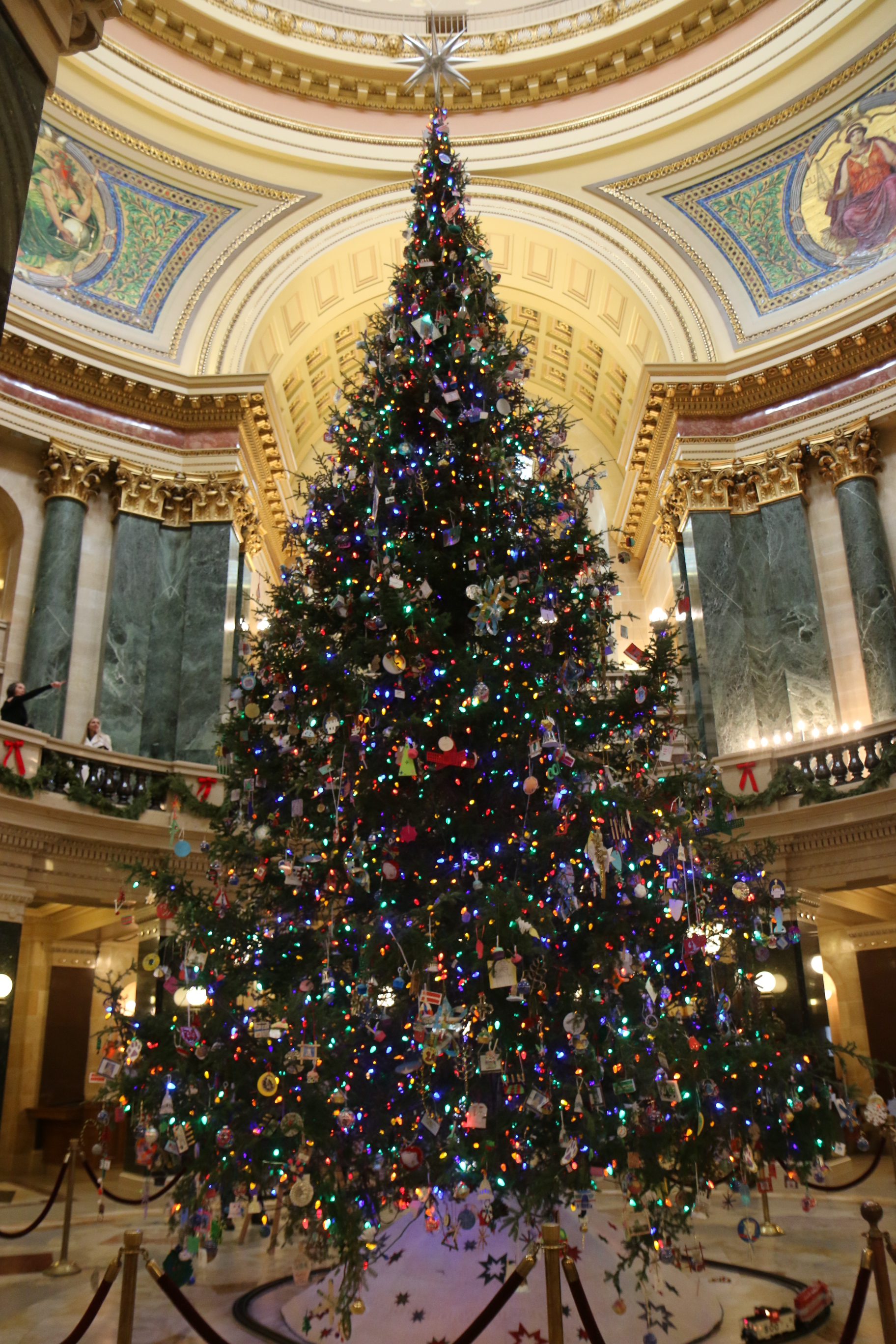
2017 Wisconsin Capitol Christmas Tree

The Wisconsin State Capitol Holiday Tree (1985–2011; 2019–present), previously known as the Wisconsin State Capitol Christmas Tree (1916–1985; 2011–2019) is a decorated pine tree that is placed at the Wisconsin State Capitol in Madison, Wisconsin and decorated with ornaments on a specific theme made by school children across the state (2019's theme was "Science"). The tree is on display throughout the Christmas and holiday season. The tradition began in 1916 and continues to this day.

== History ==
The tradition first began in 1916, when the Department of Administration of the Wisconsin Capitol undertook the erection and decoration of the tree each year from late November to early January.

=== Naming controversy ===
Like many other American city-endorsed Christmas tree lightings, the name of the tree has been controversially changed on more than one occasion. It was first renamed from its original name to "holiday tree" in 1985, to "avoid perceptions that [they] were endorsing religion". In 2007, the state assembly passed a resolution to call the tree a "Christmas tree", but it was ultimately never passed. Former Wisconsin governor Scott Walker declared the tree a "Christmas tree" when he took office in 2011, reverting to the original name. In 2019, new governor Tony Evers made the decision to revert to the "holiday tree" name.

== See also ==
- Christmas
- Holiday
- Christmas tree
- Capitol Christmas Tree
- California Capitol Christmas Tree
