= Grove Christmas Tree =

Christmas tree in Los Angeles, California, USA

Coordinates: 34.072°N 118.358°W

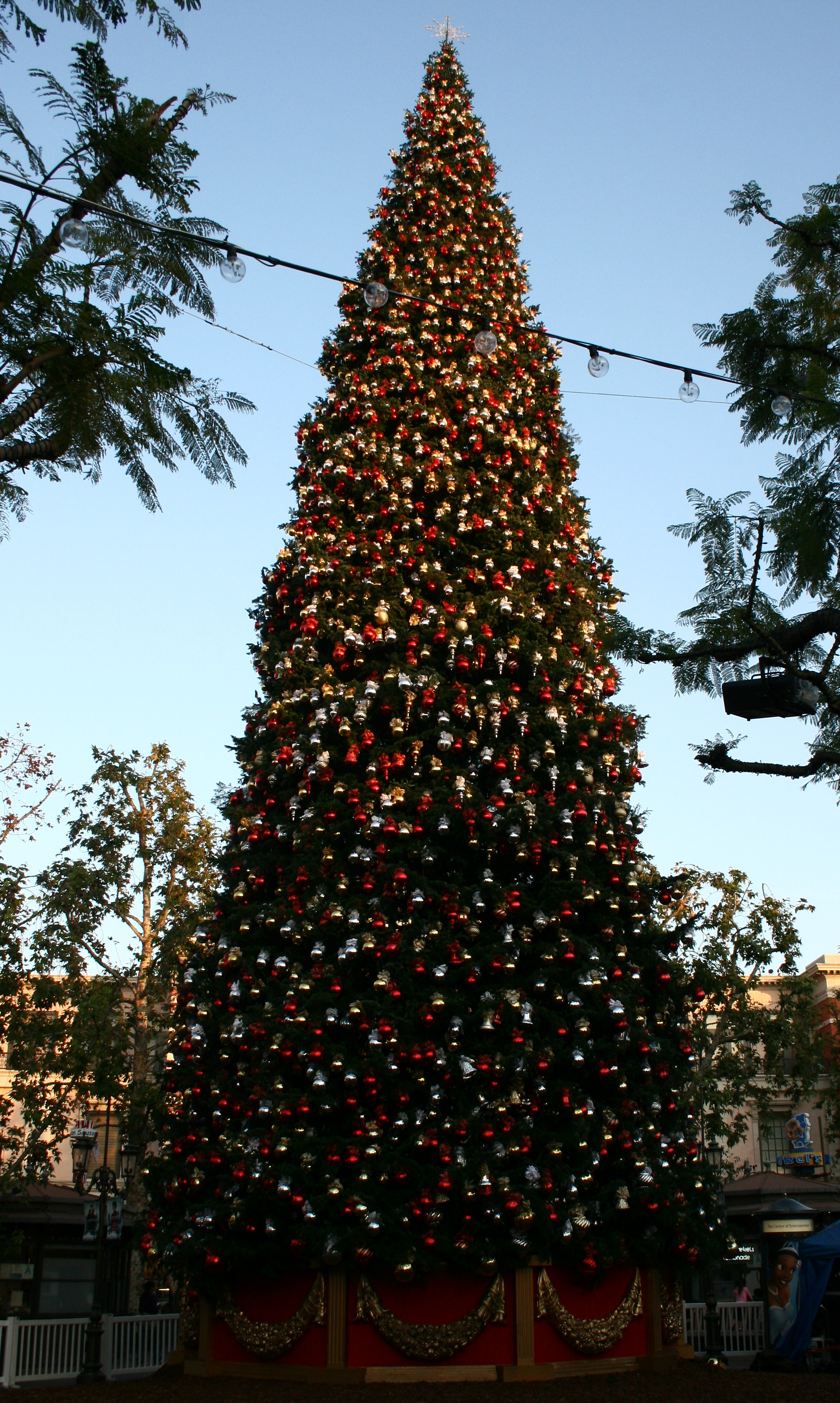
The Grove Christmas Tree in November 2009

The Grove Christmas Tree is an approximately 100 feet (30 m) Christmas tree that is lit every year at The Grove at Farmer's Market in Los Angeles, California. In 2002, it was the tallest Christmas tree in the Los Angeles area and attracted about 90,000 visitors a day during the holiday season.

== History ==
The tradition of lighting The Grove Christmas Tree takes place in mid-November after it was begun in 2002 by real estate developer and businessman Rick J. Caruso. He aimed to make the tree the centerpiece of his retail and entertainment complex, The Grove in Los Angeles, during the Christmas season. In time, the popularity of the annual lighting ceremony eventually rivaled that of the famed Rockefeller Center Christmas Tree lighting in Midtown Manhattan, New York. The Grove Christmas Tree measures 100 feet (30 m) while the Rockefeller Center tree is only about 90 feet (27 m).

The first white fir tree used for the event was harvested from the Mount Shasta region in Northern California in 2010. The following year, a 100-foot white fir was decorated with more than 10,000 lights and 15,000 ornaments, setting the precedent for successive Christmas trees for The Grove at Farmers Market.

== Tree Lighting ==
Among the performers who have graced the event are operatic acts Il Divo and Jackie Evancho, pop singers The Backstreet Boys, Michael Bolton, Far East Movement, Colbie Caillat, Sean Kingston, Gavin DeGraw, and Robin Thicke as well as American Idol alumni Lauren Alaina, Scotty McCreery, and Phillip Phillips. Caruso’s Top Hats Dancers Rachel Montez Collins and Kathryn Burns have also showcased their famous act. Actor and celebrity insider Mario Lopez hosts the annual celebration.

For the 10th anniversary of the Christmas tree lighting, The Grove partnered with the Make-A-Wish Foundation for its “Season of Wishes” campaign. Christmas lights and baubles covered the white fir tree as well as everything else at The Grove. The evening showcased artificial snowfall, bubbles, and a fireworks finale.

KCBS-TV, the Los Angeles area affiliate (and West Coast flagship station) of CBS, televised The Grove Christmas Tree lighting live every year until 2020. After CBS took over broadcasting the National Christmas Tree lighting in 2021, Fox West Coast flagship KTTV took over broadcast rights. It is syndicated to hundreds of television stations across the United States, including most of the Fox network's owned-and-operated stations and other affiliates as well.

== See also ==
- Rockefeller Center Christmas Tree
- Rich's Great Tree
- National Christmas Tree
- California Capitol Christmas Tree
- Hollywood Christmas Parade
- Capitol Christmas Tree
- White House Christmas tree
- Vatican Christmas Tree
- List of individual trees
