= Milwaukee City Christmas Tree =

Public Christmas tree in Milwaukee, Wisconsin, USA

Coordinates: 43°02′28.3″N 87°54′34.6″W

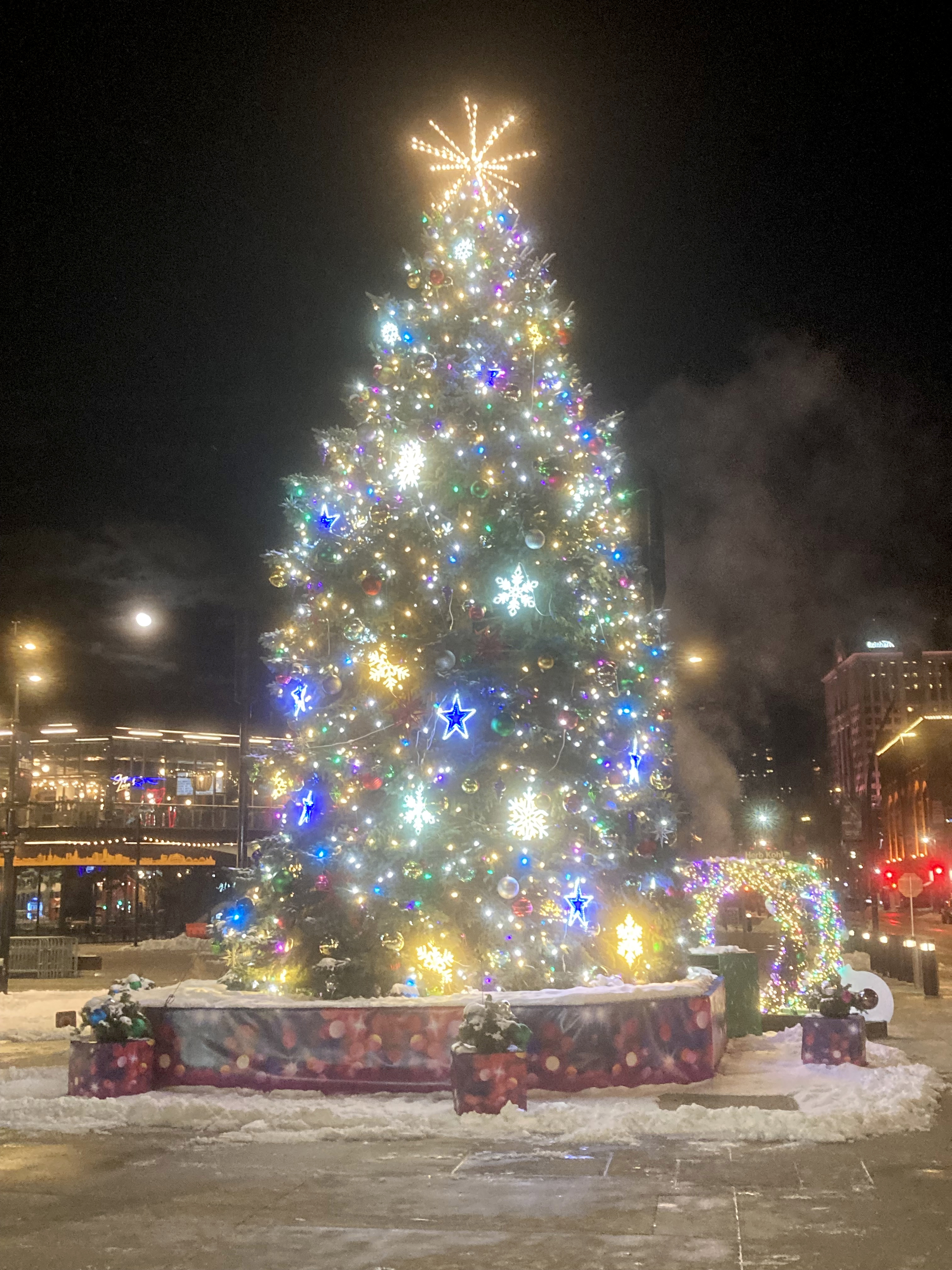
Milwaukee City Christmas Tree in 2025

The Milwaukee City Christmas Tree (1913–1995; 2006–present), also known as Milwaukee City Holiday Tree (1995–2006) is a pine tree that is placed at city hall and decorated by the city council of Milwaukee, Wisconsin, during the Christmas holiday season. The tradition began in 1913 and continues to this day.

== History ==
The city’s Christmas tree tradition began in 1913. One tree that went on display, a Colorado Blue Spruce, had been a housewarming gift 30 years earlier for a couple who had moved into their new home.

Another tree donated had been planted to honor a son who was killed in a car crash. The son’s ashes were mixed in the dirt used to plant the tree.

In 2008, the chosen tree broke and arrived at the lighting ceremony in two pieces. For the 100th anniversary celebration in 2013, the Christmas tree was a 40-foot Colorado Blue Spruce donated by the Loving Shepherd Lutheran Church and School.

== Selecting the official Christmas Tree ==
Residents within the City of Milwaukee are asked to nominate a Christmas tree for the holidays. The shortlisted trees are then judged for their size, shape, uniformity, density, and color. The ideal tree must be between 30 and 40 feet (9.1 and 12.2 m) tall and accessible for harvest with a crane.

== Activities/Pre-activities ==
The Christmas tree lighting ceremony usually starts at 5:15PM (17:15 CT) and is held at Red Arrow Park. In 2011, guest performers included American Idol finalist and Milwaukee native Naima Adedapo, while John McGivern, a local comedian and presenter, served as master of ceremonies.

In 2013, for the event's 100th Anniversary, pre-activities began at 4:30PM (16:30 CT), with music provided by the Lincoln Center of the Arts Ambassador Choir, the Salvation Army Brass Ensemble, and the Milwaukee Repertory Theater's A Christmas Carol cast. Special guests included characters from Milwaukee Ballet's Nutcracker and the Milwaukee Children's Choir. Refreshments for the celebration were provided by Starbucks.

== Naming controversy ==
Like many other city-endorsed Christmas tree lightings, the tree lighting in Milwaukee was labeled "holiday" rather than "Christmas" in 1995 so as not to "offend non-Christians". In 2004 and 2005, many cities reversed their decision and re-labeled the tree as "Christmas" rather than the generic "holiday". Examples include the Capitol Christmas Tree and the California Capitol Christmas Tree. In October 2006, with a 9–5 vote, Milwaukee city council decided to rename the decade's old "Holiday tree" to a "Christmas Tree".

== See also ==
- Christmas
- Holiday
- Christmas tree
- Capitol Christmas Tree
- California Capitol Christmas Tree
