= The Grove at Farmers Market =

Shopping mall in Los Angeles, California

The Grove
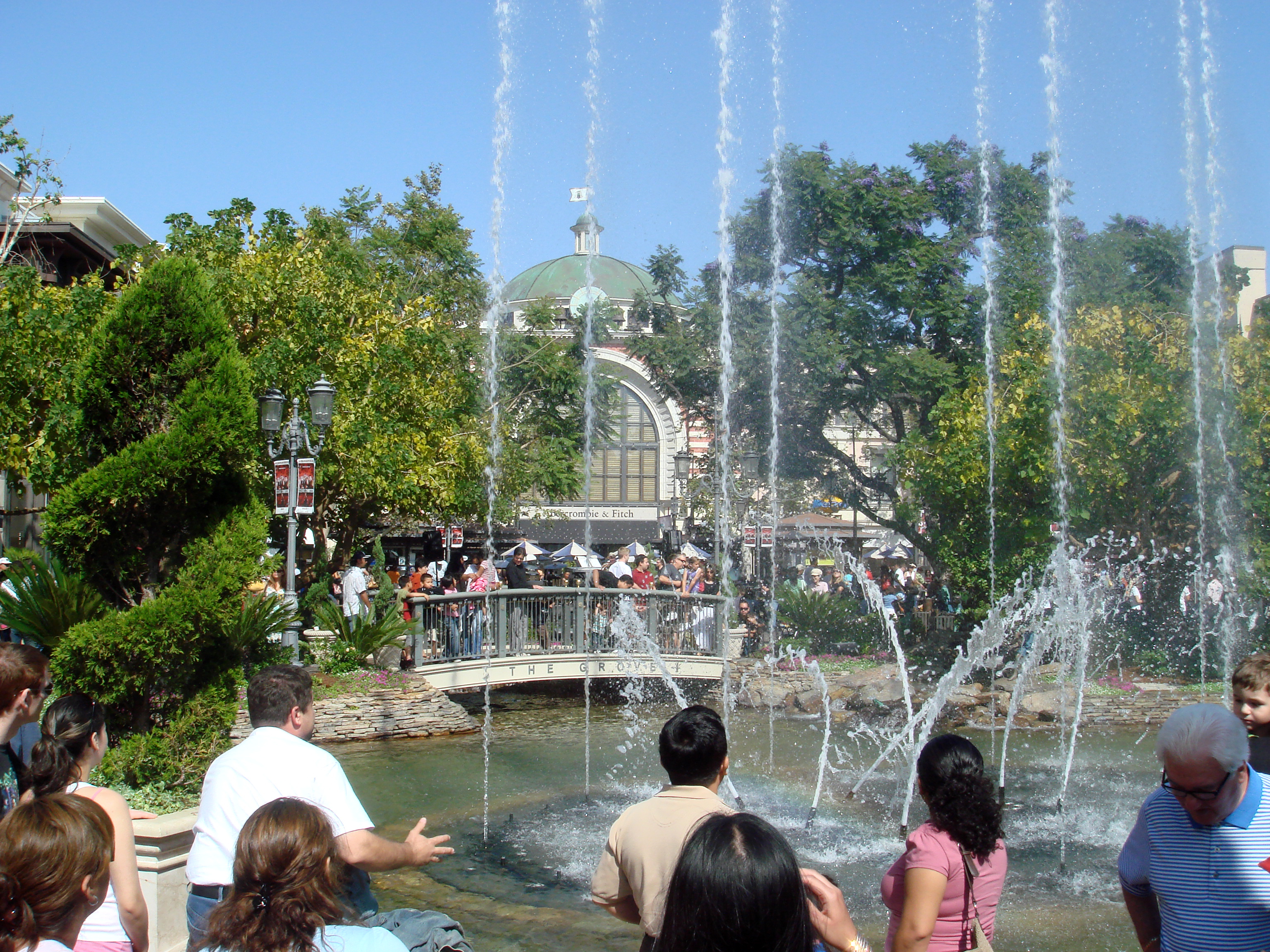
- The animated fountains at The Grove
- Location: Los Angeles
- Coordinates: 34.071964°N 118.357515°W
- Address: 189 The Grove Drive; Los Angeles, CA 90036
- Opened: February 2002; 24 years ago
- Developer: Caruso
- Owner: Rick Caruso
- Architect: David Williams; Elkus Manfredi
- Num. of anchor tenants: 1
- Floor area: 600,000 sq ft (56,000 m^{2})
- Floors: 2
- Public transit: Wilshire/Fairfax; 16, 316, 17, 217, 780
- Website: www.thegrovela.com

The trolley takes shoppers on a short ride from The Grove to Farmer's Market

The Grove is a retail and entertainment complex in Los Angeles, located on parts of the historic Farmers Market. The mall features Nordstrom and Barnes & Noble. It is owned by Caruso, the real estate company of American businessman Rick Caruso.

== History ==
The complex fills space previously occupied by surface parking lots, an orchard and nursery, which were the last remains of a dairy farm owned by A. F. Gilmore in the latter part of the 19th century. The developers began demolition of an antiques alley and other older buildings on Third Street behind CBS Television City, and broke ground for the new mall in 1999. There was some controversy over potentially increasing traffic in a busy Los Angeles neighborhood that already offered several other shopping venues, including the Beverly Center. The Grove opened in 2002.

The Warner Bros. tabloid television news program Extra was taped in the complex from 2010-2013, usually on the mall's lawn area.

From November 2015 to November 2017, it served as a venue for the fall finales of Dancing with the Stars.

The history behind the development of the A. F. Gilmore property that eventually became The Grove was not without controversy. In 1984, A. F. Gilmore and neighboring CBS Television City hired Olympia & York California Equities Corp. to look into the possibility of creating a major business and entertainment complex that would have been twice as large as Universal City but would have required the demolition of all existing structures at both Farmers Market and CBS in the process. That plan was not well received by the City of Los Angeles or by its neighbors and the plan was later shelved. Two years later A. F. Gilmore and CBS hired Urban Investment & Development Co. of Chicago to create another development plan.

In 1989, A. F. Gilmore announced that it was going to build a US$300 million mall adjacent to the existing Farmers Market and that the new project would be managed by JMB/Urban Development of Chicago. The proposed mall was going to be anchored by May Company California, Nordstrom, and J. W. Robinson's along with over 100 other stores. Later, the project was scaled down to 2 anchors.

During the next decade, A. F. Gilmore announced in 1998 a further scaled down plan with Caruso Affiliated as the new development partner for a new proposal that eventually became The Grove at Farmers Market, a $100-million project on 25 acres (10 ha). Nordstrom signed on in 2001 to build a 122,000 sq ft (11,300 m^{2}) store. By early 2001, toy retailer FAO Schwarz also sign on for 25,000 sq ft (2,300 m^{2}) along with Banana Republic, Gap, Barnes & Noble, J. Crew (now closed), Maggiano's Little Italy restaurant and a 14-screen movie complex to be the initial stores in the new project. After many delays, the retail center finally opened in March 2002.

FAO Schwarz was one of the first retail casualties at the Grove after FAO Schwarz's parent company had to declare bankruptcy in 2004. The Grove was able to replace the store with American Girl Place, which opened in April 2006. Abercrombie & Fitch closed their flagship store in February 2015, and was replaced seven months later with a Nike flagship store that opened in September 2015. Also in 2013, Banana Republic moved into a new space at the mall, and the old space was occupied by a Topshop/Topman store.

In the original plan, the 14-screen movie complex was going to be built by Pacific Theatres to be its first Arc Light multiplex. At the last minute, Pacific Theatres pulled out of the project and opted to build the multiplex in Hollywood, ArcLight Hollywood, instead. Caruso decided to fund the construction of the multiplex out of the company's own pockets. After 10 months of successful operations, Caruso decided to sell the multiplex outright. Pacific gave the highest bid at US$30 million.

In May 2020, The Grove was damaged during protests over the murder of George Floyd. Caruso responded with an open letter that made a point of supporting the cause of the demonstrators, but criticized unspecified Los Angeles officials who failed to prevent violence that damaged many small businesses along the nearby streets that may never reopen.

Pacific Theatres permanently ceased operations in 2021 due to the economic fallout of the COVID-19 pandemic. AMC Theatres acquired the lease to the Pacific Theatres locations at The Grove and Americana at Brand in July 2021.

== Design ==
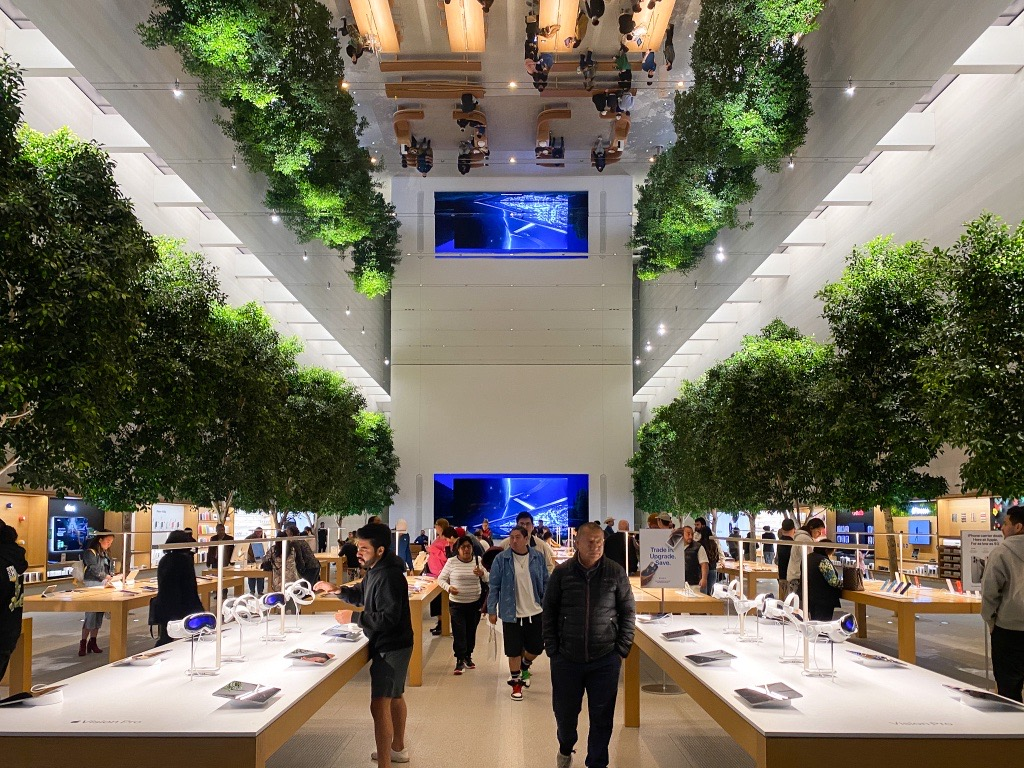
Apple Store at The Grove designed by Foster and Partners

The 575,000-square-foot (53,400 m^{2}) outdoor marketplace is located in Los Angeles' Fairfax District. Initial architectural design was performed in-house by David Williams of Caruso Affiliated Holdings and by KMD Architects of San Francisco. Caruso Affiliated claims to have modeled its architectural designs on indigenous Los Angeles buildings, influenced by classic historic districts, with shopping alleys, broad plazas, and intimate courtyards. The design features a series of Art Deco-style false fronts, with boxy interiors similar to those found in other contemporary stores.

Other critics opined the inward facing design does not incorporate the surrounding neighborhood and fails to connect to the Pan Pacific Park, the adjacent apartment complexes and Fairfax and Third St. facing businesses. The development design was to focus on patrons arriving by car to the 3500 parking structure.

== Attractions ==
The Grove features a large central park with an animated fountain designed by WET. Its music-fountain show plays every hour, though the feature has a non-musical program in between shows. The water's choreography is reminiscent of the Fountains of Bellagio in Las Vegas—also designed by WET—but on a much smaller scale.

The property also has a statue, The Spirit of Los Angeles. Live shows are often performed there—on the grassy area by the fountains. An internal transit system uses electric-powered trolley cars to link The Grove and the adjacent Farmers Market.

The Farmers Market features 28 restaurants offering a diverse selection of cuisines, including American, Mexican, Asian/Pacific, Brazilian, Cajun, French, Greek/Middle Eastern, Italian, Japanese, Korean, and seafood.

== Christmas tree ==
In mid-November, the Grove Christmas Tree is displayed, and lit every evening, beginning with the annual tree lighting ceremony. The tree remains lit every evening for the remainder of the Christmas season. Usually up to 100 feet (30 m) or more, it is one of the tallest Christmas trees in the Los Angeles area. In more recent years, The Grove also transforms "into a winter wonderland" where artificial snow falls every evening at 7 & 8 pm, through Christmas Eve.

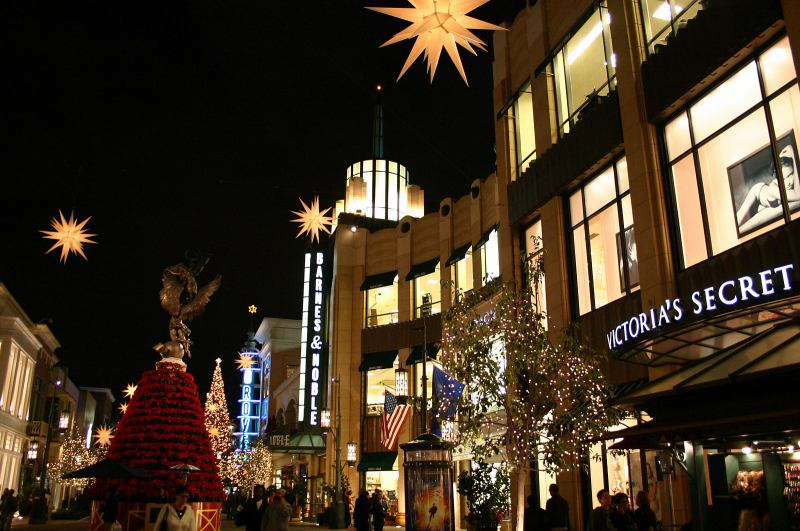
The Grove at night during the holiday season

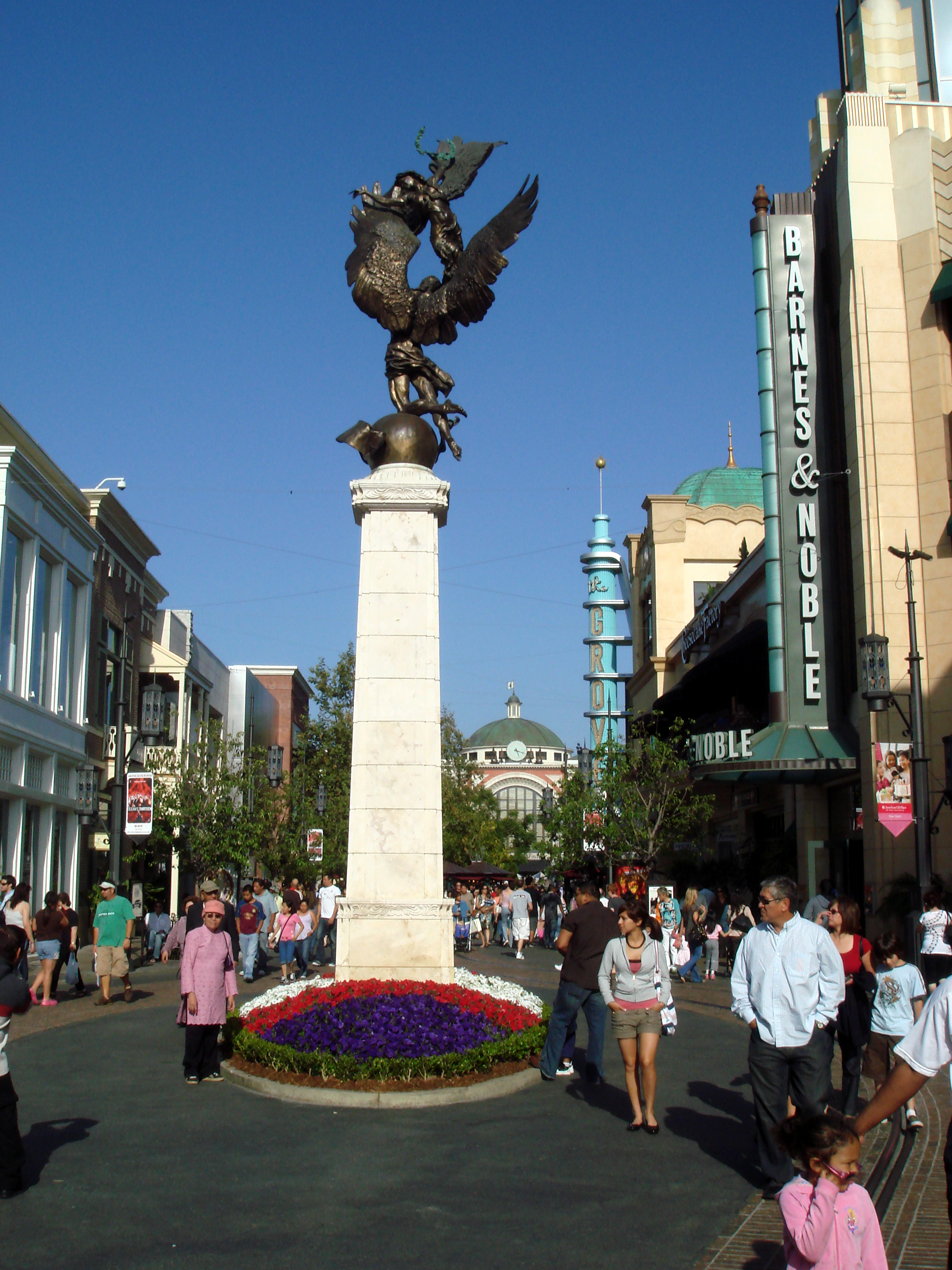
Main Street at The Grove, "The Spirit of Los Angeles" monument by De L'Esprie.

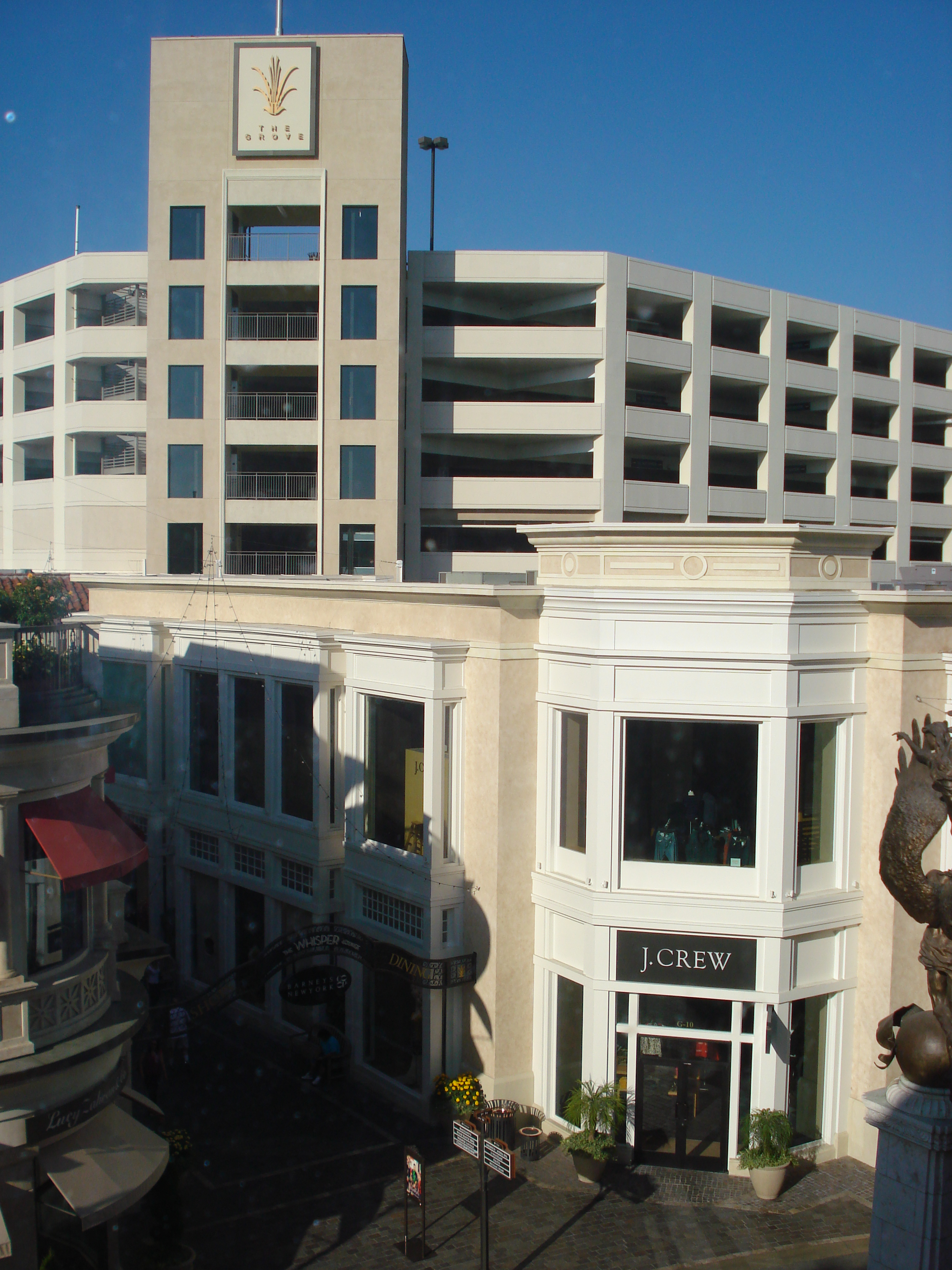
The Grove parking structure with J.Crew
