= Rockefeller Center Christmas Tree =

Christmas tree placed annually in Rockefeller Center

Coordinates: 40°45′31″N 73°58′42″W

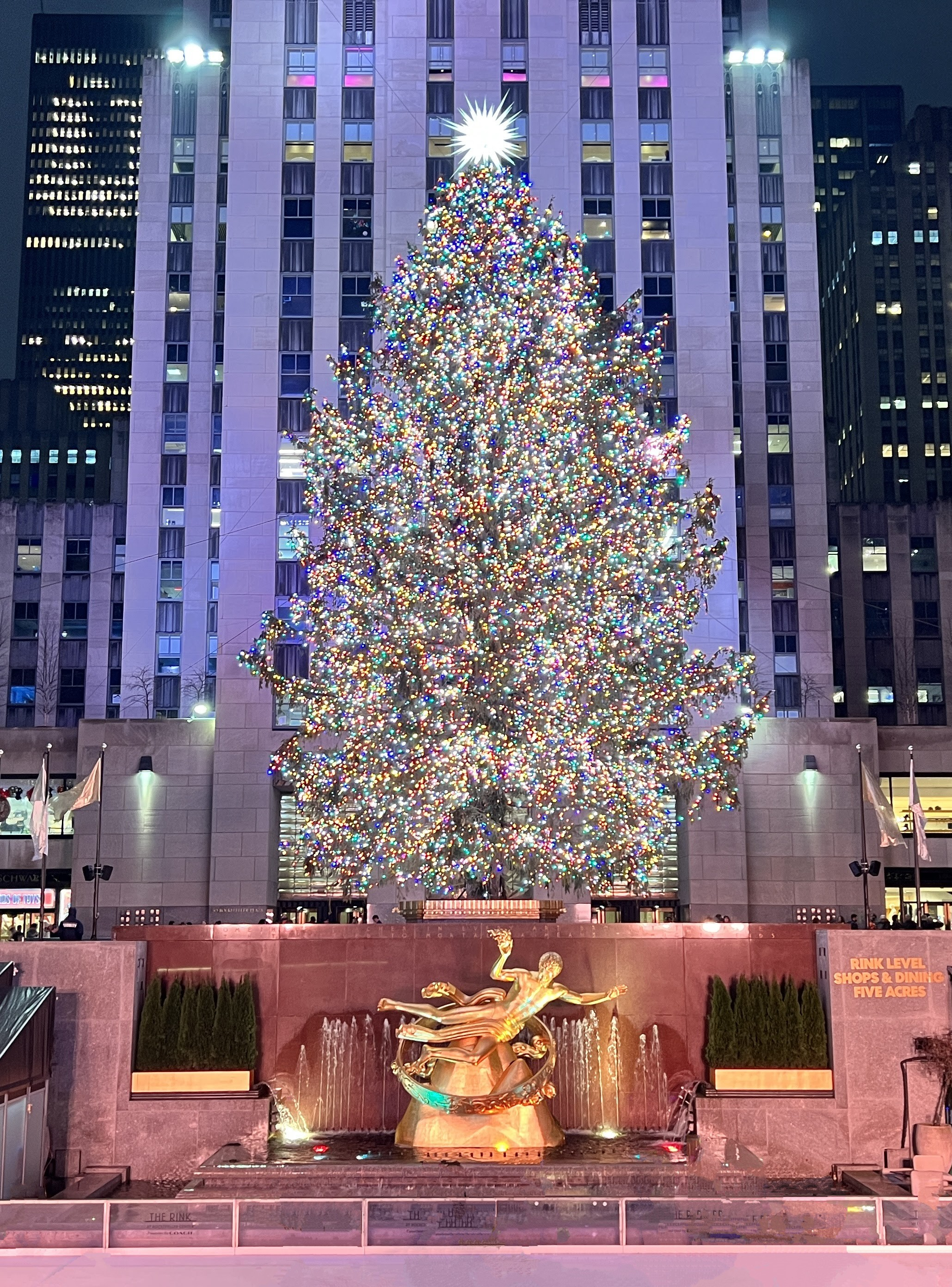
The 2022 Rockefeller Center Christmas Tree, an 82 ft Norway Spruce decorated with 50,000 LED lights sourced from Bill’s Woods and a Swarovski crystal star

The Rockefeller Center Christmas Tree is a large Christmas tree placed annually at Rockefeller Center, in Midtown Manhattan, New York City, United States. The tree is put in place in mid November and lit in a public ceremony on the last Wednesday of November or first Wednesday of December and following Thanksgiving. Since 1997, the lighting has been broadcast live, to hundreds of millions, on NBC's Christmas in Rockefeller Center telecast. The tree lighting ceremony is aired at the end of every broadcast, following live entertainment and the tree is lit by the current mayor of New York City, the CEO and president of Tishman Speyer and special guests.

The tree, usually a Norway spruce 69 to 100 feet (21–30 m) tall, has been a national tradition each year since 1933. The official 2025 Christmas Tree Lighting occurred during a live broadcast on December 3, 2025. The tree will remain on display until 10 January 2026.

== Selection and decoration ==
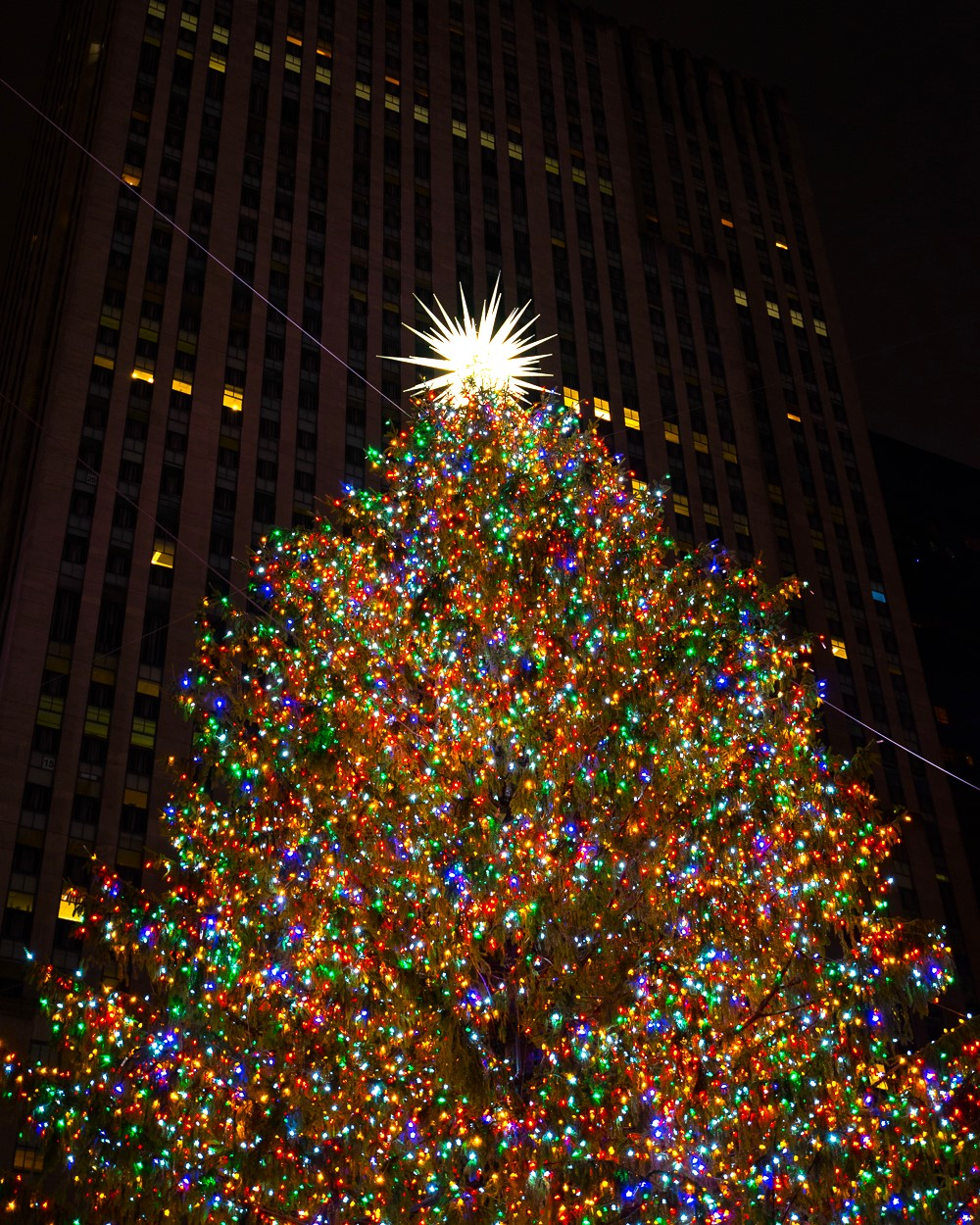
A close-up look at the Rockefeller Christmas Tree in 2018

Trees are traditionally donated to Rockefeller Center, which in turn donates the lumber after display. Until his death in 2009, the late David Murbach, Manager of the Gardens Division of Rockefeller Center, scouted for the desired tree in upstate New York and surrounding states, and even Ottawa in Ontario, Canada.

Erik Pauzé, Head Gardener at Rockefeller Center, looks for each year's Rockefeller Center Christmas tree. He visits nurseries throughout the tri-state area and looks for unique backyard trees. Trees are also submitted for consideration through Rockefeller Center's website. Pauzé and his team choose each year's tree based on its heartiness and "Christmas tree shape," as well as its ability to support the heavy ornaments.

Once a tree is selected, a crane supports the tree while it is cut, then moved to a custom telescoping trailer able to transport trees up to 125 feet (38 m) tall, although the narrowness of the streets around Rockefeller Center limits the height of the tree to 100 feet (30 m). The tree is then delivered to the city by a local company, Christmas Tree Brooklyn. On its way to Manhattan, the tree is often dressed in giant red bows or banners extending holiday greetings to witnesses. Trucks, barges, and a transport plane have all been used to help the tree make the trip.

Once at Rockefeller Center, the tree is supported by four guy-wires attached at its midpoint and by a steel spike at its base. Scaffolding is erected around the tree to assist workers in hanging about 50,000 multi-colored LED lights and the star top. A new crystal star of Swarovski crystal which tops the tree was created in 2018 and designed by the renowned architect Daniel Liebeskind. The new star features 70 spikes and three million crystals with LED lighting spots by the company Oznium, who worked with the engineers. In total it weighs 900 pounds (408.23 kg).

The decorated tree remains on display at the plaza entrance of 30 Rockefeller Plaza at least through January 6 of the new year. As of 2019, more than a half million people passed by the tree each day while it is on display, according to Rockefeller Center.

== History behind the tree ==
The first tree at Rockefeller Center, erected by construction workers in 1931 shortly after the site was cleared. Above, the workers line up for pay beside the tree, adorned with garlands made by workers' families.

The first Christmas tree at Rockefeller Center was erected in 1931, during the Depression-era construction of Rockefeller Center, when Italian, Greek, and Irish American workers decorated a smaller 20 foot (6.1 m) balsam fir with "strings of cranberries, garlands of paper, and even a few tin cans" on Christmas Eve. With the lighting of the 50-foot-tall (15 m) first official tree in 1933, the tree became what Rockefeller Center dubbed "a holiday beacon for New Yorkers and visitors alike". A skating rink was opened below the tree in the plaza in 1936.

Since then, the Rockefeller Center Christmas Tree has been a yearly tradition. Workers pooled their money for that unlit tree, with the garlands made by workers' families. According to Rockefeller Center's website, the tree was "from the beginning ... a gathering place and reflection of what was happening in the world around it".

World War II ushered in simple, patriotic decorations, including red, white and blue unlit globes and painted wooden stars. In 1942, three more modest trees were raised instead of one large tree, each decorated in one of the flag's colors. The tree went unlit from 1944 until the war's end in 1945 due to blackout regulations. After the war, the year of darkness was left behind, as six ultraviolet light projectors were employed to make it appear as though the tree's 700 fluorescent globes were glowing in the dark. By the 1950s, workers began using scaffolding to decorate the tree, as larger trees were accommodated. Before the decade was over, the decorating process called for 20 workers and nine days.

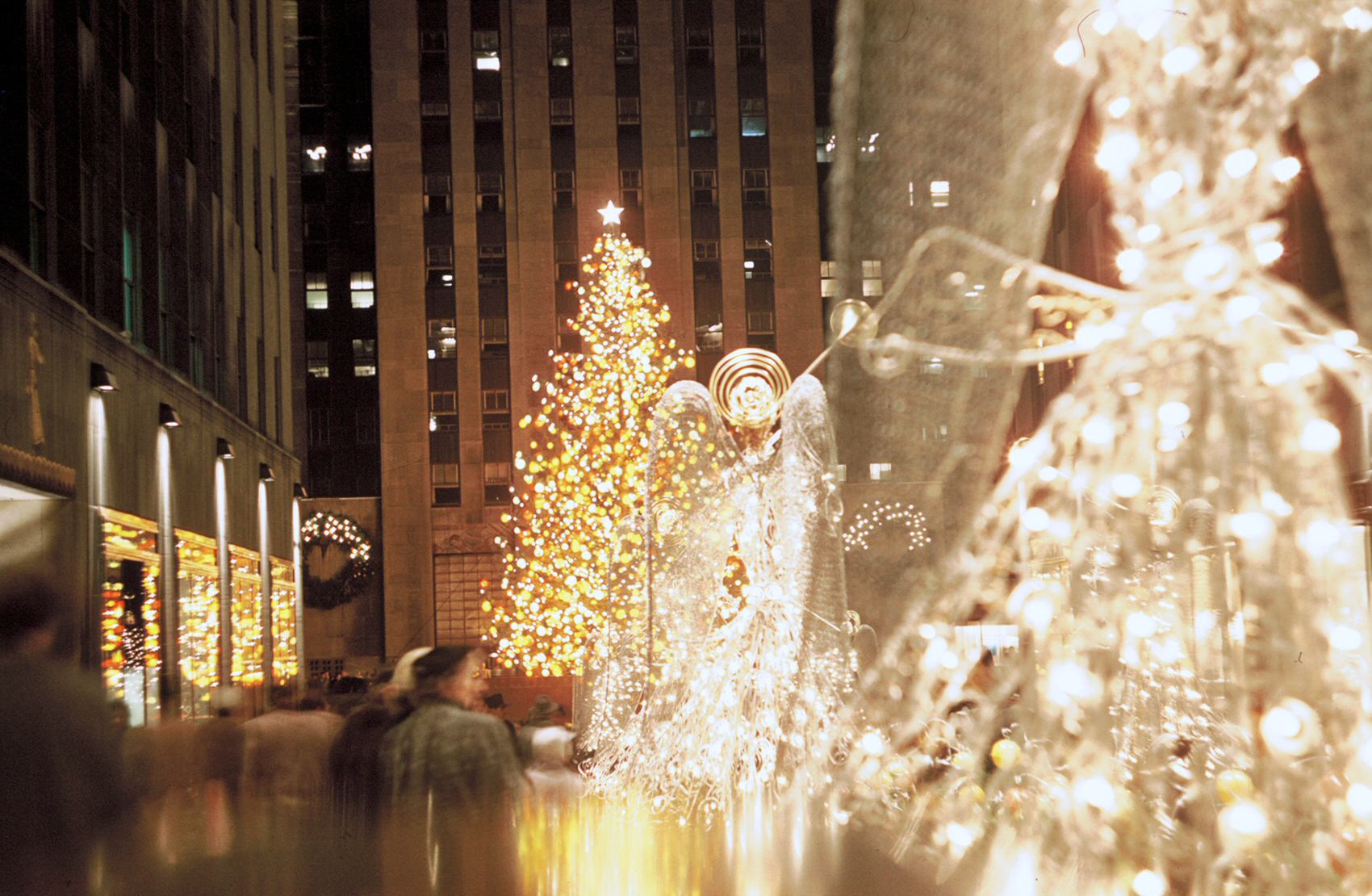
The first towering wire herald angels pictured in 1955

In 1955, artist Valerie Clarebout's towering wire herald angels were added to the Channel Gardens in front of the tree near Fifth Avenue. Clarebout created the 12 sculptures using 75 points of metal wire each.

Though the tree typically makes its journey on a truck bed, in 1998 it was flown in from Richfield, Ohio, on the world's second-largest transport plane at the time, an Antonov An-124 Ruslan. 1999 saw Rockefeller Center's tallest tree, a 100 foot (30 m) spruce from Killingworth, Connecticut.

In 2001, following the September 11 attacks, the tree was again decorated in hues of red, white and blue.

Until 2008, the tree is lit following a 10-second countdown. Since 2009, the tree is lit following a 5-second countdown and since 2011, the tree lighting ceremony has been followed by the singing of Joy to the World performed by a choir. In 2018, Kellie Pickler sang this song following the lighting ceremony. Until 2018, the lighting was the last moment of the program, and has since been moved to the last ten minutes.

In 2014, mayor Bill de Blasio did not attend the tree lighting ceremony due to the protests that had started after a grand jury's decision in the Eric Garner case. In 2025, mayor Eric Adams did not attend the ceremony for an undisclosed reason.

=== Environmental impact ===
The 1971 65-foot-tall (20 m) tree from East Montpelier, Vermont, was the first to be mulched and recycled. It was turned into 30 three-bushel bags of mulch for the nature trails of upper Manhattan.

In 2007, the tree went "green", converting to energy-efficient lighting with LEDs. The LEDs use 1,200 fewer kilowatt hours of electricity per day, enough to power a 2,000-square-foot home for a month. Also since 2007, each year after display, the tree has been milled into lumber and donated to Habitat for Humanity for use in house construction.

On November 16, 2020, an adult female Northern saw-whet owl was found dehydrated and hungry within the wrapped branches of the newly delivered tree during its installation. The bird was discovered by workers who transported the spruce 170 miles (270 km) from Oneonta, New York to New York City. The feathered stowaway, named Rockefeller (Rocky), endured the three-day road trip and generated much public interest and media coverage. She was taken to a wildlife center for a check-up and nursed to full strength before being released on the grounds of the wildlife center in Saugerties, New York.

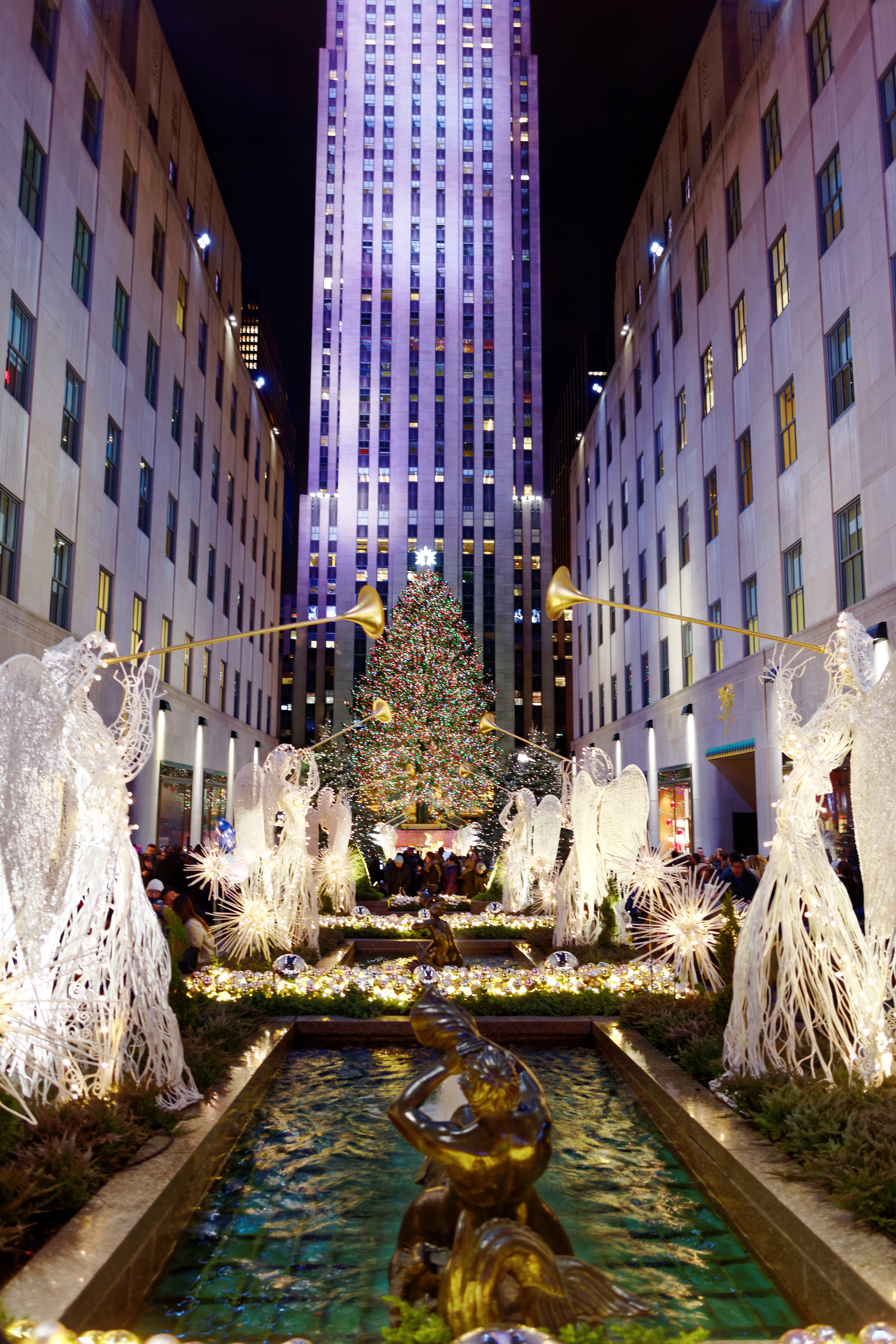
The 2016 Rockefeller Center Christmas Tree, a 94-foot (29 m) high Norway Spruce

=== In popular culture ===
The tree plays a key role in the film Home Alone 2: Lost in New York, as the location where the protagonist Kevin's mother reunites with him, on account of his love of Christmas trees.

== Broadcasting ==
1951 marked the first time that NBC televised the tree lighting with a special on The Kate Smith Hour.

Since 1997, the lighting ceremony has been broadcast live on NBC in the first hour of primetime, live in the Eastern and Central time zones, and on tape elsewhere. On NBC-owned stations, a 7pm ET/PT hour is also aired and hosted by WNBC's main anchors. The ceremony is hosted by Today's Al Roker (1997–present), Savannah Guthrie (2012–present), and Hoda Kotb (2017–present). In 2007, Ashley Tisdale and Nick Lachey hosted the broadcast with Roker. In 2018, MSNBC and Today anchor Craig Melvin began co-hosting the broadcast. In 2022, Mario Lopez filled in for Guthrie and Roker due to her illness and his health complications involving blood clots. Kelly Clarkson hosted in 2023 and 2024. Reba McEntire hosted in 2025. Cynthia Erivo hosted in 2026. Until 1997, it had been broadcast before primetime exclusively in New York on WNBC. In 2019, a second hour was added, meaning the tree is now lit just before 10 p.m. ET.

=== Performers ===
In recent years, celebrity appearances and live performances preceded the tree lighting ceremony and featured some of the biggest names in music. Performers for the broadcast ceremonies have included, over the years, John Legend, Diana Ross, Gwen Stefani, Garth Brooks and Trisha Yearwood, Martina McBride, Kelly Clarkson, Pentatonix, Dolly Parton, Carrie Underwood, Brad Paisley, Harry Connick Jr., Rosemary Clooney, Annie Lennox, Norah Jones, Aretha Franklin, Cyndi Lauper, Mariah Carey, Josh Groban, Mickey Guyton, Lady Gaga and Tony Bennett. The ceremony traditionally includes a performance by The Rockettes.

== Yearly tree details ==
Year	Original location	Tree type	Height	Lighting ceremony	Notes
1931		Balsam fir	20 ft (6.1 m)		First tree decorated with handmade garland and strings of cranberries.
1933		Balsam fir	50 ft (15 m)		
1934	Babylon, New York	Norway spruce	70 ft (21 m)	December 11, 1934	
1935	Babylon, New York	Norway spruce	80 ft (24 m)		
1936	Morristown, New Jersey	Norway spruce	70 ft (21 m)		Twin trees with newly opened skating rink
1937	Allamuchy, New Jersey	Norway spruce	70 ft (21 m)		Twin trees from Peter Stuyvesant estate
1938		Norway spruce	70 ft (21 m)	December 19, 1938	
1939	Wyckoff, New Jersey	Norway spruce	75 ft (23 m)	December 18, 1939	decorated only with floodlights and one star
1940	Hyde Park, New York	Norway spruce	88 ft (27 m)		from William Eastwood estate
1941		Norway spruce	80 ft (24 m)		Four reindeer featured with the display
1942	Huntington, New York,	Norway spruce	50 ft (15 m)		Three trees not lighted, painted red, white & blue
1944	Long Island, New York	Norway spruce	65 ft (20 m)		Unlit since 1941. Known as "The Dark Trees"
1945	Syosset, New York	Norway spruce	55 ft (17 m)	December 14, 1945	
1946	Syosset, New York	Norway spruce	75 ft (23 m)		
1947	Deer Park, New York	Norway spruce	65 ft (20 m)		
1948	Mount Kisco, New York	Norway spruce	90 ft (27 m)	December 10, 1948	
1949	Yaphank, New York	Norway spruce	75 ft (23 m)	December 9, 1949	Spray-painted white
1950	Mount Kisco, New York	Norway spruce	85 ft (26 m)		
1951	Lake Ronkonkoma, New York	Norway spruce	82 ft (25 m)		
1952	Allamuchy, New Jersey	Norway spruce	85 ft (26 m)		from Peter Stuyvesant Estate
1953	Morristown, New Jersey	Norway spruce	75 ft (23 m)		
1954	Belvidere, New Jersey	Norway spruce	65 ft (20 m)		
1955	Belvidere, New Jersey	Norway spruce	65 ft (20 m)		
1956	Dalton, New Hampshire	White spruce	64 ft (20 m)	December 6, 1956	
1957	Island Pond, Vermont	White spruce	67 ft (20 m)		
1958	East Madison, Maine	White spruce	64 ft (20 m)	December 11, 1958	
1959	Podunk, Massachusetts	Norway spruce	70 ft (21 m)	December 10, 1959	
1960	North Harford, Pennsylvania	Norway spruce	80 ft (24 m)		
1961	Smithtown, New York	Norway spruce	85 ft (26 m)	December 7, 1961	
1962	Greenville, Maine	White spruce	67 ft (20 m)	December 6, 1962	
1963	Hurley, New York	Norway spruce	60 ft (18 m)	December 12, 1963	
1964	Lake Carmel, New York	Norway spruce	60 ft (18 m)	December 10, 1964	
1965	Darien, Connecticut	Norway spruce	60 ft (18 m)	December 9, 1965	
1966	Ottawa, Ontario, Canada	White spruce	64 ft (20 m)		
1967	Coventry, Vermont	Balsam fir	65 ft (20 m)		
1968	Holland, Vermont	White spruce	60 ft (18 m)		
1969	Saranac Lake, New York	Balsam fir	70 ft (21 m)	December 11, 1969	
1970	Coventry, Vermont	White spruce	60 ft (18 m)		
1971	East Montpelier, Vermont	Balsam fir	65 ft (20 m)		
1972	Old Bridge, New Jersey	Norway spruce	65 ft (20 m)		
1973	Tenafly, New Jersey	Norway spruce	65 ft (20 m)		
1974	Lehighton, Pennsylvania	Norway spruce	63 ft (19 m)		
1975	New Canaan, Connecticut	Balsam fir	59 ft (18 m)		
1976	Montclair, New Jersey	White spruce	65 ft (20 m)		
1977	Dixfield, Maine	White spruce	65 ft (20 m)		
1978	Mahwah, New Jersey	Norway spruce	75 ft (23 m)		
1979	Spring Valley, New York	Norway spruce	65 ft (20 m)		
1980	Mahwah, New Jersey	Norway spruce	70 ft (21 m)	December 8, 1980	
1981	West Danville, Vermont	White spruce	65 ft (20 m)	December 7, 1981	
1982	Mahwah, New Jersey	Norway spruce	70 ft (21 m)	December 6, 1982	
1983	Valley Cottage, New York	Norway spruce	75 ft (23 m)	December 5, 1983	
1984	Far Hills, New Jersey	Norway spruce	75 ft (23 m)	December 3, 1984	
1985	Harveyville, Pennsylvania	Norway spruce	75 ft (23 m)	December 9, 1985	
1986	Nanuet, New York	Norway spruce	68 ft (21 m)	December 1, 1986	
1987	Suffern, New York	Norway spruce	75 ft (23 m)	December 1, 1987	
1988	Raritan Township, New Jersey	Norway spruce	75 ft (23 m)		
1989	Montebello, New York	Norway spruce	70 ft (21 m)	December 4, 1989	
1990	West Norwalk, Connecticut	Norway spruce	75 ft (23 m)	December 3, 1990	
1991	Suffern, New York	Norway spruce	65 ft (20 m)	December 3, 1991	
1992	Stony Point, New York	Norway spruce	65 ft (20 m)	December 2, 1992	
1993	Nanuet, New York	Norway spruce	85 ft (26 m)	December 2, 1993	
1994	Ridgefield, Connecticut	Norway spruce	85 ft (26 m)	December 2, 1994	
1995	Mendham Borough, New Jersey	Norway spruce	75 ft (23 m)	December 5, 1995	
1996	Armonk, New York	Norway spruce	90 ft (27 m)	December 3, 1996	
1997	Stony Point, New York	Norway spruce	70 ft (21 m)	December 2, 1997	
1998	Richfield, Ohio	Norway spruce	75 ft (23 m)	December 2, 1998	
1999	Killingworth, Connecticut	Norway spruce	100 ft (30 m)	December 1, 1999	
2000	Buchanan, New York	Norway spruce	80 ft (24 m)	November 29, 2000	
2001	Wayne, New Jersey	Norway spruce	81 ft (25 m)	November 28, 2001	
2002	Bloomsbury, New Jersey	Norway spruce	76 ft (23 m)	December 4, 2002	
2003	Manchester, Connecticut	Norway spruce	79 ft (24 m)	December 3, 2003	
2004	Suffern, New York	Norway spruce	71 ft (22 m)	November 30, 2004	
2005	Wayne, New Jersey	Norway spruce	74 ft (23 m)	November 30, 2005	
2006	Ridgefield, Connecticut	Norway spruce	88 ft (27 m)	November 29, 2006	
2007	Shelton, Connecticut	Norway spruce	84 ft (26 m)	November 28, 2007	
2008	Hamilton Township, New Jersey	Norway spruce	72 ft (22 m)	December 3, 2008	
2009	Easton, Connecticut	Norway spruce	76 ft (23 m)	December 2, 2009	
2010	Mahopac, New York	Norway spruce	74 ft (23 m)	November 30, 2010	
2011	Mifflinville, Pennsylvania	Norway spruce	74 ft (23 m)	November 30, 2011	
2012	Flanders, New Jersey	Norway spruce	80 ft (24 m)	November 28, 2012	
2013	Shelton, Connecticut	Norway spruce	76 ft (23 m)	December 4, 2013	
2014	Danville, Pennsylvania	Norway spruce	85 ft (26 m)	December 3, 2014	
2015	Gardiner, New York	Norway spruce	78 ft (24 m)	December 2, 2015	
2016	Oneonta, New York	Norway spruce	94 ft (29 m)	November 30, 2016	
2017	State College, Pennsylvania	Norway spruce	75 ft (23 m)	November 29, 2017	
2018	Wallkill, New York	Norway spruce	72 ft (22 m)	November 28, 2018	
2019	Florida, New York	Norway spruce	77 ft (23 m)	December 4, 2019	
2020	Oneonta, New York	Norway spruce	75 ft (23 m)	December 2, 2020	
2021	Elkton, Maryland	Norway spruce	79 ft (24 m)	December 1, 2021	
2022	Queensbury, New York	Norway spruce	82 ft (25 m)	November 30, 2022	50,000 LED lights & Swarovski crystal star; remained on display until January 14, 2023
2023	Vestal, New York	Norway spruce	80 ft (24 m)	November 29, 2023	More than 50,000 multi-colored, LED lights; crowned with a Swarovski star
2024	West Stockbridge, Massachusetts	Norway spruce	74 ft (23 m)	December 4, 2024	
2025	East Greenbush, New York	Norway spruce	75 ft (23 m)	December 3, 2025	Donated by homeowner
2026	West Edmeston, New York	Norway spruce	76 ft (23 m)	December 2, 2026	

== See also ==
- National Christmas Tree
- Capitol Christmas Tree
- White House Christmas tree
- Vatican Christmas Tree
- Rich's Great Tree
- Grove Christmas Tree
- Boston Christmas Tree
- List of individual trees

== Bibliography ==
- d'Agostino, Carla Torsilieri; Byrd, Byron Keith (1997). The Christmas Tree at Rockefeller Center. ISBN 0-9650308-7-3.
- "Christmas Tech". Modern Marvels. December 20, 2006. The History Channel. Archived from the original on May 16, 2007.
