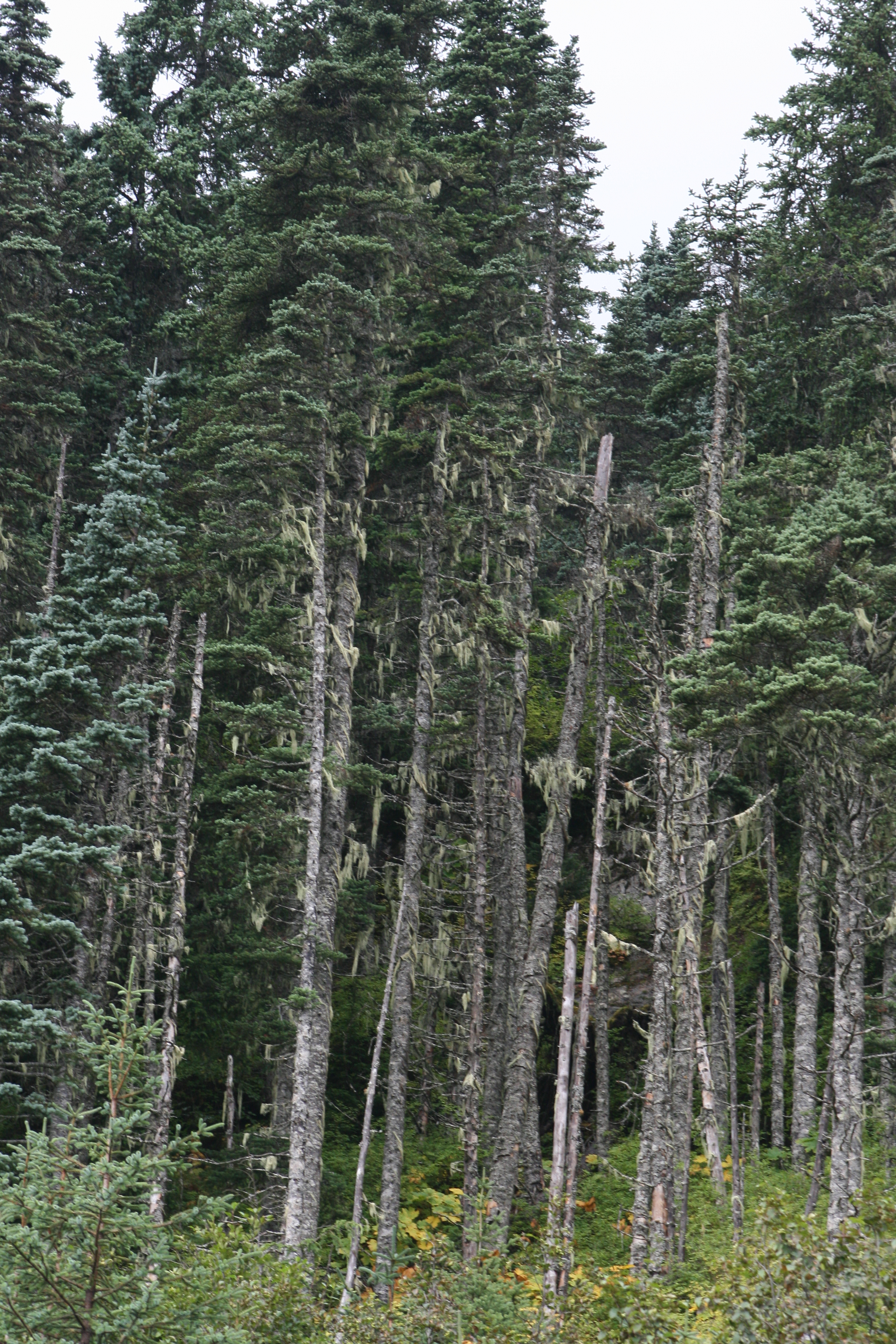
- Picea × lutzii forest, near Skagway, Alaska

Scientific classification
- Kingdom: Plantae
- Clade: Tracheophytes
- Clade: Gymnosperms
- Division: Pinophyta
- Class: Pinopsida
- Order: Pinales
- Family: Pinaceae
- Genus: Picea
- Species: P. × lutzii

Binomial name
- Picea × lutzii Little

= Picea × lutzii =

Lutz spruce

Species of conifer

Picea × lutzii is a hybrid spruce tree that is a natural cross between white spruce and Sitka spruce occurring where the ranges of the two species overlap in coastal south-central Alaska and coastal British Columbia. Its common name is Lutz spruce. Its morphology is intermediate between the two parent species, the maritime Sitka spruce and the white spruce of dryer climates further inland. In addition to the parent spruces it shares its ecosystem with Tsuga heterophylla and T. mertensiana. The tree was named for Harold John Lutz, a scientist who specialized in forest soils and worked briefly for the United States Forest Service in Alaska where he collected the material used to describe the hybrid. A Lutz spruce from Alaska's Chugach National Forest was selected in 2015 for the Capitol Christmas Tree. This is the first Capitol Tree that has come from the state of Alaska.

Lutz's spruce grows as tall as 30 meters in height, and it is a generally symmetrical tree with open and downward bowing branches. While its needles are sharp like the Sitka spruce, they are not as "stiff" and, therefore, less "prickly." The seed cones closely resemble those of the Sitka spruce but are smaller and with the rounded tops of white spruce cones.

Between 1987 and 2000 the largest known epidemic of spruce bark beetle (Dendroctonus rufipennis) caused the death of 90% of white, Sitka, and hybrid Lutz spruce, almost all of the mature spruce trees, in a 3.2 million acre forest in the Kenai Peninsula and Copper River. The spruce bark beetle is a part of the native ecosystem, mainly hosted by the white spruce of the dryer interior, in south-central Alaska where the tree loss occurred in apparently healthy old growth forest. One theory about the decimation of trees is that warmer spring and summer temperatures have allowed the beetles an annual reproductive cycle, shortened from every two to three years, while warmer winter temperatures have increased the number of beetles that live through winter to reproduce in spring. In addition to increased temperatures, increased aridity in the region has created dryer forests lowering the production of sap, a barrier defense against insect and fungal pests, in the spruces. Lutz spruces, like its primary host, the white spruce, are more susceptible than Sitka spruce and black spruce to bark beetle damage and suffer a higher mortality rate when infected.
