= California Capitol Christmas Tree =

Christmas tree in Sacramento, California

Coordinates: 38.5769°N 121.4945°W

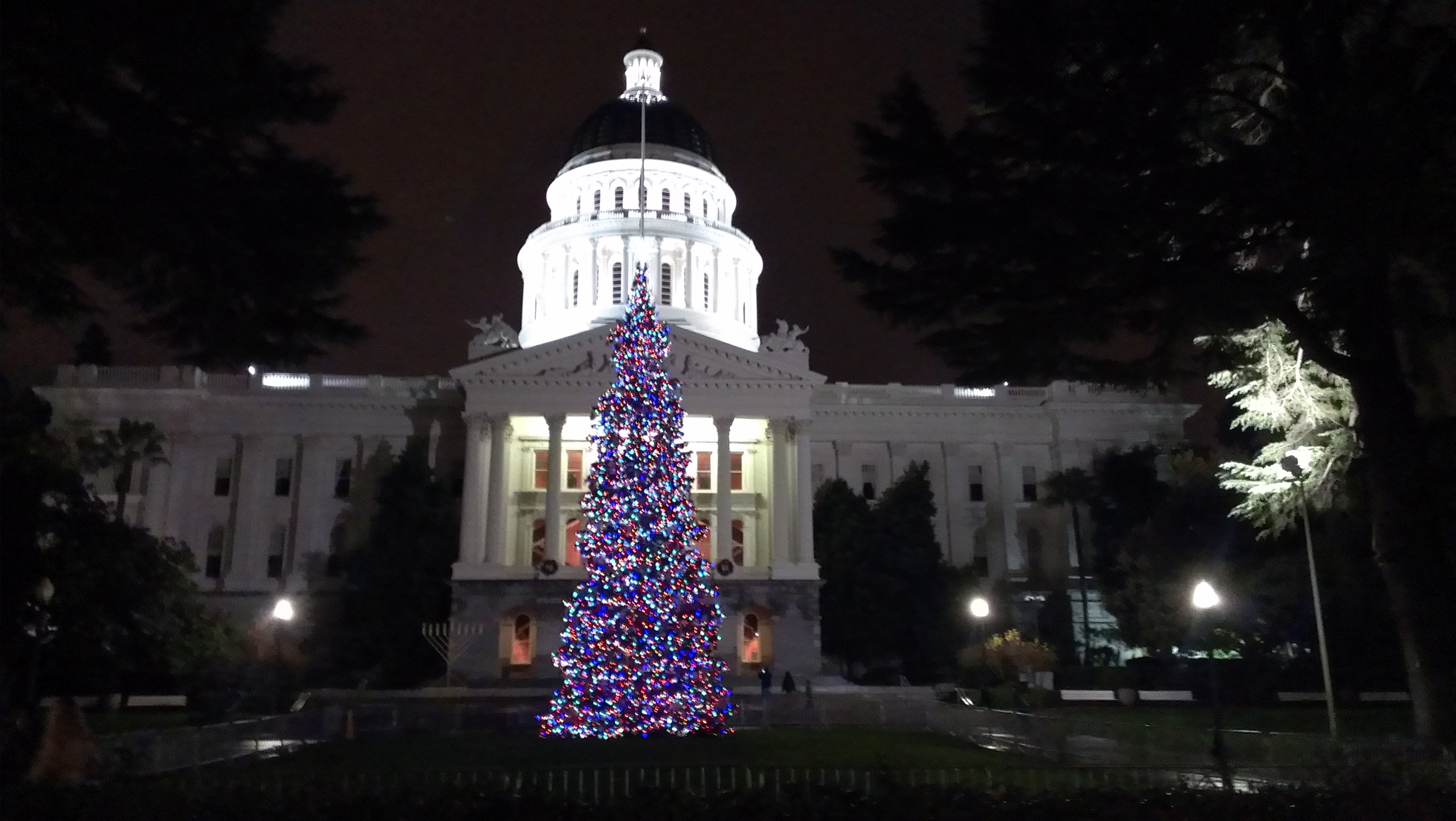
The illuminated tree in front of the California Capitol during the 2012 holiday season in Sacramento, California

The California Capitol Christmas Tree (known as the California Capitol Holiday Tree between 1999 and 2003) is an annually erected decorated tree outside the California State Capitol in Sacramento, California, United States. Initiated in 1931, the tree has been a tradition ever since and is decorated during the second week of December each year.

In December 1999, during his first Christmas season in office, Governor Gray Davis changed the name of the tree to the California Capitol Holiday Tree, a spokesperson describing this as a name that "more accurately symbolizes the diversity of what the holidays are in California". After the 2003 California recall, Gray Davis was replaced with Arnold Schwarzenegger, who changed the name back from the Christmas of 2004. A similar occurrence took place with the Capitol Christmas Tree in Washington, DC, which took on the "holiday" generic name from 1999–2005.
