= Capitol Christmas Tree =

Public Christmas tree in Washington, D.C., U.S.

Coordinates: 38.8898°N 77.0112°W

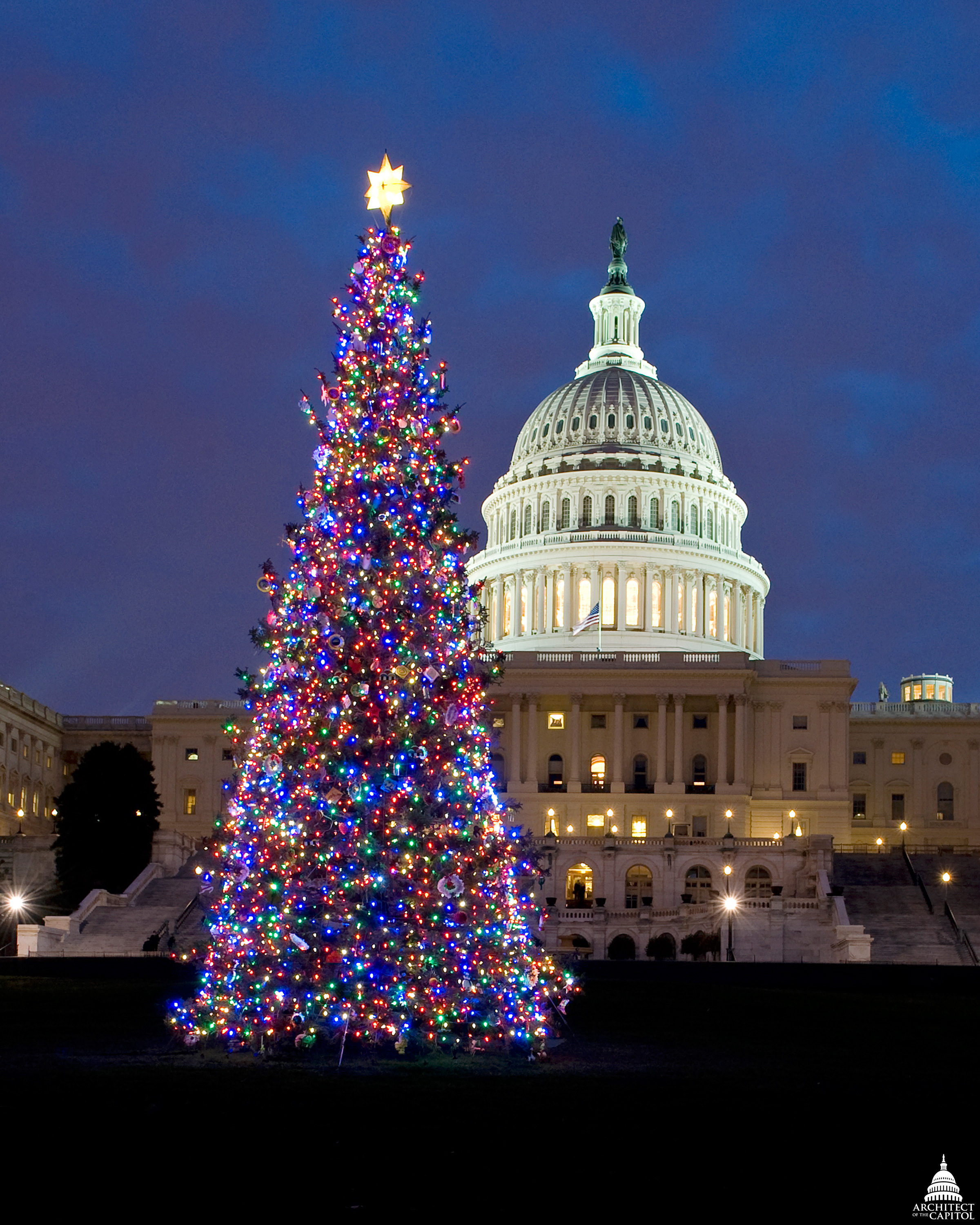
Capitol Christmas Tree, 2009

The Capitol Christmas Tree, formerly the Capitol Holiday Tree and nicknamed the People’s Tree, is the decorated tree that is erected annually on the West Front Lawn of the United States Capitol, in Washington, D.C., to celebrate the Christmas holiday season. The selection, installation, and decoration of the tree are all overseen by the Superintendent of the Capitol Grounds of the Architect of the Capitol (AOC).

The tree is traditionally lit by the Speaker of the United States House of Representatives, accompanied by an essay contest winner during a ceremony at the beginning of December or even at the end of November, and remains lit each night through New Year's Day. By tradition, the President and Vice President of the United States or celebrity guests will not attend the tree lighting ceremony.

== History ==
Records of the AOC indicate that a Christmas Tree was purchased in 1919; however, it was not until 1964, one year after the suggestion of John W. McCormack, the 53rd Speaker of the House, that a procedure was established for the installation of a yearly tree.

The 1963 tree was a live Douglas-fir, purchased from a Pennsylvania nursery. It was re-decorated each year through 1967 when it was severely damaged in a wind storm and subsequently died as a result of root damage. After the 1963 tree died, white pines from Maryland were cut down and put on display for the 1968 and 1969 seasons. Beginning in 1970, trees have been provided by the U.S. Forest Service from various National Forests.

In the late 1990s, the Capitol Christmas Tree was renamed to the Capitol Holiday Tree. There was never a clear explanation as to why the name change occurred, but the name change raised controversy. On November 29, 2005, the day after the 2005 tree arrived from New Mexico, the tree was renamed the Capitol Christmas Tree at the request of Dennis Hastert, the 59th Speaker of the House.

Traditionally, the tree is lit following a 5-second countdown and the tree lighting ceremony has been followed by the playing of "O Tannenbaum".

== Trees ==
Year	Species	Height	Location grown	State	Notes
2026	Engelmann Spruce	76 feet (23 m)	Nez Perce National Forest and Clearwater National Forest	Idaho	
2025	Red Fir	53 feet (16 m)	Humboldt-Toiyabe National Forest	Nevada	This is the first time that the People's Tree comes from the State of Nevada.
2024	Sitka Spruce	80 feet (24 m)	Tongass National Forest	Alaska	
2023	Norway Spruce	63 feet (19 m)	Monongahela National Forest	West Virginia	
2022	Red Spruce	78 feet (24 m)	Pisgah National Forest	North Carolina	The tree was lit for the final time by the Speaker of the House, Nancy Pelosi, accompanied by Coche Tiger, on November 29, during a ceremony on the West Front Lawn beginning at 5 p.m. It was harvested on November 2 and arrived at the U.S. Capitol on November 18, at 10 a.m. The AOC's Capitol Grounds and Arboretum team were secure the tree and decorate it with thousands of handcrafted ornaments from the people of North Carolina. The tree remained lit from nightfall until 11 p.m. each evening through January 1, 2023.
2021	White fir	84 feet (26 m)	Six Rivers National Forest	California	The tree was lit on December 1. It was harvested on October 23 and arrived at the West Front Lawn on November 19, the tree was installed and decorated by the Architect of the Capitol's grounds team. For the second year in a row, the tree remained lit from nightfall until 11 p.m. every night through Christmas.
2020	Engelmann Spruce	55 feet (17 m)	Grand Mesa, Uncompahgre and Gunnison National Forests	Colorado	The tree was lit at a public ceremony on December 2. It was harvested on November 5 and arrived at the U.S. Capitol on November 20 after traveling cross-country by truck. Decorates it with thousands of handcrafted ornaments from the people of Colorado. Due to the ongoing COVID-19 pandemic, the tree remained lit from nightfall to 11 pm each night through Christmas, instead of January 1, 2021.
2019	Blue spruce	60 feet (18 m)	Carson National Forest	New Mexico	
2018	Noble Fir	82 feet (25 m)	Willamette National Forest	Oregon	
2017	Engelmann Spruce	79 feet (24 m)	Kootenai National Forest	Montana	
2016	Engelmann Spruce	84 feet (26 m)	Payette National Forest	Idaho	The tree was lit at a public ceremony on Dec. 6. Thousands of LED lights and 6,000 ornaments made by children in Idaho were hung on the tree. The ornaments represent things relevant to Idaho, including salmon and pine cones.
2015	Lutz Spruce	74 feet (23 m)	Chugach National Forest	Alaska	The first Capitol Christmas Tree from Alaska.
2014	White Spruce	88 feet (27 m)	Chippewa National Forest	Minnesota	
2013	Engelmann Spruce	88 feet (27 m)	Colville National Forest	Washington	
2012	Engelmann Spruce	73 feet (22 m)	White River National Forest	Colorado	The 2012 theme 'Celebrating Our Great Outdoors' will be highlighted in the decoration of the tree. It is expected to be lit by Speaker John Boehner during a ceremony in early December.
2011	Sierra white fir	63 feet (19 m)	Stanislaus National Forest	California	Lit by John Boehner on December 6. Decorated with approximately 3,000 ornaments, showcasing the tree's theme "California Shines," made by people from across California. The entire tree was decorated using strands of LEDs.
2010	Engelmann Spruce	67 feet (20 m)	Bridger-Teton National Forest	Wyoming	Lit by Nancy Pelosi on December 7. Decorated with approximately 5,000 ornaments, showcasing the tree's theme "Wyoming: Forever West," made by people from across Wyoming. The entire tree was decorated using strands of LEDs.
2009	Blue spruce	85 feet (26 m)	Apache-Sitgreaves National Forests	Arizona	Joined by Kaitlyn Ferencik, from Canyon Ridge Elementary School in Surprise, Arizona, Nancy Pelosi lit the tree in a ceremony on December 8. The tree was felled in early November, and delivered to Washington on November 30. The tree was decorated with 10,000 LEDs, and 5,000 ornaments crafted and donated by the people of Arizona. A significant portion of the ornaments were created by Arizona school children who were provided with specifications for their ornaments, including the instructions that “[o]rnaments cannot reflect a religious or political theme… Instead share your interpretation of our theme 'Arizona's Gift, from the Grand Canyon State.'” The ADF sent a letter to various officials associated with the 2009 tree, on the behalf of Candace Duncan, whose child wished to submit ornaments including the following phrases: "Happy Birthday, Jesus," and "Merry Christmas." The ADF made the argument that the child's First Amendment rights were violated by the restrictions. The instructions for the event were modified by October 1, and no longer included the religious restrictions. A spokesperson for the AOC was quoted as saying the previous instruction contained “old information,” and that “is no longer the position of the agency.”
2008	Subalpine Fir	70 feet (21 m)	Bitterroot National Forest	Montana	The tree was decorated with more than 5,000 ornaments displaying the theme "Sharing Montana's Treasures" by showcasing the state's heritage, historical events, and natural resources. The ornaments were crafted and donated by the people of Montana. As a part of the lighting ceremony, Jack Gladstone performed "Heart of Montana," the official song of the 2008 Christmas tree lighting ceremony. Strands of LEDs were used to light the entire tree.
2007	Balsam Fir	55 feet (17 m)	Green Mountain National Forest	Vermont	A 55-foot fir, the tree was decorated exclusively with LEDs and some 4,500 ornaments crafted and donated by the people of Vermont reflecting the theme Bringing an Old Fashioned Holiday to the Nation.”
2006	Pacific Silver Fir	65 feet (20 m)	Olympic National Forest	Washington	The tree was lit by Dennis Hastert, assisted by eight-year-old Micah Joe from Bremerton, at 5 pm on December 6. Felled in early November, the tree arrived at the West Front Lawn of the Capitol on November 27. 3,000 ornaments were provided by Washington school children depicting the state's history, heritage, and landscapes and strands of 10,000 LEDs. The lighting ceremony also features carols sung by the National Presbyterian School Chorus and music performed by the United States Navy Band.
2005	Engelmann Spruce	65 feet (20 m)	Santa Fe National Forest	New Mexico	The tree was lit by Dennis Hastert, assisted by eight-year-old Steven Castillo from Santa Fe, at 5 pm on December 8 in a ceremony including music performed by the United States Marine Band. Felled in early November, the tree arrived by trailer at the West Front Lawn of the Capitol on November 28. Decorated with some 3,000 ornaments crafted and donated by the people of New Mexico, the tree was lit with 10,000 lights (including strands of LEDs for the first time), and remained lit from dusk until 11 pm each night through January 1, 2006. First tree since 1998 with the "Christmas Tree" title.
2004	Red Spruce	65 feet (20 m)	George Washington and Jefferson National Forests	Virginia	The tree was lit by Dennis Hastert, assisted by seven-year-old Blayne Braden of Monterey, VA, at 5 pm on December 9 during a ceremony held on the West Front Lawn of the Capitol. Virginia Senators John Warner and George Allen both offered holiday greetings to the crowd, the United States Air Force Band, and the Mountain Mission School Concert Choir also performed during the ceremony. The tree was decorated with some 5,000 ornaments crafted and donated by the people of Virginia along with 10,000 lights.
2003	Engelmann Spruce	70 feet (21 m)	Boise National Forest	Idaho	The tree was lit by Dennis Hastert on December 11 in a ceremony on the West Front Lawn including performances by the United States Army Band, the Snake River High School Chamber Choir from Blackfoot, Idaho, and the Congressional Chorus. Decorations for the tree included some 6,000 ornaments crafted and donated by the people of Idaho along with 10,000 lights. The tree remained lit from dusk to 11 pm each night through January 1, 2004.
2002	Douglas Fir	70 feet (21 m)	Umpqua National Forest	Oregon	The tree was lit by Dennis Hastert on December 12 in a ceremony including performances by the United States Navy Band, the Umpqua Singers from Umpqua Community College, and the Congressional Chorus. Decorated with 6,000 ornaments crafted and donated by the people of Oregon, the three was lit with 10,000 lights. Delivery of the tree from Umpqua National Forest took 22 days, with the tree arriving at the Capitol on December 2. During the ceremony, Hastert was presented with a tree ornament, in the likeness of the Capitol Dome and made from marble from the original east front steps of the House wing, by Ronald A. Sarasin, president of the U.S. Capitol Historical Society.
2001	White Spruce	72 feet (22 m)	Ottawa National Forest	Michigan	Known as "The Tree of Hope," the tree was lit by Dennis Hastert at 5 pm on December 11 in a ceremony on the West Front Lawn of the Capitol. The tree was hand picked by Architect of the Capitol landscape architect Matthew Evans on June 25 and was approximately 70 years old and weighted 4,000 pounds (1.8 t). Harvested in mid November, the tree arrived at the Capitol at 10 am on December 2 and was subsequently decorated with some 6,000 ornaments crafted and donated by the people of Michigan along with 10,000 blue, amber, and clear lights. The tree remained lit from dusk to midnight each night through January 2, 2002.
2000	Colorado blue spruce	65 feet (20 m)	Pike National Forest	Colorado	Selected by Architect of the Capitol landscape architect Matthew Evans in the summer of 2000, the tree was transported to the Capitol on a 64-foot flatbed truck driven by Colorado Senator Ben Nighthorse Campbell and decorated to look like a Conestoga wagon; the tree arrived at the Capitol around 10 am on December 4. The tree was lit by Dennis Hastert at 5:30 pm on December 12 in a ceremony including performances by the Summit Choral Society, a section of the United States Air Force Band, and the Congressional Chorus. Some 6,400 ornaments made by school children from all of Colorado's 64 districts adorned the tree along with 10,000 blue, white, and amber lights. The tree remained lit from 5 pm to midnight each night through January 2, 2001.
1999	White Spruce	60 feet (18 m)	Nicolet National Forest	Wisconsin	After being selected during the summer of 1999 from twenty candidates by Architect of the Capitol landscape architect Matthew Evans, the tree was shipped by train to the Capitol and arrived on November 29. Decorated with some 4,000 ornaments crafted and donated by people from Wisconsin, and 10,000 blue, clear, and amber lights, the tree was lit by Dennis Hastert at 5 pm on December 9. The lighting ceremony included performances by the Congressional Chorus, the United States Army Band, and the Wisconsin Youth Leadership Academy YMCA Boy's Choir. First tree named "Holiday Tree" instead of "Christmas Tree"
1998	Fraser Fir	50 feet (15 m)	Pisgah National Forest	North Carolina	Lit by Newt Gingrich at 5:30 pm on December 8 in a ceremony including performances by the Congressional Chorus, and the New Day Singers from Asheville, North Carolina. The tree was decorated with some 4,000 ornaments made by North Carolina school children along with 10,000 blue, clear, and amber lights. The tree remained lit from 5 pm to midnight each night through January 2, 1999.
1997	Black Hills Spruce	63 feet (19 m)	Black Hills National Forest	South Dakota	
1996	Engelmann Spruce	75 feet (23 m)	Manti La Sal National Forest	Utah	
1995	Douglas Fir	60 feet (18 m)	Plumas National Forest	California	
1994	Balsam Fir	58 feet (18 m)	Green Mountain National Forest	Vermont	
1993	White fir	65 feet (20 m)	San Bernardino National Forest	California	The 70 feet (21 m) tree (original size) was decorated with some 4,000 ornaments made by children using recycled materials. The tree was cut down by a married couple from Willits, California Richard and Suzanne Sagan after winning a logging competition in each of their divisions in Idyllwild, southern California. The Sagan's with their boys (Cody and Heath) were flown back to the capitol to assist in the lighting of the tree with house speaker Tom Foley at the US Capitol.
1992	White Spruce	62 feet (19 m)	Chippewa National Forest	Minnesota	
1991	Blue spruce	60 feet (18 m)	Carson National Forest	New Mexico	
1990	Engelmann Spruce	65 feet (20 m)	Routt National Forest	Colorado	
1989	Engelmann Spruce	60 feet (18 m)	Kootenai National Forest	Montana	
1988	Balsam Fir	50 feet (15 m)	Manistee National Forest	Michigan	
1987	Norway Spruce	60 feet (18 m)	Wayne National Forest	Ohio	
1986	Shasta Red Fir	54 feet (16 m)	Klamath National Forest	California	
1985	White Spruce	56 feet (17 m)	Ottawa National Forest	Michigan	
1984	White Spruce	58 feet (18 m)	Superior National Forest	Minnesota	
1983	White Spruce	52 feet (16 m)	Chequamegon National Forest	Wisconsin	
1982	Balsam Fir	50 feet (15 m)	Riley Bostwich Wildlife Management Area	Vermont	
1981	White Spruce	50 feet (15 m)	Hiawatha National Forest	Michigan	
1980	White Spruce	48 feet (15 m)	Green Mountain National Forest	Vermont	
1979	White Spruce	52 feet (16 m)	Nicolet National Forest	Wisconsin	
1978	Norway Spruce	60 feet (18 m)	Savage River State Forest	Maryland	
1977	White Spruce	52 feet (16 m)	Nemadji State Forest	Minnesota	
1976	Red Spruce	41 feet (12 m)	Monongahela National Forest	West Virginia	
1975	Balsam Fir	41 feet (12 m)	Ottawa National Forest	Michigan	
1974	Fraser Fir	41 feet (12 m)	Pisgah National Forest	North Carolina	
1973	White Spruce	51 feet (16 m)	Allegheny National Forest	Pennsylvania	
1972	Balsam Fir	50 feet (15 m)	Cherokee National Forest	Tennessee	
1971	Black Spruce	45 feet (14 m)	White Mountain National Forest	New Hampshire	
1970	Norway Spruce	40 feet (12 m)	Monongahela National Forest	West Virginia	
1969	White Pine	40 feet (12 m)	Westminster, Maryland	Maryland	
1968	White Pine	30 feet (9.1 m)	Finksburg, Maryland	Maryland	Made from two different trees
1967	Douglas Fir	24 feet (7.3 m)	Birdsboro, Pennsylvania	Pennsylvania	In 1963, John W. McCormack suggested that a Christmas Tree should be placed on the grounds. A live tree was purchased for $700 from Buddies Nurseries and planted on the West Front Lawn of the Capitol. This tree was decorated each year through 1967 until it was damaged by a wind storm in the Spring of 1967.
1966	Douglas Fir	24 feet (7.3 m)	Birdsboro, Pennsylvania	Pennsylvania	In 1963, John W. McCormack suggested that a Christmas Tree should be placed on the grounds. A live tree was purchased for $700 from Buddies Nurseries and planted on the West Front Lawn of the Capitol. This tree was decorated each year through 1967 until it was damaged by a wind storm in the Spring of 1967.
1965	Douglas Fir	24 feet (7.3 m)	Birdsboro, Pennsylvania	Pennsylvania	In 1963, John W. McCormack suggested that a Christmas Tree should be placed on the grounds. A live tree was purchased for $700 from Buddies Nurseries and planted on the West Front Lawn of the Capitol. This tree was decorated each year through 1967 until it was damaged by a wind storm in the Spring of 1967.
1964	Douglas Fir	24 feet (7.3 m)	Birdsboro, Pennsylvania	Pennsylvania	In 1963, John W. McCormack suggested that a Christmas Tree should be placed on the grounds. A live tree was purchased for $700 from Buddies Nurseries and planted on the West Front Lawn of the Capitol. This tree was decorated each year through 1967 until it was damaged by a wind storm in the Spring of 1967.
1963	Douglas Fir	24 feet (7.3 m)	Birdsboro, Pennsylvania	Pennsylvania	In 1963, John W. McCormack suggested that a Christmas Tree should be placed on the grounds. A live tree was purchased for $700 from Buddies Nurseries and planted on the West Front Lawn of the Capitol. This tree was decorated each year through 1967 until it was damaged by a wind storm in the Spring of 1967.

== Gallery ==
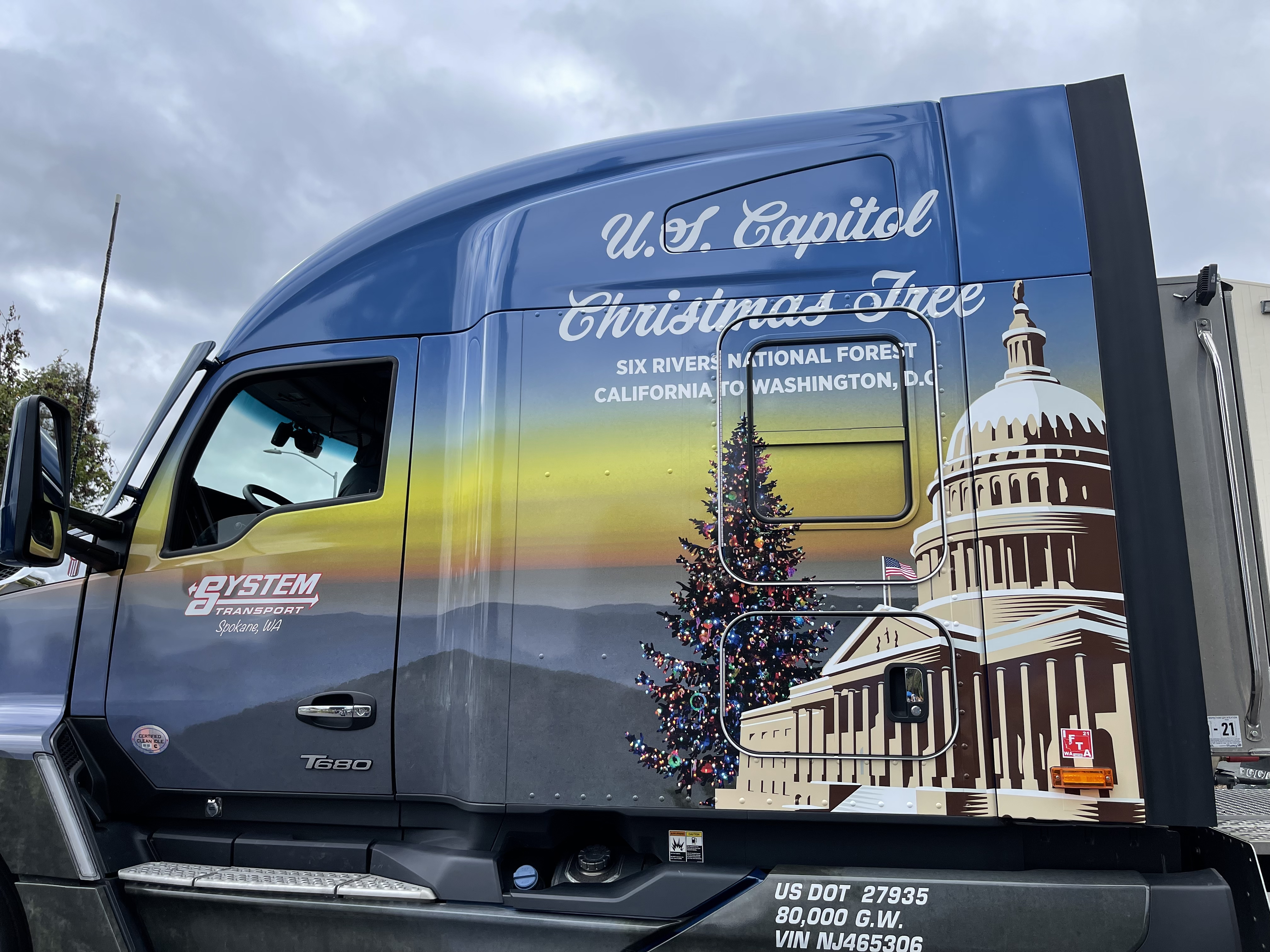
Special semi-truck wrap for the 2021 Capitol Christmas Tree

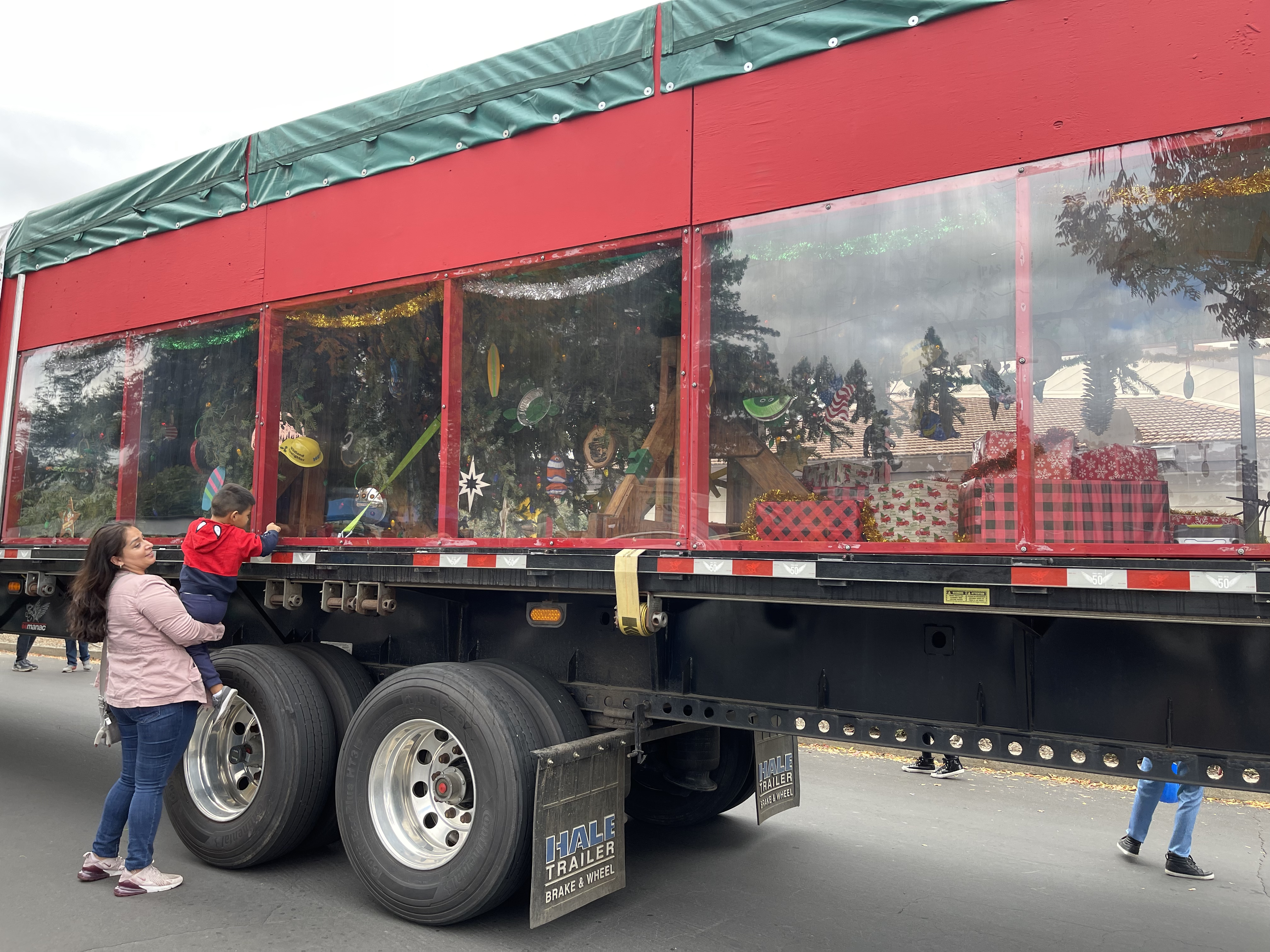
2021 Capitol Christmas Tree in its transport

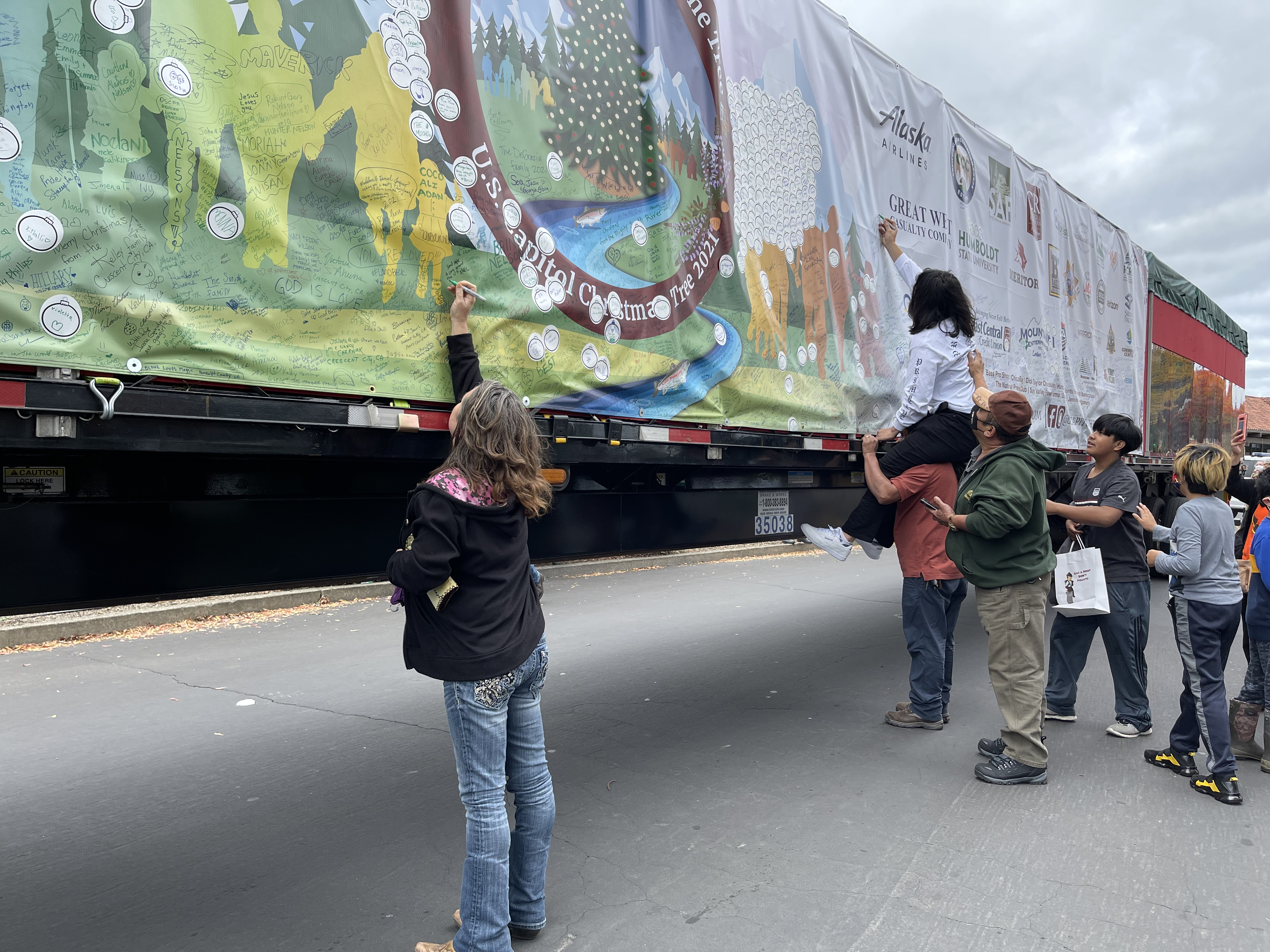
People signing the truck transporting the 2021 Capitol Christmas Tree at an event in Ukiah, California

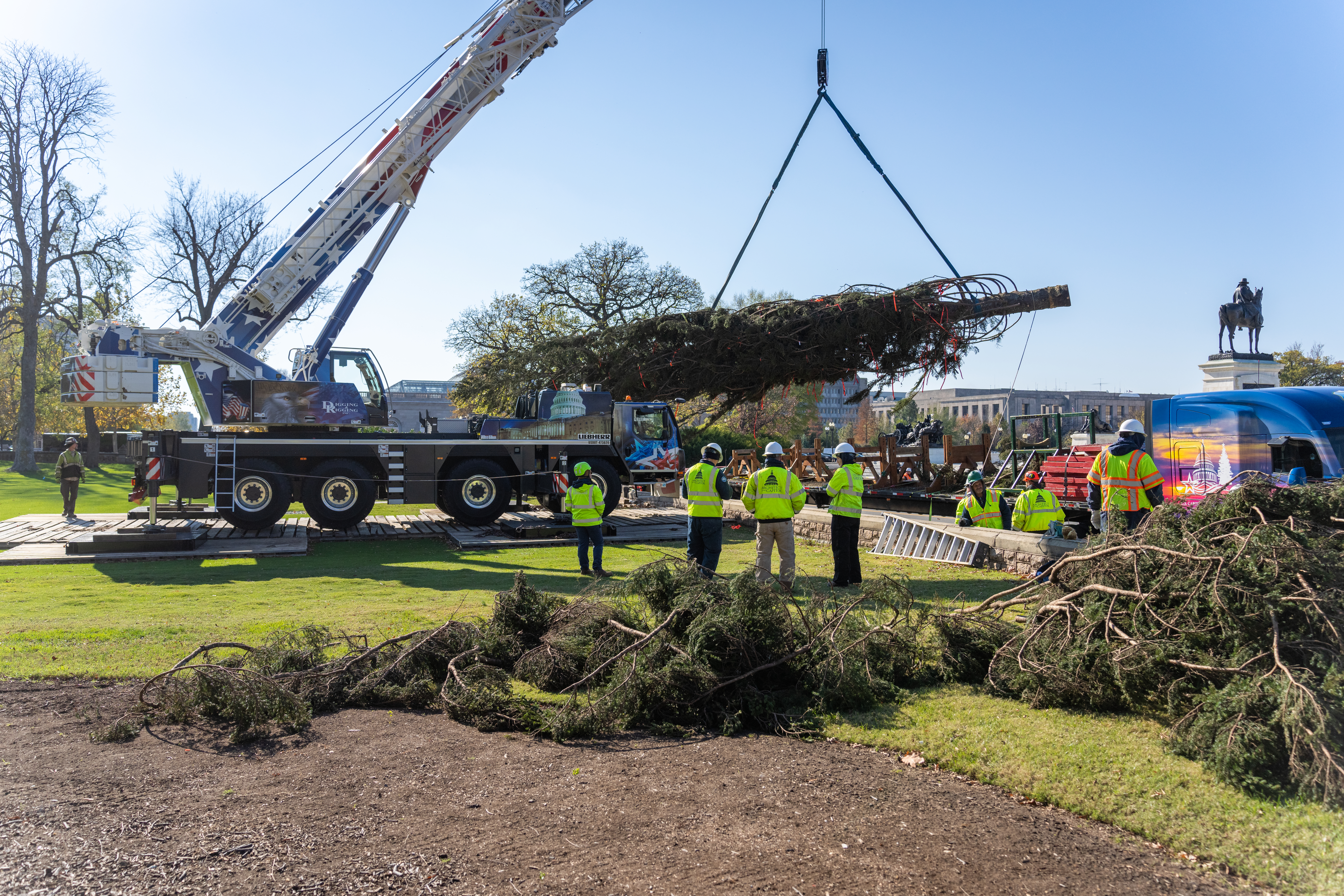
Arrival of the 2022 Capitol Christmas Tree

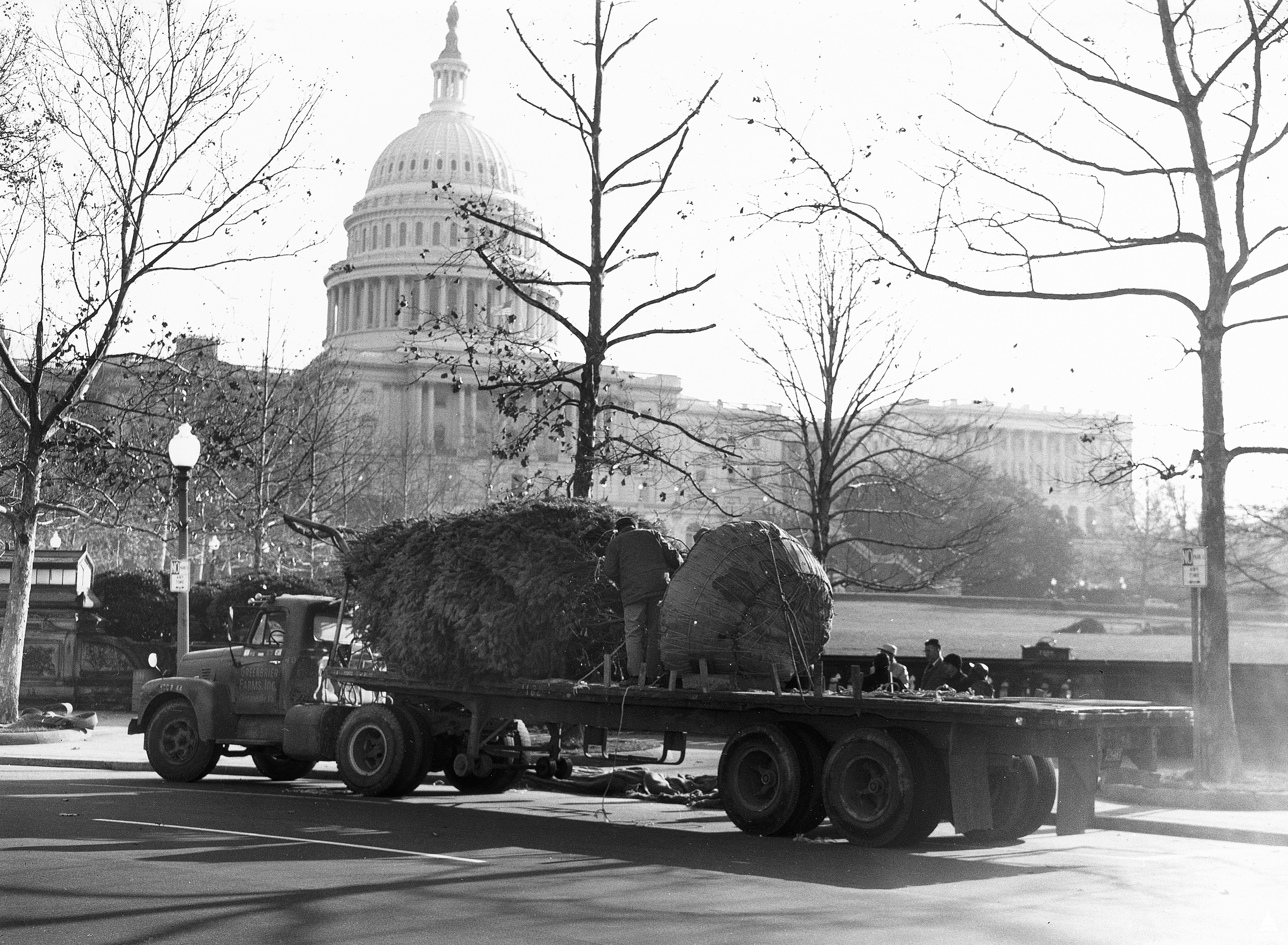
Arrival of the 1964 Capitol Christmas Tree

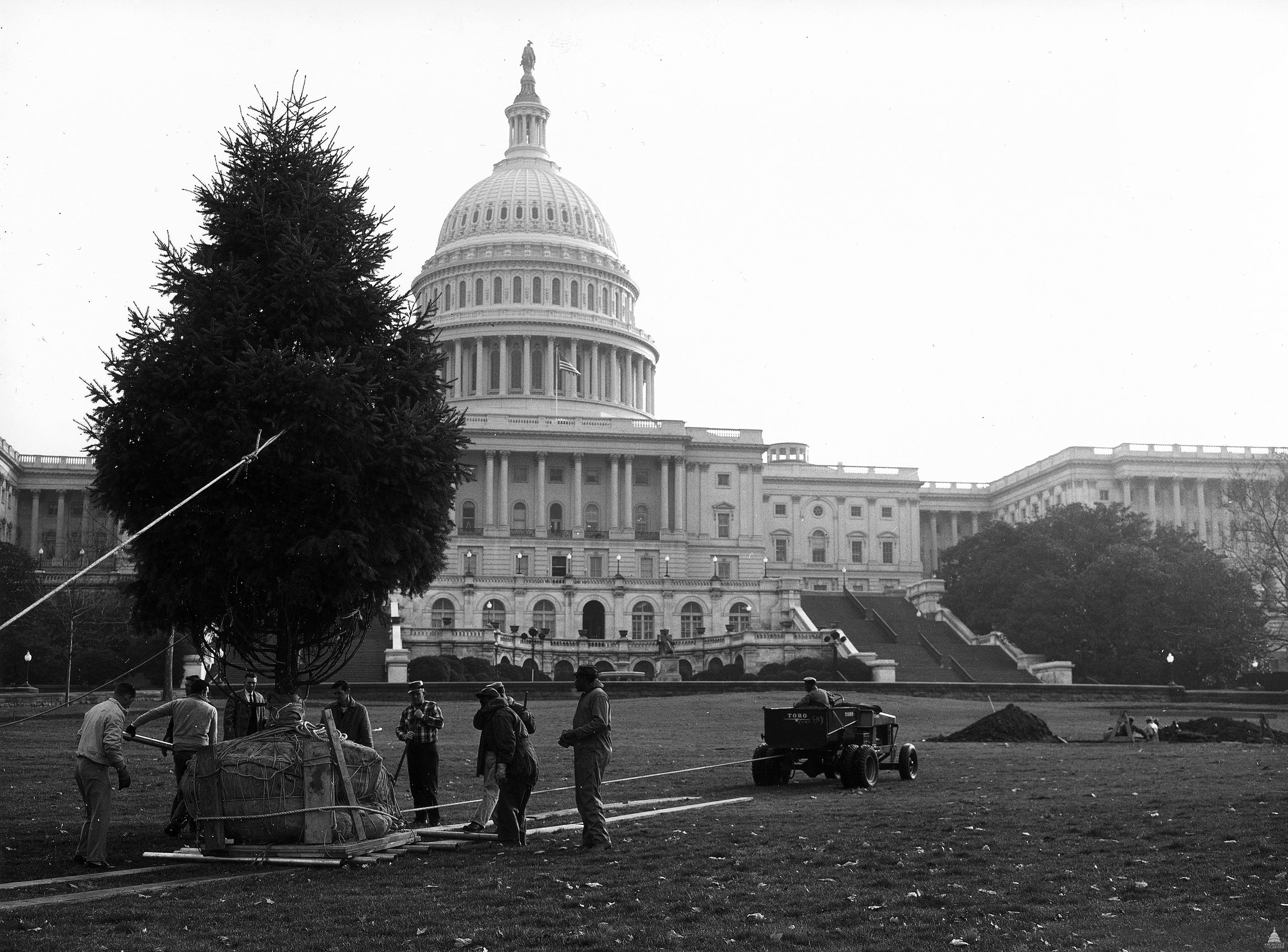
Planting of the 1964 Capitol Christmas Tree

== See also ==
- White House Christmas tree
- National Christmas Tree (United States)
- Rockefeller Center Christmas Tree
- Vatican Christmas Tree
- List of individual trees
