= Young Park =

Young Park, or variations including Young's Park or Youngs Park, may refer to:

in Canada

- Young's Point Provincial Park, in Alberta
- Youngs Harbor Park in Keswick, Ontario

in the United States

- Young Park (Las Cruces, New Mexico)
- Lake Youngs Park, in Washington state
