= Soos Creek =

Creek located in King County, Washington

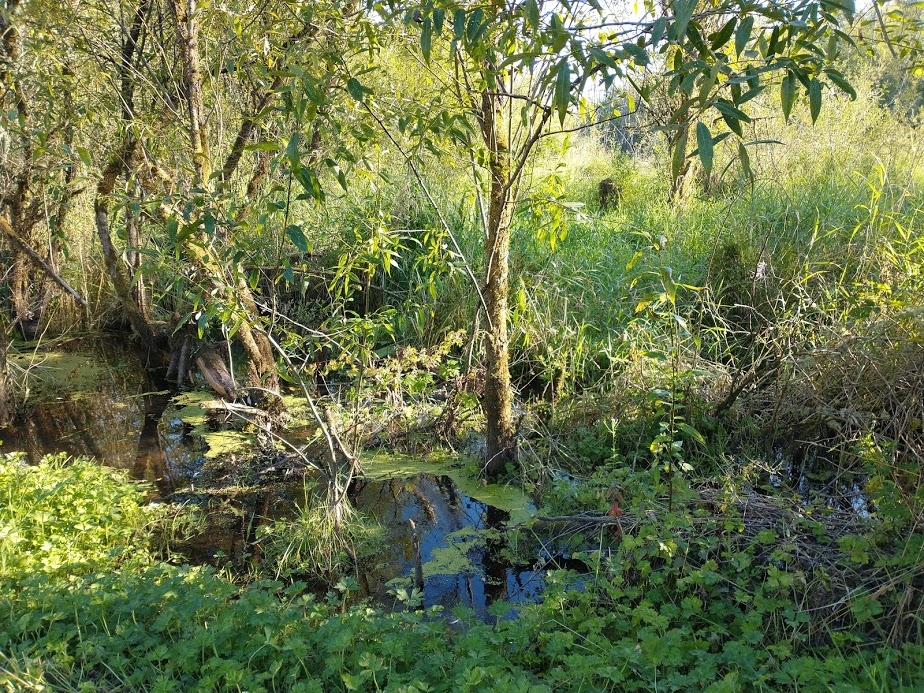
- Big Soos Creek

- Location of mouth

Location
- Country: United States
- State: Washington
- County: King County

Physical characteristics
- Mouth
  - coordinates: 47°18′10″N 122°10′33″W

Basin features
- Progression: Green River, Puget Sound

Soos Creek is a creek located in King County, Washington, United States, which drains into the Green River which ends in the Puget Sound. The upper part of the creek is divided into Big Soos Creek and Little Soos Creek, which join together near State Route 516 in Covington. Big Soos originates from small ponds located in Cascade-Fairwood, while Little Soos originates from the Lake Youngs reservoir.

A salmon hatchery is located on the creek near its mouth east of Auburn.

== Recreation ==
Big Soos Creek is joined by the Soos Creek Trail, a paved recreational trail that is about 5.9 miles (9.5 km) long.
