= Seattle–Tacoma International Airport =

Airport serving Seattle, Washington, United States

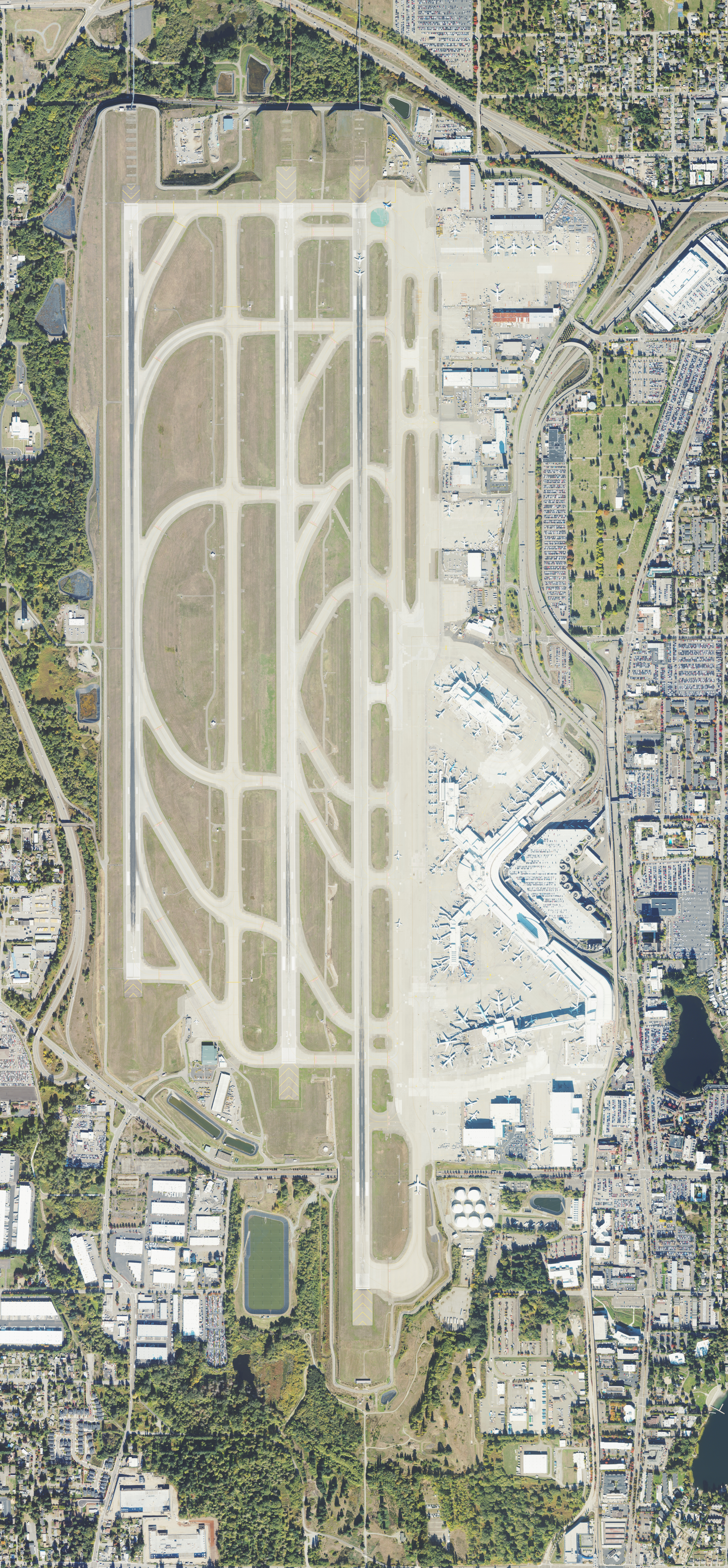
- IATA: SEA; ICAO: KSEA; FAA LID: SEA; WMO: 72793

Summary
- Airport type: Public
- Owner/Operator: Port of Seattle
- Serves: Seattle metropolitan area; Puget Sound region
- Location: SeaTac, Washington, U.S.
- Opened: October 31, 1944; 82 years ago
- Hub for: Alaska Airlines; Delta Air Lines
- Time zone: PST (UTC−08:00)
  - Summer (DST): PDT (UTC−07:00)
- Elevation AMSL: 132 m (433 ft)
- Coordinates: 47°26′56″N 122°18′34″W
- Public transit access: 64 SeaTac/Airport
- Website: portseattle.org/sea-tac

Maps
- FAA airport diagram
- Interactive map of Seattle–Tacoma International Airport

Runways
Direction	Length		Surface
Direction	m	ft	Surface
16L/34R	3,627	11,901	Concrete
16C/34C	2,873	9,426	Concrete
16R/34L	2,591	8,500	Concrete

Statistics (2025)
- Passengers: 52,715,181
- Aircraft movements: 435,896
- Cargo (metric tons): 427,971
- Sources: FAA and airport website

Seattle–Tacoma International Airport (Note: Branded as SEA Airport and also referred to as Sea–Tac /ˈsiːtæk/.) (IATA: SEA, ICAO: KSEA, FAA LID: SEA) is the primary international airport serving Seattle and its surrounding metropolitan area in the U.S. state of Washington. It is in the city of SeaTac, which was named after the airport's nickname Sea–Tac, approximately 14 miles (23 km) south of downtown Seattle and 18 miles (29 km) north-northeast of downtown Tacoma. The airport is the busiest in the Pacific Northwest region of North America and is owned by the Port of Seattle.

The entire airport covers an area of 2,500 acres (1,000 hectares) and has three parallel runways. It is the primary hub for Alaska Airlines, whose headquarters are near the airport. The airport is also a hub and international gateway for Delta Air Lines, which has expanded at the airport since 2011. As of 2026, 37 airlines operate at Sea–Tac, serving 96 domestic and 37 international destinations in North America, Oceania, Europe, the Middle East, and Asia.

Sea–Tac was developed in the 1940s to replace Boeing Field, which had been converted to military use during World War II. A site near Bow Lake was chosen in 1942 and construction began the following year with funding from the federal government, Port of Seattle, and the City of Tacoma. The airport opened on October 31, 1944. The first scheduled commercial flights from the airport began in September 1947 and the terminal was dedicated on July 9, 1949. Sea–Tac was expanded in 1961 to accommodate jetliners and added new concourses and satellite terminals by 1973. The main runway was extended several times and twinned in 1970; the third runway opened in 2008 following several decades of planning due to local opposition.

Several major concourse expansions and renovations were initiated in the 2010s to accommodate passenger growth at Sea–Tac, which had become a new hub for Delta Air Lines. A new international arrivals facility opened in 2022 as part of the program. In 2023, Sea–Tac served 50,887,260 passengers, 2% below its previous record set in 2019.

By 2025, Seattle–Tacoma International Airport set an all-time record with 52,715,181 passengers served.

== History ==
=== Construction and early growth (1942–1967) ===
A shared public airport was proposed by the Port of Seattle and Port of Tacoma in the late 1920s, but deferred plans after the legality of public ports operating such facilities was rejected by the state attorney general in a published opinion. The state legislature authorized municipal corporations such as public ports to establish aviation facilities in 1941. The Port of Seattle accepted a $1 million grant (equivalent to $15.6 million in 2025 dollars) from the Civil Aeronautics Administration in March 1942 to construct a new airport to serve the Seattle area after the U.S. military took control of Boeing Field during World War II. A site on U.S. Route 99 near Bow Lake south of Seattle was chosen at the end of the month ahead of another candidate near Lake Sammamish that was considered too close to the Cascade Range. The City of Tacoma provided $100,000 towards the airport's construction costs as part of a deal for the Bow Lake site, centered around an existing private airfield plagued by heavy fog. Construction of the airport, which was named Seattle–Tacoma in recognition of Tacoma's contribution, began with a groundbreaking ceremony on January 2, 1943.

The project was originally estimated to cost $1.7 million (equivalent to $24.7 million in 2025 dollars), but the sandy soil conditions drove the final construction price to over $4.2 million (equivalent to $60.9 million in 2025 dollars). The airport's plateau was formed through 6.5 million cubic yards (5,000,000 m^{3}) of excavated earth. A proposal to rename the airport for Boeing president Philip G. Johnson shortly after his death in September 1944 was rejected by Port of Seattle commissioners due to the objections of Tacoma. The first ceremonial landing at Seattle–Tacoma Airport was made on October 31, 1944, by a United Air Lines DC-3 carrying local elected officials and civic leaders. The first commercial flights launched in May 1945 with Northwest Airlines, but use was limited due to the U.S. Army Air Force's need for the airport to stage Boeing B-29 bombers for delivery. Various airlines had irregular flights to the airport, which used a Quonset hut with limited heating as a terminal until a permanent building was financed by a bond issue that voters approved in 1946.

The first scheduled commercial flights began on September 1, 1947, with Northwest Airlines and Western Airlines operating ten daily departures. They were joined by United, Alaska, Trans-Canada, Western, and Pan Am by 1951 as airlines departed from Boeing Field. The terminal at the renamed Seattle–Tacoma International Airport was formally dedicated by Governor Arthur Langlie on July 9, 1949, in front of a crowd of 30,000 spectators. The 71,000-square-foot (6,600 m^{2}) building, designed by architect Herman A. Moldenhour, included a rooftop control tower and glass curtain walls in the concourses. The 907-acre (367 ha) airport originally had four runways at 45-degree angles, between 5,000 and 6,100 feet (1,500 and 1,900 m) long, for crosswind operations. The two perpendicular runways were arranged into an "X"-shape that intersected near the longest, north–south runway; an additional runway to the south ran east–west. The terminal building's "inverted V" shape was arranged to match the runway layout. The north–south runway (now Runway 16L/34R) was lengthened to 7,500 ft (2,300 m) in 1950 at a cost of $900,000, to 8,500 ft (2,600 m) in 1955, and to 10,200 ft (3,100 m) in 1958 to support commercial jetliners.

The enlargement of the airport's runways was precipitated by the major augmentation of commercial air traffic in the 1950s. Larger aircraft such as the Douglas DC-6, which introduced a pressurized cabin; the DC-7; Lockheed Constellations; and Boeing 377 Stratocruisers were some of the last turboprops to fly long-distance from Seattle. By 1957, Sea-Tac hosted 400 flights per week, with United as the largest carrier, offering 260 of those. The Boeing 367-80 or Dash-80, the first aircraft to demonstrate the potential of jet aviation, was accommodated by the 1955 runway extension when it first flew into Sea-Tac on September 27, 1956. The first regular jet service to Sea-Tac was provided by Pan Am on October 3, 1959, when a Boeing 707 departed for Honolulu. In 1961 Alaska introduced Convair 880 service on its lucrative Anchorage–Seattle flights after Northwest and Pan Am had introduced the type on the same route, which reduced flying time to three hours from the eight-hour, multi-stop journey on piston-engined planes. Braniff and United introduced an interchange service between Houston and Seattle on DC-6s, where the airline crews switched on the stopover in Denver; by 1965 the DC-6s had been replaced by Boeing 720s. United, meanwhile became the first carrier to serve Sea-Tac with Douglas DC-8s when it introduced them on the routes to Chicago and Idlewild (now JFK) Airport in New York. By 1962 Northwest offered flights from Sea-Tac to six destinations, including Portland, Honolulu, Anchorage, Spokane, and Chicago, while Pan Am served Fairbanks, Honolulu and offered transatlantic service to London. Western Airlines introduced 720 service from Sea-Tac on routes to Portland, Minneapolis-St. Paul, Los Angeles, and San Francisco after acquiring Pacific Northern Airways in 1967. Jet service on 707s and its sister 720s was augmented with the addition of the three-engine Boeing 727 in the mid-1960s, which allowed passenger numbers to double at Sea-Tac during that decade. Alaska introduced these on service to Anchorage and Sitka in 1966, while Braniff International had service on the 727 to both San Antonio and Dallas in 1967, and Western introduced it on service to Seattle in 1970.

The first parking lot at Sea–Tac opened in 1955 with room for 527 vehicles. The United States Postal Service opened its air mail terminal at the airport in 1957 to serve areas west of the Mississippi River and mail bound for Asia; other government agencies, including the Weather Bureau and the Customs Service also established offices at Sea–Tac. On June 28, 1959, Japan Airlines became the first international carrier from Asia to operate at Sea–Tac when it began its service to Tokyo. Several projects were completed by 1961 to prepare for the Seattle World's Fair the following year, including a runway extension over South 188th Street, which was placed in an automobile tunnel that opened in July 1961. During construction of the runway extension in February 1961, the fossilized skeleton of a Megalonyx jeffersonii giant sloth was discovered and excavated for display at the Burke Museum in Seattle. The two-story North Concourse (later named Concourse D) opened a month later with four gate positions to prepare for regular jetliner service; the concourse's wing was 600 feet (180 m) long and 30 feet (9.1 m) wide. The 688-foot-long (210 m) South Concourse (now Concourse A) opened in May 1961 alongside an expanded parking lot with capacity for 2,000 vehicles.

The 800-foot (240 m) long Concourse B opened in December 1964. It added eight gate positions, bringing the total to 19, a 12,000 square feet (1,100 m^{2}) area housing international arrivals and the offices of U.S. Customs, Immigration, Public Health and the Department of Agriculture. Concourse C opened in July 1966. Four years later, it was extended to include another 10 gates, bringing the total to 35. The first non-stop flights from Sea–Tac to mainland Europe began in September 1966 with Scandinavian Airlines, who used a polar route to reach Copenhagen. A parallel second runway was completed 800 feet (240 m) west of the main runway in 1970.

=== Later expansions and third runway (1967–2008) ===
The Port embarked on a major expansion plan, designed by The Richardson Associates and lasting from 1967 to 1973, adding a second runway, a parking garage, two satellite terminals and other improvements. In 1973, $28 million new terminal was built over and around the 1949 structure; the new terminal quadrupled the area for public use. On July 1, 1973, the airport opened two new satellite terminals, along with an underground train system to connect them to the Main Terminal. These fully automatic shuttle trains were among the first of their kind in the United States. Also unprecedented in any U.S. airport: as part of the expansion the Port commissioned $300,000 worth of artworks; these were the start of what would become a large public art collection owned by the Port.

In the mid-1980s, the Main Terminal was renovated and another 150 feet (46 m) was added to the north end. Concourse D was expanded in 1987 with a rotunda that added four new gates. In 1993, Concourses B, C, and D were renovated. The project, designed by NBBJ, included the addition of 150,000 square feet (14,000 m^{2}) and the renovation of 170,000 square feet (16,000 m^{2}) of space in Concourses B, C, and D. On June 15, 2004, the 2,102-foot (641 m) new Concourse A was unveiled with 14 new gates, a dozen new restaurants, new artwork and the airport's first moving sidewalks.

Residents of the surrounding area filed lawsuits against the Port in the early 1970s, complaining of noise, vibration, smoke, and other problems. The Port and the government of King County adopted the Sea–Tac Communities Plan in 1976 to address problems and guide future development. The Port spent more than $100 million over the next decade to buy homes and school buildings in the vicinity, and soundproof others nearby. In the mid-1980s, the airport participated in the airport noise-compatibility program initiated by Congress in 1979. Airport-noise contours were developed, real estate was purchased and some homes were retrofitted to achieve noise mitigation.

In 1978 the U.S. ended airline regulation, and the U.S. airlines were allowed to determine routes and fares without government approval. Deregulation resulted in some new service to Seattle, including from TWA, then the fourth-largest U.S. airline, as well as Delta, National, and American.

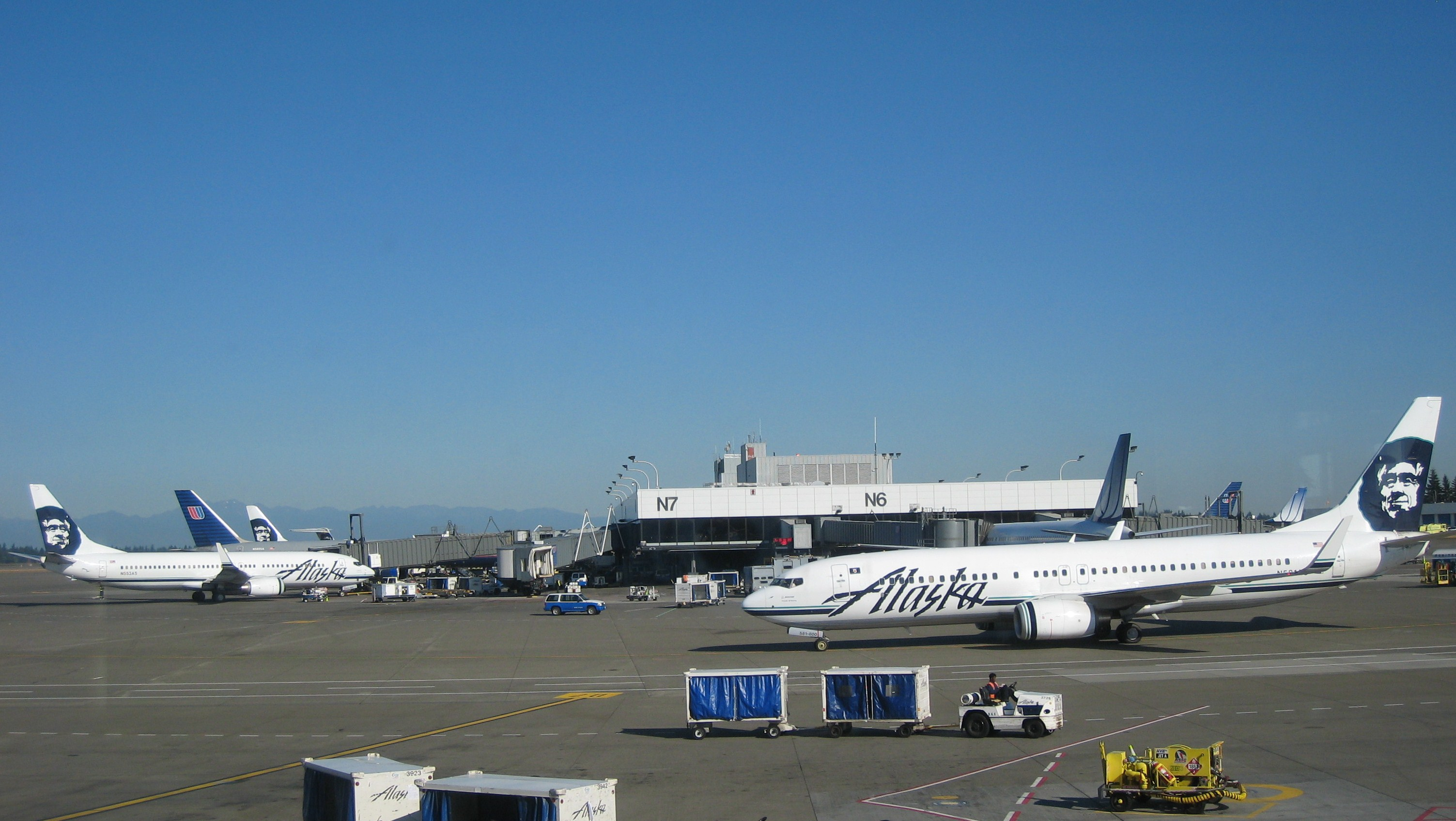
Alaska and United planes at the North Satellite Terminal in 2008

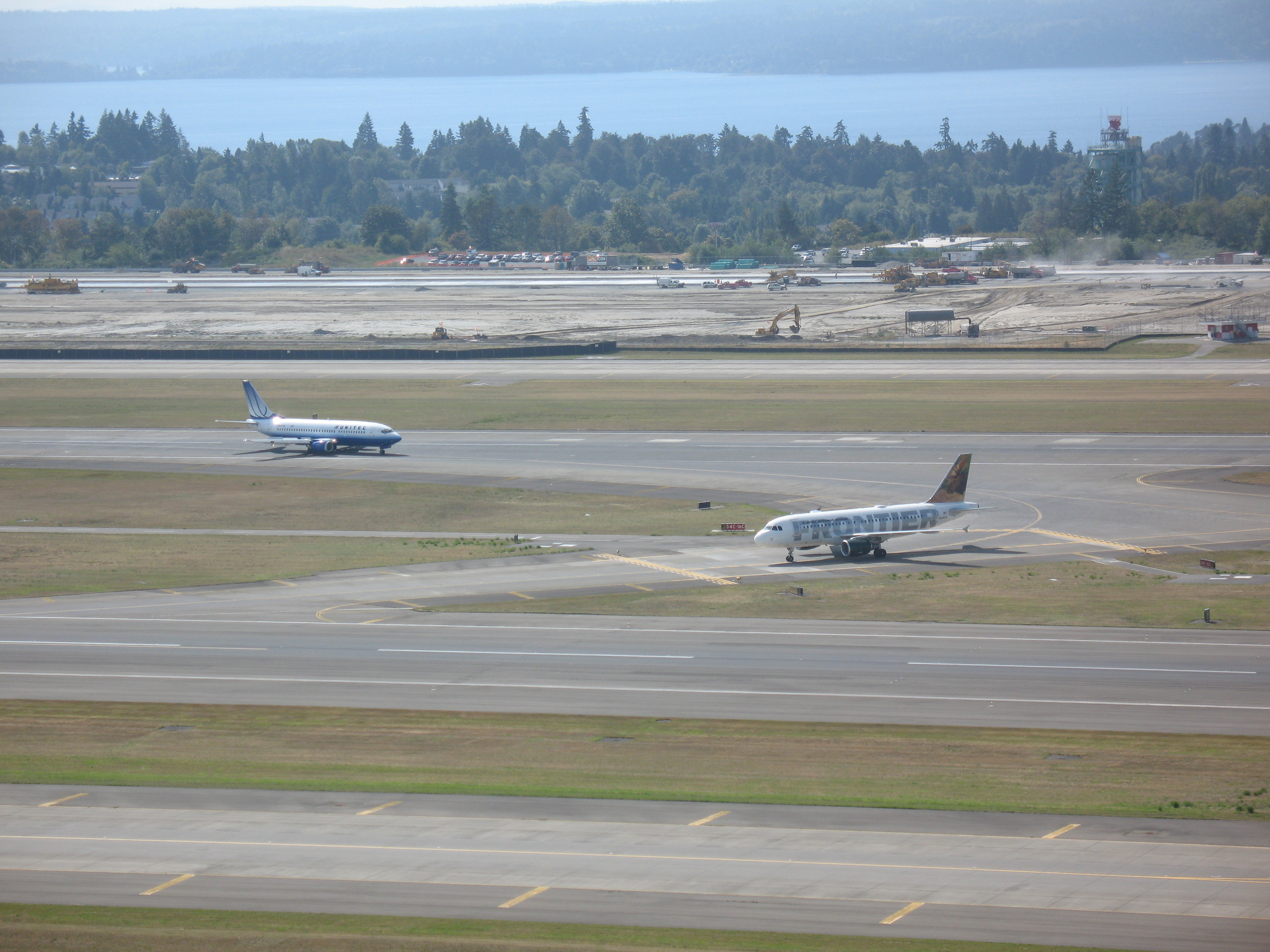
Sea–Tac Airport in September 2007 as runway 16R/34L was under construction (opened November 2008)

Shortly after the death of U.S. Senator Henry Martin "Scoop" Jackson, the Port Commission voted on September 13, 1983, to change the airport's name to the Henry M. Jackson International Airport. Citizens of Tacoma were angered by the removal of their city's name despite their contribution to the airport's original construction budget, which had come with a promise to share the name. An additional complicating factor was the existence of another Jackson International Airport (now Jackson–Medgar Wiley Evers International Airport) in Jackson, Mississippi. During the November 1983 elections, an advisory referendum in Tacoma on the airport's name endorsed the original name by a 4–1 margin and two incumbent Port commissioners were defeated by candidates in favor of restoring the Sea–Tac name. Helen Jackson, the widow of the late senator, expressed her desire that their family remain neutral in the debate. With a 3–2 vote of the Port Commission on February 28, 1984, the name reverted to Seattle–Tacoma International Airport and the four signs with Jackson's name were removed.

In the late 1980s, the Port of Seattle and a council representing local county governments considered the future of air traffic in the region and predicted that the airport could reach capacity by 2000. The rising use of regional airliners such as Horizon Air caused aircraft movements to triple from 1978 to 1990 and air cargo use at the airport had also risen dramatically. In 1992, the planning committee concluded that the best solution was to add a third runway to the airport and construct a supplemental two-runway airport in one of the neighboring counties. Members of the community opposed a third runway, as did the Highline School District and the cities of Des Moines, Burien, Federal Way, Tukwila, and Normandy Park, but a 1994 study concluded there were no feasible sites for an additional airport. The Port of Seattle approved a plan for the new runway in 1996, prompting a lawsuit from opponents. The Port secured the necessary permits by agreeing to noise reduction programs and environmental protections. Runway opponents appealed these permits, but dropped their challenges in 2004.

The third runway, measuring 8,500 feet (2,600 m) long, opened on November 20, 2008, with a construction cost of $1.1 billion. Parallel to the existing two, the new runway is 2,500 ft (760 m) west of runway 34R, allowing landings on both in times of low visibility. The older runways are 800 ft (240 m) apart, too close to allow use of both in low visibility. The third runway project included 13 million cubic yards (9,900,000 m^{3}) of fill dirt and several retaining walls, the longest of which is 1,430 feet (440 m) long and 130 feet (40 m) tall.

=== Modernization and expansion (2008–present) ===
The airport's Central Terminal building was renovated and expanded in 2003 in a project designed by Curtis W. Fentress, of Fentress Architects. The renovation and expansion began in 1996 and underwent extensive modifications to accommodate new security requirements following the September 11 attacks in 2001.

In 2014, Delta Air Lines announced plans to expand Seattle into a transpacific hub. Since then, Delta has added numerous international flights and dozens of domestic flights to feed those services. Delta's increased presence in Seattle has been seen by some industry analysts as a response to United Airlines' transpacific hub at San Francisco, as well as Delta's disenchantment with its former Tokyo–Narita hub.

In late 2021, shortly after Alaska Airlines joined American Airlines in the Oneworld alliance, American announced that they would increase their international presence in Seattle. However, as of 2023, American had abandoned plans for long-haul flights to Asia from Seattle (including its proposed service to Bangalore, India) and ended service to London-Heathrow, their only intercontinental service from Seattle.

The North Satellite Terminal only received limited upgrades since it opened in 1973, and needed modernization. The Port of Seattle initially looked at simply updating the terminal in a project it called the North Satellite Renovation Plan (NorthSTAR). In 2016, the Port announced it would also significantly expand the terminal. The $550 million project called the North Satellite Modernization increased the size of the North Satellite by 201,000 square feet (18,700 m^{2}) and another eight gates, bringing the total to 20. The project's first phase, dedicated on July 11, 2019, expanded the terminal to the west by 240 feet (73 m) and added eight gates, a mezzanine level with eateries, and a rooftop lounge for Alaska Airlines. The second phase modernized the remaining areas of the old terminal and expands dining and retail space around the twenty existing gates. The new terminal opened on June 29, 2021.

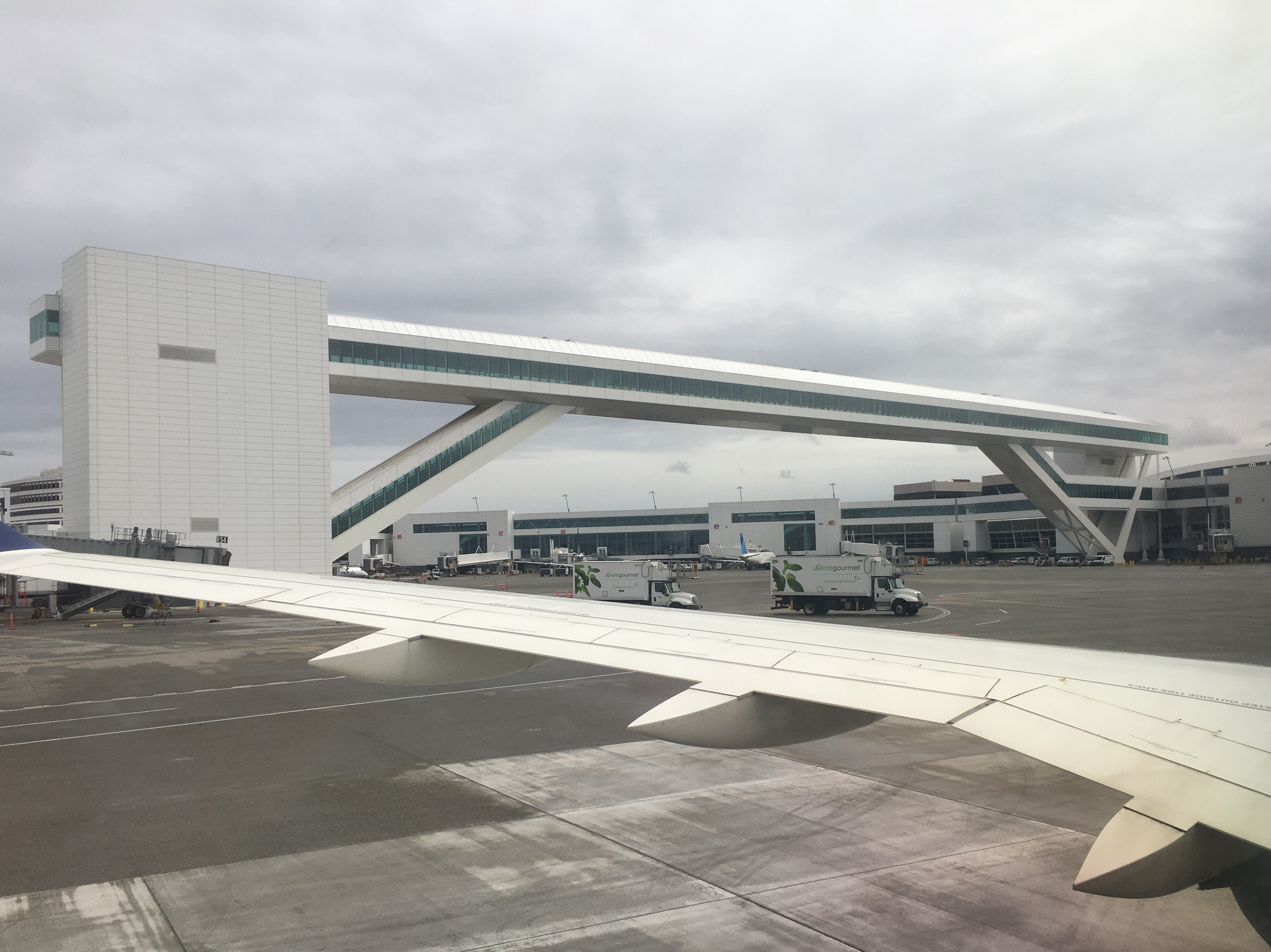
The IAF Pedestrian Walkway at Sea-Tac.

In 2022, the Port of Seattle completed a new 450,000-square-foot (42,000 m^{2}) International Arrivals Facility (IAF) east of Concourse A, along with a 900-foot (270 m)-long high bridge that will take passengers from the South Satellite, up 85 feet (26 m) above the existing taxiway and over the top of Concourse A. The project was initially expected to be completed by 2021 at a cost of $766 million, though revised to $968 million in late 2018. The old customs and immigration facility was located in the basement of the South Satellite, and operated well over its design capacity. Additionally, the process for passengers was complicated by the satellite's isolated location. With the opening of the new IAF, Concourse A will now also be used for arriving international flights, nearly doubling the number of gates capable of serving arriving international passengers. The South Satellite Terminal is also planned to be renovated. The IAF was initially designed to accommodate 20 widebody aircraft, but four gates were not built to those specifications; the discrepancy was described as a "design flaw" by the Port of Seattle and blamed on the project's contractor.

The airport's digital infrastructure, including its website, phone lines, check-in system, and automated baggage sorting, was disabled by a cyberattack on August 24, 2024. Most of the systems were restored by August 31, but the Port of Seattle websites and passenger information systems remained offline.

=== Future ===
The airport has seen record growth in passenger traffic in the 2010s and 2020s. The busiest day for outbound passengers was July 24, 2023, with 73,651 passengers; more than 198,000 passengers (departing, arriving, and connecting) passed through the airport that day. The previous record for outbound passengers was set on August 16, 2019, at 72,154. The growth has been partly fueled by the nationwide expansion of Seattle-based Alaska Airlines and by Delta Air Lines setting up a major international hub at SEA Airport. That growth has strained the airport's facilities and led the port to invest more than $2 billion into several expansion and renovation projects.

The airport has six outbound baggage handling systems with limited to no cross-connectivity. The system now in place is aging and reaching its maximum capacity. A $320.4 million project will create one unified, high-speed baggage system under the airport. That will allow bags to be checked from any ticketing counter, to receive security screening faster, and to be routed to any gate in the airport. The extra efficiency and speed will allow the airport to handle more baggage in the future without expanding the footprint of the baggage handling systems. The initial phase of the project was finished in 2018 and the entire system is scheduled to be completed in 2027.

With estimates that the Puget Sound region will grow by another one million people by 2035, the Port of Seattle began developing the Sustainable Airport Master Plan (SAMP) in 2018 to meet passenger and cargo demands. The SAMP recommends more than 30 projects to improve efficiency and airport access, including a new terminal with 19 gates and an automated people mover through three separate stations. Near-term projects that are scheduled to be completed in the 2020s include restroom renovations, security checkpoint expansion, and roadway realignment. A four-story addition to the existing structure of Concourse C began in 2023 and is scheduled to be completed in 2027 at a cost of $399 million; it includes a "central gathering place" under a large wooden ceiling. Further projects include an automated parking garage guidance system, a gateway project in cooperation with Alaska Airlines, Concourse A building expansion for lounges, improved curbside safety and accessibility, continued refurbishment of the Central Terminal, and a replacement of controls pertaining to the SEA Underground shuttles.

== Facilities ==
=== Terminals ===
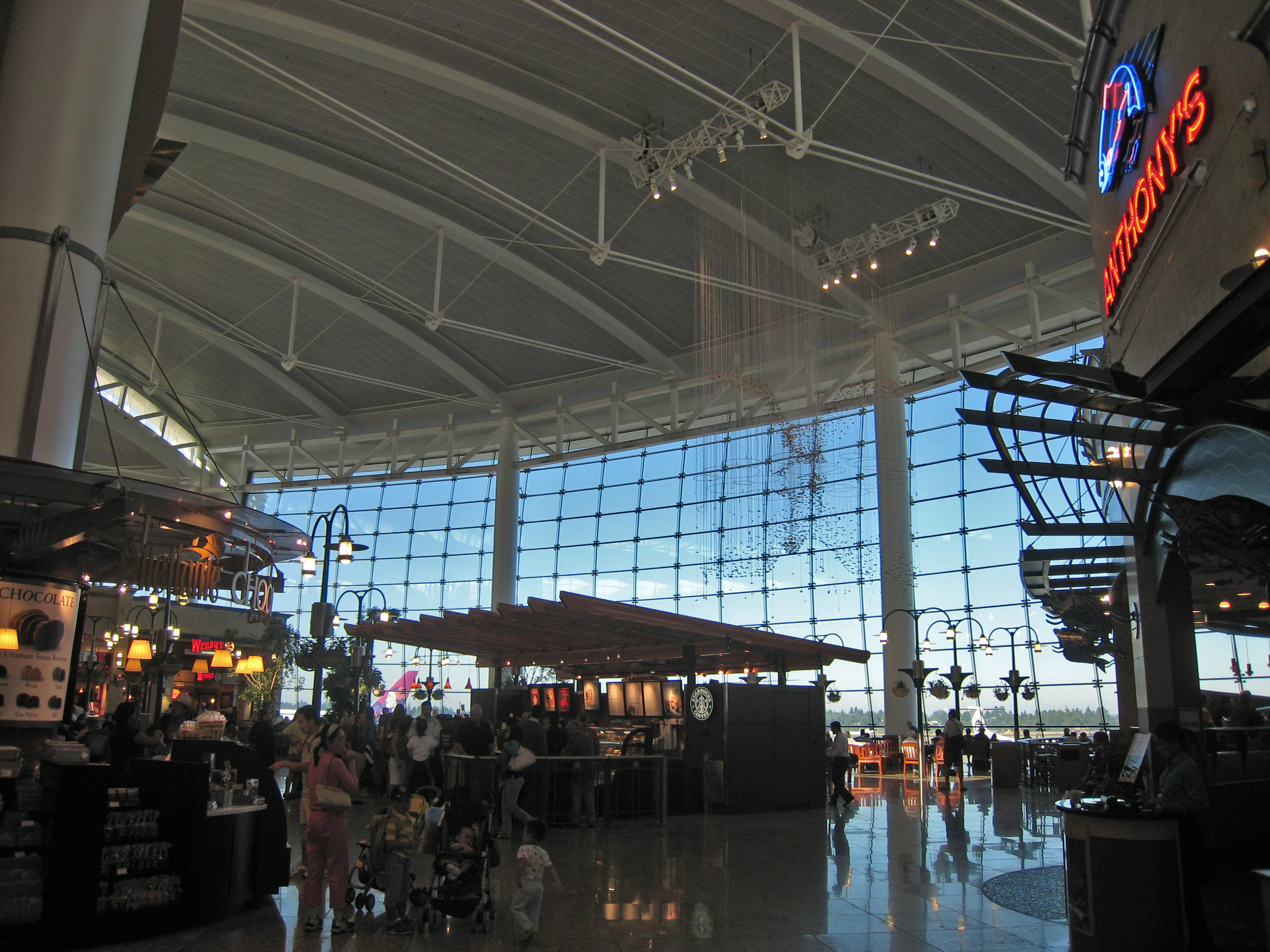
Central terminal with views of the runways

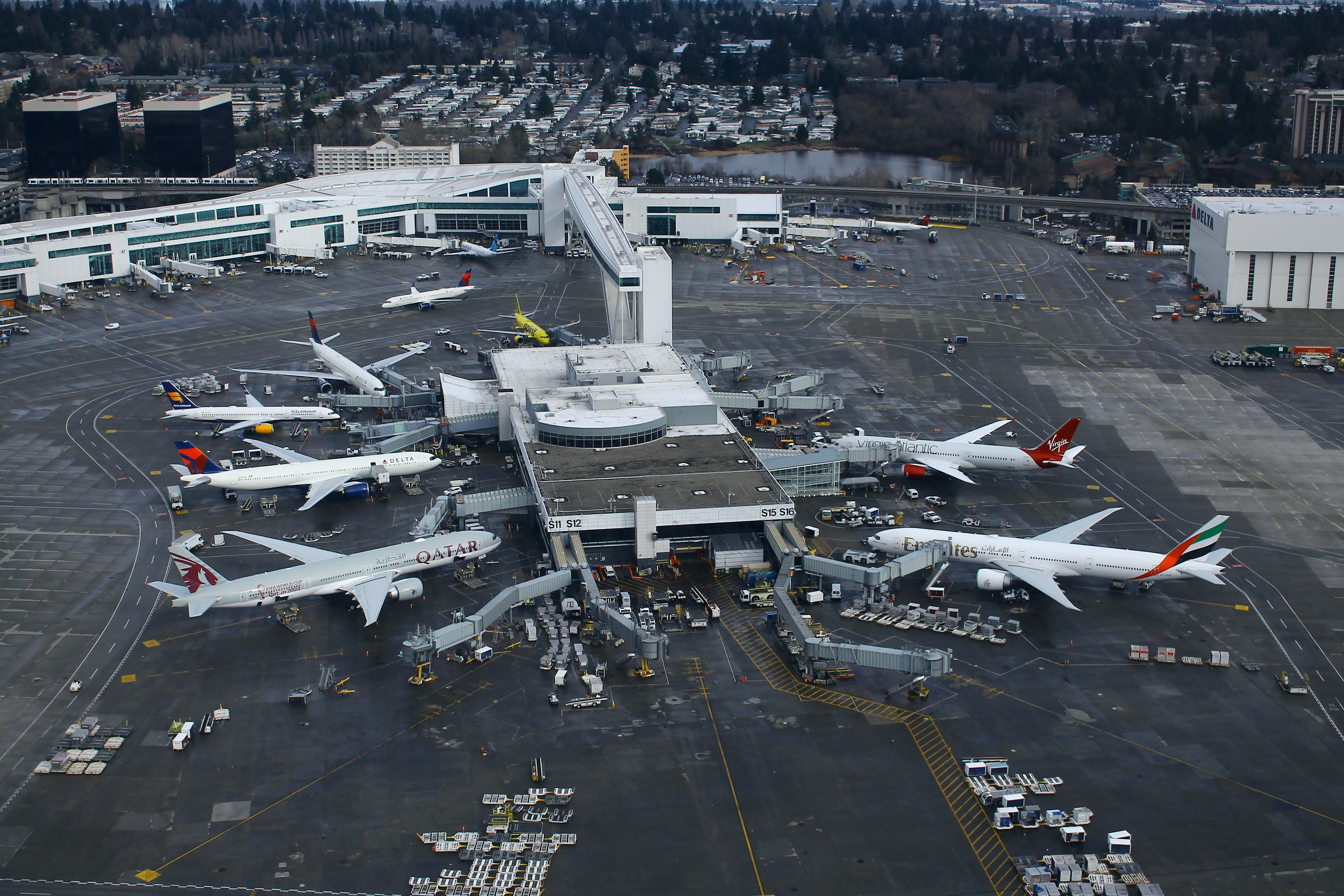
South Satellite, with a pedestrian bridge over the ramp connecting the international arrivals facility

As of July 2024, the airport has 89 gates in four concourses and two satellite buildings. The two satellite terminal buildings, named the North and South Satellites, are connected to the four concourses in the main terminal by a three-line automated people mover system called the SEA Underground. The underground transit system moves passengers within the four concourses of the central terminal and out to the two satellite terminals.

All non-precleared international arrivals arrive at the South Satellite or Concourse A, regardless of their departure terminal. A dedicated international arrivals facility with customs control is on the southeast side of the terminal building and connected to the South Satellite via an overhead walkway and to the Concourse A gates via sterile walkways. The overhead bridge from the South Satellite is 780 feet (240 m) long and rises 87 feet (27 m) over a taxiway.

- Concourse A has 16 gates, and is used by Delta Air Lines, and other domestic and foreign carriers.
- Concourse B has 17 gates, and is used by Delta Air Lines, United Airlines and Southwest Airlines.
- Concourse C has 21 gates, and is used exclusively by Alaska Airlines.
- Concourse D has 10 gates and an annex with 6 gates for bus boarded gates, and is used by Alaska Airlines, American Airlines and other domestic airlines.
- North Satellite has 20 gates, and is used exclusively by Alaska Airlines.
- South Satellite has 15 gates, and is used by domestic and foreign carriers, and primarily international flights.

The six security checkpoints at Sea–Tac are located in the main terminal and are managed by the Transportation Security Administration (TSA). All of the checkpoints offer Clear Secure prescreening, while TSA Precheck is available from two. The airport began using a virtual queuing program, called SEA Spot Saver, in 2021 to reduce wait times and control crowds at security lines. Wait times at the TSA checkpoints during peak departure periods averaged 20 minutes in 2019 and increased during the COVID-19 pandemic, with a maximum of 90 minutes reached in June 2023. During particularly busy periods, the queues for security have backed up into the airport's main parking garage and caused several hours of delays for passengers.

The Port of Seattle maintains and curates a collection of public artwork at Sea–Tac that began with acquisitions in 1968 and was formalized with a percent for art ordinance passed in 2000. The airport's art collection comprises 289 works, which includes paintings, murals, stained glass pieces, video art, and sculptures, and is valued at $40 million. Among the pieces is a replica of the Rutan Voyager that is suspended above the south end of the baggage claim area. A live music program began as a one-year pilot in 2013 with 20 musicians who performed for 780 total hours. It was expanded into a permanent airport fixture the following year during daytime hours and was temporarily replaced by a video wall during the COVID-19 pandemic in 2021.

=== Airfield ===
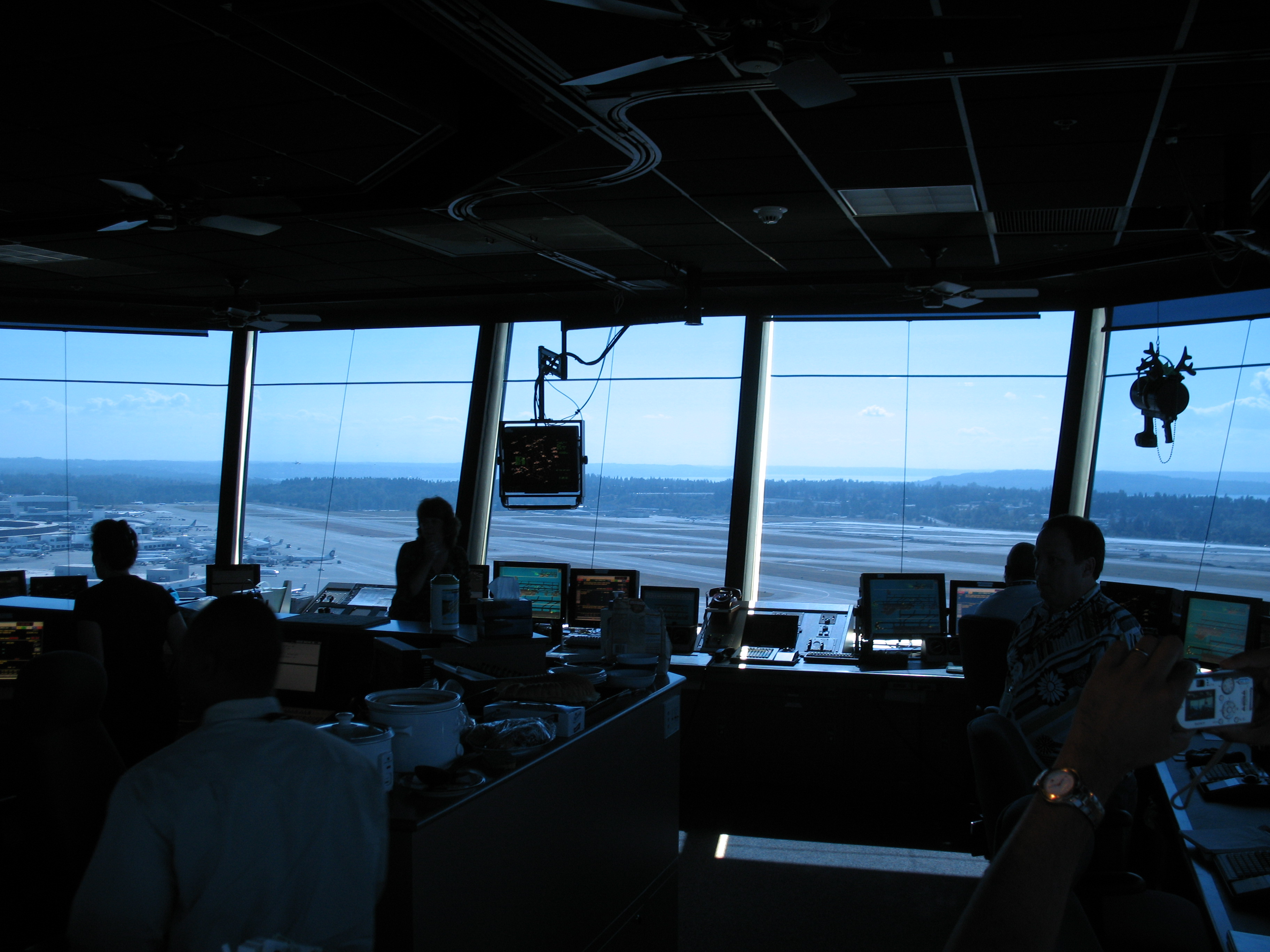
The interior of SEA Airport's control tower, commissioned in 2004, is 850 ft^{2} (79 m^{2}). At the center is a radar display; at the top right is the light gun.

The three parallel runways run nearly north–south, west of the passenger terminal, and are 8,500 to 11,900 feet (2,600–3,600 m) long. In calendar year 2023, the airport had 422,508 aircraft operations, or 1,158 per day: 99% commercial, <1% air taxi, <1% general aviation, and <1% military.

A new control tower was built beginning in 2001 and opened in November 2004, at the cost of $26 million. The floor of the new tower's control cab is 233 ft (71 m) above ground level; the tower's overall height including antennas is 269 ft (82 m). The cab has 850 sq ft (79 m^{2}) of space and was designed to support operation by ten controllers, with possible future expansion up to 15. The site and construction method of the tower were designed to maximize the visibility and efficacy of radar systems. The airport's original control tower, built in the 1950s, is now part of the passenger terminal and used as a ramp control tower after being repaired from damage caused by the 2001 Nisqually earthquake.

A recurring problem at the airport is the misidentification of the westernmost taxiway, Taxiway Tango, as a runway. A large "X" has been placed on the north end of the taxiway, but many aircraft have landed on the taxiway. The FAA issued an alert notice dated from August 27, 2009, to September 24, 2009, urging airplanes about taking precautions such as REILs and other visual cues while landing from the north.

In 2007, the airport became the first to implement an avian radar system providing 24-hour monitoring of wildlife activity across the airfield. This pilot program, designed and implemented with the assistance of the University of Illinois Center of Excellence for Airport Technology (CEAT), was intended to decrease potentially fatal incidents involving collisions with birds and to provide a test bed for the implementation of the technology in the United States, which was expected to begin in 2009. The technology is part of a strategy to reduce the presence of wildlife on the airfield.

=== Other facilities ===
The Seattle office of the National Weather Service (NWS) operates a weather station at the airport, with a temperature gauge between the center and eastern runways. The airport has served as Seattle's official weather recording location since 1945.

As of April 2023, Sea-Tac has over 23,000 total workers, including 400 to 500 customs agents and 850 TSA security officers. The airport has 3,800 cameras that are monitored from a control center staffed by Port of Seattle Airport Operations personnel. A separate control center monitors the baggage handling system at Sea-Tac, which includes 10 miles (16 km) of conveyor belts and handled 14.5 million pieces in 2022. Sea-Tac is the first major airport in the U.S. to use filters to remove per- and polyfluoroalkyl substances from its firefighting foam, which had sickened firefighters and workers.

== Ground transportation ==
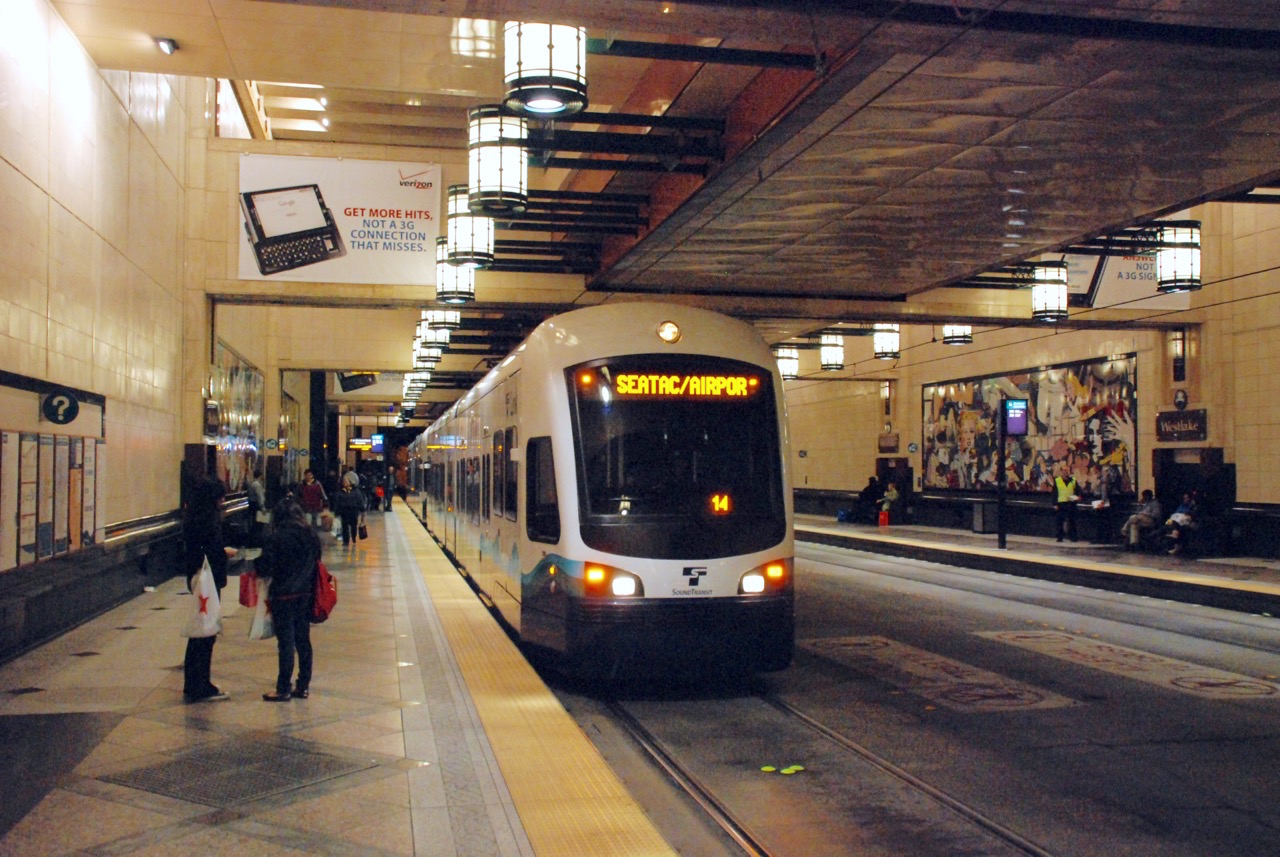
An airport-bound Link light rail train in the Downtown Seattle Transit Tunnel

The airport site was chosen partly due to its location along State Route 99, approximately midway between Seattle and Tacoma. Interstate 5 and Interstate 405 also converge near the airport, with an easy connection to the airport via State Route 518 and the Airport Expressway. State Route 509 runs west of the airport, connecting the area to West Seattle. The airport is the largest generator of vehicle trips in the state.

The Port of Seattle offers paid on-site parking in a 12,100-space garage, notable for being North America's largest parking structure under one roof. The airport also offers valet parking and electric vehicle charging stations. Several privately owned parking facilities are located off-site near the airport with shuttle access.

The airport is served by the 1 Line of Sound Transit's Link light rail system at the SeaTac/Airport station with frequent northbound service to Lynnwood City Center station via downtown Seattle and the University of Washington, while southbound service extends to Federal Way Downtown station. The airport station opened on December 19, 2009, with a mezzanine-level pedestrian bridge connection to the airport terminal via the airport parking garage level 4 walkway. Approximately 7 percent of airport travelers arrive using light rail trains. A shuttle cart between the station and the terminal has been operated by the Port of Seattle since 2016 as part of an access improvement program. Another mezzanine-level pedestrian bridge over International Boulevard provides access to the city of SeaTac, a pick-up/drop-off area, nearby airport hotels, and King County Metro buses including RapidRide A Line.

The airport is also served both by the King County Metro bus system and Sound Transit regional express buses. Sound Transit buses offer service to West Seattle, White Center, Burien, Renton, Newcastle and Bellevue through Route 560. A night bus from Lakewood and Tacoma to Downtown Seattle serves the airport during hours without Link service.

Tukwila Station, which is approximately 5 miles east of the airport, is served by Sounder commuter rail and Amtrak Cascades regional inter-city rail with service north to Vancouver, Canada, and service south to Portland and Eugene in Oregon. This station can be reached in about 30 minutes via the Central Link light rail or the RapidRide A Line bus service and transferring at Tukwila International Boulevard station to the RapidRide F Line bus service.

The airport serves door-to-door shuttle services (Shuttle Express and Speedi Shuttle) and several scheduled airporter bus services. Airporters include Bellair Charters to Yakima and Bellingham, and the Quick Shuttle to downtown Vancouver, Canada, through Quick Shuttle, with other pick-up stops at downtown Seattle, Bellingham International Airport, and drop-off stops just inside the Canadian–U.S. boundary and at the Vancouver International Airport.

Taxis, limousines, and transportation network companies (Lyft, Uber and Wingz) are also available. Prior to 2019, the Port of Seattle contracted out taxi services to an independent company, but changed to direct management with drivers due to protests over high access fees. As of 2023, the airport has 409 taxi drivers who are part of the Teamsters Local 117 labor union.

A 23-acre (9.3 ha) consolidated rental car facility opened on May 17, 2012. The facility is at the northeastern portion of the airport at the intersection of South 160th Street and International Boulevard South. The facility has 5,400 parking spaces and can handle up to 14,000 transactions per day. After the opening of the facility, 3,200 parking spaces in the central parking structure opened for general use. Passengers reach the facility on a five-minute trip aboard one of 29 low-floor Gillig CNG buses. Previously, only Alamo, Avis, Sixt, Budget, Hertz and National had cars on site. Advantage, Dollar, Enterprise, Thrifty, EZ Rent-A-Car and Fox Rent A Car ran shuttles to off-site locations. As of 2012, Rent-a-Wreck was the last remaining company to not relocate to the consolidated facility and continue using their own shuttles.

== Airlines and destinations ==
=== Passenger ===
Airlines	Destinations
Aer Lingus	Seasonal: Dublin
Aeroméxico	Mexico City–Benito Juárez; Seasonal: Guadalajara
Air Canada	Toronto–Pearson
Air Canada Express	Vancouver
Air France	Paris–Charles de Gaulle
Alaska Airlines	Albuquerque, Anchorage, Atlanta, Austin, Baltimore, Bellingham, Billings, Boise, Boston, Bozeman, Burbank, Calgary, Charleston (SC), Charlotte (begins June 10, 2027), Chicago–O'Hare, Cincinnati, Cleveland, Columbus–Glenn, Dallas/Fort Worth, Denver, Des Moines (begins June 24, 2027), Detroit, Edmonton, El Paso, Eugene, Eureka, Fairbanks, Fort Lauderdale, Fresno, Glacier Park/Kalispell, Great Falls, Helena, Honolulu, Houston–Intercontinental, Idaho Falls, Indianapolis, Jackson Hole, Jacksonville (FL) (begins June 24, 2027), Juneau, Kahului, Kailua-Kona, Kansas City, Kelowna, Ketchikan, Las Vegas, Lihue, London–Heathrow, Long Beach, Los Angeles, Medford, Miami, Milwaukee, Minneapolis/Saint Paul, Missoula, Monterey, Nashville, New Orleans, New York–JFK, Newark, Norfolk (begins June 10, 2027), Oakland, Oklahoma City, Omaha, Ontario, Orange County, Orlando, Palm Springs, Philadelphia, Phoenix–Sky Harbor, Pittsburgh, Portland (OR), Puerto Vallarta, Pullman, Raleigh/Durham, Redding, Redmond/Bend, Reno/Tahoe, Sacramento, St. Louis, Salt Lake City, San Antonio, San Diego, San Francisco, San Jose (CA), San José del Cabo, San Luis Obispo, Santa Barbara, Santa Rosa, Seoul–Incheon, Spokane, Sun Valley, Tampa, Tokyo–Narita, Toronto–Pearson, Tri-Cities (WA), Tucson, Tulsa, Vancouver, Victoria, Walla Walla, Washington–Dulles, Washington–National, Wenatchee, Wichita, Yakima; Seasonal: Athens (begins May 12, 2027), Belize City, Cancún, Eagle/Vail, Fort Myers, Guadalajara (begins March 18, 2027), Hayden/Steamboat Springs, Liberia (CR), Paris–Charles de Gaulle (begins May 25, 2027), Reykjavík–Keflavík, Rome–Fiumicino, Sitka
All Nippon Airways	Tokyo–Haneda
American Airlines	Charlotte, Chicago–O'Hare, Dallas/Fort Worth, Miami, New York–JFK (resumes April 6, 2027), Philadelphia; Seasonal: Phoenix–Sky Harbor
American Eagle	Los Angeles, Phoenix–Sky Harbor
British Airways	London–Heathrow
Cathay Pacific	Hong Kong
China Airlines	Taipei–Taoyuan
Condor	Frankfurt
Delta Air Lines	Amsterdam, Anchorage, Atlanta, Austin, Boston, Cancún, Chicago–O'Hare, Cincinnati, Dallas/Fort Worth, Denver, Detroit, Fairbanks, Fort Lauderdale, Honolulu, Kahului, Kailua-Kona, Kansas City, Las Vegas, Lihue, London–Heathrow, Los Angeles, Miami, Minneapolis/Saint Paul, Nashville, New York–JFK, Orange County, Orlando, Paris–Charles de Gaulle, Phoenix–Sky Harbor, Portland (OR), Puerto Vallarta, Raleigh/Durham, Salt Lake City, San Diego, San Francisco, San José del Cabo, Seoul–Incheon, Shanghai–Pudong, Spokane, Taipei–Taoyuan, Tampa, Tokyo–Haneda, Tokyo–Narita (resumes March 27, 2027), Washington–Dulles, Washington–National; Seasonal: Barcelona, Juneau, Palm Springs, Philadelphia (ends November 30, 2026), Rome–Fiumicino
Delta Connection	Boise, Bozeman, Denver, Eugene, Lewiston, Medford, Ontario, Orange County, Portland (OR), Redmond/Bend, Sacramento, San Francisco, San Jose (CA), Spokane, Tri-Cities (WA), Tucson, Vancouver; Seasonal: Albuquerque, Sun Valley
Discover Airlines	Frankfurt (begins March 28, 2027), Munich (begins April 7, 2027)
Emirates	Dubai–International
EVA Air	Taipei–Taoyuan
Finnair	Seasonal: Helsinki
Frontier Airlines	Dallas/Fort Worth, Denver, Las Vegas, Los Angeles, Ontario, Phoenix–Sky Harbor, Salt Lake City
Hainan Airlines	Beijing–Capital, Chongqing, Haikou
Hawaiian Airlines	Honolulu, Kahului, Osaka–Kansai (begins May 14, 2027), Papeete (begins June 11, 2027)
Icelandair	Reykjavík–Keflavík
Japan Airlines	Tokyo–Narita
JetBlue	Seasonal: Boston, New York–JFK
Korean Air	Seoul–Incheon
Lufthansa	Frankfurt, Munich
Philippine Airlines	Manila
Qatar Airways	Doha
Scandinavian Airlines	Seasonal: Copenhagen
Singapore Airlines	Singapore
Southwest Airlines	Austin, Chicago–Midway, Denver, Las Vegas, Long Beach, Oakland, Phoenix–Sky Harbor, Sacramento, San Diego, San Jose (CA); Seasonal: Baltimore, Dallas–Love, Houston–Hobby, Kansas City, Nashville, St. Louis
Starlux Airlines	Taipei–Taoyuan
Sun Country Airlines	Minneapolis/Saint Paul
Turkish Airlines	Istanbul
United Airlines	Chicago–O'Hare, Denver, Houston–Intercontinental, Los Angeles, Newark, San Francisco, Washington–Dulles
Virgin Atlantic	London–Heathrow
Volaris	Guadalajara
WestJet	Calgary
WestJet Encore	Calgary; Seasonal: Kelowna

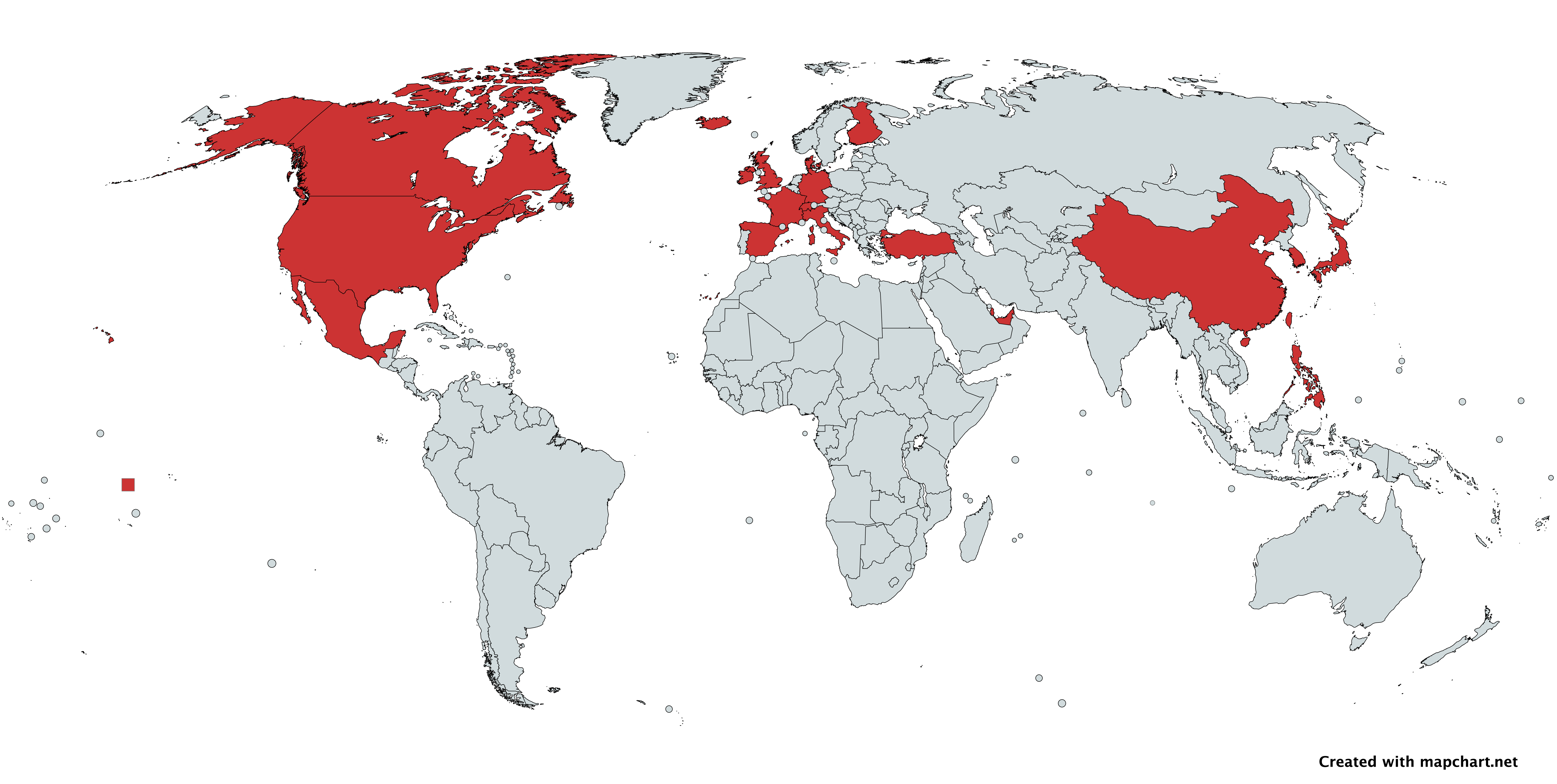
Seattle–Tacoma International Airport passenger destinations

=== Destinations map ===
Continental United States Destinations (See Washington State Below)
Continental U.S. destinations from Seattle/Tacoma International Airport
Red = Year-round destination
Green = Seasonal destination
Blue = Future destination
Washington State Destinations map
Destinations from Seattle/Tacoma International Airport
Alaska and Hawaii destinations
Alaska destinations from Seattle/Tacoma International Airport
Green = Seasonal destination
Hawaii destinations from Seattle/Tacoma International Airport
Red = Year-round destination
North American international destinations
North American international destinations from Seattle/Tacoma International Airport
Red = Year-round destination
Green = Seasonal destination
Asia and Europe destinations
Asia destinations from Seattle/Tacoma International Airport
Red = Year-round destination
Blue = Future destination
Europe destinations from Seattle/Tacoma International Airport
Red = Year-round destination
Green = Seasonal destination
Blue = Future destination

=== Cargo ===
Airlines	Destinations	Refs.
AeroLogic	Frankfurt	
AirZeta	Seoul–Incheon	
Alaska Air Cargo	Anchorage, Cordova, Juneau, Ketchikan, Los Angeles, Petersburg, Sitka, Wrangell, Yakutat	
Aloha Air Cargo	Honolulu, Los Angeles	
Amazon Air	Anchorage, Cincinnati	
Ameriflight	Moses Lake, Spokane	
Cargolux	Calgary, Glasgow–Prestwick, Los Angeles, Luxembourg	
China Airlines Cargo	Taipei–Taoyuan	
DHL Aviation	Cincinnati, Los Angeles	
EVA Air Cargo	Anchorage, Dallas/Fort Worth, Taipei–Taoyuan	
FedEx Express	Indianapolis, Los Angeles, Memphis, Oakland, Portland (OR)	
FedEx Feeder	Bellingham, Burlington/Mount Vernon, Friday Harbor, Orcas Island, Port Angeles	
Korean Air Cargo	Chicago–O'Hare, Los Angeles, Seoul–Incheon	
Northern Air Cargo	Anchorage	

== Statistics ==
=== Top destinations ===
Busiest domestic routes from SEA (September 2025 – August 2026)
Rank	City	Passengers	Carriers
1	Los Angeles, California	908,409	Alaska, American, Delta, Frontier, United
2	Denver, Colorado	902,389	Alaska, Delta, Frontier, Southwest, United
3	Phoenix–Sky Harbor, Arizona	898,948	Alaska, American, Delta, Frontier, Southwest
4	Anchorage, Alaska	843,222	Alaska, Delta, Hawaiian
5	San Francisco, California	816,232	Alaska, Delta, United
6	Chicago–O'Hare, Illinois	808,033	Alaska, American, Delta, United
7	Las Vegas, Nevada	788,894	Alaska, Delta, Frontier, Southwest, Spirit
8	Dallas/Fort Worth, Texas	783,137	Alaska, American, Delta
9	San Diego, California	620,869	Alaska, Delta, Southwest
10	Salt Lake City, Utah	547,746	Alaska, Delta, Frontier

Busiest international routes from SEA (September 2025 – August 2026)
Rank	City	Passengers	Carriers
1	Taipei–Taoyuan, Taiwan	768,691	China Airlines, Delta, EVA Air, Starlux Airlines
2	Seoul–Incheon, South Korea	637,354	Alaska, Asiana Airlines, Delta, Hawaiian, Korean Air
3	Vancouver, Canada	629,324	Air Canada, Alaska, Delta
4	London–Heathrow, United Kingdom	576,229	British Airways, Delta, Virgin Atlantic
5	Tokyo–Haneda, Japan	326,278	All Nippon Airways, Delta
6	Tokyo–Narita, Japan	288,469	Alaska, Hawaiian, Japan Airlines
7	Amsterdam, Netherlands	278,289	Delta
8	Paris–Charles de Gaulle, France	254,605	Air France, Delta
9	Calgary, Canada	210,102	Alaska, Westjet
10	San José del Cabo, Mexico	198,431	Alaska, Delta

=== Airline market share ===
Top airlines at SEA (September 2025 – August 2026)
Rank	Airline	Passengers	Share
1	Alaska Airlines	25,750,716	51.1%
2	Delta Air Lines	12,401,867	24.6%
3	United Airlines	2,618,211	5.2%
4	American Airlines	2,390,393	4.7%
5	Southwest Airlines	2,188,915	4.3%
—	Other Airlines	5,100,000	10.1%

=== Annual traffic at SEA ===
SEA Airport Annual Passenger Data 2011–Present
Year	Passengers	% Change
2011	32,823,220	—
2012	33,223,111	▲1.22%
2013	34,826,741	▲4.83%
2014	37,498,267	▲7.67%
2015	42,340,537	▲12.91%
2016	45,737,115	▲8.02%
2017	46,934,619	▲2.62%
2018	49,849,520	▲6.21%
2019	51,829,239	▲3.97%
2020	20,061,507	▼61.29%
2021	36,154,015	▲80.36%
2022	45,964,321	▲27.13%
2023	50,877,260	▲10.69%
2024	52,640,716	▲3.45%
2025	52,715,181	▲0.08%

== Accidents and incidents ==
- November 30, 1947: Alaska Airlines Flight 9, a Douglas C-54A en route to Seattle from Anchorage, Alaska, caught fire after overshooting the runway upon landing in heavy fog and damp conditions following failed attempts at nearby Boeing Field and Paine Field in Everett. Shortly before 2:30 p.m. on Sunday, the plane touched down 2,748 ft (838 m) beyond the approach area to runway 20 and sped onto a nearby road, colliding with a car and bursting into flames. Nine fatalities resulted from the accident, including a blind woman riding in the automobile.
- April 2, 1956: Northwest Orient Airlines Flight 2, a Boeing 377 Stratocruiser headed to Portland International Airport in Portland, Oregon and points east, experienced reduced power and extreme buffeting shortly after takeoff from runway 20 due to an improper setting of the airplane's cowl flaps by the flight engineer. Plans were initially made to land at McChord Air Force Base, but the pilot was forced to make a water landing in Puget Sound east of Maury Island. The plane sank within 15 minutes; five of the 38 on board died.
- November 24, 1971: Northwest Airlines Flight 305, a Boeing 727 flying to SEA Airport from Portland International Airport, was hijacked by a man calling himself "Dan Cooper," later misidentified by the press as "D. B. Cooper". Cooper released the passengers and attendants after landing in exchange for $200,000 and four parachutes, ordered the plane back into the air and jumped out over Southwest Washington with the money. To this day, neither Cooper nor most of the $200,000 have been found.
- December 26, 1974: Harbor Airlines Flight 308, a Britten Norman Islander bound for Oak Harbor crashed 0.6 miles (1 km) north of SEA Airport in snowy weather conditions into Riverton. Four of the six occupants on board (3 passengers, 1 crew) were killed. Unknown matter in the pitot tubes caused improper readings of the airspeed indicator.
- January 20, 1983: Northwest Airlines Flight 608, a Boeing 727 flying from SEA Airport to Portland, was hijacked. The man told a flight attendant that he had a bomb and demanded to be taken to Afghanistan. Federal agents stormed the plane after it landed in Portland for refueling. The hijacker was killed and the box he carried revealed no explosives.
- April 15, 1988: Horizon Air Flight 2658, a twin-engine de Havilland Canada Dash-8 departing for Spokane International Airport, experienced a power loss in the number two engine shortly after takeoff. While the crew lowered the gear for landing as they returned to the airport, a massive fire broke out in the right engine nacelle, resulting in a loss of braking and directional control. After touchdown, the aircraft veered off the runway and crossed the ramp, colliding with two jetways before coming to a stop against a third. The aircraft was destroyed by fire on impact. Four of the 37 passengers were seriously injured, but there were no fatalities.
- August 10, 2018: An empty Horizon Air Bombardier Q400 was stolen by a staff member and ultimately crashed on Ketron Island. Two US Air Force F-15s tried to force the plane to land.
