= Bow Lake (SeaTac, Washington) =

Lake in SeaTac, Washington

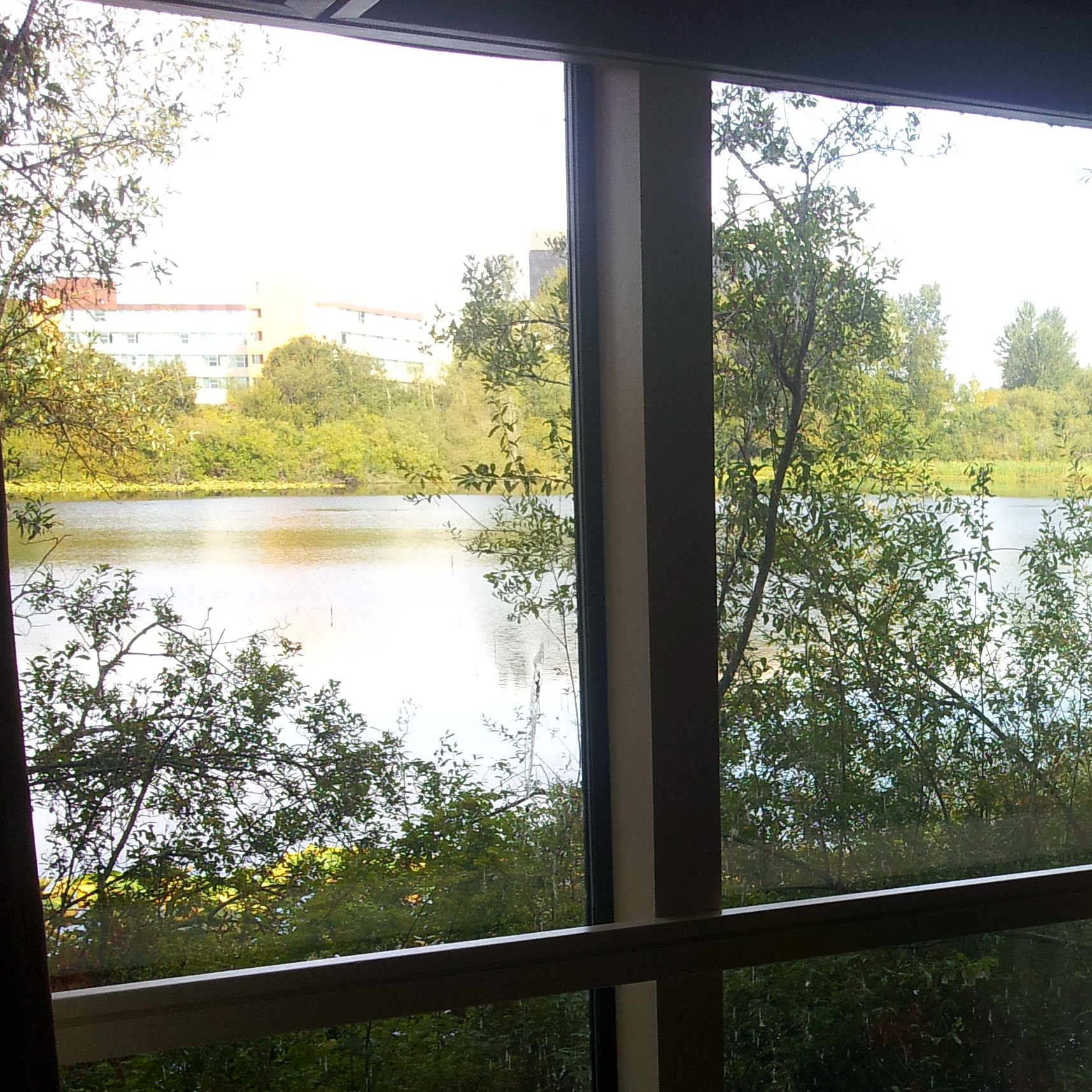
- Bow Lake as seen from an adjacent hotel

- Location within Washington (state) Location within the United States
- Location: SeaTac, Washington, US
- Coordinates: 47°26′19″N 122°17′35″W
- Basin countries: United States
- Surface elevation: 335 ft (102 m)

Bow Lake is a small lake in SeaTac, Washington, United States. It is located next to Seattle–Tacoma International Airport, just across Route 99. The lake has played a key role in the airport's history, and the airport was originally named for it. Due to rapid urbanization and alteration of the lake's watershed, water quality has deteriorated significantly. A major drinking water pipeline runs near the lake.

== Geography ==
Bow Lake is one of several small lakes in the region, including Lake Burien and Angle Lake. These lakes formed as glaciers retreated during the Last Ice Age, and are spring-fed. Native Americans used these lakes for fishing and hunting waterfowl.

Before the airport was built, the area around the lake was largely rural. It is now heavily urbanized, and is surrounded by airport hotels and a retirement community.

== Seattle–Tacoma International Airport ==
Seattle–Tacoma International Airport was built in the early 1940s, in response to the attack on Pearl Harbor and the entrance of the United States into World War II. A site for SeaTac airport near Lake Sammamish was initially preferred., but the nearby Cascade Range posed safety issues. At that time, Bow Lake was located in an undeveloped area, with only a small private airfield. Monetary incentives from Tacoma and Pierce County ultimately helped sway the decision, despite warnings of heavy fog at the site. This included a $100,000 contribution from the city of Tacoma.

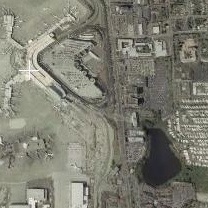
Aerial view of Bow Lake and Seattle–Tacoma International Airport

== Pollution ==
In 1997, King County, the Port of Seattle, the city of SeaTac and the city of Des Moines conducted an extensive study of Des Moines Creek and its watershed, which includes Bow Lake. It found that Bow Lake has very poor water quality, polluting Des Moines Creek downstream. Nutrient concentrations are high, leading to toxic algal blooms. This causes dissolved oxygen levels to decline significantly, which is harmful to aquatic ecosystems. Fecal coliform levels are high. Development near the airport has led to a large impervious area that drains into the lake, harming its water quality.

Pumpkinseed sunfish and largemouth bass have been found in the lake.

== Bow Lake Pipeline ==
Before the 1950s, there were three pipelines that brought drinking water to Seattle from the Cedar River watershed and Lake Youngs. The fourth pipeline, known as Cedar River Pipeline Number Four or the Bow Lake Pipeline was built to provide a direct supply of water from Lake Youngs to the area near the airport. Previously, water was pumped into a reservoir (not Bow Lake itself) from West Seattle, which was straining the water system there. The new pipeline entered service in 1954, and supplies the airport area and West Seattle.

== Bow Lake Recycling and Transfer Station ==
King County's largest recycling transfer station is located near Bow Lake, next to Interstate 5. The station sorts incoming recyclable materials for reprocessing, and sends waste to the Cedar Hills Regional Landfill.
