= Lake Youngs =

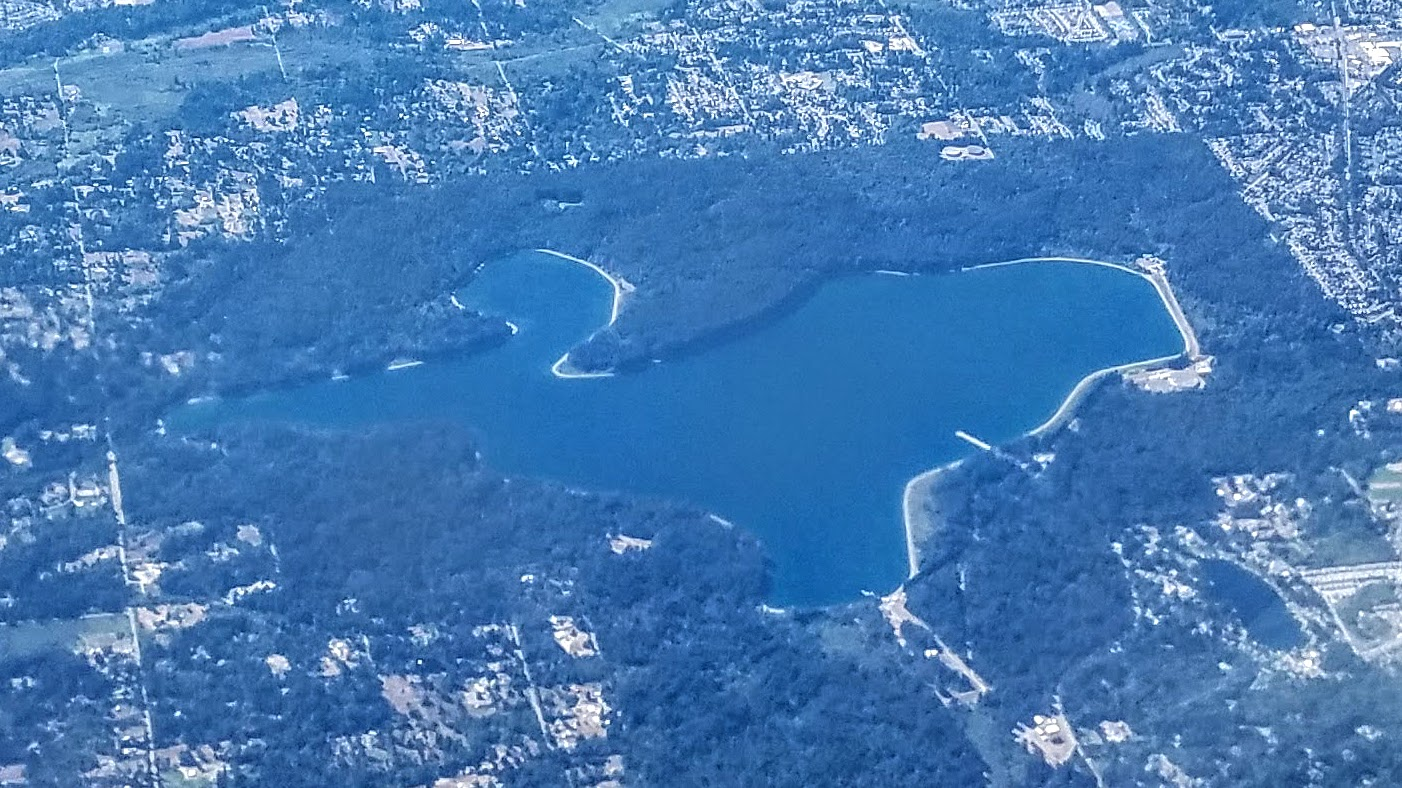

- Location within Washington (state) Location within the United States
- Location: King County, Washington
- Coordinates: 47°25′11″N 122°7′27″W
- Type: reservoir
- Basin countries: United States
- Surface area: 700 acres (280 ha)
- Max. depth: 72 ft (22 m)
- Surface elevation: 502 ft (153 m)

Lake Youngs is a reservoir in King County, Washington, United States. It is located between Maple Valley and Renton along the route of pipelines carrying water from the Cedar River to Seattle (the most recent of these is the Bow Lake pipeline, which was built in 1954) and is accessible only to Seattle Public Utilities staff and authorized visitors.

Originally the site of 548 acres (222 ha) Swan Lake, construction of the Lake Youngs reservoir began in earnest in the early 1920s and was completed by 1926. Lake Youngs has a surface area of 700 acres (2.8 km^{2}) and a maximum depth of 72 feet (22 m). It was named for longtime Seattle Water Department head L. B. Youngs, who died in 1923. Lake Youngs is used as a visual checkpoint for pilots flying into and out of Renton Municipal Airport.

Lake Youngs is drained by Little Soos Creek.
