= Enterprise Holdings =

Holding company of several car rental brands

Enterprise Holdings, Inc.
- Trade name: Enterprise Mobility
- Type: Private
- Industry: Travel
- Founded: 1957; 69 years ago; August 3, 2009; 16 years ago (as holding company)
- Founder: Jack C. Taylor
- Headquarters: Clayton, Missouri, United States
- Number of locations: 9,500 branches (2020)
- Key people: Andrew C. Taylor (executive chairman); Chrissy Taylor (president & CEO)
- Brands: Alamo Rent a Car; Enterprise Car Club; Enterprise Car Sales; Enterprise Rent-A-Car; National Car Rental
- Revenue: US$35 billion (2023)
- Total assets: 2.5 million vehicles (2023)
- Number of employees: 90,000 (2023)
- Website: enterprisemobility.com

Enterprise Holdings, Inc. (doing business as Enterprise Mobility) is an American private holding company headquartered in Clayton, Missouri, in Greater St. Louis. It is the parent company of car rental agencies Enterprise Rent-A-Car, National Car Rental, Alamo Rent a Car and also operates several other transportation services including commercial fleet management, used car sales (through its Enterprise Car Sales dealers), carsharing, and commercial truck rental operations.

It is one of the three big rental car holding companies in the United States, holding a 40% market share, placing it first, ahead of Hertz Global Holdings and Avis Budget Group.

== History ==
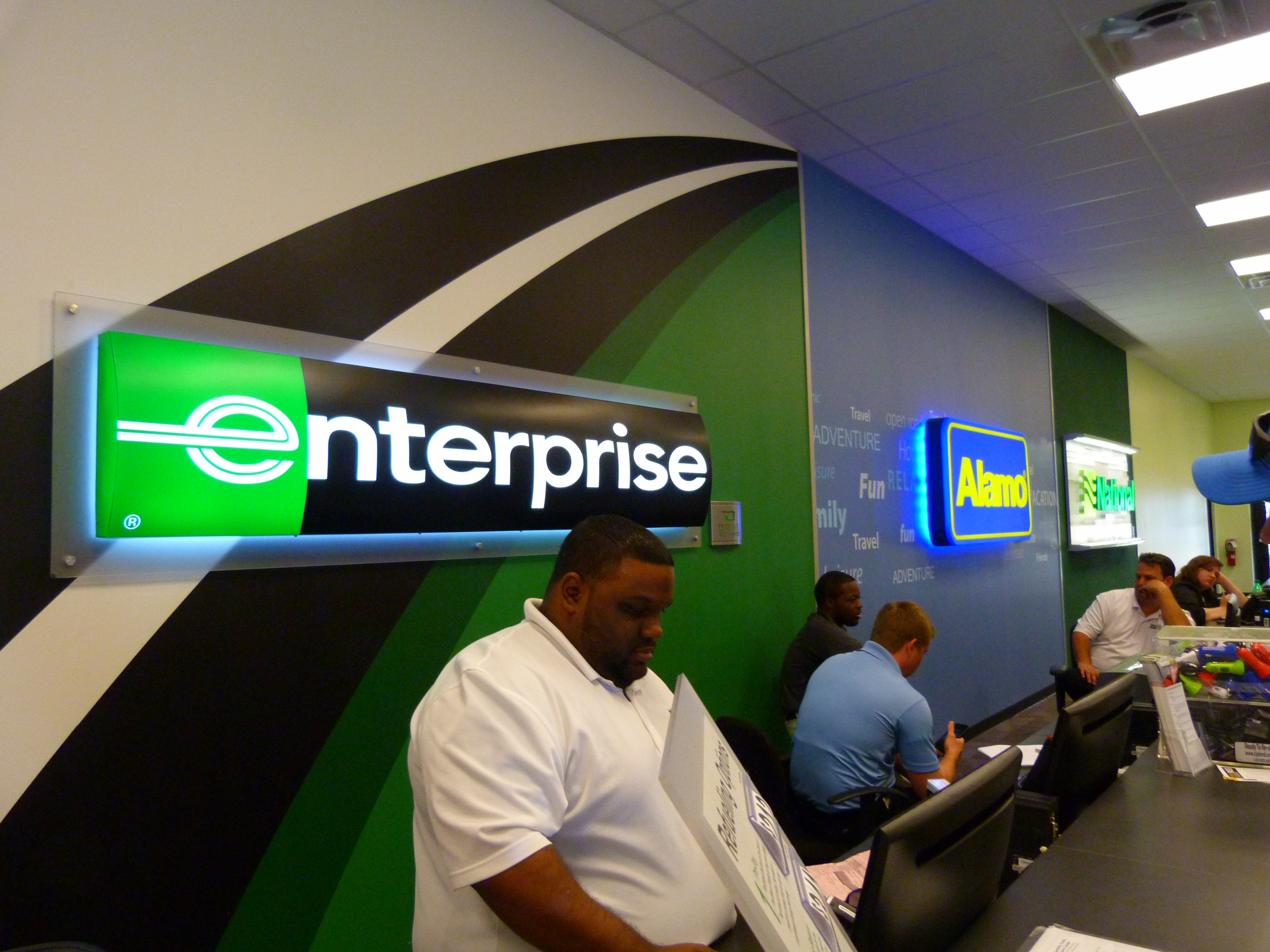
A combined Enterprise, Alamo and National car rental counter, a common sight at airports after the merger

Established in 1957 as Executive Leasing Company, the company was renamed Enterprise in 1969 in memory of the World War II ship USS Enterprise (CV-6) on which the founder Jack C. Taylor served. Jack Taylor's founding philosophy, which has shaped the company's business policy, has been stated as "Take care of your customers and employees first, and profits will follow."

Enterprise Rent-A-Car was established in St. Louis, Missouri, and the company still has its headquarters in the area and remains managed by the Taylor family. It is the largest privately owned company in the St. Louis area and one of its largest employers.

The holding company was formed on August 3, 2009, as a result of Enterprise Rent-A-Car's 2007 acquisition of Vanguard Automotive Group, the former parent company of National and Alamo. The resulting company was 21st on the 2008 Forbes list of "Largest Private Companies in America". Enterprise Holdings was 9th on the 2021 Forbes list of "Largest Private Companies in America".

As of 2010, Enterprise ranked as the largest car rental company in North America, and was the only investment-grade company in the car rental industry. Further, it was part of the largest global car rental network through its alliance with Europcar. The success of Enterprise can in part be attributed to its major focus on customer service.

=== Executive history ===
As of 2010, the company's chairman and CEO was Andrew Taylor, son of the founder Jack Taylor.

On June 4, 2013, it was announced that Pamela Nicholson would assume the role of chief executive officer. Nicholson was not only the first female CEO in the company's history, but also the first who was not a member of the Taylor family of St. Louis. Her predecessor, Andrew "Andy" Taylor, has continued to stay involved with company activities since then as Executive Chairman. In October 2019, the company announced Nicholson would retire by the end of the year. Two months later, Enterprise said Chrissy Taylor, then the company's president and chief operating officer, would be promoted to CEO, effective January 2020. Taylor is only the fourth CEO in the company's more than 60-year history and the third generation of Taylor family CEO leadership, preceded by her father Andy Taylor and grandfather Jack Taylor. She also retained her current title of president.

=== Mergers and acquisitions ===
A planned acquisition of Citer SA was announced in November 2011; this includes the acquisition of subsidiary Atesa. This acquisition would add 30,000 vehicles to the company's fleet and provide entry into the French and Spanish markets.

PhillyCarShare, a for-profit car-sharing organization in Philadelphia, Pennsylvania, was acquired by Enterprise in 2011 and was renamed Enterprise CarShare in 2014.

Enterprise acquired further car-share companies including Mint Cars-On-Demand in 2012 (New York and Boston), I-GO in 2013 (Chicago), and in 2014 Occasional Car in Denver and AutoShare in Toronto.

Enterprise acquired Performance Gateway, LLC, in 2014, which provided “Software-as-a-service (SaaS) services featuring performance management software for use in network management, vendor and employee feedback, and training, vehicle rental, automotive insurance, automotive refinishing, and collision repair applications."

Enterprise acquired Zimride ride-matching business on July 10, 2013. Terms of the sale were not released.

Triangle Rent A Car, another car-rental company based in Raleigh, North Carolina, was acquired by Enterprise in 2015 and it was converted into Enterprise Rent-a-Car.

In 2017, Enterprise merged Cyncast Inc. and Performance Gateway, LLC (both acquired by Enterprise in 2007 and 2014 respectively) into ARMS® Business Solutions (ABS) "to provide an integrated management suite to insurance carriers, adjusters, collisions repair shops, manufacturers, and all partners involved in the claims and repair channels." In October 2019, Enterprise launched Entegral, the new name for its technology platform, which "was formerly known as ARMS® Business Solutions (ABS)."

In April 2017, Enterprise acquired Dooley Car Rentals, a car rental business operating in Ireland.

In January 2019, Enterprise acquired Deem, a managed-travel technology platform that "includes Deem Work Fource and Deem Ground Work, a suite of online booking and travel technology products for business travelers, travel managers, travel-management companies and suppliers."

In September 2020, Enterprise acquired Canadian company Discount Car and Truck Rental. The company, founded in 1980, had been privately held. This added nearly 600 locations to Enterprise's network in Canada.

=== Rebranding and expansion ===
On October 26, 2023 Enterprise Holdings was officially rebranded as Enterprise Mobility.

=== Enterprise Rent-A-Car ===
In 2006, Enterprise Rent-A-Car ranked #1 in sales with $9 billion in sales; unclear what the geographical scope of this sales figure was.

Enterprise Rent-A-Car became an Enterprise Holdings subsidiary in 2009. This subsidiary has been recognized as a "Best Place to Launch a Career" by BusinessWeek for several years prior to 2010. It also has a strong culture of promoting from within, which has contributed to its being a top recruiter of college graduates. In addition, the subsidiary has been named the number one ranked car rental company in terms of customer satisfaction by J.D. Power several times.

=== Enterprise CarShare ===
In 2008, Enterprise piloted its first on-campus carsharing program at Washington University in St. Louis. The program, called WeCar, was introduced at University of South Florida in July 2009. As of September 2012, WeCar has 100 carsharing programs in more than 30 U.S. states and Canada, and the service offers almost 100 electric cars and plug-in hybrids, including the Nissan Leaf and the Chevrolet Volt. By September 2013, WeCar was rebranded as Enterprise CarShare.

In March 2014, Enterprise Holdings acquired AutoShare, a carsharing company that had been founded in Toronto in 1998 and operated in several Canadian cities. It adopted the Enterprise CarShare name soon after.

During the COVID-19 pandemic in 2020, Enterprise CarShare shut down business operations in New York and Philadelphia, retail rentals in those cities, Honolulu, and St. Louis, and suspended operations on most university campuses.

=== ONRAMP Concierge ===
In 2012, Enterprise launched a mobile concierge website accessible by scanning a QR code for smart phones. Known as "ONRAMP Concierge", the service is accessed by customers scanning the code printed on a sticker placed on the driver's side window of the vehicle; the codes were made available to nearly all vehicles in Enterprise Rent-A-Car, Alamo Rent A Car, and National Car Rental following a 20,000-vehicle pilot program started in 2011. The application, once scanned, gives users information about their rental vehicle's make and model, company offers and nearby resources such as gas stations or restaurants. Enterprise launched the application in an effort to raise vehicle awareness and generate sales for its auto manufacturing partners.

Enterprise Holdings is no longer supporting the OnRamp Concierge program. To manage and provide feedback about your current rental, you must download the Alamo, Enterprise or National mobile apps in the app store.

=== Enterprise Center ===
On May 22, 2018, it was announced that Enterprise had purchased the naming rights of the Scottrade Center, home of the St. Louis Blues. The building's name was to become the Enterprise Center, with the name change effective July 1. The arena's renovations continued their second phase during this time; all Phase 2 renovations and signage changes were complete in time for the 2018–19 NHL season.

=== Ties to Washington University in St. Louis ===
The executive chairman of Enterprise Holdings, Andrew C. Taylor, is a Washington University trustee. His father, Enterprise founder Jack C. Taylor, is a Washington University alumnus and served as a trustee and emeritus trustee. In 2001, the Washington University Enterprise Holdings Scholars Program was founded with a $25 million gift from Enterprise Holdings. In 2011, Jack C. Taylor gave Washington University in St. Louis $25 million to further fund the scholarship program.

=== ICE contract ===
In 2026, Enterprise faced criticism for contracts with United States Immigration and Customs Enforcement following the killing of Alex Pretti. Activist groups, including Action Network and an order of nuns in Los Angeles, pressured the company to discontinue business with ICE agents, and there were organized campaigns to disrupt business operations with cancelled bookings.

== Businesses ==
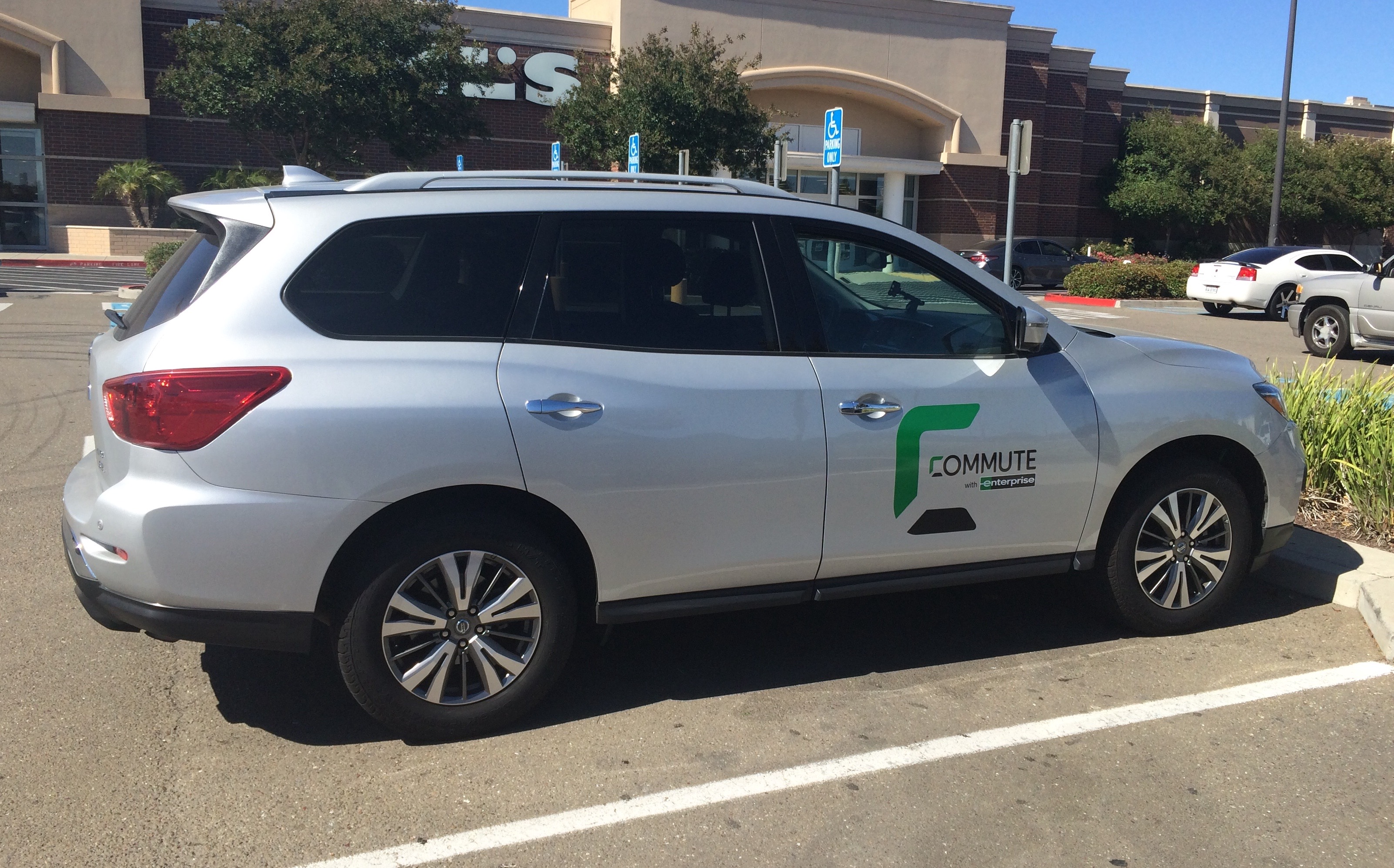
A silver Nissan Pathfinder operated by Commute with Enterprise, the largest vanpool provider in the United States.

=== Vehicle rental brands ===
Hogan transportation class eight trucking leasing company recently acquired December 2025

- Enterprise Rent-A-Car – Flagship car rental brand, focused on “home city” rentals to consumers (often people renting a car close to their home as opposed to at an airport)
- Alamo Rent A Car – Car rental brand that typically caters to budget-conscious leisure travelers
- National Car Rental – Car rental brand that typically caters to business travelers
- Enterprise Truck Rental – Consumer moving truck rentals and commercial vehicle rentals
- Enterprise Flex-E-Rent – Commercial vehicle rentals in the United Kingdom
- Enterprise CarShare – Carsharing service focused on company cars
- Enterprise Car Club – Carsharing service in the United Kingdom
- Exotic Car Collection by Enterprise – Exotic car rentals to consumers

=== Other transportation services ===
- Enterprise Car Sales – Used vehicle sales
- Commute with Enterprise – Vanpool fleet management
- Subscribe with Enterprise – Subscription based consumer vehicle leasing
- Enterprise Fleet Management (affiliate) – Fleet management for companies and government agencies
