= Enterprise Car Sales =

US-based used car retailer

- Industry: Used car sales
- Founded: 1962; 64 years ago
- Headquarters: Clayton, Missouri, United States
- Number of locations: 145 (2020)
- Area served: United States
- Key people: Andrew C. Taylor (Executive Chairman); Chrissy Taylor (President & CEO; Michael Bystrom (Vice President)
- Parent: Enterprise Holdings
- Website: enterprisecarsales.com

Enterprise Car Sales is an American used car retailer headquartered in Clayton, Missouri and is a service of the Enterprise Rent-A-Car brand, which is owned by Enterprise Holdings, one of the major car rental operators. As of 2020, the company operates over 145 dealerships in the United States. The company was established in 1962 by Enterprise Rent-A-Car founder Jack C. Taylor.

Most of the vehicles sold by the company come from Enterprise Holdings’ fleet of rental vehicles. Former rental vehicles have an above-average likelihood of wear and tear, but the company says they strictly follow the manufacturer’s maintenance schedule, and all vehicles pass a safety inspection before being sold. Enterprise also offers buyers CARFAX vehicle history reports.

The company was an early adopter of the "haggle-free" approach to pricing used cars, later used by competitor CarMax and online used car retailers like Carvana. While most small used car dealers sell vehicles "as is", Enterprise offers a 7-day/1,000-mile buyback policy, a 12-month/12,000-mile limited powertrain warranty and 12 months of roadside assistance. The company offers financing through a network of preferred lenders, as well as a private label financing program through Chase.
