= Classic Car Club =

UK carsharing scheme

Classic Car Club (London)
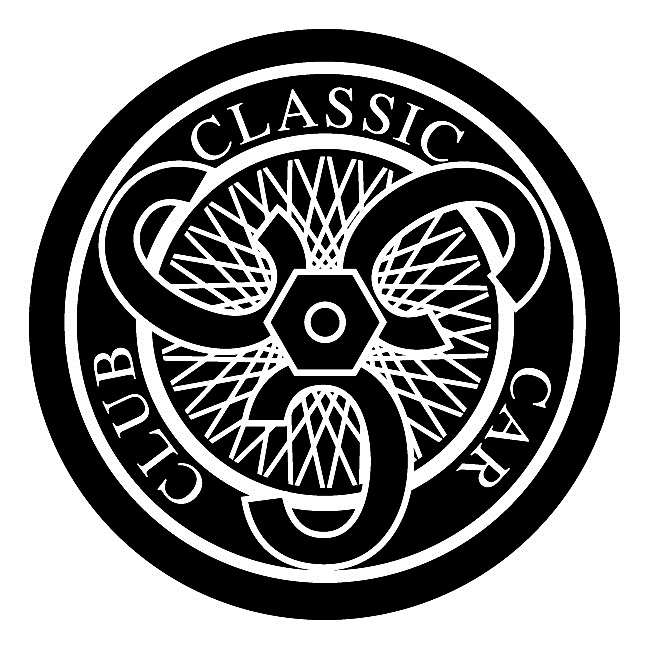
- Company type: Limited Company
- Industry: Sustainable Transport
- Founded: 1995
- Headquarters: London, United Kingdom
- Website: classiccarclub.com

Classic Car Club (London) is a carsharing scheme operated by London Classic Autos Ltd. Established in 1995, the first carsharing club of its kind in the UK with over 50 vehicles based at the club's Hoxton headquarters. Classic Car Club differs from other carsharing schemes in that the cars it provides are classic and sports cars dating from 1959 to 2015.

== Origins ==
Classic Car Club was established in 1995 by a group of enthusiast classic car owners, originally based at Kings Cross and later having premises in Islington, Old Street and finally the current Hoxton location.

=== Membership ===
Membership to Classic Car Club is not open, as it is with schemes such as City Car Club. Prospective members have to supply references and have their membership approved by the company's board. Members receive an allocation of points upon paying a yearly membership fee. These points are exchanged for time in cars. The points system is based on the type of car and peak/off-peak use. Insurance and breakdown cover is included as part of the membership. Fuel and other items like congestion charge and parking are not.

=== Financial Benefits ===
Research has shown that using carsharing clubs such as Classic Car Club can have financial benefits. According to government-sponsored website carclubs.org.uk, car owners who drive less than 6,000 miles a year can save up to £3,500

=== Cars ===
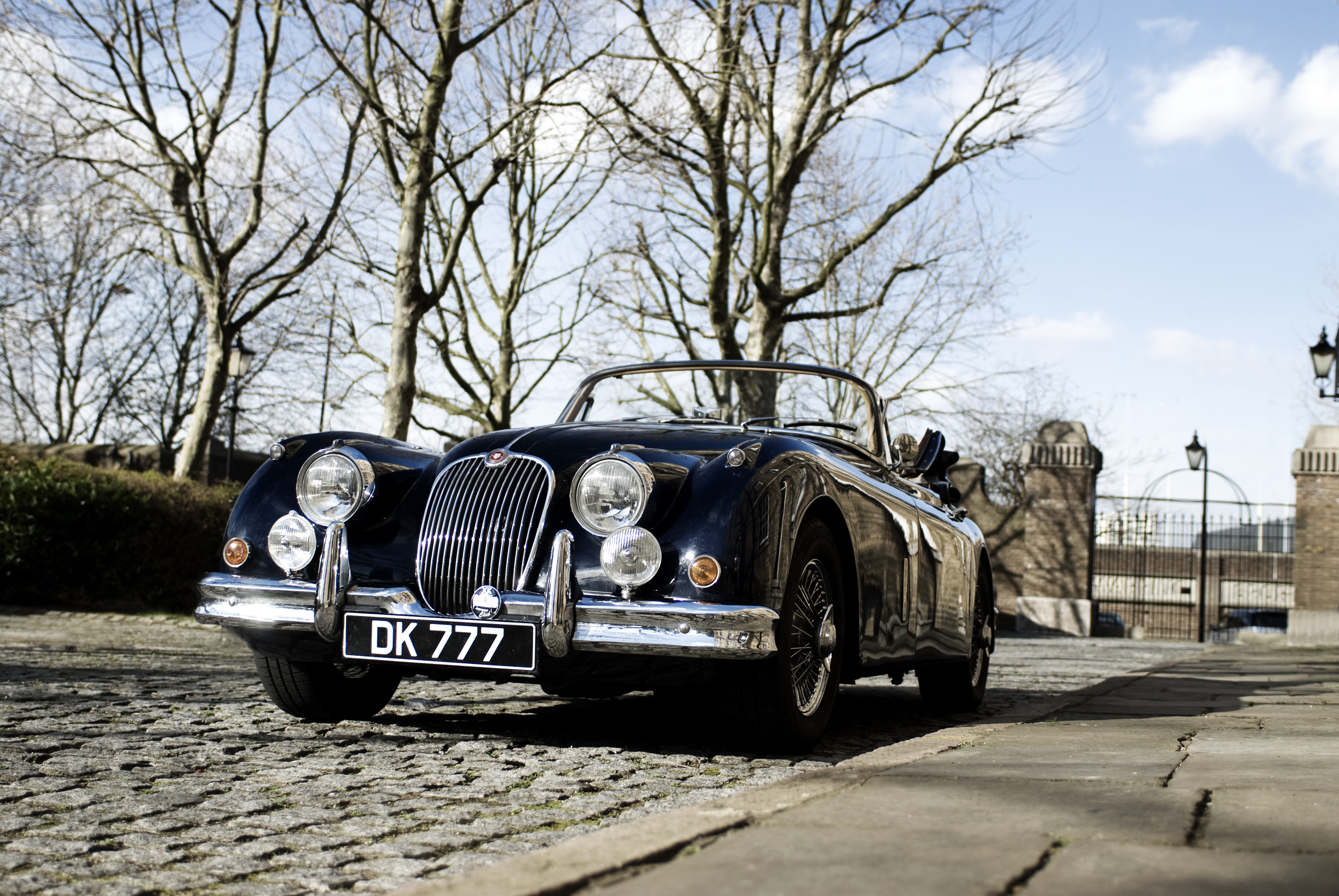
Classic Car Club's 1959 Jaguar XK150

Classic Car Club have over 40 cars. Including 1963 Jaguar E-Type, 2001 TVR Tuscan Speed Six, 1965 Ford Mustang, 1975 Aston Martin V8. The cars are stored at the clubs Hoxton headquarters.

=== Media ===
Classic Car Club hire cars for Photo shoots, Television and Film. The cars have featured in music videos, movies and still shoots featuring I Blame Coco and James Corden. A Selection of the fleet was used in Fast & Furious 6

=== Club Premises ===
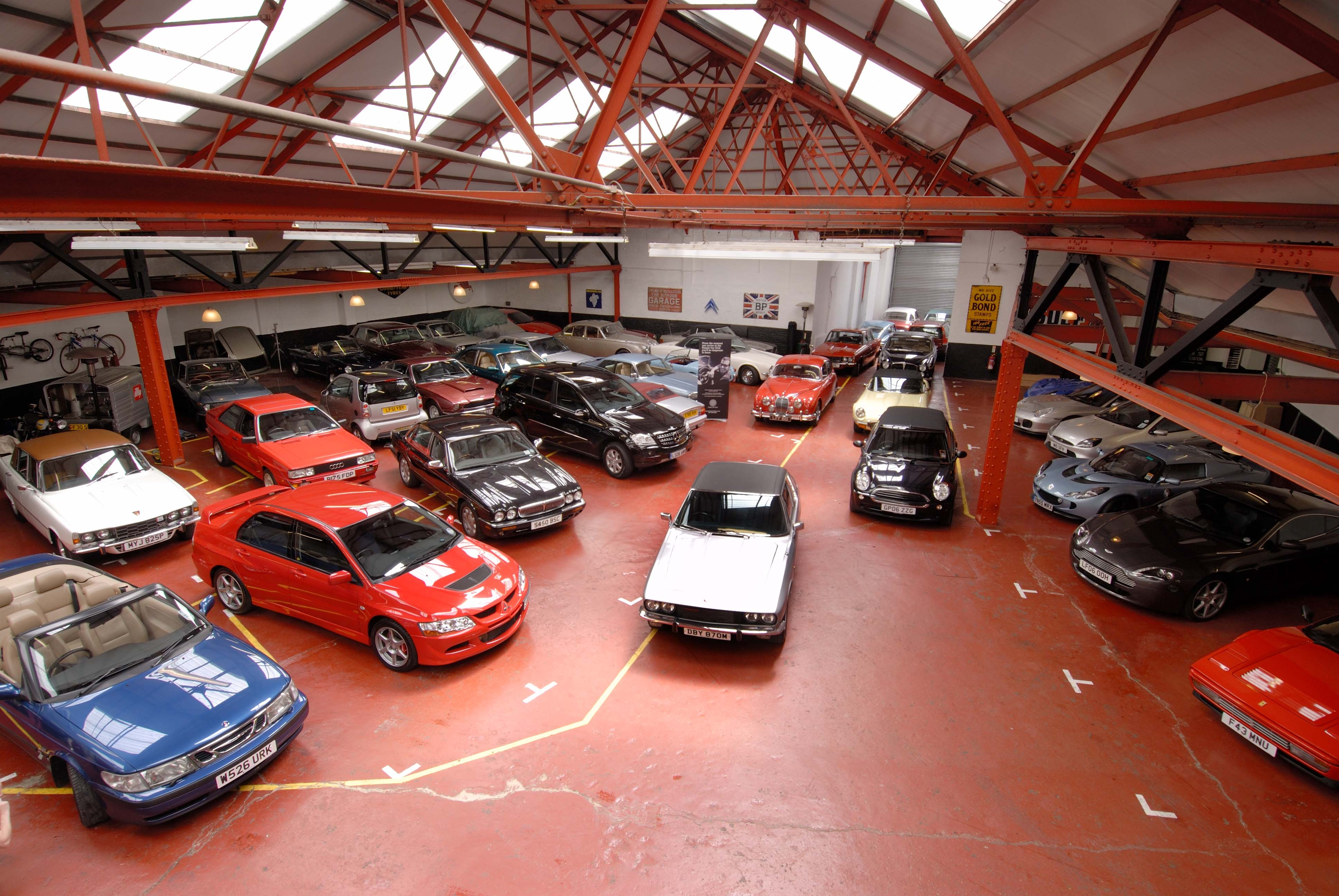
Classic Car Club Interior

The club's Old Street venue is regularly used as an event venue:

- 5 October 2007 Launch of Dave (TV Channel)
- 3 October 2009 Red Bull's Manny Mania skate competition was held at Classic Car Club.
- 3 December 2009 Fenchurch Clothing Fashion show and Party
- 1 February 2011 PlayStation 3 Game Launch MotorStorm: Apocalypse

=== Worldwide ===
Classic Car Club also has a franchise in New York City. Operating a different fleet of cars.
