= Andrew C. Taylor =

American businessman

- Education: University of Denver
- Occupations: Executive chairman at Enterprise Holdings (2013–present)
- Predecessor: Jack C. Taylor
- Successor: Pamela Nicholson

Andrew C. Taylor is an American businessman. He was born in 1947. He is the executive chairman of Enterprise Holdings. Taylor is the son of Jack C. Taylor, who founded Enterprise Rent-A-Car in 1957.

== Early life and career ==
Taylor first began working at Enterprise washing cars when he was 16. He would work during holiday vacations and learn the business from the ground up during summer breaks.

In 1970, Taylor earned a Bachelor of Business Administration from the University of Denver, where he was a member of Tau Kappa Epsilon fraternity. After graduation, he sought experience outside the family business and worked at RLM Leasing, a Ford Motor Company affiliate based in San Francisco, CA. He spent three years there before returning to St. Louis and Enterprise Rent-A-Car.

== Career ==
Between 1970 and 1976, Taylor worked his way up through the company. In 1976, he was promoted to General Manager of the St. Louis region. In 1980, he took the position of President and Chief Operating Officer. In 1990, Andy was promoted to chief executive officer and then chairman in 2001. Enterprise grew from a fleet of 5,000 cars to more than 900,000 vehicles internationally during his tenure. With the purchase of Vanguard Automotive Group in 2007, Enterprise gained both National Car Rental and Alamo Rent A Car. The combined fleet is over 1.5 million vehicles rented out by roughly 100,000 employees. In June 2013, he was named executive chairman.

He also served as a trustee for the Naval Aviation History Foundation, Washington University in St. Louis, and Missouri Botanical Garden. In 2023, Taylor and his wife, Barbara, donated $15 million to Washington University in St. Louis to establish a center to support student success.
