= Citer =

Citer may refer to:

- CITER 155mm L33 Gun, artillery gun used by the Argentine Army
- Citer, French car rental company
- Citers, French village and commune
