= Tilden Rent-a-Car =

Canadian car rental company

Tilden Rent-A-Car
- Type: Private
- Industry: Car rental
- Founded: 1925
- Founder: Sam Tilden
- Defunct: 1996
- Fate: Acquired by National Car Rental

Tilden Rent-a-Car, later known as Tilden InterRent, was a Canadian car rental company that was founded by Sam Tilden. Its fleet was sold by the Tilden family to National Car Rental of the United States in June 1996.

== History ==
=== Origin ===
In 1925, Sam Tilden (1897–1973), a shoe salesman in Montreal, bought the Hertz Rent-a-Car franchise for Montreal after reading an advertisement in The Saturday Evening Post. Tilden started the business with three Chrysler cars and a loan from his father. In 1929, Hertz took the franchise back from Tilden, believing that it could make more money through direct ownership. In 1932, Tilden had won the franchise back from Hertz.

=== 1950s ===
By 1950, Sam Tilden had three Hertz franchises: Montreal, Ottawa and Hamilton, Ontario, and his son, Walter Tilden (1928–2008), was managing the Ottawa franchise. Through the 1950s, Tilden Rent-a-Car expanded rapidly, taking advantage of its independence from car manufacturers. The Victoria, British Columbia franchise was managed by Sam's youngest son, Ted Tilden (1931–1991).

The franchise agreement with Hertz allowed the American company to take back a franchise on 60 days notice, and head office insisted that American advertising copy be used in Canada, although the Canadian franchisees wanted to use copy more appropriate for Canada. In 1953, Sam Tilden and several other franchises, objecting to these policies, left Hertz and set up the Tilden Rent-a-Car System. By 1954, there were 100 Tilden locations throughout Canada.

In 1956, the company started its rent-a-plane business.

=== 1960s ===
In the 1960s, recognizing the opportunities for cross-promotion, Tilden formed a partnership with National Car Rental in the United States. Tilden and National established a joint venture in Europe, 50% owned by each company, under the Europcar name. Tilden later entered into a similar joint venture with Nippon Rent-a-Car of Japan to set up rental agencies in Asia.

By the mid-1960s, Tilden Rent-a-Car System had 2,000 corporate-owned vehicles and 2,500 vehicles owned by independent franchise operators in Canada.

=== 1970s ===
Sam Tilden died of a heart attack in 1973, and the company leadership was taken over by his sons Walter and Ted. In 1974, the company's head office was moved from Montreal to Toronto.

=== Tanker crash, lawsuits, and sale ===
On 6 March 1991, Ted Tilden, who owned 50% of the company, died of a heart attack. Two months later, a Tilden car was involved in an accident in the Bronx, New York City, with a gasoline tanker truck that resulted in a dozen stores burning and explosions in nearby parked cars. This accident played a significant role in the ultimate sale of Tilden Rent-a-Car to National.

In 1992, the name of the company was changed to Tilden InterRent to emphasise its connections to National and Europcar, and National's green colour scheme replaced the red, blue and green scheme that Tilden had been using.

The Bronx accident led to dozens of claims against the company including suits for wrongful death. The company that owned the gas tanker did not have sufficient insurance, and the plaintiffs sought compensation from Tilden.

In June 1995, shortly after his appearance in a wide-ranging corporate and industry interview feature on Montreal's CF Cable 9 Television's Travel World 95 public affairs show, Walter Tilden began negotiations to sell the company. In July 1995, Tilden's car leasing operations were sold to Newcourt Credit Group.

In February 1996, Walter Tilden retired as president and chief executive officer, and was succeeded by his niece Patricia Tilden. Tilden InterRent sought protection under the Companies’ Creditors Arrangement in April 1996 to protect it from the 17 lawsuits it was facing from the Bronx accident. The lawsuits had been consolidated into one suit, causing the company's bankers to become nervous.

In June 1996, a U.S. judge ruled that Tilden could be held liable, and within a week, Tilden's fleet had been sold to National and James H Letang for $115 million. Letang agreed to take on 95% of Tilden's staff, and operate in Canada as "National Tilden". Although many locations continue to use the National Tilden name, the parent company's name was changed to "National" shortly thereafter. The lawsuit arising from the Bronx accident that led to the demise of Tilden as an independent Canadian company was later dismissed.

== Source ==
- Martin, Sandra, "He helped build Tilden Rent-a-Car into a thriving, all-Canadian concern", obituary of Walter Tilden, The Globe and Mail, Toronto edition, 30 July 2008, p. s8.
