= Whizzgo =

WhizzGo
- Company type: Limited Company
- Industry: Car rental
- Founded: 2004
- Founder: Charlotte Morton
- Defunct: 28 August 2009
- Fate: merged into City Car Club, which was sold to Enterprise
- Successor: Enterprise Car Club
- Headquarters: London, England
- Number of employees: 18
- Website: www.whizzgo.co.uk

WhizzGo was a United Kingdom car rental company that provided a pay-by-the-hour car rental service in cities across the UK.

Pay-by-the-hour cars were provided for an hourly price which included insurance, tax, fuel, maintenance and the Congestion Charge for London cars. In 2007, WhizzGo won Best Leasing/rental company of the year, and Private Sector Fleet of the year, in the GreenFleet awards.

On 28 August 2009, WhizzGo was acquired by City Car Club creating the UK's largest network of hourly rental cars. The WhizzGo name was dropped soon after.

== The concept ==
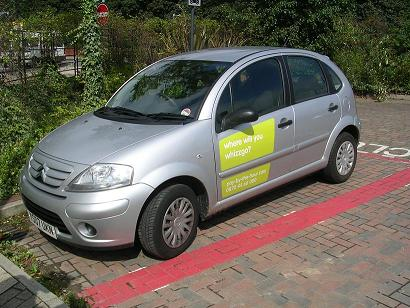
WhizzGo car in 2007

WhizzGo provided a citywide fleet of low emission Citroën cars that were located in designated on-street bays across city centres. WhizzGo offered an "environmentally sustainable service", reducing pollution and congestion by encouraging sustainable transport options so members take fewer car trips and walk, cycle or use public transport more, educating members on green driving tips and carbon offsetting.

Through its expansion, WhizzGo had partnered with Virgin Trains West Coast, public transport operators (such as West Yorkshire Metro and Stagecoach Manchester) and Dahon foldable bikes. WhizzGo had also developed through partnerships with several city councils nationwide such as Leeds, Sheffield, York, Liverpool, Southampton and St Albans.

A joining fee of £25 plus an insurance deposit of £125 was required to join the scheme. Members paid a monthly membership fee of £5 and then can pay-as-they-go by the hour or day. Members were issued with a WhizzGo smart card which was held against a sensor in the windscreen of the vehicle to unlock the doors. Members entered their 4 digit PIN into the on-board computer, took the keys from the glove compartment and drove off.

== Acquisition by City Car Club ==
On 28 August 2009, WhizzGo was acquired by City Car Club creating the UK's largest network of hourly rental cars. The acquisition marked the first major consolidation within the UK car club industry and secured City Car Club a leading position – with 500 cars in 15 cities and a membership base of 16,000.

In November 2009, CityCarClub announced it would be closing some locations; for example, the closure of the St Albans location and new owners could not be found.
