= Pamela Nicholson =

American businesswoman

Pamela M. Nicholson
- Education: University of Missouri
- Occupations: President & CEO at Enterprise Holdings (2008-2019)
- Predecessor: Andrew C. Taylor
- Successor: Chrissy Taylor

Pamela M. Nicholson is an American businesswoman who served as president and chief executive officer of Enterprise Holdings.

== Background and education ==
Pamela Nicholson was born in St. Louis, Missouri in 1960.

She graduated from Parkway Central High School in 1977 and later earned a Bachelor of Arts degree from the University of Missouri in 1981.

== Career with Enterprise ==
Nicholson began her career at Enterprise Rent A Car in 1981 as a Management Trainee in St. Louis. Within nine months, she was promoted to an Assistant Manager Position. Inside of one year, she moved to the rapidly growing Southern California group. Once there, she worked her way to the top tier position of Regional Vice President of the Southern California Group in twelve years. During her work there, the group added 26,000 cars and continues to be one of the company's largest groups.

In 1994, Nicholson was promoted to Corporate Vice President in St. Louis and was given ten groups to oversee. While there, she was considered instrumental in establishing the National Preferred Provider Rental Agreements between Enterprise Rent A Car and many of the auto manufacturers. In 1997, she moved back into a rental as the General Manager of the New York group. She spent two years there increasing fleet growth and doubling profitability. Nicholson then was promoted to Senior Vice President of North American Operations in 1999. In 2003, she became Chief Operating Officer and President in 2008.

On June 4, 2013, it was announced that Nicholson would assume the role of Chief Executive Officer. Nicholson is not only the first female CEO in the company's history but also the first that is not a member of the Taylor family of St. Louis. Her predecessor, Andrew "Andy" Taylor, son of founder Jack Taylor, will continue to stay involved with company activities as Executive Chairman.

In the later part of 2019, it was announced that Pam would be retiring from her position at year's end.

== Recognition ==
- In 2007, Nicholson was included in the Fortune Top 50 Most Powerful Women list as number 44.
- Forbes included her among their 100 Most Powerful Women at number 89 in 2009.
- Nicholson was mentioned in the Forbes list of the Most Powerful Women as number 17 in 2018.
