= Jack C. Taylor =

American businessman and billionaire (1922-2016)

- Born: Jack Crawford Taylor; April 14, 1922; St. Louis, Missouri, US
- Died: July 2, 2016 (aged 94); St. Louis, Missouri, US
- Education: Washington University in St. Louis – Westminster College (Missouri)
- Occupation: Entrepreneur
- Children: 2, including Andrew
- Military career
- Allegiance: United States
- Branch: United States Navy
- Service years: 1942–1945
- Rank: Lieutenant, USNR
- Wars: World War II
- Awards: Distinguished Flying Cross (2); Air Medal; Presidential Unit Citation

Jack Crawford Taylor (April 14, 1922 – July 2, 2016) was an American businessman and billionaire who founded the Enterprise Rent-A-Car Company. Taylor also was a fighter pilot for the United States Navy during World War II.

== Early life and education ==
Taylor was the elder of two sons born in St. Louis, Missouri, to Melburne Martling Taylor and Dorothy Crawford Taylor. Taylor enrolled in the Olin Business School at Washington University in St. Louis in 1940. He left school to join the U.S. Navy. During World War II, he flew F6F Hellcat fighters from the USS Essex (CV-9) and the USS Enterprise (CV-6), earning two Distinguished Flying Crosses and the Navy Air Medal.

== Career ==
After the war, Taylor returned to St. Louis and started a delivery service company. His clients were big department stores and he picked up packages and delivered them to their customers. In 1948, he took a job at the Lindburg Cadillac dealership, where he eventually became a sales manager. In 1957, he started a car-leasing business at the dealership in partnership with his employer, Arthur R. Lindburg. The deal required him to accept a 50-percent pay cut and put up $25,000 ($218,800 today) for a 25% interest in the business. The Executive Leasing Company began operation with seven cars, targeting people whose cars were in the shop for repairs.

In 1969, Taylor expanded beyond St. Louis and changed the name of the company to Enterprise, after the USS Enterprise aircraft carrier upon which he had served in World War II. Unlike his competitors, who focused on business rentals at airports, Taylor concentrated on the hometown market, offering home pickup services which led to Enterprise's "We'll Pick You Up" slogan. His business credo was: "If you take care of your customers and employees, the bottom line will take care of itself."

By 1980, the rental fleet had grown to 6,000 cars. In 1989, the fleet had grown to 50,000 and he changed the name of the company to Enterprise Rent-A-Car. By 1992, the company's revenues surpassed $1 billion; by 1995, they reached $2 billion ($4.11 billion today). In 2007, Enterprise purchased National Car Rental and Alamo Rent-A-Car.

As of 2026, Enterprise's executive chairman is Taylor's son, Andrew C. Taylor, and its CEO is his granddaughter, Chrissy Taylor.

== Philanthropy ==
Among other gifts, Taylor gave:

- $45 million to the Donald Danforth Plant Science Center in St. Louis, Missouri, part of which established the Enterprise Rent-A-Car Institute to pursue green energy projects.
- $40 million to the St. Louis Symphony Orchestra
- $30 million to the Missouri Botanical Garden to fund global plant research. It was the largest gift ever to a U.S. botanical garden.
- $25 million to establish the Enterprise Rent-A-Car Scholars Program at Washington University in St. Louis for minority and financially disadvantaged students
- $1 million to Ranken Technical College in St. Louis
- $22 million to 10 charitable and educational organizations that support underserved children in the St. Louis area
- $92.5 million to 13 cultural institutions and charities, mostly in the St. Louis area

== Personal life ==
Taylor was married and divorced twice. In 1945, Taylor married the former Mary Ann MacCarthy, and the couple had two children: Andrew C. Taylor, who is the executive chairman of Enterprise, and Jo Ann Taylor, who runs the Taylor family philanthropic activities. Taylor and his first wife divorced in 1977 after a long separation, and in 1979, he married Susan Orrison. Taylor and Orrison divorced in 2008. In 1978, Taylor's first wife married E. Desmond Lee, a widower and a prominent businessman and philanthropist in his own right.

Taylor died on July 2, 2016, in St. Louis at the age of 94.

== Honors ==
In 2021, the United States Naval Institute in Annapolis named its new conference center for Taylor.
