= Citer SA =

French car rental company

Citer (National Citer)
- Company type: Subsidiary
- Industry: Car rental
- Founded: 1968
- Founder: Citroën
- Headquarters: France
- Number of locations: ~360 (as of 2011)
- Owner: Enterprise Holdings
- Subsidiaries: Atesa
- Website: www.enterprise.fr

Citer is a French-based car rental company branded as National/Citer. It was established by Citroën in 1968 and was sold to Enterprise Holdings by PSA Peugeot Citroën in 2011.

== Background ==
Citer has owned the Spanish car rental company Atesa since 1989 and was also sold to Enterprise. Since 1998 Citer was a National franchise holder and has 250 sites in France and a further 110 in Spain. In 2011 Citer and Atesa has a fleet of 30,000 vehicles.
