= Vanguard Automotive Group =

Vanguard Car Rental Group Inc.
- Company type: Private
- Industry: Car rental
- Headquarters: Tulsa, Oklahoma
- Key people: Greg Stubblefield (President); Bill Lobeck (CEO)
- Revenue: $12.1 billion (2007)
- Number of employees: 12,600
- Website: vanguardcar.com

Vanguard Automotive Group was a vehicle rental company based in Tulsa, Oklahoma, USA.

Vanguard purchased ANC Rental, owner of National Car Rental and Alamo Rent A Car. It had a fleet of nearly 300,000 vehicles, mainly from Ford and Chrysler, and operated in over 1,500 locations. In 2007, Enterprise agreed to purchase a controlling share in the company from Cerberus Capital Management. A sale to rival Enterprise Rent-A-Car was completed on August 1, 2007, making the combined Enterprise-Alamo-National the largest US car rental operation, ahead of The Hertz Corporation and Avis Budget Group.
