= Alamo Rent a Car =

American car rental brand

- Industry: Car rental
- Founded: 1974; 52 years ago in Orlando, Florida
- Headquarters: Clayton, Missouri, United States
- Key people: Andrew C. Taylor (executive chairman); Chrissy Taylor (president & CEO)
- Parent: Enterprise Holdings
- Website: www.alamo.com

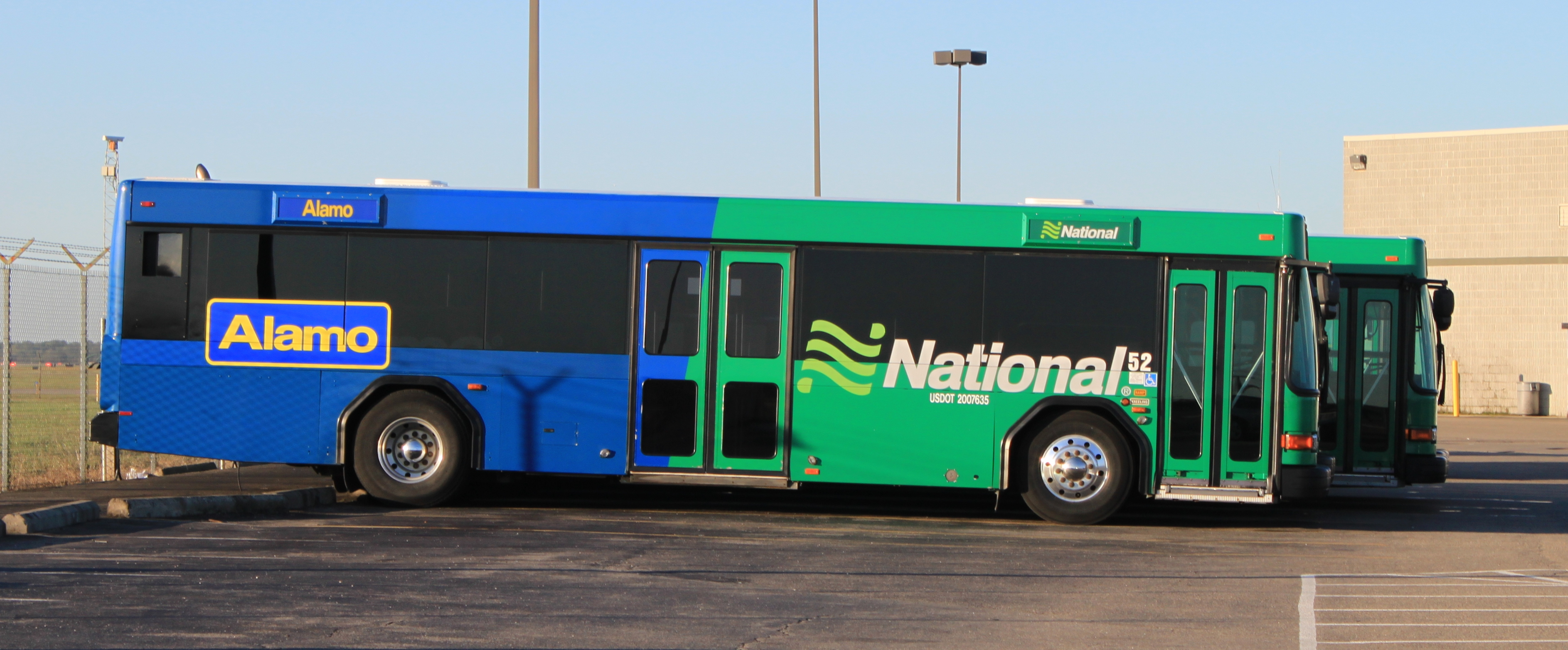
Alamo airport shuttle shared with National Car Rental, Detroit Metro Airport

Alamo Rent a Car is a rental car agency based in Clayton, Missouri, United States. The company has branches across North America, South America, Africa, Europe, Asia, Australia and Oceania. Alamo is owned by Enterprise Holdings, along with other agencies including Enterprise Rent-A-Car and National Car Rental. Alamo typically caters to budget-conscious leisure travelers and is the largest car rental provider to international travelers visiting North America.

== History ==
Alamo was founded in Florida in 1974. In 1982, the company opens its first rental plaza in Tampa, Florida. In 1996, Alamo was acquired by Republic Industries. Two months later, Republic also bought National Car Rental. Republic spun off its car rental properties as ANC Rental in 2000. ANC filed for bankruptcy a year later. The company's assets were sold to Vanguard Automotive Group (controlled by Cerberus Capital Management) in 2003. In 2005, Alamo introduced an online check-in system that allowed customers to submit registration information prior to arrival to bypass counter check-in.

In 2007, Alamo’s parent company Vanguard was acquired by Enterprise Holdings, operator of the largest rental car company in North America. The deal brought the Alamo Rent A Car, Enterprise Rent-A-Car, and National Car Rental brands under one roof.

Since 2015, Alamo has held the naming rights to Kukulcán Alamo Park, the Yucatan Lions of the Mexican Baseball League. That year, the company also expanded into Paraguay through a franchise partner. Alamo introduced a new mobile app in 2018.

In April 2020, Enterprise Holdings laid off 2,000 employees located in Missouri. Workers across its Enterprise, National, and Alamo brands were all affected.

== Complaints and criticism ==
Alamo Rent a Car has been criticized for not providing adequate access to/from terminal buildings to rental car lot for wheelchair users; according to the United States Department of Justice, Alamo was the subject of many such complaints; Alamo reached a settlement with the government regarding the complaints filed by the Department of Justice. There was a report in The Washington Post about problems with customers returning cars after hours; in one instance, a customer returned an undamaged car after hours, but Alamo claimed that it had been rear-ended and demanded an additional $785. Alamo dropped the claim after the renter threatened to take them to court. A report in The Denver Post described a snowbound passenger who was charged $950 per day by Alamo around Christmas time in an instance of apparent price gouging. A report in USA Today suggested that increases in rental car rates, which averaged 4% in 2013, were leading many rental car users to switch to taking taxis instead. Two automobile safety advocacy groups petitioned the Federal Trade Commission in 2010 to bar Enterprise Holdings, the parent company of Alamo, from renting out recalled vehicles that had not been fixed. Alamo was criticized in The New York Times for failing to provide information about insurance rates for its rental cars on its website.
