= Enterprise Car Club =

British car rental company

Enterprise Car Club Limited
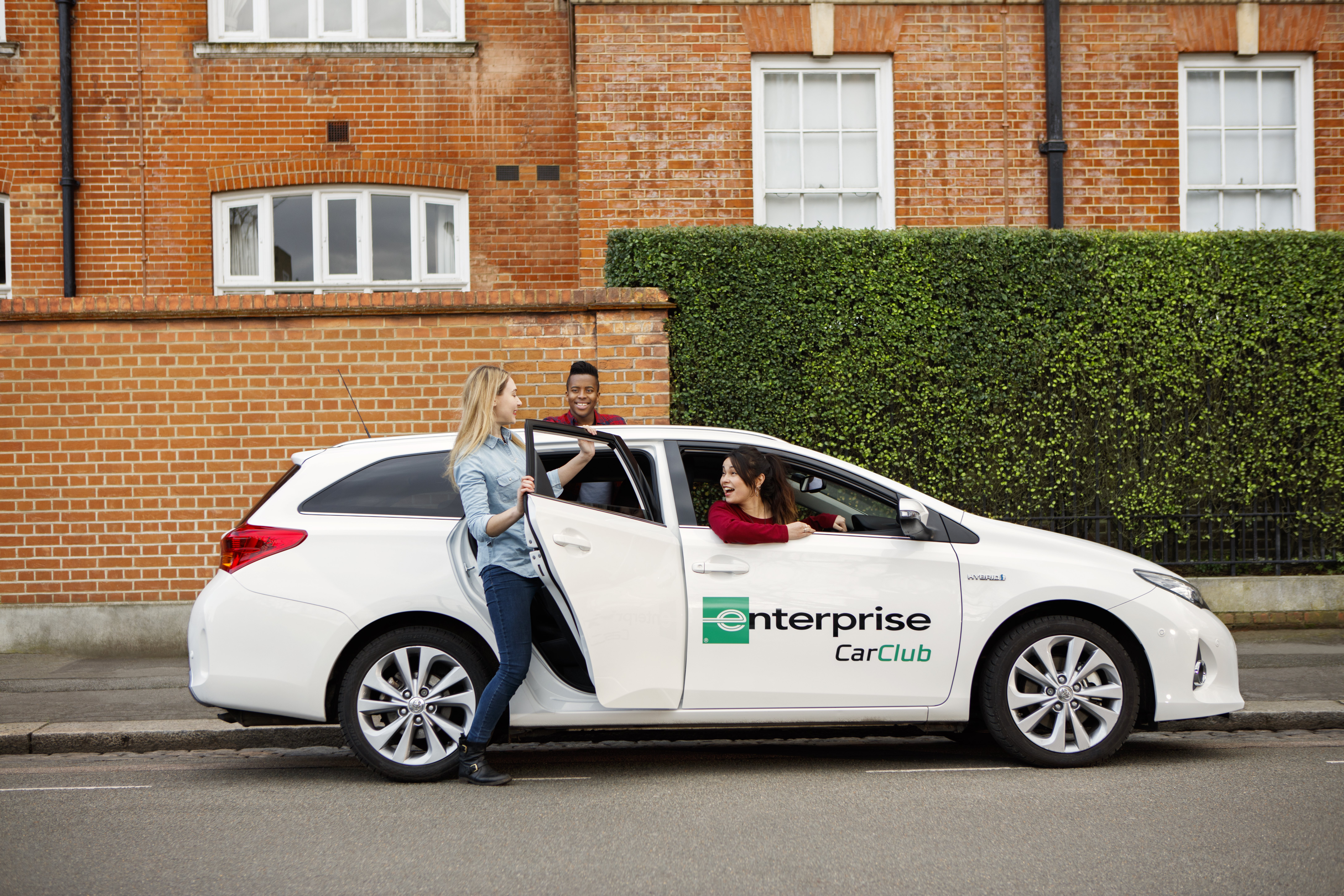
- Company type: Limited company
- Industry: Car hire
- Predecessors: Whizzgo, City Car Club
- Founded: 2000
- Headquarters: Leeds, United Kingdom
- Area served: United Kingdom
- Website: www.enterprisecarclub.co.uk

Enterprise Car Club (formerly City Car Club) is a British car club operator. Established as CityCarClub in 2000, it was acquired by the American company Enterprise Rent-A-Car in 2015, and renamed Enterprise Car Club in 2016. It now has 1,400 vehicles in the UK.

== History ==
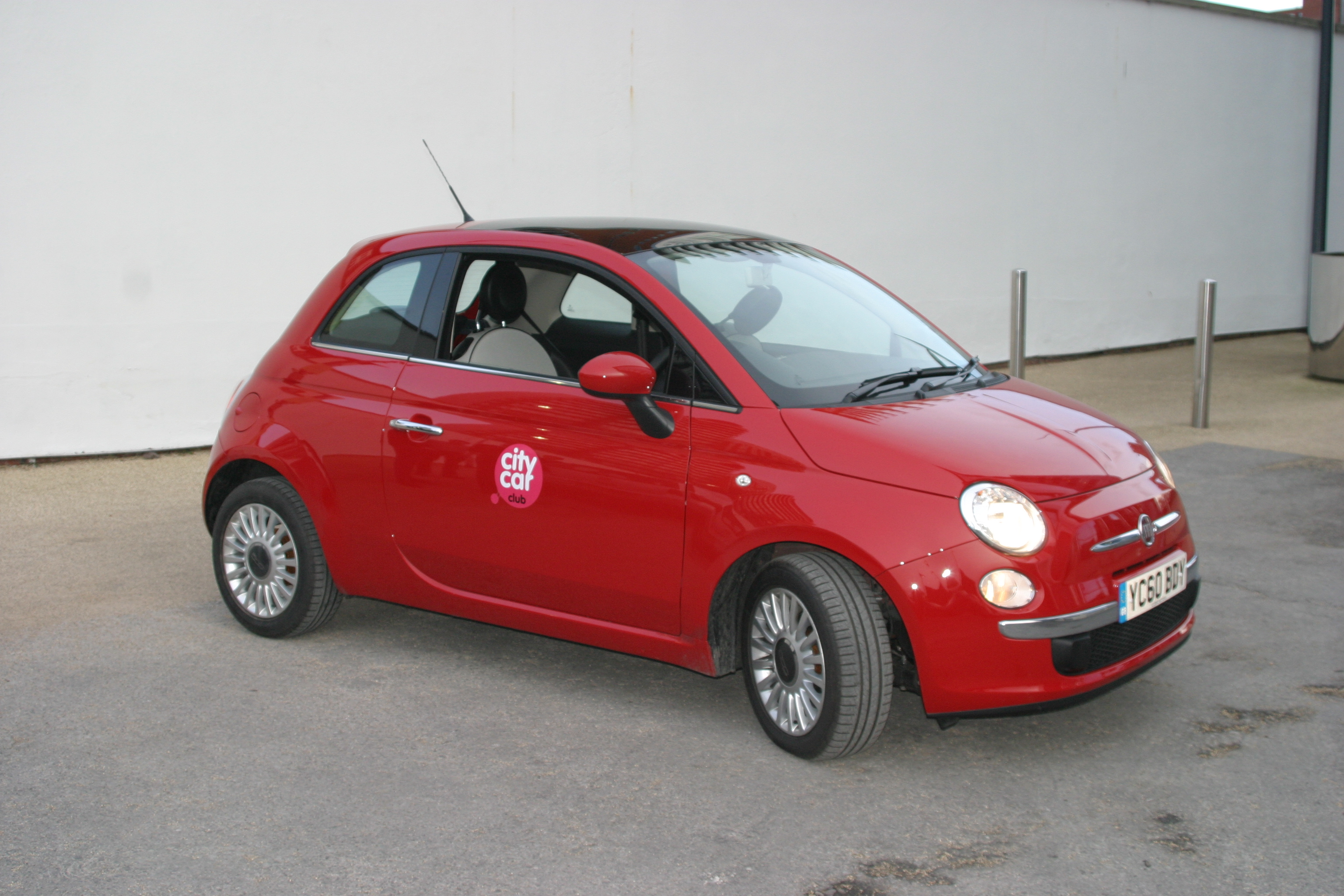
A City Car Club Fiat 500

City Car Club was established in 2000 in London and Edinburgh.

By 2007, it was using online booking with smartcard access to the cars. The company worked in partnership with communities to reduce the need for conventional car ownership. In 2009, it acquired WhizzGo, thereby creating the UK's largest network of hourly rental cars. This marked the first major consolidation within the UK car club industry and secured City Car Club's leading position, with 500 cars in 13 cities and a membership base of 20,000.

The company was acquired by Enterprise Rent-A-Car in 2015, and renamed in 2016.

== Membership ==
Previously, upon joining, members are issued with a membership number, and four-digit PIN. They can then log on to the Car Club website to browse vehicle locations and book vehicles. Alternatively members may call the 'Clubhouse' to book over the phone. Users then unlock and lock the vehicles by tapping their membership or other nominated RFID card on the windscreen-mounted card reader, or by using the app while standing beside the vehicle. Members can extend their booking while it is under way using the on-board computer mounted in the glovebox, provided the vehicle is available for the time specified.

However in 2024, new Technology was introduced and users can now use the dedicated app to start and end their trip. They can also extend their trip via this app. The Card Readers and in car handsets have now been retired. Customer who need assistance can contact the ECC Clubhouse via the number provided on the confirmation email, 24/7.

When the fuel gauge reaches 1/4, members are asked to fill the tank using the fuel card supplied in an information folder with each vehicle. Members are charged per mile, rather than the fuel or electricity purchase price.
