= Enterprise Rent-A-Car =

American car rental brand

- Formerly: Executive Leasing Company (1957–1970)
- Industry: Car rental
- Founded: 1957; 69 years ago in St Louis, Missouri
- Founder: Jack C. Taylor
- Headquarters: Clayton, Missouri, United States
- Key people: Andrew C. Taylor (executive chairman); Chrissy Taylor (president & CEO)
- Parent: Enterprise Mobility
- Website: enterprise.com

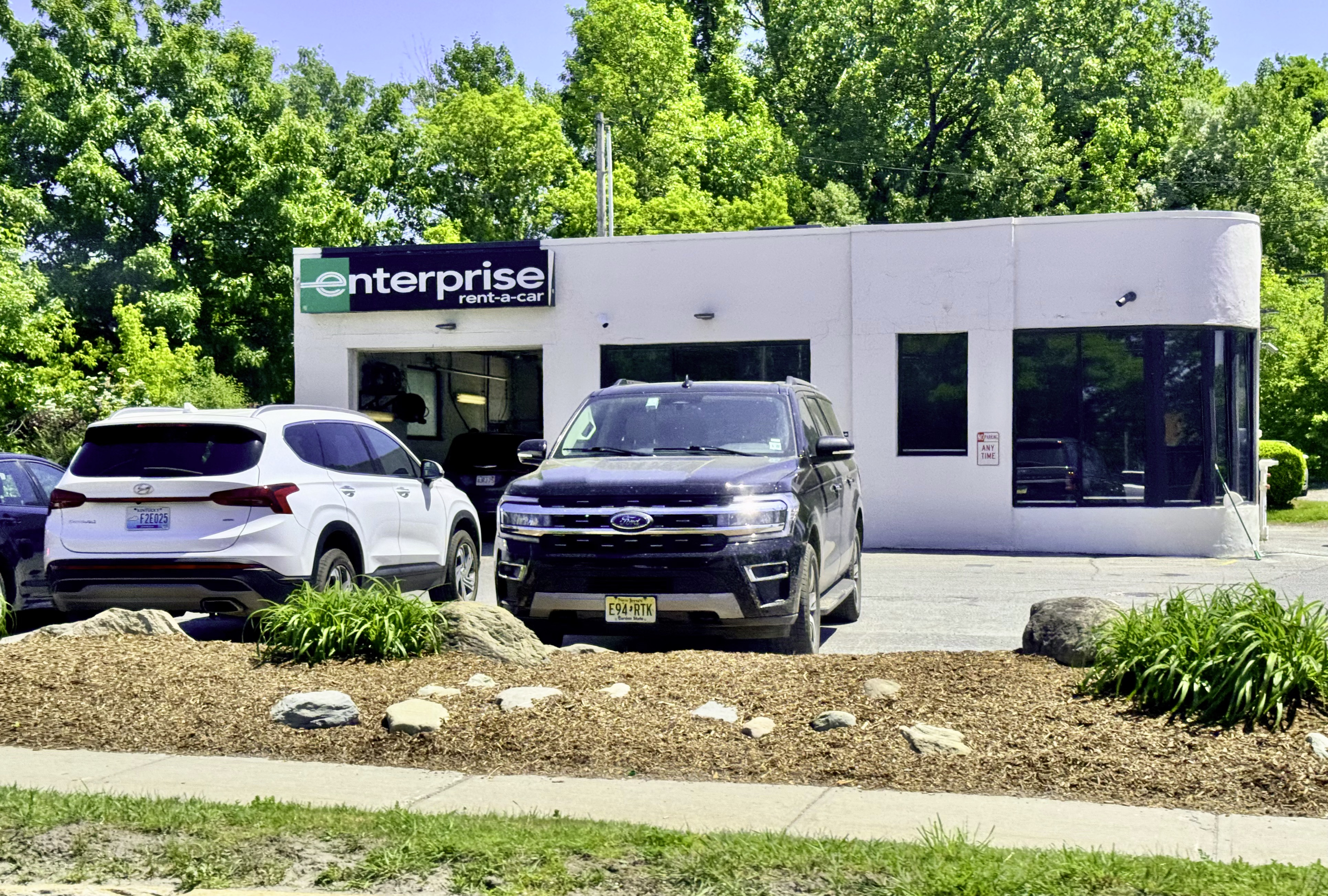
Enterprise Rent-A-Car in South Burlington, Vermont

Enterprise Rent-A-Car is an American car rental agency headquartered in Clayton, Missouri, in Greater St. Louis. Enterprise is the flagship brand of Enterprise Holdings, which also owns other agencies including Alamo Rent a Car and National Car Rental. The company has historically concentrated on what it calls "home city" rentals, often people renting a car while their own was being repaired, but has expanded to airport-based rentals, especially after its parent company's acquisition of Alamo and National in 2007.

In addition to car rental, Enterprise Holdings also markets other transportation services under the Enterprise name including commercial fleet management, used car sales under the name Enterprise Car Sales, and commercial truck rental operations.

Enterprise Rent-A-Car was established in St. Louis, Missouri, in 1957 by Jack C. Taylor. Originally known as "Executive Leasing Company," in 1969, Taylor renamed the company "Enterprise" after the aircraft carrier USS Enterprise, on which he served during World War II.

== Company information ==
Interior customer service counter of Enterprise Rent-A-Car in Blairsville, Georgia

Enterprise Rent-A-Car is the largest rental car company in the United States, with more than 9,000 "home city" locations, and over 230 airport locations.

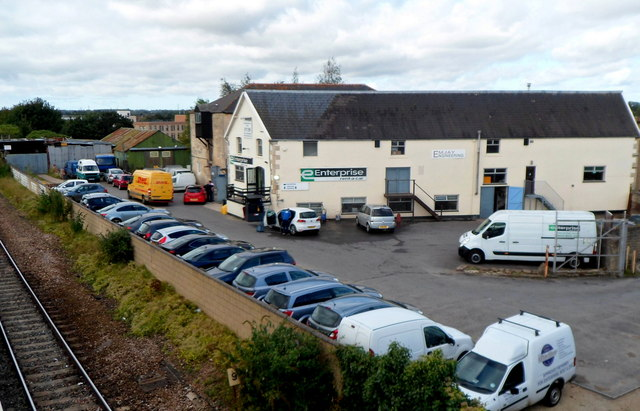
Enterprise Rent-A-Car in Chippenham, UK

Enterprise Rent-A-Car's primary focus is the local rental car market, specializing in car rentals to consumers who need a replacement car as the result of an accident, mechanical repair, theft, or who require a vehicle for a special occasion such as a short business or leisure trip. In 1995, Enterprise Rent-A-Car also began expanding its operations to include the airport market, and now serves airports in the United States, Canada, the United Kingdom, Spain, Germany, and Ireland. The company's initial entry into Europe came in 1994.

Enterprise rents a wide variety of vehicles that range from economy cars to exotic vehicles. It also rents commercial cargo vans, pickup trucks and box trucks under the Enterprise Truck Rental brand.

By 2005, Enterprise Rent-A-Car's customer service has been recognized seven times by J.D. Power and Associates as highest in customer satisfaction for rental car companies at or near airports. The company was named ninth on Business Week's top 25 companies customer service list in 2007.

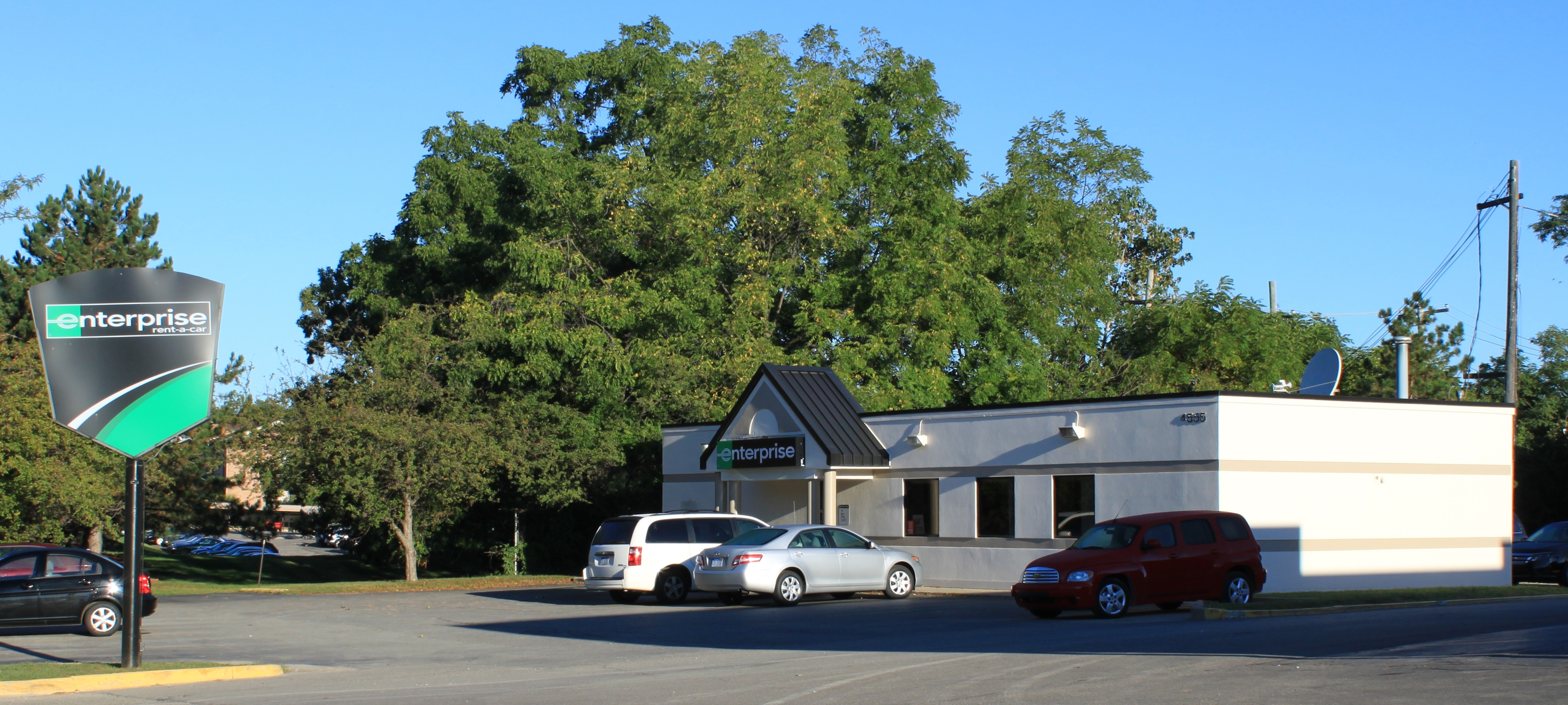
Enterprise Rent-A-Car in Pittsfield Township, Michigan

In 2006, Business Week listed Enterprise among the top 10 places to begin a career. Although the company's pay for management trainees was among the lowest on the list (at an average $34,000), "those who catch on" quickly get a chance to run a branch office with the responsibility to generate a profit. Certain requirements and qualifications must be met to get promoted to an assistant manager, and many of these qualifications may depend on the employees' sales and their success in the company's management training program. According to BusinessWeek's list of "Best Places to Launch a Career", Enterprise was in the top 15. Within five years, a successful manager may take positions at headquarters or become an area manager responsible for multiple branches.

In addition to renting vehicles, Enterprise sells vehicles that are displaced from its fleet at used car dealerships nationwide as Enterprise Car Sales.

== International growth ==
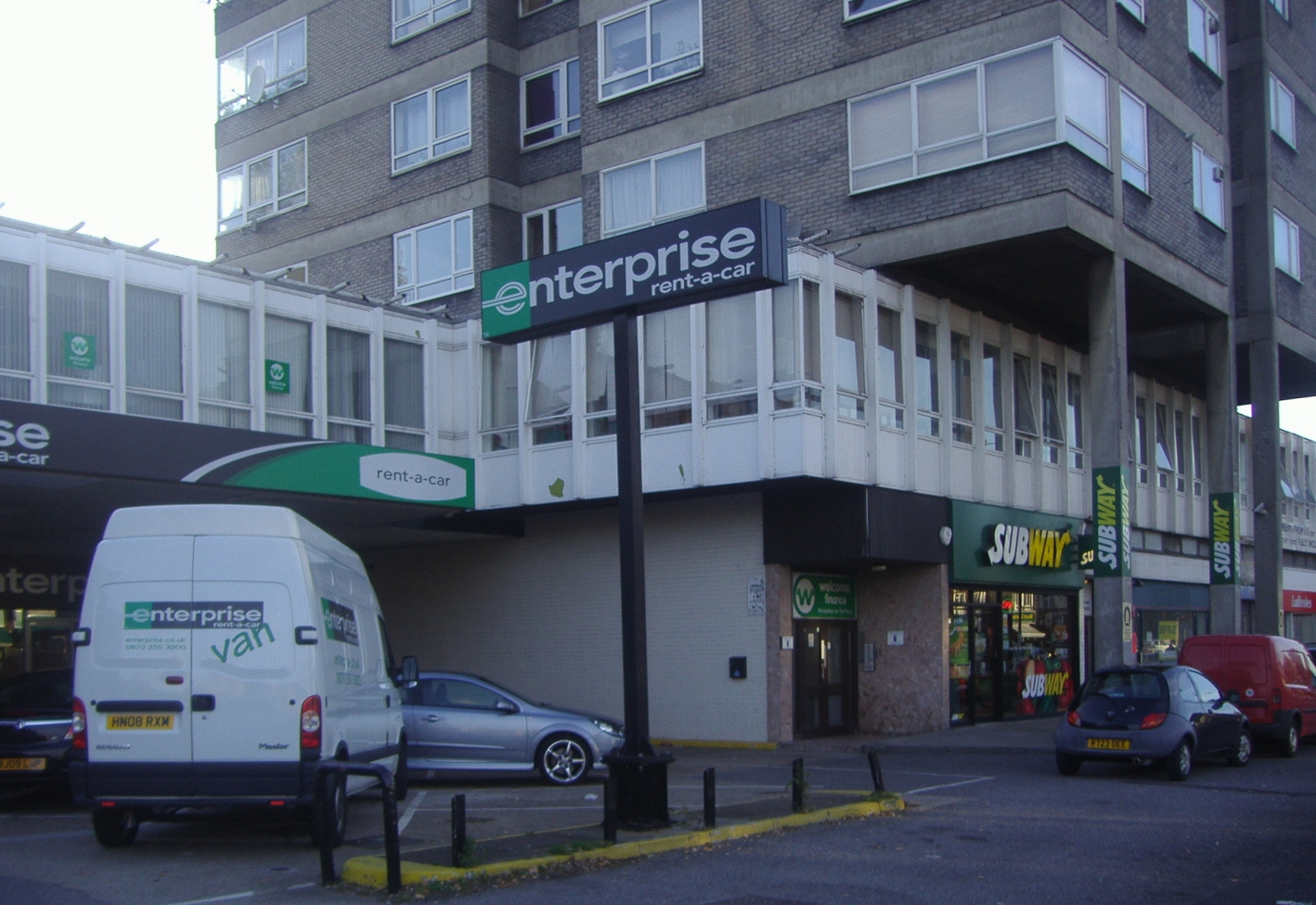
Enterprise Rent-A-Car in Feltham, United Kingdom

As of 2021 Enterprise Rent-A-Car operates the largest rental network globally. With a network of approximately 9,500 car rental locations in nearly 100 countries and territories by October 2020, Enterprise Rent-A-Car has continued to expand into new locations well into 2021.

Several countries within the Enterprise network are operated through franchise partnerships.

Some of the countries in which Enterprise operate include Argentina, Armenia, Australia, Austria, Belgium, Bulgaria, Canada, Costa Rica, Croatia, Czech Republic, Denmark, Finland, France, Georgia, Germany, Greece, Hungary, Iceland, Ireland, Italy, Jamaica, Latvia, Mexico, Netherlands, New Zealand, Norway, Poland, Portugal, Romania, Spain, Sweden, Switzerland, and the United Kingdom.

== Controversies ==
=== Safety ===
During model years 2006–2008, 66,000 of the Chevrolet Impalas the company ordered were purchased without side-curtain airbags, saving the company $11.5 million ($175 per vehicle), though the airbags were standard in retail models. The practice, which the company notes does not "violate any federal mandate", came to national attention when cars being retired from their rental fleet were sold with claims that side-curtain air bags were included. About 5,000 Chevrolet Cobalts and Buick LaCrosses were also purchased with the side air bags omitted. Enterprise admitted that it inaccurately advertised and sold 745 Chevrolet Impalas—model years 2006 through 2008—that were identified online as having side air bags, when in fact they did not. A company spokesman said that it would inform customers who had bought the cars, and offer to buy them back from the customers.

According to Safety Research and Strategies, a safety research firm that regularly works with the automotive industry, deleting safety features is a highly unusual practice. "I’ve never seen a standard safety feature removed from a vehicle. I’ve been doing this work for 17 years and, until now, had yet to see this happen," said Sean Kane of Safety Research and Strategies.

=== Slogans ===
In August 1998, Enterprise took legal action against car rental competitors Hertz and Advantage in regards to similarities between the companies' slogans. In 1994, Enterprise adopted the slogan "We'll pick you up." Four years later, the company felt that Hertz and Advantage were using slogans at the time that imitated its own too closely. Hertz rejected the claim, with the company's assistant general counsel David Parkoff saying Hertz, "believes that it can use the English language words 'we'll pick you up' and their variants in a descriptive/informational sense as it presently does and that Enterprise's claim of trademark rights in those words is misplaced and does not prevent such use."

Months before, in May, a judge ruling ordered the Rent-a-Wreck of America rental agency to stop using slogans containing the phrase "pick you up."

=== Renting cars to ICE agents ===
In January 2026, protesters targeted Enterprise rental locations in Minnesota after Enterprise was accused by the Sunrise Movement of renting cars to ICE agents during Operation Metro Surge. Participants disrupted operations by creating reservations for rental cars and subsequently canceling those reservations in order to limit vehicle availability to ICE.

== Enterprise CarShare ==
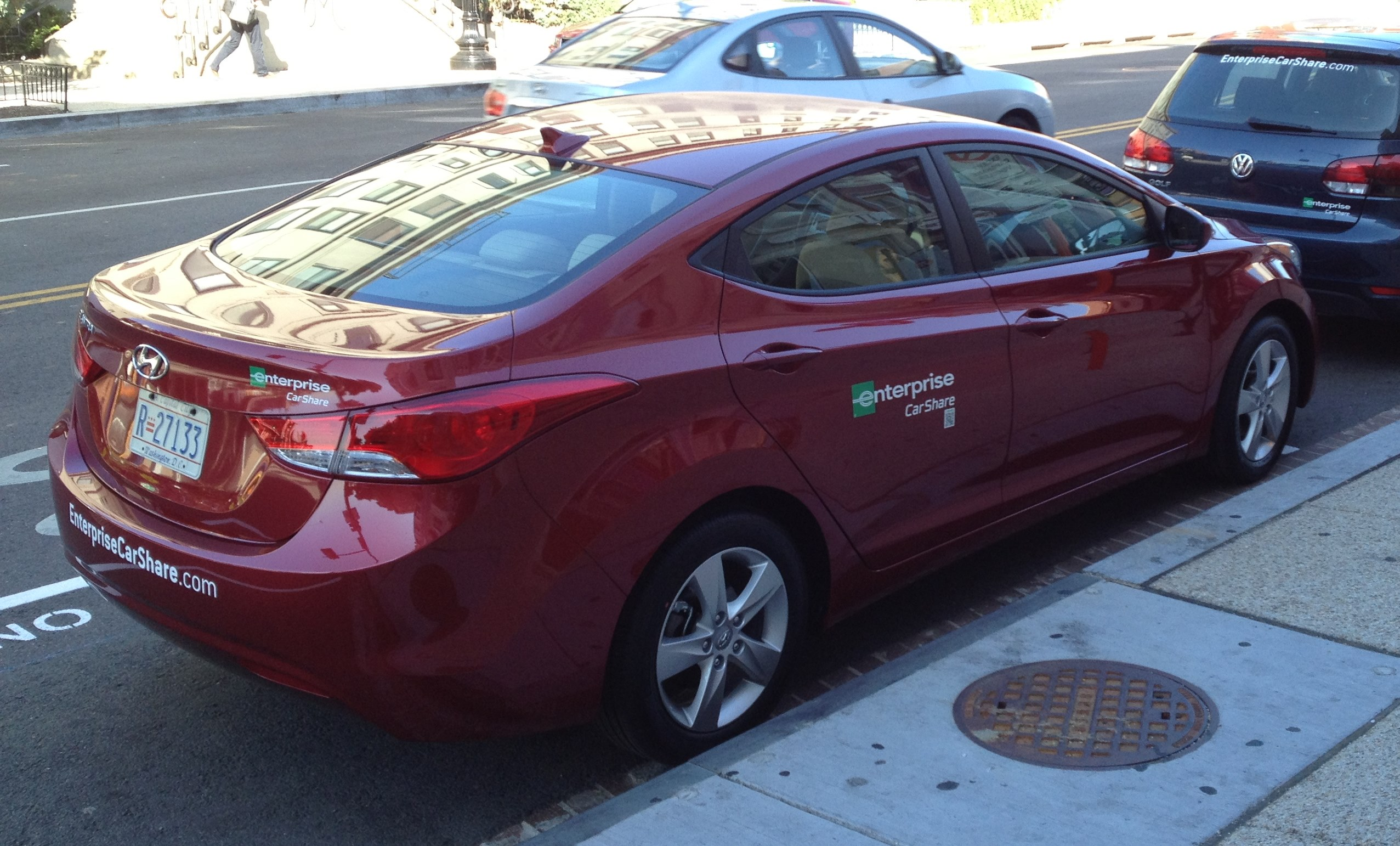
Enterprise CarShare cars on a street in Washington, DC.

In 2008, Enterprise piloted its first on-campus carsharing program at Washington University in St. Louis. The program, called WeCar, was introduced at the University of South Florida in July 2009. As of September 2012, WeCar has 100 carsharing programs in more than 30 American states and Canada, and the service offers almost 100 electric cars and plug-in hybrids, including the Nissan Leaf and the Chevrolet Volt.

By September 2013, WeCar was rebranded as Enterprise CarShare.

In April 2015 Enterprise acquired City Car Club in the United Kingdom, renaming it Enterprise Car Club.

== Sponsorships ==
Enterprise Rent-A-Car is the official car rental service of the NCAA, NHL, UEFA Europa League and the National League. From 2004 to 2010, it was a sponsor of the Professional Bull Riders (PBR) circuit. In 2018, it entered into a 15-year agreement to hold the naming rights for Enterprise Center, the home arena of the St. Louis Blues.
