= National Car Rental =

American car rental brand

- Industry: Car rental
- Founded: August 27, 1947; 78 years ago
- Headquarters: Clayton, Missouri, United States
- Parent: Enterprise Holdings
- Website: www.nationalcar.com

National Car Rental is a private American rental car agency based in Clayton, Missouri, United States. National is owned by Enterprise Holdings, along with other agencies including Enterprise Rent-A-Car, and Alamo Rent a Car. National typically caters to business travelers through its Emerald Club loyalty program that allows frequent customers to pick their own vehicles without stopping to fill out forms or deal with customer representatives.

== Overview ==
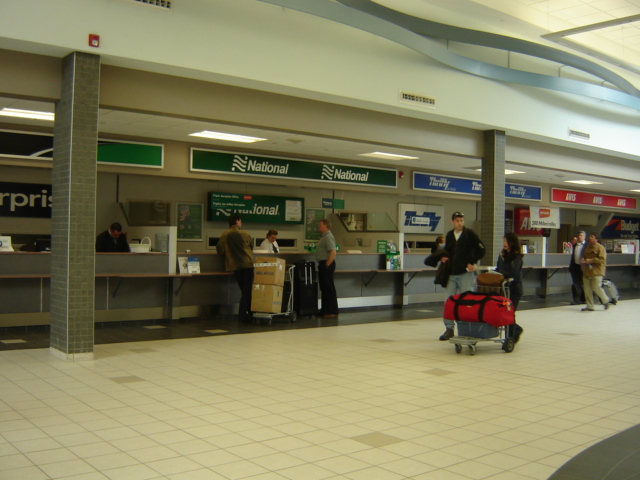
Rental counter at the Saskatoon, Canada International Airport

National was founded by 24 independent rental car agents on August 27, 1947. It had grown from 60 locations in the United States in 1947 to over 2000 locations internationally as of 2005.

In 1987, Paine Webber, a historical American brokerage firm, gained majority ownership of National.

In 1995, National was owned by an investment group containing William Lobeck of Tulsa, Alvin Swanner of New Orleans, and Archer McWhorter of Houston. Lobeck was a former president of Chrysler's car rental unit and a former owner of Thrifty Rent A Car, a competitor of National. It was later sold in 1995 at an estimated price of $1 billion.

In 1996, National along with James H Letang acquired the Canadian fleet and operations of Tilden Rent-a-Car.

In 1996, National was acquired by Republic Industries (later renamed AutoNation). AutoNation spun off its car rental properties as ANC Rental in 2000. ANC filed for bankruptcy a year later; its properties were sold to Vanguard Automotive Group headed by William Lobeck and partners (controlled by Cerberus Capital Management) in 2003. On August 1, 2007 Enterprise Rent-A-Car assumed control of Vanguard Automotive Group.
