= Bo Prefecture =

Bo Prefecture may refer to:

- Bo Prefecture (Anhui) (亳州), a prefecture between the 7th and 20th centuries in modern Anhui and Henan, China
- Bo Prefecture (Shandong) (博州), a prefecture between the 6th and 13th centuries in modern Shandong, China
- Bo Prefecture (Guizhou) (播州), a prefecture between the 7th and 12th centuries in modern Guizhou, China

== See also ==
- Bozhou, modern city in Anhui named after the historical prefecture
- Bozhou (disambiguation)
- Bo (disambiguation)
