= Bo =

Bo or BO may refer to:

== Arts and entertainment ==
- Box office, where tickets to an event are sold, and by extension, the amount of business a production receives
- BA:BO, 2008 South Korean film
- Bo (film), a Belgian film starring Ella-June Henrard and directed by Hans Herbots
- Bo (instrument), a Chinese cymbal
- Bo, a Greek rapper
- Bō: Path of the Teal Lotus, a platform game
- Call of Duty: Black Ops, a first-person shooter video game
- Blood Omen: Legacy of Kain, first in the Legacy of Kain video game series

== People ==
- Bo (given name), name origin, plus a list of people and fictional characters with the name or nickname
- Bo (surname), name origin, plus a list of people with the surname
  - Bo (Chinese surname), Chinese family names
  - Bő (genus), Hungarian medieval noble clan
- Bø (disambiguation), which includes several people with the surname
- Bo people (China), a nearly extinct minority population in Southern China
- Bo people (Laos), a very small minority ethnic group in central Laos
- Bo people (Andaman), a recently extinct group in the Andaman Islands

== Places ==
- Bő, Hungary, a village
- Bø (disambiguation), various places in Norway
- Bo, Chanthaburi, Thailand
- Bo, Hòa Bình, Vietnam
- Bo, Sierra Leone, a city
  - Bo District, includes the city in Sierra Leone
- Bo, Yaba, Burkina Faso
- Le Bô, a commune in the Calvados departement, France
- Palazzo Bo, or "Il Bo", the historic seat of the University of Padua in Italy
- Bo (亳; bó, Bó), the original capital of Tang of Shang, who founded China's Shang Dynasty; its location is disputed. Two strong candidates are Yanshi Shang City and Zhengzhou Shang City

== Religion ==
- Bo or Bodhi Tree
- Bo (parsha), fifteenth weekly Torah reading

== Science and mathematics ==
=== Biology and medicine ===
- Bacterial overgrowth, a medical disorder of malabsorption
- Bowel obstruction
- Bronchiolitis obliterans
- BO strain of the Caenorhabditis elegans var. Bergerac model worm
- Ficus religiosa, a.k.a. Bo-Tree, a species of Asian fig

=== Mathematics ===
- $\operatorname{BO}(n)$, Classifying space for orthogonal group
- $\operatorname{BO}$, Classifying space for infinite orthogonal group

=== Chemistry and physics ===
- In chemistry and physics, the Born–Oppenheimer approximation
- The chemical formula for boron monoxide

== Codes ==
- Bolivia (ISO 3166-1 country code)
  - .bo, Internet country code top-level domain (ccTLD) for Bolivia
- Belarus, obsolete NATO and FIPS country codes
- Baltimore and Ohio Railroad (reporting mark BO)
- Bouraq Indonesia Airlines (IATA airline code BO)
- Bo, the UIC classification for the railroad locomotive wheel arrangement 0-4-0, in the Whyte notation
- "bo", Standard Tibetan ISO 639-1 language code

== Acronyms ==
- Body odor or B.O.
- Back Orifice, remote administration software
- Barrel of Oil, sometimes used in place of bbl
- Beneficial owner, in property law
- Biarritz Olympique, a French rugby union club
- Business Objects (company), an enterprise software company

== Other uses ==
- Bō, or east Asian quarterstaff, a staff weapon used in the martial art Bōjutsu
- Bo (title), a Chinese title typically translated as "count"
- Bō, a Japanese honorific suffix
- Bó (bank), a banking brand in the United Kingdom
- Bo (dog) (2008–2021), a pet belonging to U.S. President Barack Obama
- Bo (kana), in syllabic Japanese script
- Bojagi or bo, a Korean wrapping cloth
- Bo School, a secondary school in Bo, Sierra Leone
- Bo language (disambiguation)

== See also ==
- Pages that begin with "Bo"
- Pages that include "Bo"
- B0 (disambiguation)
- BOH (disambiguation)
- Beau (disambiguation)
- Bow (disambiguation)
