= Bozhou (disambiguation) =

Bozhou (亳州) is a prefecture-level city in Anhui, China, named after the historical prefecture.

Bozhou may also refer to the following places in China:

== Modern places ==
- Bozhou District (播州), Guizhou, named after the tusi chiefdom
- Bozhou, Hunan (波洲), a town in Xinhuang Dong Autonomous County, Hunan
- Bortala Mongol Autonomous Prefecture, prefecture in Xinjiang, sometimes abbreviated as Bozhou (博州)
- Bozhou, Xinhuang (波洲镇), a town of Xinhuang Dong Autonomous County, Hunan

== Historical prefectures ==
- Bo Prefecture (Anhui), prefecture between the 7th and 20th centuries in modern Anhui and Henan
- Bo Prefecture (Shandong) (博州), prefecture between the 6th and 13th centuries in modern Shandong
- Bozhou Tusi or Bo Prefecture (播州), prefecture and chiefdom in modern Guizhou

== See also ==
- Bo (disambiguation)
