= 0B =

0B (zero B) or 0-B may refer to:

== Science and technology ==
- Type 0B string theory, a variant of Type 0 string theory
- Binary numeral system (prefix: 0B)
- Zero-based numbering, numbering in which the initial element of a sequence is assigned the index 0
- Zero-based array, an array data type in computer science

== Other uses ==
- Zero-based budgeting, a technique of planning and decision-making which reverses the working process of traditional budgeting
- Blue Air (former IATA code: 0B), a former Romanian low-cost airline
- Turret 0B, a point on Hadrian's Wall associated with Milecastle 0

== See also ==
- B0 (disambiguation)
