= Bluecity =

Defunct London based company providing electric car sharing services

Bluecity (UK) Ltd

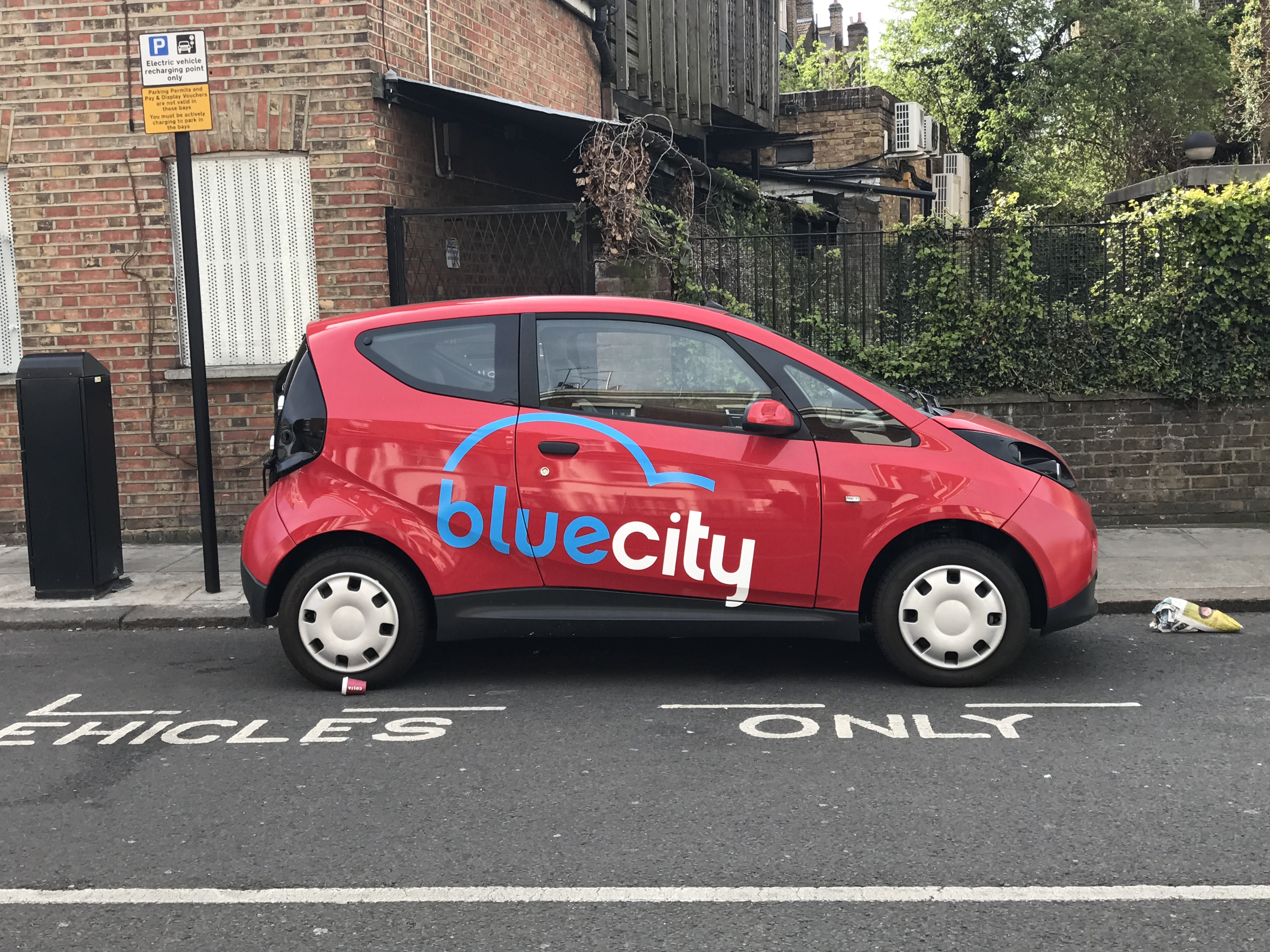
- Bolloré Bluecar Bluecity car share in Hammersmith, London in 2017
- Company type: Private
- Industry: Car rental
- Founded: 26 April 2017; 9 years ago
- Defunct: 10 February 2020; 6 years ago
- Area served: London
- Services: Carsharing; Charging station
- Parent: Bolloré
- Website: www.blue-city.co.uk

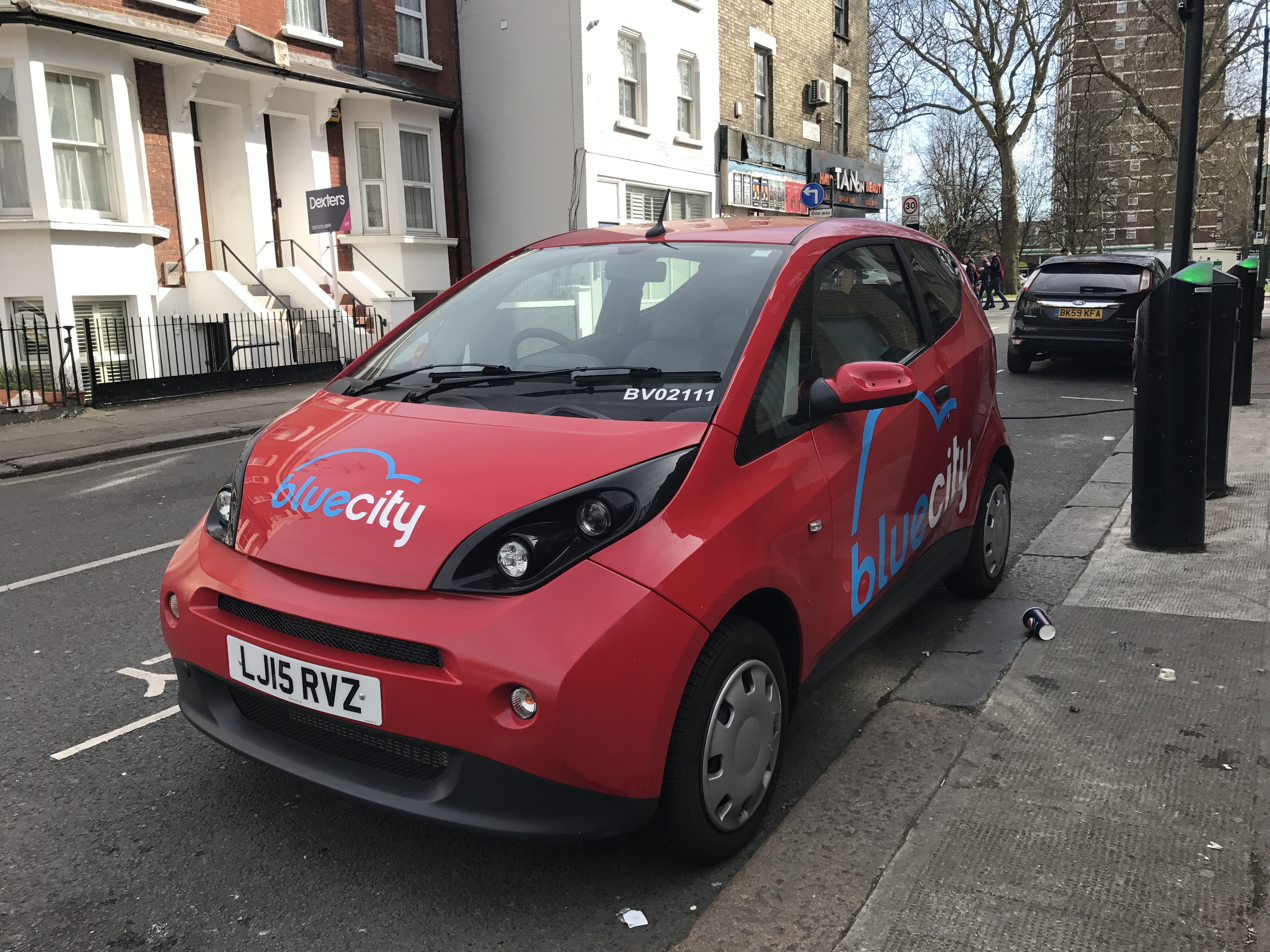
Bolloré Bluecar Bluecity car share

Bluecity was a London-based company providing electric car-sharing services, starting from 26 April 2017 to 10 February 2020. The cars provided by the service were Bolloré Bluecars by the Bolloré group.

== Fleet ==
The service used the all-electric Bolloré Bluecar, which were adapted to suit London's left-hand traffic. It is a three-door hatchback electric car with four seats and has a 30kWh lithium metal polymer (LMP) battery, coupled to a supercapacitor, that provides an electric range of 250 km (160 mi) in urban use, and a maximum speed of 120 km/h (75 mph).

== Operations ==
The scheme was operational first in London Borough of Hammersmith and Fulham from June 2017, and the London Borough of Merton followed shortly after.

In 2018, Bluecity located 10 cars at Gatwick Airport.

Bluecity shut down permanently on 10 February 2020, after reaching agreements with only three of London's thirty-three local authorities.

== See also ==
- Autolib'
- BlueSG
