= B0 =

B0 may refer to:

- B_{0}, a net magnetisation vector in medical imaging
- La Compagnie, a French airline (IATA code B0)
- Neutral B meson (B^{0})
- Pininfarina B0, an electric car
- Renault/Dacia B0 platform, an automobile platform
- B0, an ISO 216 paper size
- B-0, the original name for the FLOW-MATIC data processing language
- B0 star, a subclass of B-class stars

== See also ==
- Bo (disambiguation)
