= BOH =

BOH or Boh may refer to:

== Places ==
- Boh (woreda), administrative division of Ethiopia
- Bohemia (BOH is the obsolete country code in FIFA and the International Olympic Committee)
- Bohol, Philippines (ISO provincial code: BOH)
- Bournemouth Airport, England (IATA code: BOH)
- Southern Bug River or Southern Buh in Ukraine

== Other uses ==
- Boh (surname), a family name
- Back of house, a term for work operations and spaces not usually visible to customers or guests
- shortened version of the given name Bohumil
- National Bohemian Beer, or Mr. Boh, its former mascot and local cultural icon in Baltimore, Maryland
- 3,4-methylenedioxy-beta-methoxyphenethylamine, a drug featured in PiHKAL, and analogue of MDMA
- BOH Plantations Sdn. Bhd., a tea company in Cameron Highlands, Malaysia
- Band of Horses, an American indie rock band
- Back of the House – the kitchen area in food service industry establishments
- Bank of Hawaii
- Bachelor of Oral Health
- Boma language of DR Congo (ISO 639-3 code: boh)
- Bora–Hansgrohe, cycling team (UCI code: BOH)

== See also ==
- Boch (disambiguation)
