= BlueSG =

Singaporean electric car sharing company

Flexar (BlueSG Pte Ltd)
- Type: Private
- Industry: Car rental
- Founded: 2017; 9 years ago
- Headquarters: 48 Changi South Street 1, Tampines, East Region, Singapore
- Area served: Singapore
- Key people: Keith Kee (CEO); Bernard Sim (COO)
- Services: Carsharing; Charging station
- Operating income: ▲S$ 5.2 million (2019)
- Net income: ▼S$ 9.3 million (2019)
- Parent: Goldbell Group
- Website: www.flexar.com.sg

Flexar (officially BlueSG Pte Ltd) is a Singaporean company providing electric car sharing and electric car charging services. The company was originally launched as BlueSG in September 2017, beginning operations in December 2017 with 30 charging stations and 80 all-electric Bolloré Bluecar available via a paid subscription model.

In February 2021, BlueSG was acquired by Goldbell Group, with the acquisition completed in October 2021. Around the same period, its charging network was divested to TotalEnergies. By December 2020, the company had expanded to 374 charging stations and a fleet of 667 vehicles across Singapore.

In August 2025, operations were temporarily suspended, during which the existing fleet was retired and the charging network discontinued. In April 2026, the company relaunched a renewed car-sharing service under the brand name Flexar, while continuing to operate under its legal entity, BlueSG Pte Ltd.

== History ==
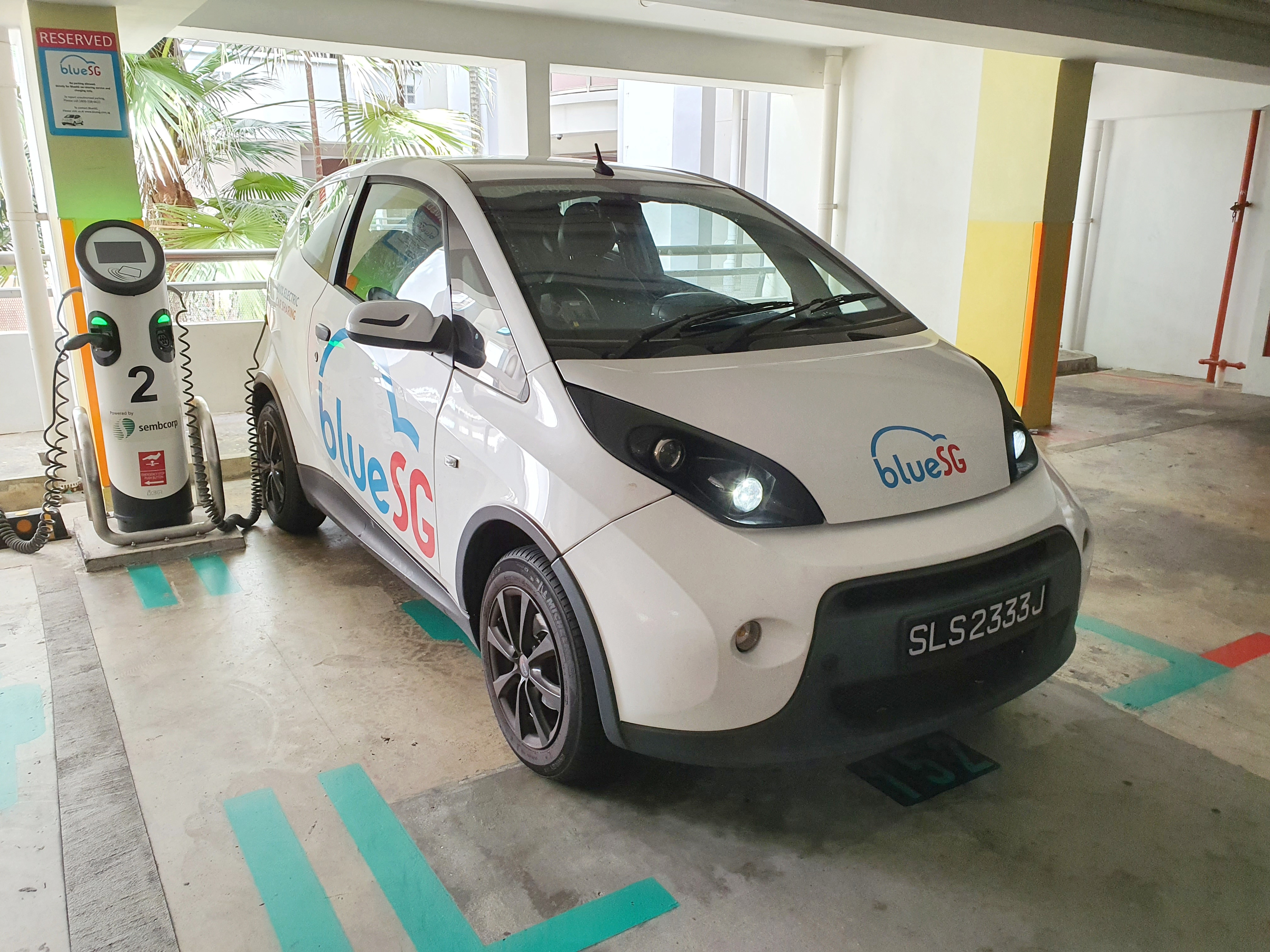
A Bolloré Bluecar parked at a BlueSG charging station in Punggol in 2021.

Logo of blueSG (2017–2025)

=== 2016 - 2017: Bolloré and LTA agreement for an electric car-sharing programme ===
In June 2016, Bolloré signed an agreement with the Land Transport Authority (LTA) and the Economic Development Board to develop an electric car-sharing programme. On 27 September 2017, BlueSG announced with LTA to launch Singapore's first large scale electric car sharing programme, with the service's electric car supplied by Bolloré. The company also opened their Asia-Pacific headquarters for its e-mobility, energy management and system integration business for the region. Bolloré used to operate several similar electric car-sharing services such as Autolib' in Paris, BlueIndy in Indianapolis and Bluecity in London, but failed to achieve scalability and has since ceased to operate in these 3 cities.

Construction of the charging stations began at the end of September 2017 and in December 2017, the service was officially opened to the public with 30 charging stations and 80 cars located throughout the island. BlueSG planned to expand the service to offer 2,000 charging points in 500 charging locations, with 400 charging points open for public use and 1,000 electric cars deployed by 2020. In January 2018, within the first 3 weeks of operations, over 3,000 members signed up for the service, with 5,000 rentals completed.

=== 2018 - 2020: Launch as blueSG ===
In December 2018, it was announced that BlueSG will open its charging stations to privately owned electric vehicles from the first quarter of 2019. The charging service was officially launched in April 2019, with a total of 25 charging stations open to privately owned electric vehicles on a yearly subscription basis.

In April 2019, BlueSG released 99 charging points, which is around 13 per cent of its network of 755 chargers at 191 stations, across 25 locations for public use. It had also promised to release 20 per cent of its projected of 2,000 chargers by 2020.

=== 2021 - 2025: Acquisition by Goldbell and TotalEnergies, temporary suspension ===
In February 2021, Goldbell Group, a Singaporean company, announced it had acquired BlueSG from Bolloré and the acquisition was finalised by October of the same year, after being in discussions since June 2020. According to Singapore's Accounting and Corporate Regulatory Authority, BlueSG has been in a deficit since its launch, with the company making a loss of S$9.3 million in 2019. After the acquisition was completed in October 2021, Goldbell would be investing around S$70 million in the company within the next 5 years to expand BlueSG's services and fleet, with plans to introduce different models of electric vehicles into its fleet and to set up a new research and development centre that will be developing new mobility technologies and algorithms and to expand the service regionally.

On 28 July 2021, it was announced that the network of 1,500 BlueSG charging stations was sold to TotalEnergies, which would continue to operate and maintain the charging stations.

On 4 August 2025, it was announced that BlueSG would pause its car-sharing service from 8 August as part of a major relaunch and the introduction of a new service in 2026, while also laying off a portion of its workforce. BlueSG was criticised for the sudden announcement with only four days' notice, which caught both customers and employees off guard. While the fleet was initially being transferred to Tribecar, another car sharing firm, to be part of its rental fleet, the Land Transport Authority, the regulator, blocked the transfer due to restrictions of the EV Sharing Scheme, which the Bolloré Bluecar inventory was registered under at. Instead, the Bolloré Bluecar inventory was scrapped while Opel Corsa-e cars were sold to used car dealerships. The EV charging network, while operated under TotalEnergies, was shut down on 30 September 2025, with majority of the charging points transferred to other EV charging operators.

=== 2026 - present: Relaunched as Flexar ===
In April 2026, the company announced its return to the car sharing market, offering point-to-point rental services. It would charge customers rental fees, allowing them to return vehicles at specific locations while it managed the top-up of fuel or charging of batteries depending on the vehicle type. The fleet is a mix of electric and combustion engine cars.

The service was officially launched on 4 May 2026, with 200 cars and 100 pick-up/drop-off points.

== Current operations and fleet ==
=== Flexar operations and fleet ===
The service is available to users aged 18 and above who hold a valid Singapore driving licence. It operates as a point-to-point car-sharing system, similar to BlueSG’s previous model. Unlike its predecessor, Flexar does not require a membership fee, and its fleet is not fully electric.

According to the company’s website, rentals are free for the first five minutes. Thereafter, charges are S$0.52 per minute for the next 15 minutes, S$0.49 per minute for the subsequent 20 minutes, S$0.46 per minute for the following 20 minutes, and S$0.44 per minute beyond one hour.

== Former operations and fleet ==
=== BlueSG operations ===
Anyone aged 21 years and above with a valid Singapore driving license, ASEAN driving license or an International driver's permit could sign up for the service through the BlueSG mobile application or their official website. Users could choose between 2 rental plans, with per minute fees of S$0.36 (increased from S$0.33 from 1 March 2021). An available car could be booked through the mobile application or at the charging station itself. A parking space would also be reserved through the application prior to returning the car to the charging station, or users can park at any available lot that is not already reserved.

BlueSG introduced 2 rental packages on 1 October 2019, with the packages originally available for durations of 3 hours and 5 hours rentals respectively, which were only available from Monday to Friday. On 1 March 2021, with per minute fees increased to S$0.36, the prices for the rental packages was also revised and the 5 hour package was replaced with a 4 hours one instead. As of March 2024, the rates for the Corsa-E was revised to S$0.52 per minute, rental packages were also revised to 2 hours and 3 hours only available at different prices for weekdays and weekends, with the 4 hours package removed.

=== Private EV charging service ===
The BlueSG charging service was officially launched in April 2019, with users having to sign up for the charging services through BlueSG's official website and a yearly subscription fee of $20 will be charged in addition to per-minute charging fees of $1 per hour for first 3 hours and $2 per hour subsequently.

=== Fleet ===
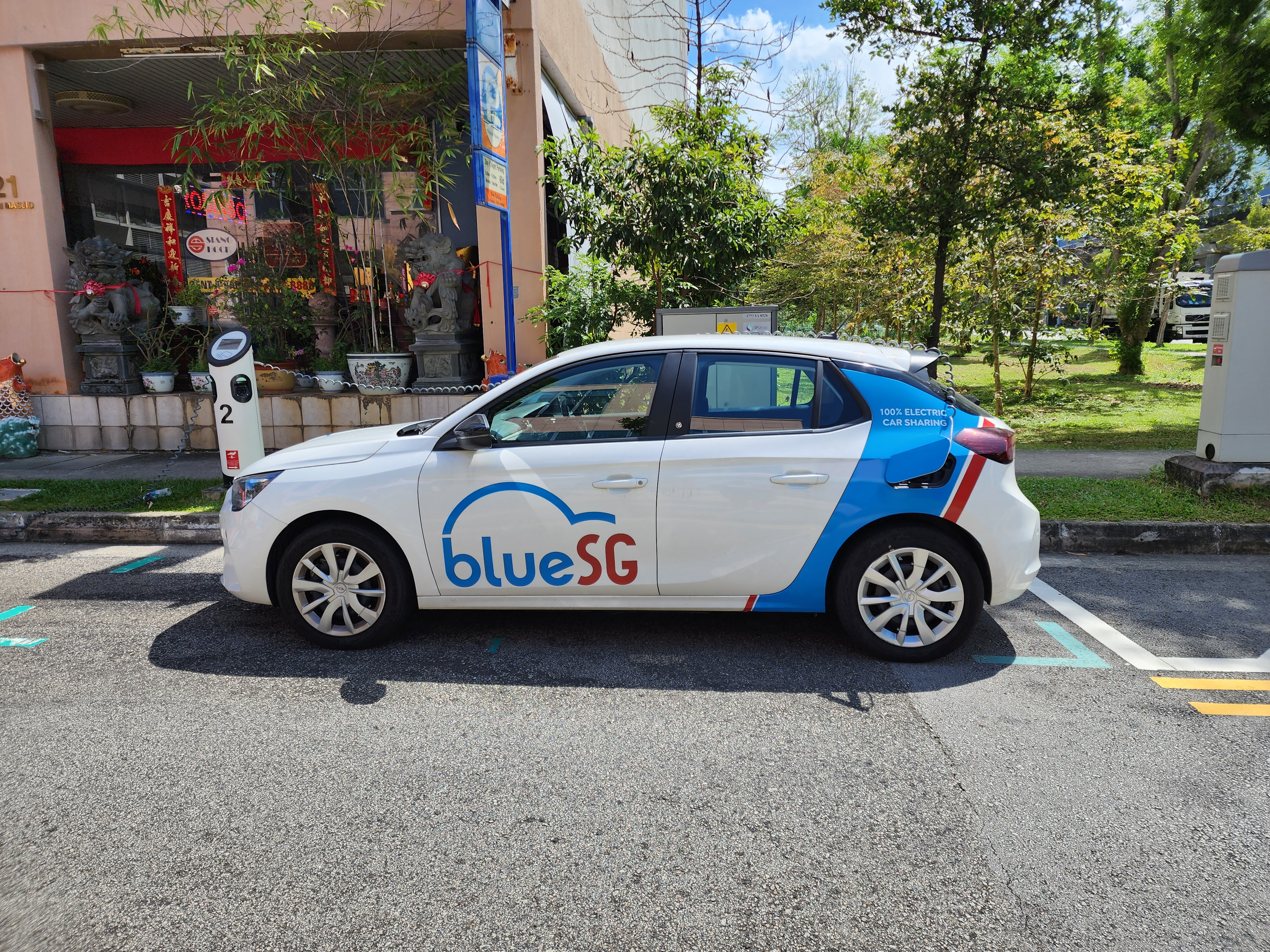
Corsa-e at a Bluesg station in Kembangan, Singapore

The service used the all-electric Bolloré Bluecar, which were adapted to suit Singapore's left-hand traffic. It is a three-door hatchback electric car with four seats and has a 30 kWh lithium metal polymer (LMP) battery, coupled to a supercapacitor, that provides an electric range of 250 km (160 mi) in urban use, and a maximum speed of 120 km/h (75 mph).

The Opel Corsa-e was introduced to the fleet in October 2022. It is a five-door hatchback electric car with five seats and with a 50 kWh lithium-ion battery pack, which has an estimated range of 337 km (209 mi), which is longer than the range of the Bluecar. The car also features fast charging which allows it to be recharged from 10 to 80 percent capacity in 30 minutes, although there are no fast chargers in BlueSG stations.

In July 2023, BlueSG unveiled its latest addition to the fleet, a Singaporean-assembled, "First 100" edition Hyundai Ioniq 5. It is a five-door SUV electric car with five seats and has a 77 kWh lithium-ion battery pack, enabling a maximum driving range of 507 km (315 mi). Being the one and only fleet vehicle of its kind, it features a distinct livery and colour as compared to the rest of the fleet. The car bears the license plate "EVS1L", designating it as the inaugural car among the 100. The car is accessible only via advance reservations and special rental packages, which cost S$90 and S$200 for 6-hour and 24-hour durations respectively.

== Controversies ==
As with most car sharing companies in Singapore, BlueSG has come into the spotlight for its high excess fees against its users in an event of an accident or maintenance issues with the vehicle, including minor ones, with growing calls to regulate the industry and increase consumer protections from such predatory practices.

In 2021, a BlueSG user was charged SG$1,000 for a flat tyre. In 2022, a BlueSG user was charged almost S$10,000 excluding a further third-party charge of S$5,000 to S$8,000 – totaling up to S$18,000 – after the car was damaged from hitting a garbage can.

In 2025, a BlueSG employee was charged for exploiting the system for free rides and for driving without a driving licence on 150 occasions between 2023 and 2024. As a customer service agent, he misused his access to BlueSG's internal database, adjusting rental durations to zero minutes so that he could drive for free. The employee was sentenced to seven months and six weeks imprisonment and was banned from obtaining any driving licence for three years.

== Gallery ==
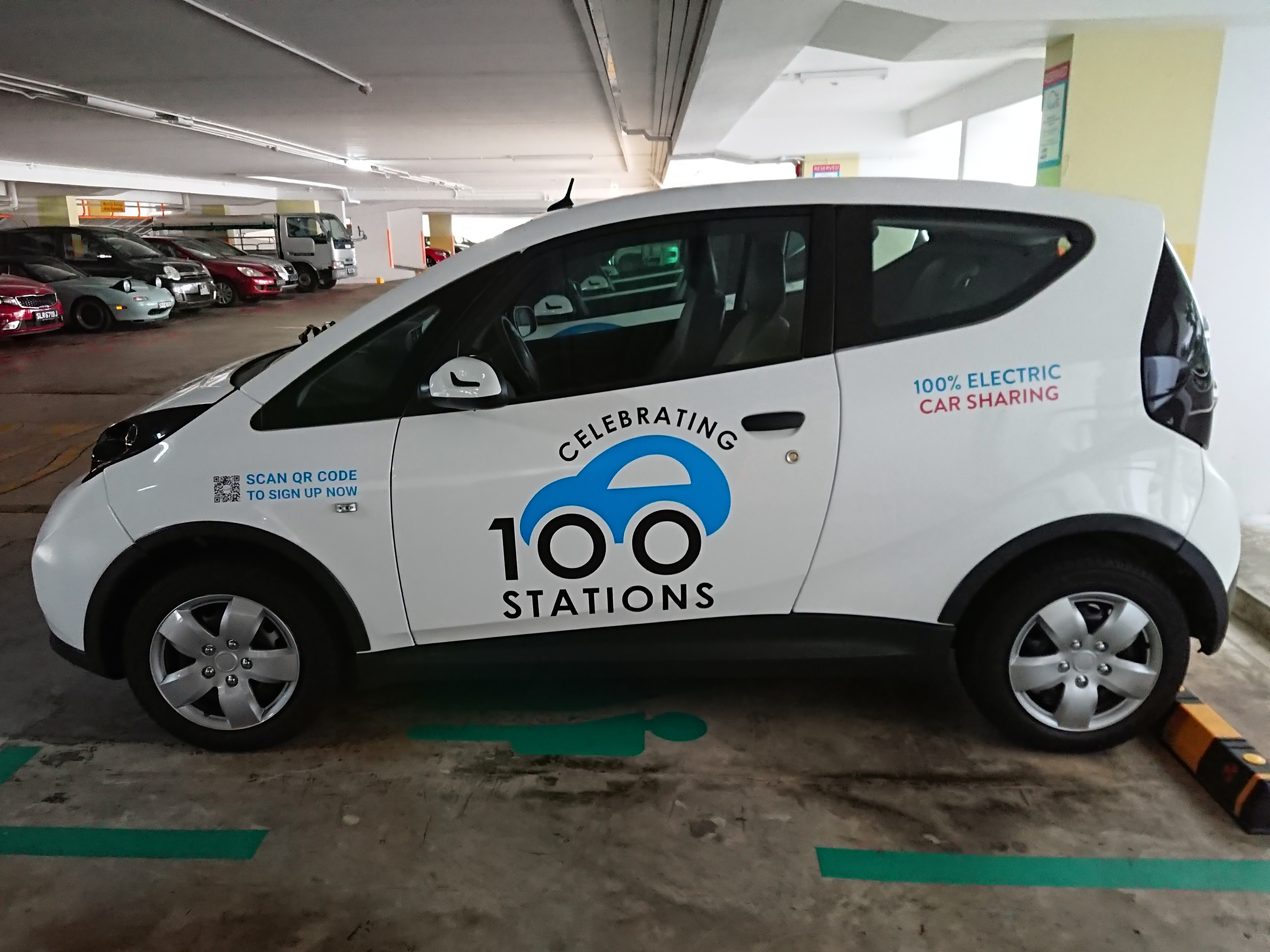
Bluesg Bluecar with the 100 stations celebratory livery.

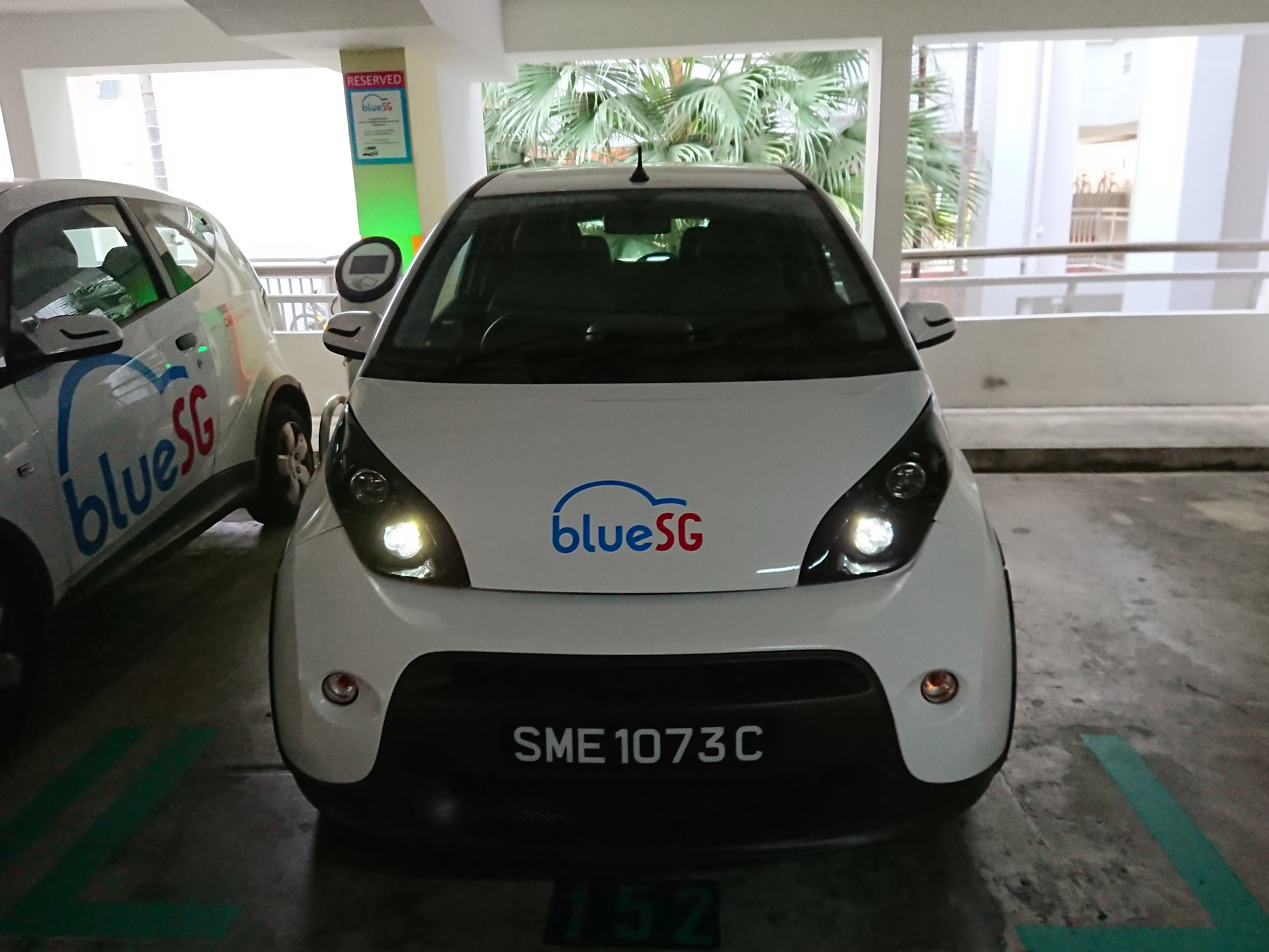
Front view of the Bluecar.

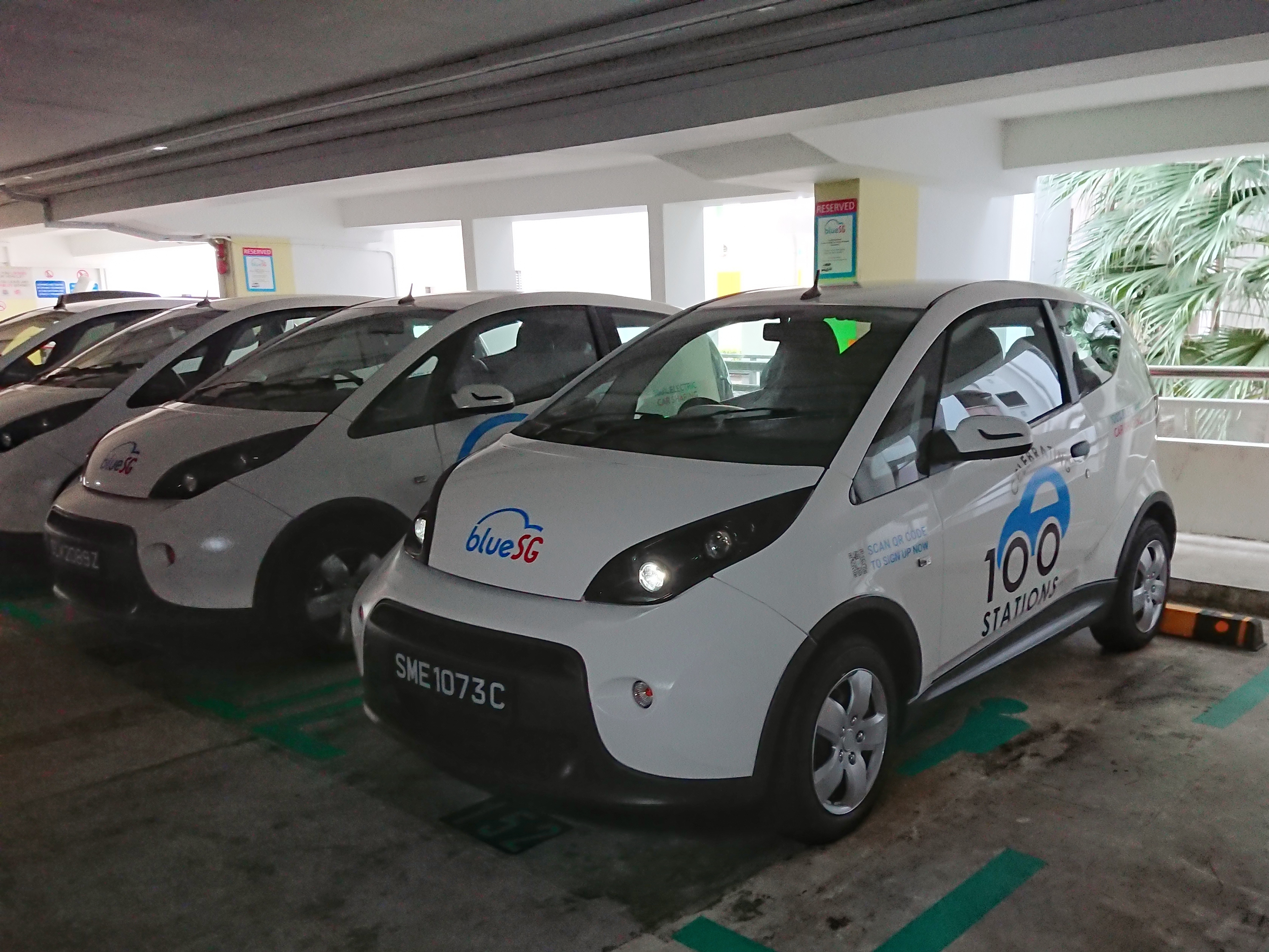
Bluesg Bluecars parked at a station.

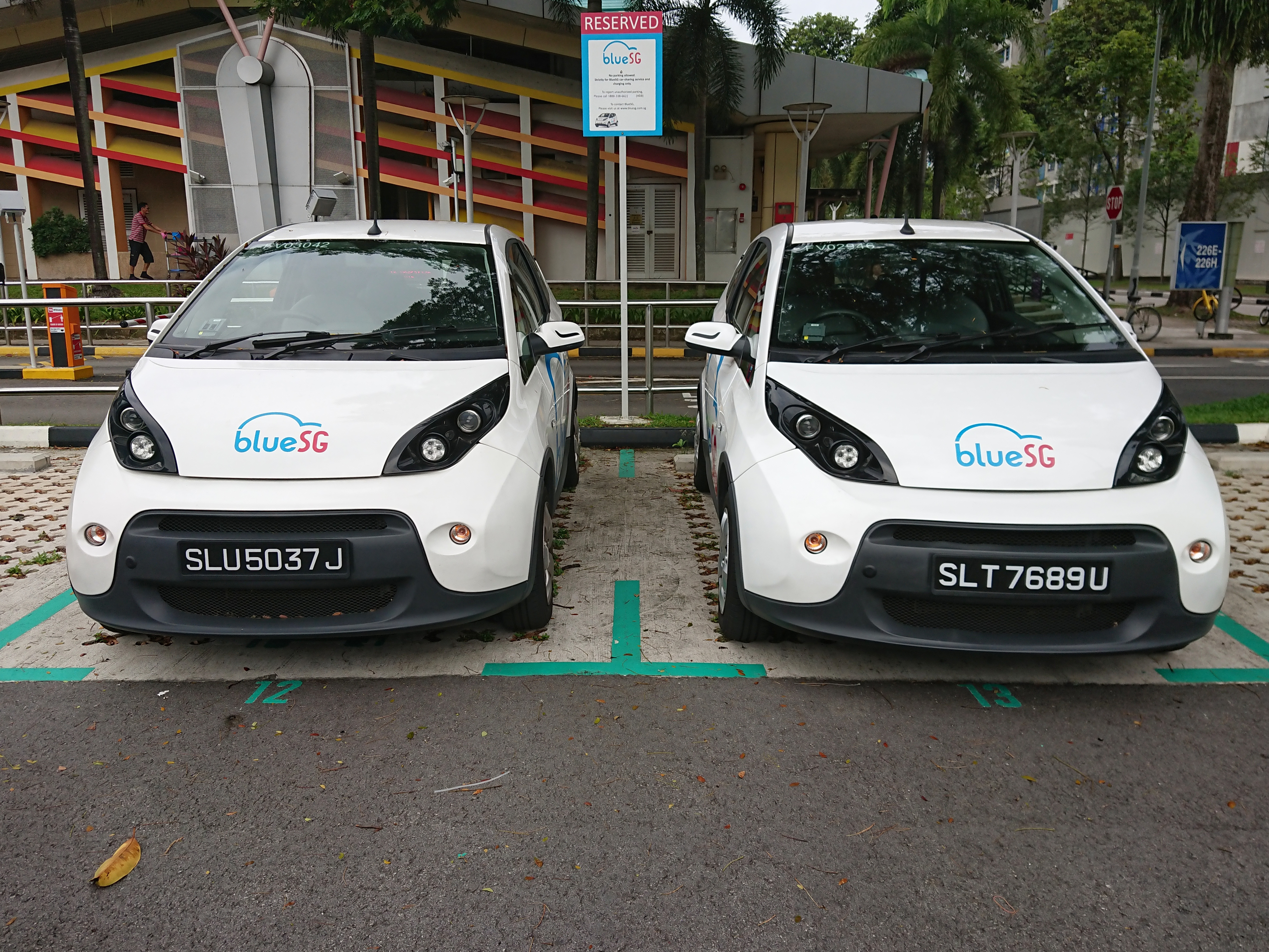
Bluesg station in Ang Mo Kio.

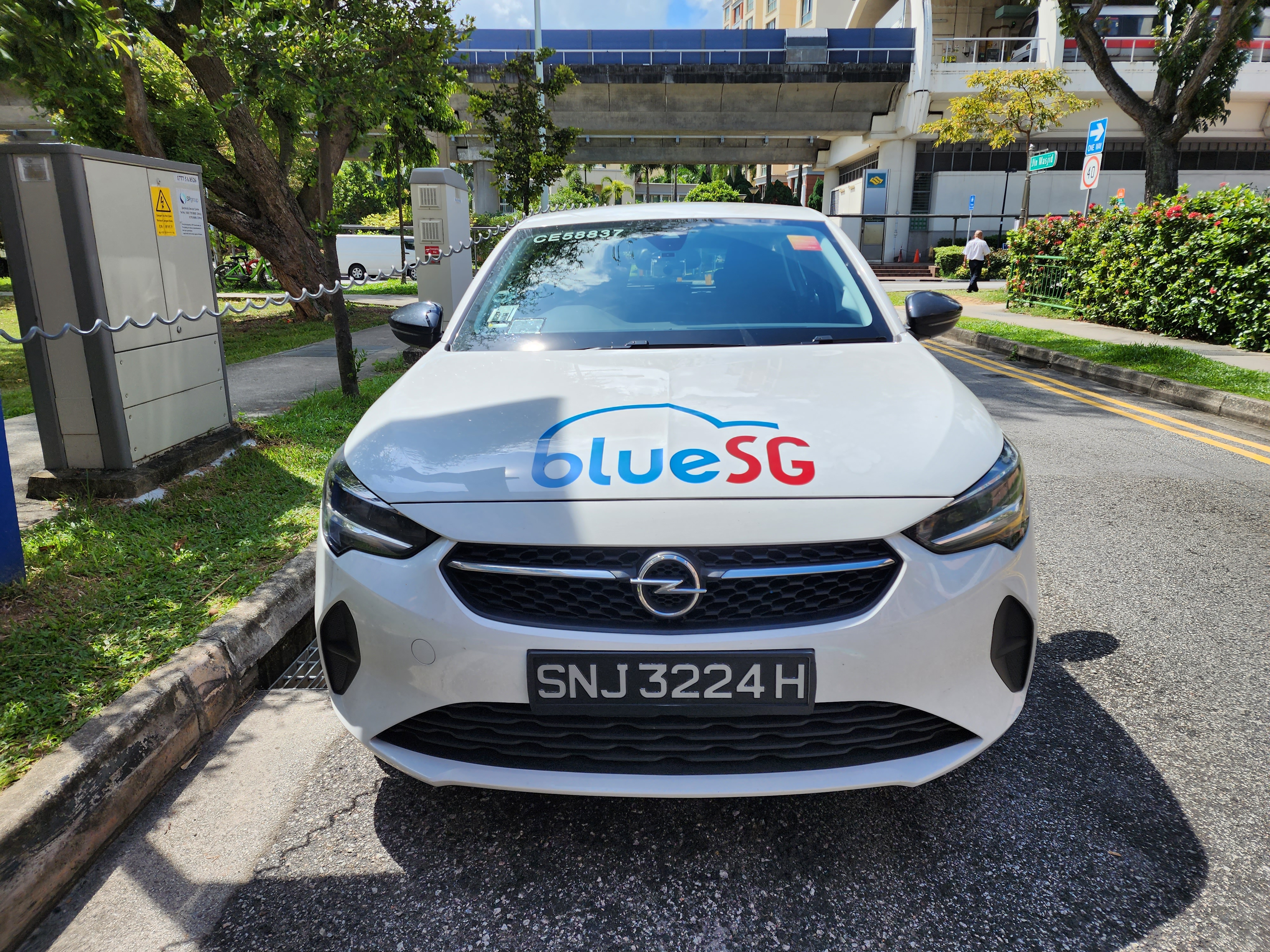
Front view of the Corsa-e.

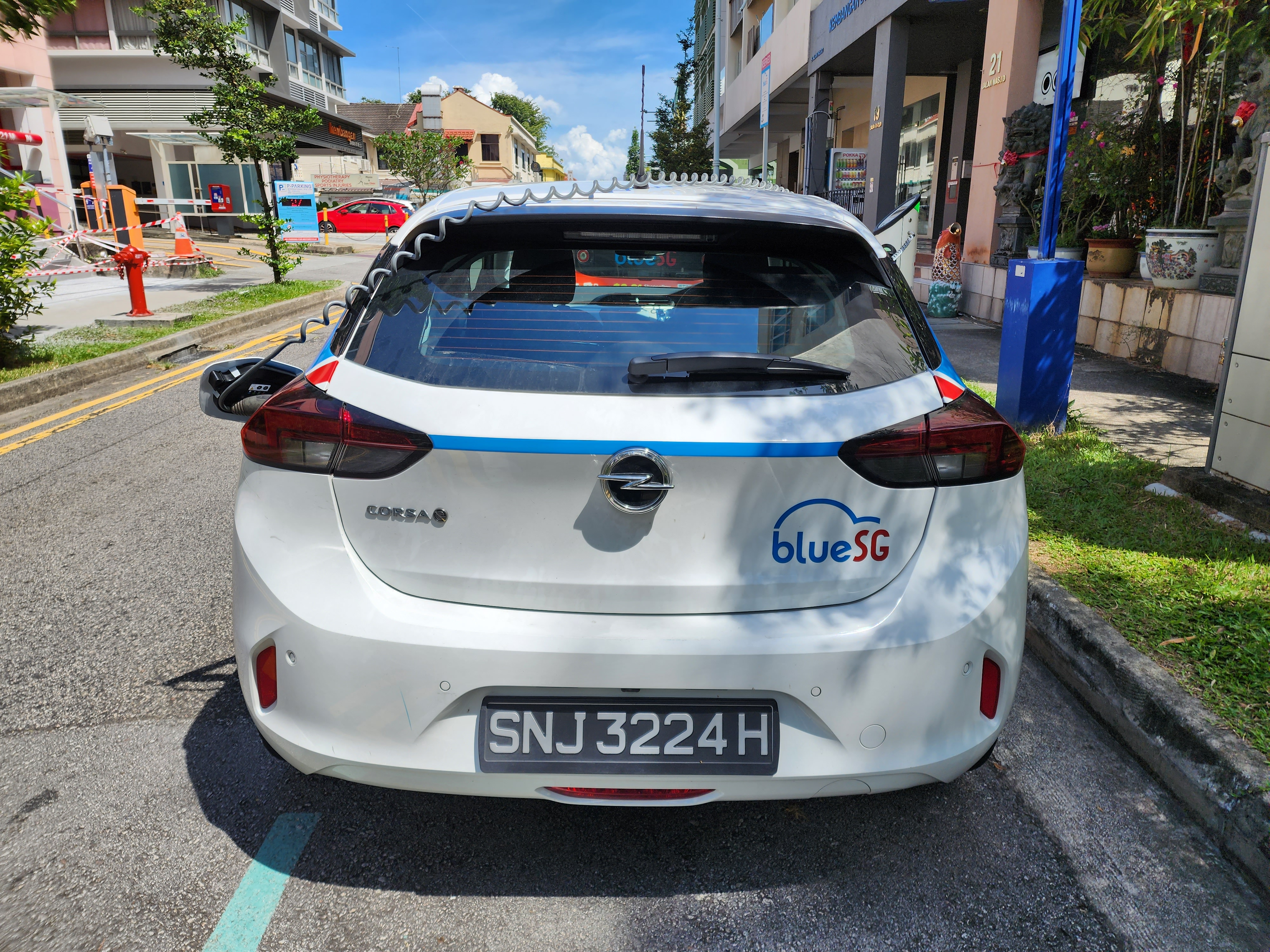
Back view of the Corsa-e.

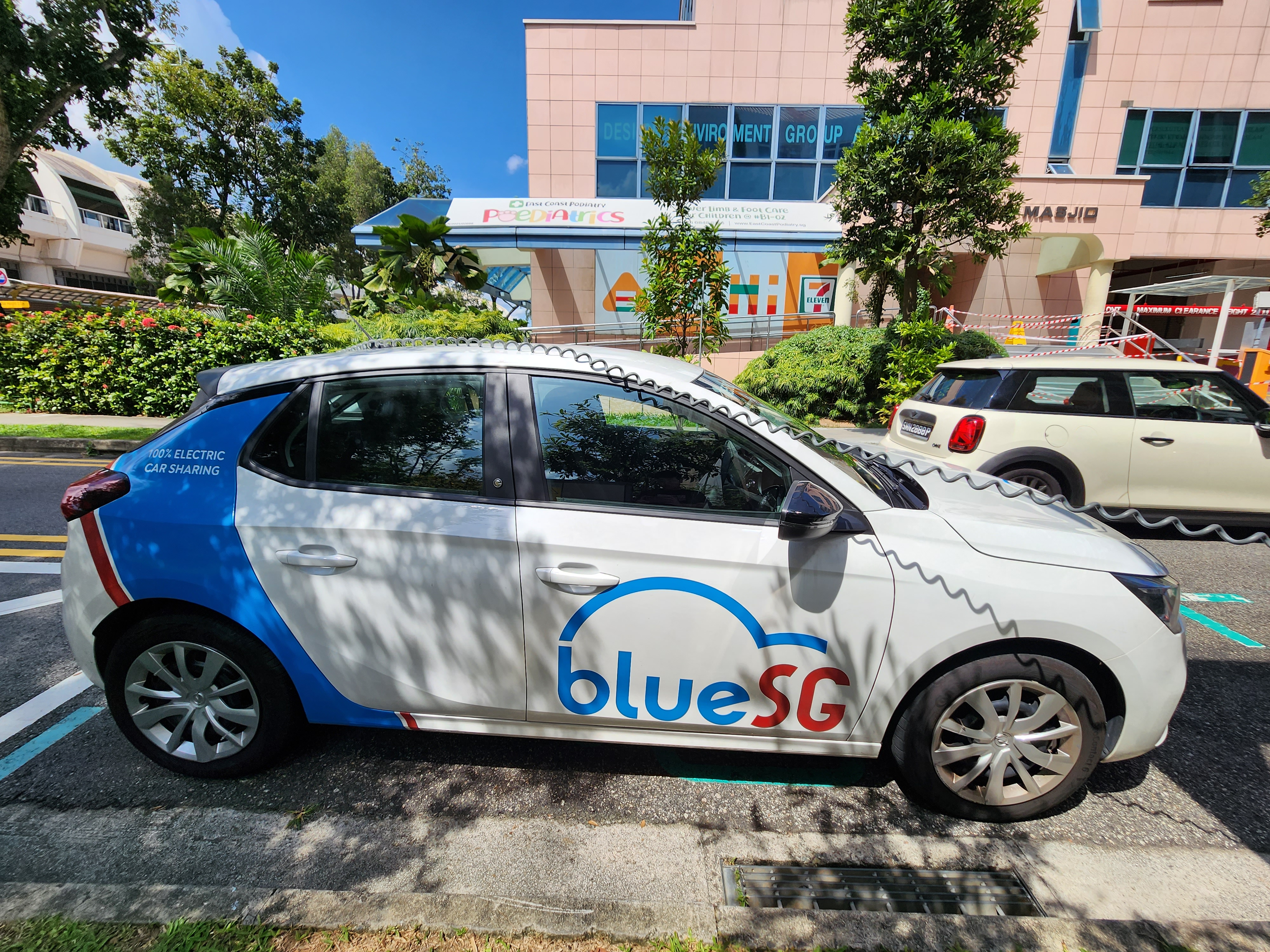
Bluesg Corsa-e parked at a station.

== See also ==
- Autolib'
- Bluecity
- GetGo
