= Bo (surname) =

Bo or Bó as a surname may refer to:

- Achillina Bo, birth name of Lina Bo Bardi (1914–1992), Italian-born Brazilian modernist architect
- Armando Bó (1914–1981), Argentine film actor, director, producer, screenwriter and score composer, father of Víctor Bó
- Armando Bó (screenwriter) (fl. 2010–present), Argentine Oscar-winning screenwriter and film director, son of Víctor Bó
- Carlo Bo (1911–2001), Italian politician and IULM founder
- Charles Maung Bo (born 1948), Burmese cardinal and current archbishop of the Roman Catholic Archdiocese of Yangon
- Conrad Bo (born 1972), South African artist and founder of The Superstroke Art Movement
- Eddie Bo (1930–2009), American singer and pianist
- Jørgen Bo (1919–1999), Danish architect, Royal Danish Academy of Fine Arts professor
- Lars Bo (1924–1999), Danish artist and writer
- Lisa del Bo, Belgian singer born Reinhilde Goossens in 1961
- Mario Bò (1912–2003), Italian footballer
- Morten Bo (born 1945), Danish photographer
- Theinkha Bo (13th Century), Burmese Prince of Binnaka
- Víctor Bó (born 1943), Argentine actor and film producer, son of Armando Bó

== See also ==
- Daniel Dal Bo (born 1987), Argentine sprint canoeist
- Marcial Di Fonzo Bo (born 1968), Argentine actor and theatre director
- Bő (genus), Hungarian medieval clan
- Bø (disambiguation), which includes people with the surname
- Beau (name), given name and surname
