= Boh (surname) =

Boh is a surname with multiple origins. Notable people with the surname include:

- Aaron Boh (born 1974), Canadian ice hockey player
- Alex Kinvi-Boh (born 1991), Togolese footballer
- Katja Boh (1929–2008), Slovenian sociologist and politician
- Rick Boh (born 1964), Canadian ice hockey player
