= Bolloré Bluecar =

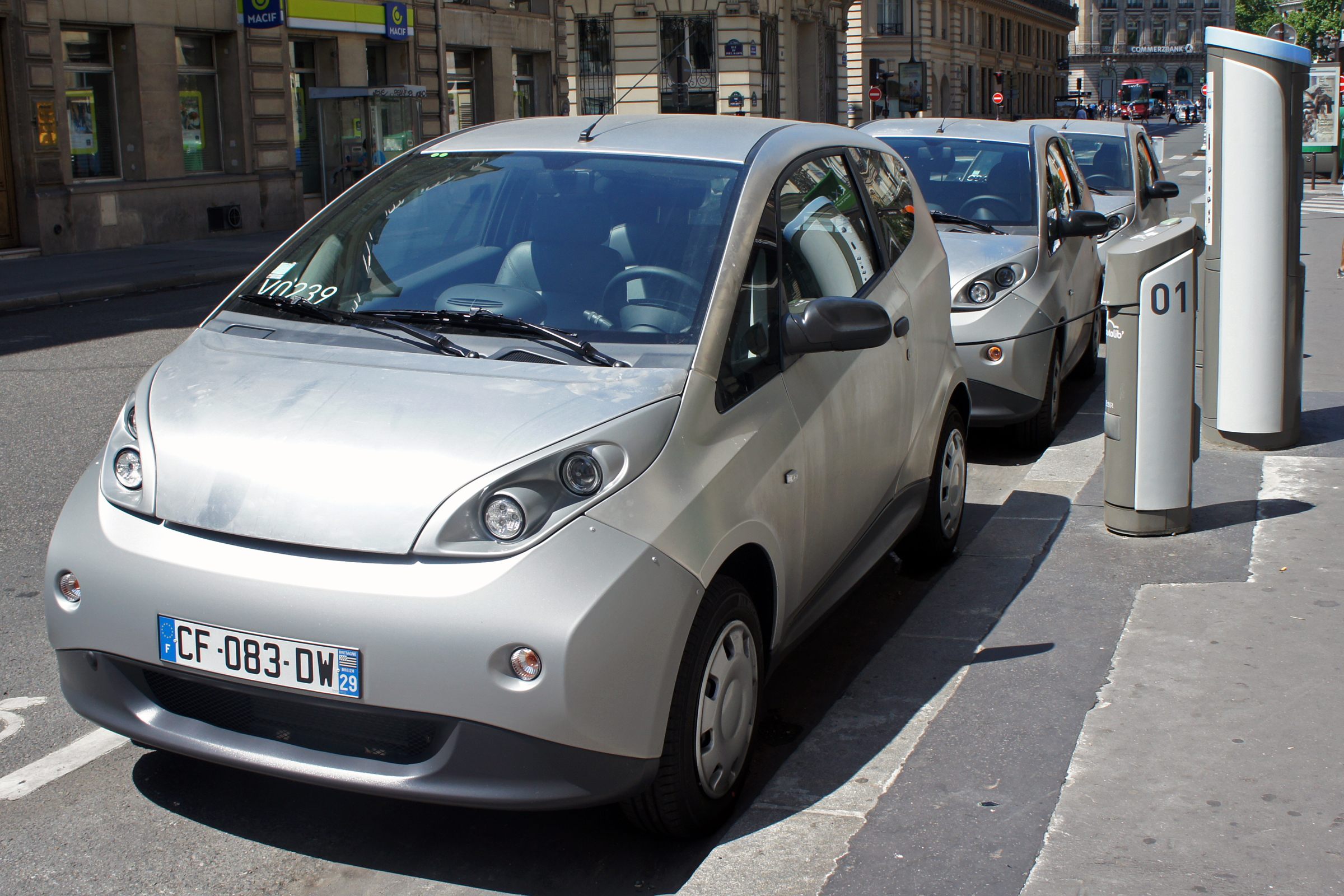
- Bolloré Bluecar in Paris

Overview
- Manufacturer: Véhicule Électriques Pininfarina Bolloré
- Production: 2011–present
- Assembly: France: Dieppe (Automobiles Alpine; 2015-present); Italy: Bairo (Cecomp; 2011-2015)
- Designer: Lowie Vermeersch at Pininfarina

Body and chassis
- Class: City car (A)
- Body style: 3-door
- Layout: FF layout

Powertrain
- Electric motor: 50 kW (68 PS; 67 bhp) Electric
- Transmission: None
- Battery: 30 kWh lithium polymer (LMP) battery
- Electric range: 250 km (160 mi) in urban use; 150 km (93 mi) on the highway

Dimensions
- Wheelbase: 2,500 mm (98.4 in)
- Length: 3,300 mm (129.9 in)
- Width: 1,720 mm (67.7 in)
- Height: 1,610 mm (63.4 in)
- Kerb weight: 1,070 kg (2,359 lb)

The Bolloré Bluecar is a small four-seat, three-door electric car supplied by Bolloré, designed by Pininfarina and manufactured by Cecomp in Bairo, Italy, under a joint venture owned by Bolloré and Pininfarina called Véhicule Électriques Pininfarina Bolloré (VEPB). The car has a 30kWh lithium metal polymer (LMP) battery, coupled to a supercapacitor, that provides an electric range of 250 km (160 mi) in urban use, and a maximum speed of 120 km/h (75 mph).

Originally shown as the Pininfarina B0 concept car in 2008, the production version was launched in 2011 with the first 250 production version Bluecars deployed as part of the Autolib' carsharing program in Paris on December 5, 2011. In October 2012, the Bluecar first became available to retail customers through leasing, and sales began in February 2013 at a price of €19,000 plus a monthly fee of €80 for the batteries. As of September 2016, a total of 5,689 units had been registered in France, most of which are in service for the Autolib' program. The Bolloré Bluecar was the top selling highway-capable electric car in that country in 2012.

In 2014, Bolloré entered into a 70/30 joint venture with Renault to manufacture a three-seat version of the Bluecar from the second half of 2015.

== History ==
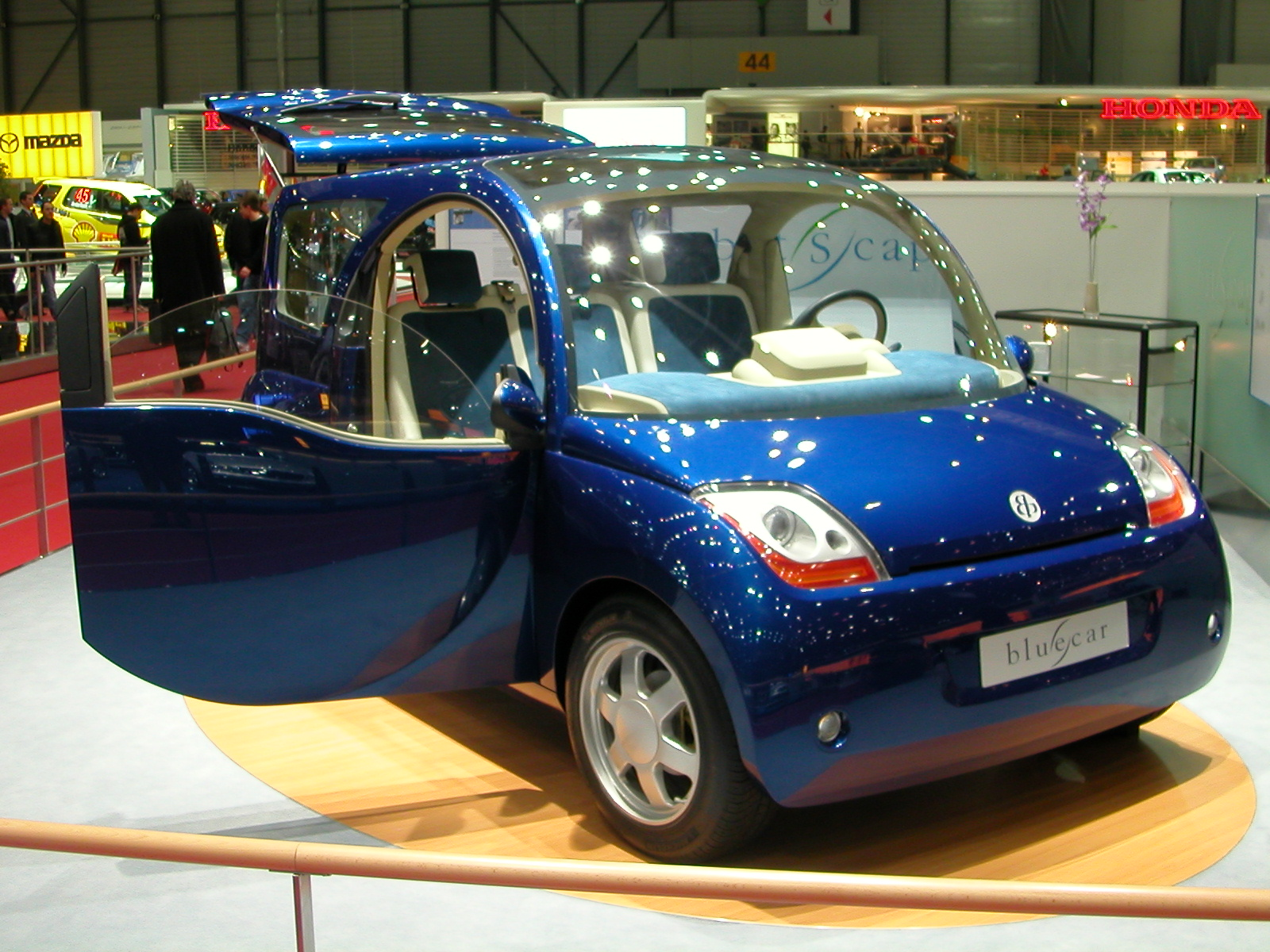
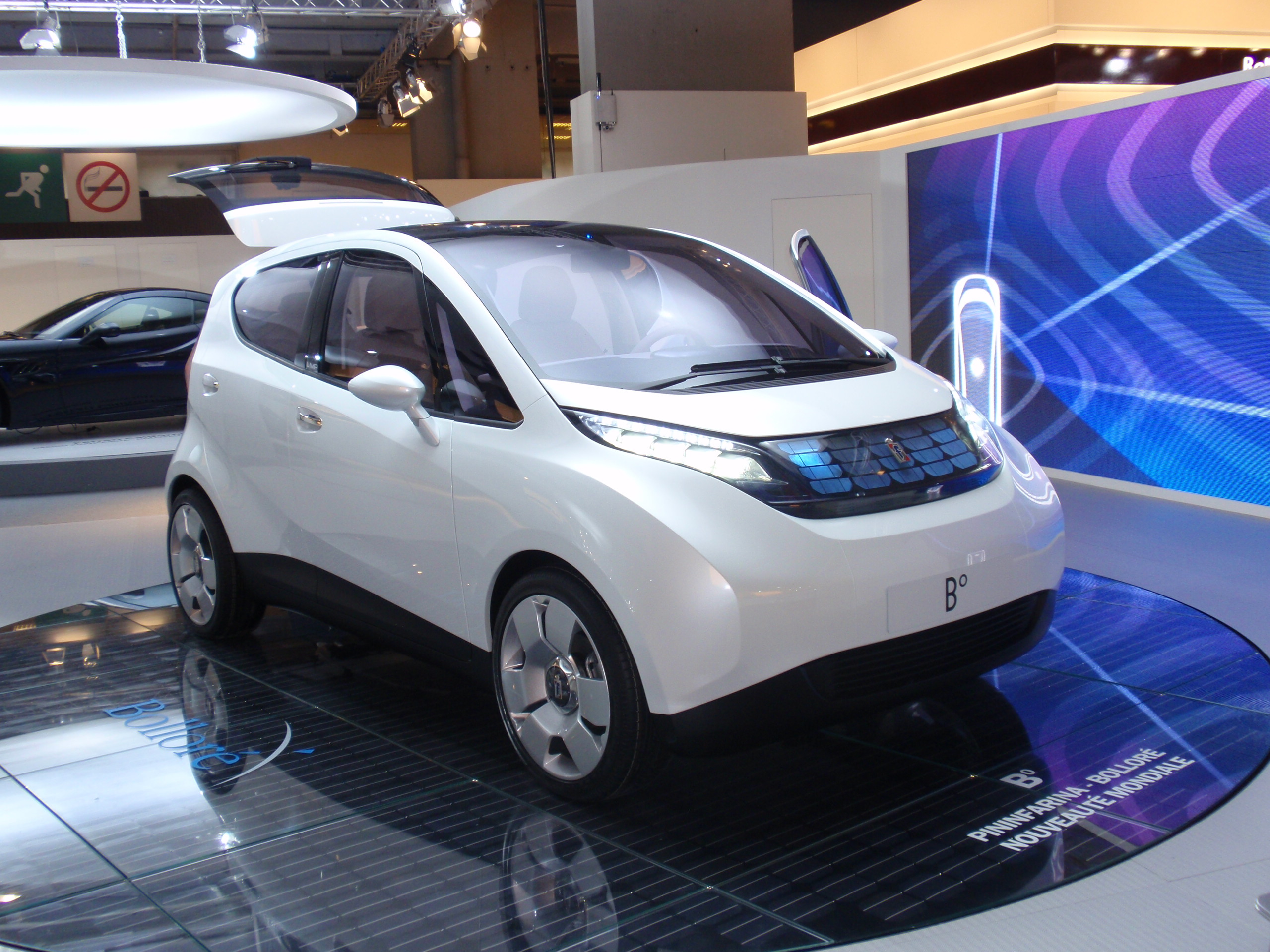
The Bolloré BlueCar concept exhibited at the 2006 Geneva Motor Show (left) and the Pininfarina-Bolloré B0 concept car exhibited at the 2008 Paris Motor Show (right).

=== Bolloré Bluecar concept ===
The Bolloré Group, through its subsidiary BatScap, presented the Bluecar EV, a road-ready prototype, at the 2005 Geneva Auto Show. The company intended to showcase the potential of the company's lithium-ion battery technology. The BlueCar concept car used a 30 kW electric motor powered by a 28 kWh lithium-ion battery pack positioned at the centre of the car under the seats and in front of the rear axle.

=== Pininfarina B0 concept ===
The Pininfarina B0 (B Zero) is a concept electric car designed by Pininfarina in collaboration with Bolloré, which was introduced at the 2008 Paris Motor Show.

The car incorporates a lithium metal polymer battery matched up with a supercapacitor developed by Bolloré's subsidiary Batscap in the original 2005 concept Bluecar. The energy storage component not only allows for high regenerative braking and acceleration capabilities but also extends the life of the battery. A range of 250 km and a top speed of 130 km/h have been announced for the vehicle, as well as 0–60 km/h acceleration time of 6.3 seconds.

== Production version ==
Following the 2005 version of the Bluecar, the new Bluecar project was developed by the Pininfarina Design department, led by the Flemish designer Lowie Vermeersch, who had previously coordinated other projects such as the Pininfarina Sintesi and the Ferrari California. The car was dedicated to the memory of Andrea Pininfarina, who died two months before its unveiling and who was a firm believer in the project.

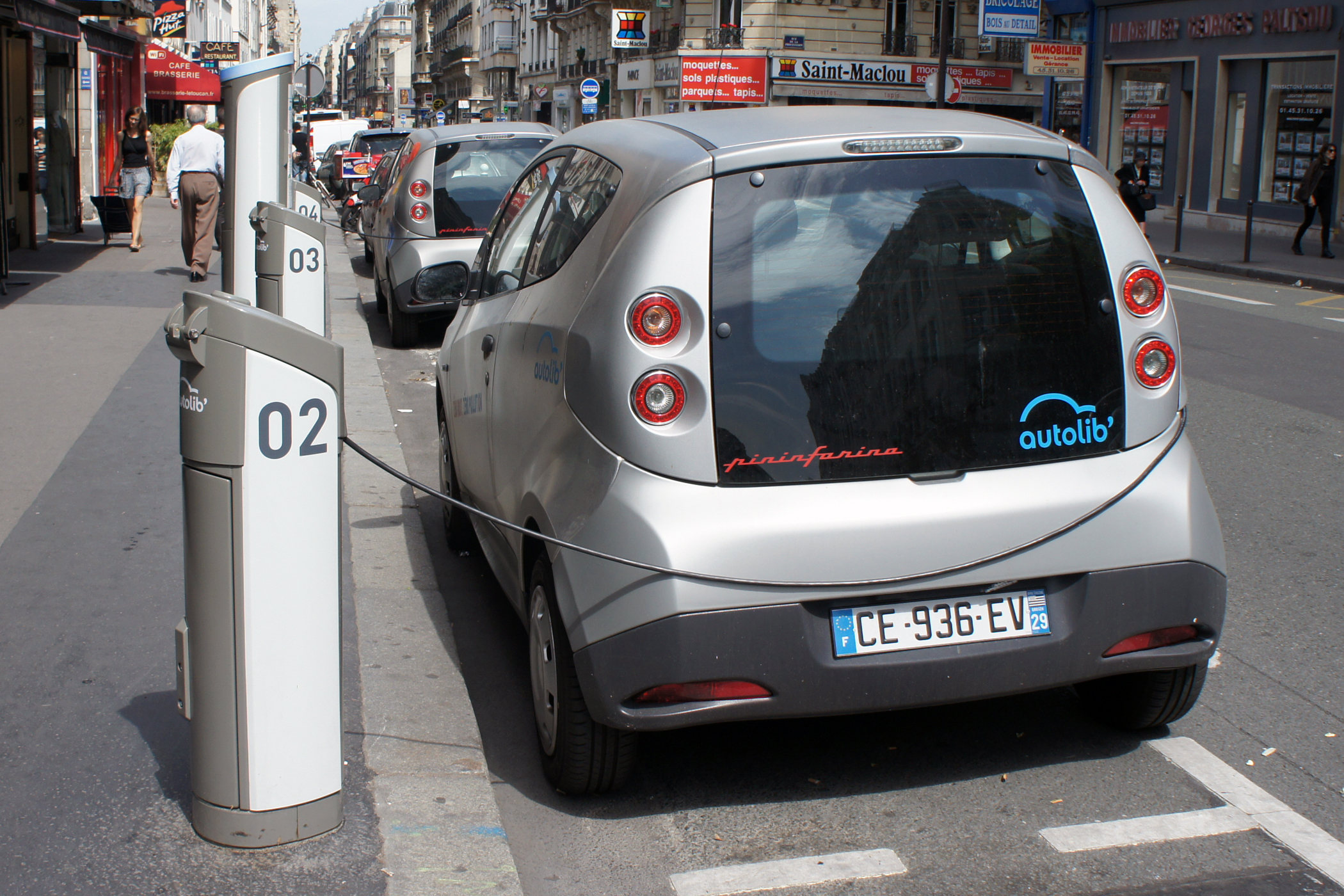
Bolloré Bluecars charging at an Autolib' kiosk on Rue de Vaugirard, Paris

The main differences between the production Bluecar and the B0 concept car is in the detail design. The production version is launched as a three-door compared to the B0's five-door design. The photovoltaic roof was omitted and the front and rear lights and interior dashboard are simplified.

Sales

A total of 399 Bluecars were registered in France in 2011, 1,543 during 2012. The Bolloré Bluecar was the top selling highway-capable electric car in the French market in 2012, and represented 27% of electric cars registered in the country during that year. Cumulative sales in France totaled 5,689 units by the end of September 2016, with over 2,000 units deployed in the Autolib' carsharing program.

=== Specifications ===
The Bluecar is a three-door hatchback electric car with four seats. Both the retail and Autolib' versions share the same drivetrain specification. The electric car has a 30 kWh lithium metal polymer battery located under the passenger seats, coupled to a supercapacitor, that provides an electric range of 250 km (160 mi) in the city and 150 km (93 mi) on the highway at a maximum power of 50 kW. The maximum speed is 130 km/h (81 mph) and the battery weighs 300 kg (660 lb). The batteries are made in Bolloré owned facilities in two locations, one in Brittany, France and the other in Montreal, Quebec, Canada.

Bolloré is unique in integrating solid-state batteries into production vehicles. The LMP batteries consist of a laminate of four ultra-thin materials: (1) metallic lithium foil anode that acts as both a lithium source and a current collector; (2) solid polymeric electrolyte created by dissolving a lithium salt in a solvating co-polymer (polyoxyethylene); (3) cathode composed of vanadium oxide, carbon, and polymer to form a plastic composite; and (4) aluminium foil current collector.

== Markets and sales ==
=== Car sharing programs ===
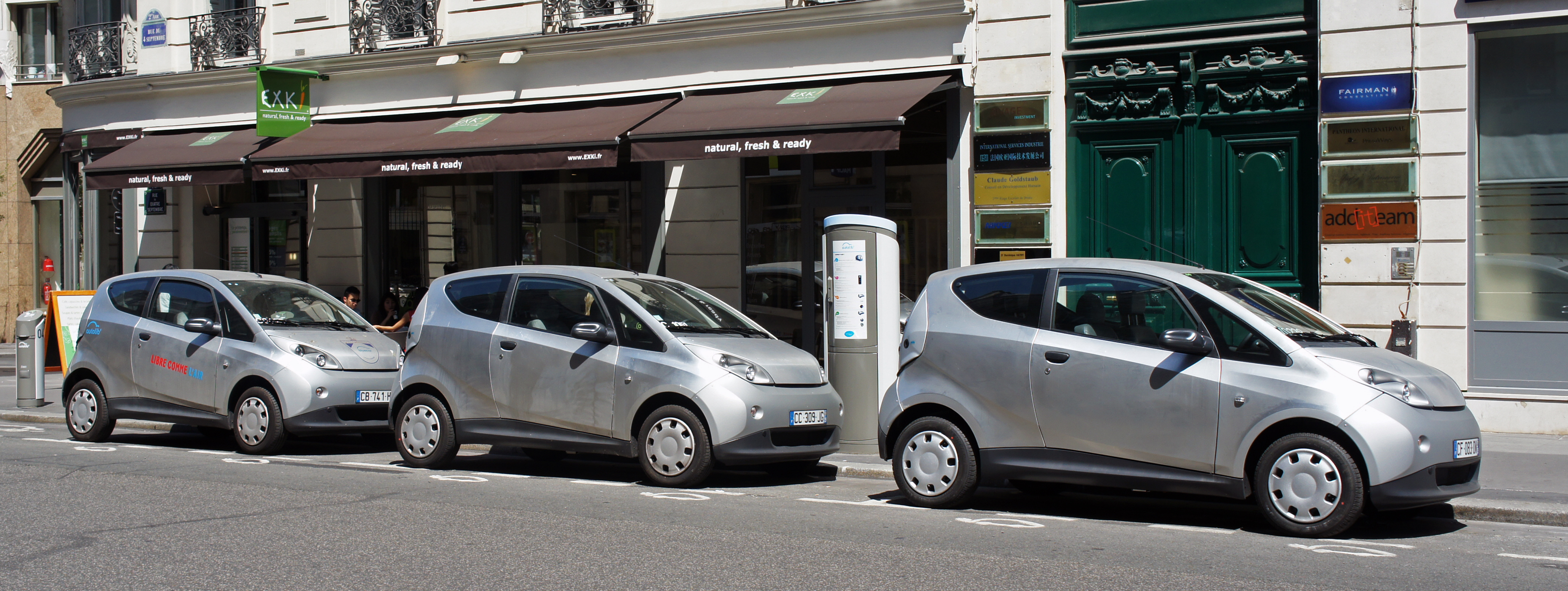
Three Bolloré Bluecars charging at an Autolib' Station on Rue du Quatre Septembre, Paris

The first Bluecar electric cars were delivered for the Autolib' carsharing program. Bolloré won the contract to deploy these electric cars together with 1,120 stations with parking and charging stations. A total of 66 Bluecars were deployed for the two-month trial period that began in October 2011, and service began on December 5, 2011, with 250 Bluecars available to the public, and rising to 1,000 cars by early March 2012, and about 2,000 units by September 2013.

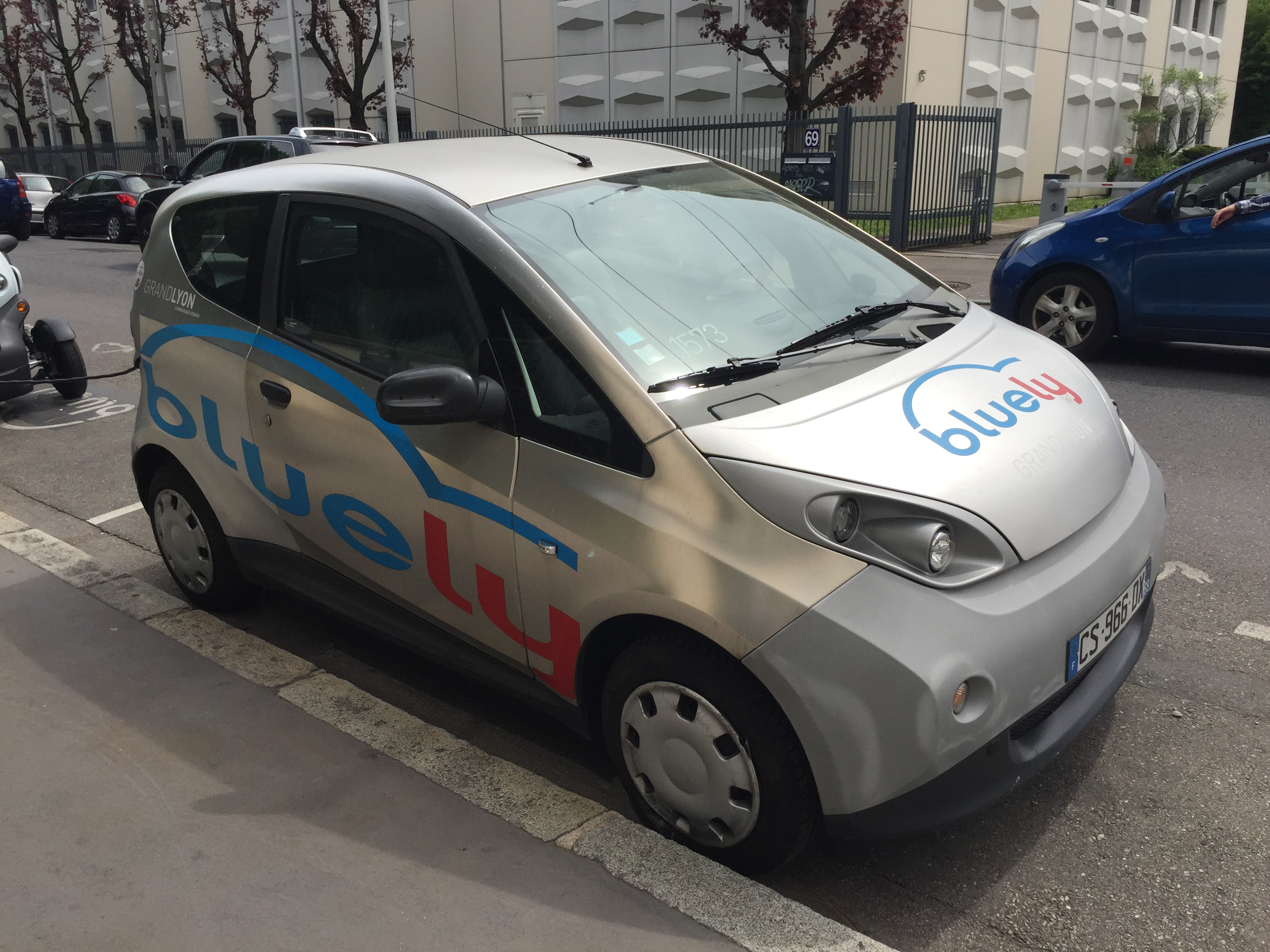
Bluecar in service for the Bluely scheme in Lyon

By early 2013 in France, the Bolloré Group announced plans to launch a similar carsharing service in Lyon, and Bordeaux, but under a different brand name (Bluely in Lyon and Bluecub in Bordeaux) with no cost to the cities. Bolloré's proposal is to fund the entire infrastructure, install and provide the vehicles, and cover the costs of maintenance and repairs. After these two schemes are implemented, the company plans to launch similar systems abroad beginning with a city in Asia. The Bluely began service in October 2013 with an initial fleet of 130 vehicles and 51 parking and charging stations. The BlueCub, began operating in January 2014 with an initial fleet of 90 vehicles, 40 parking stations and 180 charging stations.

In May 2014 in the US, the Bluecars were showcased to the public in Indianapolis for a public car-sharing program called BlueIndy. The carsharing service was opened to the public in September 2015. BlueIndy began with 25 charging stations and 50 all-electric Bluecars around the city at launch. The Bluecars operated by the BlueIndy service were adapted to meet American regulations from the French version. In addition, the models used in the U.S. have air conditioning and more airbags, also size is slightly bigger and have more weight. The U.S. models have a range of about 195 km (120 miles) and a top speed of 115 km/h (70 mph). Over 500 members signed up for annual subscriptions during the first month of operation. By the end of June 2016 there were 230 Bluecars in operation with 74 pick-up/drop off sites, each with five charging stations. The membership totaled 2,100 registered members, and never exceeded 3,000, despite $7 million in subsidies from Indianapolis and from Indianapolis Power & Light.

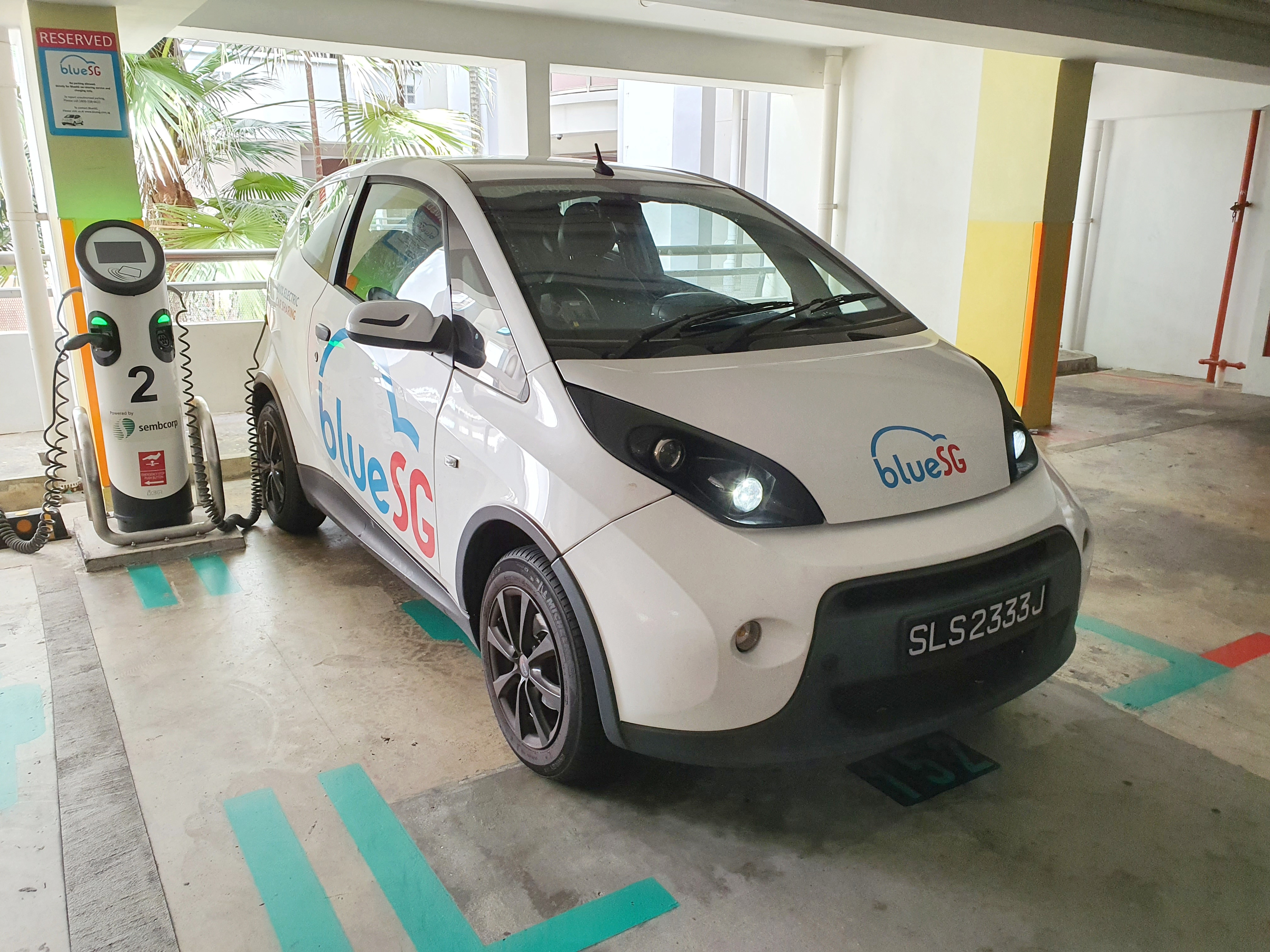
A Bolloré Bluecar parked at a BlueSG charging station in Singapore.

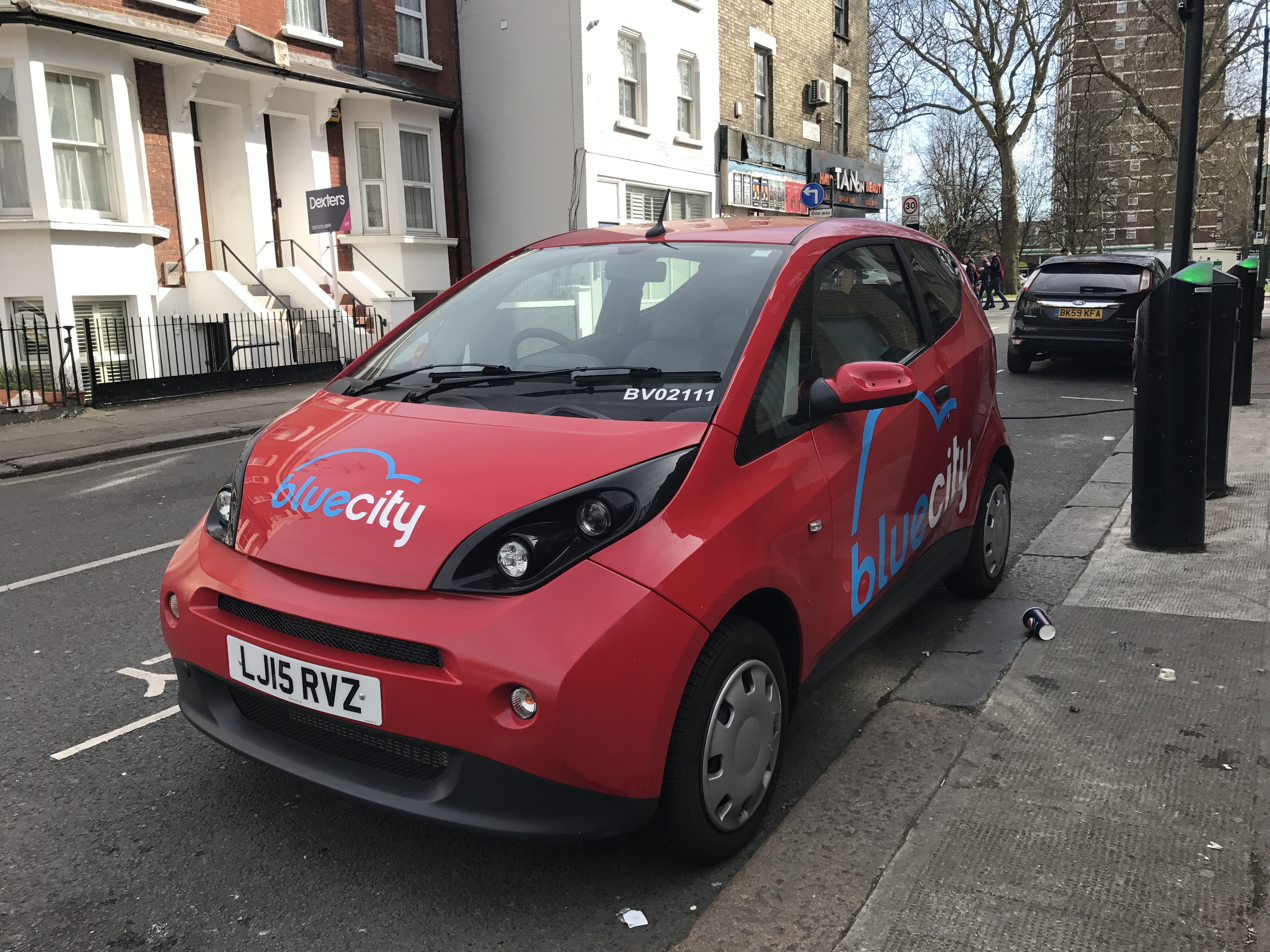
A Bolloré Bluecar by Bluecity parked in London

In 2017, Bluecity, BlueLA and BlueSG began operations in London, Los Angeles and Singapore respectively. The service in Los Angeles started as a program targeted at low-income people and achieved relative success in their pilot program. In 2019, BlueLA secured US$3 million to expand their services within the city. In Singapore, under an agreement with Singapore's Land Transport Authority (LTA) and the Economic Development Board, the aim of introducing the electric car program was to reduce the car population and also carbon emissions in the city-state. Within the first 3 weeks of operations, over 3000 members signed up for the BlueSG, with 5000 rentals completed.

Autolib', BlueIndy and BlueCity ceased operations in 2018, 2019 and 2020 respectively, citing failure to achieve scalability in the respective cities that they operated in. In February 2021, Goldbell Group, a Singaporean company, announced it had acquired BlueSG from Bolloré and the acquisition was finalised by October of the same year, after being in discussions since June 2020. According to Singapore's Accounting and Corporate Regulatory Authority, BlueSG has been in a deficit since its launch, with the company making a loss of S$9.3 million in 2019. While in July 2021, BlueSG's network of 1,500 charging stations was sold to TotalEnergies, which would continue to operate and maintain the charging stations.

=== Retail version ===
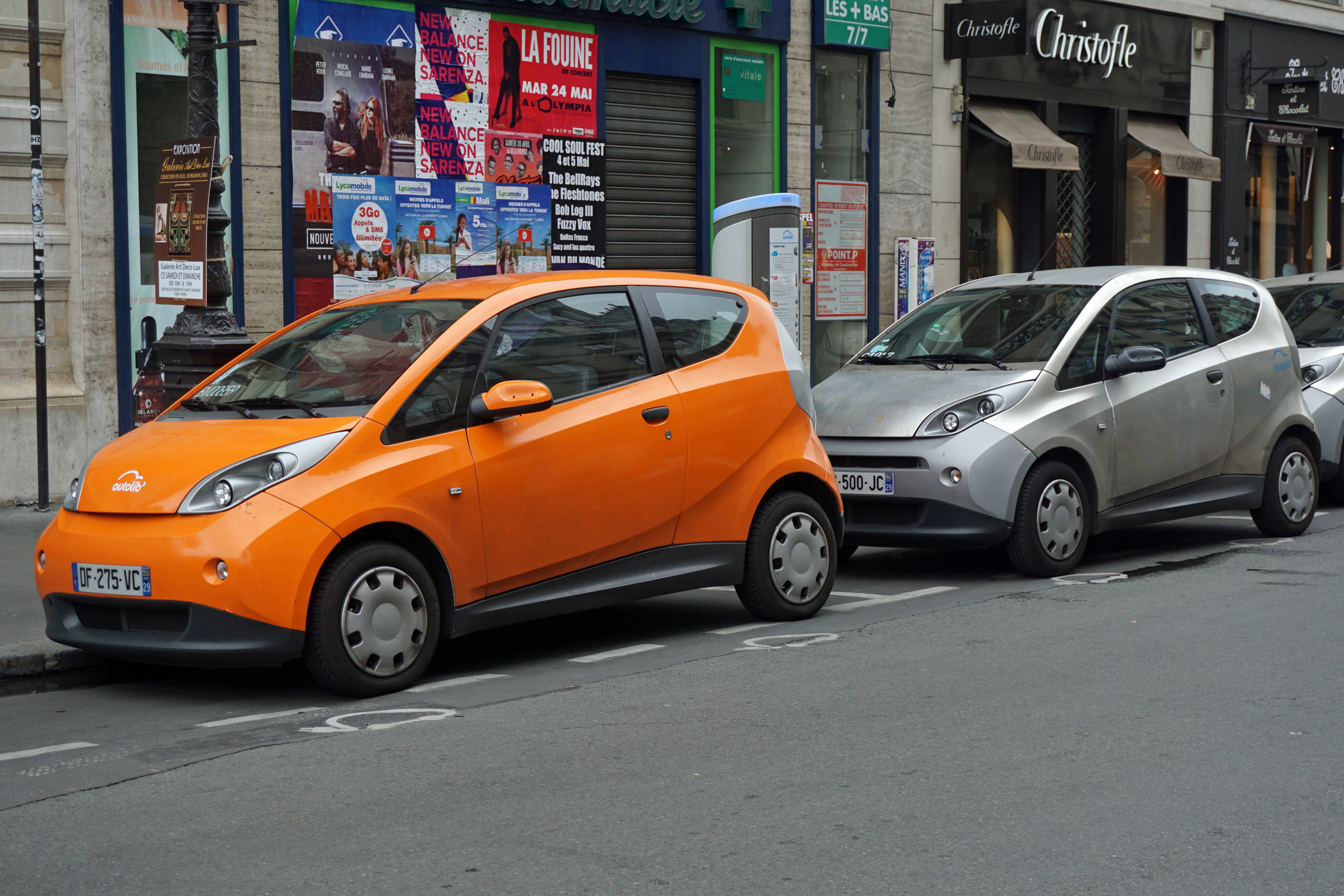
Bluecars at the Autolib' charging station near Palais Garnier

Leasing to individual and corporate customers began in October 2012 and is limited to the Île-de-France area. The Bluecar is available at a rate of €500 (US$648) per month, with a minimum contract for 3 months and a maximum of 20 months. The pricing includes insurance, charging in the Autolib' stations and parking. The retail version shares the same design and specification but has several differences with the vehicles deployed for Autolib, particularly its blue exterior color, unlike the Autolib' version's silver unpainted aluminum exterior.

In February 2013, Bolloré announced it was discontinuing the leasing program and began retail sales of the Bluecar starting at a price of €19,000 (US$24,850) before the value added tax and the €7,000 government bonus, plus a monthly fee of €80 (US$105) for the batteries. Bolloré also offers an optional package for the installation of a wall-box home charging station for €995 (US$1,300), and for an optional monthly fee of €15 (US$20), owners can have access to the Autolib' network of charging stations around Paris.

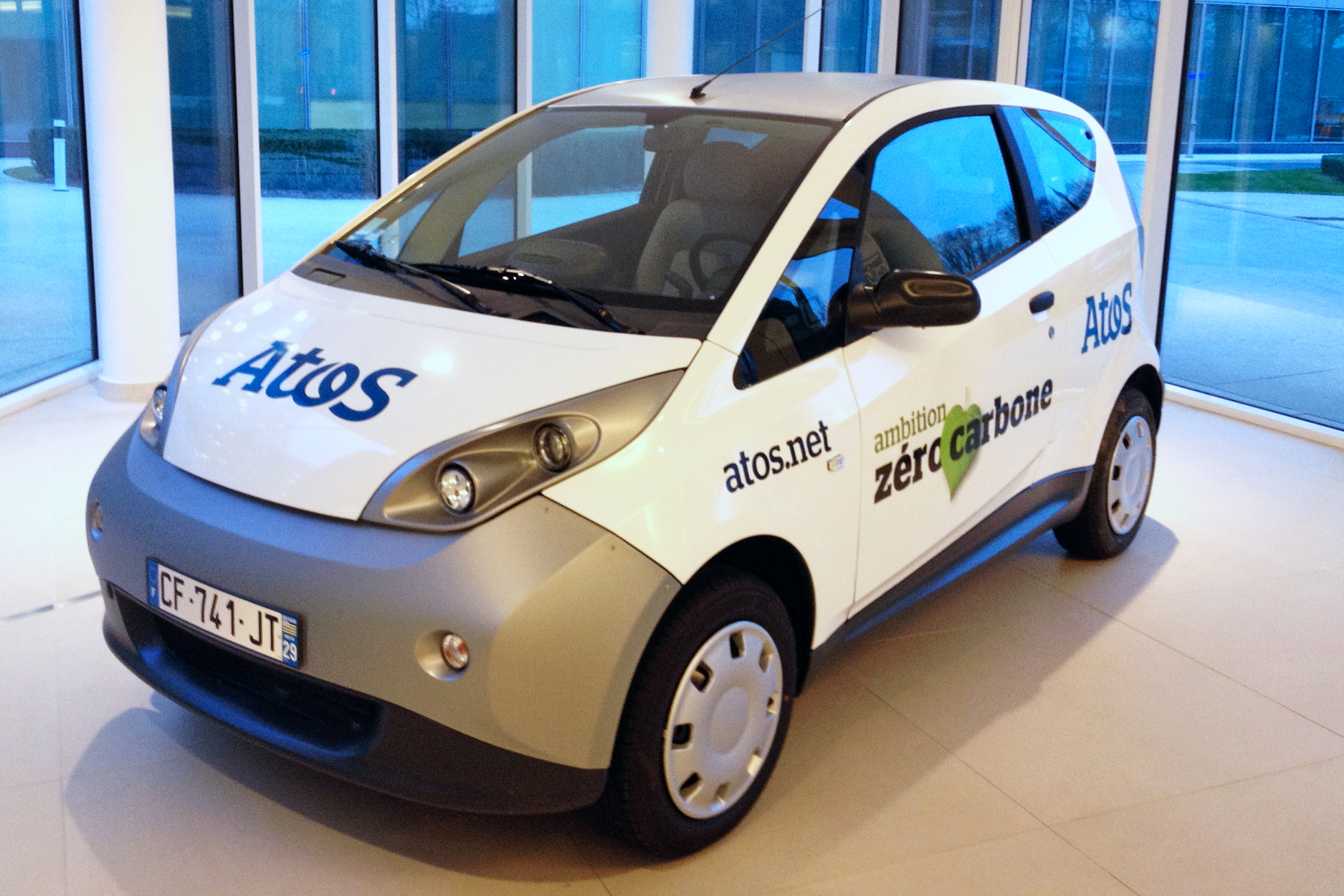
Bluecar used by Atos MyCar corporate carsharing service in Bezons, France

=== Atos MyCar ===
Atos and Bolloré Group launched the MyCar corporate carsharing pilot program in December 2012. The service is dedicated to Atos employees for their business travel needs at the company's headquarters in Bezons, France. Atos employees can book a car on the Atos intranet, pick it up and drive away. Besides promoting a more sustainable way to travel for business, Atos also expects that the MyCar service will reduce time spent booking travel and taxis, as well as the need for expense claims for business kilometers traveled, taxis and parking.

A fleet of ten Atos branded Bolloré Bluecars were initially deployed, and photovoltaic panels covering 60m^{2} provide a power of 12 kW to charge the vehicles at the Bezons site. In addition, during their trips users can also access the 3,500 Autolib' charging stations available in Paris and its surrounding area. The carsharing service is part of Atos "Zero carbon" initiative that aims to reduce by 50% Atos carbon footprint by 2015.

== Fire incidents ==
On October 14, 2013, a Bluecar burned down while parked and charging at an Autolib' carsharing kiosk in Paris and the fire then spread to a second Bluecar. A police investigation is looking into the cause of the fire. According to Bolloré, the real-time telemetric monitoring system did not register a thermal runaway problem with the battery of the car where the fire started. The company is attributing the origin of the fire to an external cause, probably vandalism. Bolloré reported that a total of 25 Bluecars in service for Autolib' have burnt during the previous two years, most of them certified as attributed to vandals.

== See also ==
- Government incentives for plug-in electric vehicles
- List of production battery electric vehicles
