= Bo, Chanthaburi =

Bo บ่อ
- Tambon
- Country: Thailand
- Province: Chanthaburi
- Amphoe: Khlung

Population (2017)
  - Total: 7,213
- Time zone: UTC+7 (TST)
- Postal code: 22110
- TIS 1099: 220202

Bo (Thai: บ่อ, pronounced [bɔ̀ː]) is a tambon (subdistrict) of Khlung District, in Chanthaburi Province, Thailand. In 2017, it had a total population of 7,213 people.

== Administration ==
=== Central administration ===
The tambon is subdivided into 10 administrative villages (muban).

No.	Name	Thai
1.	Ban Nong Rahan	บ้านหนองระหาน
2.	Ban Wak	บ้านหวัก
3.	Ban Bo Bon	บ้านบ่อบน
4.	Ban Bo Lang	บ้านบ่อล่าง
5.	Ban Hua Na	บ้านหัวนา
6.	Ban Map Chumhet	บ้านมาบชุมเห็ด
7.	Ban Tha Son	บ้านท่าสอน
8.	Ban Wang Sappharot	บ้านวังสรรพรส
9.	Ban Wak	บ้านหวัก
10.	Ban Bo Ta Chu	บ้านบ่อตาจู๋

=== Local administration ===
The whole area of the subdistrict is covered by the subdistrict municipality (Thesaban Tambon) Bo (เทศบาลตำบลบ่อ).
