= Autolib' =

French carsharing company

- Type: Public
- Industry: Car rental
- Founded: December 2011 (Paris); October 2013 (Lyon); January 2014 (Bordeaux)
- Defunct: 31 July 2018
- Headquarters: Paris, France
- Area served: Paris, Bordeaux and Lyon
- Services: Carsharing
- Parent: Bolloré
- Website: autolib.eu autolibmetropole.fr

Autolib' (French: [otolib]) was an electric car sharing service which was inaugurated in Paris, France, in December 2011. It closed on 31 July 2018. It was operated by the Bolloré industry and complemented the city's bike sharing system, Vélib', which was set up in 2007. The Autolib' service maintained a fleet of all-electric Bolloré Bluecars for public use on a paid subscription basis, employing a citywide network of parking and charging stations. As of 3 July 2016, 3,980 Bluecars had been registered for the service and had more than 126,900 registered subscribers; Autolib' furthermore offered 1,084 electric car stations in Paris agglomeration with 5,935 charging points.

Since beginning operations in Paris, Autolib' expanded its business to the cities of Lyon and Bordeaux. Bolloré also signed deals to begin operating offshoots of Autolib' in London and Indianapolis in 2015, Turin in 2016 and Singapore in 2017.

== History ==
The Autolib' system was a follow-up to Paris's successful Vélib' bike sharing system, which began operations in 2007. The system's electric cars were supplied by the Bolloré industrial group, as the result of a collaboration with the Italian automotive firm Pininfarina. There were also plans to integrate payment for the bicycle and car hire services with the ticketing systems for traditional modes of public transport. In May 2012, Vincent Bolloré, the head of the Bolloré group, stated that he expected Autolib' to become profitable by 2018, but the service ended on 31 July 2018 and was replaced on 2 December 2018 by a municipal service to manage the 1000 electrical charging stations in Paris and the City of Paris concluded agreements with several carsharing societies: three freefloating operators and four additional ones participating to the new service Mobilib'.

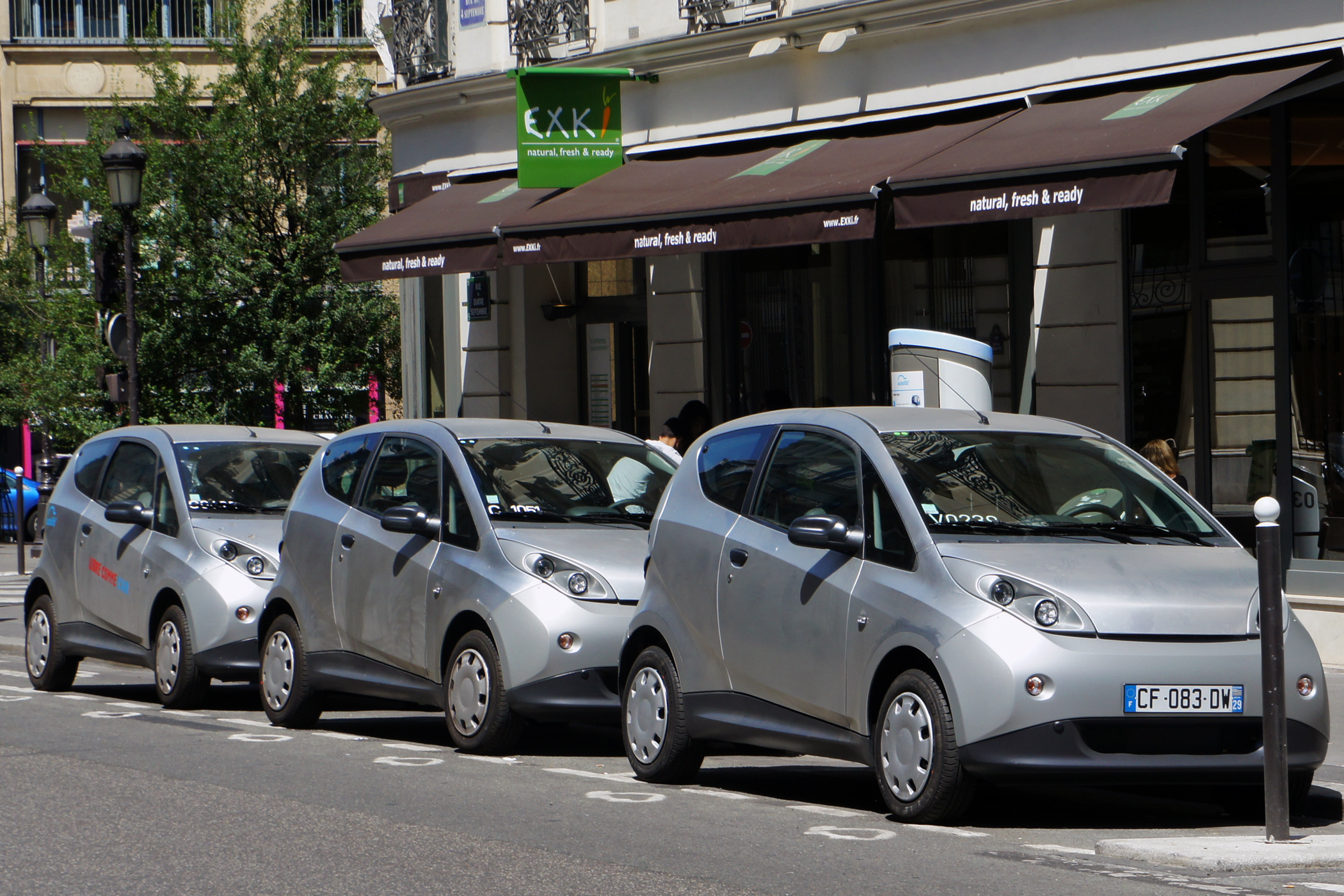
Bolloré Bluecars recharging at an Autolib' service kiosk on Rue du Quatre Septembre, Paris, in June 2012.

Construction of the Autolib' stations began in mid-2011, and 66 of the Bolloré Bluecars were deployed for a two-month preliminary trial period between October and December 2011. The system entered service on 5 December 2011, with an initial fleet of 250 Bluecars and 250 Autolib' rental stations serving the city of Paris and 18 surrounding communities (96 in 2016), grouped into the syndicate of associated collectivities "Autolib' Métropole".

At its inception, car availability was a problematic issue, as more Parisians than expected subscribed to the service. Moreover, by early January 2012, up to 40 of the 250 cars in the initial fleet had been temporarily withdrawn from service to repair vandalism or malfunctions.

By July 2012, 650 parking and charging stations had been deployed around Paris and the 46 communes participating in the service, and by February 2013 there were 4,000 charging points. The program's user base grew from 6,000 subscribers at the end of December 2011 to 27,000 in July 2012, and reached 37,000 by early October 2012, of which 13,000 had an annual subscription.

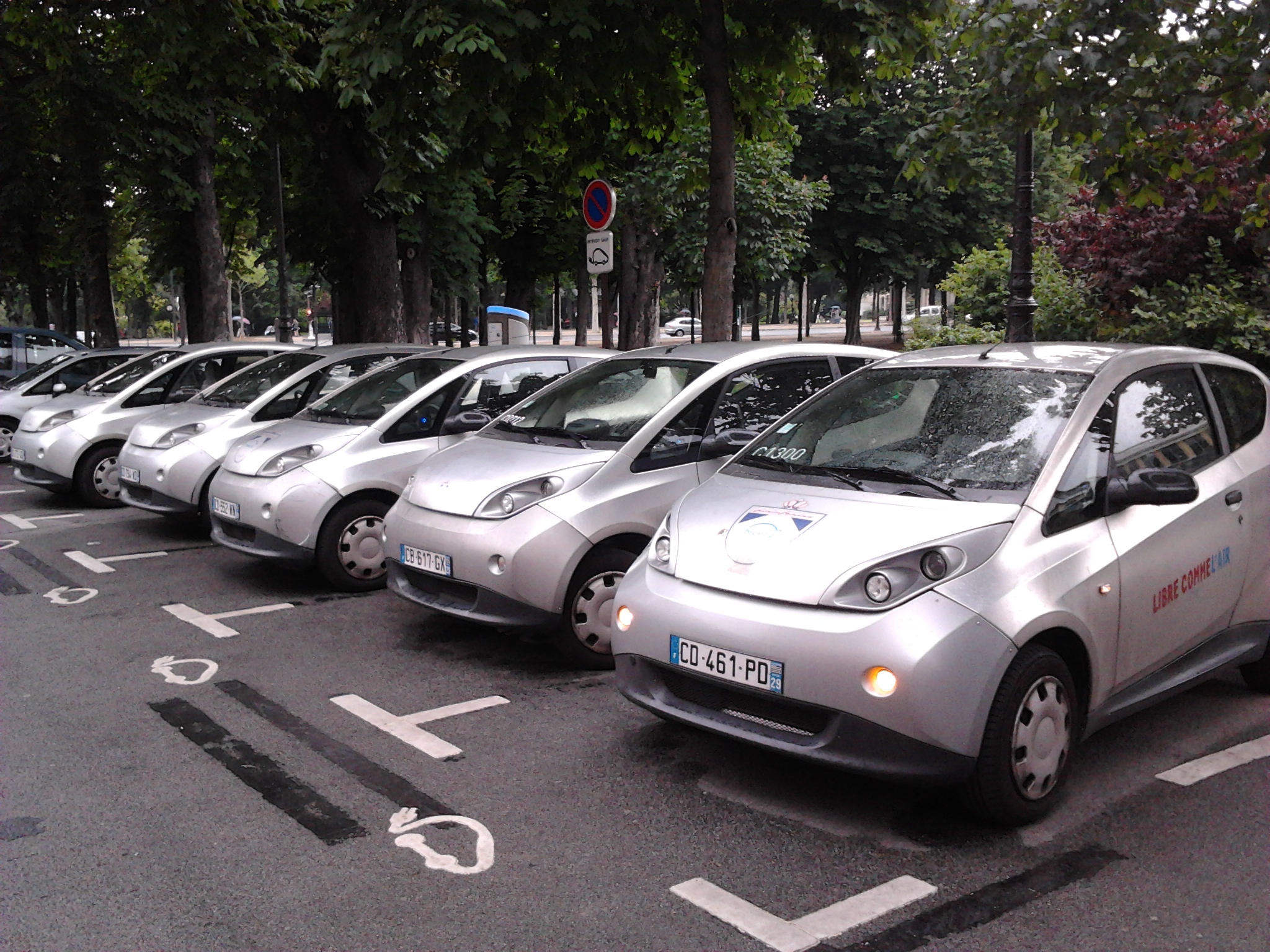
An Autolib' rental station in 2013.

During 2012, sales of electric cars in France were led by the Bolloré Bluecar deployed for Autolib', with 1,543 units registered, representing 28% of total all-electric cars registered in the country that year. Over 2,000 Bolloré Bluecars had been registered for Autolib' by September 2013. By late September 2012, Autolib's fleet reached the milestone of 500,000 rentals since its launch, and its vehicles had been driven a cumulative total of 15,000,000 km (9,300,000 mi) by February 2013. By mid-October 2013, the service had provided over 3 million rentals, with an average of 10,000 rentals per day. By July 2014, Autolib' had 2,500 operational vehicles and over 150,000 subscribers, and its cars had covered a cumulative mileage of over 30,000,000 km (19,000,000 mi) since the service's introduction. In July 2018 the service ceased to operate. Some cars that were part of the fleet are parked in Loir-et-Cher, near Romorantin.

=== Name lawsuit ===
In December 2009, the car-rental company Europcar brought the City of Paris to court, arguing that the Autolib' name was a plagiarism and unfair competition by the city. Europcar is the trademark owner of the rental car subscription service "Autoliberté", which has been in operation since 2001. The case was dismissed in March 2011 by the High Court of Paris, and Europcar decided to appeal. On 30 June 2012, the Paris Court of Appeal set aside the judgment of the High Court, and ruled that within a month Autolib' had to change its name because it breached trademark laws. The ruling implied that the name had to be changed on all 1,800 Autolib' cars, docking stations and subscriber cards, and also required that all of the business's advertising to be rewritten.

After the ruling, the City of Paris and Europcar began negotiating an agreement to solve the brand name conflict. In November 2012, an agreement was reached to keep the Autolib' brand name. Europcar agreed to waive the enforcement of the court decision on the condition that the City of Paris would be the owner of the Autolib' brand, and in exchange for free advertising for Europcar's Autoliberté service. The agreement was signed for three years.

=== Fire incidents ===
On 14 October 2013, a Bluecar was destroyed by fire while charging at an Autolib' kiosk in Paris; the fire then spread to a second Bluecar. A police investigation was subsequently conducted to ascertain the cause of the fire. According to Bolloré, the real-time telemetric monitoring system did not register a thermal runaway problem with the car's battery when the fire started. The company attributed the origin of the fire to an external cause, probably vandalism. Bolloré reported that a total of 25 Autolib' Bluecars have burnt out since its inception, with most of the incidents certified as attributed to vandals.

== Autolib' beyond Paris ==
In early 2013, the Bolloré Group announced plans to launch a similar car-sharing service in Lyon and Bordeaux, but under a different brand name and with no cost to the cities. Bolloré's proposal was to fund the entire infrastructure, install and provide the vehicles, and cover the costs of maintenance and repairs. Bolloré furthermore expressed interest in launching a car-sharing service in Asia. In October 2013, proposals were advanced for Scootlib', an electric scooter-sharing system intended to complement Vélib' and Autolib'.

Bolloré's Lyon service, dubbed BlueLy, began in October 2013 with an initial fleet of 130 vehicles and 51 parking and charging stations. Its Bordeaux service, BlueCub, began operating in January 2014 with an initial fleet of 90 vehicles, 40 parking stations and 180 charging stations.

In June 2013, Autolib' formed an agreement with the American city of Indianapolis, Indiana, to develop an electric car-sharing service there; the service, named BlueIndy, opened to the public in September 2015. A similar service based in London was announced in 2014, and will be inaugurated in March 2015, utilising London's existing network of electric car charging points. The London system is intended to encompass 3,000 electric cars by 2018.

In June 2016, Bolloré signed an agreement with Singapore's Land Transport Authority (LTA) and Economic Development Board to develop an electric car-sharing programme, known as BlueSG. Construction of the charging stations began at the end of September, 2017 and in December, 2017, the service was officially opened to the public with 30 charging stations and 80 cars located throughout the country, with plans to expand the service to offer 2,000 charging points in 500 charging locations, with 400 charging points open for public use and 1,000 electric cars deployed by 2020.

In October 2016, in Turin, Italy, the service BlueTorino was activated. Now counting 130 vehicles and 54 charging stations, it's expected by the completion of the project a fleet of 330 vehicles and 80 charging stations around the city.

== Operation ==
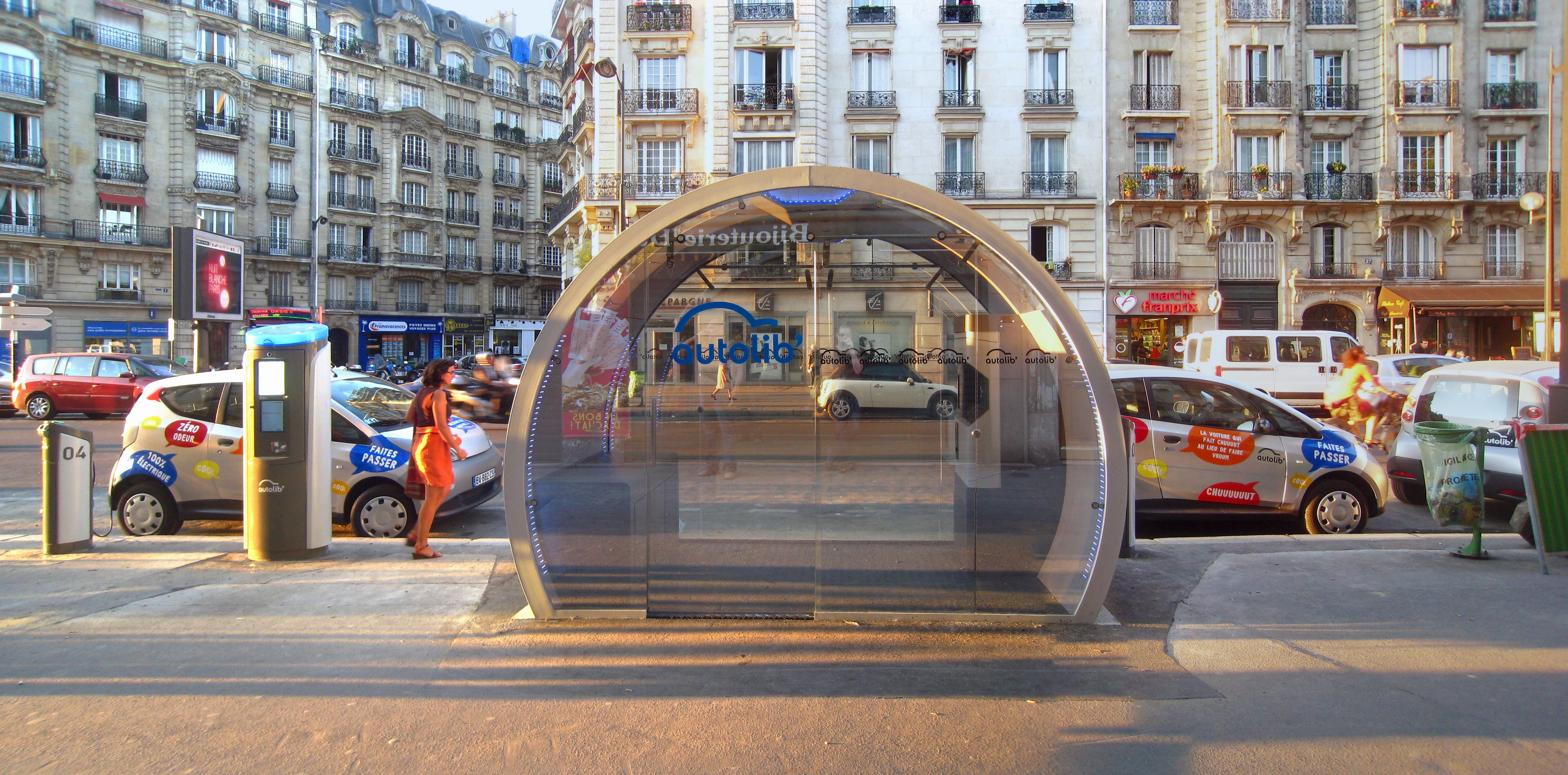
An Autolib' kiosk on Boulevard Diderot.

The Autolib' Bluecar was available to anyone aged 18 or older with a valid French driving license, or a valid foreign license plus the international driving license, who took out a paid subscription. Users could choose between 2 rental packages, with 30-minute fees varying from €6 to €9 depending on the rental plan. An available car could be collected for use from any rental station and returned to any other rental station. Each car had on-board GPS capabilities and could be tracked by the system's operations center.

In addition to the subscription fees, Autolib' charged a variable rate for each half an hour of use, but billing for each rental was calculated on a pro rata basis, which took into account the actual duration of use rounded up to the nearest minute (except for the first 20 minutes, for which there is a minimum charge). The table below summarizes the subscription types that were available, the subscription fees and the corresponding 30-minute rates:

Autolib' service fees and use rates
Plan	Membership	Subscription fees	Car reservation	Rates per each 30 min interval	Maximum rates in case of accident		
Plan	Membership	Subscription fees	Car reservation	Rates per each 30 min interval	First accident	Second accident	Third accident (max)
1 year	1 year	€120 per year (€10 per month)	€0	€6	€200	€475	€750
Ready to Go	1 year	€0 per year (€0 per month)	€1	€9	€200	€475	€750

== Other services ==
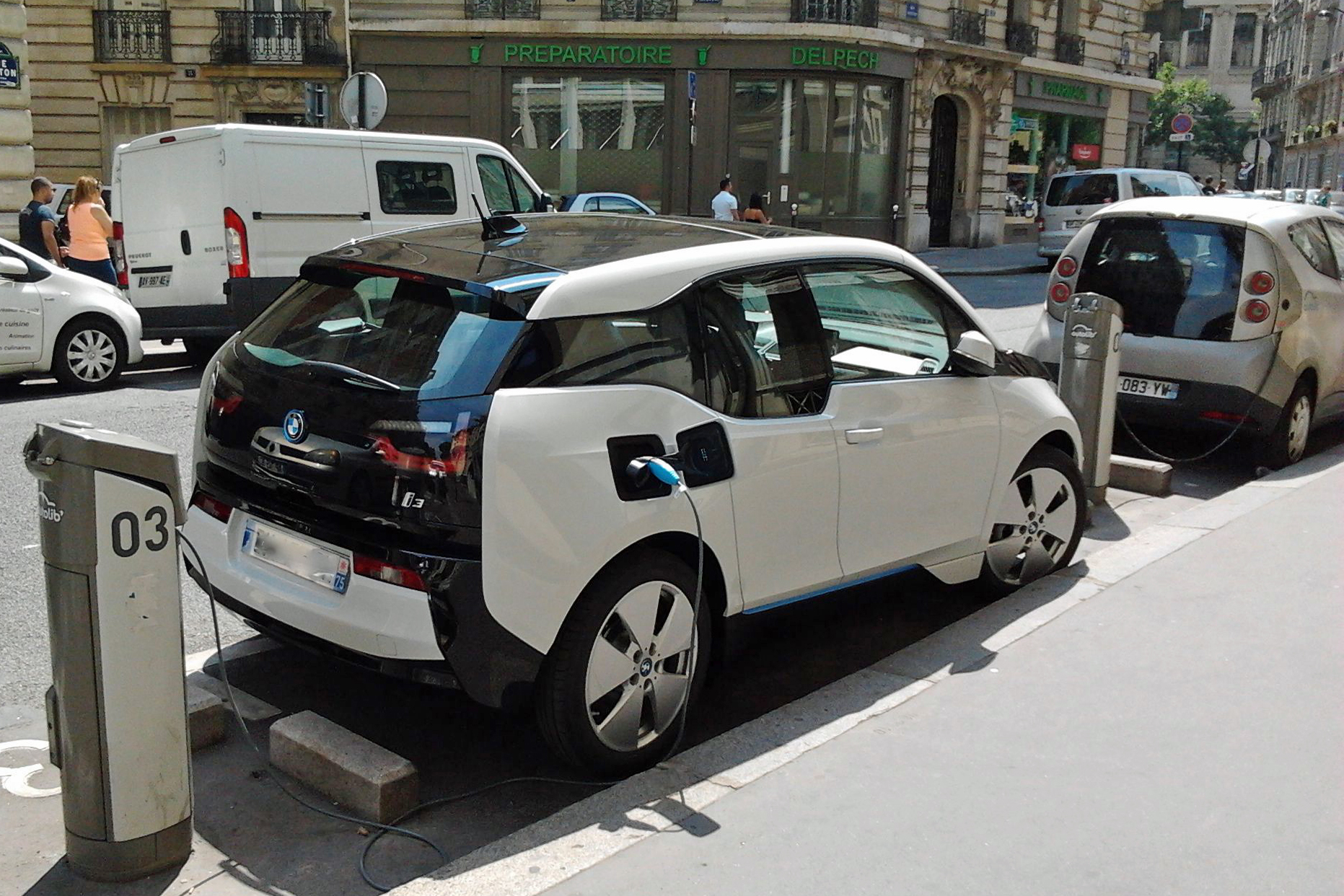
A privately owned BMW i3 charging at an Autolib' station in Paris.

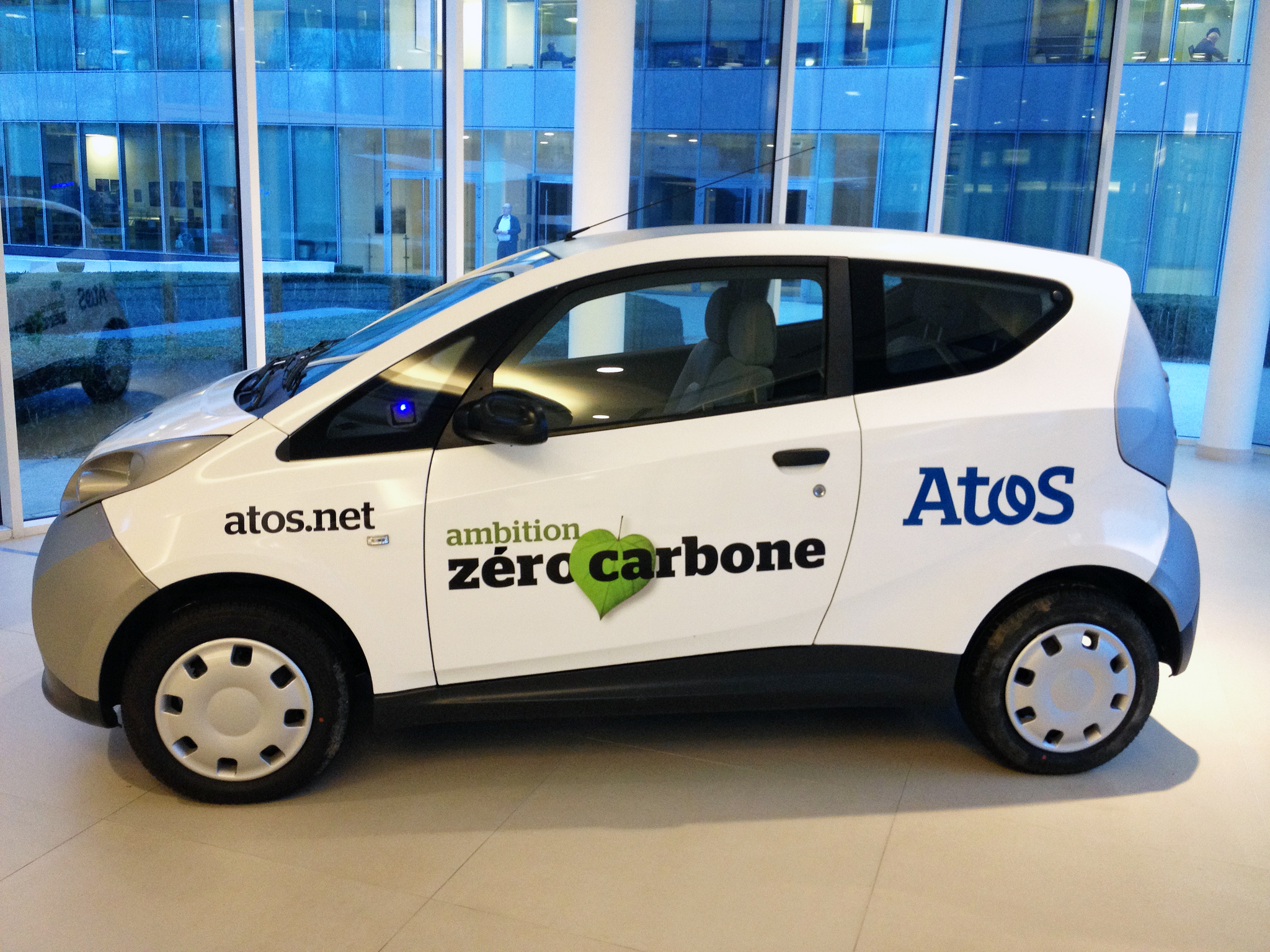
A Bluecar used by the Atos MyCar corporate carsharing service in Bezons, France, in 2012.

=== Private EV charging service ===
In addition to charging its own vehicles, the Autolib' service offered charging services for private owners of electric cars and motorcycles. Customers had to sign up for the "recharge" fee option. The subscription cost for cars and motorcycles was €15 per year only the first year. Recharge customers had designated parking spaces at Autolib' stations, marked with a blue square. Each hour cost €1 for cars and motorcycles. Use of the charging infrastructure for private cars was limited to two times per day per subscriber.

In early 2014, Renault offered free Autolib' charging subscriptions to owners of Renault EVs. Autolib' charging stations were compatible with the following plug-in electric vehicles: BMW i3, Nissan Leaf, Mitsubishi i-MiEV, Opel Ampera, Renault Fluence Z.E., Renault Kangoo Z.E., Renault Twizy, Renault Zoe, Toyota Prius Plug-in Hybrid and all Smart ED, Peugeot iOn and Citroen C-Zero manufactured before May 2013.

=== Bluecar leasing and sales program ===
Bolloré began leasing the Bluecar to individual and corporate customers in October 2012 at a price of €500 (US$648) per month. The pricing included insurance, parking and charging at Autolib' stations. According to Bolloré, each existing station already provided one recharging space for private electric cars outside the Autolib' system. The Bluecar retail version had a blue exterior color, unlike the Autolib' version's silver unpainted aluminum exterior. In February 2013 Bolleré announced the start of retail sales of the Bluecar, and for an optional monthly fee of €15, owners could have access to the Autolib' network of charging stations around Paris.

=== Corporate carsharing ===
Atos and the Bolloré Group launched the MyCar corporate car sharing pilot program in December 2012. The service was dedicated to Atos employees for their business travel needs at the company's headquarters in the French town of Bezons. A fleet of ten Atos-branded Bolloré Bluecars were initially deployed. In addition to charging vehicles at the solar-powered Bezons site, MyCar users could also access the Autolib' network of charging stations in Paris and its surrounding area.

In January 2013, a similar leasing deal was reached with Crédit Agricole, the largest retail banking group in France. Five Bluecars were leased for 20 months for business travel use by the bank's employees.

== See also ==
- BlueSG, an electric-car-sharing service in Singapore
- Car2Go, an international car sharing service which also offers electric car rentals
- Communauto, a Montreal-based electric and hybrid vehicle car sharing company
- Kandi EV CarShare, an electric car-sharing program in Hangzhou, China
- Plug-in electric vehicles in France
