= Bo language =

Bo language can refer to:

- Bo language (Laos) (Maleng)
- Bo language (India) (Aka-Bo)
- Bo language (New Guinea)
- Bo language (Mali) (Bomu)
- Bankon language (Cameroon), also known as Bo language
- Barkul language (Nigeria), also known as Bo-Rukul
- Lhasa Tibetan, as its ISO 639-1 code is bo
