= Bo Prefecture (Shandong) =

Historical administrative division in Shandong, China

Bozhou or Bo Prefecture (Chinese: 博州) was a zhou (prefecture) in imperial China, centering on modern Liaocheng, Shandong, China. It existed (intermittently) from 596 until 1267.

== Geography ==
The administrative region of Bo Prefecture in the Tang dynasty is in Liaocheng modern western Shandong. It probably includes parts of modern:

- Liaocheng
- Chiping County
- Gaotang County

== Population ==
In the early 1100s during the Song dynasty, there were 46,492 households and 91,333 people.

== See also ==
- Boping Commandery
