= Bø =

Bø may refer to the following:

== Places ==
=== Norway ===
In Norway, Bø commonly refers to:

- Bø Municipality (Nordland), a municipality in Nordland county
- Bø i Vesterålen, a village within Bø Municipality in Nordland county
- Bø Municipality (Telemark), a former municipality in Telemark county
- Bø, Midt-Telemark, a village in Midt-Telemark Municipality in Telemark county

It may also refer to:

- Bø, Andøy, a village in Andøy Municipality in Nordland county
- Bø, Drangedal, a village in Drangedal Municipality in Telemark county
- Bø, Hordaland, a former municipality in Hordaland county (also called Hordabø Municipality)
- Bø, Sortland, a village in Sortland Municipality in Nordland county
- Bø, Steigen, a village in Steigen Municipality in Nordland county
- Bø, Troms, a village in Tjeldsund Municipality in Troms county
- Bø, Vestvågøy, a village in Vestvågøy Municipality in Nordland county
- Bø Station, a railway station in Bø Municipality in Telemark county
- Bø Church (Hyllestad), a church in Hyllestad Municipality in Vestland county
- Bø Church (Nordland), a church in Bø Municipality in Nordland county
- Bø Church (Telemark), a church in Midt-Telemark Municipality in Telemark county
- Old Bø Church, a historic church in Midt-Telemark Municipality in Telemark county

== People ==
- Alisha Bø, a Norwegian actress
- Egil á Bø, a Faroese football defender who plays for EB/Streymur and the Faroe Islands national football team
- Finn Bø, a Norwegian songwriter, revue writer, playwright, journalist, and theatre critic
- Johannes Thingnes Bø, a Norwegian biathlete
- Tarjei Bø, a Norwegian professional biathlete
