= Bo Prefecture (Anhui and Henan) =

Imperial Chinese prefecture

Bozhou or Bo Prefecture (Chinese: 亳州) was a zhou (prefecture) in Imperial China, centering on modern-day Bozhou, Anhui. It existed intermittently from the 6th century until 1912.

The modern prefecture-level city Bozhou, created in 1986, retains its name.

== Geography ==
The administrative region of Bo Prefecture in the Tang dynasty is in the border area of modern northern Anhui and southeastern Henan. It probably includes parts of modern:

- Under the administration of Bozhou, Anhui:
  - Bozhou
  - Mengcheng County
- Under the administration of Shangqiu, Henan:
  - Yongcheng
- Under the administration of Zhoukou, Henan:
  - Luyi County

== Population ==
In the early 1100s during the Song dynasty, there were 130,119 households and 183,581 people.

== See also ==
- Qiao Commandery
