= List of carsharing organizations =

This is an incomplete list of currently operating carsharing organizations. Carsharing is model of car rental where people rent cars for short periods of time, often by the hour or minute.

Name	Headquarters	Fleet size	Fleet size date	Type	Power source	
Name	Headquarters	Fleet size	Fleet size date	Type	ICE	BEV
AutoShare	Canada	100+				100
BlueSG	Singapore	600+	February 2020	Free-floating		600+
Bolt Drive	Estonia			Free-floating		
Cambio CarSharing	Germany	2,700				
Cityhop	New Zealand	80+	May 2018		70+	10+
Communauto	Canada	7,000	2025	Round-trip / Free-floating		
Community CarShare	Canada	76				
Delimobil incl. Anytime and Anytime Prime	Russia	30,700	H1 2025	Free-floating		
Didi Chuxing	China					
Enjoy	Italy	2,670	June 2016	Free-floating		
Enterprise CarShare	United States					
EvCard	China	30,000+	September 2019			
Evo Car Share	Canada	2,500	March 2025			
Flexicar	Australia	140+				
Flinkster (network)	Germany	~4,500	2025	Free-floating		600+
Free2Move	France	12,500	2022	Round-trip / Free-floating		
GetGo (carsharing company)	Singapore	3,000+				
Gig Car Share	United States	250	April 2017			
GoCar	Ireland	850+		Round-trip		
GoGet	Australia	3,000+	2025			
Grab (company)	Singapore	0		Peer-to-peer		
Greenwheels	Netherlands	2,300	February 2022			
Kandi Technologies	China					
Modo (car co-op)	Canada	1,000+	September 2023	Round-trip		
Mondo Ride	UAE					
MylesCar	India	250				
Ola Cabs	India	0				
Pathao	Bangladesh					
Stadtmobil	Germany	2,600+	January 2018	Round-trip / Free-floating		
TappCar	Canada	0				
Turo	United States	360,000 (listings)	March 2024	Peer-to-peer		
Uhaul Car Share	United States					
Witkar	Netherlands					
Yandex.Drive	Russia	16,000	2025	Free-floating		
Yourdrive	New Zealand	600+		Peer-to-peer	550+	20+
Zipcar	United States	12,000	2019	Round-trip		

== Defunct services ==
- Autolib'
- car2go
- Car Next Door (rebranded to Uber Carshare, shut down 2024)
- City Car Club (merged into Enterprise Car Club)
- City CarShare
- DriveNow
- Flexcar
- Getaround (US operations)
- I-GO
- JustShareIt
- Maven
- PhillyCarShare
- ReachNow
- Share Now (acquired by Free2Move)
- Streetcar
- Tilden Rent-a-Car
- Whizzgo

== See also ==
- Sharing economy
- Alternatives to car use
- Car rental
- Carpool
- Fleet vehicle
