= CarSharing Association =

CarSharing Association (CSA) is a federation of 25 carsharing organizations worldwide representing more than 4,000 shared vehicles and more than 125,000 member-drivers in total. The goal of CSA is "to provide a respected authority and unified industry voice in order to support its members, their constituents and the communities in which they operate."

The Association works on industry standards, best practices; produces educational networking and conference events and advocates for public policy that is supportive of the shared-use mobility industry. The Association also promotes the Code of Ethics and Standards of Practice for round-trip, station-based carsharing operators. CSA emphasizes sustainability, social and financial benefits, and integration with public transportation.

== Member organizations ==
- AutoShare
- Buffalo CarShare
- CarShareHFX
- CarShare Vermont
- Capital CarShare
- City CarShare
- City of Aspen
- CityWheels
- Coast Car Co-op
- Communauto
- Community Car
- Community CarShare
- eGo CarShare
- Enterprise CarShare
- GoGet
- HOURCAR
- I-GO Car Sharing
- Ithaca Carshare
- JuiceCar
- JustShareIt
- Modo the Car Co-op
- Peg City Car Co-op
- Playcar Car Sharing
- VRTUCAR
- Zazcar

== See also ==
- Bundesverband CarSharing (Germany)
