= SnappCar =

Peer-to-peer carsharing company

Carshare Ventures B.V.
- Trade name: SnappCar
- Industry: Car rental
- Founded: 2011
- Founder: Victor van Tol; Pascal Onijd
- Headquarters: Utrecht, Netherlands
- Services: Peer-to-peer car sharing
- Website: snappcar.nl

SnappCar (Carshare Ventures B.V.) is a Dutch peer-to-peer carsharing company based in Utrecht, Netherlands. The company operates in Netherlands and Germany. SnappCar, being a peer-to-peer carsharing company, doesn't own its fleet. The company's service enables car owners to rent out their personal vehicles, while ensuring insurance coverage.

== Overview ==
As of 2019, the company was the second largest peer-to-peer carsharing platform in Europe. SnappCar offers some of the rental cars with keyless technology, enabling opening a car through its mobile application. While it's technically possible to rent cars on SnappCar as a business, it's barred by the platform, and is actively monitored.

SnappCar has been certified as a B Corporation since 2015.

== History ==
The company was founded in 2011, by Pascal Onijd and Victor van Tol. It launched its website on October 3, 2011.

The company raised money through crowdfunding in 2014. and 2015. In 2015 SnappCar acquired a Danish company MinBilDilBil, in turn operating in Netherlands, Germany, Denmark and Sweden, bringing its user base to a total of 100,000, and 12'500 offered vehicles, and later that year acquired a Swedish start-up FlexiDrive.

In July 2017 the company raised 10 million for a 20% stake from Europcar. In September 2017, SnappCar acquired its German competitor Tamyca, expanding its user base from 250,000 to 400,000, and reaching 45,000 offered vehicles.

In 2018, its investor Europcar launched a joint "Drive & Share" program for long-term car rental with Europcar which offered earnings from the SnappCar rental.

In 2019 the company initiated partnerships with several more car rental companies in the Netherlands, raised funding from Dutch petrol station operator Tango, owned by Kuwait Petroleum International (Q8), while reaching 700,000 users and 80,000 registered vehicles.

In 2020 the company closed its operations in Denmark, raised additional funding, and appointed Erik Rutten, who had been the company's CFO, as CEO, replacing Victor van Tol.

In 2023 the company closed its operations in Sweden, transferring its users to GoMore.

== See also ==
- Sharing economy
- Platform economy
- Car rental
- Carpooling
- Vehicle insurance
- List of carsharing organizations
