= Volvo On Demand =

Swedish car-sharing company

Volvo On demand, founded as Sunfleet and between 2019 and 2022 called M, was a station-based car-sharing company that provides services to rent and share cars in Sweden.

== Creation and ownership ==
It was founded in 1998 as a collaboration between Volvo and Hertz but it is since 2019, and the namechange to M, owned solemnly by Volvo Cars.

== Plans ==
As of 2017, it operates in more than 50 cities in Sweden and has 50,000 users using 1,200 Volvo cars. There were plans to expand the company to operate globally, but on 13 November 2024, the company announced that Volvo on Demand will be shut down on 13 January 2025, citing "profitability reasons as part of a group-wide effort to optimize costs.
