= Indie Campers =

Campervan rental and marketplace company

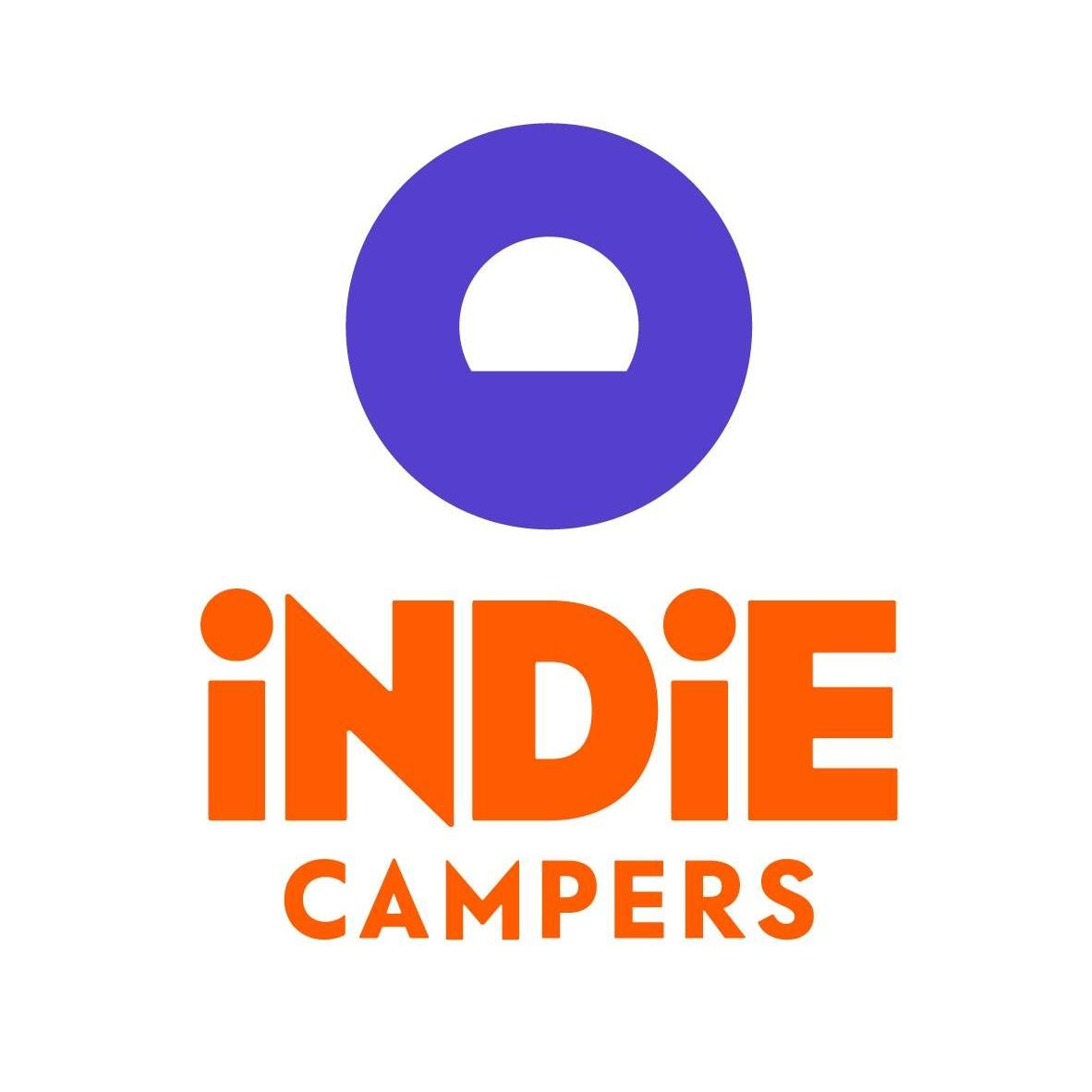
- Type: Private
- Industry: Recreational vehicle rental
- Founded: February 14, 2013
- Founders: Hugo Oliveira; Stefan Koeppl
- Headquarters: Lisbon, Portugal
- Area served: Europe; North America; Oceania
- Key people: Hugo Oliveira (CEO)
- Products: Campervan and motorhome rentals; RV marketplace; RV sales
- Website: indiecampers.com

Indie Campers is a recreational vehicle (RV) rental company and road-trip marketplace headquartered in Lisbon, Portugal. Founded in 2013 by Hugo Oliveira and Stefan Koeppl, the company combines an owned fleet with a peer-to-peer marketplace of privately owned and professional-host vehicles. It operates in more than 100 locations across Europe, North America and Oceania and reports a fleet of over 10,000 owned vehicles, with additional inventory available via its marketplace.

== History ==
Indie Campers was founded in Lisbon in 2013 by Hugo Oliveira and co-founder Stefan Koeppl; Koeppl left the company in 2014. In 2015 the public venture fund Portugal Ventures invested in the company; in 2017, after the firm's international expansion, that stake was sold. Indie Campers was included among Europe's fastest-growing companies in the Financial Times FT 1000 (2020) ranking, where Portuguese media reported it as a Top-40 entry.

The company expanded to the United States in late 2021, opening its first location in Los Angeles with Jeep-based campers, followed by additional North American sites. In 2023 the company entered Oceania with operations in Australia and New Zealand.

In July 2024 Indie Campers raised €35 million in a round led by Indico Capital Partners, with participation from Cedrus and GED Ventures; in May 2025 it closed a €27.5 million extension, bringing total new funding over roughly one year to €62.5 million.

== Operations and business model ==
Indie Campers operates a hybrid model. Its owned fleet is deployed across a network of depots on three continents. In parallel, Indie Campers acts as a broker for "marketplace" rentals from private owners, broadening availability and geographical coverage beyond company-operated depots.

== RV sales ==
The company is actively developing an RV sales business unit in Europe, North America and Oceania, focused on selling high-quality vehicles, including refurbished and de-fleeted units.

== Vehicle categories ==
As of 2025, Indie Campers groups its vehicles into five categories to simplify comparisons across regions. The categories align with widely used RV classes and typical layouts.

Category	Generic RV class	Capacity (people)	Bathroom	Typical use	Availability notes
Adventure	4×4 with rooftop tent	2–4	No indoor bathroom	Off-grid travel, wild camping	Availability varies by region
California	Compact campervan (small Class B)	4	Optional (varies by model)	Urban trips, weekend getaways	Multi-region
Grand California	Class B Campervan	2 Adults + 2 Kids	Yes	Family Trips with comfort	Multi-region
Active	Standard campervan (Class B)	2–4	Yes (in many models)	Longer trips with full standing room	Multi-region
Comfort	Motorhome (Class C)	4–6	Yes	Families and long-haul road trips	Multi-region
Space	Class A	6-8	Yes	Maximum room and full amenities	Europe and United States
Trailer	Towable trailer	5	Yes	Basecamp travel with a tow vehicle	United States only

== Headquarters and locations ==
The global headquarters is in Lisbon, Portugal. The company also operates regional offices in Mexico City (serving the North American market) and Manila (serving Asia–Pacific).

=== Pickup locations ===
Europe: Reykjavík; Tromsø; Trondheim; Bergen; Oslo; Stockholm; Helsinki; Copenhagen; Malmö; Hamburg; Hanover; Berlin; Leipzig; Frankfurt; Stuttgart; Munich; Cologne; Düsseldorf; Amsterdam; Brussels; Paris (CDG & Orly); Nantes; Bordeaux; Toulouse; Marseille; Lyon; Nice; Bastia (New 2026); Geneva; Zurich; Vienna; Milan (Bergamo & Malpensa); Venice; Bologna; Florence; Rome; Naples; Bari; Olbia; Catania; Cagliari (New 2026); Palermo (New 2026); Pisa (New 2026); Turin (New 2026); Split; Zagreb (New 2026); Athens; Heraklion; Bilbao; Porto; Lisbon; Faro; Seville; Málaga; Valencia; Madrid; Barcelona; Palma; Alicante (New 2026); Coruna (New 2026); Tenerife (New 2026); Krakow (New 2026); Warsaw (New 2026); Edinburgh; Manchester; London; Bristol; Glasgow (New 2026); Inverness (New 2026); Dublin.

North America: Anchorage; Vancouver; Calgary; Montreal (New 2026); Seattle; Portland; San Francisco; Los Angeles; San Diego; Las Vegas; Phoenix; Salt Lake City; Denver; Bozeman (New 2026); Chicago; Nashville (New 2026); Atlanta (New 2026); New Orleans (New 2026); Dallas (New 2026); Houston (New 2026); Toronto; New York; Boston (New 2026); Miami; Orlando (New 2026).

Oceania: Perth; Darwin; Cairns; Brisbane; Sydney; Melbourne; Hobart; Auckland; Christchurch; Queenstown.

== Awards ==
Indie Campers won Phocuswright Europe's Summit EMEA Travel Innovator of the Year in 2021.

== See also ==
- Recreational vehicle
- Peer-to-peer carsharing
