= Jessica Scorpio =

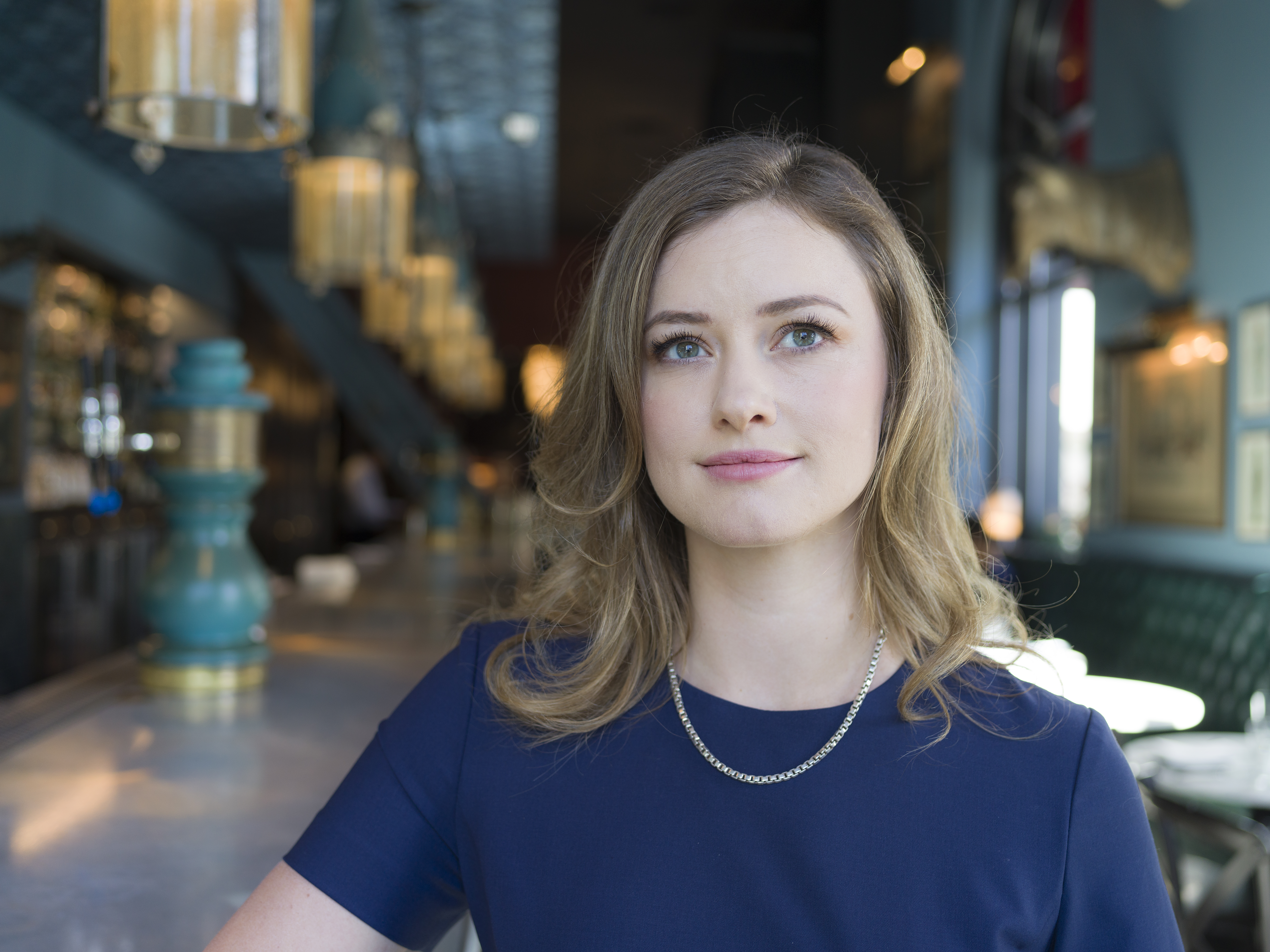
- Scorpio in 2018
- Born: 1987 (age 38–39); St. Catharines, Ontario, Canada
- Education: Carleton University
- Occupations: Founder and Former Chief Marketing Officer of Getaround

Jessica Scorpio (born 1987) is the founder and was the former chief marketing officer at Getaround, a now-defunct peer-to-peer carsharing company. Scorpio previously founded IDEAL, a non-profit network for entrepreneurs.

== Biography ==
Jessica Scorpio was born in St. Catharines, Ontario, Canada and grew up in Florida. She graduated from Carleton University in 2008 with an Honors Bachelor of Arts degree in Political Science with a concentration on International Relations and a minor in Business. Along with Sam Zaid and Elliot Kroo, she developed the concept that led to the launch of Getaround and Grand Prize Win at TechCrunch Disrupt New York in May 2011.

== Awards and recognition ==
In August 2011, the Huffington Post picked Scorpio to be on the list of female technology founders to watch. In February 2012, Business Insider, Inc. highlighted Scorpio as one of the 14 Incredible Women To Watch In Silicon Valley and listed her in the "Silicon Valley 100".

== Public speaking ==
Scorpio is a speaker and panelist who leads discussions about women in business, the future of transportation, sustainable living, and collaborative consumption. She has presented at events such as Google Zeitgeist, TechCrunch Disrupt, Sustainable Brands, and SXSW Interactive.
