= Flinkster =

German carsharing operator

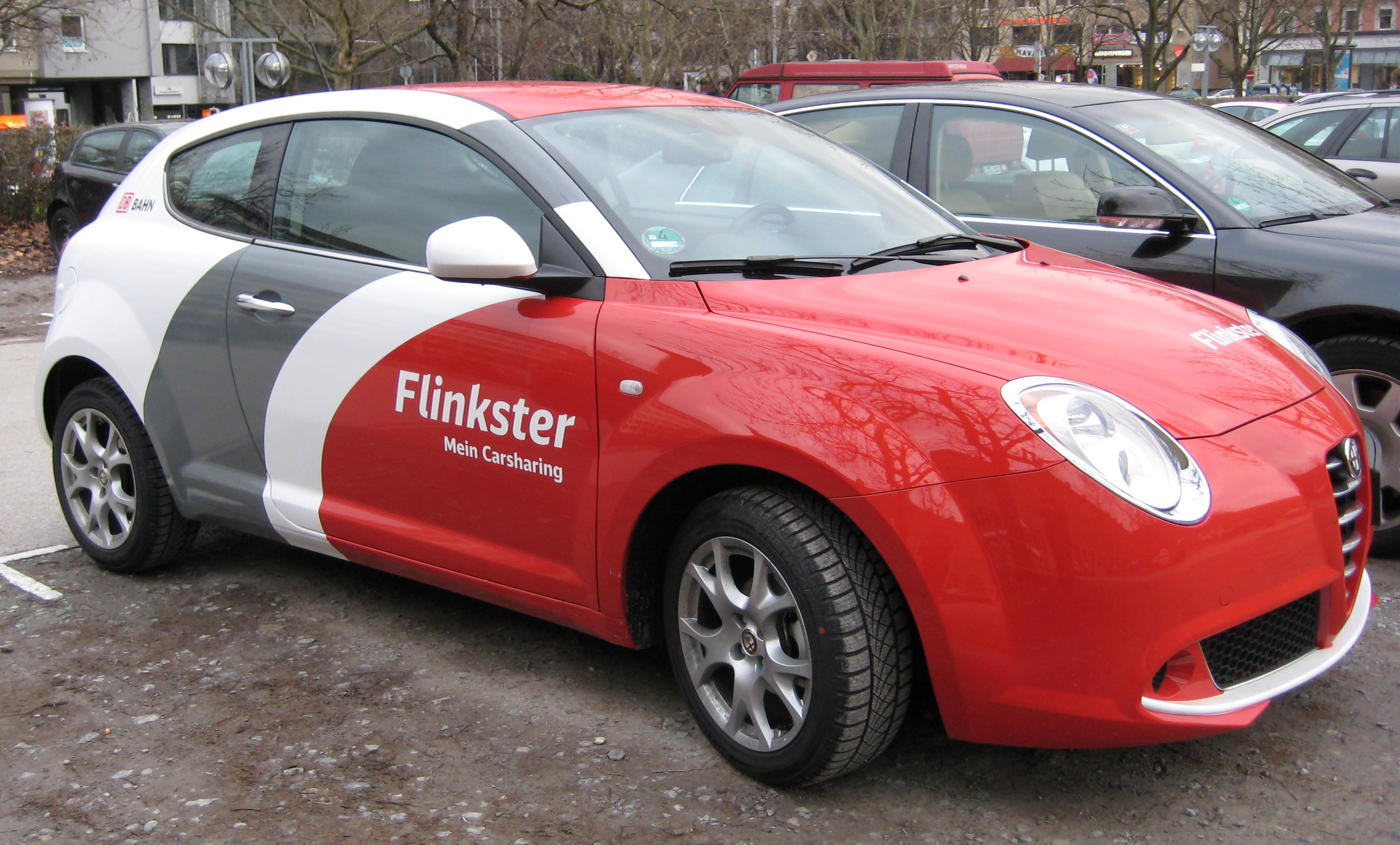
- Industry: Carsharing
- Headquarters: Germany
- Parent: Deutsche Bahn
- Website: flinkster.de

Flinkster is the name of the carsharing operations of the railway and logistics company Deutsche Bahn (DB) in Germany, managed by Deutsche Bahn Connect GmbH formerly called DB Rent, which is a subsidiary of DB Fuhrpark, which is a subsidiary of Deutsche Bahn AG. Flinkster was originally called DB Carsharing. Flinkster offers own cars (around 750) and access to those of regional partners, i.e. other car sharing companies (about 4000 vehicles in total).

The booking of cars in partner organizations is transparent to the Flinkster customer, since access to the booking engine of the actual car sharing provider is done by the DB Rent booking engine, whereas in the cooperation of Stadtmobil and Cambio CarSharing the user is logged in into the reservation system of the actual car sharing provider. The Flinkster user discovers the actual provider of the car only when standing in front of it.

Flinkster offers two tariffs, the nationwide tariff without a monthly fee (but with relatively high usage fees for hours and kilometers), and a city tariff with lower usage fees but a 10 Euro monthly subscription. Holders of a BahnCard, the DB customer loyalty card, enjoy special conditions.
