= Community CarShare =

Charitable foundation in Ontario

- Merged into: Vrtucar
- Successor: Communauto
- Formation: April 1, 1998; 28 years ago
- Founders: Marc Xuereb, Daryl Novak, and others
- Founded at: Waterloo Region
- Dissolved: March 27, 2018; 8 years ago
- Type: Non-profit co-op
- Headquarters: Kitchener, Ontario, Canada
- Region served: Waterloo Region, Hamilton, Guelph, St. Catharines, London; Brampton, and Burlington
- Services: Carsharing
- Staff: 7
- Website: communitycarshare.ca

Community CarShare was a non-profit, carsharing co-op in southern Ontario, that was founded in 1998. It ran into financial trouble and was acquired by Vrtucar on 27 March 2018.

They operated in Waterloo Region, Hamilton, Guelph, St. Catharines, London, and Brampton.

The co-op was founded in 1998, as Ontario's first carsharing program, under the name The People's Car Co-operative Inc.. At the 2014 AGM, the members of the co-op voted to change the incorporated name to Community CarShare Co-operative, Inc.

== History ==
=== Founding years 1998-2005 ===
Community CarShare began in Waterloo Region on April 1, 1998. It was started by a group of 10 friends who had a car donated to them, but didn't want to deal with the costs of car ownership. The first car was located in the City of Waterloo, near the corner of Bridgeport and Peppler street.

=== Local expansion 2005-2009 ===
In Fall 2007, the co-op expanded its service into Cambridge when it added a tenth vehicle to the fleet. As part of the growth into Cambridge, the organization updated its operating name from The People's Car Co-op to Grand River CarShare, to reflect the environmental benefits of carsharing and to localize the name of the co-op.

=== Province wide expansion 2009-2014 ===
In April 2009, the co-op's geographic borders expanded again when a group of Hamiltonians decided to join the co-op and expand service to that city under the co-op's second operating name, Hamilton CarShare. In less than five months, 50 new members were recruited, and three vehicles were launched in Hamilton in September 2009. Expansion to St. Catharines and Guelph in 2013 led to the adoption of the name Community CarShare in order to simplify the use of the name and convey the values of the organization.

There are currently 76 vehicles available to members, with the majority of them located in Kitchener-Waterloo. The fleet includes many vehicles such as the Toyota Yaris, Corolla, Matrix, Prius C, plug-in Prius, Tacoma, the fully electric Mitsubishi i-MiEV, a Ford Transit Connect cargo van, Mazda 5 station wagon, and Dodge Caravan mini van.

=== Rural expansion ===
Community CarShare expanded to rural Elmira (population ~8,000 people) north of Waterloo. All vehicles in the fleet equipped with winter tires and can be delivered to a specific location.

=== Sale ===
As the original Ontario region carsharing service, it was sold to Canada's largest one, Communauto, and its Ontario subsidiary, Vrtucar, on 27 March 2018.

== See also ==
- AutoShare - Toronto-based carshare program
- CarSharing Association - Industry association of which Community CarShare was a member
