= Maven =

A maven is an expert. A Yiddish word, deriving from the modern Hebrew conjugation of the verb "lehavin" in its 3rd person singular in the present tense (masculine) – "mevin" (מֵבִין) – which means "to understand, to comprehend". The term may also refer to:

== Science and technology ==
- Apache Maven, a software tool for build automation, primarily in Java
- MAVEN, an orbiter mission to Mars
- Maven (Scrabble), a Scrabble-playing algorithm
- Project Maven, a US Department of Defense project using artificial intelligence for drone targeting

== Other uses ==
- Maven (car sharing), a former carsharing service of General Motors
- Maven Networks, a multimedia company acquired by Yahoo!
- Mitsubishi Maven, a rebadged Suzuki APV minivan sold in Indonesia from 2005 to 2009

== People ==
- Fred Mavin or Maven (1884–1957), English football player and manager
- Maven (wrestler) (born 1976), American professional wrestler
- Maven Maurer (born 1975), Canadian former professional football player
- Max Maven (1950–2022), American magician and mentalist
- Ryan Clark (musician), American metal singer

== See also ==
- Mavin (disambiguation)
