= Bundesverband CarSharing =

Bundesverband CarSharing e.V. (BCS, sometimes stylized as bcs) is the industry association of the traditional car sharing organisations in Germany. BCS represents the political interests of the car sharing industry on a regional and national level, collaborates with other transport organisations and offers general information and publicity for car sharing. BCS also provides services to its members, like market research, and publishes yearly statistical data on the car sharing industry in Germany, which also include the car sharing organisations which are not member of BCS.

The BCS has, as of January 1, 2012, 85 member organisations of very different sizes, ranging from the Stadtmobil group with about 1500 cars at 640 stations and 35,000 registered users and Flinkster as another mayor player in Germany to the Glonner Autoteiler with 1 car and 5 users. Most member organisations trace their roots back to the early 1990s, where private initiatives looking for 'ecological' and 'alternative' sustainable transport solutions formed the first car sharing organisations. Besides car-sharing organisations themselves, BCS includes organisations active around car sharing and befriended organisations in its membership.

The new car sharing companies formed by automobile makers car2go (Daimler AG), DriveNow (joint venture of BMW and Sixt) and Quicar (VW), who enter the car-sharing market by flooding a given city with hundreds of cars exclusively of their own brands, are not members of bcs.

The seat of the association is Berlin. The governing board is composed (since May 2012) of Bernd Kremer, Christian Reining, Niklas Wachholtz, and Gisela Warmke.

BCS is member of the Verband Deutscher Verkehrsunternehmen (VDV), the industry association of public transit and transport in Germany and of the International Association of Public Transport (Union Internationale des Transports Publics, UITP), the world association of public transport organisations.

== See also ==
- CarSharing Association
