= Uber Carshare =

Australian carsharing company

- Type: Subsidiary
- Industry: Transportation
- Founded: 2012, in Sydney, NSW, Australia
- Founder: Will Davies, David Trumbull, and Chloe Iliffe
- Defunct: 12 September 2024
- Fate: Operational difficulties relating to insurance and theft risk.
- Headquarters: Sydney, NSW, Australia
- Area served: Sydney, Melbourne, Brisbane, Perth, Adelaide, Tasmania, Canberra, Gold Coast, Sunshine Coast, Newcastle
- Key people: Will Davies (Founder & CEO) & , Dave Trumbull (Founder & CTO), Chloe Iliffe (Founder), Merryn Clancy (COO)
- Services: Peer-to-peer carsharing
- Parent: Uber
- Website: www.ubercarshare.com

Uber Carshare was an Australian company that facilitated peer-to-peer car rental, a system by which individuals may rent privately owned vehicles on an hourly or daily basis to other registered users of the service.

== History ==
Established in 2012 as Car Next Door, it operated in all Australian capital cities as well as the Gold Coast, Sunshine Coast and Newcastle.

Caltex Australia (later Ampol) invested A$2.5 million in the company in 2016. Ampol sold its 17.2% interest for A$16.7 million on 24 December 2021.

Hyundai invested in the company in 2019, and listed a number of its electric Ioniq vehicles for sharing through the platform.

On 20 January 2022, the company was acquired by Uber for an undisclosed sum, but believed to be $105 million. This was Uber's first Australian acquisition. The company continued operating independently following Uber's takeover with co-founder Will Davies as the chief executive until November 2022, when it was rebranded as Uber Carshare.

In August 2024, Uber announced that Uber Carshare would cease operations in the following month citing rising costs and 'operational challenges'.

== See also ==
- Alternatives to car use
- Car rental
- Carsharing
- Carpooling
- Collaborative consumption
