= Maven (car sharing) =

Car sharing service from General Motors

- Industry: Automotive service industry
- Defunct: 2020
- Headquarters: Detroit, Michigan
- Areas served: United States; Canada; Australia
- Key people: Sigal Cordeiro, Vice President of Maven and GM Urban Mobility
- Services: Car sharing Peer-to-peer car sharing Gig rentals
- Parent: General Motors

Maven was a car sharing service launched by General Motors (GM) in 2016. It provided services such as carsharing and peer-to-peer car sharing for personal use and also rented to drivers of gig economy professions such as Uber and Lyft. It operated in select cities in the United States, Canada and Australia until ceasing operations in 2020.

== History ==
Maven was announced in January 2016 and has been referred to as the AirBnB for cars. At the time of its launch, Maven's team consisted of 40 people. The year prior, GM had purchased the assets of then defunct Sidecar after that company failed to gain ground on Lyft and Uber.

Maven launched as a pilot program at the University of Michigan at Ann Arbor and expanded to other cities a few weeks later. In August 2017, Maven was announced as the exclusive car sharing partner for the University of Southern California in Los Angeles. Maven also launched Maven Gig, a rental service for people who work in the gig economy such as drivers of Uber, Lyft, and Uber Eats.

By 2018, Maven had 190,000 members and expanded to major cities across the United States. It had also entered the Australian market where it initially provided gig-economy rentals prior to adding personal car sharing services. It operated in a total of 17 cities in North America as of May 2019. Maven exited select cities in 2019 based on market analysis by GM, and announced it would focus on cities with the strongest demand and growth. Maven also partnered with EVgo in 2019 to provide fast charging stations for users of Maven electric vehicles. On April 21, 2020, GM announced plans to shut down Maven.

== Services ==
Maven provided car sharing services, including car sharing for personal use and rentals for drivers of gig economy professions such as Uber and Lyft. It used an app for people to search for and book rentals. It is also used to control certain features of the car such as remote start and unlocking of doors.

Unlike traditional rental car agencies, all Maven vehicles were connected by the General Motors-owned OnStar telematics service, which allowed borrowers to use the service to contact roadside assistance, receive directions to the vehicle's infotainment system, and perform remote services via the Maven app, such as unlocking, locking, and locating the vehicle on a map. Most vehicles also included complimentary SiriusXM Satellite Radio service. Maven offered three main vehicle classes, consisting of Small Cars (such as the Chevrolet Spark, Chevrolet Sonic, Chevrolet Cruze, and Chevrolet Volt), Large Cars (such as the Buick Regal, Cadillac ATS, Chevrolet Impala, and Chevrolet Malibu), and SUV's (such as the Cadillac Escalade, Chevrolet Equinox, Chevrolet Tahoe, and Chevrolet Trax).

Maven also allowed individual owners of General Motors vehicles to share their cars by the hour or daily through a peer-to-peer car sharing service. Owners received sixty percent of the rental cost and also received liability insurance. Vehicles had to be newer model GM vehicles and go through an on-boarding process which included installation of a keyless entry system.

Maven Gig was launched in 2017 and rented vehicles to people who worked in the gig economy such as drivers of Uber, Lyft, and Uber Eats.
