= City CarShare =

Carsharing program in California, US

City Carshare
- Merged into: Getaround
- Successor: Getaround
- Formation: 2001; 25 years ago
- Founded at: San Francisco, California, U.S.
- Dissolved: November 2016; 9 years ago
- Type: Non-profit
- Services: Carsharing
- Key people: Rick Hutchinson (CEO)
- Affiliations: CarSharing Association

City Carshare was a carsharing program that operated in the San Francisco Bay Area, starting in 2001. It rented vehicles by the hour. In November 2016, the company effectively ceased operations, when Getaround, a for-profit, carsharing company, took over City CarShare's fleet, parking spaces, and member base.

== History ==
At its inception in 2001, City CarShare was the only carsharing program in the San Francisco area. By 2002, the company expanded to Oakland, Berkeley, and Palo Alto. In 2004, City Carshare sold off cars from its fleet in favor of using shared vehicles.

In 2011, City CarShare was one of eighteen organizations to form the North American CarSharing Association, the world's largest. City CarShare was one of the lead organizations in the new association, which had 100,000 members upon its launch. In 2011, City CarShare also partnered with the city of San Francisco to provide on-street parking exclusively for City CarShare vehicles.

In November 2016, City CarShare reached an agreement with Getaround, where Getaround took over City CarShare's fleet, parking spaces and member base.
