= Claire Morissette =

Canadian cycling activist (1950–2007)

Claire Morissette (April 6, 1950 – July 20, 2007) was a Canadian cycling advocate who fought for equal cyclists' rights in Montreal since 1976. She was a member of the group Le Monde à Bicyclette. Notable were the stunts they organized to raise consciousness of automobile transportation's negative impact on cities and their inhabitants, such as bringing snow skis and toboggans on subways to protest the exclusion of bicycles and a die-in on the corner of St. Catherine and University streets in which 100 people lay in the street adorned with fake blood and surrounded with wrecked bikes.

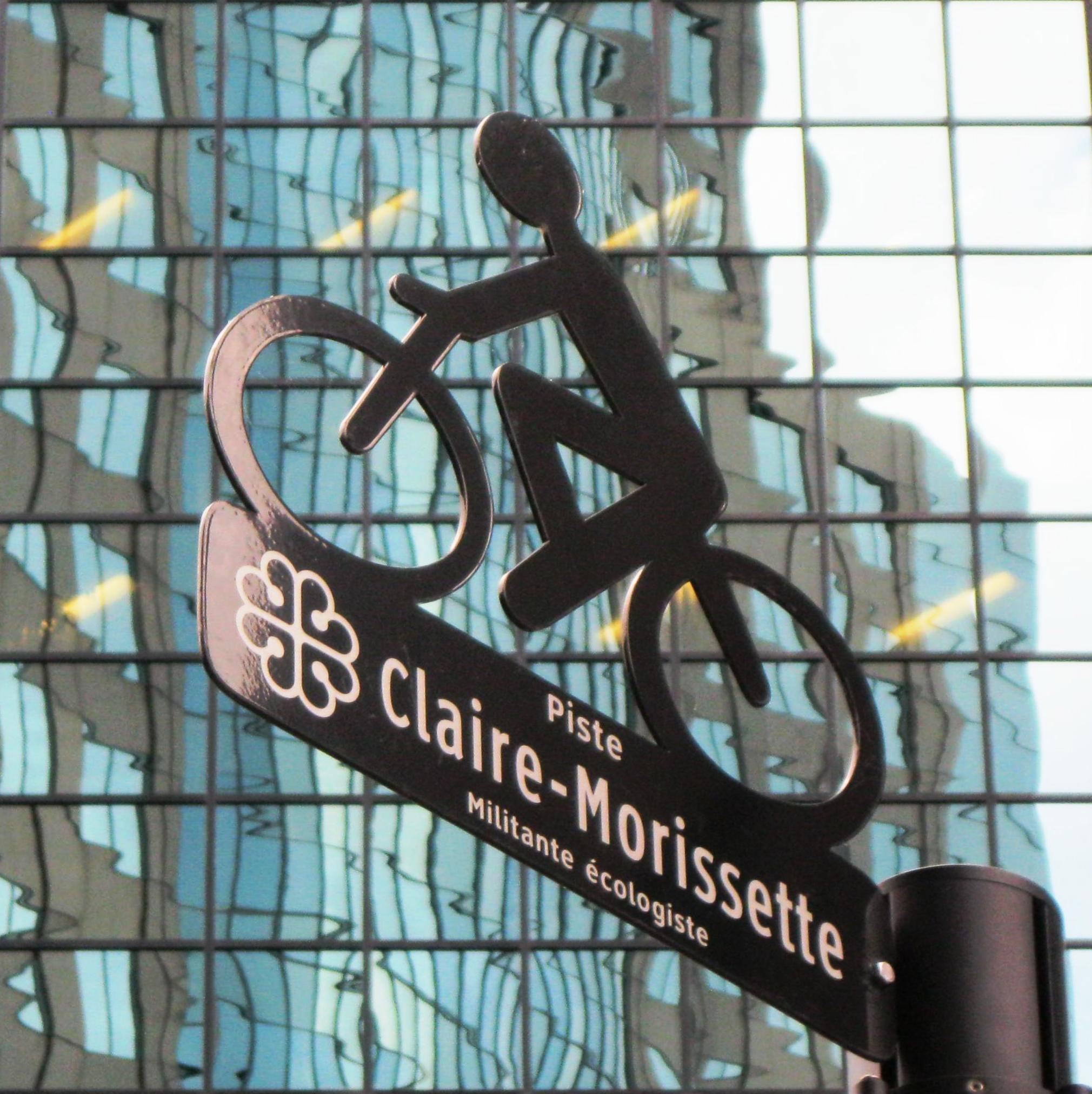
Sign for Claire-Morissette bicycle path on Maisonneuve Boulevard

She published a book in 1994, Deux roues, un avenir (Two Wheels, One Future), available only in French. The book promotes using bikes for urban transportation. In the same year, she also founded Communauto, a car-share company.

In 1999, she founded Cyclo Nord-Sud, an organization that gives used bikes to third world countries. They have shipped over 20,000 bikes to 13 countries.

She died on July 20, 2007, aged 57, following a battle with breast cancer. In her honor, on June 16, 2008, Montreal's city council voted unanimously to name its De Maisonneuve Boulevard bicycle path after Morissette.

== Bibliography ==
- Deux roues, un avenir : le vélo en ville (Two Wheels, One Future)(1994), écosociété. ISBN 978-2-923165-55-4

== Awards ==
- 2007 - Prix Thérèse-Daviau (awarded posthumously)
- 2017 - Honored in the exhibition "Place aux femmes" at City Hall as part of Montreal's 375th anniversary
