= Getaround =

Carsharing service

- Traded as: OTC Pink Current: GETR
- Industry: Carsharing
- Founded: September 9, 2009; 16 years ago San Francisco, California, U.S.
- Founders: Sam Zaid; Jessica Scorpio; Elliot Kroo
- Headquarters: San Francisco, California, U.S.
- Area served: France, Germany, Spain, Austria, Belgium, the U.K., Norway, and the Netherlands.
- Services: Carsharing
- Number of employees: 550
- Website: getaround.com

Getaround was an online car sharing or peer-to-peer carsharing service that connected drivers who needed to rent cars with car owners who rented their private cars in exchange for payment. The company was founded in 2011 at the TechCrunch Disrupt conference. In June 2026, Getaround's board announced its plan to dissolve and liquidate the company.

Before ceasing US operations on Feb 12, 2025, the company operated in Boston, Chicago, San Francisco Bay Area, New Jersey, Portland, Seattle, Philadelphia, Miami, Orlando, Atlanta, San Diego, Los Angeles, Denver, and Washington D.C. In April 2026, the company sold its remaining interests in Europe to GoMore, a Danish company.

== History ==
Getaround was founded in 2009 by Sam Zaid, Jessica Scorpio, and Elliot Kroo. In May 2011, Getaround won the TechCrunch Disrupt New York competition. In 2012, Getaround began serving Portland, Oregon with the aid of a $1.725 million grant from the Federal Highway Administration.

In November 2016, Getaround reached an agreement with City CarShare to take over its fleet, parking spaces, and member base.

In August 2018, Getaround raised $300 million from Softbank.

In April 2019, Getaround purchased the car-sharing platform Drivy for $300 million and rebranded the company as Getaround six months later.

In May 2022, Getaround announced an agreement to merge with a special purpose acquisition company (SPAC) to start selling shares of the organization on the New York Stock Exchange. Listed as GETR, the company would have a equity value of $1.2 billion.

On February 11, 2025, Getaround announced the cessation of its U.S. operations while maintaining its European business, citing liquidity challenges. The decision affected both its car-sharing and HyreCar operations in the United States.

=== Financial difficulties ===
In January 2020, The Information reported the company planned to lay off approximately 150 staff members or about 25 percent of its workforce. In March 2020, Bloomberg News reported that demand had dropped due to the COVID-19 pandemic, and that the company was short on cash and looking for a buyer.

Getaround’s 2022 SPAC merger valued the company at $1.2 billion, but the company's stock soon fell, and by 2024 the company's market cap was roughly $24 million. In February 2024, Getaround laid off 30 percent of its staff, this after the company vacated its San Francisco headquarters in 2023. In July 2024, the company's stock was delisted from the NYSE and transferred to the OTC Markets.

== Criminal use ==
Criminals have used Getaround, along with other peer-to-peer car rental services such as Turo, for illegal activities. In February 2020, the Washington Post reported that thieves were finding available cars using the Getaround mobile app, which displayed the exact locations of vehicles for rent. Victims have reported that thieves could break into a car, destroy the Getaround Connect device that is intended to immobilize the car and report its position, and take the keys that had been locked inside the vehicle. Of the 787 cars stolen in the District of Columbia between October 1, 2019, and February 4, 2020, the Metropolitan Police Department of the District of Columbia estimated that 49 of the thefts involved car rental apps such as Getaround. In July 2021, the Attorney General for the District of Columbia announced a settlement with Getaround that required Getaround to pay the district $950,000, to pay restitution to users whose vehicles had been damaged or stolen, and to make other changes to its platform.

In February 2020, NBC News interviewed eight Getaround users whose cars had been stolen, damaged, seized by police as evidence, or otherwise misused. Many of the owners were not fully compensated by Getaround's insurance for their losses. A former Getaround employee told NBC News that the company has known since 2017 that its GPS tracking devices were not tamper-proof.
