= GoCar (carsharing) =

Carsharing service in Ireland

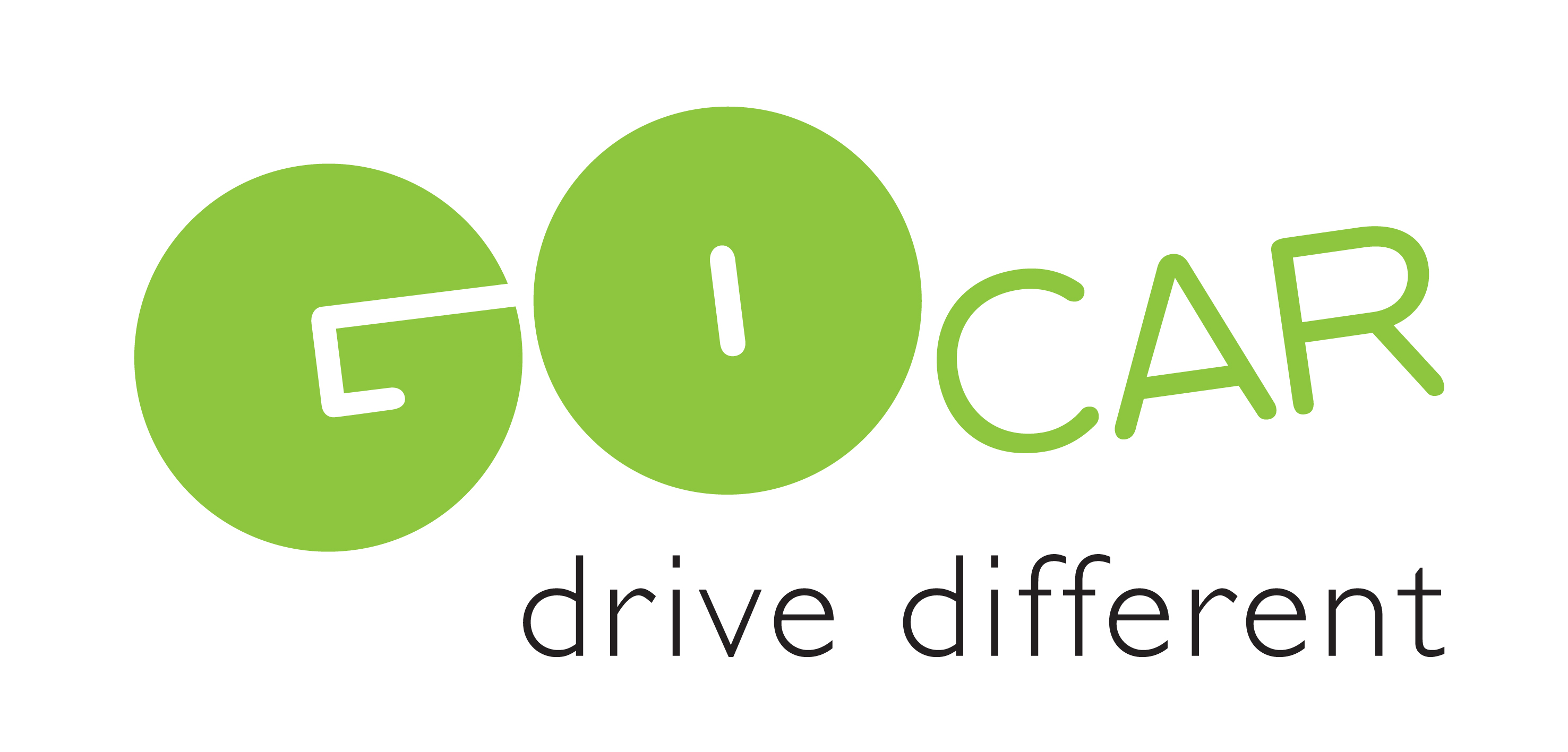
- Industry: Carsharing
- Founded: May 2008
- Headquarters: Dublin, Ireland
- Number of locations: 600+
- Area served: Republic of Ireland
- Key people: Joe Quirke, Sean Cody
- Website: gocar.ie

GoCar is a carsharing service in Ireland. GoCar members can book cars online or via the app and unlock with their phone. GoCar operates a fleet of over 1,100 vehicles across Ireland. It launched in Cork in September 2008, with the support of Cork City Council as a pilot scheme. Cork City Council gave GoCar use of 3 car parking locations in Cork City as part of a wider pilot scheme.

== History ==
GoCar launched in September 2008 in partnership with Cambio CarSharing, one of Europe's largest Carsharing providers. In June 2012, GoCar was relaunched in the Mansion House Dublin by the Lord Mayor of Dublin, Andrew Montague. GoCar announced that it had received significant funding from the owners of Irish Car Rentals which would allow the company expand to having 200 cars on the road by the end of 2013.

=== Dublin City Council bye-laws ===
On 1 August 2013, Dublin City Council's new bye-laws in relation to car clubs came into effect. GoCar was presented with the city's first on-street Car Club licence on the same day. To coincide with the announcement of this development, GoCar increased its number of cars in Dublin to 50, with 31 of these cars availing of the new on-street licence in 32 locations around Dublin.

The bye-laws enable GoCars with this licence to be parked anywhere in the city without being liable to pay parking charges.

"Dublin City Council wants Car Clubs operating from on-street parking spaces because we believe they will play an important role in improving traffic management in the city. Research shows that the number of miles people drive goes down and there is an increase in walking and cycling as Car Clubs become established." (Dublin's Lord Mayor Oisín Quinn)
