= Mavin =

Mavin may refer to:

- Fred Mavin (1884–1957), English football player and manager
- Steve Mavin (born 1968), Australian rugby league footballer
- Mavin Manyshaped, heroine of three science fiction novels by Sheri S. Tepper
- Mavin, Qazvin, Iran, a village
- Mavin Records, a Nigerian-based record label established in 2012
- Mavin Foundation, an American community organization for mixed-heritage people

== See also ==
- Maven (disambiguation)
