= JustShareIt =

- Company type: Private
- Industry: Car rental, Car sharing
- Founded: 2012; San Francisco, California
- Founder: Gaurav Kohli
- Headquarters: San Francisco, California
- Area served: Nationwide in the U.S.
- Key people: Gaurav Kohli (Founder) & (CTO)
- Services: Car rental, Car sharing
- Website: justshareit.com

JustShareIt was a peer-to-peer car rental and car sharing marketplace. It allowed individuals to rent vehicles directly from individual car owners or car sharing companies in local neighborhood locations.

== Acquisition ==
JustShareIt was launched on January 5, 2012. It was acquired by Fox Rent a Car in March, 2017.

== See also ==
- Car rental
- Car Sharing
- Peer-to-peer carsharing
