= Cambio CarSharing =

German carsharing company

cambio Carsharing
- Type: Limited commercial partnership (Kommanditgesellschaft)
- Industry: Carsharing and support for carsharing-companies
- Founded: 2000
- Headquarters: Bremen, Germany
- Key people: Joachim Schwarz
- Revenue: >20,6 Millions € (2014)
- Number of employees: >180
- Website: cambio-carsharing.com

Cambio CarSharing is a carsharing company which was formed in 2000 as a merger of several carsharing companies in different cities in Germany and Belgium. Cambio is a member of Bundesverband CarSharing e.V. (bcs), the industry association of the traditional car sharing organisations in Germany.

== Key figures and locations ==
Currently, the Cambio-group in Germany and Belgium has over 63,500 customers and provides more than 1,700 vehicles at 600 stations. The group is one of the three largest carsharing companies in Germany.

The locations of Cambio in Germany are Aachen, Berlin, Bielefeld, Bonn, Bremen, Bremerhaven, Cologne, Hamburg, Jülich, Lüneburg, Oldenburg, Saarbrücken, Uelzen, Winsen and Wuppertal.

The Cambio locations in Belgium in 39 cities, for example: Arlon, Antwerp, Bruges, Brussels, Chiny, Charleroi, Ghent, Hasselt, Kortrijk, Leuven, Lier, Liège, Mechelen, Mons, Namur, Ostend, Ottignies, Turnhout and Zwijndrecht.

Cambio partners with the Stadtmobil group so that customers of both groups can "cross book" cars at most locations (in Germany) of the other group, using the same smart card.

== Using of vehicles ==
The vehicles can be booked by customers via the internet or by telephone at any time. The travel time can be between one hour and 30 days. Depending on the station and the type of car, bookings with no end time specified are possible. The booking is transferred within minutes to the vehicle station. At the station, the key safe or vehicle can be opened with a customer's smart card and after returning the car, the trip-data for billing is transferred automatically to headquarters. The number of kilometers driven and the trip time are calculated. Fuel, car insurance, taxes, maintenance and depreciation are included.

== History ==
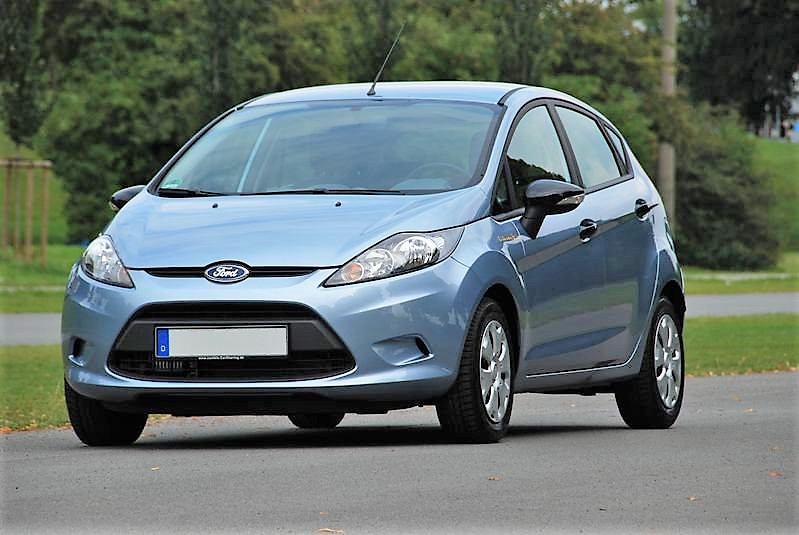
cambio (CarSharing) car in Bremen, Germany

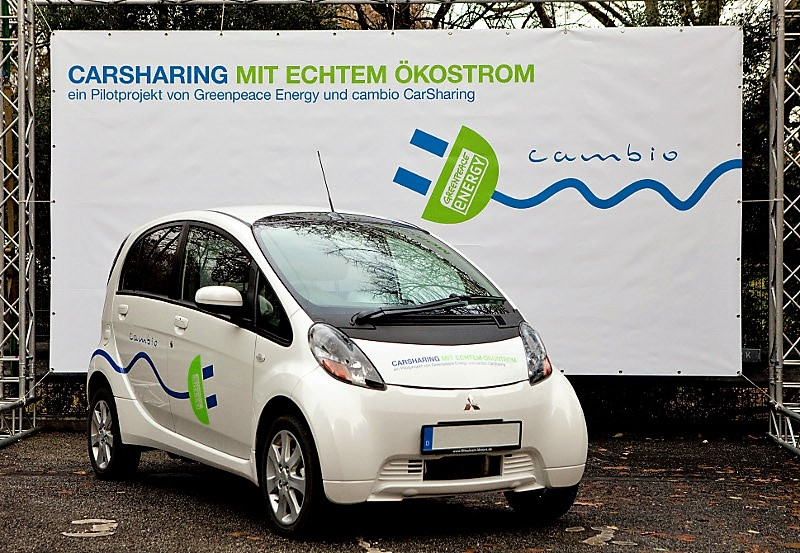
cambio (CarSharing) Electric vehicle in Hamburg and Cologne, Germany

The cambio Mobility Services GmbH & Co. KG was founded in 2000 by the merger of carsharing company StadtteilAutoAachen, StadtAuto Bremen and Stadtauto Köln. StadtAuto Bremen and Stadtteilauto Aachen worked separately since 1990, Stadtauto Köln since 1992.

In 2000, Stadtteilauto Aachen brought a newly formed subsidiary into the group, the Saarmobil Carsharing GmbH. In October 2001, the Bielefeld carsharing company CityMobil joined the cambio Group.

In April 2003, the Oldenburg carsharing-club StadtTeilAuto was changed to cambio Oldenburg and also in 2003 cambio Hamburg was opened. cambio Belgium has been in Wallonia since 2000, since 2003 in Brussels, and since 2004 in Flanders. cambio Belgium has about 54,699 customers and 1826 cars at 668 stations (December 2021).

Since 2008, cambio exists in Berlin and under the name GoCar in Ireland (Dublin and Cork).

Cambio has developed in recent years from a series of acquisitions including Campus Mobile in 2009 and Carriba of the Stadtwerke Wuppertal in 2010 (and continued the service under its own brand)

Since March 2011, cambio and Greenpeace Energy have provided fully electric vehicles, which are usable in the city of Hamburg. The vehicles are charged from the surplus energy of 100% renewable energy power plants. In Cologne, electric vehicles will be offered from March 2012.

== Awards ==
In 2010, the company's service in the cities of Aachen, Bielefeld and Cologne were awarded with the "Service-Test Engel des ADAC NRW".

In May 2011 the company was awarded for "environmentally-friendly transport services" and received the "blauen Engel" and in November opened two carsharing stations in Bonn.

== Divisions ==
The cambio Mobility Services GmbH & Co. KG itself operates no carsharing service but provides central services, especially software and call center services, for all subsidiaries and partners. In 2005 the Carsharing Service GmbH (CSS) as a subsidiary was founded. The company offers, data processing and call centers for other carsharing companies.

CarSharing subsidiaries in Aachen, Berlin, Bielefeld, Bremen, Bremerhaven, Brussels, Flanders, Hamburg, Cologne, Lüneburg, Oldenburg, Saarbrücken, Wallonia, and Wuppertal. There are various types of vehicles from small cars to vans, in five price classes, and which can be booked by the hour, on a daily or weekly basis, on the spur of the moment or far in advance.
