= Stadtmobil =

Carsharing network in Germany

- Industry: Carsharing
- Founded: 1999; Karlsruhe, Stuttgart
- Headquarters: Karlsruhe
- Area served: Germany (Karlsruhe, Hanover and Stuttgart)
- Services: Carsharing
- Website: www.stadtmobil.de

Stadtmobil is a carsharing company in Germany, actually a group of seven regional companies with a common brand, common marketing, common website, reservation system, and common development of software and car access technology.

== History ==
The group was formed in 1999 by carsharing companies in Karlsruhe, the Rhine-Neckar Region and Stuttgart. The group was later joined by a company in Hanover. The regional companies in the Rhein-Main Region (around Frankfurt), Berlin and the Rhine-Ruhr Agglomeration were created out of the group. Stadtmobil is a member of Bundesverband CarSharing e.V. (bcs), the industry association of the traditional car sharing organisations in Germany.

Stadtmobil is the largest car sharing organisation among the bcs members with 1,800 cars at about 800 stations and 38,000 subscribers. Stadtmobil claims to be the market leader of car sharing in Germany, based on achieving a turnover of 10 million euros in 2010 with 1500 cars.

The seven Stadtmobil regional companies offer their own tariffs, charging per hour and per kilometer, according to car type from "mini" to "comfort" and "bus" or "transporter". Different tariff models are offered with a low monthly subscription rate but higher usage fares vs. higher monthly subscription rate with lower usage fares. In some regions like Rhein-Main, Stadtmobil also offers a special tariff for holders of a year pass of the regional public transit authority.

Stadtmobil cooperates with Cambio CarSharing and five other local car sharing organisations offering cross-booking of cars at stations of the other companies using their respective user-id and access card from their "home" organisation at stations and cars at the other organization. The local tariffs of the "home" organization apply and the charges are invoiced from the "home" organisation.

The cars are located at fixed locations where they are to be picked up and placed back. Access to the cars is either via key boxes or directly via computers in the cars. RFID cards serve to open the key boxes or car doors. Holders of a RFID based year pass of the Rhein-Main Verkehrsverbund shall soon be able to use this card to get access to car or car key.

While car wash and maintenance are done by Stadtmobil employees, customers are asked to keep the cars clean and to fill the fuel tank at the pump when the gauge indicates that the tank is less than a quarter full. A fuel card is in the car and allows buying fuel without cash at the stations of some designated fuel brands. The car won't start up without the fuel card plugged in the card reader of the car computer.
