= Mondo Ride =

Kenyan vehicle for hire company

- Industry: Transport
- Founded: 2015; 11 years ago)
- Headquarters: Dubai, United Arab Emirates
- Number of locations: 2 countries, 3 cities (February 2016)
- Website: mondoride.com

Mondo Ride is a multinational vehicle for hire company founded in UAE by Troels Andersen (chief executive officer) and Mo Shahin (chief technology officer) and based in Nairobi, Kenya. The firm operates the Mondo ride mobile app which allows consumers to use their smartphones to request transport which is then routed to Mondo Ride drivers. The company was formed in 2015 by Himanshu Anand. As of 29 February 2016, the service was available in Kenya. In February 2018, there were fears that the company was exiting the country when accounts were suspended due to a delay in payments.

In 2016, the company started operations in Nairobi, Kenya, where it competes primarily with Uber. It operates in Nairobi, Mombasa, Kampala, Kisumu and Dar es Salaam in Tanzania. Its corporate transportation offering has more than 100 clients across the region.
