= Uhaul Car Share =

Former carsharing service

UhaulCarShare
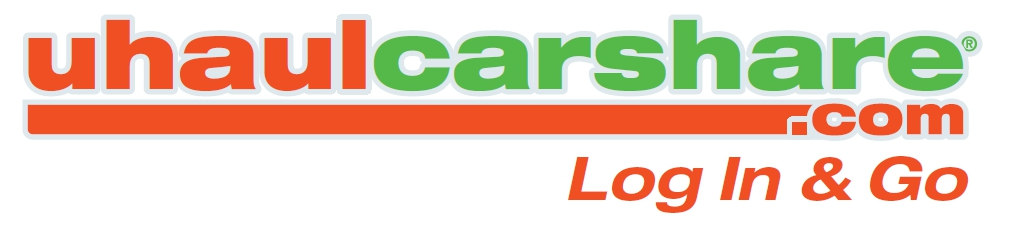

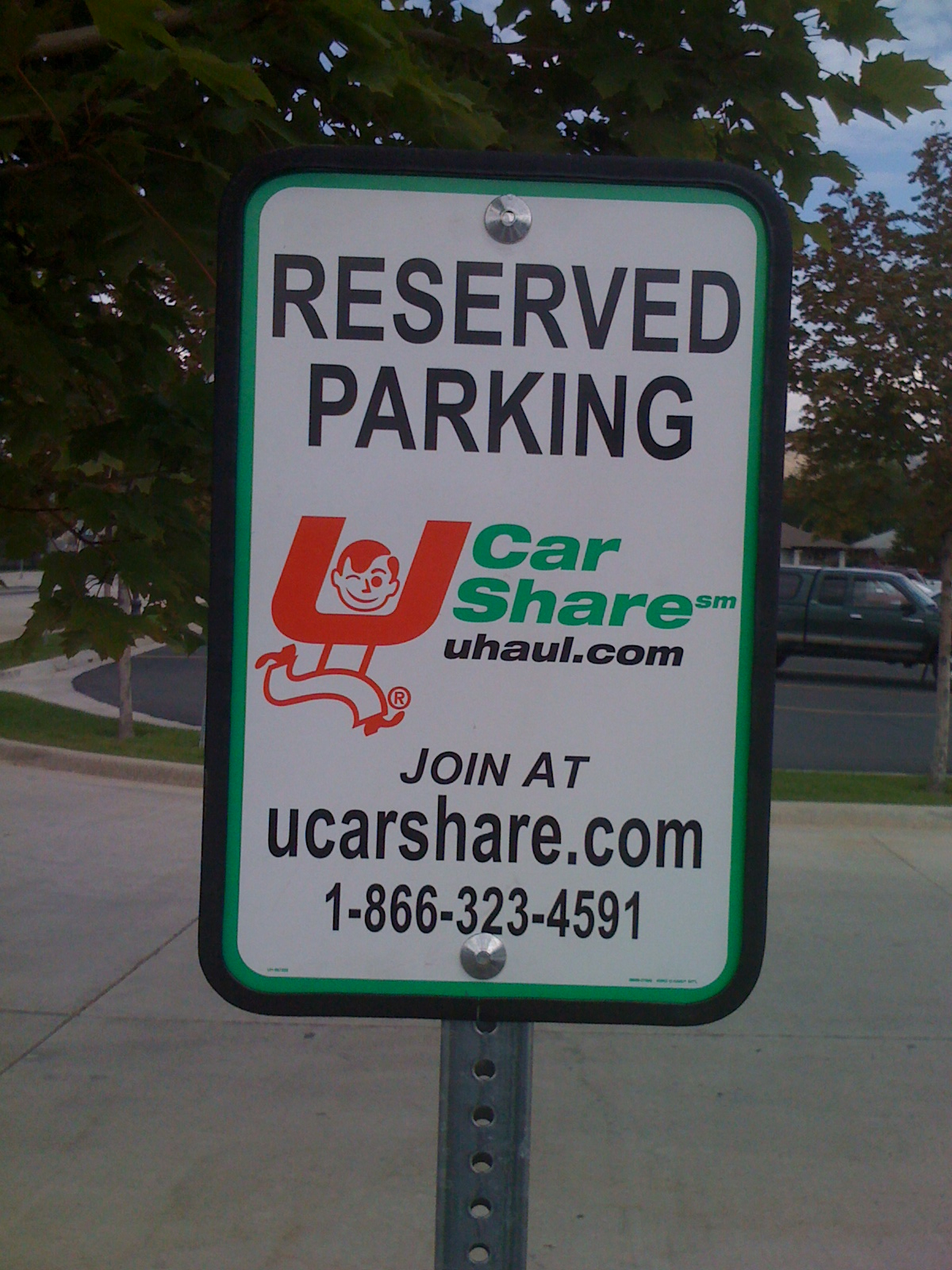
- Reserved parking spot for Uhaul Car Share
- Company type: Subsidiary
- Industry: Car rental
- Founded: 2007
- Headquarters: Phoenix, Arizona, US
- Area served: 30
- Services: Carsharing
- Owner: U-Haul
- Parent: U-Haul
- Website: Archived 2018-07-03 at the Wayback Machine

Uhaul Car Share (formerly U Car Share) was an American for-profit carsharing service offered by U-Haul in nearly 40 cities in the United States until the program was shut down in February 2020 just ahead of the COVID-19 pandemic. Those with a UhaulCarShare membership had use of a car, billable by the hour or by the day. However, use was limited to three days at a time. Most often, Uhaul Car Share vehicles were operated in communities with colleges and/or universities nearby. "The goal of [Uhaul] Car Share [was] to give people an alternative to owning second and third cars, and to increase the use of public transit".

UhaulCarShare's primary competitor was Zipcar (which, since 2007, includes the former Flexcar).
