= Modo (car co-op) =

Carsharing cooperative in British Columbia, Canada

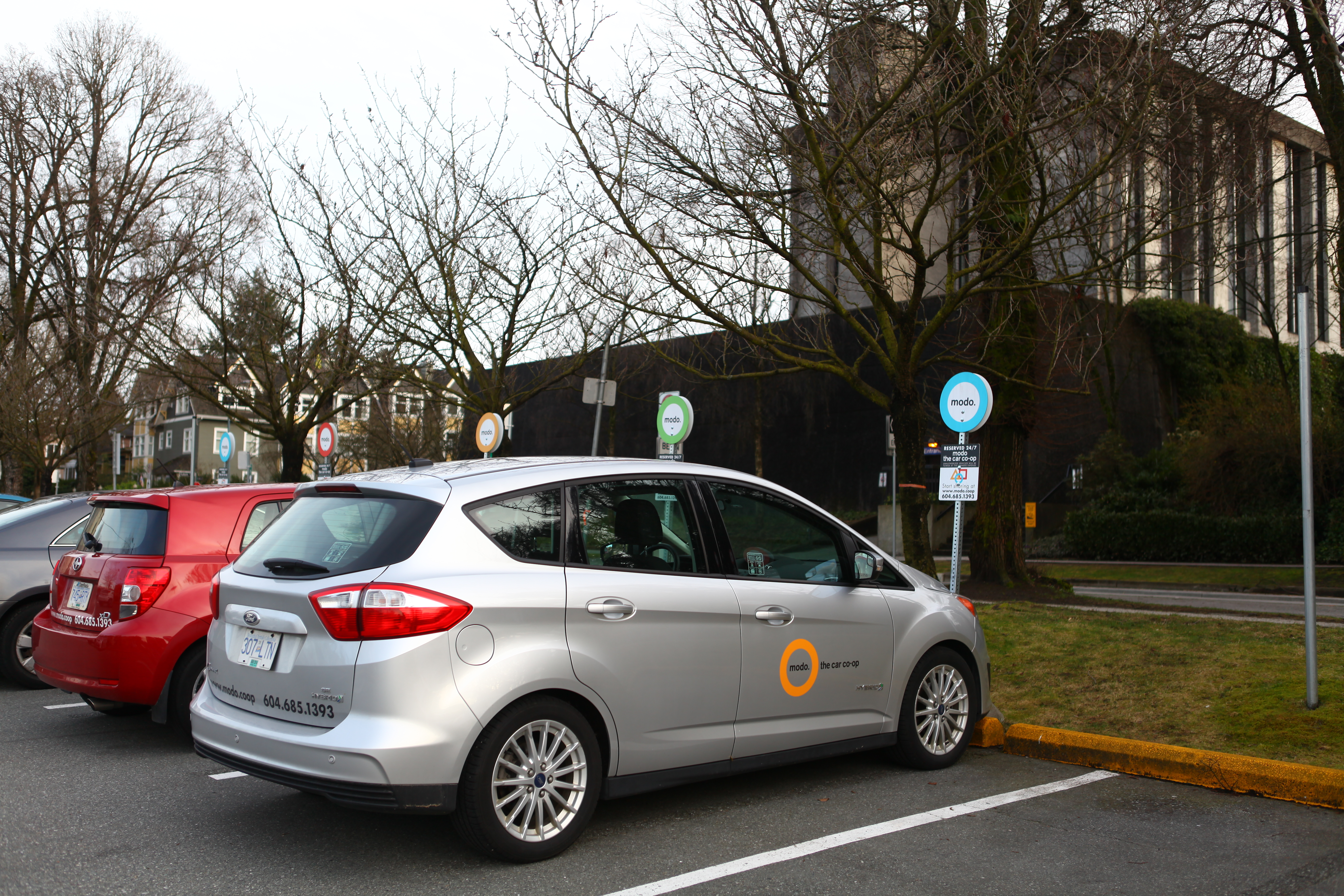
- Formerly: The Co-operative Auto Network
- Type: Cooperative
- Industry: Carsharing
- Founded: January 1997 in Vancouver, British Columbia
- Headquarters: 200-470 Granville Street, Vancouver; 311-895 Fort Street, Victoria
- Area served: Greater Vancouver, Greater Victoria, Nanaimo, Kelowna, Langdale, Squamish
- Website: modo.coop

Modo is a member-owned carshare operator in British Columbia. It was incorporated in 1997, making it the oldest car-sharing organization in the area, the first carshare co-op in North America and the first carshare in the English-speaking world. Modo amalgamated with the Victoria Carshare Co-op in 2015 and now serves 25 municipalities in the Lower Mainland and Greater Victoria.

As of 2023, Modo had over 30,000 individual and business members and a fleet of approximately 1000 vehicles, including cars, trucks, SUVs, passenger and cargo vans, hybrids, battery electric vehicles and hydrogen fuel cell vehicles. Modo has vehicles across British Columbia, including Vancouver, UBC, Richmond, Surrey, New Westminster, Burnaby, North Vancouver, Coquitlam, Port Moody, Victoria, Oak Bay, Esquimalt and Saanich, and at the Horseshoe Bay, Tsawwassen, Langdale and Swartz Bay ferry terminals.

Modo offers two-way, roundtrip carsharing. Each of its vehicles has a designated parking space, with cars picked up and dropped off at the same location.

== History ==
- In October 2014, Victoria Car Share was merged into Modo. Then in June 2018, Modo acquired the Okanagan Car Share Co-op in Kelowna.
- In June 2017, Modo entered into a partnership with TransLink to provide vehicles for the transit authority's Vanpool pilot project.
- In July 2018, Modo began allowing drivers with learner's licenses to use its fleet of vehicles, making it the first carshare in North America to do so.
- In August 2018, Modo, along with Coast Car Co-op, became permanently located at the Langdale Ferry Terminal near Gibsons, British Columbia.
- In August 2023, Modo marked the launch of their 1,000th vehicle - a Hyundai IONIQ 5 EV.
- Since October 2024, Modo's CEO is Sandra Phillips, a renowned shared-mobility expert with previous experience at Car2Go and Evo Carshare.
