= Yandex.Drive =

Russian carsharing service

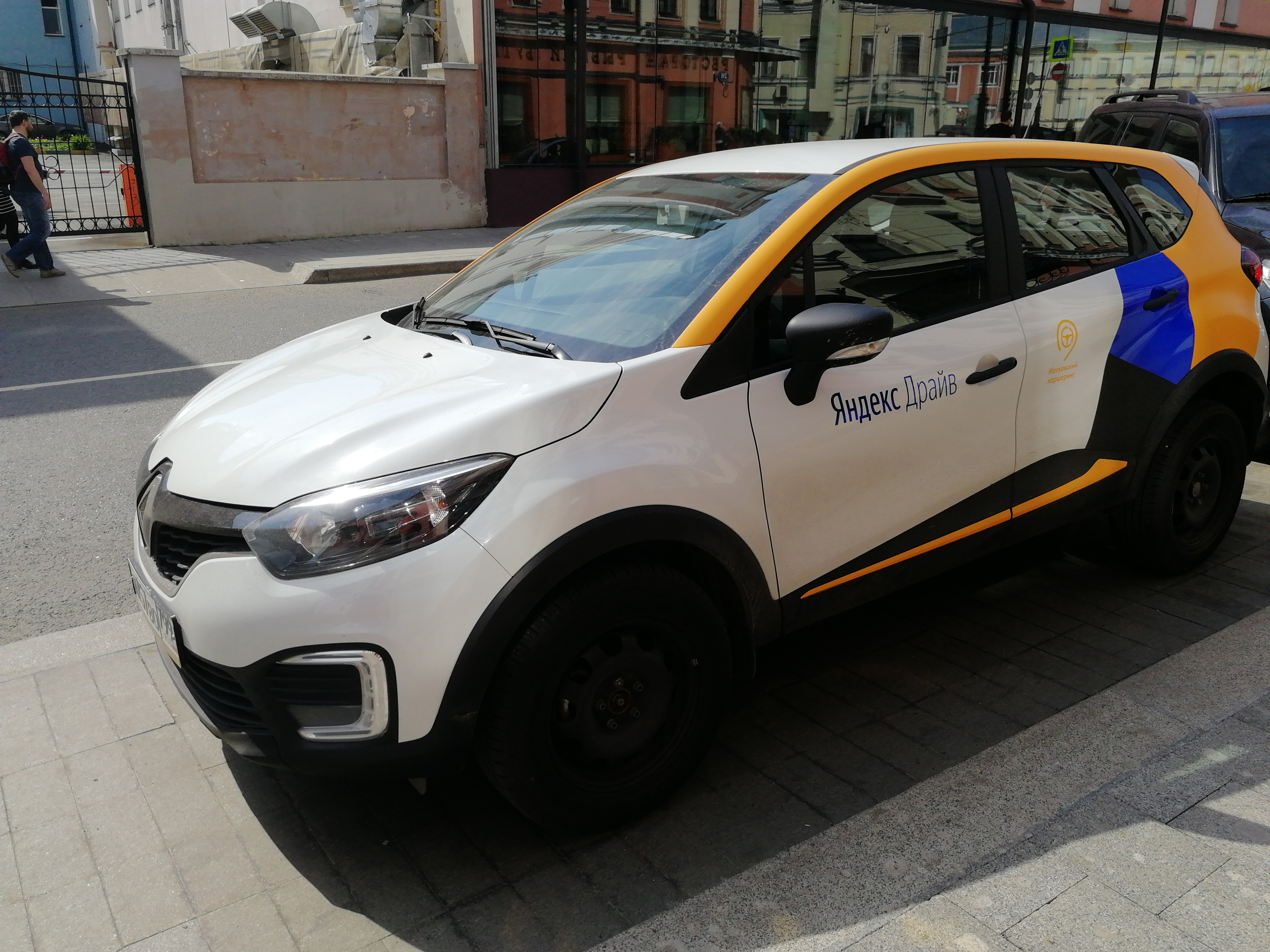
- One of Renault Captur cars of Yandex.Drive
- Founded: December 1, 2017; 8 years ago
- Number of locations: Moscow, Russia
- Website: yandex.ru/drive/

Yandex.Drive (Russian: Яндекс.Драйв, romanized: Yandeks.Drayv) is a Russian carsharing service owned by Yandex. The service offers short-term car rentals in Moscow, Moscow Oblast, Saint-Petersburg, Kazan and Sochi launched in February 2018.

== History ==
The service began operating on February 21, 2018 in Moscow with a fleet of 750 Kia Rio, Kia Rio X-Line and Renault Kaptur cars. "Drive" initially launched with a large fleet and was the first among Russian services to offer users dynamic pricing that takes into account the demand for cars and the situation on the road.

In January 2020, there were over 21000 vehicles in the fleet, making it the largest short term car rental company in the world.

The fleet of vehicles include the Kia Rio, Kia Rio X-Line, Renault Kaptur, Skoda Octavia, Skoda Rapid, Nissan Leaf, Nissan Qashqai, Audi A3, Audi Q3, Porsche Macan, Porsche 911 Carrera, Ford Mustang of 1965 and 1969, BMW 5 Series, Mercedes-Benz E-Class, Volkswagen Polo, Genesis G70, Citroen Jumpy and Volkswagen Transporter.

== See also ==
- Carsharing in Moscow
