= GoGet =

Car sharing service operating in Australia

GoGet CarShare
- Industry: Carsharing
- Founded: June 2003; Newtown, New South Wales
- Founder: Nic Lowe and Bruce Jeffreys and 10 other members
- Headquarters: Sydney
- Area served: Sydney, Melbourne and Brisbane
- Key people: Nic Lowe and Bruce Jeffreys
- Services: Carsharing
- Owner: CarShare Australia, Archer Capital
- Website: http://www.goget.com.au/

GoGet CarShare is a car sharing service operating in Sydney, Melbourne, and Brisbane. The service was the first of its kind in Australia. GoGet was launched as Newtown CarShare on 6 June 2003 with three vehicles and twelve founding members. Following interest from the City of Darebin, the service was extended to Melbourne under the name "GoGet" in November 2004. With the growth of the service to other areas in Sydney, Newtown CarShare was renamed GoGet in May 2005.

GoGet members choose a rate plan and pay an annual or monthly fee. Fees cover fuel, insurance, maintenance, and cleaning. The vehicles are mostly late-model hatchbacks, but also include vans, utes and premium vehicles. Each vehicle has a home location, referred to as a "pod", either in a car park or on a street, typically in a highly populated urban neighbourhood. Members reserve a car by web or telephone and use a key card to access the vehicle.

In June 2014, GoGet had over 1300 vehicles Australia-wide.

In October 2015, GoGet had over 65,000 members, which is estimated to take 100,000 cars off the road.

In October 2025, GoGet had over 200,000 members, making over 8 million trips on their fleet of over 3000 vehicles.
