= Turo (company) =

American peer-to-peer car rental company

Turo Inc.
- Formerly: RelayRides (2009–2015)
- Type: Private
- Industry: Car rental
- Founded: August 12, 2009; 17 years ago in Boston, Massachusetts, U.S.
- Founder: Shelby Clark
- Headquarters: Hunter–Dulin Building, San Francisco, California, U.S.
- Area served: Australia; Canada; France; United Kingdom; United States
- Key people: Andre Haddad (CEO)
- Revenue: ▲US$879.7 million (2023)
- Owner: IAC Inc. (31%)
- Number of employees: 931 (2023)
- Website: turo.com

Turo Inc. is an American car rental company based in San Francisco, California. The company operates a peer-to-peer car rental marketplace that allows private car owners to rent out their vehicles via an online and mobile interface. Turo operates in the United States, Canada, the United Kingdom, Australia, and France.

In July 2019, the American holding company IAC invested $250 million in Turo, a deal that valued the company at more than $1 billion. According to company filings, as of March 2024 the site had 360,000 active vehicle listings.

== History ==
Turo was launched as RelayRides in Boston in June 2010. The peer-to-peer car-sharing concept was inspired by similar online marketplaces such as Airbnb and eBay. In late 2010, the company expanded to San Francisco, where it is now headquartered. In 2012, it launched nationwide in the U.S.

Initially, renting a car through RelayRides required installing an in-car device that enabled GPS monitoring, remote unlocking, and smart card entry, similar to Zipcar. In 2012, Turo partnered with General Motors and their OnStar division, planning to develop technology for users to open their cars remotely without installing additional technology. In 2013, however, Turo discontinued both its in-car device and its OnStar integration in favor of in-person key exchange.

=== Funding ===
Between 2010 and 2014, RelayRides received $52.5 million in funding from Canaan Partners, August Capital, Google Ventures, Shasta Ventures, and Trinity Ventures. In July 2019, InterActiveCorp (IAC) invested $250 million in venture capital funding. The investment made IAC Turo's largest shareholder.

=== Legal status in New York State ===
In May 2013, the New York State Department of Financial Services (DFS) warned that RelayRides had misrepresented the impact on insurance coverage for New Yorkers who rent out their vehicles on the platform. In response, the company suspended operations in New York State pending a further decision from the DFS. In March 2014, the DFS fined RelayRides $200,000, with their investigation having found "false advertising, unlicensed insurance activity, and other violations." Turo was permitted to partially reopen their platform in New York State in January 2021, and returned fully in 2022.

=== Rebranding and expansion ===
In November 2015, RelayRides changed its name to Turo to reflect the company's shift away from short-term car sharing to long-term car rentals. Forbes included it among 14 "hottest on-demand startups" in 2015, with a valuation of $311 million.

In 2016 and 2017, Turo launched in three Canadian provinces: Alberta, Ontario, and Quebec. Also in 2016, Turo launched in the United Kingdom.

Turo expanded into Germany in early 2018 after acquiring Daimler’s Croove platform. However, due to the sudden drop in travel and mobility during the COVID‑19 pandemic, Turo announced on April 9, 2020, that it would cease all private peer-to-peer listings in Germany and cancel future bookings, shifting to a model that allowed only commercial hosts to operate.

In November 2018, Turo introduced a new in-car device allowing GPS monitoring and remote unlocking through the Turo app. In May 2019, Turo announced Turo Go Digital to offer keyless entry into vehicles without in-car devices.

In 2022, Turo acquired a car-sharing service in France called OuiCar for an undisclosed amount. It expanded to the U.S. state of New York in June 2022 after the 2021 passing of a peer-to-peer car-sharing bill in the state, SB 6715. Turo expanded to Australia later that year.

In October 2025, Turo introduced new options that allow guests to book vehicles for extended, multi-month durations, expanding its platform into the long-term rental market.

=== 2025 New Years Day incidents ===
On January 1, 2025, two separate deadly attacks, each involving a vehicle rented through the service, occurred. A vehicle ramming attack in New Orleans using a Ford F-150 Lightning light duty truck, and an explosion of a Tesla Cybertruck pickup truck outside the Trump International Hotel Las Vegas. The company said it found no red flags in the renters' applications.

== Services ==
In contrast to traditional fleet-based car rental agencies, Turo does not own or maintain any cars. The company offers a platform on which car owners and car-renting companies can rent their cars for daily, monthly, or extended-duration rentals. Turo claims that its rental costs are lower compared to traditional rental services. People or companies who wish to rent out their vehicles to Turo users can register their cars online or on the Turo app.

Vehicle owners specify availability, pricing, and delivery options through the platform. Turo provides booking, payment processing, insurance options, and customer support. The company retains a percentage of rental revenue, which varies depending on the insurance coverage selected by the vehicle owner.

== See also ==
- Alternatives to car use
- Car rental
- Car sharing
- Carpooling
