= Peer-to-peer carsharing =

Private car owners sharing or renting their vehicles temporarily to others

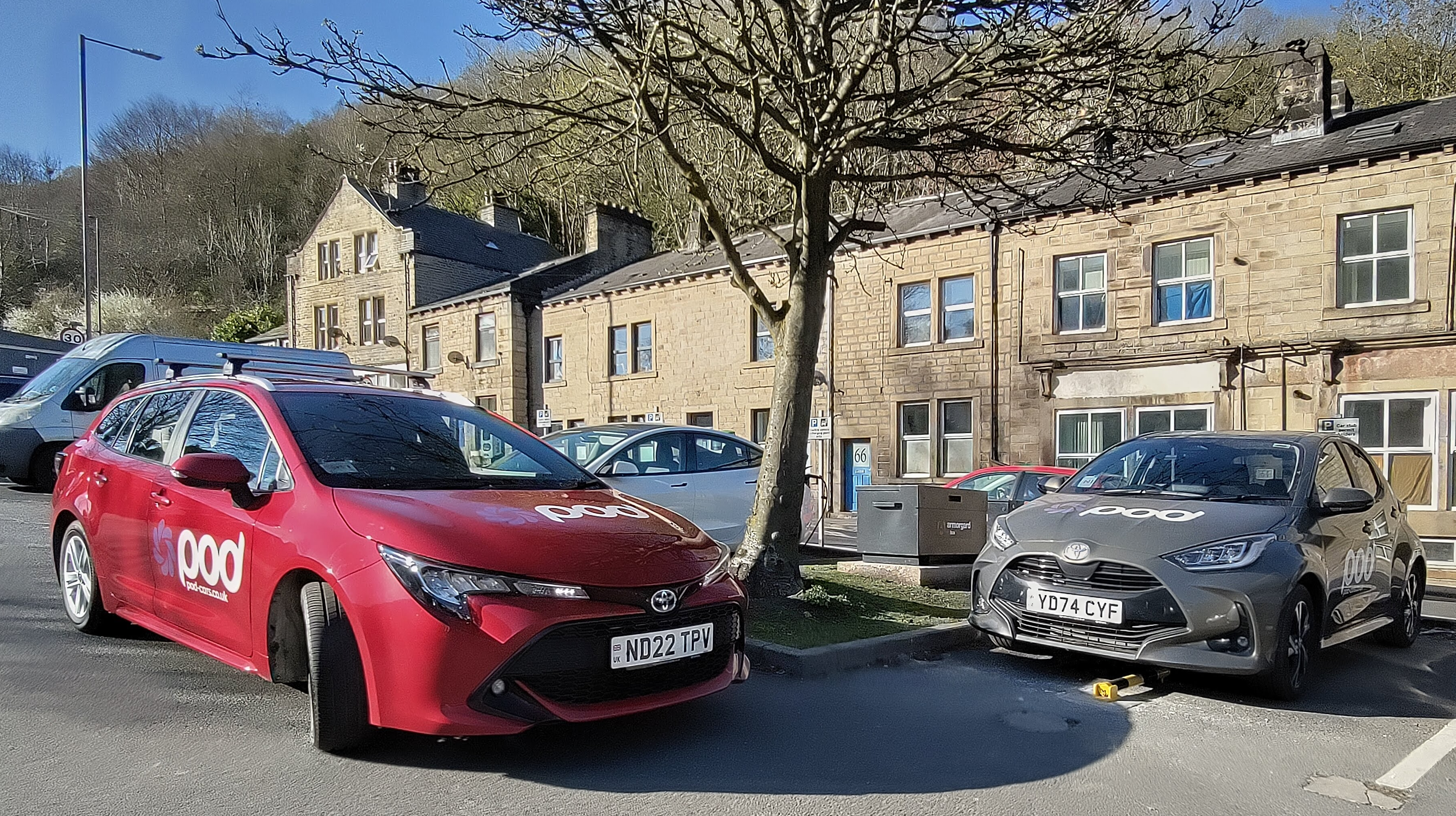
POD cars in Hebden Bridge, UK. POD is a community-owned car club run by local volunteers.

Peer-to-peer carsharing (also known as peer-to-peer car rental or person-to-person carsharing) is the process whereby vehicle owners make their personal cars available for others to rent for short periods. It is a form of collaborative consumption within the sharing economy, distinct from traditional car rental and fleet-based carsharing (such as Zipcar and GoGet) because the vehicle fleet is decentralized and owned by individuals rather than a single company.

== Operation ==
Peer-to-peer carsharing platforms (such as Turo and Getaround) act as intermediaries that screen participants, facilitate bookings, and process payments.

User experience typically involves:

- Owners (Hosts): List their vehicle availability and pricing. Platforms typically retain 25% to 40% of the rental fee to cover insurance, roadside assistance, and operating costs.
- Renters (Guests): Browse nearby vehicles via a mobile app or website, book a car, and unlock it either via a smart device or a physical key exchange.

Trust and safety are managed through two-way review systems (where hosts and guests rate each other) and identity verification checks, though the decentralized nature of the fleet means vehicle condition can vary more than in standardized commercial fleets.

== History and market trends ==
The model emerged in the early 2010s, driven by the adoption of smartphones and location-based services. Early market entrants sought to disrupt the traditional rental industry by offering a wider variety of vehicles and more convenient pickup locations.

While the sector experienced rapid growth initially, it faced stiff competition from ride-hailing services (like Uber and Lyft) for short-term mobility needs. By the 2020s, the market stabilized as a distinct alternative to traditional car rental for longer trips (multi-day) or specific vehicle experiences, rather than just hourly commuting.

As of 2024, the global peer-to-peer carsharing market was valued at approximately $3 billion. The sector is heavily consolidated; market leader Turo reported $958 million in revenue for 2024, operating as the dominant platform in North America after competitor Getaround ceased its U.S. operations in 2025 to focus on Europe.

== Regulation and insurance ==
A primary barrier to peer-to-peer (P2P) carsharing has historically been personal auto insurance, which typically excludes coverage for commercial use ("livery"). As the industry expanded, different regions developed distinct regulatory frameworks to address liability and taxation.

=== United States ===
In the United States, specific legislation was passed in over 40 states to separate personal use from rental periods. California's Assembly Bill 1871 (enacted 2011) was a landmark law prohibiting insurers from canceling personal policies solely because a vehicle was used for carsharing, provided the annual revenue did not exceed the car's expenses. By 2026, most states had adopted similar "Peer-to-Peer Car Sharing Program" acts that mandate platforms to provide state-minimum liability insurance and collect sales tax, effectively distinguishing the activity from traditional rental agencies.

=== International frameworks ===
Outside the U.S., regulations often differentiate between "cost-sharing" (carpooling) and "for-profit" peer-to-peer rental.

- United Kingdom: The Association of British Insurers (ABI) differentiates between ride-sharing (where passengers contribute to fuel costs) and commercial peer-to-peer hiring. For the latter, platforms typically provide a separate commercial insurance policy that supersedes the owner's personal policy during the rental period to protect the owner's no-claims bonus.
- Australia: The Australian Taxation Office (ATO) classifies peer-to-peer car sharing as a business activity. Owners must declare rental income on tax returns but can claim deductions for business-related expenses (such as platform fees, insurance, and depreciation) apportioned by the percentage of business use.
- France: Peer-to-peer rental is widely established, though platforms enforce strict eligibility based on vehicle class.

=== Developing markets ===
In regions such as Latin America and Africa, the sector often operates in a regulatory gray area without specific legislation.

- Latin America: In cities like Mexico City and Bogotá, platforms have grown rapidly despite a lack of specific P2P laws. This has led to regulatory disputes, as P2P vehicles often operate under general civil codes rather than the strict transport regulations applied to taxis or traditional rental fleets.
- Africa: In markets like Rwanda and Kenya, peer-to-peer rental serves as an alternative to limited public transport. However, insurance remains a significant hurdle.

== Impact ==
Proponents argue that peer-to-peer carsharing reduces the environmental impact of manufacturing by utilizing existing idle vehicles, while some critics contend that the convenience of these services may actually draw passengers away from public transit.

Criticism of peer-to-peer carsharing includes its impact on urban planning and fair competition. Residents in high-demand areas have reported the impact of carsharing in residential street parking while the American Car Rental Association has argued that P2P platforms have an unfair competitive advantage by avoiding the taxes and airport fees mandated for traditional rental companies.

== See also ==
- Car rental
- Carsharing
- Sharing economy
- Sustainable transport
