= Communauto =

Canadian carsharing company

- Type: Private
- Industry: Car sharing
- Founded: 1994
- Headquarters: 1117 rue Sainte-Catherine Ouest, Montréal, Québec, Canada
- Area served: Quebec: Montreal, Quebec City, Gatineau, Sherbrooke, Trois-Rivières Ontario: Toronto, Waterloo, Hamilton, London, Guelph, Kingston, Ottawa And: Calgary, Edmonton, Halifax & Paris, France
- Key people: Benoît Robert (Chairman and CEO)
- Services: Car sharing
- Number of employees: Equivalent to 68 full-time
- Website: www.communauto.com

Communauto is a Canadian carsharing company based in Montréal, Québec, Canada, that offers car-sharing services in fifteen Canadian cities and Paris, France. As of March 2018 it had 40,000 users, and as of 2025 a fleet of approximately 7,000 free-floating and station-based vehicles.

Communauto provides automobile reservations to its members, billable by the hour or day; members may have to pay a monthly or annual membership fee in addition to car reservation charges.

Members can reserve vehicles with Communauto's mobile app, online, or by phone at any time, either immediately or up to a month in advance. Communauto members have automated access to the cars using an access card which unlocks the door; or using the mobile application. The keys are already located inside. Communauto may charge a deposit, an annual fee, and a reservation charge, depending on the plan chosen. Fuel, parking, insurance, and maintenance are included in the price.

== History ==
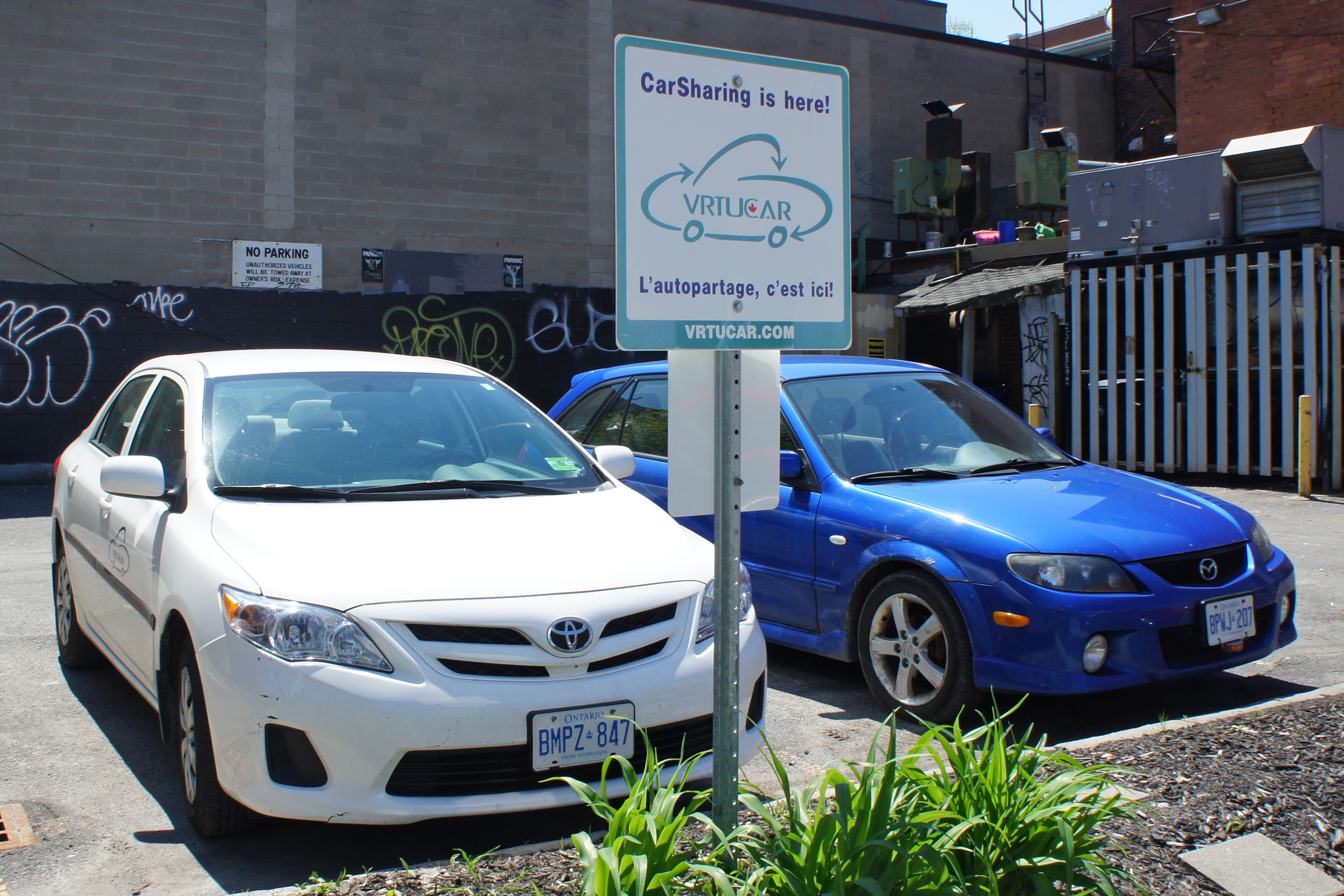
Two VRTUCAR vehicles; VRTUCAR later merged with Communauto

Communauto was founded in Quebec City in 1994 by Benoît Robert, its current CEO. Cycling advocate and environmentalist Claire Morissette played a major role in its evolution starting in 1995, when Communauto established itself in Montreal as a private company. As of 2017, the company had close to 50,000 users and over 2,000 vehicles.

Communauto acquired Paris, France-based Mobizen in 2012, merged with Ottawa-based VRTUCAR in 2016, and acquired CarShare Atlantic in 2018.

Communauto's goal is to provide a convenient and economical alternative to owning a car.

In June 2022, Communauto expanded to the city of Trois-Rivières.

== Membership ==
Communauto has various membership plans for its members; they are suited for different kinds of users, from infrequent users to frequent users.

== Services ==
Communauto offers two kinds of vehicles: round-trip vehicles and Flex vehicles. Round-trip vehicles must be returned to their station after use, and are best suited for planned trips. FLEX vehicles, only offered in some cities, can be picked up and dropped off within a designated area. They are best suited for spontaneous or one-way trips.

== Fleet ==
Communauto has various vehicles available in its fleet. However, the majority of vehicles available are compact and sub-compact vehicles.

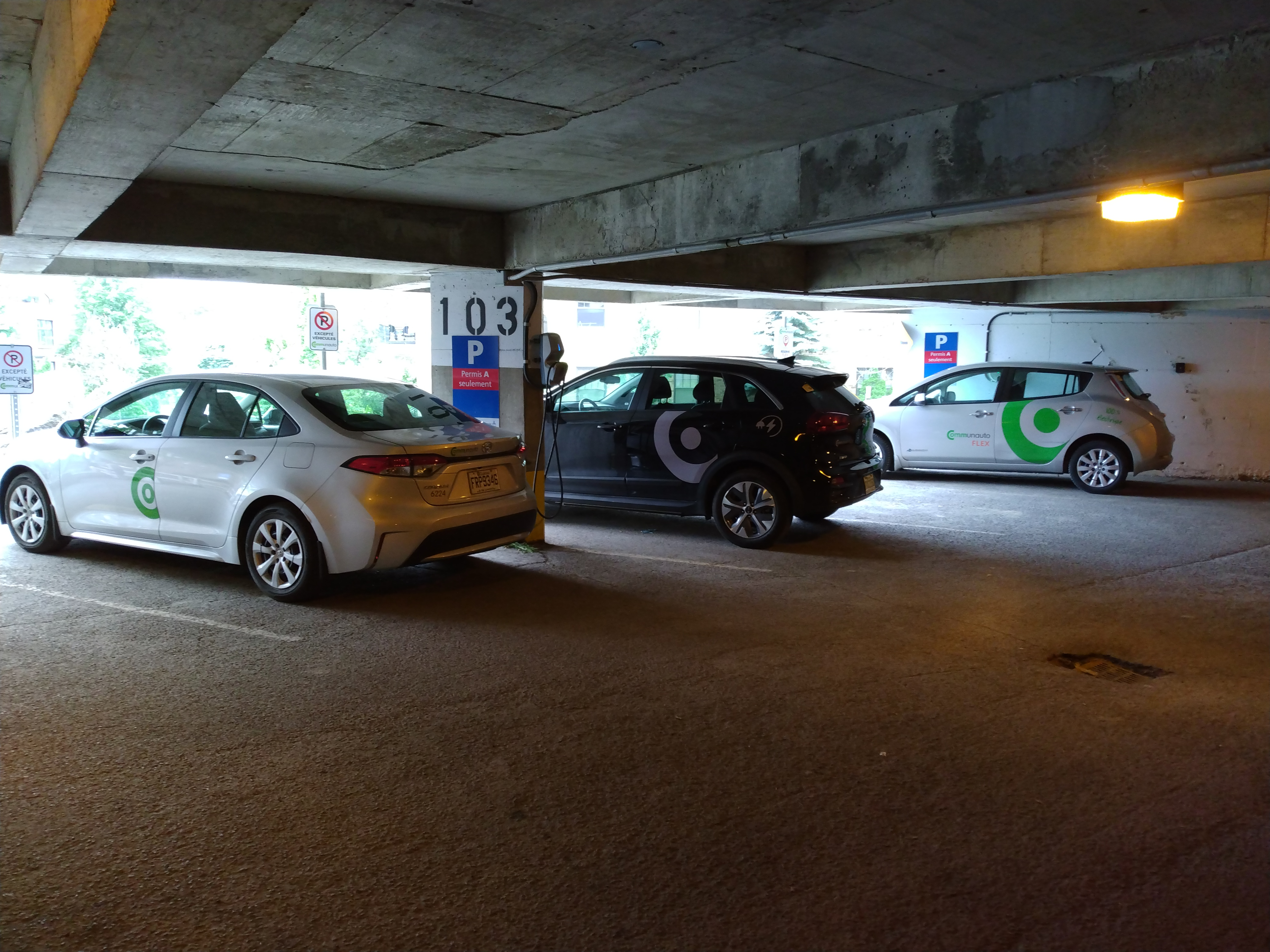
Group of Communauto vehicles parked in the main parking garage of Université de Montréal

=== Common vehicles in the Communauto fleet ===
==== Sedan ====
- Toyota Corolla (sedan)
- Kia Forte (sedan)

==== Hatchback ====
- Toyota Yaris
- Toyota Prius C
- Kia Rio
- Hyundai Accent
- Nissan LEAF
- Kia e-Niro

=== SUV ===
- Kia Sportage
- Hyundai Venue
- Hyundai Kona

=== EV ===
- Kia Niro

== City coverage and partnerships ==
Communauto operates in 12 cities in Quebec - Montreal, Quebec City, Gatineau, Trois-Rivières, Sherbrooke, Victoriaville, Boisbriand, Terrebonne, Laval, Sainte-Thérèse, Rimouski, and MRC des Collines. Outside Quebec, Communauto operates in Calgary, Edmonton, Halifax, Cambridge, Kitchener, Waterloo, Guelph, Hamilton, Kingston, London, Ottawa, the Greater Toronto Area, and Paris, France.

Communauto's users-per-vehicle ratio can rise in winter to 20 users per vehicle and drops to about 15 users per vehicle in summer.

In Paris, France, the company signed a partnership in May 2017 with the local public-transport operator, RATP Group. As of May 2019, 200 cars are available across 100 sites located in Paris and close suburbs.

In 2023, Peg City Car Co-op, a car sharing service operating in Winnipeg, Manitoba, announced a partnership with Communauto to handle the creation of the Peg City Car Co-op app.

The Town of Banff collaborated with Communauto to launch a resident-exclusive, car sharing options for the local.

Communauto planned to expand its fleet in West Island and Nuns Island, following a partnership with REM light-rail line. 26 reservation-based cars will be added to REM stations, including Du Ruisseau, bois-Franc, Sunnybrooke, Pierrefonds, Sainte-Dorothee, Grand-Moulin, Deux-Montagnes, Des Sources, and Anse-a-l'Orme.

== Impact ==
The impact of carsharing in Quebec was evaluated in a study from Communauto and conducted by Tecsult Inc. in 2006. With an estimated 168,000 tons of CO_{2} emissions eliminated per year as a result of carsharing.

== Cyber Attack ==
On January 8, 2021, Communauto notified customers that it has been the victim of a cyber attack. CEO Benoit Robert assured that no potentially sensitive data including account passwords or credit card information were accessed.
