= Carsharing =

Brief car rental method

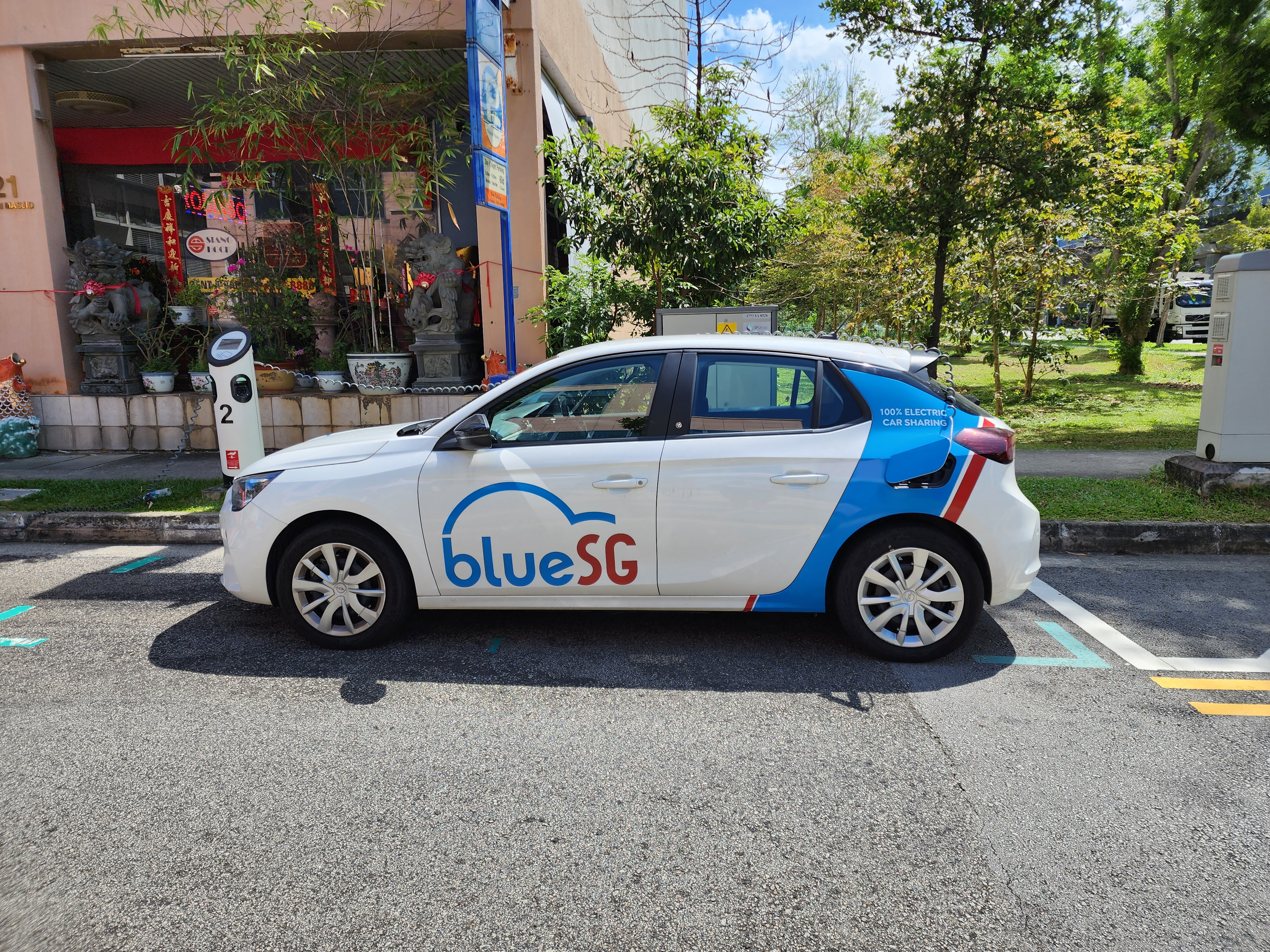
BlueSG electric car parked at a car sharing parking.

Carsharing or car sharing (AU, NZ, CA, TH, & US) or car clubs (UK) refers to several models of car rental or car use, where people rent cars for short periods of time, often by the hour. Unlike traditional car rental, collecting and returning the vehicle is often self-service through a mobile app and without entering an office or agency. It also often differs in the length of hire and the cost structure. In some models a commercial company owns the fleet and offers it for member use (business-to-consumer). In other models the owners are private individuals who organise as a cooperative or ad hoc grouping, or list their vehicles with a separate car sharing facilitator (peer-to-peer). Car sharing is part of a larger trend of shared mobility.

Car sharing began in Europe in the late 1940s, before spreading to North America, and is now an international phenomenon. The 2024 global market size for car sharing was valued at US$ 4.7 billion to 8.9 billion. Car sharing is growing: projections of the 2033 global market size range from US$14.3 to 24.4 billion. Europe was the global car sharing leader in 2024, with the highest adoption and market share at 38%. Emerging markets include Latin America, the Middle East and Africa, driven by demographic trends, economic development, and regulatory change.

Car sharing has been shown to lower car ownership and usage. Car sharing can reduce traffic congestion, lower greenhouse gas emissions and improve air quality.

== History ==
=== 1940s–1970s: European Cooperative Origin ===
Car sharing began with early European cooperative models aimed at community resource sharing rather than commercial profit. The first documented instance was the Selbstfahrergemeinschaft (aka Sefage) cooperative in Zurich, Switzerland, established in 1948. It was largely motivated by economic reasons, enabling individuals who could not afford to purchase cars to share access to one vehicle. The operating model, centered around a small user group, was an early form of the Station-Based/Round-Trip service, where a vehicle was reserved and returned to its original location. The 1970s saw more ambitious, though ultimately short-lived, experiments, including the coin-operated Procotip system in Montpelier, France (1971-1973) and the notable electric-vehicle-based Witkar in Amsterdam (1974-1988). These early programs struggled due to small scale and planning issues, demonstrating that convenience and high vehicle utilization were key to the model's eventual success. Many other shared car experiments were attempted but were unable to grow large enough to sustain, among them: Green Cars (UK, 1977-1984), Bilpoolen (Lund, Sweden, 1976-1979), and Bilkooperativ (Gothenburg, 1985-1990).

=== 1980s–1990s: Growth and North American introduction ===
Car sharing saw a resurgence around the 1980s and 1990s with organised, membership-based car sharing programs, particularly in the US and Europe. These were mostly smaller non-profit, cooperative organizations, like StattAuto in Germany, which established viable operational models. similar to initiatives in the Netherlands and in Sweden. In the U.S., early programs like Mobility Enterprise (1983-1986) and the Short-Term Auto Rental (STAR) program in San Francisco (1983-1985) were similarly short-lived. North America had a restart of in their carsharing movement in the 1990s, when Communauto was founded in Quebec City, Canada in 1994, followed shortly thereafter by the first official U.S. operator, CarSharing Portland, in Oregon in 1998, which started with one vehicle and a few neighbors.

=== Early 2000s: Commercialisation and technological disruption ===
The growth of car sharing began in the early 2000s, driven by technological advances in communication and reservation systems, as well as rising urbanisation and environmental concerns. The 2000s also marked the commercialisation of car sharing with the launch of major, venture-backed companies.

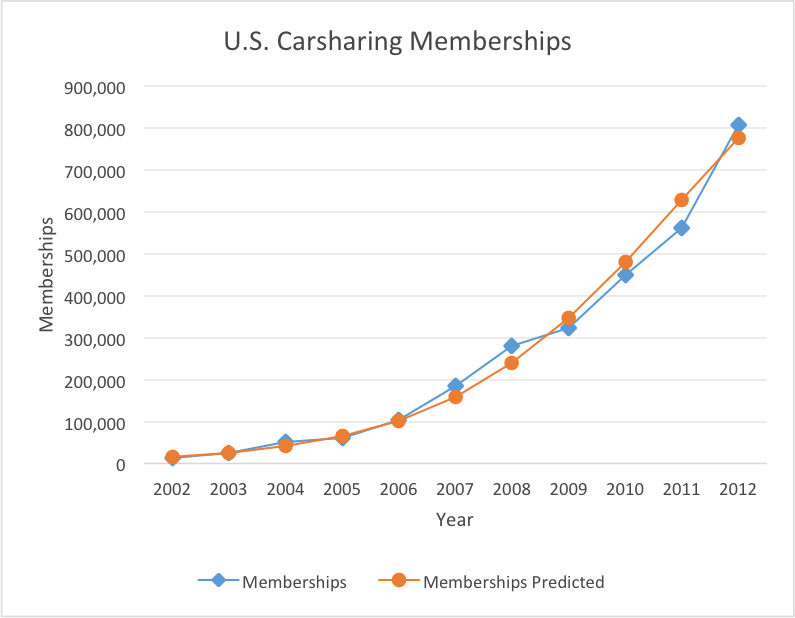
Carsharing growth in the United States.

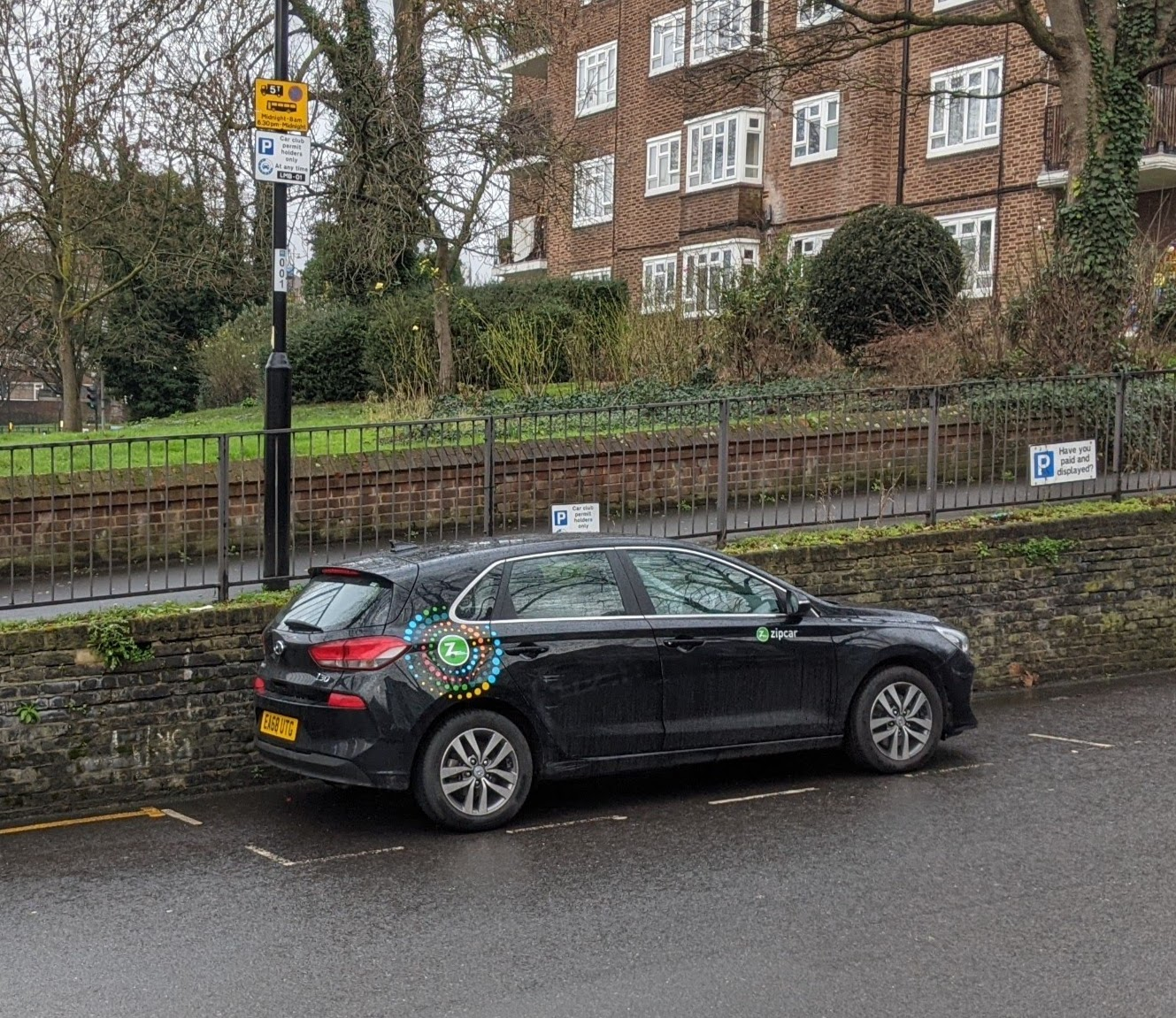
Zipcar vehicle in London.

Founded in Cambridge, Massachusetts, in January 2000, Zipcar quickly established the commercial Station-Based model in the United States. The subsequent decade brought profound technological disruption via smartphones and GPS. This led to the introduction of the highly flexible Free-Floating (One-Way) model around 2008/2009 (pioneered by services like Car2go), allowing users to pick up and drop off vehicles anywhere within a defined service zone. At the same time, the Peer-to-Peer (P2P) model emerged, pioneered by platforms like Turo and Getaround, which expanded the accessible fleet by allowing private car owners to rent out their personal vehicles. Several car rental companies launched their own car sharing services beginning in 2008, including Avis on Location by Avis, Hertz on Demand (formerly known as Connect by Hertz), operating in the U.S. and Europe; Uhaul Car Share owned by U-Haul, and WeCar by Enterprise Rent-A-Car. In 2010 Zipcar accounted for 80% of the U.S. car sharing market and half of all car-sharers worldwide.

In the mid-2010s, car-sharing was becoming an international transportation trend, especially in metropolitan areas. Car sharing also spread to other nations, including Brazil, Mexico, Turkey (Algita, Mobilizm, and YoYo), China, and India. Zarcar, founded in Rio de Janeiro in 2009, was the first car-sharing system in South America. According to Moscow's authority, the number of carsharing journeys in the city averaged 30,000 a day between January and September 2018.

The main factors driving the growth of carsharing were the rising levels of congestion faced by city dwellers, shifting generational mindsets about car ownership, the increasing costs of personal vehicle ownership and a convergence of business models.

=== 2020s and future: Global scale and electric integration ===
Today car sharing operates on a large global scale, driven by rising traffic congestion, digital technologies, and a shift away from individual car ownership. All commercial models of car sharing - Station-Based, Free-Floating, P2P - coexist and are rapidly integrating technology like AI for fleet management. A major industry trend is the increasing adoption of Electric Vehicles (EVs), supported by governments and consumer demand for sustainable transportation.

==== Market size ====
Estimations of the 2024 global market size for car sharing differ, from US$ 4.7 billion to 8.9 billion. Projections of the 2033 global market size range from US$ 14.3 to 24.4 billion. Europe was the global car sharing leader in 2024, with the highest adoption and market share at 38%. In Europe the car sharing market is expected to reach €4-5 billion by 2030.

One report predicts global car sharing membership to grow to 138.3 million by the end of 2029 and a total car sharing fleet of about 755,000 cars. The corporate carsharing market is forecasted to reach about 270,000 vehicles in 2029.

The Asia-Pacific region is projected to experience the highest growth, at 15.8% from 2025 to 2033, due to rapid urbanisation, an expanding middle-class, and increasing smartphone penetration. China, Japan and South Korea lead growth in this region. Emerging car sharing markets include Latin America (Brazil, Mexico and Uruguay), the Middle East and Africa, driven by demographic trends, economic development, and regulatory change.

== Types of car sharing ==
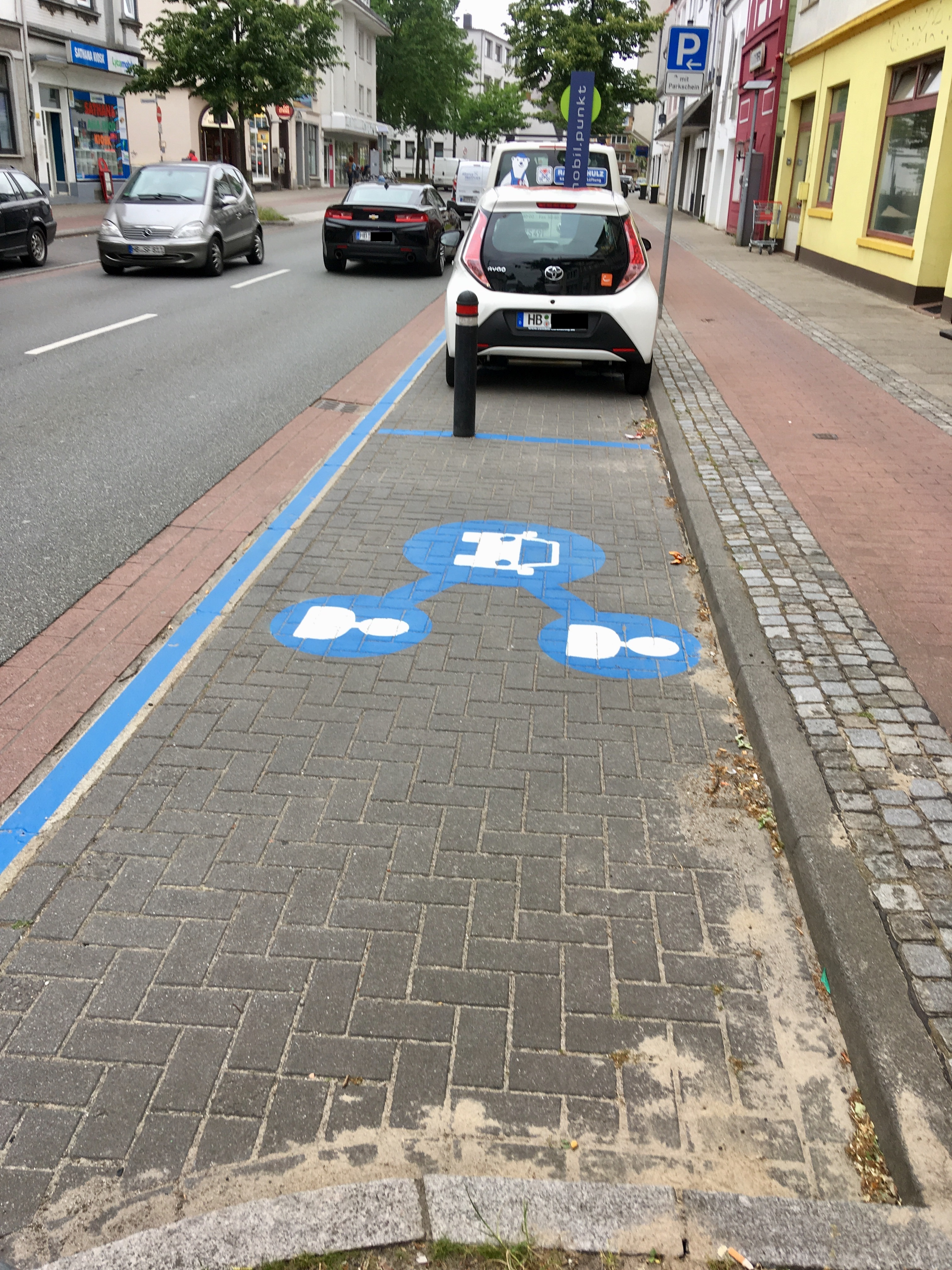
Car sharing parking street markings in Bremen, Germany.

Car sharing programs can either be commercial business-to-consumer (B2C) or peer-to-peer (P2P). Within commercial car sharing schemes (also known as car clubs), the most prominent models are Station-Based (round-trip) and Free-Floating (one way, A-to-B).

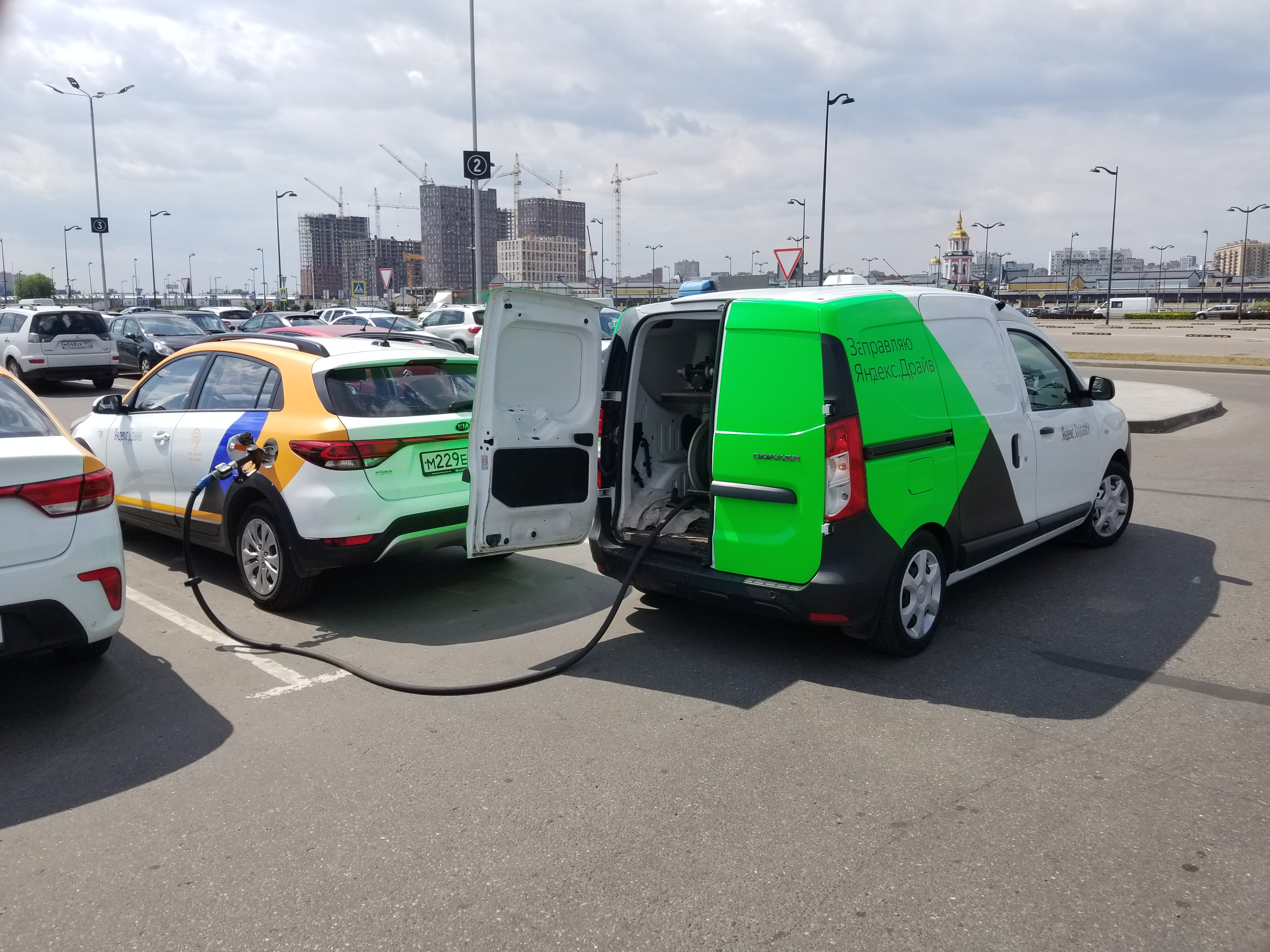
Yandex.Drive, the largest car sharing operator in Russia, uses mobile fuel trucks to refuel its vehicle fleet.

=== Business-to-consumer ===
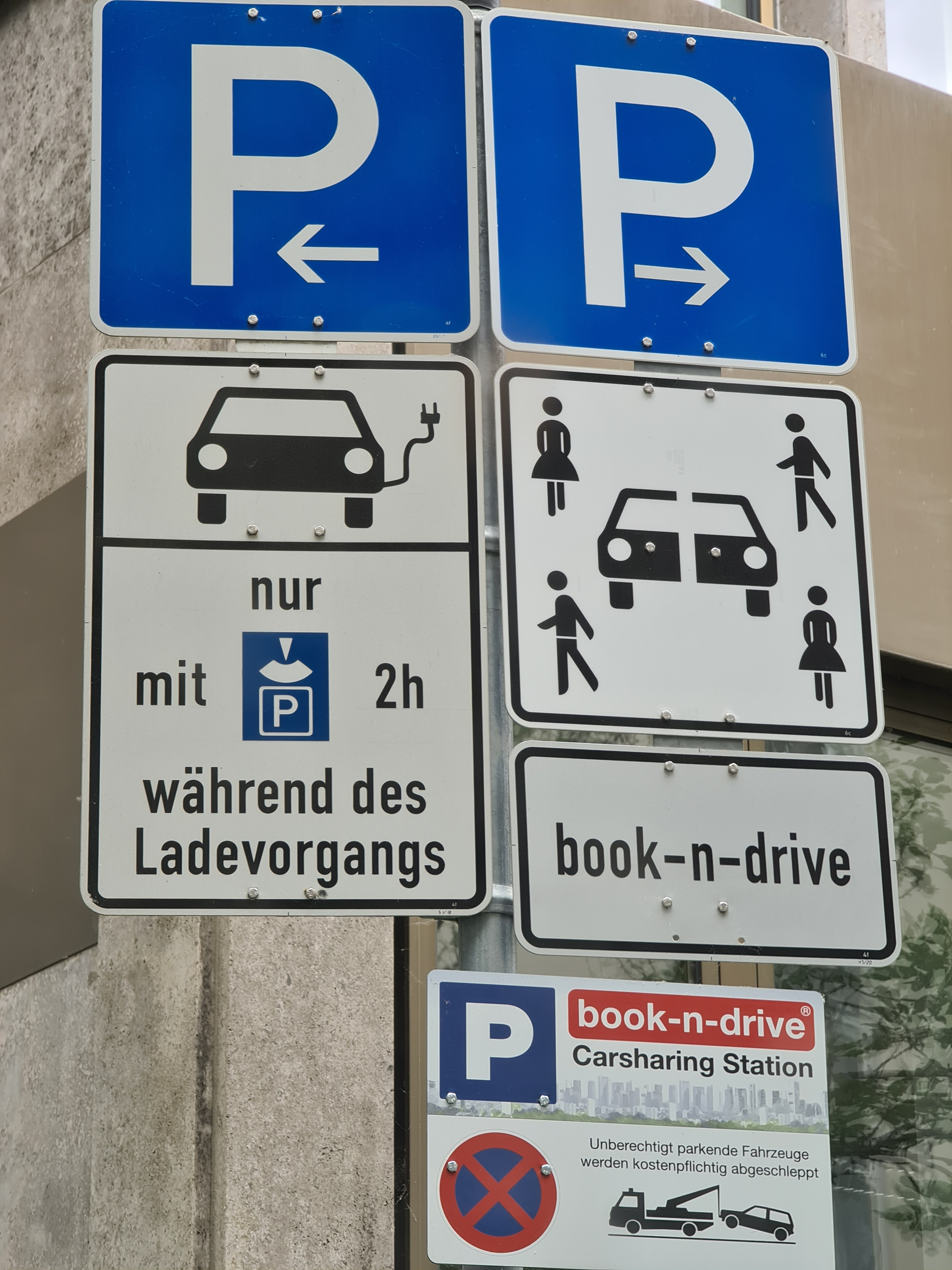
Traffic signs for car sharing and charging parking for e-cars in Germany.

In the B2C model, a carsharing provider owns and maintains a fleet of vehicles accessible to members for short-term use. B2C car sharing can be station-based or one-way/free-floating.

Unlike traditional car hire, B2C car sharing is a fully automated, 24/7 self-service model. Having passed a one-time membership approval process, including background driving checks and payment verification, users can locate and unlock vehicles instantly via a mobile app. Rentals are by the minute or hour, and rates typically include the cost of fuel and insurance. While traditional rentals typically focus on centralised hubs like airports, B2C carsharing vehicles are distributed throughout urban service areas, often placed near public transport to facilitate "last-mile" connectivity. Unlike traditional rentals, vehicles are often maintained and cleaned on a schedule but not between every individual use. Fleet operators utilize decentralized refueling methods, such as mobile fuel trucks used by Yandex.Drive, or rely on members to refuel when levels are low, with costs borne by the provider. Additionally, although carsharing services meet the legal minimum insurance requirements, their insurance policies vary significantly, and the model has been criticised for providing lower liability coverage compared to the more comprehensive protections typically provided by established traditional car rental companies.

==== Round trip/Station-based car sharing ====
With station-based (or round-trip) car sharing, the cars are permanently stationed at designated stations, typically reserved parking spaces. Members pick up the vehicle at the station, and must return it there. The car must usually be reserved for a specific amount of time in advance, and must be returned before that time ends. Payment is usually both by the hour, and by the distance driven. In exchange, a vehicle can be reserved days or weeks in advance, and it is often possible to reserve a specific type of vehicle, such as one with more seats or greater cargo capacity.

==== One-way/free-floating car sharing ====
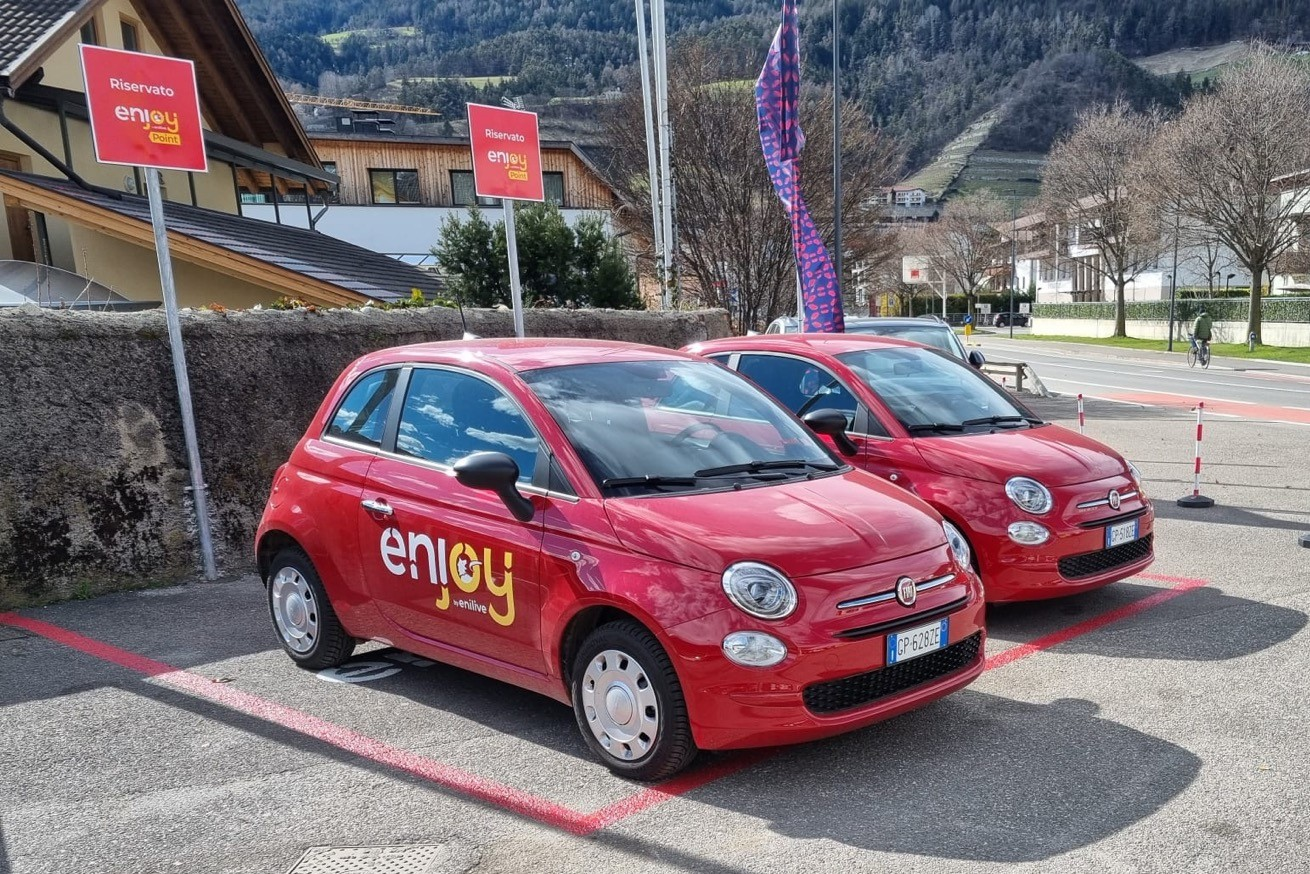
Enjoy car sharing vehicles parked at an Enjoy Point station in Italy.

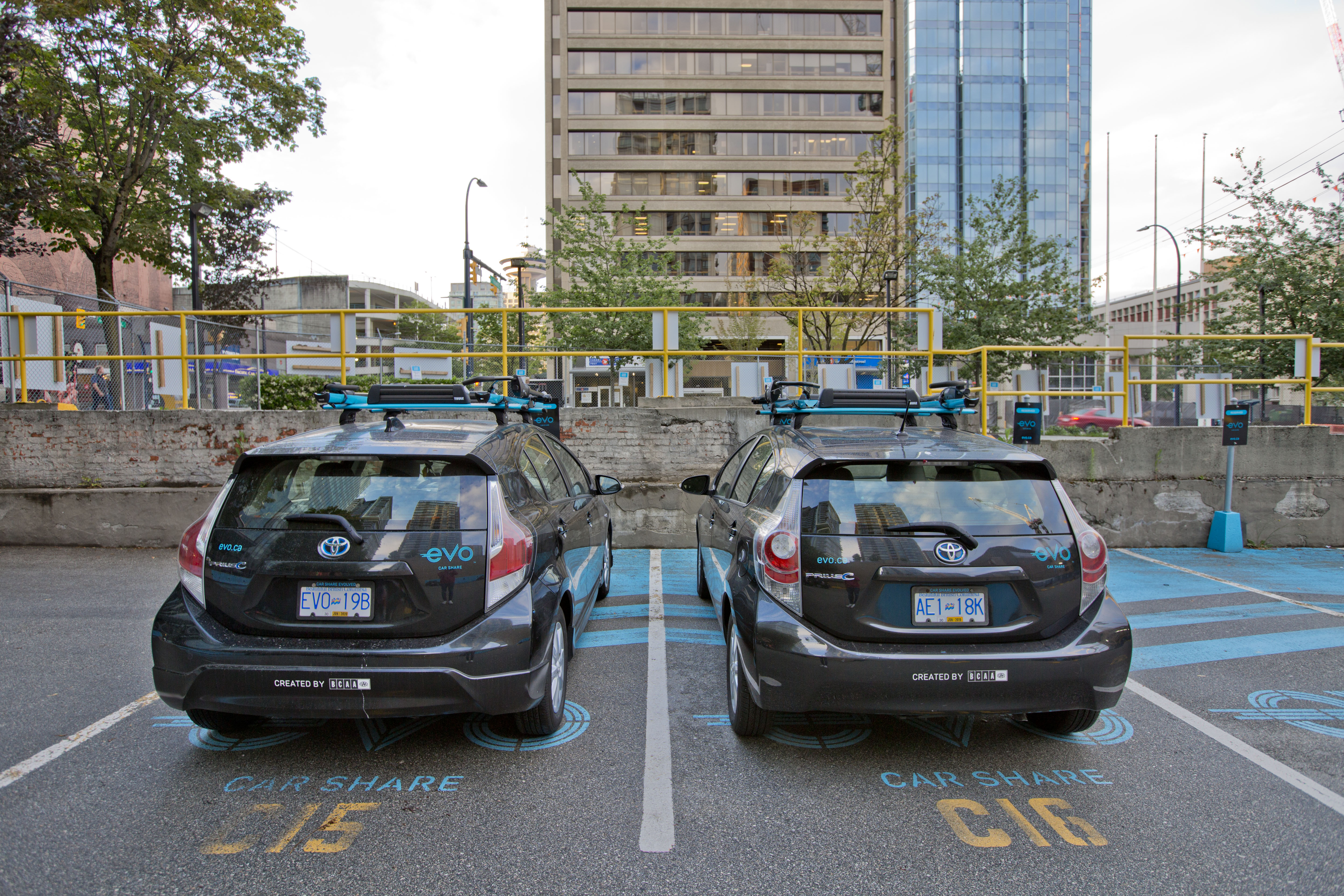
Evo car sharing in Canada.

One-way car sharing enables users to begin and end their trip at different locations. The pick-up and drop-off locations can be either free floating zones or restricted to station-based models with designated parking locations.

As of 2017, free-floating car sharing was available in 55 cities and 20 countries worldwide, with 40,000 vehicles and serving 5.6 million users, with Europe and North America representing the majority of the market. In Europe in 2019, free floating services took up more than 65% of car sharing membership. By the end of 2022, the service was expected to reach 14.3 million users with more than 100,000 vehicles worldwide. However, growth patterns vary among cities, and some have reached a saturation point where no increased fleet size or additional service needed.

Corporate car sharing

Companies may also use fleet cars when employees need vehicles occasionally rather than permanently, such as for meetings, site visits, or short business trips. Instead of assigning one car per employee, vehicles are shared among multiple users and booked when needed.

=== Peer-to-peer car sharing ===
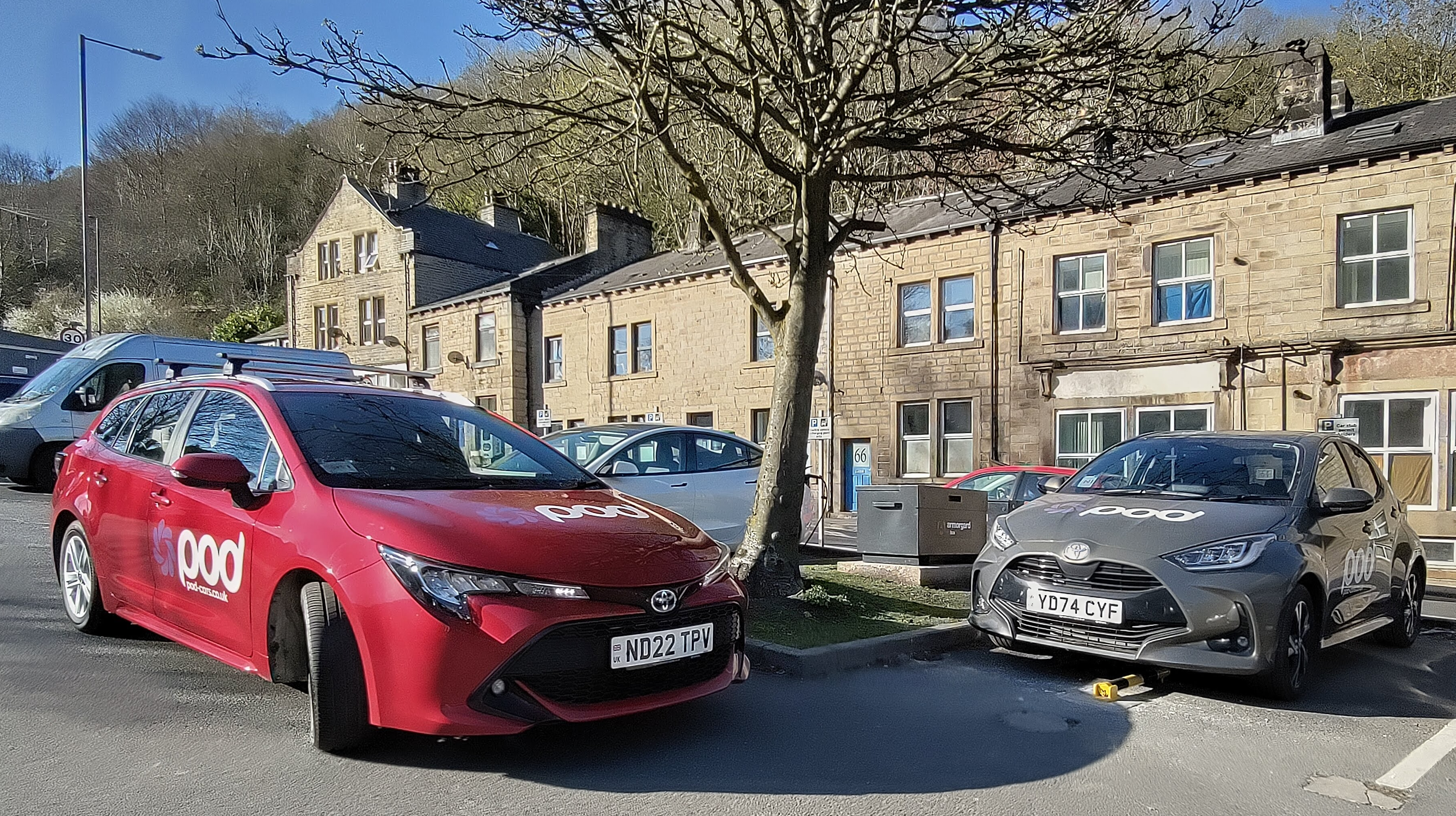
POD cars in Hebden Bridge, UK. POD is a community-owned car club run by local volunteers.

Peer-to-peer car sharing, sometimes referred to as P2P or Personal Vehicle Sharing, is the process whereby existing car owners make their vehicles available for others to rent for short periods of time.

Third-party businesses screen participants (both owners and renters) and offer a technical platform, usually in the form of a website and mobile app, that brings these parties together and manages rental bookings and collects payment. Businesses take a share of the total income, which covers borrower/renter insurance, operating expenses, and roadside assistance. In return, they provide roadside assistance and customer service, and they vet renters with DMV checks.

== Technology ==
The operation of a modern carsharing service is dependent on technology that connects the vehicles to a central software platform and the user. While early systems used manual logbooks and key boxes, current services are almost entirely automated through fleet digitalization. The core components of the technology are:

- The In-Vehicle Device: Every shared vehicle is equipped with a hardware device, often a telematic control unit, that contains a GNSS receiver for automatic vehicle location (AVL) and a cellular modem for communication. This tracking system continuously reports the car's location to a central server, which is how users can find available cars near them on a map.
- The Mobile App: The user interacts with the service almost exclusively through a smartphone app. The app serves as the journey planner, allowing a user to locate and reserve a car. Once a reservation is made, the user's phone is securely authorized to communicate with the vehicle for the duration of the rental.
- Remote Control: The in-vehicle device is connected to the car's internal systems, such as the door locks and ignition. When a user initiates a command from their mobile app (e.g., "unlock"), the request is sent to the carsharing service's central server. The server then relays this secure command to the telematic control unit in the car, which executes the action of locking or unlocking the doors.

The in-vehicle device also collects telemetry data, such as the distance traveled and the duration of the trip, which is automatically sent back to the central server for billing purposes, completing the self-service process.

== Environmental and social impacts ==
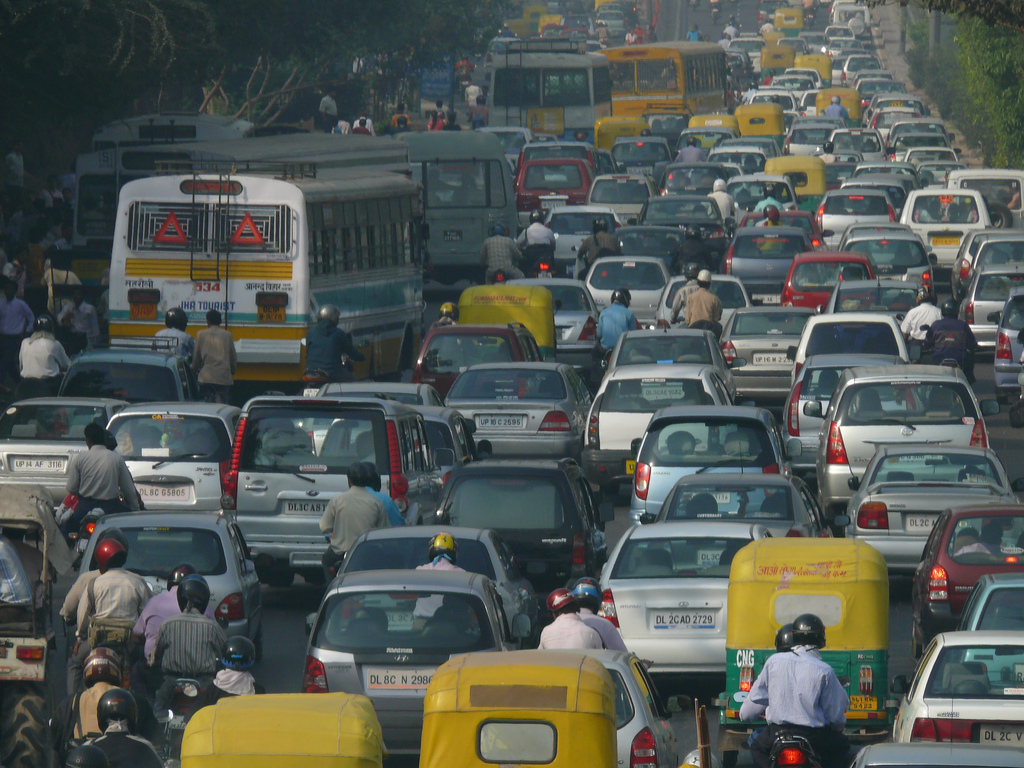
Traffic in Delhi, India. Car sharing can help reduce traffic congestion and improve air quality.

Transport is one of the largest sources of greenhouse gas emissions. To meet climate targets, car use needs to decline significantly, meaning fewer vehicles on the road and less driving overall (UNFCCC, 2021). Car sharing has emerged as an alternative to private car ownership and a way to reduce car dependency.

Most studies suggest that car sharing results in a range of benefits including traffic congestion, air quality improvements and reductions in carbon footprints. The primary mechanisms are that fewer cars are needed to service demand (lowering production emissions) and that, once people give up owning a car, they use other forms of transport more with the carshare vehicle used occasionally. The existence and size of any gains depend on the design of the system (station-based performs better than one way) and the travel behaviour of the participants before and after. If people have already significantly reduced their car miles driven before giving up their car then the gains are smaller. Similarly, some people can access cars who previously would not have done so.

Car clubs specifically have been shown to lower car ownership and usage since their introduction in Europe and North America in the late 1980s. Early studies found that many members sold their cars or delayed buying one after joining. A major review of 25 studies estimated that 20% of members gave up a car and 40% avoided buying a new one, with each shared car replacing about five private vehicles. Later research suggests even greater impact: 9–13 cars per shared vehicle in North America and 14–32 in the UK. Car clubs often replace second household cars and encourage members to drive less and use public transport more. Unlike carpooling or peer-to-peer sharing, car clubs operate fleets that are centrally managed by commercial providers. Due to newer vehicles and reduced driving, car clubs can cut carbon emissions by up to 18%. Members typically report driving 40–60% fewer miles, with over a quarter reducing annual mileage by more than half.

== Economic incentives ==
Car sharing schemes offer economic incentives by reducing vehicle ownership costs and enabling revenue generation from idle assets. In business-to-consumer (B2C) models, users benefit from lower expenses compared to personal car ownership (e.g., upfront purchase, maintenance, insurance, and parking). In the Netherlands, B2C car sharing reduced kilometers driven by 15-20% and mostly replaces ownership of second or third vehicles. Peer-to-peer (P2P) models extend these advantages to vehicle owners, who earn income by renting out underutilised cars, while renters access diverse vehicles options at competitive rates. Behavioural research suggests that perceptions of greater economic benefit can increase consumers' intent to use P2P systems relative to B2C models.

== See also ==
- Sharing economy
- Alternatives to car use
- Car rental
- Carpool
- Ecoleasing
- Fleet vehicle
- List of carsharing organizations
- Ridesharing company
