= H. J. Sterling =

Canadian ice hockey administrator (1882–1959)

- Born: Harry John Sterling; April 26, 1882; Simcoe, Ontario, Canada
- Died: May 23, 1959 (aged 77); Victoria, British Columbia, Canada
- Occupations: Banker, accountant
- Known for: Canadian Amateur Hockey Association president

Harry John Sterling (April 26, 1882 – May 23, 1959) was a Canadian ice hockey administrator. He was elected president of the Canadian Amateur Hockey Association (CAHA) in 1920, after serving as an Ontario Hockey Association executive and as president of the Thunder Bay Amateur Hockey Association. He declared that the CAHA would not tolerate the hockey "tourist" after becoming suspicious of players who changed their addresses to be on a new team. His investigation into registrations led to the suspension of a team from Saskatoon when it was discovered that players who won the gold medal representing Canada in ice hockey at the 1920 Summer Olympics were being paid for amateur hockey. His term as president resulted in the CAHA enacting stricter rules for registration and co-operation with the Amateur Athletic Union of Canada to investigate into all Canadian hockey players to maintain amateurism.

== Early life and move west ==
Harry John Sterling was born in Simcoe, Ontario, on April 26, 1882, to parents Henry John Sterling and Margaret Ryan, who were Anglican Canadians of Scottish and Irish descent. Sterling married Louise May Dell on September 5, 1907, in Port Dover. He had one daughter and one son by 1910, and worked as a bank clerk and an accountant.

Sterling was elected to the Ontario Hockey Association (OHA) executive committee in November 1910, as a representative of hockey in Paris, but resigned one month later due to work commitments. He was the manager of the Bank of Hamilton branch in Paris, and was transferred to the bank office in Winnipeg, Manitoba in December 1910. He assembled a Bank of Hamilton hockey team in November 1912, and managed the team in the Winnipeg Bankers' League. The Winnipeg Free Press wrote that, "they are also very fortunate in having Mr. H. J. Sterling of OHA fame as manager, and his knowledge of the game should be of great assistance to the boys".

== Thunder Bay area career ==
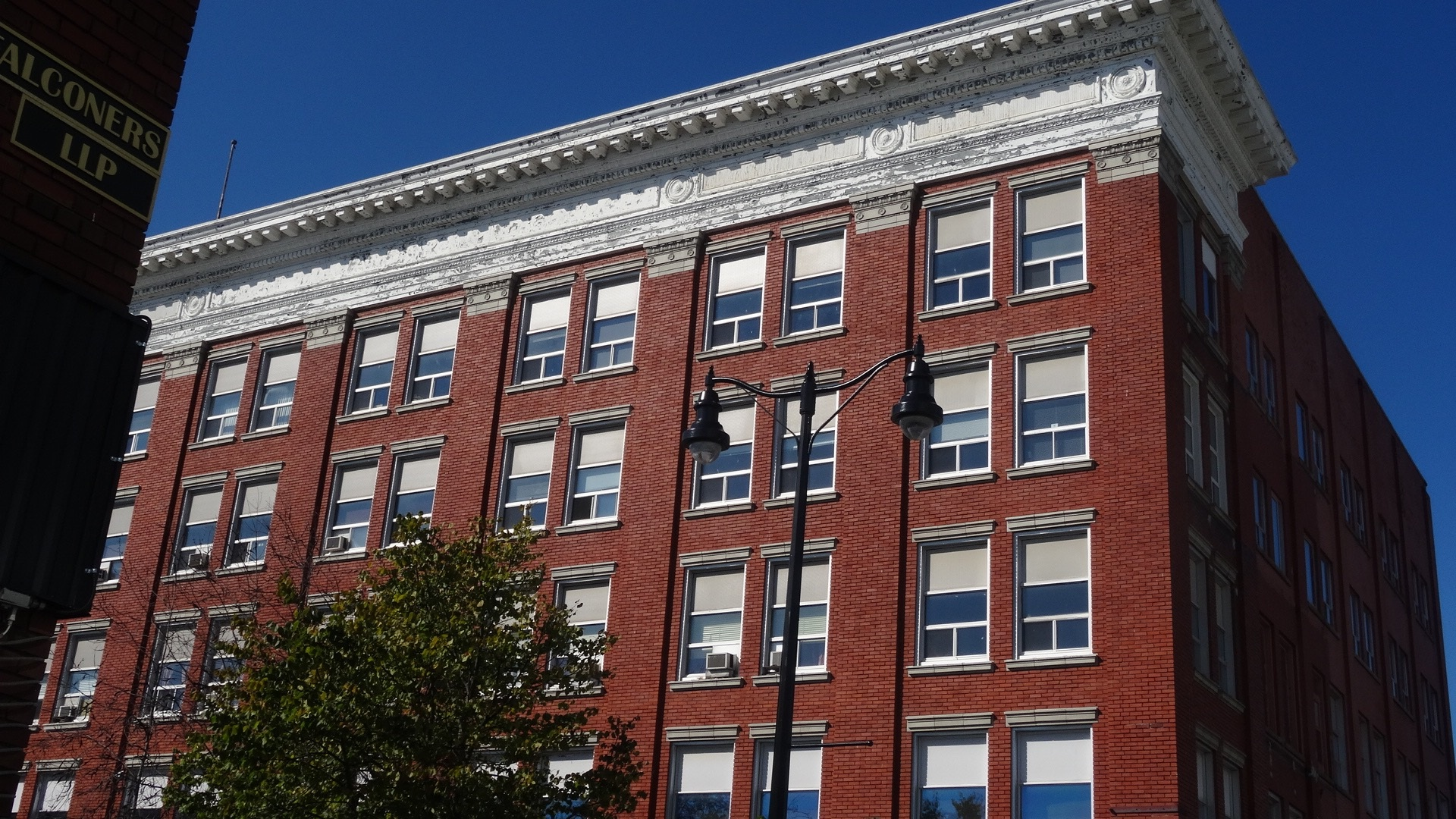
Grain Exchange Building in Fort William

Sterling relocated to Fort William, Ontario, circa 1916. He represented the Fort William Brokerage Company in joint meetings with the Fort William and Port Arthur Grain Exchange, the Fort William city council, and the local board of trade. In response to decisions made by the Board of Grain Commissioners for Canada which forbade the mixing of grades of grain, he sought to expand the local grain trade and educate the public about the grain sample market. He was elected president of the Fort William and Port Arthur Grain Exchange in October 1917, and pledged to assist the Food Controller's Office on a campaign for increased production and the movement for conservation of food during the war. He was elected to the Port Arthur city council in 1918, and later became the secretary-treasurer of the Canadian Feed Manufacturing Company, which was a subsidiary of grain elevator operators Davidson and Smith and Canada's largest livestock feed manufacturer in 1919.

Assuming the presidency of the Thunder Bay Amateur Hockey Association (TBAHA) during the 1918–19 season, Sterling felt that more organization was needed, including standardized rules and player residency requirements. Prior to the 1919 annual meeting, he and secretary W. Harold Taylor revised the TBAHA constitution and by-laws to follow the framework of the Canadian Amateur Hockey Association (CAHA). The TBAHA then decided that Fort William and Port Arthur were considered one city, with respect to establishing player residency. Since ice rink sizes were now required to meet the CAHA standards, the TBAHA declined a team from Schreiber, due to the small dimensions of their home rink. Sterling was re-elected as president despite his intention to resign. He then appointed H. E. James as secretary, a colleague of his at the Grain Exchange.

Sterling oversaw growth for the TBAHA during the 1919–20 season, which operated a senior ice hockey league with three teams, a junior ice hockey league with three teams, and recreational leagues in both Fort William and Port Arthur. The Prince of Wales Rink was constructed in Fort William, opening on December 26, 1919. It replaced the Fort William Rink which burned in 1912, and allowing the TBAHA to operate a junior league after a seven-season hiatus. When organizers of a senior team insisted on using a commercial name contrary to CAHA rules, the team was declined entry into the senior league, and a Fort William Commercial Hockey League was formed with teams sponsored by local businesses including the Grain Exchange. The Port Arthur News-Chronicle wrote that the 1919–20 season was the "most satisfactory" to date, due to following the CAHA constitution and by-laws, with respect to player eligibility. The TBAHA sought to organize senior and junior leagues of at least four teams, to provided better competition, and to include teams from Kenora.

== CAHA president ==
Sterling was elected president of the CAHA to succeed Frederick E. Betts in March 1920. The CAHA sought to establish an annual agreement with Allan Cup trustees where a percentage of profits from the playoffs would be turned over to the CAHA to develop amateur hockey in Canada. Trustee William Northey agreed to negotiate a deal, and to fund travel by the reigning 1920 Allan Cup champions Winnipeg Falcons to ice hockey at the 1920 Summer Olympics. The Falcons won the Olympic gold medal as the first Canadian national hockey team and were given a large banquet upon their return to Winnipeg. Sterling was unable to attend due to business reasons, and the CAHA was represented by its founding president W. F. Taylor.

=== Investigating amateurs ===
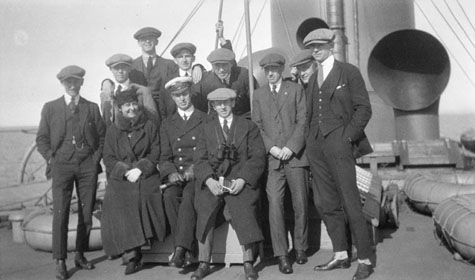
Winnipeg Falcons on route to the 1920 Summer Olympics

At the beginning of the 1920–21 season, Sterling was suspicious of multiple players changing their addresses for the purpose of playing on a new team. He declared that the CAHA would not tolerate the hockey "tourist", a player who moved from one team to another across Canada. Although evidence would be difficult to find, he vowed to do everything in his power to ensure that the CAHA remained amateur and would investigate and suspend any player found to violate the rules. He later hired a detective to investigate the amateur status of players in Canada.

The Amateur Athletic Union of Canada (AAU of C) held its annual meeting in Winnipeg in December 1920, with Sterling representing the CAHA. After the meeting, he held an informal CAHA gathering to discuss elimination of the tourist player. The Winnipeg Tribune expected that the CAHA would introduce legislation which required transfers from one team to another, in an effort to reduce the number of players changing addresses three months prior to the start of the season.

Sterling requested that Manitoba Amateur Hockey Association (MAHA) president H. O. McDiarmid conduct a vote on whether tourist players were welcome within the Manitoba Hockey League. McDiarmid refused to act on behalf of the CAHA since he felt it was not in his authority to do so, which was interpreted by The Canadian Press that tourist players were welcomed in Manitoba. McDiarmid elaborated that each player on the Brandon Wheat City Hockey Club had established residency at least three months prior to the start of the season, and that he did not suspect there any other reason for the change of team. Sterling's detective later reported that all of the players who transferred to the team had found legitimate employment.

The AAU of C voided the amateur registration cards of former Falcons' players Haldor Halderson and Robert Benson halfway through the season. Sterling's detective discovered that neither had worked in Saskatoon and the pair received C$6,500 to play hockey. The detective also reported that former National Hockey League player Rusty Crawford was being paid $500 for the season, and that American Olympian Joseph McCormick declined an offer of $3,000 to play for the team. Sterling ordered the suspension of the Saskatoon team which was protested by the Saskatchewan Amateur Hockey Association (SAHA) as being unconstitutional since a vote of the CAHA executive was required. Sterling later held a mail-in vote and stated his willingness to resign had the CAHA not supported his decision.

=== 1921 Allan Cup ===
The Allan Cup was the championship trophy for amateur senior ice hockey overseen by the CAHA.

The CAHA had an agreement since 1918 which limited the location of the Allan Cup finals or semi-final games to Montreal, Toronto, Winnipeg or Regina. Sterling had returned to Winnipeg for his working career by 1921, and chose the city as the host location for the 1921 Allan Cup finals at an arena with an artificial ice surface. Sterling refused a request by McDiarmid and the MAHA for the suspended Saskatchewan team to be part of the playoffs as long as none of the players in question participated.

The MAHA and the Brandon Wheat City Hockey Club wanted to have the games played at the rink in Brandon, and contested that Sterling was incorrect to make the decision himself without consulting the CAHA executive. They sought an injunction against Sterling to prevent the games from being played in Winnipeg, but were denied when the justice declined to interfere in CAHA business. Sterling presented the trophy to the Allan Cup champions Toronto Varsity Blues men's ice hockey team who defeated the Brandon Wheat City Hockey Club in the finals.

=== Long-term changes ===
In February 1921, the Calgary Regents Ladies Hockey Club wrote to Sterling seeking recognition by the CAHA and approval to enter tournaments. He was sympathetic to the cause and promised to discuss it with other ladies' clubs including Winnipeg and Ottawa. The Ladies Ontario Hockey Association was formed in 1922, but the CAHA voted against allowing female players into the association, which led to the Dominion Women's Amateur Hockey Association being established in 1933.

At the CAHA annual meeting in March 1921, AAU of C president Bruce MacDonald urged for co-operation to clean up amateur sport in Canada, whereas delegates from Manitoba and Saskatchewan motioned to sever ties with the AAU of C. The CAHA voted to remain with the AAU of C, committed to ridding itself of the tourist hockey player, and voted in favour of an investigation into the amateur status of all players.

The CAHA required transfers to be approved by its branches for players moving across the country, with exceptions for junior players relocating with their family. The CAHA extended its residence rule from three months in advance of registration to a deadline of August 1, and decided that players changing residence after January 1 had to supply a valid reason. The CAHA allowed for each branch to recommend arenas to play the Allan Cup finals or semi-finals, instead of only using the same four cities. W. R. Granger was elected president to succeed Sterling, who remained on the CAHA executive as the honorary president.

In June 1921, the AAU of C appointed Sterling as one of four members on an independent commission to investigate the amateur status of all hockey players in Canada. The commission's efforts resulted in the establishment a national registration committee to investigate all registrations, led by W. A. Hewitt as the permanent registrar.

== Later life ==
Sterling's wife Louise died on September 1, 1923, and he was married to Alice Davis by 1926. His second wife had two children from a previous marriage, and was the daughter of Canadian politician Thomas Osborne Davis.

The CAHA began the practice of awarding medals to its past presidents and Sterling received the honour at the general meeting in 1925.

Nesbitt, Thomson and Company named Sterling the manager of an investment banking office established in Saskatoon, and he transferred him from Winnipeg in October 1927. While in Saskatchewan, he recommended that the SAHA focus on increasing its participation by building programs in rural areas of the province.

Sterling had relocated to Vancouver by 1930, and was a delegate from the city to the AAU of C general meetings. In 1931, he began operating the Complete Investment Advisory Service based in Victoria, British Columbia.

In April 1939, eleven of thirteen CAHA past presidents including Sterling, were guests of honour at the association's silver jubilee held at the Royal Alexandra Hotel in Winnipeg. In response to Canada not winning the 1954 Ice Hockey World Championships, Sterling felt that the choice of the East York Lyndhursts to represent Canada had reflected poorly on the CAHA; and that if Canada could not send its best team due to financial struggles, then no team should be sent to the World Championships.

Sterling died from an intracerebral hemorrhage at St. Joseph's Hospital in Victoria, on May 23, 1959. His remains were cremated at the Royal Oak Burial Park.
