= One-way carsharing =

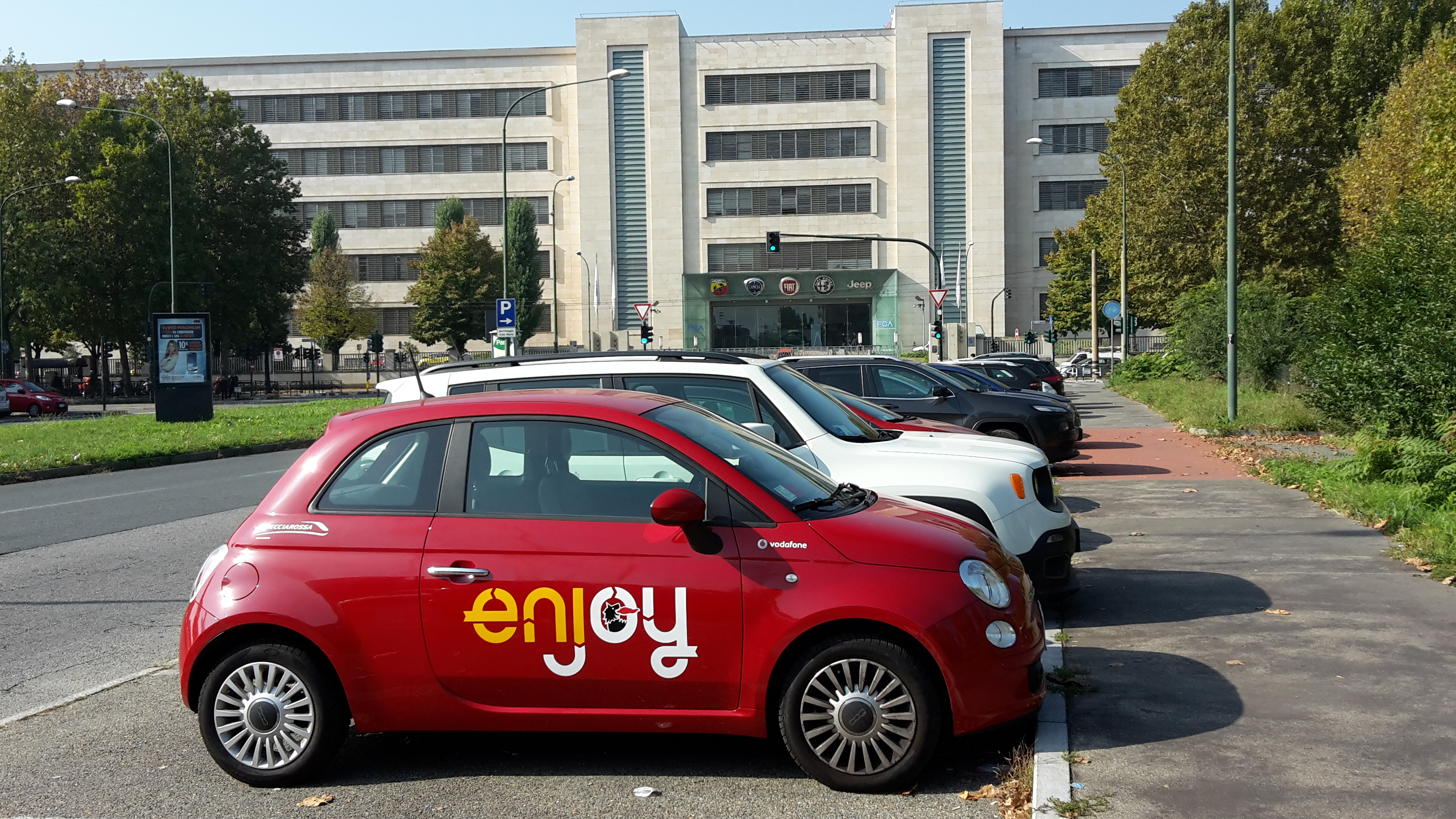
A Fiat 500 available with the Enjoy carsharing service in Turin, Italy

One-way carsharing is a type of carsharing that enables users to begin and end their trip at different locations. The pick-up and drop-off locations can be either restricted to traditional rental stations, or can be anywhere within an operational area in what is called free-floating carsharing.

One-way carsharing is generally more expensive to run than traditional round-trip carsharing, due to the need for rebalancing the fleet after rentals. Free-floating carsharing is often used for short periods at a time, and rental fees are generally charged by the minute.

Most of one-way carsharing is today based on the free-floating model. As of 2017, free-floating carsharing is available in 55 cities and 20 countries worldwide, with 40,000 vehicles and serving 5.6 million users, with Europe and North America representing the majority of the market. In Europe in 2019, free floating services represented over 65% of total carsharing membership. By the end of 2022 the service was expected to reach 14.3 million users with more than 100,000 vehicles worldwide.

The world's largest provider of free-floating one-way carsharing is ShareNow, from the merger of DriveNow and Car2go, owned by BMW and Daimler respectively. Other national operators include Enjoy in Italy, GreenMobility in Denmark, Sweden, Finland, Belgium and Germany, CityBee in the Baltic states, GIG Car Share in California, and Evo Car Share in Canada. Additional markets that also have free-floating carsharing services include Russia, China, New Zealand and Brazil.

Free-floating carsharing service has high chance of becoming a more integral part of city transportation networks in the future. The increase in existing members' activity and new members' registration were proved through the increased use in proportion with the service’s duration. However, the growth patterns vary among cities and some have reached a saturation point where no increased fleet size or additional service needed.
