= Yves Bonnefont =

French industrialist

- Born: 18 December 1970 (age 55); Boulogne-Billancourt, France
- Education: École Centrale Paris
- Occupations: Chief Software Officer, Stellantis
- Children: 5

Yves Bonnefont is a French industrialist and business leader. He was born on 18 December 1970 in Boulogne-Billancourt. He was Chief Executive Officer of DS Automobiles, the new premium brand of Groupe PSA between 2015 and January 2020. In January 2021, he was appointed Chief Software Officer of Stellantis and a member of its Top Executive Team.

== Career ==
Yves Bonnefont graduated from the engineering school École Centrale Paris in 1993.

He began his career at Groupe PSA in 1994 as a project manager at the PSA plant in Rennes before joining the PSA technical centre in Vélizy. In November 1997, he left Groupe PSA to manage the French automotive division of Arthur Andersen for three years. He then joined McKinsey & Company, where he became associate director in 2006 and managed international research in the automotive sector from 2007. In 2010, he was appointed a member of the global committee that elects new associates. In 2012, at the height of the crisis in the automotive market, he decided to once again join Groupe PSA, becoming strategy director and notably overseeing decision-making in changes in positioning of the brands Citroën and Peugeot. In April 2013, he was appointed deputy managing director of Citroën, assisting Frédéric Banzet. In 2014, he became the first chief executive officer of DS Automobiles when it was separated from Citroën, at the instigation of Carlos Tavares.

He was in charge of the new Groupe PSA's connected vehicles business unit, for which he was responsible until the mobility brand Free2Move was launched.

He was the first CEO of a premium brand to have invested in Formula E, with the conquest of the 2018/2019 Drivers and Teams titles of Jean-Eric Vergne and DS TECHEETAH.

In January 2020, he was replaced at the head of DS Automobiles by Béatrice Foucher, former deputy director of the brand.

He also pursues work in investment: until April 2018, he was Chairman of the Supervisory Board of Trescal. Since then, he has continued to invest in start-ups, such as Iziwork, and serve on their boards.

== Personal life ==
Yves Bonnefont is the father of five sons.
