= Evo Car Share =

Carsharing service in Greater Vancouver, Canada

Evo

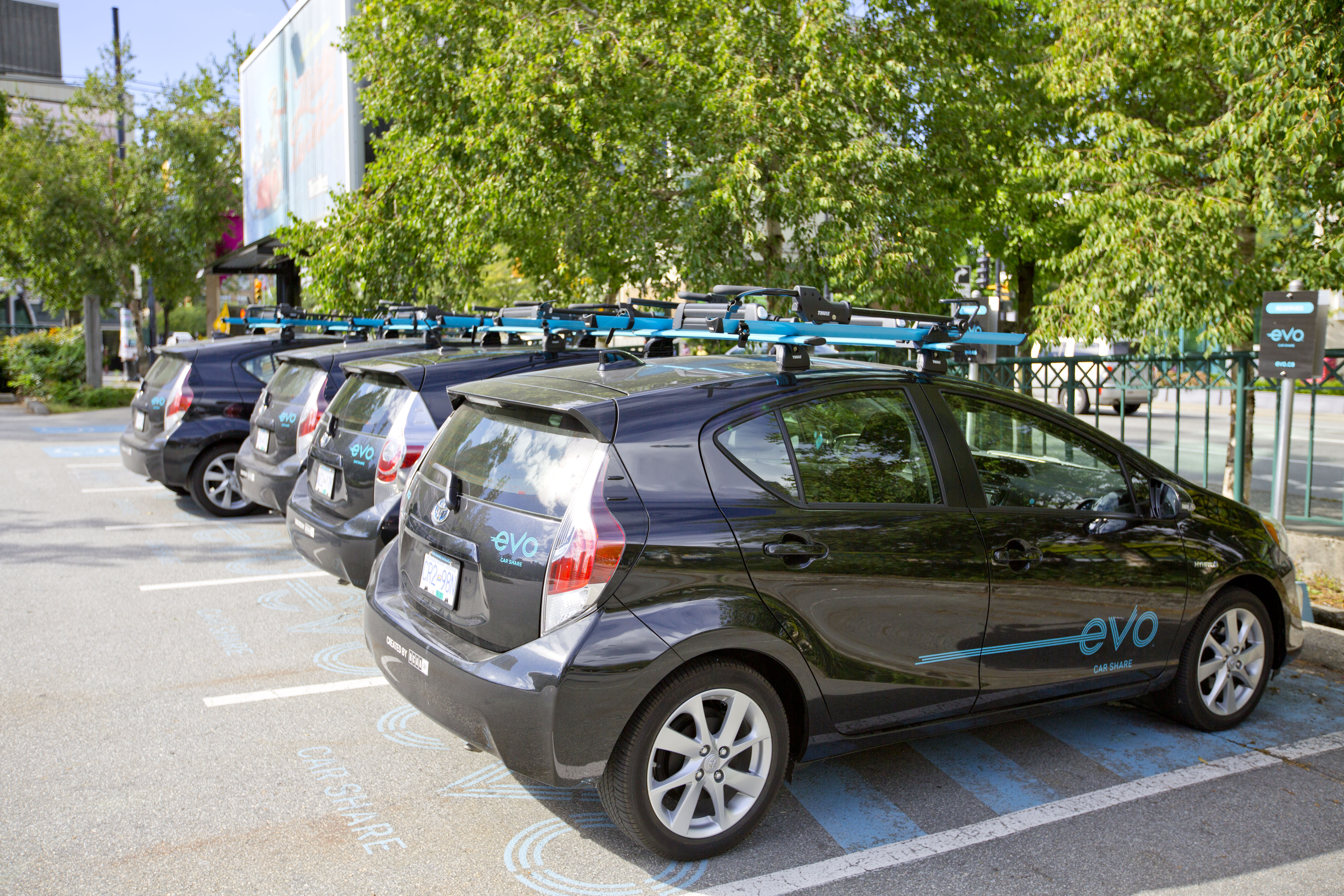
- Type: Subsidiary
- Founded: March 24, 2015; 11 years ago
- Area served: Metro Vancouver, Greater Victoria, Nanaimo
- Services: Carsharing, Bikesharing
- Owner: British Columbia Automobile Association
- Parent: BCAA
- Divisions: Evo Car Share; Evo Return; Evolve
- Website: evo.ca

Evo is a point-to-point car-sharing service operating primarily in Metro Vancouver and Greater Victoria, British Columbia. Founded on March 24, 2015, the service is created, owned, and operated by the British Columbia Automobile Association (BCAA).

Evo was designed to cater to the Pacific Northwest lifestyle, featuring a uniform fleet of hybrid and electric vehicles equipped with roof racks for bicycles and skis. It has grown into one of the largest car-sharing networks in North America. Users are charged by the minute, with hourly and daily rates available.

== History ==
Evo Car Share was launched by BCAA in Vancouver in March 2015 with an initial fleet of 250 hybrid vehicles. The service was introduced to fill a market demand for flexible, one-way utility transport capable of carrying outdoor recreation gear.

The service steadily expanded its "Home Zone" geographic boundaries across Metro Vancouver, entering Burnaby in late 2016 and subsequently adding North Vancouver and New Westminster. In August 2021, BCAA expanded the service outside of Metro Vancouver by launching a separate Home Zone network in Victoria.

By its tenth anniversary in March 2025, Evo reported a member base of nearly 250,000 users who had collectively driven over 278 million kilometres.

== Fleet ==
Unlike traditional car-sharing services that offer varying classes of vehicles, Evo operates a highly standardized fleet to simplify maintenance and user experience.

- Vehicles: The core fleet consists primarily of five-door Toyota Prius hybrids. BCAA has diversified the fleet to include other low-emission vehicles, such as the Kia Niro electric vehicle (EV) and Toyota plug-in hybrids.
- Volume: As of 2026, the active fleet comprises more than 2,500 vehicles across its British Columbia operational zones.
- Equipment: A defining feature of every Evo car is the inclusion of factory-installed Thule roof racks, configured to carry two bicycles or up to four sets of skis/snowboards.

== Operations ==
=== Home zone system ===
Evo operates primarily on a free-floating, point-to-point model. Users locate and unlock vehicles using a smartphone application. A trip can be started at any available legal parking spot within a designated "Home Zone" and terminated in any other approved parking space within the same zone.

The Metro Vancouver Home Zone encompasses the majority of the City of Vancouver, along with designated satellite zones at the University of British Columbia (UBC), Simon Fraser University (SFU), and Vancouver International Airport (YVR).

=== Evo Return (round-trip service) ===
In addition to its free-floating fleet, the company operates Evo Return, a dedicated round-trip service. Designed for longer-term rentals and communities outside the primary Home Zones, this service requires users to return the vehicle to its original pick-up location to end the trip.

Unlike standard vehicles which can only be reserved 30 minutes prior to use, Evo Return vehicles can be booked up to 30 days in advance for durations ranging from one hour up to 30 consecutive days. Evo Return vehicles operate out of designated parking stalls in specific transit and regional hubs, notably in Surrey (including Surrey Central and King George stations), Nanaimo, and Tofino.

=== Pricing and Inclusions ===
Users are billed via a metered tier structure by the minute, hour, or full day, depending on whichever rate is most economical for the trip duration. The base cost covers, fuel/charging, comprehensive auto insurance, and dedicated municipal permit parking fees. BCAA members receive distinct fee waivers and a percentage discount on regular driving rates.

=== Evolve (Micro-mobility expansion) ===
Under the broader Evo umbrella, BCAA introduced Evolve E-Bike Share and e-scooters in 2022. Operating as a hybrid system alongside the vehicle fleet, these active-transit options are stationed across various BC municipalities, including Metro Vancouver, Whistler, Squamish, and portions of Vancouver Island.

== See also ==
- Car2Go
- Modo
- Zipcar
- GIG Car Share
