= ReachNow =

Carsharing service

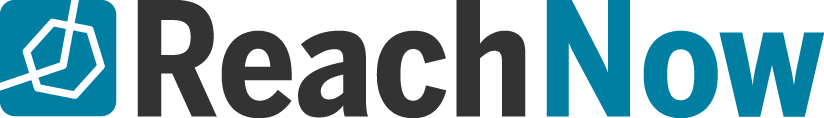

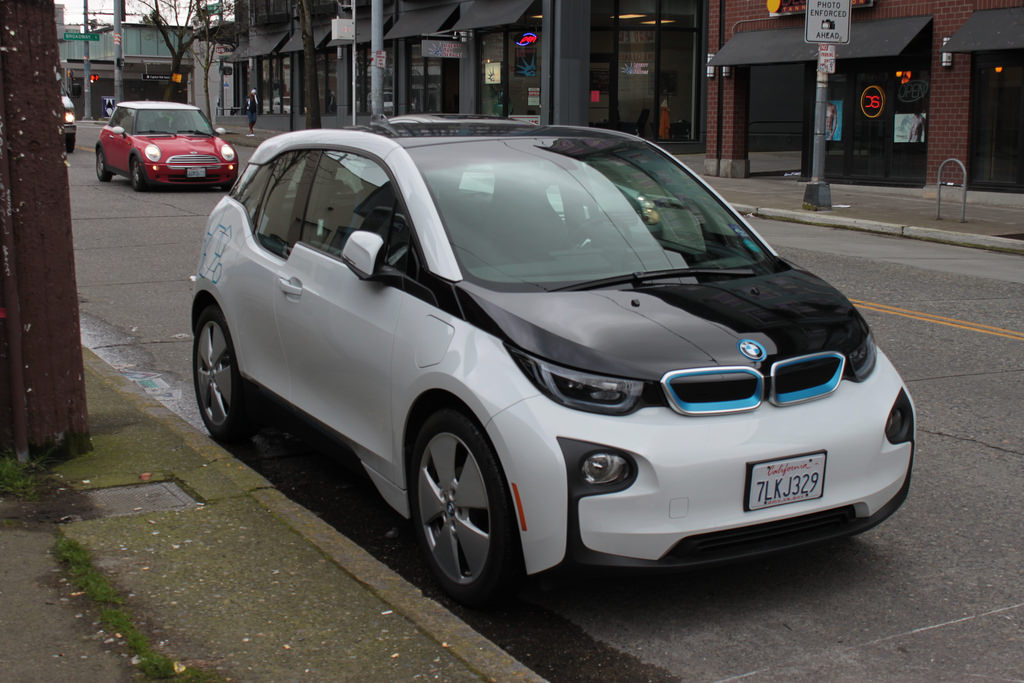
- A BMW i3 in Seattle's Capitol Hill neighborhood during ReachNow testing.
- Type: Public (subsidiary)
- Industry: Car rental
- Founded: April 8, 2016; 10 years ago
- Defunct: July 17, 2019; 7 years ago
- Successor: DriveNow
- Headquarters: 2118 3rd Avenue; Seattle, Washington, United States
- Number of locations: 1
- Key people: Steve Banfield (Chief Executive Officer)
- Services: Carsharing
- Owner: BMW Group
- Parent: BMW
- Website: www.reachnow.com

ReachNow was a carsharing service operated by BMW Group in Seattle, Portland, and Brooklyn. It launched in 2016 and it shut down its services in Seattle and Portland on July 17, 2019. It used a mobile app for car reservations and operated a fleet of over 1,000 vehicles. It was one of three car-sharing services in the city of Seattle, competing with car2go and Zipcar. ReachNow was similar to another BMW Group service DriveNow, but was focused on North American cities starting with Seattle. Unlike DriveNow which is a joint-venture with Sixt, ReachNow is a fully owned BMW subsidiary, with RideCell rather than Sixt, providing the technology platform.

== History ==
It launched in April 2016 with 370 vehicles. In May 2016, Steve Banfield was named Chief Executive Officer and the company declared that they had reached 13,000 registered members; Car2Go, the main competitor to ReachNow in Seattle, stated they had 77,000 members at the time.

In December, ReachNow announced that it would add 180 cars to its fleet in Seattle, bringing the total to 700, and lowered its minimum age requirement to 18 years old. The company is also expanding its operations to include four new Mobility Services: Reserve, Share, Fleet Solutions and a ridesharing company, ReachNow Ride, to compete with Uber and Lyft.

In March 2018, BMW and Daimler announced that their carsharing services, ReachNow and Car2go, would merge into a combined entity that would be jointly operated.

BMW cancelled ReachNow Ride in May 2019 and on July 17, 2019, announced that it would cancel all of its services in Seattle and Portland effective immediately.

== Service area ==
ReachNow initially launched in April 2016 serving a limited area of the city of Seattle, but expanded several times to eventually encompass the entire city by December. ReachNow also expanded to serve the Seattle–Tacoma International Airport in August 2016.

ReachNow expanded to Portland, Oregon, on September 19, 2016, and parts of Brooklyn, New York in November. Service in Brooklyn was suspended due to maintenance issues.

== Fleet ==
ReachNow maintained a fleet of 700 vehicles in Seattle, 360 in Portland and 260 in Brooklyn. Models included the BMW 328xi and BMW 330xi sedan, the electric i3, the Mini Cooper (in both 2-door and 4-door configurations), and the Mini Clubman. In December 2016, ReachNow added the BMW X1 to its fleet.
