= CAA-Quebec =

- Automobile et touring club du Québec
- Formation: 1984; 42 years ago
- Merger of: Automobile Club of Canada (1904); Quebec Automobile Club (1912)
- Type: Not-for-profit organization
- Headquarters: 444, rue Bouvier; Quebec City, Quebec; G2J 1E3
- Region served: Quebec
- Services: Roadside assistance, travel services, insurance
- President and CEO: Marie-Soleil Tremblay
- Subsidiaries: CAA-Quebec Travel; CAA-Quebec Auto and Residential Insurance; CAA-Quebec Foundation
- Affiliations: CAA, AAA
- Website: caaquebec.com

CAA-Quebec is a not-for-profit organization (NPO) registered with the Quebec Enterprise Register under the name Automobile et Touring Club du Québec. It is affiliated with the Canadian Automobile Association (CAA). It is also linked to the American Automobile Association (AAA) as part of the North American network of automobile clubs. Its headquarters are located in Quebec City. The organization provides assistance and advisory services to its members in several areas, such as mobility, travel, insurance, and housing. It is also involved in providing information, raising awareness, and advocating for its members’ interests at the provincial level.

== History ==
CAA-Quebec’s roots are closely tied to the automotive boom in Quebec. In 1904, the Automobile Club of Canada was founded in Montréal by businessman Andrew J. Dawes. The Club’s first official meeting took place on July 28, 1904, at the Windsor Hotel in Montréal. Back then, the organization aimed to give a voice to the first motorists and promote improvements to road infrastructure at a time when the automobile was still a novelty.

Some years later, on August 9, 1912, the Quebec Automobile Club was founded in Québec by Frank Carrel, a publisher, businessman, and key figure in the capital’s economic and social life. Ever since its founding, the Club has distinguished itself through its role as an advocate with public authorities, particularly regarding improvements to roads, signage, and driving conditions.

Since the early decades of the 20th century, both automobile clubs in Quebec have been actively involved in promoting road safety and championing motorists’ interests. In the 1920s, they established the first roadside assistance services for their members, an initiative that would become a cornerstone of their purpose and reputation.

Over time, the Clubs expanded their scope of activities. They engaged in debates surrounding the development of Quebec’s highway network and endorsed major projects, such as the construction of the Metropolitan Boulevard in Montréal in the late 1950s. At the same time, they began offering personalized travel planning and route mapping services, made possible through their affiliation with the American Automobile Association (AAA), which began in 1940 for the Québec Club and in 1953 for the Montréal Club.

In 1984, the Automobile Club of Canada and the Quebec Automobile Club merged into a single provincial organization: the Automobile and Touring Club of Quebec. This merger marked a significant milestone in the organization’s history, which went on to brand itself as CAA-Quebec, asserting its place in the CAA network while remaining true to its Quebec identity and roots.

In the following decades, CAA-Quebec further expanded its services into the areas of travel, housing, insurance, and mobility. In 2004, the organization celebrated its 100th anniversary, highlighting an entire century of commitment to serving its members and the people of Quebec.

In 2008, the establishment of the CAA-Quebec Foundation further strengthened the organization’s social and preventive role, particularly in the areas of road safety, education, and research aimed at improving the safety of road users.

Today, CAA-Quebec brings together more than 1.3 million members across the province of Quebec. The organization offers an extensive range of services in mobility, travel, insurance, and home services.

== Mission and social role ==
CAA-Quebec is a not-for-profit organization whose mission is to provide a range of assistance and advisory services to help its members with their mobility, travel plans, safeguarding their property, and coping with the unexpected. As a member-based organization, CAA-Quebec has made assistance its core focus since its founding in the early 20th century. The organization states that it also relies on a network of affiliated businesses and partners to deliver its services.

Beyond the services it provides, CAA-Quebec defends the interests of motorists and travellers. The organization participates in public debates on road safety, mobility, consumer affairs and the protection of road users, taking a nonpartisan approach with a focus on the collective interest.

Through the CAA-Quebec Foundation, which was established to support initiatives focused on road safety, education, and prevention among youth, the organization also contributes to improving road safety records and raising public awareness of issues related to vehicle use and sustainable mobility.

== Presence and organization ==
CAA-Quebec’s head office is located in Quebec City. This location houses administrative functions, corporate services, and certain operational units related to the management of the organization’s province-wide activities. In addition to its head office, CAA-Quebec maintains a primary place of business in the Greater Montréal area, where various member services and administrative activities are concentrated.

CAA-Quebec maintains an extensive regional presence across the province to serve its membership base. This presence takes the form of a network of service locations distributed across several regions of Quebec, including Montréal, Québec City, Laval, Brossard, Sherbrooke, Trois-Rivières, Saguenay, Gatineau, and Lévis. Depending on the location, these establishments offer services related to travel, mobility, insurance, vehicle registration, and member support.

Beyond its offices and physical centres, CAA-Quebec relies on a network of partners and approved businesses, including auto repair services, vehicle inspection centres, and residential suppliers, that contribute to the accessibility of its services across the entire province of Quebec. This territory-based structure ensures province-wide coverage and proximity to members, both in major urban centres and across various outlying regions.

== Governance and organizational structure ==
CAA-Quebec is a not-for-profit organization operating on a membership-based model. As such, it is governed by rules specific to member-based organizations and acts in the collective interest of its members. The organization holds an annual general meeting of members, at which its results and strategic directions are presented, among other matters.

CAA-Quebec’s governance is based on a board of directors responsible for overseeing the organization, ensuring its financial viability, and upholding its mission. Directors are elected for fixed terms and act on behalf of the members. The board of directors is responsible notably for adopting strategic directions, monitoring the organization’s overall performance, and appointing the President and Chief Executive Officer.

Executive management is responsible for day-to-day operations and the implementation of the policies approved by the board of directors. Since November 2023, the role of President and Chief Executive Officer has been held by Marie-Soleil Tremblay, the first woman to lead the organization since its founding. She reports to the board of directors and oversees all of CAA-Quebec’s operational activities.

CAA-Quebec also oversees several affiliated entities, including its travel operations, auto and home insurance activities, and driving schools in the Greater Montréal area. Revenues generated by these entities are reinvested for the benefit of the not-for-profit organization and its mission to members.

This organizational structure is designed to ensure a clear separation between governance functions and day-to-day operations, while maintaining coherence across the various activities of the CAA-Quebec group and the organization’s objectives.
