= Enjoy (car sharing) =

- Type: Società per azioni
- Industry: Car sharing
- Founded: 2013
- Headquarters: Italy
- Area served: Milan, Turin, Rome, Florence, Bologna
- Parent: Eni
- Website: enjoy.eni.com

Enjoy logo 2013–2023

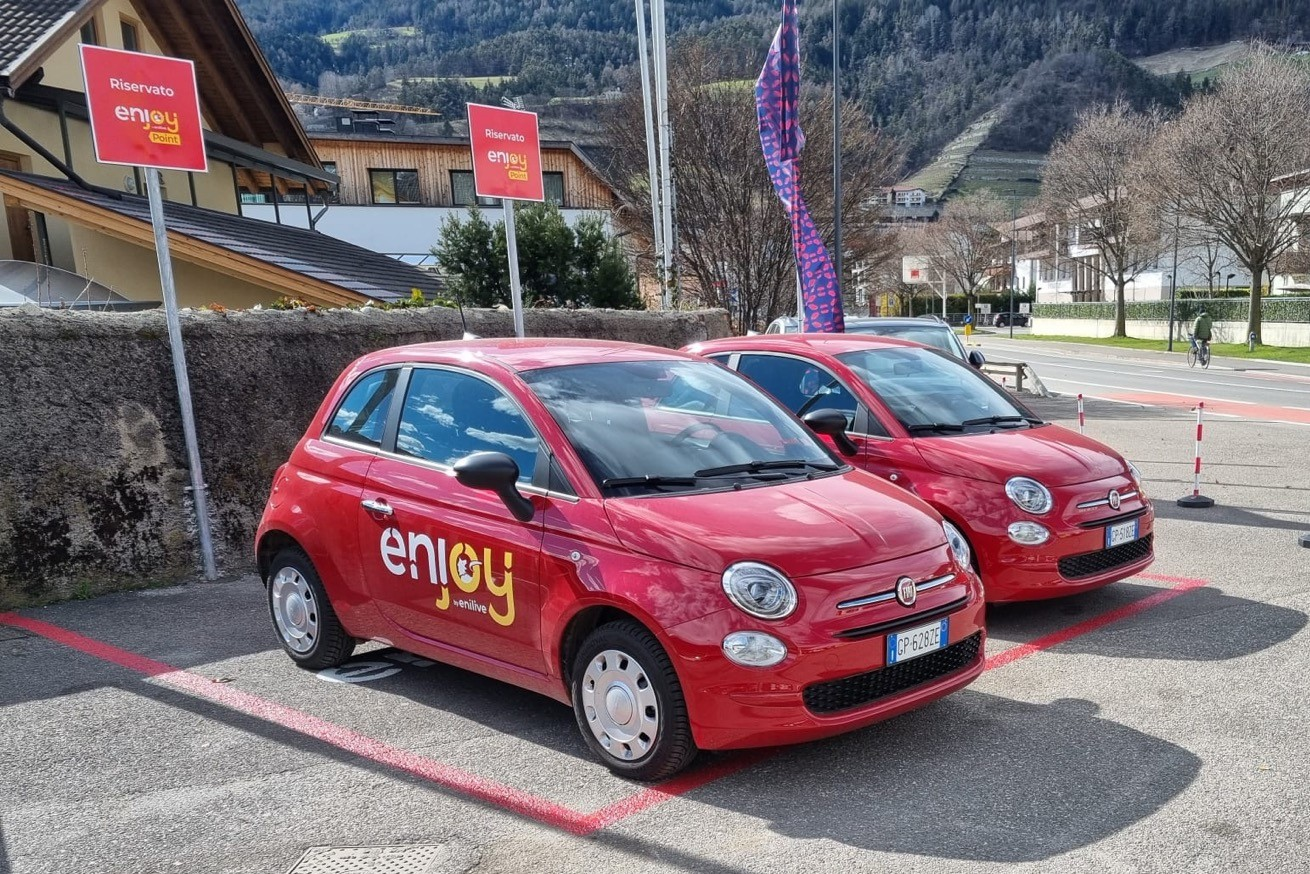
Enjoy vehicles with the new logo

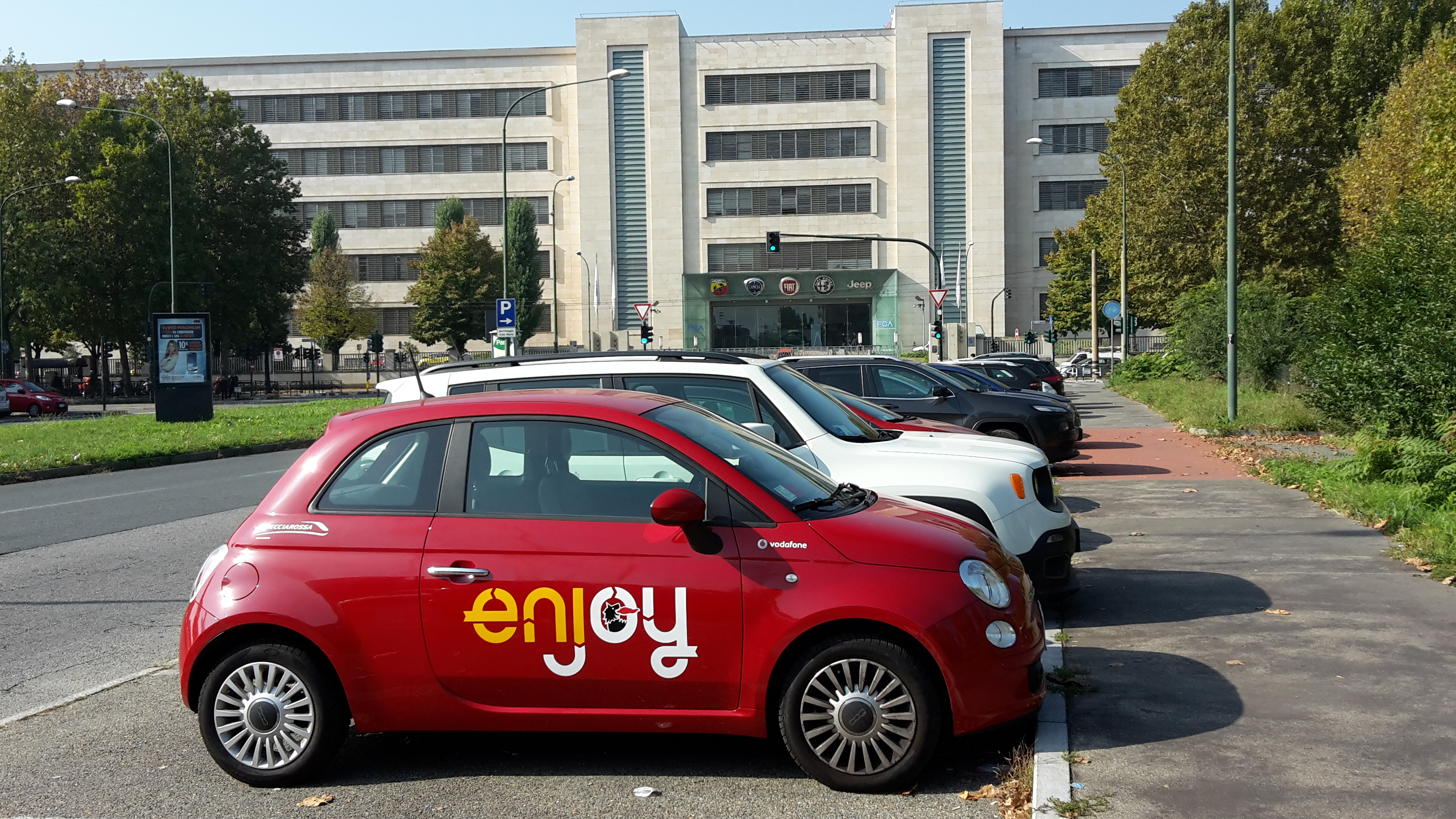
Enjoy car in Turin, Italy

Enjoy is an Italian car sharing service provided by Eni.

Enjoy is active in several Italian cities, including Milan, Turin, Rome, Florence and Bologna. Cars can be rented wherever parked via a smartphone app.

== History ==
Enjoy launched its free-floating car sharing service in December 2013 in Milan. Enjoy was launched in Rome in June 2014 and in Florence in November 2014. Starting from April 2015, the service have been extended to the city of Turin.

From 2015 until 2017 a scooter sharing service was available using Piaggio MP3 scooters.

From 19 March 2021, as a consequence of the COVID-19 pandemic that has been ongoing since the previous year, a device for the automatic sanitisation of the passenger compartments has been activated in all Enjoy sharing vehicles. Also during the first half of 2021, Enjoy introduced Fiat 500s with hybrid engines in Rome, Milan, Florence, Bologna and Turin, alongside those equipped only with the internal combustion engine.

On 23 May 2022, Enjoy introduced a fleet of 100 ultra-compact XEV Yoyo electric cars in Turin, alongside its existing vehicles. These were subsequently also activated in Bologna, Florence, and Milan.

Since its introduction, Enjoy has recorded over 30 million rentals and has a customer base of over 1 million people.

== Enjoy Points ==
On November 20, 2023, Enjoy launched Enjoy Points, new Enilive service stations that also serve as rental locations for its fleet of vehicles. These new rental locations allow users to travel throughout Italy. In 2025, Enjoy Points are present for the first time in all Italian regions, at over 100 strategic locations to facilitate interchange with private and public transport.

== See also ==
- Car2go – a similar service also active in Italy
