= Free2Move =

French car sharing company

- A Free2Move vehicle in Berlin, Germany
- Predecessors: TravelCar; Share Now; DriveNow
- Founded: 12 December 2012
- Headquarters: Paris, France
- Number of locations: 16 cities, 170 countries
- Area served: Worldwide
- Key people: Carlos Tavares
- Services: Carsharing
- Owner: Stellantis (2021–present); PSA Group (2016–2021)
- Number of employees: 150
- Parent: Stellantis
- Subsidiaries: Share Now; DriveNow
- Website: www.free2move.com

Free2move is a French company based in Paris, subsidiary of Stellantis, founded in 2016, offering a carsharing service in 14 cities around the world, including Paris, Berlin, and Vienna.

Free2move Carsharing Solutions Inc, formerly PSA North America Carsharing Solutions Inc, is Free2Move's U.S. subsidiary, initially located in Atlanta, Georgia, before being relocated into the Stellantis North America headquarters in Detroit, Michigan.

== History ==
=== 2016: Creation by PSA Group ===
On 28 September 2016, Carlos Tavares, CEO of the PSA Peugeot-Citroën Group, announced the launch of Free2move. This new brand federates, through a platform, all new mobility services to satisfy the different travel needs of its 15 million customers.

=== 2017: Acquisition of TravelCar and expansion into the US ===
In 2017, the French group PSA Peugeot-Citroën acquired 22% of the French start-up TravelCar, founded by Ahmed Mhiri, before increasing its stake to 99% in 2019, integrating it into Free2Move in 2020. In the same year, PSA took over GHM Mobile Development's entire stake in the German start-up CarJump, which develops a car-sharing solutions application. Its director, Michel Stumpe, will continue to manage the application, which will be integrated into Free2move.

On 25 October 2018, PSA Group (Peugeot-Citroën) made its return to the US official with the launch of Free2move in Washington with its subsidiary PSA North America Carsharing Solutions, Inc. Until the group's vehicles are approved, the service will offer cars from Chevrolet. Germany's Michel Stumpe appointed head of PSA North America's Carsharing Solutions division.

=== 2022: acquisition of Share Now ===
In 2020, Free2move had almost 1.2 million customers worldwide and is present in 170 countries. In 2022, Stellantis (formerly PSA and Fiat-Chrysler) acquired the German carsharing company Share Now (formerly Car2go and DriveNow), the European leader in the sector formed by BMW and Mercedes-Benz, which was making heavy losses. The company is gradually integrated into Free2move.

2024: Free2move workforce reduction

In 2024, Free2move, a global mobility services provider and a subsidiary of Stellantis, reportedly reduced its workforce by approximately 90 to 100 employees as part of a cost-saving initiative. The layoffs followed the company’s acquisition of Share Now, after which Free2move faced challenges in sustaining operational expenses. Some employees were offered voluntary resignation packages, while other positions were eliminated. Additionally, the company began expanding its recruitment in Tunisia to optimize costs related to human resources and operations.

== See also ==
- Carpool
