= Canadian Automobile Association =

Canadian not-for-profit organization

- Association canadienne des automobilistes
- Formation: 1913; 113 years ago
- Registration no.: 100760131RC0001
- Legal status: Not-for-profit
- Headquarters: 500-1545 Carling Avenue; Ottawa, Ontario K1Z 8P9
- Affiliations: AIT, FIA
- Website: caa.ca

The Canadian Automobile Association (CAA; French: Association canadienne des automobilistes) is a federation of eight regional not-for-profit automobile associations in Canada, founded in 1913. The constituent associations (also called "clubs") are responsible for providing roadside assistance, auto touring and leisure travel services, insurance services, and member discount programs within their service territories. The CAA National Office in Ottawa coordinates relations between the clubs, oversees joint initiatives, and lobbies the federal government. In 2020 and 2021, the Gustavson Brand Trust Index named CAA the most trusted brand in Canada.

CAA is not affiliated with the London, Ontario-based Dominion Automobile Association (c. 1948) or consumer groups such as the Automobile Protection Agency.

== Lobbying ==
The CAA considers itself to be an advocate for Canada's motorists and travellers. CAA is an active political lobby for Canadian consumers, pursuing the interests of drivers and travellers in public consultations over urban planning and public transit. CAA has lobbied to put in place stronger consumer protection laws for air passengers, commenting in support of Bill C-49, a bill to improve various air passenger rights, before a House of Commons committee in 2017.

== Clubs ==
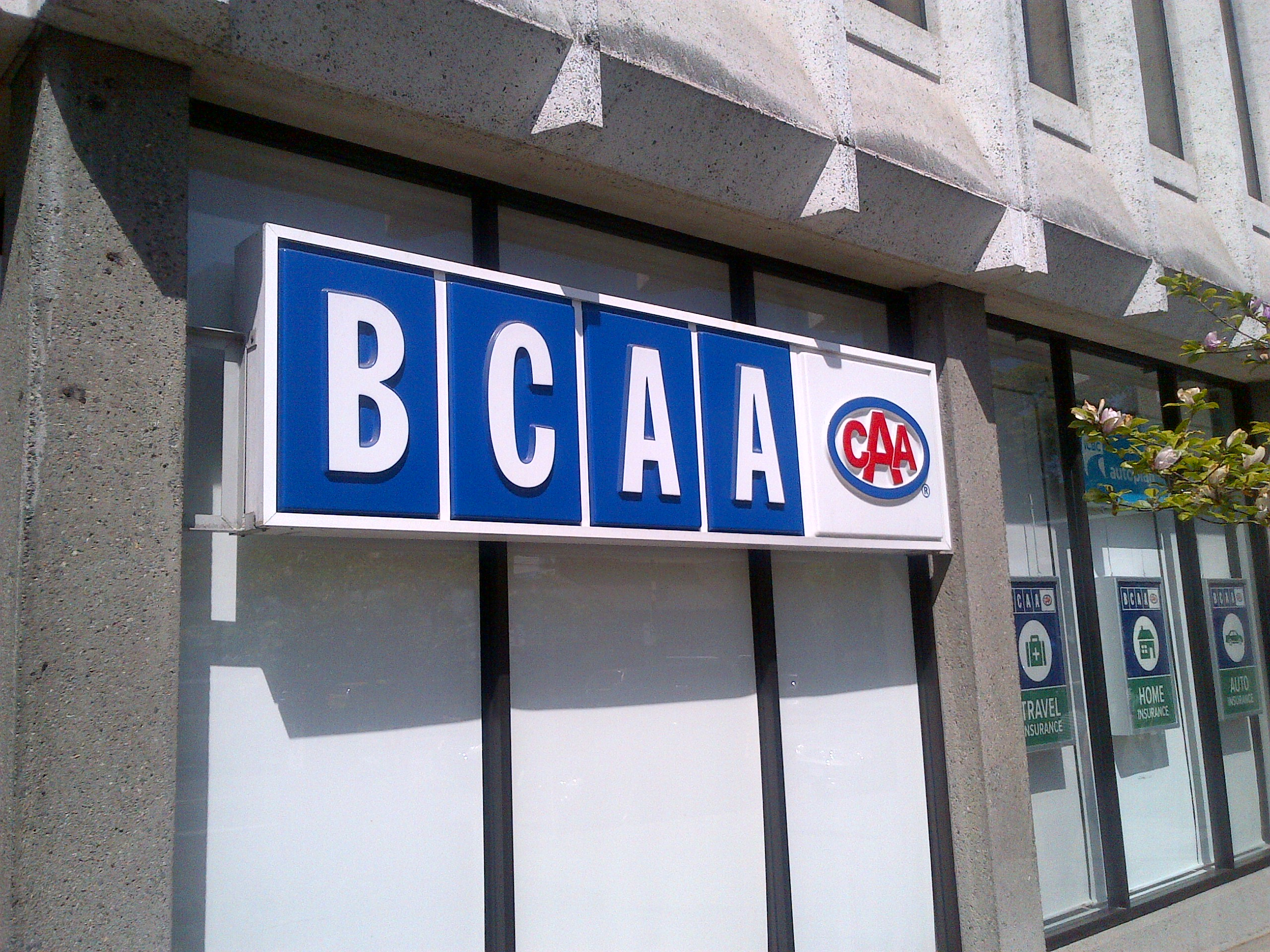
BCAA signage outside of Vancouver office includes CAA logo

As of 2016, CAA consists of eight autonomous clubs, if counting CAA Club Group as a single club operating under both the CAA South Central Ontario and CAA Manitoba brands. Some clubs serve multiple provinces and/or territories, while others operate in a single province. The province of Ontario is split into three territories, with most of the province split between two clubs of comparable size; the third club (CAA Niagara) operates in a single regional municipality covering about 3% of the province's population.

Club	Brand	Service territory	Notes
Alberta Motor Association	AMA	Alberta, Northwest Territories	
British Columbia Automobile Association	BCAA	British Columbia, Yukon	
CAA Atlantic (Note: Often shortened in marketing to simply "CAA" unless the geographical reference is needed)		New Brunswick, Nova Scotia, Prince Edward Island, Newfoundland and Labrador	
CAA Club Group (CCG)	CAA Manitoba	Manitoba, Nunavut	Merged in 2016, continue to operate separate branding
CAA Club Group (CCG)	CAA South Central Ontario	Southern Ontario (excluding Niagara Region and most of Eastern Ontario), plus Algoma District (Note: Specifically, the counties of Wellington, Perth, Oxford, Middlesex, Elgin, Norfolk, Hastings, Prince Edward, Frontenac, Lennox and Addington, Peterborough, Northumberland, Haldimand, Haliburton, Essex, Lambton, Grey, Bruce, Huron, Dufferin, Brant, Simcoe, and the portion of Leeds-Grenville formerly known as Leeds; the Regional Municipalities of Durham, Peel, Halton, Waterloo and York; the districts of Algoma and Muskoka; and the cities of Kawartha Lakes, Chatham-Kent, Hamilton and Toronto)	Merged in 2016, continue to operate separate branding
CAA North & East Ontario		Most of Northern and Eastern Ontario (Note: Specifically, the counties of Dundas, Glengarry, Lanark, Prescott, Renfrew, Russell, Stormont, and the portion of Leeds-Grenville formerly known as Grenville County; the districts of Cochrane, Manitoulin, Nipissing, Parry Sound, Sudbury, Timiskaming, Kenora (including area of Patricia), Rainy River, and Thunder Bay; and the cities of Ottawa and Greater Sudbury)	
CAA Niagara		Regional Municipality of Niagara in Ontario	
Saskatchewan Motor Club	CAA Saskatchewan	Saskatchewan	
Automobile et touring club du Québec	CAA-Quebec	Quebec	

=== Alberta Motor Association (AMA) ===
The Alberta Motor Association (AMA) is a non-profit membership organization serving Alberta and the Northwest Territories. The organization was founded in 1926 with 1400 members; original dues were $6.50.

It is headquartered in Edmonton and is affiliated with the Canadian Automobile Association (CAA) and the American Automobile Association (AAA) and has over 1 million members as of August 2024. The Alberta Motor Association provides its members with roadside assistance service, a range of auto touring and leisure travel services, insurance services, and member discounts and rewards with participating partners. AMA Financial has also begun offering a variety of mortgage and Guaranteed Investment Certificate products to members.

The Association was named one of Canada’s most trusted brands for 7th Year in 2023. AMA operates Western Canada’s largest travel agency, AMA Travel. AMA publishes its member's Magazine AMA Insider from its Edmonton Headquarters. The association also owns Bridgewater Bank, a Calgary-based chartered bank.

On August 8, 2016, the AMA announced that an executive was dismissed for cause related to "fraudulent activity". The Canadian Broadcasting Corporation reported the AMA had commenced a lawsuit against the former vice-president of information technology seeking recovery of $8.2 million CAD related to fraudulent invoices.

=== CAA Club Group (CCG) ===
CAA Club Group
- Type: Not for Profit
- Industry: Automobile association
- Predecessors: CAA South Central Ontario; CAA Manitoba
- Founded: 2016
- Headquarters: Thornhill, Ontario; Winnipeg, Manitoba
- Subsidiaries: CAA Insurance; Echelon Insurance; Orion Travel Insurance
- Website: www.caasco.com

CAA Club Group was formed in 2016 by the merger of CAA South Central Ontario with CAA Manitoba, is an affiliated club of the Canadian Automobile Association (CAA) in the Canadian provinces and territories of Manitoba, Nunavut, and parts of Ontario. It is a not for profit organization with its head offices located in Thornhill, Ontario and Winnipeg, Manitoba. CAA Club Group primarily provides roadside assistance, auto, property & travel insurance services, as well as leisure travel services to its members.

==== CAA Manitoba ====
CAA Manitoba can trace its origins to the creation of the Winnipeg Auto Club in 1904, the first club of its kind in Canada. The organization later evolved into the Manitoba Motor League, becoming an integral part of motoring history in the province – from developing the first road map, to marking highways, to implementing road safety programs. The MML was renamed CAA Manitoba in 1993. Today CAA Manitoba represents more than 190,000 members and has expanded beyond emergency road service to include a full service travel agency, home and property insurance and travel products. CAA Manitoba is actively engaged in advocacy issues, most recently with its 'Move Over Manitoba' campaign to convince the provincial government to extend to tow truck operators the same protective measures that cover emergency roadside personnel.

==== CAA South Central Ontario ====
The Toronto Automobile Club was founded on May 4, 1903. By this time like-minded motorists were forming their own clubs throughout Ontario to exchange and share information about their vehicles. In 1907 the Toronto Automobile Club and clubs representing Hamilton, Ottawa and Kingston formed the Ontario Motor League (OML) with the purpose of helping automobile owners to lobby governments, as opposition to the automobile was extensive at the time. It had a paid membership from the various clubs of 170 active, and 56 associate, individual members.

In Ontario, the CAA was formerly the 'Ontario Motor League'. It facilitates Ontario's Drive Clean program from the CAA locations that double as Ministry of Transport licence renewal and vehicle registration offices. The Ontario Motor League originally was not affiliated with the CAA or AAA.

The OML set up various committees such as the Legislative and Good Roads Committee and also started a Touring Bureau which informed members where they could drive without getting mired in mud, and which hotels would provide gas and water. New automobile clubs sprang up across Ontario, amalgamating in time with others, but still using the OML as a unifying organization to represent motorists to the government of Ontario. Over time, the names of both the individual clubs and the OML changed. By 1996, the old Toronto Automobile Club was known as CAA Central Ontario, and the OML as CAA Ontario which still exists as a formal organization to help represent the remaining clubs to the Government of Ontario.

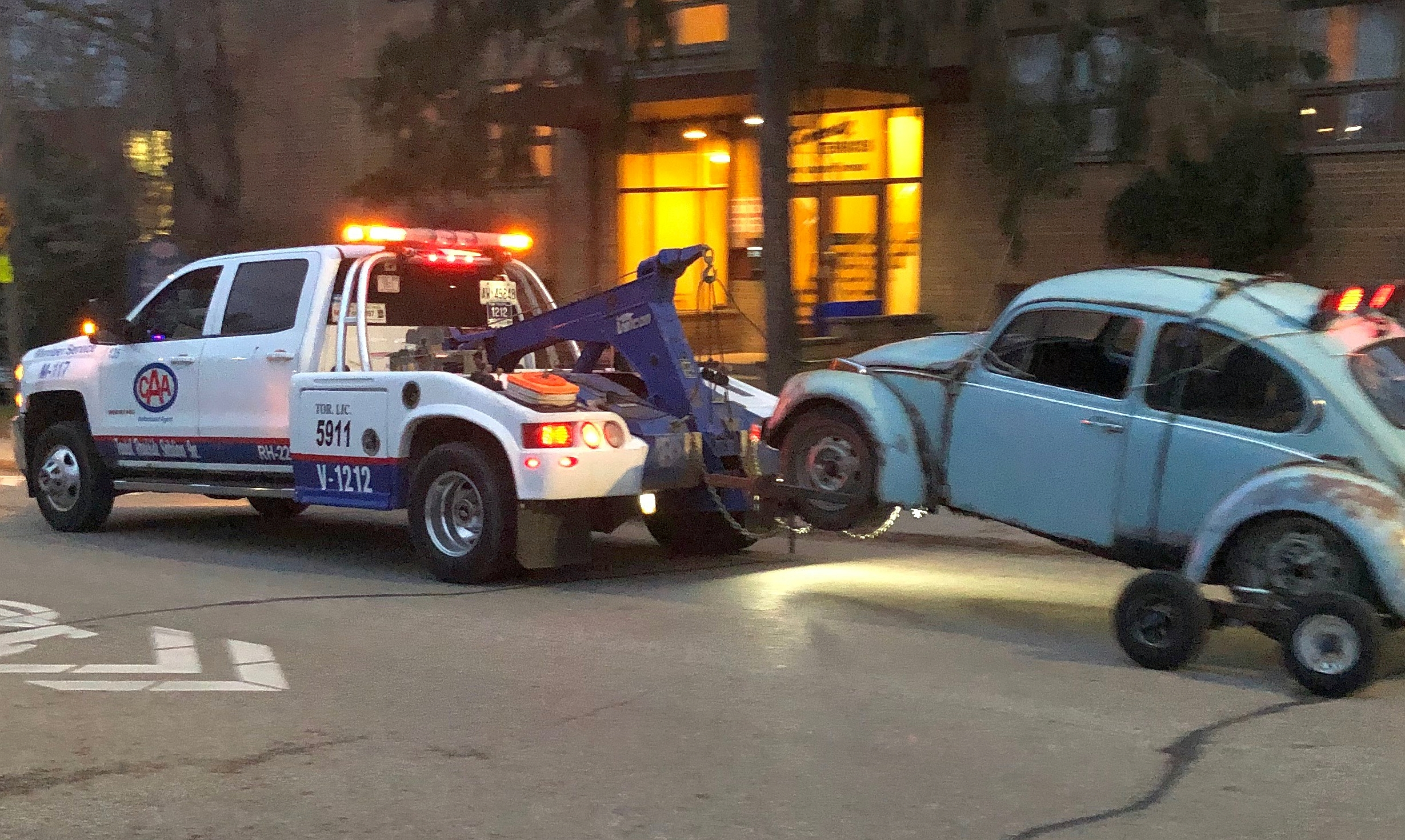
CAA tow truck in Toronto

In 2005, after mergers with CAA Eastern Ontario, CAA Peterborough, CAA Windsor, CAA Mid-western Ontario and the former CAA South Central Ontario (Hamilton and region), CAA Central Ontario took the name CAA South Central Ontario. It has over 2 million members and covers the entire province except for the Niagara Region (CAA Niagara) and the far north and eastern (including Ottawa) regions of the province (CAA North and East Ontario).

CAA South Central Ontario covers the City of Toronto, and the following areas in Ontario: Districts of Algoma and Muskoka, Counties of Bruce, Dufferin, Elgin, Essex, Frontenac, Grey, Haliburton, Hastings, Huron, Lambton, Leeds and Grenville, Lennox and Addington, Middlesex, Northumberland, Oxford, Perth, Peterborough, Prince Edward, Simcoe, Wellington and City of Kawartha Lakes, Regional Municipalities of Brant County, Chatham-Kent, Durham, Haldimand-Norfolk, Halton, Hamilton-Wentworth, Peel, Waterloo and York.

=== CAA Saskatchewan ===
CAA Saskatchewan is a non-profit membership organization serving Saskatchewan affiliated with the Canadian Automobile Association (CAA) and the AAA (formerly American Automobile Association). The organization's headquarters are located in Regina, Saskatchewan, and it has over 184,000 members as of May 2010 and provides them with roadside assistance service, a range of auto touring and leisure travel services, insurance services, vehicle repair and sales services, and member discounts with preferred companies. CAA Saskatchewan is also an advocate for motoring and related consumer issues and a supplier of automotive and other travel services.

CAA Saskatchewan, formerly the Saskatchewan Motor League, has been in operation since 1917 and was organized by Frederick E. Betts. The association includes automotive sales and service facilities, a travel agency and an insurance agency. Besides providing a full range of travel services and packages, CAA Saskatchewan also owns and operates its own motorcoach company, WestWorld Tours, which offers fully escorted tours to a variety of North American destinations. CAA Saskatchewan's insurance agency offers a wide range of insurance products, from basic coverage to all-risk comprehensive policies, for home and property, auto, health & dental, travel and life insurance, with added benefits and savings for CAA Saskatchewan Members. The Show Your Card & Save program also provides Members savings at thousands of attractions, retailers and merchants throughout the world, with point-of-sale discounts and the opportunity to earn CAA Dollars which can be redeemed on CAA merchandise and services.

== Membership levels ==
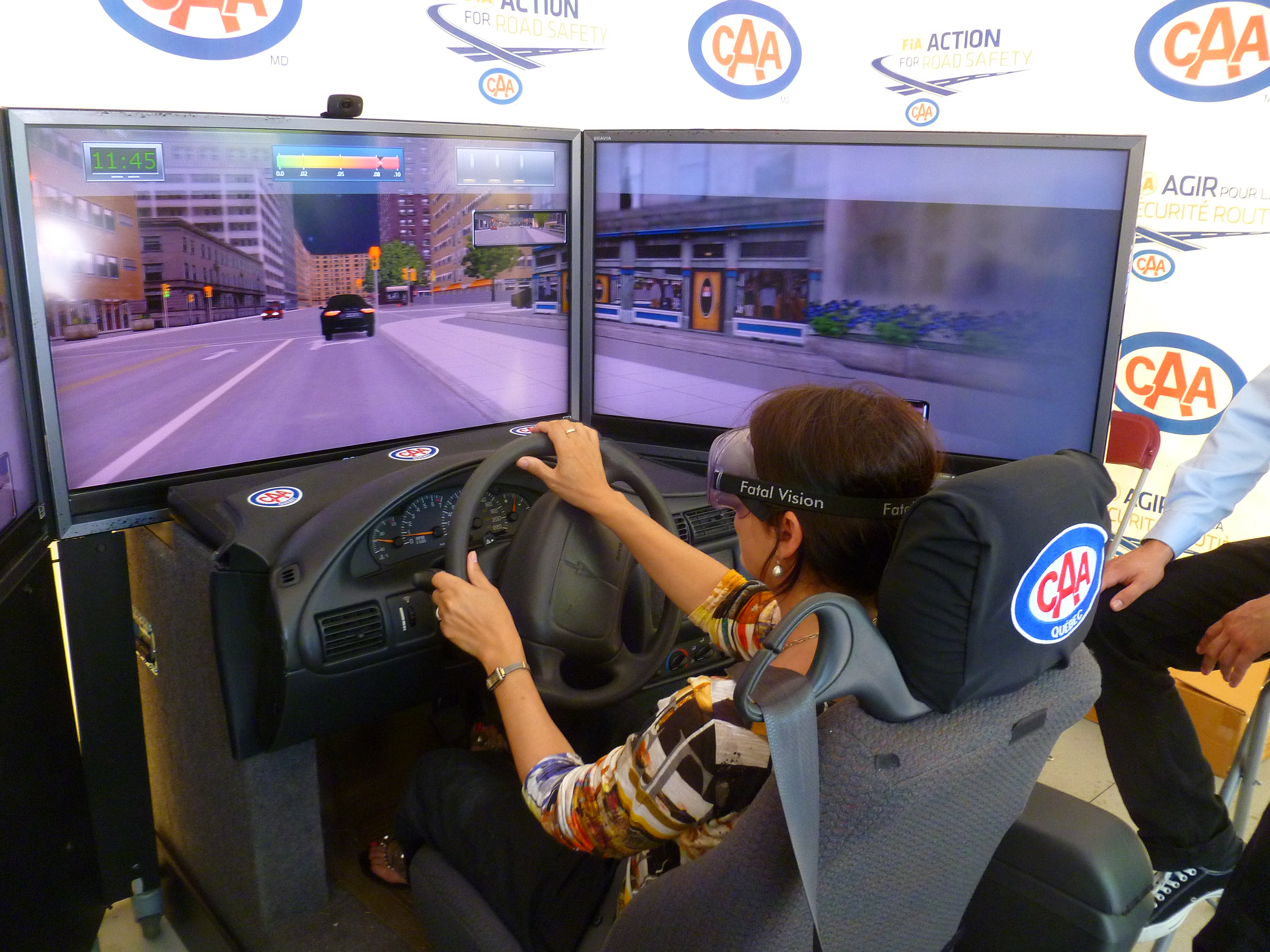
Drunk driving simulation being demonstrated by the CAA-Québec

Membership benefits and pricing varies by club; however, membership levels can generally be categorized as follows:

- Everyday / Value / Community / Go (red, green, or purple card) – includes access to CAA discounts; includes at least one Bike Assist call per year (except Saskatchewan and B.C.); does not include motor vehicle roadside assistance; BCAA version includes Evo Car Share membership
- Basic / Classic (blue card) — includes access to CAA discounts plus up to four roadside assistance calls per year with up to 10 km towing distance; does not include motorcycle coverage in most territories
- Plus (gold card) — in addition to Basic / Classic benefits: extended roadside assistance with up to 200 km towing distance; RV coverage option available; other improved benefits
- Premier (black card) — in addition to Plus benefits: at least one tow of up to 320 km per year

From at least early 2020 to September 2023, CAA South Central Ontario offered a program focused on transit users and cyclists called "On the Move powered by CAA" (green card) which included access to most CAA discounts and one Bike Assist call per year, but no other roadside assistance. This was discontinued and merged with CAA SCO's previous red-card (À La Carte) plan as the Everyday plan in September 2023.

Membership benefits include discounts at restaurants, affiliated insurance companies, and on fuel and other products at Shell Canada stations (nationwide as of September 2024; previously CAA-Quebec had a separate partnership with Couche-Tard).

== Publications ==
Historically, each CAA club distributed a print magazine to its members. Beginning in 2023, six clubs (counting South Central Ontario and Manitoba as separate clubs) jointly distributed a magazine produced by Finally Content, known as AMA Insider in Alberta and CAA Magazine elsewhere, with slight differences between regions. CAA NEO moved to an online-only magazine format in late 2022, while BCAA ceased publication of its magazine following the fall 2023 issue, both citing environmental impacts. For similar reasons, CAA-Quebec discontinued its separately-produced magazines at the end of 2024, while the remaining clubs that had partnered with Finally Content transitioned to a digital-only format at around the same time.

== See also ==
- American Automobile Association
- AA Limited – the British motoring association
- Evo Car Share – a carsharing service created by BCAA
- Fédération Internationale de l'Automobile
