= Frederick E. Betts =

Canadian ice hockey administrator and businessman (1870–1942)

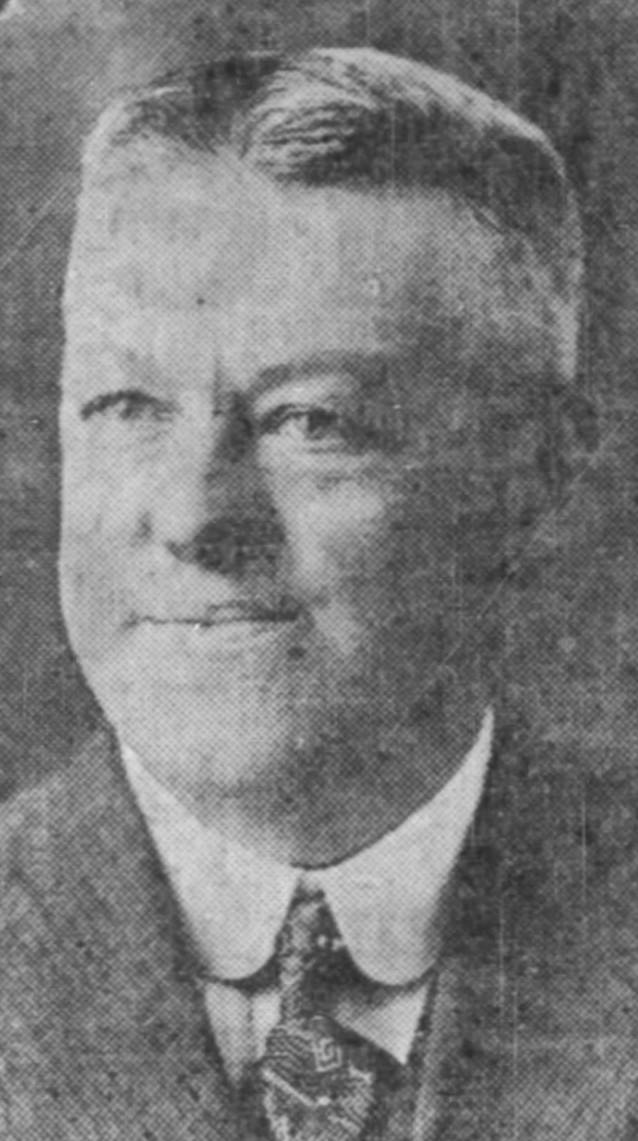
- Born: October 17, 1870; Nova Scotia, Canada
- Died: February 23, 1942 (aged 71); Chilliwack, British Columbia, Canada
- Occupation: Businessman
- Known for: Canadian Amateur Hockey Association; Saskatchewan Amateur Hockey Association; Amateur Athletic Union of Canada; Saskatchewan and Alberta Motor Leagues

Frederick Everett Betts (October 17, 1870 – February 23, 1942) was a Canadian ice hockey administrator and businessman. He concurrently served as president of the Canadian Amateur Hockey Association (CAHA), the Saskatchewan Amateur Hockey Association, and the Saskatchewan branch of the Amateur Athletic Union of Canada during the 1919–20 season. He sought regulations to govern amateur sport in Canada, which he felt was in a state of disrepute due to the lack of discussion and meetings during World War I. He supported the reinstatement of former professionals as amateur athletes as favoured in Western Canada, despite the growing rift with delegates from Eastern Canada on the issue. He sought for the Allan Cup trustees to allow the CAHA to have more say into how the national playoffs were operated and argued for receiving an annual percentage of profits from gate receipts to allow the CAHA to govern effectively.

Betts rose to sporting prominence as the manager of senior ice hockey in Saskatoon, had established a clubhouse atmosphere to foster clean athletics in the city, and had hustled to revive interest in amateur sport in Saskatchewan. He was named to the Canadian Olympic Association in preparation for the 1920 Summer Olympics, and later managed the Saskatoon Crescents Hockey Club in the Western Canada Hockey League for the 1922–23 season. By the end of his hockey career, Betts was "noted for his genial and philosophical outlook upon life", and skilled as "the most prolific and entertaining author of hockey letters" that were "lengthy, profound, well-worded, interesting and to the point".

Betts was the Saskatoon dealer for the Scripps-Booth car, and secretary of the Saskatoon Retail Merchants Association. Hired as an organizer by the Saskatchewan Motor League, he established 37 automobile clubs in Northern Saskatchewan within one year. He lobbied the provincial government for highway improvements and succeeded in having uniform traffic signs and mileposts installed. He wanted more vehicle owners to install dimmers on headlights, and advocated for enforcement of no-glare laws for driving at night. He sought to increase membership in the motor leagues to fight against the rising cost of vehicle licence fees, and for any fees collected to be set aside for annual maintenance of roads. He was later contracted to organize clubs for the Alberta Motor League after the Saskatchewan Motor League had been the most active provincial league in Canada under his leadership.

== Early life and family ==
Frederick Everett Betts was born on October 17, 1870, in Nova Scotia, Canada, the son of Robert Betts and Eliza Ann Sampson. His father was born in Nova Scotia with English heritage, and his mother was born in the United States. During his younger years, Betts was an athlete who played football, baseball, bicycle racing and track and field sports in the Eastern United States. He was a fan of baseball and attended home games for the Providence Grays and recalled seeing games at the Polo Grounds. His favourite player was Cap Anson, who he felt was one of the game's greatest first basemen. Betts later settled in Saskatoon, Saskatchewan, and was married to Harriett B. Betts of Nova Scotia.

== Early hockey career ==
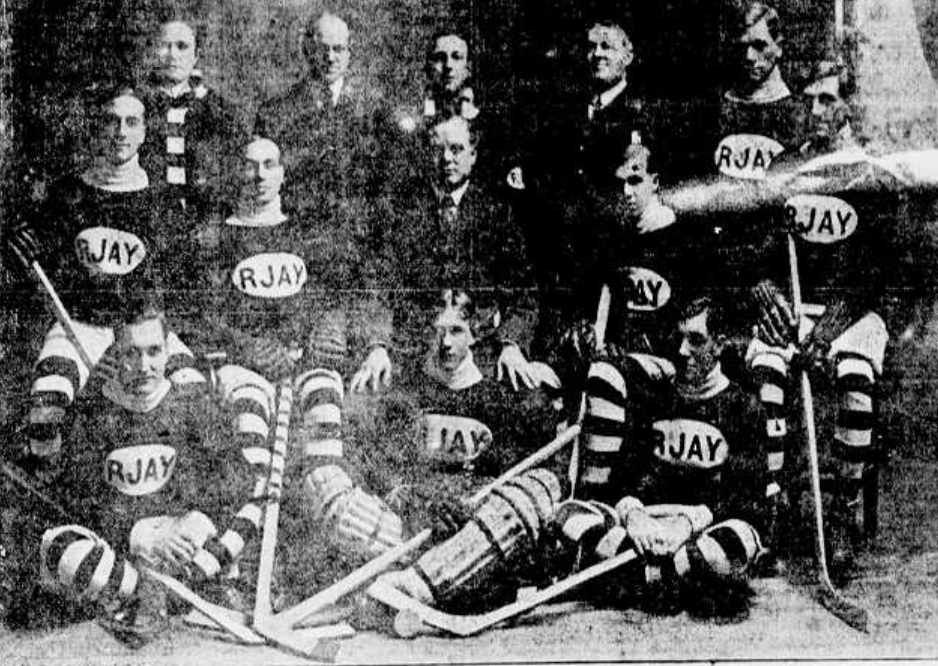
Saskatoon R-Jay hockey team in 1914

Betts was a recreational ice hockey player in Saskatoon, and served on the executive of the Saskatchewan Hockey League until his resignation in 1916. During the 1913–14 season, he was the secretary-treasurer of the Saskatoon R-Jay senior ice hockey team.

=== Saskatoon Pilgrims ===
Betts was president of the Saskatoon Pilgrims from 1915 to 1917 season, and attracted record crowds to watch senior hockey under his leadership of the team. He led efforts to establish a clubhouse for the Pilgrims located on the top floor of the Royal Bank Building, which included a gymnasium with exercise equipment, a sitting area and a reading room. In addition to keeping the players in good shape, he wanted the clubhouse atmosphere to foster clean athletics for Saskatoon.

In April 1916, Betts agreed to race a two-person 50 yd (46 m) dash to raise funds for the Saskatoon Patriotic Fund during World War I, which the Saskatoon Daily Star stated would be a "great sporting race". His opponent was Roy "Tiny" Luck, a local gun club member and trap shooter who weighed in at 332 lb (151 kg), and vowed to win what he called a "fat man's race". Betts weighed in at 226 lb (103 kg) and promised to embark on a training regimen in the Pilgrims' team room in advance of the race.

The Pilgrims won the northern division of the Saskatchewan Hockey League during the 1915–16 season, and travelled to Winnipeg in the following season to play the Toronto Dentals in a semi-final game for the fourth challenge of the 1917 Allan Cup playoffs. Betts was credited by The Leader for instilling a fighting spirit into the Pilgrims who challenged the Regina Victorias for the league's title, and was lauded by The Saskatoon Phoenix for turning the Pilgrims into "the biggest success of hockey that Saskatoon [had] ever known".

=== Saskatchewan hockey ===
Betts served as vice-president of the Saskatchewan Amateur Hockey Association (SAHA) for the 1917–18 and 1918–19 seasons, and helped co-ordinate junior ice hockey teams in Saskatoon for the Saskatchewan Junior Hockey League. In 1918, Betts and the SAHA approved the establishment of an intermediate level division, and the concept of reinstating former professionals as amateurs who were no longer playing sport for money.

After being inactive during World War I, the Amateur Athletic Union of Canada (AAU of C) resumed meeting and governance of amateur sports in Canada. Betts was elected vice-president of the Saskatchewan branch of the AAU of C in December 1918. The branch favoured the principle of soldiers who were professional athletes before the war, could be reinstated as amateurs. The Regina Evening Post credited the SAHA for having revived interest in amateur sport in Saskatchewan, and described Betts as "the original 'ginger kid' of Saskatchewan athletics", one of the "live wires" of the province, and "a hustler ... who gets results [with] few equals".

Betts supported a recommendation for Saskatoon City Council to take over the lease and management of the Crescent Arena, and to provide necessary upgrades for senior and junior hockey teams to play in the provincial league. He reported that the alterations being made by the rink's operator would not provide an ice surface of regulation size and that Saskatoon would be without high level hockey for the season. Betts arranged a schedule for a Saskatoon league instead, without any teams in the provincial leagues.

== Amateur hockey president ==
The Memorial Cup was the championship trophy for amateur junior ice hockey overseen by the CAHA.

In March 1919, the Canadian Amateur Hockey Association (CAHA) held its first annual meeting since 1915 due to World War I. The SAHA was given the turn to choose the president, and nominated Betts to succeed James T. Sutherland. The CAHA adopted the rules of play used in the Ontario Hockey Association for Allan Cup for senior competition, assumed control of competition for the Memorial Cup and the Abbott Cup for junior competition, and agreed to form an alliance with the Amateur Athletic Union which oversaw ice hockey in the United States.

Betts was opposed to the continued postponement of the AAU of C annual meeting due to post-war economic reasons. He felt that amateur sport was in a state of disrepute by not discussing the issues, and wanted to see regulations to prevent disagreements. He was opposed to the mingling of professionals and amateurs on the same team, but supported exhibition games where amateur teams played against professional teams. He also supported the reinstatement of professionals as amateurs, but insisted on penalties for athletes who broke amateur eligibility rules.

The first AAU of C annual meeting since 1914, was held at the Château Laurier in Ottawa in September 1919. Betts spoke in favour of a motion by western delegates to allow the reinstatement of former professional athletes as amateurs, despite a growing rift in Canada on the proposal. Eastern delegates were firmly against the motion, and believed that "once a professional, always a professional". A compromise was reached when the AAU of C granted Western Canada branches temporary permission to reinstate professionals as amateurs for the upcoming hockey season, but that such players would be ineligible for the national Allan Cup playoffs.

The Allan Cup was the championship trophy for amateur senior ice hockey overseen by the CAHA.

In November 1919, Betts was elected as president of the SAHA for the 1919–20 season. He became president of the Saskatchewan branch of the AAU of C in December 1919, was named to the national committee for AAU of C championships, and set a deadline of December 31 for any former professional to apply for reinstatement as an amateur. Betts added another presidency to his responsibilities when chosen to lead the Saskatoon division of the Saskatchewan Intermediate Hockey League for the 1919–20 season.

The SAHA sought the recognition of reinstated professionals in the Allan Cup playoffs, then withdrew from competition when the cup's trustees refused. Betts resigned as president of the Saskatchewan branch of the AAU of C for personal health and business reasons on March 24, 1920. The next day, he submitted his resignation as president of the SAHA effective on April 15, and cited health reasons for wanting to reduce his travel. The Saskatoon Daily Star speculated that the disagreements and the indecision on the SAHA executive contributed to Betts's resignations.

During the 1920 Allan Cup playoffs, Betts expressed concerns that the Toronto Varsity Blues men's ice hockey team had violated the rules by participating in both the Ontario Hockey Association and the Canadian Interuniversity Athletics Union playoffs. At the 1920 general meeting, the CAHA decided that the team was eligible for the Allan Cup. Betts and Allan Cup trustee William Northey formed a committee to discuss the CAHA having more say into how the Allan Cup playoffs were operated. Betts sought to end the financial struggles of operating the CAHA and to receive adequate financial compensation. He argued that the Allan Cup playoffs were the primary source of income for the CAHA, and that the lack of working capital made it difficult to have meetings and govern effectively. He sought a provision that gave a set percentage of gate receipts to the CAHA annually, as opposed to funds being distributed solely at the discretion of the cup's trustees.

== Later hockey career ==
Betts was named to the board of governors for the Canadian Olympic Association which prepared for the 1920 Summer Olympics in Belgium. He was succeeded as president of the CAHA on March 31, 1920, by H. J. Sterling of the Thunder Bay Amateur Hockey Association.

The AAU of C appointed a commission to investigate into the amateur status of hockey players in Canada in May 1921. Betts wrote to the commission and argued to resolved the disputes on amateurism for the sake of the fans, and wanted to see an end to hockey authorities ignoring the regulations if the local team had a chance to win the Allan Cup. Betts was appointed as the western representative to the commission in June 1921, by then CAHA president W. R. Granger who was sympathetic to Betts's cause and wanted to end the differences between east and west. Betts was unable to travel to the commission's meeting in Toronto and recommended another representative from Saskatoon instead.

At the general meeting of the SAHA in November 1921, northern and southern delegates disagreed on how to interpret the constitution, then passed a motion by Betts to divide the SAHA in two pending approval by the CAHA. The SAHA later decided on operating as one association with separate divisions for the north and south. Betts was named to the organizing committee for the north, which formed teams at the intermediate level.

=== Saskatoon Crescents ===
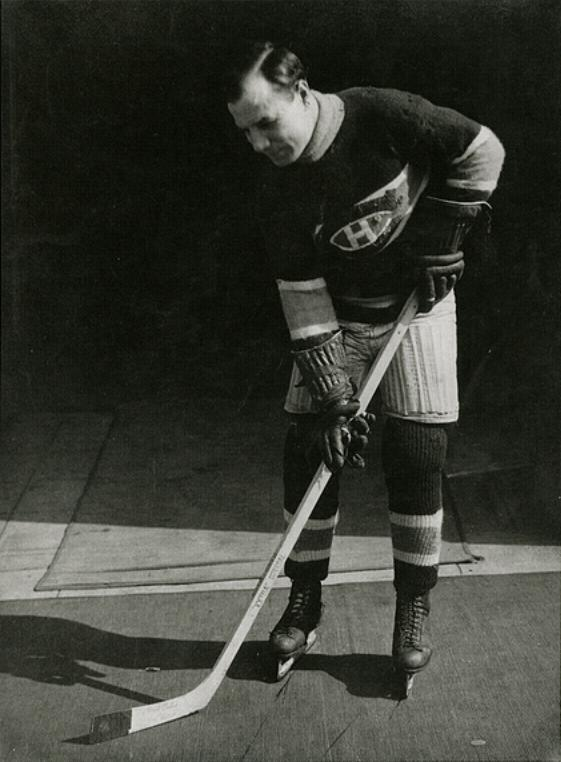
Newsy Lalonde with the Montreal Canadiens

The Saskatoon Crescents Hockey Club was reorganized in April 1922, and Betts joined the team's board of directors. He was appointed chairman of the team's management committee, made the final decision on player contracts, and had a policy of not making statements to the media until a deal was final. He represented the Crescents at meetings of the Western Canada Hockey League (WCHL), and in joint meetings with the Pacific Coast Hockey Association (PCHA) for a mutual working agreement and inter-league play.

PCHA president Frank Patrick felt that the WCHL would have strong leadership for the season. He wrote that Betts was "noted for his genial and philosophical outlook upon life", skilled at writing letters, and that "his name [was] likely to go down in hockey history as the most prolific and entertaining author of hockey letters". The Saskatoon Daily Star anticipated a successful season for the Crescents, and described Betts as "an authority on hockey constitutions before and since his time", and that his letters were "lengthy, profound, well-worded, interesting and to the point".

Betts signed ten new players to contracts by November in addition to three players who returned from the previous season. He sought to sign Newsy Lalonde from the Montreal Canadiens, and was willing to buy Lalonde's release pending all other National Hockey League clubs waiving their right to claim him. Betts later agreed to trade the rights to highly-touted prospect Aurèle Joliat to bring Lalonde to the Crescents as the team's player-coach for the season.

The Crescents won eight of thirty games played, placed fourth during the 1922–23 WCHL season and did not qualify for the playoffs, despite that Lalonde led the league with 30 goals scored. Betts retired as chairman of the management committee in May 1923, when new ownership assumed control of the Crescents.

== Motor leagues organizer ==
Betts was the Saskatoon dealer for the Scripps-Booth car, and served as secretary of the Saskatoon Retail Merchants Association. He touted the Scripps-Booth as an energy efficient vehicle, and drove an 8-cylinder roadster. He was an enthusiast for fast cars and good roads, and was hired by the Saskatchewan Motor League as an organizer in winter 1916–17. He sought a co-ordinated effort by motorists to improve roads in Saskatchewan, mailed out letters to promote joining a motor league, and committed to making real progress within one year. He felt that by joining a motor league, vehicle owners would have strength in numbers and protect their investment. He wanted the province to assume maintenance of roads instead of the poor quality patchwork system kept by the municipalities.

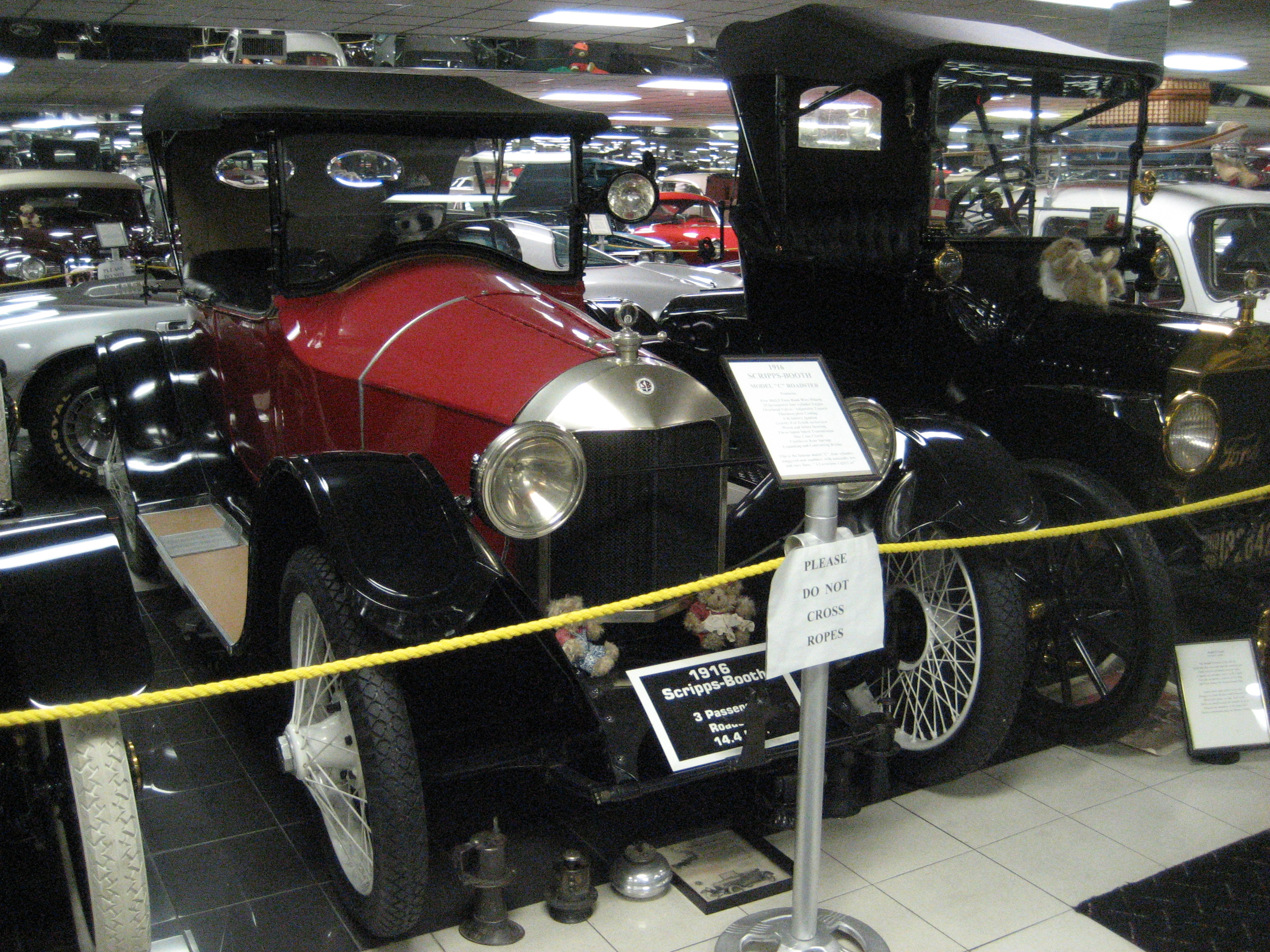
1916 Scripps-Booth Model C Roadster

In less than one year by July 1917, Betts had organized the establishment of 37 automobile clubs in Northern Saskatchewan. He lobbied the provincial government for a better highway network between its borders with Manitoba and Alberta, and succeeded in having uniform traffic signs and mileposts installed in Saskatchewan. He arranged an inter-provincial motor league convention in February 1918 and invited delegates from Manitoba and Alberta to work together for better roads. He co-operated with the Manitoba Motor League to install signage on major routes between Saskatchewan and Manitoba in 1918.

Betts assumed organizing duties for the southern half of the Saskatchewan Motor League in April 1919, and opened an office in Regina in addition to Saskatoon. He wanted more vehicle owners to install dimmers on headlights, and advocated for enforcement of no-glare laws for driving at night. At the annual convention, he urged for local trail blazing associations to take advantage of government grants for signage, and continued input from members to pressure the government for regular improvements to the road network. He sought to increase membership in the motor leagues to fight against the rising cost of vehicle licence fees, and convinced the provincial government to have a portion of the fees collected set aside for the annual maintenance of roads in Saskatchewan.

Betts's success in Saskatchewan led to him being contracted to organize clubs for the Alberta Motor League, to improve roads for the farmers, commercial travellers and tourists. He began working in Alberta while speaking at the Calgary Auto Club annual meeting in February 1920, and spent his winter vacation working from the Palliser Hotel in Calgary to complete the organization of the Alberta Motor League for 1921.

The Saskatchewan Motor League had been the most active provincial league in Canada under Betts's organization until it broke down due to internal politics. The Northern Saskatchewan Motor League was organized in February 1925, with Betts named to its board of governors to continue improving arterial roads and signage in Northern Saskatchewan.

== Later life and retirement ==
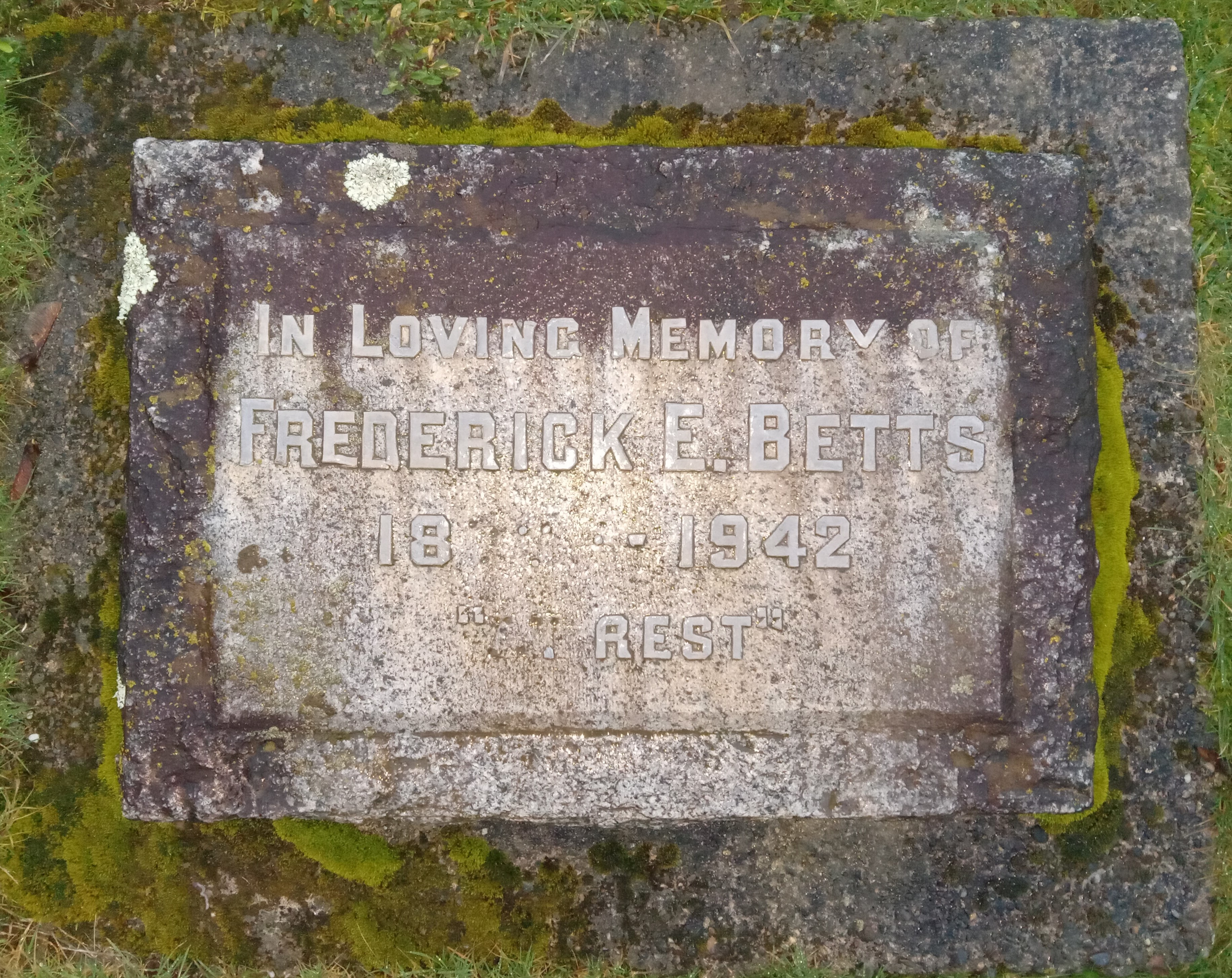
Betts's grave marker

Betts was the secretary-treasurer of the Saskatoon Lawn Bowling Club during the early 1920s, and played in doubles competitions in the Saskatchewan Lawn Bowling Association. He also played as a goaltender in a local broomball league, and was an officer of the Saskatoon Elks of Canada Lodge.

Betts was president of the Saskatoon Kennel Club from 1926 to 1927, and grew the club's annual dog show to become a prominent part of the Saskatoon Exhibition by including international judges. He supported the use of dogs to protect personal property, and led opposition to a proposed city by-law which would have allowed for the destruction of dogs that bit or attempted to bite anyone. He was named an associate director of the Saskatoon Exhibition in June 1927, and was the manager of the Winter Fair Building which included an ice rink for the 1930–31 season.

The CAHA awarded Betts a medal as its past president in 1925. When the CAHA held its silver jubilee and invited all past presidents as guests of honour in April 1939, Betts was unable to attend due to illness.

Betts moved from Saskatoon to Chilliwack, British Columbia, in July 1939, and was confined to bed following a stroke in January 1942. He died at home on February 23, 1942, and was interred in the Independent Order of Odd Fellows Cemetery in Chilliwack.
