= DriveNow =

One-way carsharing service in Europe

- Company type: Private (GmbH & Co. KG)
- Industry: Car rental
- Founded: June 2011
- Defunct: 2019
- Fate: Merged with car2go
- Successor: Share Now
- Headquarters: Munich, Germany
- Services: Carsharing
- Parent: BMW
- Website: www.drive-now.com

DriveNow was a one-way carsharing service wholly owned by the automotive manufacturer BMW. In 2019, DriveNow and car2go, a carsharing service from Daimler AG, merged to form the global mobility provider Share Now, with a combined fleet of 20,000 vehicles in 31 cities in 14 countries and over four million members worldwide. Share Now is one of the five mobility services which are part of the mobility joint venture of the BMW Group and the Daimler AG.

DriveNow service began in Munich, Germany in June 2011. As of October 2017, DriveNow operated over 6,000 vehicles in nine European countries. Apart from five cities in Germany - Berlin, Hamburg, Munich, Düsseldorf, and Cologne - DriveNow is available in Vienna, Copenhagen, Brussels, Milan, Helsinki and Lisbon. In October 2017, the company reached the milestone of one million customers.

DriveNow operated a fleet comprising only vehicles manufactured by subsidiaries of BMW Group including various MINI models (3 and 5 door, Convertible, Clubman, Countryman) as well as BMW X1, X2, i3, 1 series, and 2 series.

Created as a joint venture between BMW Group and the car rental company Sixt SE holding 50% of shares each, DriveNow became a wholly owned subsidiary of BMW in March 2018. On 29 January 2018, BMW announced that Sixt SE had agreed to sell its 50% stake for c. €209 million. In April 2018, BMW Group and Daimler AG agreed to combine their mobility services, including their car sharing devices DriveNow and car2go, to shape sustainable urban mobility for the future.

A similar BMW service, ReachNow, was offered in North American cities from April 2016 to July 2019, in Seattle, Washington, Portland, Oregon and Brooklyn, New York. In contrast to DriveNow, ReachNow's technology platform was provided by RideCell rather than Sixt.

== Operation ==
=== Cities ===
The following table details all cities where DriveNow operated:

City	Country	Vehicles	Type	Start date	End date	Ref.
Munich	Germany	750	Gasoline, Diesel, Electric	June 2011		
Berlin	Germany	1400	Gasoline, Diesel, Electric	September 2011		
Hamburg	Germany	620	Gasoline, Diesel, Electric	October 2013		
Düsseldorf	Germany	310	Gasoline, Diesel, Electric	January 2012		
Cologne	Germany	310	Gasoline, Diesel, Electric	September 2012		
Vienna	Austria	720	Gasoline, Diesel, Electric	October 2014		
London	United Kingdom	720	Gasoline, Diesel, Electric	December 2014	29 February 2020	
Copenhagen	Denmark	550	Gasoline, Electric	September 2015		
Stockholm	Sweden	400	Gasoline, Diesel, Electric	October 2015	31 October 2018	
Brussels	Belgium	310	Gasoline, Electric	July 2016	29 February 2020	
Milan	Italy	500	Gasoline, Electric	October 2016		
Helsinki	Finland	150	Gasoline, Electric	May 2017	29 February 2020	
Lisbon	Portugal	210	Gasoline, Diesel, Electric	September 2017	3 March 2020	
Budapest	Hungary	250	Gasoline, Diesel, Electric	May 2019		

=== One-way car sharing model ===
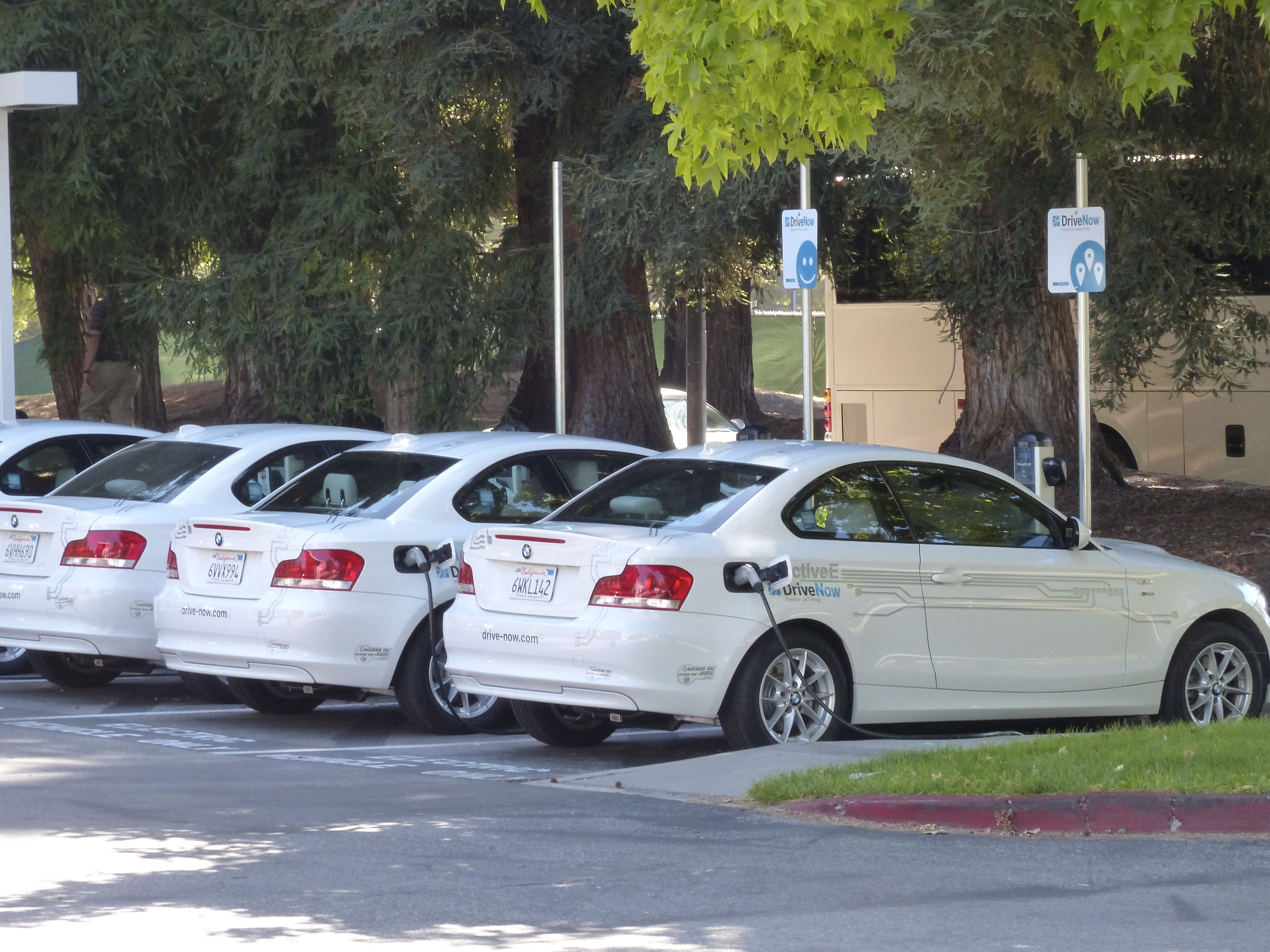
Several BMW ActiveE in service for DriveNow charging at Googleplex in Mountain View, California

In contrast to classic car rental, where a vehicle is rented at a designated location and typically returned after one or more days, one-way carsharing models allows the use of freely parked vehicles in the city area, or business area. Vehicles can be found and rented through an app on the phone. Driving charge is by a minute rate that ranges between €0.24 to €0.57 per minute depending on the vehicle and business area. The price includes fuel, parking, and insurance. DriveNow also offers packages to make the per minute rate cheaper. Vehicles can be parked back anywhere in the business area of the city. Typically, the car must be parked in the same city as it was rented. The exception is in Düsseldorf and Cologne.

=== App ===
An app for mobile devices allow users to locate and reserve vehicles. When reserving a car online, the customers are able to see the car's fuel gauge (gasoline-powered cars) or the battery's state of charge (electric-powered cars), so if the customer wants to go for an extended drive, they can find the right car for that trip. Cars can also be opened and closed through the app.

== Vehicles ==
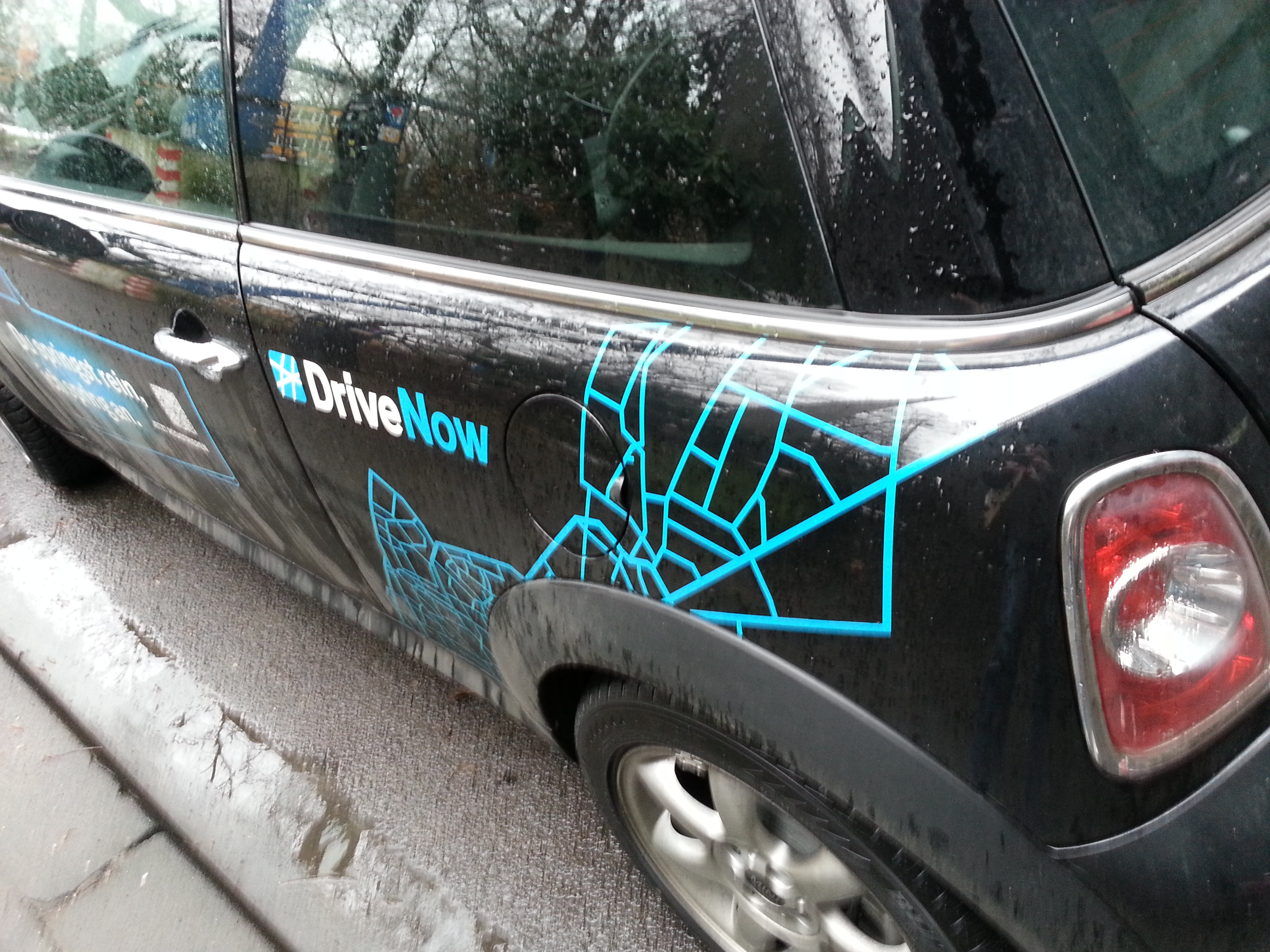
DriveNow Car Sharing Mini Cooper

DriveNow operates a variety of gasoline-powered and diesel BMW 1 Series, BMW 2 Series, BMW X2 series, BMW X1, Mini Countryman, Mini Clubman, Mini Convertible and Mini Cooper vehicles as well the electric-powered BMW i3 and BMW ActiveE. In the San Francisco Bay Area, DriveNow deployed a fleet of 70 BMW ActiveE electric cars by July 2015.

=== Electric driving ===
DriveNow Electric Driving with BMW i3 DriveNow once claimed to offer the largest electric car sharing fleet in the world, using BMW i3, BMW i3 Rex, and BMW Active E. Since 15 July 2015, a total of 724 full-electric BMW i3s have been in regular operation in the fleets of Berlin (130 vehicles), Hamburg, Cologne / Düsseldorf and Munich. The BMW ActiveE in Berlin and Munich were thus replaced. In London, DriveNow offered the BMW i3 from May 2015 till closure and could thus benefit from tax relief. In Copenhagen, DriveNow launched a purely electric fleet of 400 vehicles in September 2015.
