= 1920 Allan Cup =

Canadian senior ice hockey championship

The Allan Cup was the championship trophy for amateur senior ice hockey overseen by the CAHA.

The 1920 Allan Cup was the senior ice hockey championship of the Canadian Amateur Hockey Association (CAHA) for the 1919–20 season.

== History ==
During the 1920 Allan Cup playoffs, CAHA president Frederick E. Betts expressed concerns that the Toronto Varsity Blues men's ice hockey team had violated the rules by participating in both the Ontario Hockey Association and the Canadian Interuniversity Athletics Union playoffs. At the 1920 general meeting, the CAHA decided that the team was eligible for the Allan Cup. Betts and Allan Cup trustee William Northey formed a committee to discuss the CAHA having more say into how the Allan Cup playoffs were operated. Betts sought to end the financial struggles of operating the CAHA and to receive adequate financial compensation. He argued that the Allan Cup playoffs were the primary source of income for the CAHA, and that the lack of working capital made it difficult to have meetings and govern effectively. He sought a provision that gave a set percentage of gate receipts to the CAHA annually, as opposed to funds being distributed solely at the discretion of the cup's trustees.

== Final ==
The Winnipeg Falcons defeated the Toronto Varsity Blues men's ice hockey team by 11 goals to 5 in a two-game total goals series. The Falcons then represented the Canada men's national ice hockey team in ice hockey at the 1920 Summer Olympics, and won the first Olympic gold medal in ice hockey.

- Winnipeg Falcons 8 University of Toronto 3
- Winnipeg Falcons 3 University of Toronto 2
