= Grain Exchange Building =

The Grain Exchange Building
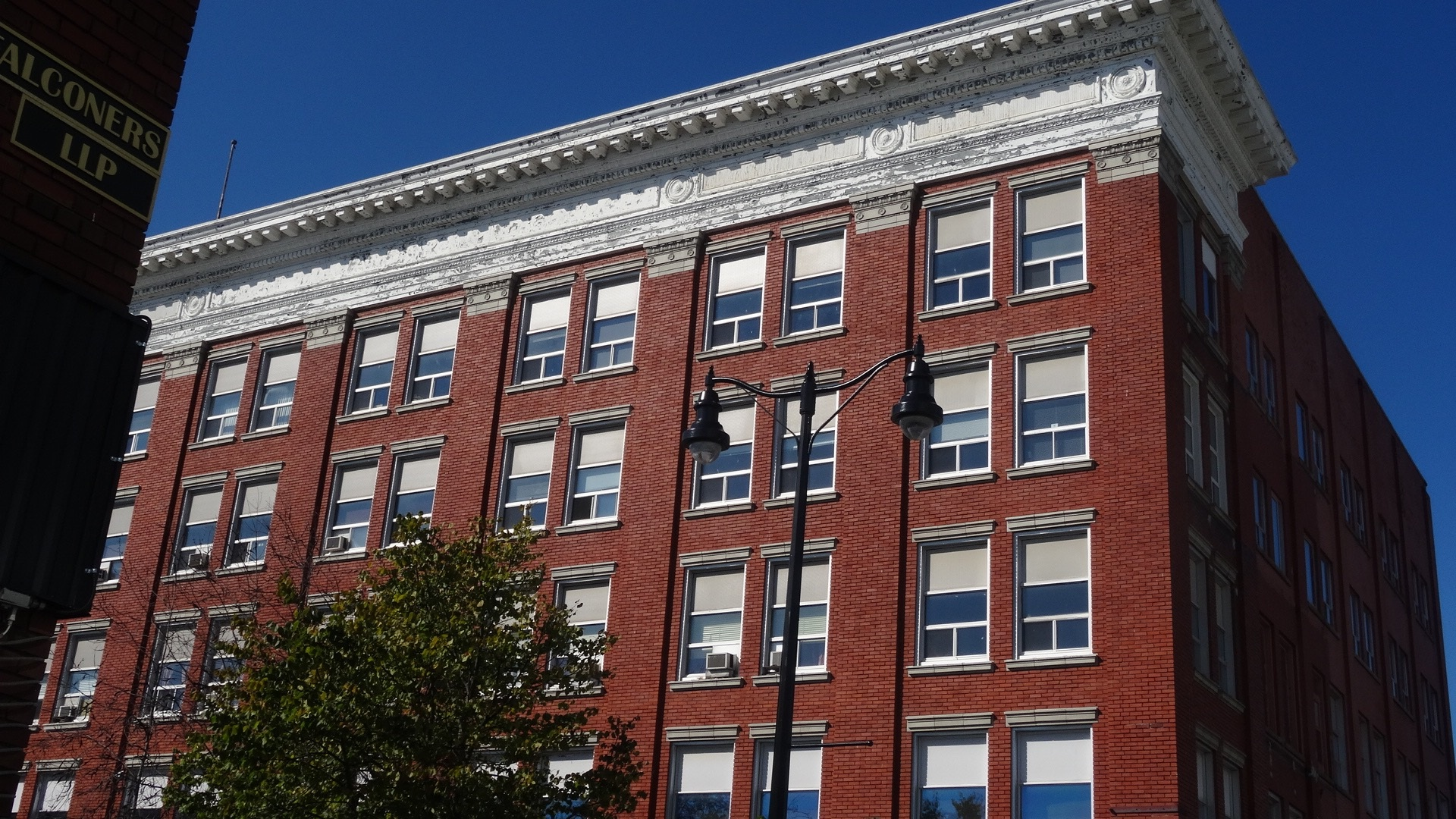
- The Grain Exchange Building
- Interactive map of the The Grain Exchange Building area

General information
- Architectural style: Edwardian
- Location: Thunder Bay, Ontario 701 Victoria avenue
- Coordinates: 48°23′03.8″N 89°14′53.0″W
- Completed: 1909; 117 years ago

Technical details
- Floor count: 5

Design and construction
- Architect: Carl Wirth

The Grain Exchange Building is a historic building located at 701 Victoria Avenue East in the south side downtown area of Thunder Bay, Ontario, Canada.

== History ==
The Grain Exchange Building was constructed in 1909, and designed by the architect Carl Wirth. Commonly known as the Chapples building because its major occupant from 1913 to 1981 was the department store run by the Chapples family, this building is more properly known as the Grain Exchange Building. It was constructed for Fort William’s attempt to capture the grain exchange business from Winnipeg, but the venture never really got off the ground. For years the building has housed a variety of offices. The construction of Victoriaville Civic Centre, which opened in 1980, enclosed much of the building within a mall. The decision was made in October of 2020 to demolish the aging Victoriaville Mall and return the area to a street. Demolition started in August 2025.
