= Share Now =

German carsharing company

Share Now GmbH
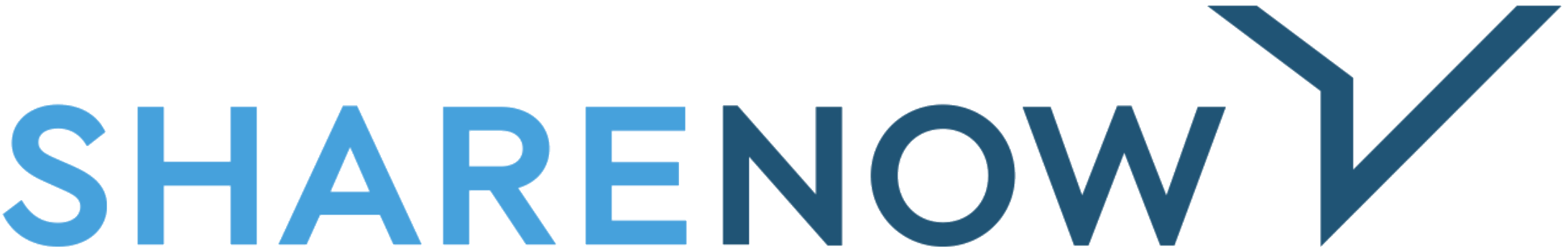
- Type: Subsidiary
- Industry: Car rental
- Predecessors: Car2Go; DriveNow
- Founded: 2019; 7 years ago
- Defunct: 2024; 2 years ago
- Headquarters: Berlin, Germany
- Number of locations: 16
- Services: Carsharing
- Owner: Stellantis
- Parent: Free2Move

Share Now GmbH was a German carsharing company, formed from the merger of Car2Go and DriveNow. From 2022, it was a subsidiary of the Free2Move division of multinational automaker Stellantis providing carsharing services in urban areas in Europe, and formerly in North America. It had over four million registered members and a fleet of over 14,000 vehicles in 18 cities across Europe.

The company offered only Smart, Mercedes-Benz, BMW, Mini, Fiat and Citroën vehicles during the period when it was jointly owned by BMW and Mercedes-Benz and arranged one-way point-to-point rentals. Users were charged by the minute, or by hourly and daily rates. A smartphone app was used to enable hirers to access the vehicle.

Stellantis acquired ShareNow in July 2022 via its Free2Move subsidiary. The company is gradually integrated until April 2024 into Free2Move.

== History ==
Daimler introduced the service in Ulm, Germany, in October 2008, where it was developed by one of its internal business innovation units and was first tested exclusively by Daimler employees.

Starting in May 2015, car2go added a $1 'Driver Protection Fee' for each ride to offset the lowered deductible.

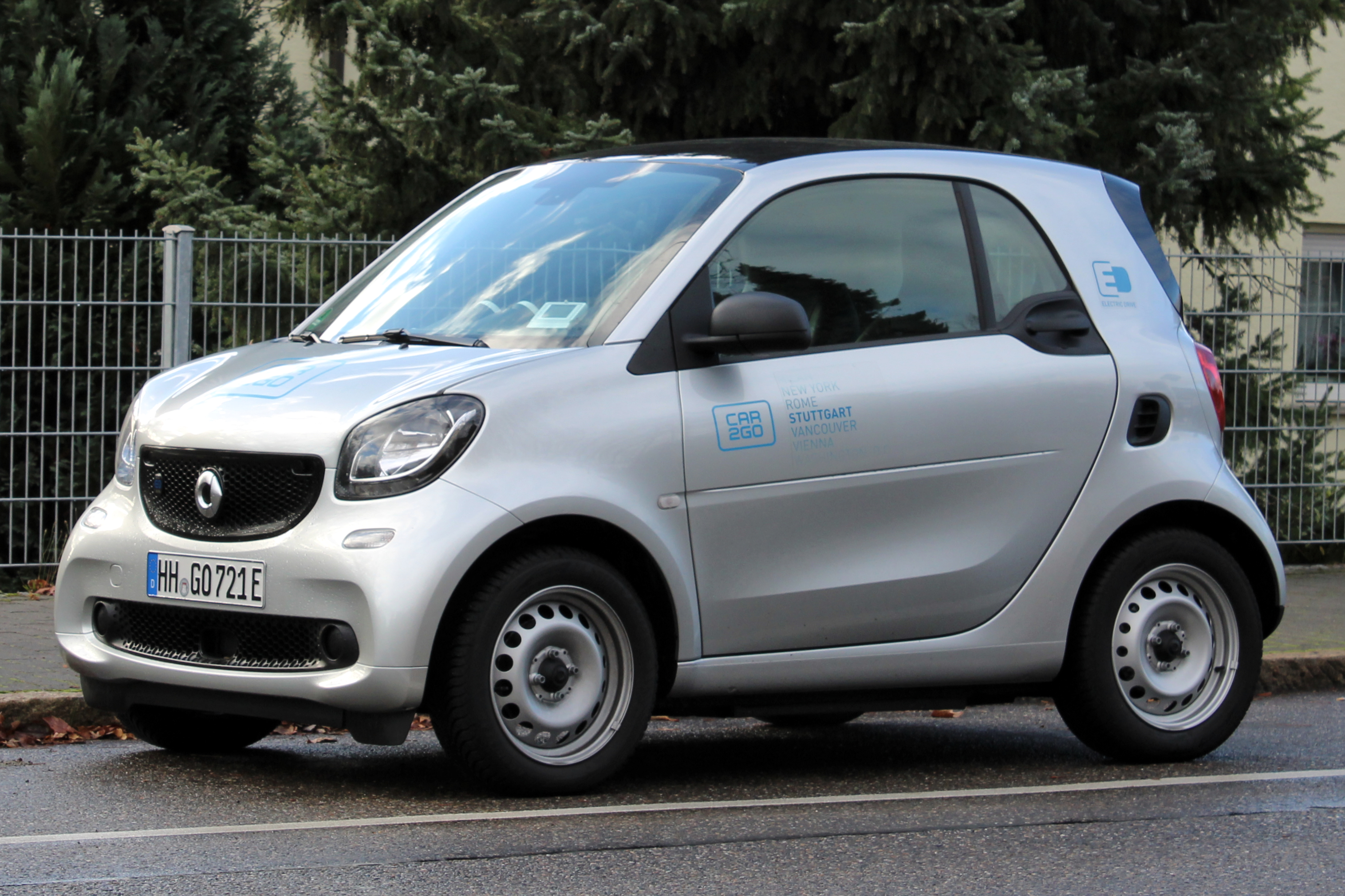
car2go car in Stuttgart

Since inception, car2go withdrew from several locations, including Britain, where it closed its service in London and Birmingham after only a year of operation. Because of a lack of charging stations, car2go in San Diego, California, replaced its all-electric vehicle fleet with gasoline-powered cars starting on 1 May 2016. When the service started in 2011, car2go expected 1,000 charging stations to be deployed around the city, but only 400 were in place by early 2016. As a result, an average of 20% of the carsharing fleet is unavailable at any given time because the cars are either being charged or do not have enough charge to be driven. At the end of 2016 car2go left the San Diego market.

In January 2018, Daimler and BMW appeared to prepare the merger of their carsharing subsidiaries to strengthen their market position. On March 1, 2018, Daimler announced that its subsidiary Daimler Mobility Services had acquired the 25% stake of minority shareholder Europcar Group for an undisclosed amount to now hold 100% of car2go's European subsidiary. The new combined company is called ShareNow.

=== Downsizing ===
In late 2019, the company announced that it would close all North American operations (New York City NY, Seattle WA, Denver CO, Austin TX, and Washington DC in the United States; Montreal QC, and Vancouver BC in Canada) on 29 February 2020 because of excessive competition, increasing costs of operation and its limited infrastructure for supporting electric vehicles. Service in London, Brussels and Florence would also cease because of inadequate usage. That would leave ShareNow with operations in 18 cities in Europe, locations that "show the greatest potential for profitable growth and mobility innovation", according to the company.

=== Acquired by Stellantis ===
On 3 May 2022, the acquisition of Share Now by the automobile manufacturer Stellantis was announced. The acquisition was closed on 18 July 2022 and Stellantis subsidiary Free2Move handles the Share Now ownership.

== Locations ==
=== Current ===
The following table details all locations where ShareNow is active:

indicates electric fleet

City	Country	Fleet	Start date
Amsterdam	Netherlands	300	Nov 2011
Berlin	Germany	1,800	April 2012
Copenhagen	Denmark	500	Sep 2015
Düsseldorf/Cologne	Germany	1,100	Jan 2012
Frankfurt	Germany	300	Sep 2014
Hamburg	Germany	1,100	April 2011
Madrid	Spain	600	Nov 2015
Milan	Italy	1,400	Aug 2013
Munich	Germany	1,000	June 2013
Münster	Germany		
Paris	France	700	Jan 2019
Rome	Italy	600	Mar 2014
Stuttgart	Germany	350	Nov 2012
Turin	Italy	350	Mar 2015
Vienna	Austria	1,000	Dec 2011

=== Former ===
The following table details all locations where Share Now is no longer active as of July 2019:

City/ Municipality	Country	Start date	End date	Reference
Ulm	Germany	October 2008	December 2014	
Lyon	France	February 2012	June 2012	
London	United Kingdom	December 2012	May 2014	
Birmingham	United Kingdom	May 2013	May 2014	
South Bay, Los Angeles	United States	June 2014	June 2015	
Eugene, Oregon	United States	October 2014	June 2015	
Copenhagen	Denmark	September 2014	January 2016	
Miami	United States	July 2012	February 2016	
Stockholm	Sweden	November 2014	September 2016	
Minneapolis–Saint Paul	United States	September 2013	December 2016	
San Diego	United States	November 2011	December 2016	
Toronto	Canada	June 2012	June 2018	
Columbus	United States	October 2013	June 2018	
Chongqing	China	April 2016	June 2019	
Austin	United States	May 2010	October 2019	
Calgary	Canada	July 2012	October 2019	
Denver	United States	June 2013	October 2019	
Portland, Oregon	United States	Mar 2012	October 2019	
Chicago	United States	Jul 2018	December 2019	
Vancouver	Canada	Jun 2011	February 2020	
Washington, D.C.	United States	Mar 2012	February 2020	
Seattle	United States	Dec 2012	February 2020	
Montreal	Canada	Nov 2013	February 2020	
Florence	Italy	Jun 2014	February 2020	
New York City	United States	Oct 2014	February 2020	
Helsinki	Finland	May 2017	March 2020	
Lisbon	Portugal	Sep 2017	March 2020	
Budapest	Hungary	April 2019	October 2023	

=== Fleet ===
The following models are active in the ShareNow fleet. The selection of available vehicles varies depending on the location.

- BMW: 1 Series, 2 series, 2 Series Active Tourer, i3, X1, X2
- Citroën: C3
- Fiat: 500, New 500, 500x
- Hyundai: Ioniq 5
- Mercedes-Benz: A-Class, CLA Coupe, CLA Shootingbrake, E-Class, GLA, GLB, GLC Coupé
- MINI: Cooper, Countryman, Clubman
- Opel: Corsa, Astra, Crossland
- Peugeot: 208, 2008, 308, 3008
- Renault: ZOE
- Škoda: Octavia
- smart: fortwo, fortwo EQ, forfour

== Business model ==
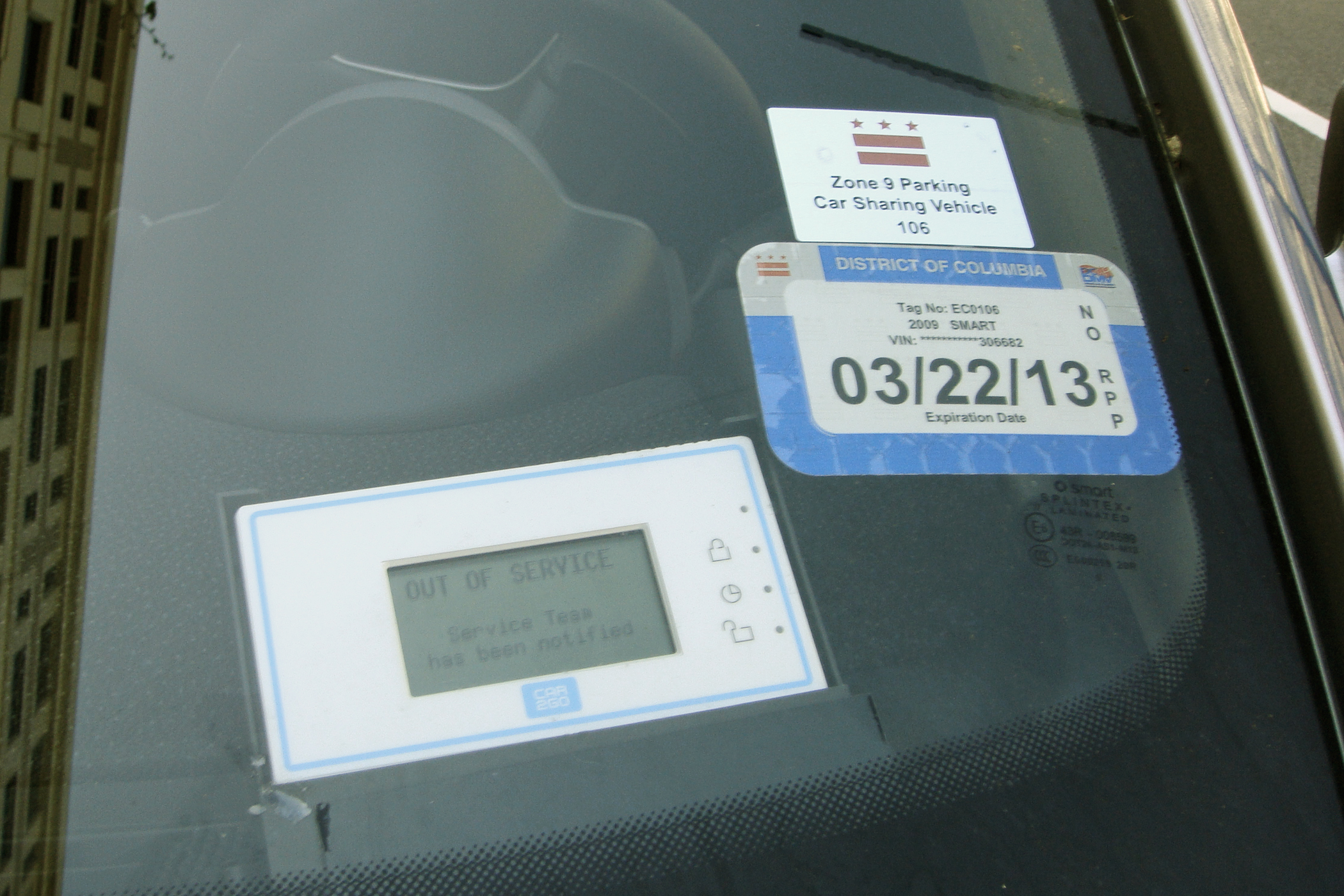
car2go member card reader that allows access to the vehicle

The Share Now business model was similar in all markets, although rates vary by location. The company charges a per minute rate, with discounted fixed rates for hourly and daily usage also available and applied automatically. The rates are all-inclusive and cover rental, gas, insurance, parking (in authorized areas), and maintenance, a low fixed annual fee is sometimes also charged. In most markets, Share Now vehicles can be parked in either specially designated parking spots, or in standard parking areas, with a special permit from the local municipality. Users had the option of refueling cars with a supplied charge card, customers receive bonus minutes for performing this service.

=== Vehicles ===
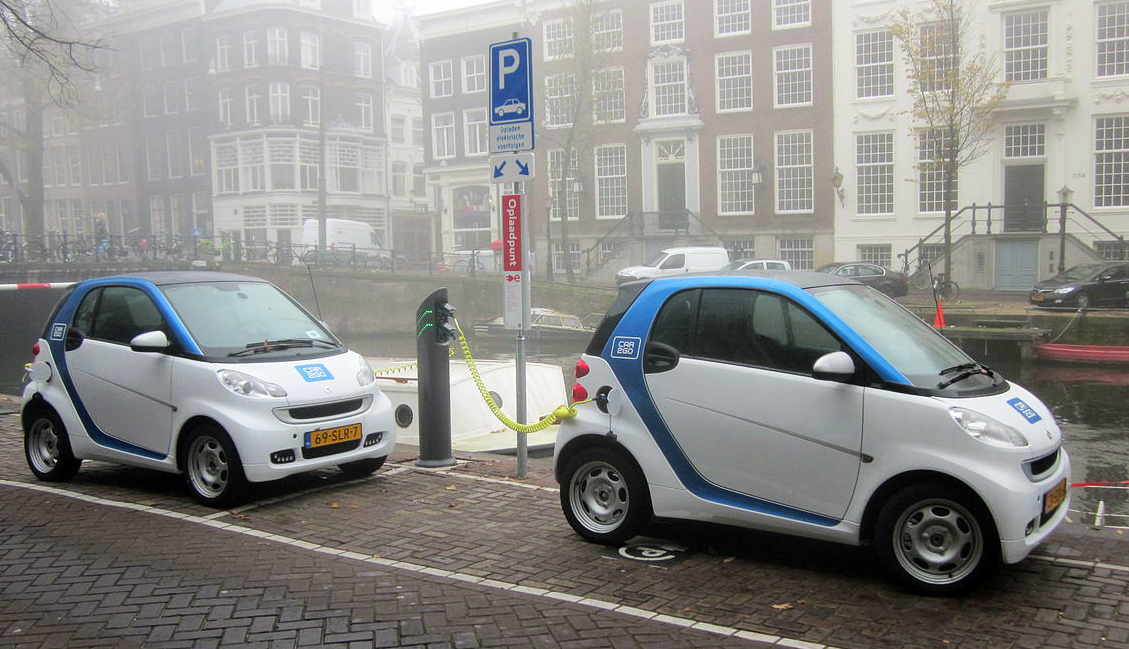
Two car2go Smart electric drive cars charging at the Herengracht in Amsterdam

In most cities, Share Now offered only two-passenger vehicles, namely two types of Smart Fortwo "car2go edition" vehicles: gasoline-powered, and electric-powered. The gasoline-powered cars can be found in three variants based on roof configuration: "original" with integrated solar panel roof; "upgraded" with a panoramic polycarbonate roof and power side mirrors; and "new" featuring a standard roof. Electric Share Now models were currently available in several markets, had a range of 84 miles (135 km), and needed to be recharged every two or three days.

=== Apps ===
First-party and third-party apps for mobile devices allowed users to locate and reserve vehicles. When reserving a car online, the customers are able to see the car's fuel gauge (gasoline-powered cars) or the battery's state of charge (electric-powered cars), so if the customer wants to go for an extended drive, they can find the right car for that trip.

== See also ==
- Carsharing
- One-way carsharing
- Evo Car Share
- GIG Car Share
- Zipcar
