= Gig Car Share =

GIG Car Share
- Company type: Subsidiary
- Founded: April 30, 2017
- Defunct: December 5, 2024
- Area served: Oakland, Berkeley, Sacramento, Albany, Alameda, and Seattle
- Services: Carsharing
- Parent: A3 Ventures
- Website: gigcarshare.com

GIG Car Share was a carsharing service in parts of the San Francisco Bay Area, Sacramento, and Seattle, created by "A3 Ventures" (a division of the American Automobile Association). The company operates a fleet of Toyota Prius Hybrid vehicles and all-electric Chevrolet Bolts. It offers one-way point-to-point rentals. The service concluded operations in the San Francisco Bay Area and Seattle on Thursday December 5, 2024.

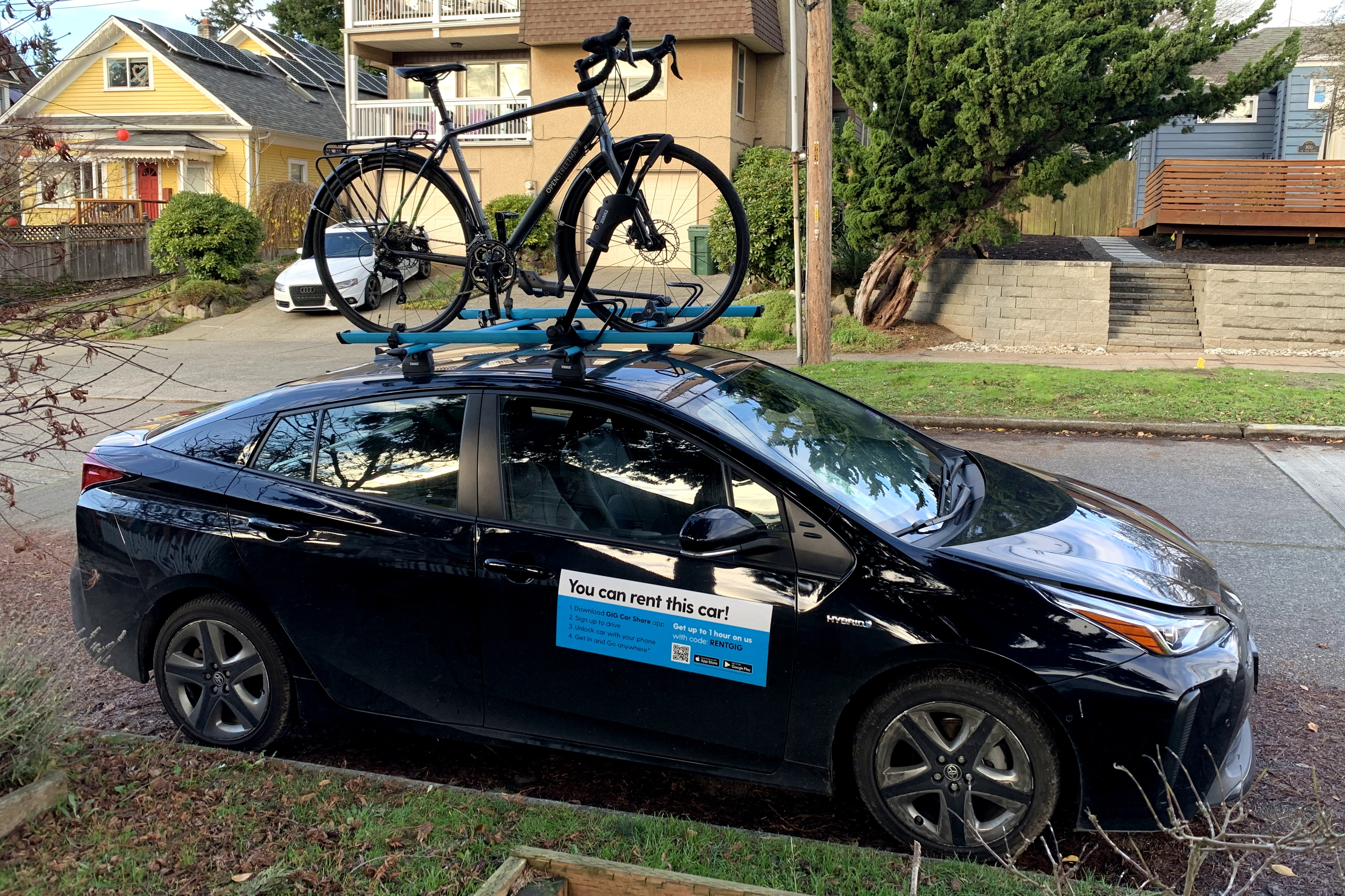
GIG Car Share 2020 Toyota Prius XLE parked with a bicycle on its roof rack in Seattle

The cars are unlocked and locked using a near-field communication (NFC) card or the companion app. Users can be charged different rates depending on the plan chosen. Plans include being charged by the minute, hour, and day.

The company collaborates with cities to pay for parking (including metered spots), which is included in each reservation.

At launch, in April 2017, the company's fleet consisted of 250 vehicles across Berkeley and Oakland. Between November 23, 2017, and December 31, 2017, the company temporarily expanded its service zone to include the San Francisco International Airport to accommodate holiday travelers. On January 29, 2018, GIG announced an expansion from 250 to 500 vehicles. In 2018, GIG expanded to Albany and Alameda. In May 2019 GIG launched the largest all-electric car-sharing fleet in the United States, with 260 Chevy Bolts in Sacramento.

GIG also operates several designated parking lots in San Francisco, and one at the Oakland International Airport.

As of May 2019, Gig launched the nation's first inter-regional one-way car-sharing service, allowing members to start a trip in either the East Bay or Sacramento and end their trip in a different region.

In April 2020, the service expanded to Seattle, intending to deploy a fleet of 250 hybrid cars by May.

In February 2023, the company announced they would be phasing out their service in Sacramento, citing "Insufficient demand and high operational costs."

In July 2024, the company announced they would be shutting down the service altogether on December 27th, 2024 citing "challenges due to decreased demand, rising operational costs, and changes in consumer commuting patterns."
