= Shared transport =

Demand-driven and vehicle-sharing arrangement

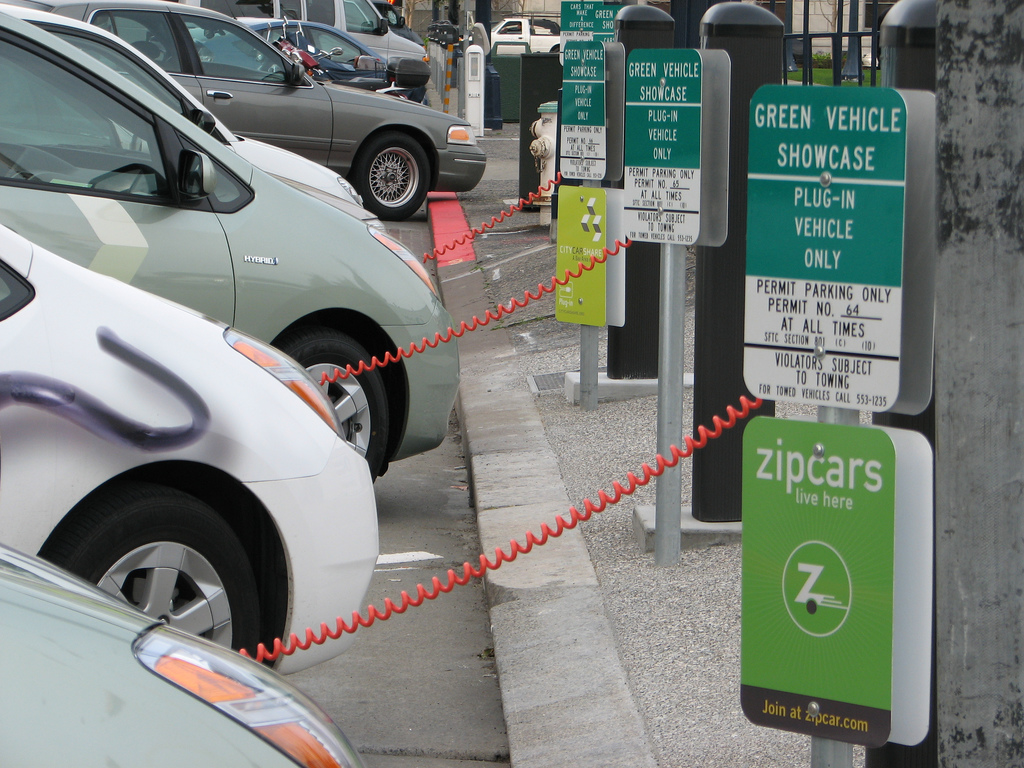
Zipcar Charging Station in San Francisco, California

Shared transport or shared mobility is a transportation system where travelers share a vehicle either simultaneously as a group (e.g. ride-sharing) or over time (e.g. carsharing or bike sharing) as personal rental, and in the process share the cost of the journey. It is a transportation strategy that allows users to access transportation services on an as-needed basis, and can be regarded as a hybrid between private vehicle use and mass or public transport. Shared mobility is an umbrella term that encompasses a variety of transportation modes including carsharing, Bicycle-sharing systems, ridesharing companies, carpools, and microtransit.

Each shared mobility service has unique attributes that have a range of impacts on travel behavior, the environment, and the development of cities and urban areas. Some impacts of shared mobility include enhanced transportation accessibility as well as reduced driving and decreased personal vehicle ownership. Shared mobility programs often yield a variety of environmental, social, and transportation system benefits. These are primarily related to personal vehicle usage and ownership, and vehicle miles or kilometers traveled (VMT/VKT). Shared mobility networks also retain the potential to expand the reach of public transportation by addressing gaps in existing public transportation systems. They can also provide economic benefits to users in the form of cost savings in some cases.

Shared transport systems include carsharing (also called car clubs in the UK), bicycle sharing (also known as PBS or public bicycle systems), carpools and vanpools (aka ride-sharing or lift-sharing), real-time ridesharing, slugging (casual carpooling), community buses and vans, demand responsive transit (DRT), paratransit, a range of taxi projects and even hitchhiking and its numerous variants.

Shared transport is taking on increasing importance as a key strategy for reducing greenhouse gas and other emissions from the transport sector in the face of the global climate emergency by finding ways of getting more intensive use of vehicles on the road. Together with other emerging automotive technologies such as vehicle electrification, connected vehicles and autonomous driving, shared transports form a future mobility vision called Connected, Autonomous, Shared and Electric (CASE) Mobility.

A somewhat different form of shared transport is the "shared taxi", a vehicle which follows a predetermined route and takes anybody waiting for it, more like a bus than a taxi.

== History ==
Shared mobility is a subgroup of the larger sharing economy. The sharing economy is a term that encompasses a wide variety of services, usually involving the online transactions of goods or services as part of a peer-to-peer marketplace. Innovations in social networking, location-based services, and Internet technologies have enabled shared mobility to develop and expand rapidly. By improving efficiency, providing cost savings, and monetizing underused resources, shared mobility services have become widely used in many cities around the world. Although the proliferation of tech-enabled shared mobility has occurred mostly within the last decade, shared mobility services are not a new phenomenon. The first carsharing program was established in 1948 in Zurich, Switzerland, and the first bikesharing program began in 1965 in Amsterdam, Netherlands.

Smartphone applications and location data have increased the feasibility of shared transportation services, including carsharing companies and mobile app-based vehicle for hire companies.

== Auto rickshaws ==
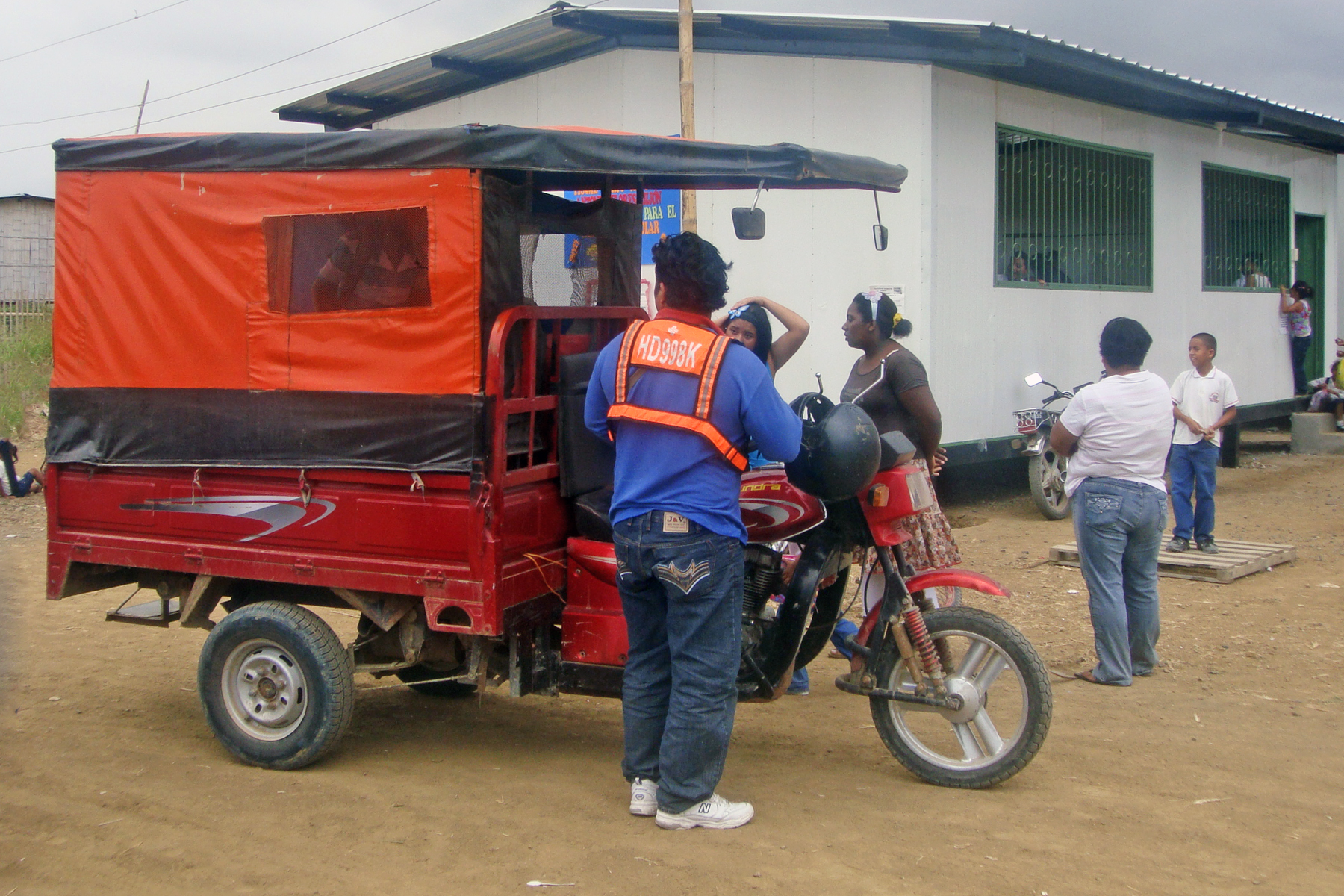
Auto rickshaw in Guayaquil, Ecuador

Auto rickshaws carry people and goods in many developing countries. Also known as a three-wheeler, Samosa, tempo, tuk-tuk, trishaw, auto, rickshaw, autorick, bajaj, rick, tricycle, mototaxi, baby taxi or lapa in popular parlance, they are motorized version of the traditional pulled rickshaw or cycle rickshaw. They are an essential form of urban transport, both as vehicles for hire and for private use, in many developing countries, and a form of novelty transport in many Eastern countries.

== Bikesharing ==
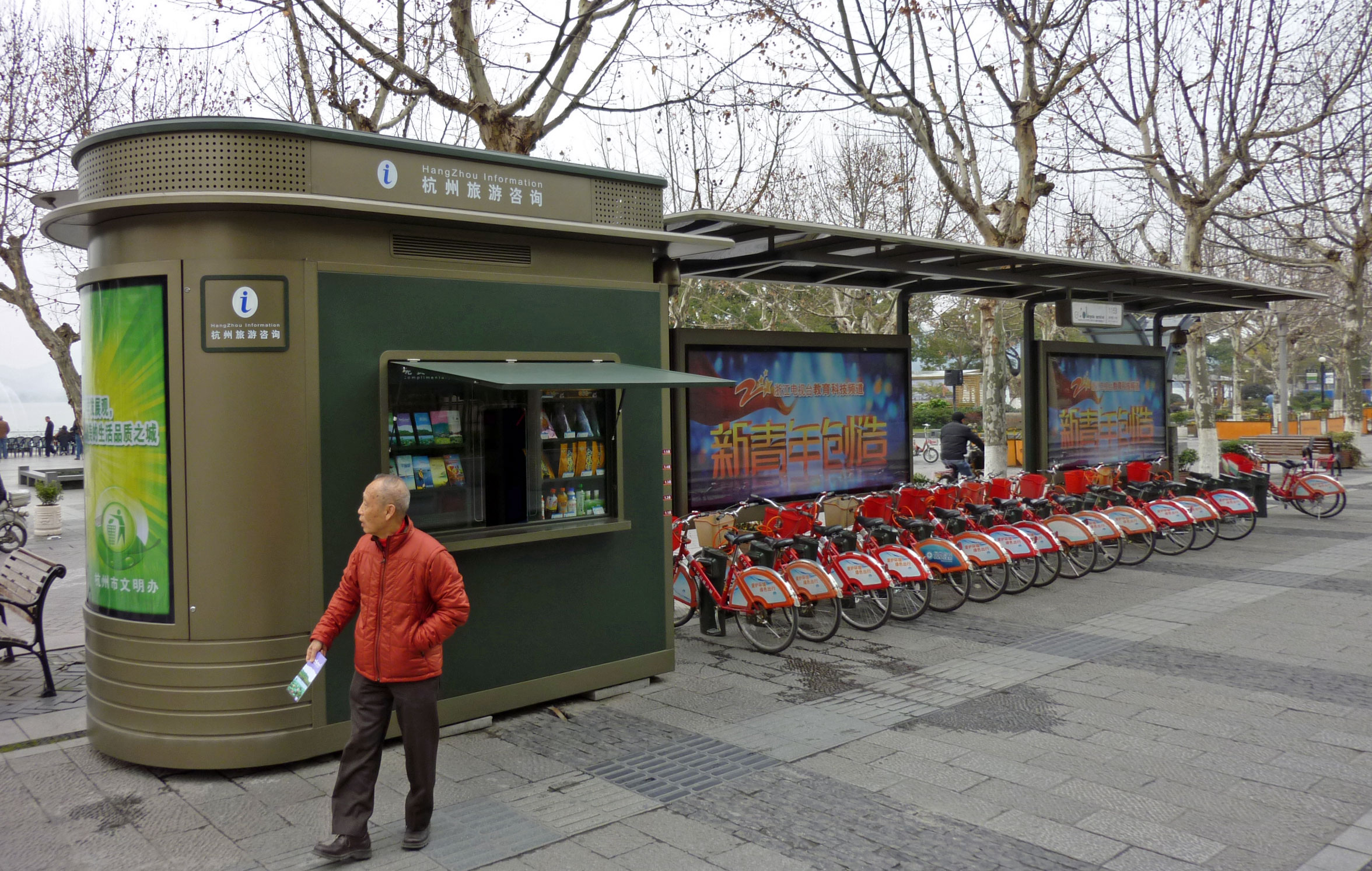
The Hangzhou Public Bicycle system in China, the largest bicycle sharing system in the world

Bicycle-sharing systems allow users to access and use a shared fleet of bicycles, typically located within a given spatial boundary. These systems are mostly concentrated in cities or other urban areas and bikes or stations are normally unattended and always accessible. This availability during most or all of the day makes bikesharing an on-demand mobility option.

The first bikesharing system debuted in Amsterdam in 1965, under the name ‘White Bikes.’ The bicycles were left unlocked around the city to be used by anyone in need of transportation. Bikesharing systems have since exploded in popularity starting in the mid-2000s due to advances in information technology (IT) that have improved bikesharing communications and tracking. As of April 2016, there were 99 U.S. cities with technology-enabled public bikesharing systems, with approximately 32,200 bikes and 3,400 stations.

Three major types of bikesharing systems have emerged: public bikesharing (docked and dockless/free floating), closed campus bikesharing and peer-to-peer (P2P) bikesharing. Most bikesharing systems are public and allow anyone to access a bicycle for a fee, typically in daily, monthly or annual membership fees. Public bikesharing programs can be station-based (docked), or dockless (also known as free floating). Dockless systems are deployed within a geo-fenced area. Dockless systems were first introduced in Germany in the early 2000s via the Call a Bike program. Major bikesharing operators in North America include: Motivate, Social Bicycles, Spin, ofo, Mobike, and LimeBike. E-bikesharing systems (or Pedlec) have also been growing in popularity, particularly in Europe. Social Bicycles began testing an e-bikesharing program, called Jump, in San Francisco in Summer 2017. Studies have been conducted that analyze bikesharing impacts on modal shift. A 2014 UC Berkeley study suggests that in larger cities, bikesharing programs remove riders from crowded or high-use bus transit systems. In smaller cities, bikesharing improves access from bus lines, filling in gaps in the public transit system. In addition, those living in larger cities report decreased rail usage as a result of increased cost savings and reduced travel times. The study also found that half of the bikesharing members surveyed reduced their personal vehicle usage due to bikesharing.

== Carsharing ==
Carsharing refers to a model of vehicle sharing where users access cars on an as-needed basis, and often pay by time of reservation or miles driven. As of January 2015, there were 23 carsharing operators in the U.S. amounting to over 1.1 million members and over 16,000 vehicles. As of January 2017, there were 39 carsharing organizations in North America serving 1.9 million members with a collective fleet of 24,629 vehicles. (these numbers do not include P2P carsharing; they include roundtrip and one-way carsharing operations.).

=== Roundtrip carsharing ===
Roundtrip carsharing is one of the earliest carsharing models, granting members access to a shared vehicle fleet. As the name suggests, roundtrip carsharing requires users to return to the same location where they accessed the vehicle. One of the largest North American-based roundtrip carsharing operators is Zipcar, which operates more than 12,000 vehicles in urban areas on college campuses and at airports across the United States, Canada, the United Kingdom, Spain, France, Belgium, Turkey and Taiwan. There have been numerous studies that document behavioral changes associated with roundtrip carsharing programs. A 2004 study on City CarShare in San Francisco, CA found that nearly 30% of members reduced car ownership by one of more cars; two-thirds of members reported that they opted not to purchase an additional vehicle. This reduced car ownership typically translates into reduced driving, and thus lowered energy consumption and greenhouse gas emissions. Carsharing programs also affect usage patterns of other travel modes. A 2011 study by UC Berkeley researchers found that roundtrip carsharing has a mixed impact on public transit and non-motorized modal use, with the same proportion of respondents increasing and decreasing usage of these modes. The impact on carpooling and non-motorized transportation, however, was found to be positive. The same study documented a 27% to 43% reduction in vehicle miles traveled and a 34% to 41% reduction in greenhouse gas emissions among households due to roundtrip carsharing.

=== One-way carsharing ===
One-way carsharing varies from roundtrip carsharing in that it grants members more flexibility in pickup and dropoff location. In one-way carsharing—also known as point-to-point carsharing—members can access a vehicle at one location and end their trip in another location. As of September 2015, companies that offered one-way functionality in the U.S. include car2go, GIG, ReachNow, Zipcar, and BlueIndy. As of January 2015, about 35% of North American carsharing fleets were one-way capable. A 2016 study of one-way carsharing operator, car2go, in five North American cities found that 2% to 5% of members sold a vehicle, and 7% to 10% postponed a vehicle purchase due to their carsharing membership. Moreover, estimated VMT impacts due to carsharing ranged from −6% to −16% per car2go household, and GHG emissions changed by −4% to −18%.

=== Personal vehicle sharing (PVS) and P2P carsharing ===
Personal vehicle sharing (PVS) is a carsharing service model that allows short-term access to privately owned vehicles. P2P carsharing, a subset of PVS, employs privately owned vehicles made available for shared usage by members of a P2P member base. P2P carsharing companies differ from other carsharing operators in that users provide the free-floating vehicle fleet using their personally owned vehicles. P2P carsharing operators in North America include Getaround and Turo (formerly RelayRides), and as of May 2015, there were eight active P2P operators in North America. One 2014 study found that the top three reasons for using P2P carsharing are convenience and availability, monetary savings, and expanded mobility options. Another study documented that personal vehicle sharing services can expand the geographic range of vehicle sharing services by renting underused autos and therefore lowering vehicle usage requirements. However, fear of sharing personal assets was cited as one of the primary barriers to the adoption of P2P sharing services.

== Ridesharing ==
Ridesharing services enable shared rides between drivers and passengers that have similar origins and destination pairings. Ridesharing includes both vanpooling and carpooling. Vanpooling involves a grouping of between seven and 15 people traveling in a van, and carpooling refers to groups of less than seven people traveling together in one vehicle. Ridesharing is distinct from ridesourcing (or TNCs), like Uber and Lyft in that the driver typically decides trip origin, destination, and any deviations to accommodate one or more additional passengers. Drivers and riders have the same origin, destination, or potentially share multiple proximate destinations, with a common purpose of conserving resources, saving money, or saving time. Driver earnings from ridesharing are regulated in the U.S. by the Internal Revenue Service, and as of January 2017, they were capped at 53.5 cents per mile for business travel by car. Both technology-enabled ridesharing organizations and more informal ridesharing programs exist. Examples of technology-enabled ridesharing companies are BlaBlaCar, Carma Carpool, Scoop, and Waze Carpool. These services usually require participants to join either through a membership, website, or mobile application. Potential drivers and riders can then post driving routes or preferred travel routes and the ridesharing service will connect riders with passengers that share similar origin destination pairings. More informal ad hoc ridesharing programs include slugging (also known as casual carpooling). Casual carpooling is an informal form of commuter ridesharing operating in Washington, D.C.; Houston, Texas; and San Francisco, California. Casual carpooling has been in existence for over 30 years, is entirely run informally by its users, and does not use a mobile application or information communication technology. In one study in the San Francisco Bay Area in 2014, researchers interviewed, observed, and surveyed participants at multiple casual carpooling locations. The study found that motivations for casual carpooling participation include: convenience, time savings, and monetary savings, while environmental and community-based motivations ranked low. Casual carpooling is an efficient transportation option for these commuters, while environmental sustainability benefits are a positive byproduct. Seventy-five percent of casual carpool users were previously public transit riders, and over 10% formerly drove alone. In the U.S., the modal share of ridesharing has declined since the 1970s. In 1970, The U.S. Census found that about 20% of American workers commuted to work by carpool. The American Community Survey has found that the carpooling modal share has declined to around nine percent as of 2013, though it still remains the second most popular mode of travel in the U.S., next to driving alone.

== On-demand ride services ==
On-demand ride services include ridehailing, ridesplitting, and E-hail for taxis. They are services that provide rides on-demand, usually in passenger cars, for a fee.

=== On-demand vehicle for hire ===
"Transportation network company" is a regulatory classification coined by the California Public Utilities Commission in 2013, and it has been subsequently used by other U.S. states to refer to services like Lyft and Uber. These include point-to-point on-demand rides, typically hailed, coordinated, and paid for via smartphone and from drivers using their own personal vehicles. Transportation experts have called these services "ridesourcing" or "ridehailing" to distinguish these services from ridesharing and to clarify that drivers do not share a destination with their passengers. Ridehailing companies have spread around the world and include: Uber, Lyft, Ola Cabs, DiDi, Grab, Gett, Cabify, Careem, Easy Taxi, and Fasten, among others. As of August 2017, 2 million people drive for Uber every week.

These companies have faced criticism for adversely impacting traffic congestion, the environment, and public safety. A study of ridehailing users in San Francisco in 2014 evaluated modal shifts due to ridehailing and found that, if ridehailing were unavailable, 39% of respondents would have taken a taxi and 33% would have used a form of public transit. Four percent entered a public transit station as their origin or destination, suggesting ridehailing may serve as a first-/last-mile trip to or from public transit in some cases. Another study of ridehailing users in Denver and Boulder, Colorado found that a third of respondents would have taken public transit, biked, or walked instead of using a ridehailing service. Another third would have driven in a personal vehicle, and 12% would not have made the trip. These city-specific differences suggest that travel behavior impacts due to these services could be dependent on location. Only New York City and San Francisco have studied the vehicle miles traveled (VMT) implications of ridehailing services. Both studies found that Uber and Lyft are increasing VMT, with the heaviest impacts seen in some of the busiest areas of each city. However, both of these studies do not take into consideration modal shift changes.

=== Ridesplitting ===
Ridesplitting involves splitting both a ride and fare in a vehicle with others traveling in the same general direction. These services allow dynamic matching and route variation in real time as passengers request pickups. The user cost of ridesplitting services is lower than the cost of regular ridesourcing services, since the riders are sharing one ride and splitting the associated costs. Yet, ridesplitting may lead to detour and inconvenience effects for the users. Ridesplitting services are generally only available as an option in cities with denser and more established ridesourcing markets. Ridesplitting is even less studied than ridesourcing, and therefore travel behavior impacts are not yet well understood.

=== E-Hail services ===
E-Hail services are a mode of transportation by which taxis can be reserved via Internet or mobile phone applications maintained by either a third-party provider or the taxi company. Examples of e-Hail services include Curb, Flywheel, Arro, Hailo, and iTaxi. In response to competition from ridesourcing companies, e-Hail taxi services have experienced rapid growth. As of October 2014, 80% of San Francisco taxis reported using Flywheel, an e-Hail app. As of February 2015, Flywheel was active in six cities, and Curb was active in about 60 U.S. cities. Since they use taxis, e-Hail services charge local taxi rates and do not use demand-based pricing during periods of higher ride demand, as ridesourcing services often do.

== Microtransit ==
Microtransit is a technology-enabled private transit service that often uses shuttles or vans and is characterized by flexible scheduling, flexible routing, or both. Current microtransit operators include Chariot (acquired by Ford in September 2016) and Via. Defunct operators include Bridj and Leap Transit. Two forms of microtransit have emerged, including fixed-route with fixed-schedule services and flexible-route with on-demand scheduling. Chariot, which started in San Francisco and now operates in Austin, New York, and Seattle, functions similarly to public transit and runs 15-seater vans along pre-determined routes. Chariot determines new routes by “crowdsourcing” potential customer demand and then launching a new route once enough demand is indicated. Via is an example of flexible route, on-demand microtransit and currently operates in New York City, Washington DC, and Chicago. In New York City, users request a ride using Via's app and a shared van will pick them up with other travelers heading in a similar direction. The service is dynamic, without static routes, and shifts routes based on expected traffic and rider demand. Via charges a fare of $5 to $7 per ride in New York City, depending on the method of booking. Both Chariot and Via conform to the IRS “transit pass” standard, allowing them to qualify for pre-tax commuter benefits.

Microtransit services have also gained interest among some public transit operators, who see the technology as an opportunity to provide higher quality or more flexible public transit services to their users. In some instances, like the (now defunct) RideKC: Bridj pilot project in Kansas City, Missouri, public-private partnerships have been formed to provide microtransit services. The RideKC: Bridj pilot ultimately ceased operations as it failed to attract enough riders, with only nine percent of riders taking more than 10 trips. The lack of a targeted marketing campaign, relatively high vehicle ownership rates in Kansas City, and low existing public transit mode share in the city were possible reasons for the low ridership of the pilot project. Public-private microtransit partnerships have the potential to improve service and increase public transit ridership, but steps must be taken to appropriately evaluate demand for the service before launching.

== Courier network services ==
Courier Network Services (CNS) provide delivery services of packages, food, and other items for compensation using their own transportation and are connected with shippers and customers through an online app or platform. In P2P delivery services, someone who signs up and is approved by the platform can use their own vehicle or bicycle to conduct a delivery. There are many business models within P2P delivery services. Postmates couriers make deliveries using their own bicycles, scooters, or cars. They charge a delivery fee plus a service charge of nine percent of the value of the goods being delivered. Instacart delivers groceries for a $4 to $10 fee, depending on how long the delivery takes to complete. The proliferation of these services, where couriers use their personally owned vehicles or bicycles, could reduce the need for delivery companies to maintain and own their own delivery fleet. Some CNS models that have emerged also incorporate on-demand ride services (e.g., TNCs) that deliver packages. CNS deliveries are either made in separate trips or in multiple-purpose trips that may also serve passengers simultaneously. Sidecar and Uber have incorporated passenger, food delivery, and package delivery services.

== Scootersharing ==
Scootersharing is a recent application of the sharing economy within the transportation space. Scootersharing companies took inspiration from the fourth generation bikesharing strategy, but replaced bicycles with GPS-tracked electric scooters. These scooters are also “dockless”, and are dropped off and picked up from any location within an urban area.

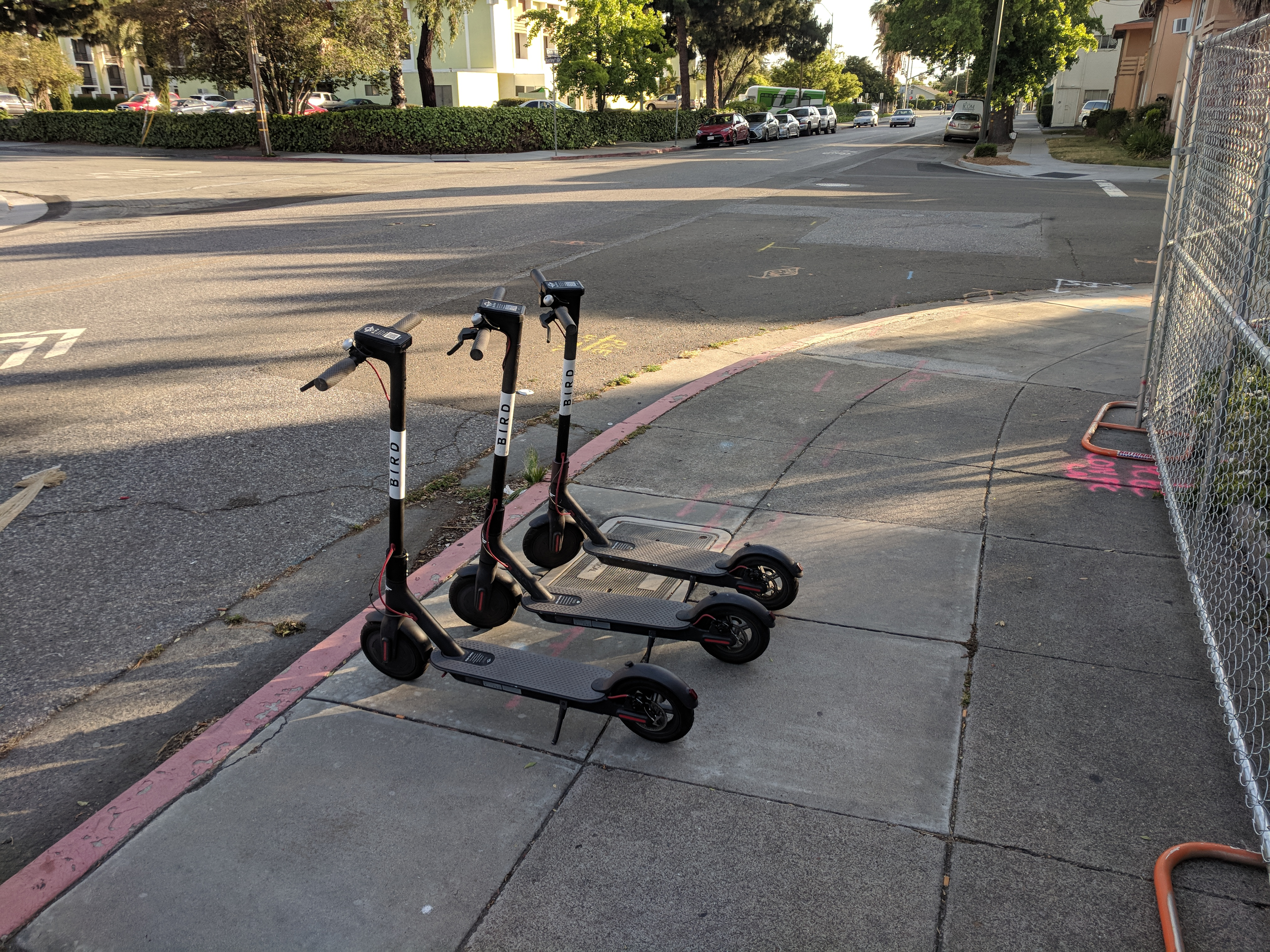
Shared Scooters

Due to the lower speed of scooters and their electric assistance, it is easier for commuters to use them and for companies to invest in a fleet of them. Many scootersharing companies have been founded in the past few years. This includes Bird, Lime, Bolt, Skip, Scoot Networks, and Spin.

Because of its growing popularity, some cities have also looked to ban certain scootersharing companies, taking on similar strategies to ridesharing bans. In San Francisco, the city created a Powered Scooter Share Permit Program that limits the number of companies that could operate scooters, and the amount of scooters. Cities that enforced similar regulations cite how scooters are more commonly ridden on sidewalks instead of bike lanes and could injure pedestrians. Other reasons would also be the lack of these companies enforcing riders to wear safety gear such as helmets.

Compared to the other forms of shared mobility, scootersharing can be more hyper-localized and can hypothetically better address the last mile problem. Because scootersharing does not have much market adoption right now because it is a new form of transportation, there are no academic studies that can effectively measure its impact. Overall, it provides urban mobility with fewer carbon emissions compared to automobiles. They take up less space than bikes, so they have potential to increase transit ridership to and from bus lines.

== Enabling technology: smartphone apps ==
Smartphones represent one of the most important transportation innovations of the 21st century. A variety of factors are changing the way people think about mobility including: demographic shifts, advancements in geo-spatial routing and computing power, the use of cloud technologies, faster wireless networks capable of carrying greater bandwidth, congestion, and heightened awareness about the environment and climate change. Mobility consumers are increasingly using smartphone applications, dubbed “apps” for an array of transportation use cases. More people are starting their trips with smartphones to plan routes, seek departure information for the next bus or railcar, find a taxi via an e-Hail app, or source a private driver through services, such as Lyft or Uber. Some factors driving transportation app growth are time savings; financial savings; incentives; and gamification.

Shared transport applications are built using technologies like global positioning systems (GPS), geographic information systems (GIS), cloud computing, wireless communication networks and application programming interfaces (APIs) to deliver real-time information and facilitate the coordination of transportation services for passengers.^^

The technologies that support smartphone applications allow shared mobility services to track vehicle locations, match passengers with available vehicles, and process information in real time.^ They also support dynamic routing and demand forecasting by analysing travel patterns and changing travel demand, allowing operators to improve service efficiency and respond to user needs more effectively. Digital payment systems integrated into mobile applications further enable users to make bookings and complete transactions within the same platform. The smartphone technologies have also helped integrated and multimodal mobility services to flourish and enabled their users to compare transport options, plan a trip by combining several transport modes, receive up-to-the-minute travel information, or arrange a transfer between transport modes at a single hand. All these functions enable transportation services to be accessed as well as being managed in a single digital space and make shared mobility easier to combine with other modes of transport.

With the further development of shared transportation systems, smartphone applications in the field of transportation have become indispensable elements for intelligent transportation systems (ITS), as they use shared communication technologies, real-time data processing, and the provision of transport information to increase accessibility, assist real-time decision-making, and improve the efficiency and user experience of modern shared transportation services.^

== Future of shared mobility and automation ==
Self-driving cars, in conjunction with shared mobility, have the potential to greatly increase the viability and user base of shared transportation services in the future. There has been great interest in the idea of shared automated vehicle (SAV) services in recent years. This interest is likely due to the highly publicized AV development space, as well as the popularity of ridesourcing services and the realization that operating cost per mile of mobility services may substantially decrease compared to current prices, with automation. Many experts, companies, public agencies, and universities are at the initial stages of exploring the potential impacts of SAVs.

A few pilots have launched involving ridesourcing services and automated vehicles. Uber began testing an AV service open to frequent customers in Pittsburgh, Pennsylvania in September 2016. Waymo (formerly Google's Self-Driving Car Project) has been testing an autonomous vehicle ride service in Arizona. Also during September 2016 in Singapore, nuTonomy and Grab partnered to offer a similar AV ridesourcing service in a business district called “one-north.” These SAV services require an engineer to closely monitor the system at all times. There have also been several automated shuttle service pilots around the world, although all are in the initial testing phase and operate in a low-speed setting. Low-speed SAV shuttle companies include: EasyMile EZ10, Local Motors, Auro, and Navya SAS.

The impact that SAV services may have on travel behavior, other transportation modes, the environment, and cities in general remains uncertain. As real-world deployment of SAVs has been extremely limited, most studies on the subject develop or modify existing models of travel behavior and include SAVs, with assumptions regarding their operations and vehicle types. Studies predict a modal shift away from private vehicle trips due to SAVs under certain sharing scenarios. The impact SAV services may have on VMT and congestion is uncertain as well, with some studies predicting that roadway capacity may be freed up due to more efficient operations and right-sizing of vehicles.

== Shared transport modes ==
- Real-time ridesharing
- Flexible carpooling
- Green travel
- Hail and ride
- High-occupancy vehicle lanes
- Hitchhiking
- Slugging
- The commons
- Truck sharing
- Vanpooling

=== Group travel ===
- Carpooling (ride sharing)
- Demand responsive transport
- Paratransit
- Share taxi

=== Rental travel ===
- Bicycle-sharing system
- Carsharing
