= Transport in Paris =

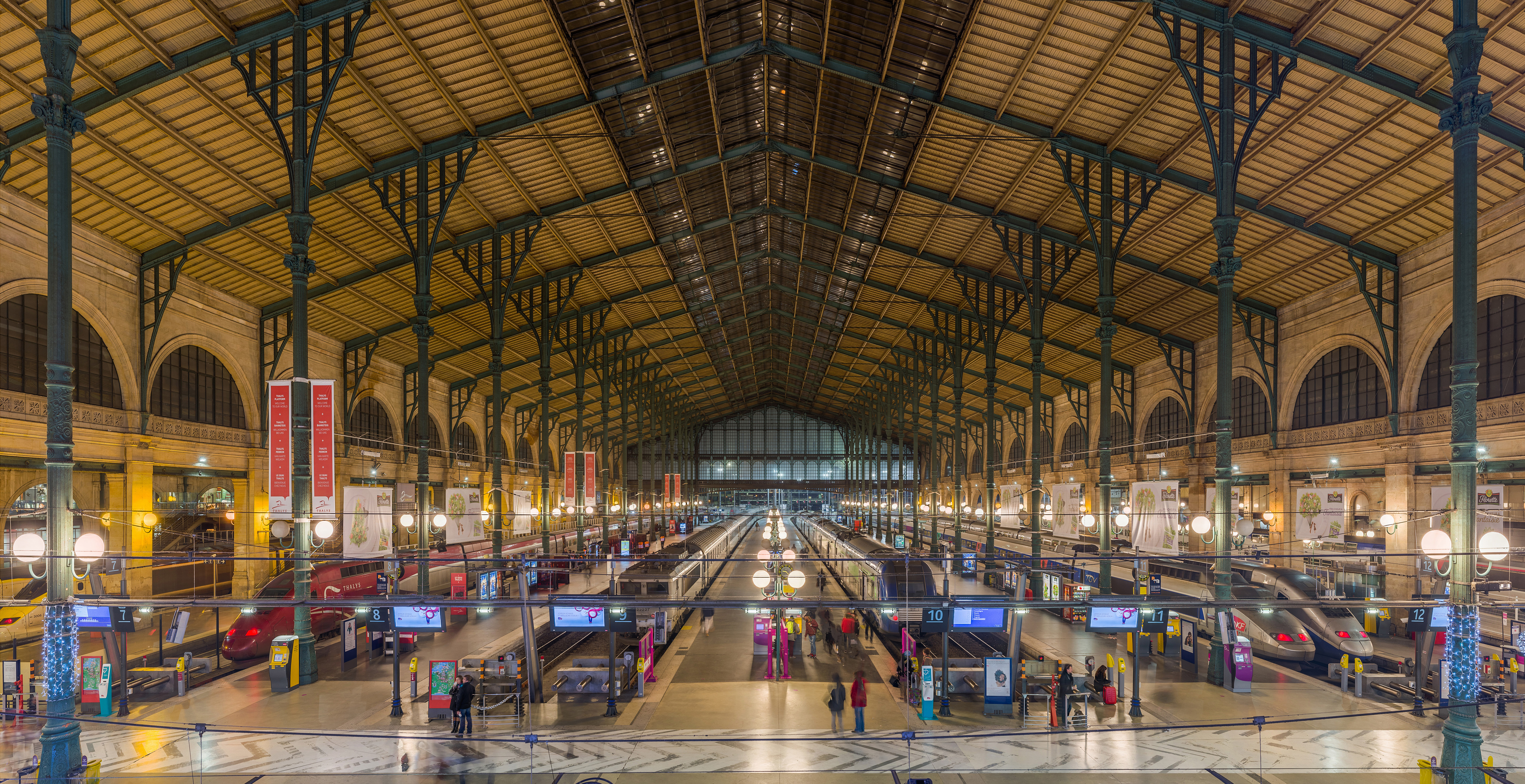
Gare du Nord, one of Paris's seven large mainline railway station termini, is the busiest train station outside Japan.

Paris is the centre of a national, and with air travel, international, complex transport system. The modern system has been superimposed on a complex map of streets and wide boulevards that were set in their current routes in the 19th century. On a national level, it is the centre of a web of road and railway, and at a more local level, it is covered with a dense mesh of bus, tram and metro service.

== Environmental performance ==
Paris has one of the most sustainable transportation systems in the world (private cars are only 4.3% of the overall traffic in the city centre) and is one of only two cities that received the Sustainable Transport Award twice, in 2008 and 2023. The second is Bogotá. The award was accorded for the continual efforts to expand active transportation networks, including specifically designated to help children, women, disabled persons. By the year of 2026, half of parking spaces should be turned into green spaces, bike lanes, spaces used for shared mobility and playgrounds.

In the years 2022–2023, 53.3% of the trips in the city centre were made on foot, 30% on public transport, 11.2% on bicycles and 4.3% on cars.

Bike lanes are being doubled, while electric car incentives are being created. The French capital is banning the most polluting automobiles from key districts. During only one year, the use of bicycles rose by 54%.

In 2022 the organization "Tools of change" finished a landmark case study about the transportation system in Paris. According to the study during the years 2010–2020 the modal share of cars in Paris declined from 12.8% to 6% while the modal share of active transportation (walking, cycling) rose from 55.4% to 68% (more than in Copenhagen and Barcelona) due to a combination of several governmental and local programs. Contrarily, in the whole Métropole du Grand Paris region the modal share of cars rose in those years from 39.5% to 43% and the modal share of active transportation declined from 40.3% to 36%. The use of public transport declined in Paris and slightly rose in the Paris Metropolis.

In March 2025, Parisiens approved a referendum, turning 500 more streets (5-8 per neighborhood) and 10,000 more parking lots into walking paths, cycle lanes, and greenery. 300 streets and 10,000 parking lots have already been transformed since 2020. The population will be further consulted about which streets will be converted.

== Streets and thoroughfares ==
Paris is known for the non-linearity of its street map, as it is a city that grew 'naturally' around roadways leading to suburban and more distant destinations. Centuries of this demographic growth created a city cramped, labyrinth-like and unsanitary, until a late 19th century urban renovation, overseen by Georges-Eugène Haussmann, resulted in the wide boulevards we see there today. This remained relatively unchanged until the 1970s, and the construction of cross-city and periphery expressways.

More recently, the city began renovations to prioritise public transport systems, and has created 'purpose' lanes dedicated to buses, taxis, and, more recently, cyclists, narrowing the passages reserved for automobiles and delivery vehicles. Although reducing traffic flow within the city itself, this traffic modification often results in traffic congestion at the capital's gateway thoroughfares.

== Public transport ==
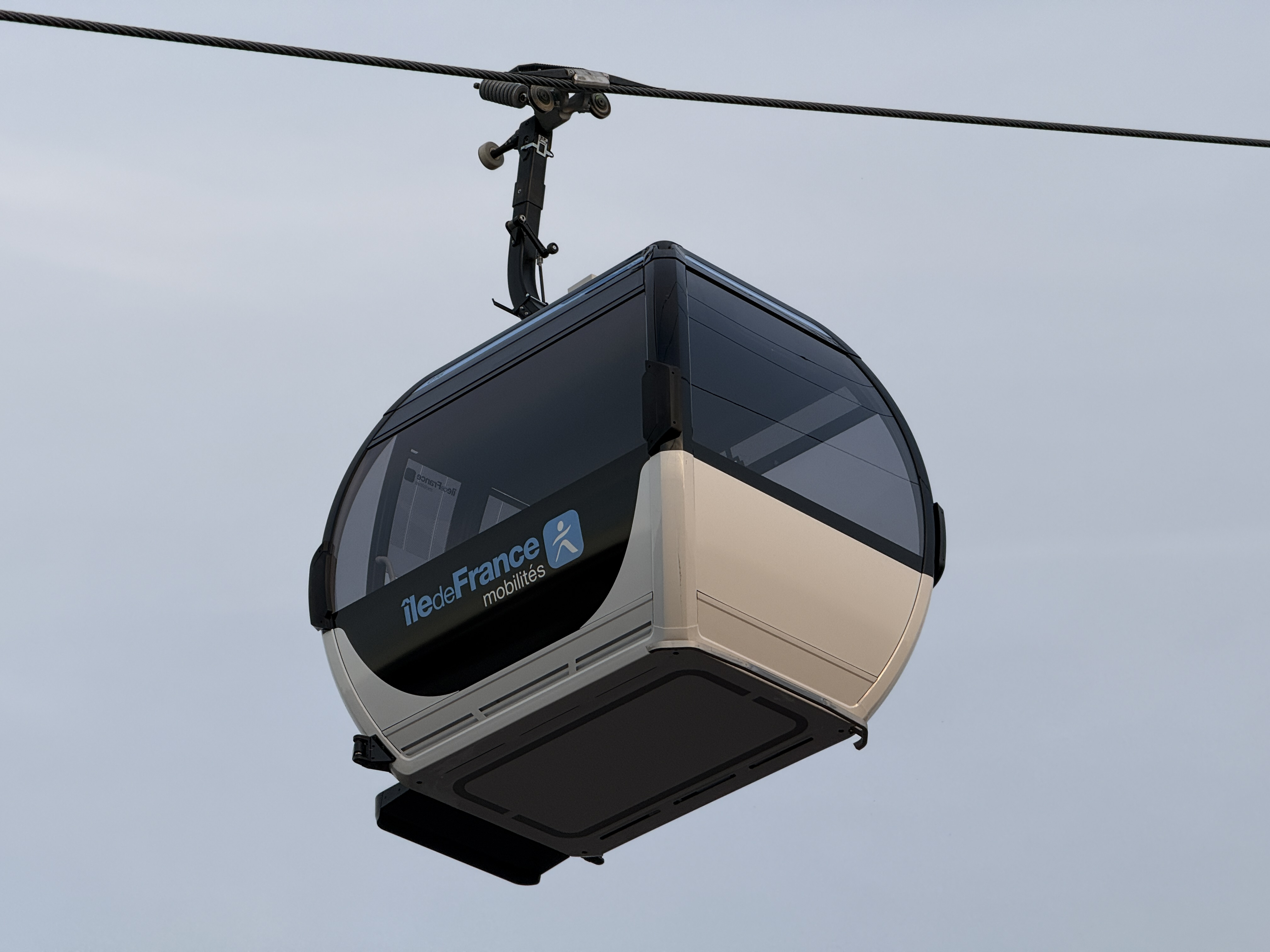
Câble 1

Paris's most-frequented public transport is the Métro network, mostly underground. Across 16 lines, its closely spaced stations (around 500 metres between them on average) allow a connection between any capital quarter to any other, and a few lines extend quite far into the suburbs. This is complemented by a bus route network of 347 lines. Since 1992, the tramway has made a reappearance with 14 lines in the Île-de-France region, mostly outside the city borders. Paris is also the hub of the Réseau Express Régional (RER), a train network with higher speeds and wider stop spacing than the Métro which connects the capital to its suburbs. The Transilien, a rail network radiating from the capital's train stations, provides service to other suburban destinations.

A Navigo card can be used to pay public transport fares in the Île-de-France.

=== Organisation ===
For the governance of Paris-area public transport, the basic rule of thumb is that the RATP (Régie Autonome des Transports Parisiens) governs all transport within and extending from the Parisian Capital, and the SNCF (Société Nationale des Chemins de Fer Français, the state-owned rail company whose network covers all of France) governs all transport outside of and only penetrating the capital, but there are exceptions to this rule. Metro, Tramway, most of the Bus services and parts of the RER network are run by the RATP. Other sections of the RER, as well as the Transilien, are run by the SNCF.

=== Statistics ===
The average amount of time people spend commuting with public transit in Paris, for example to and from work, on a weekday is 64 minutes. 15% of public transit riders ride for more than 2 hours every day. The average amount of time people wait at a stop or station for public transit is 12 minutes, while 14% of riders wait for over 20 minutes on average every day. The average distance people usually ride in a single trip with public transit is 10.8 km (6.7 mi), while 29.% travel for over 12 km (7.5 mi) in a single direction.

=== Métro ===
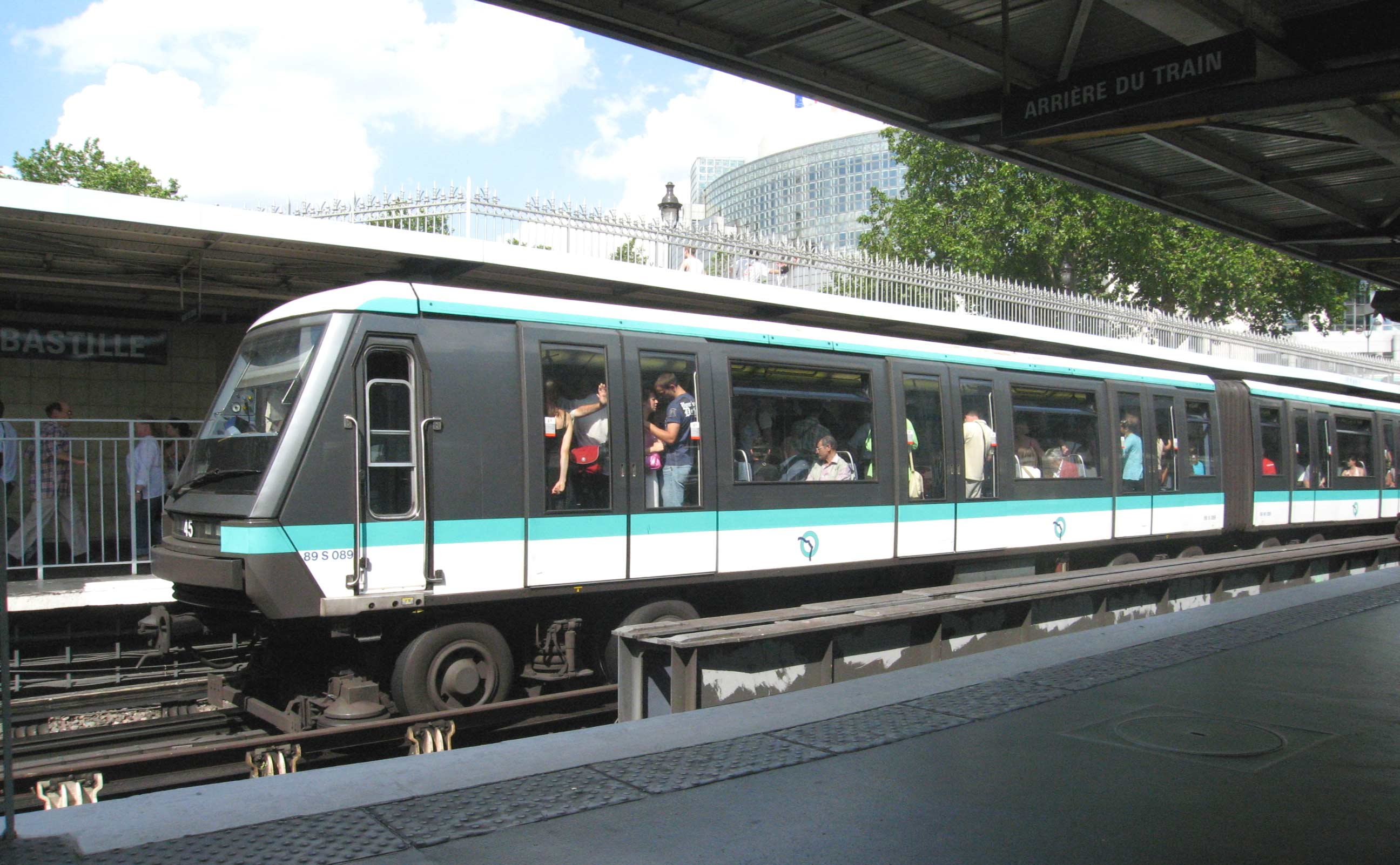
MP 89 tyre train on line 1 at Bastille Station.

Paris's métro has 16 lines, and 12 of these penetrate into the surrounding suburbs. Lines 2 and 6 form a circle within Paris, with most other lines crossing the city diametrically.

=== RER ===
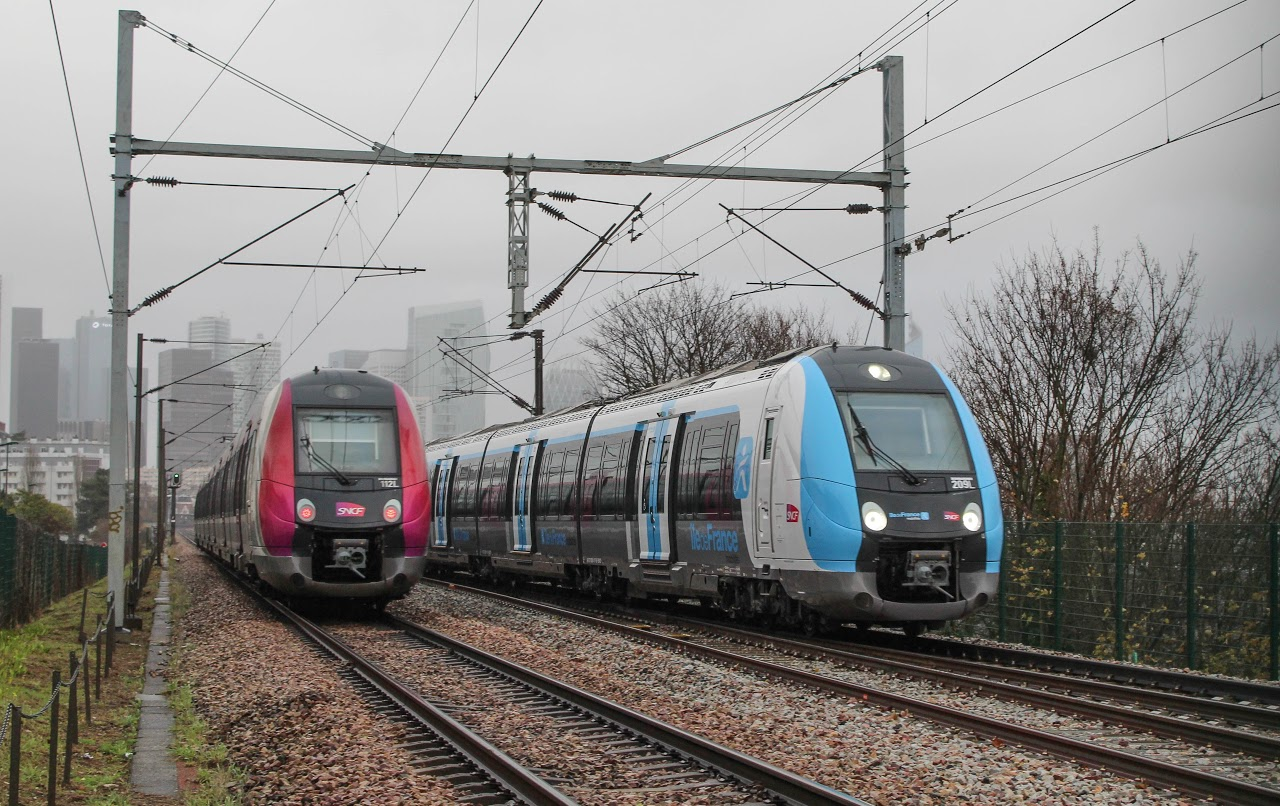
Z 50000 (RER E and Transilien Line P)

The RER (Réseau Express Régional) is a network of regional trains that run far into the suburbs of Paris, with fewer stops within the city itself. From its first line A in 1977, it has grown into a network of five lines, A, B, C, D and E: three (A, B, and D) pass through Paris's busiest and most central Châtelet-Les-Halles station. Line C occupies the path of former railways along the Seine's Rive Gauche quays, and the most recently built line E passes through Paris's Gare Saint-Lazare train station for destinations to Paris's north-east and north-west.

=== Transilien ===
Transilien trains operate on suburban lines connecting Paris's main stations to the suburbs not reached by the RER. The Transilien lines are named as a play-on-words for the "transit" of "Franciliens," inhabitants of the "Île-de-France" région of which Paris is the capital. lien also means link in French.

=== Tramway ===
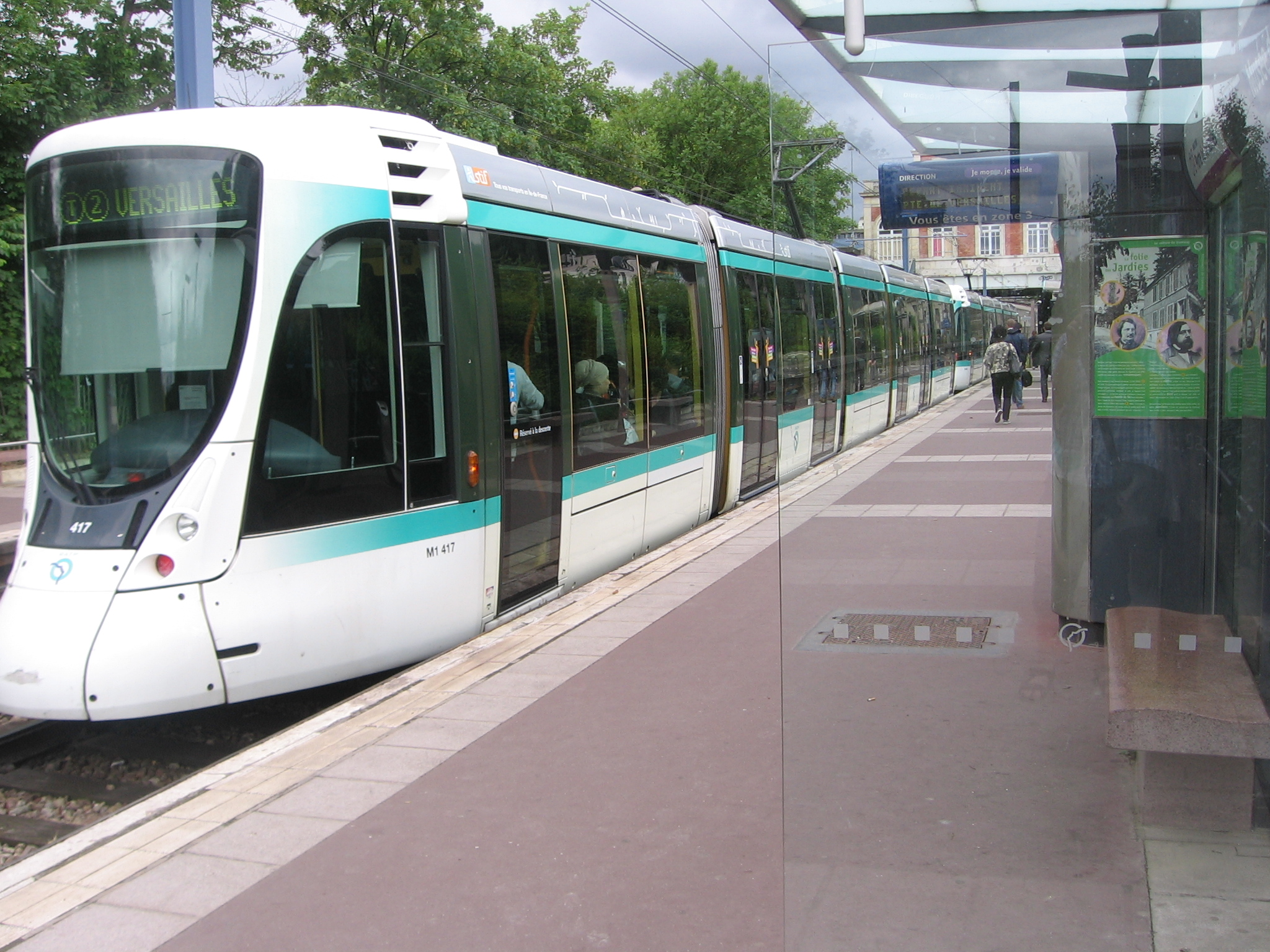
A Paris tram

All of Paris's tramways had stopped running by 1937, but this mode of transport has returned recently. Beginning in 1992, two lines (the T1 and T2) were built parallel to the outer boundaries of the capital. The T3 line, opened in stages starting in 2006, runs on grassy track alongside much of the city borders of Paris.

=== Bus ===
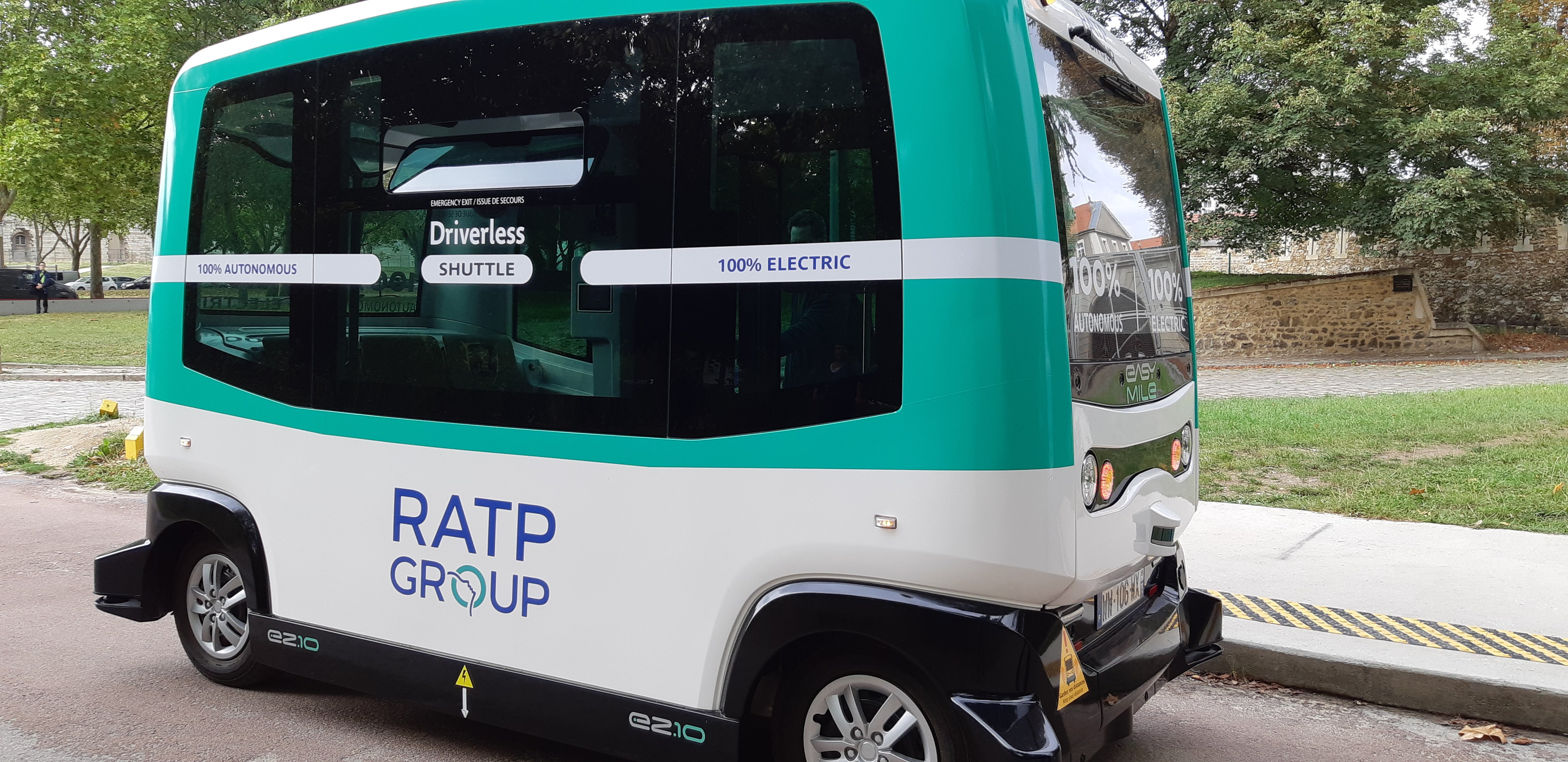
Autonomous buses experiment in Vincennes.

Paris's bus lines interconnecting all points of the capital and its closest suburban cities. There are 58 bus lines operating in Paris that have a terminus within city limits.

The capital's bus system has been given a major boost over the past decade. Beginning in early 2000, Paris's major arteries have been thinned to reserve an express lane reserved only for bus and taxi, usually designated with signs and road markings. More recently, these bus lanes have been isolated from the rest of regular circulation through low concrete barriers that form "couloirs" (corridors) and prevent all other forms of Paris traffic from even temporarily entering them. The greater Paris region has three Bus Rapid Transit lines, being the T Zen, Line 393, and the Trans Val De Marne.

There are electric buses. Autonomous buses are also being experimented in Vincennes since November 2017.

=== Cycling ===
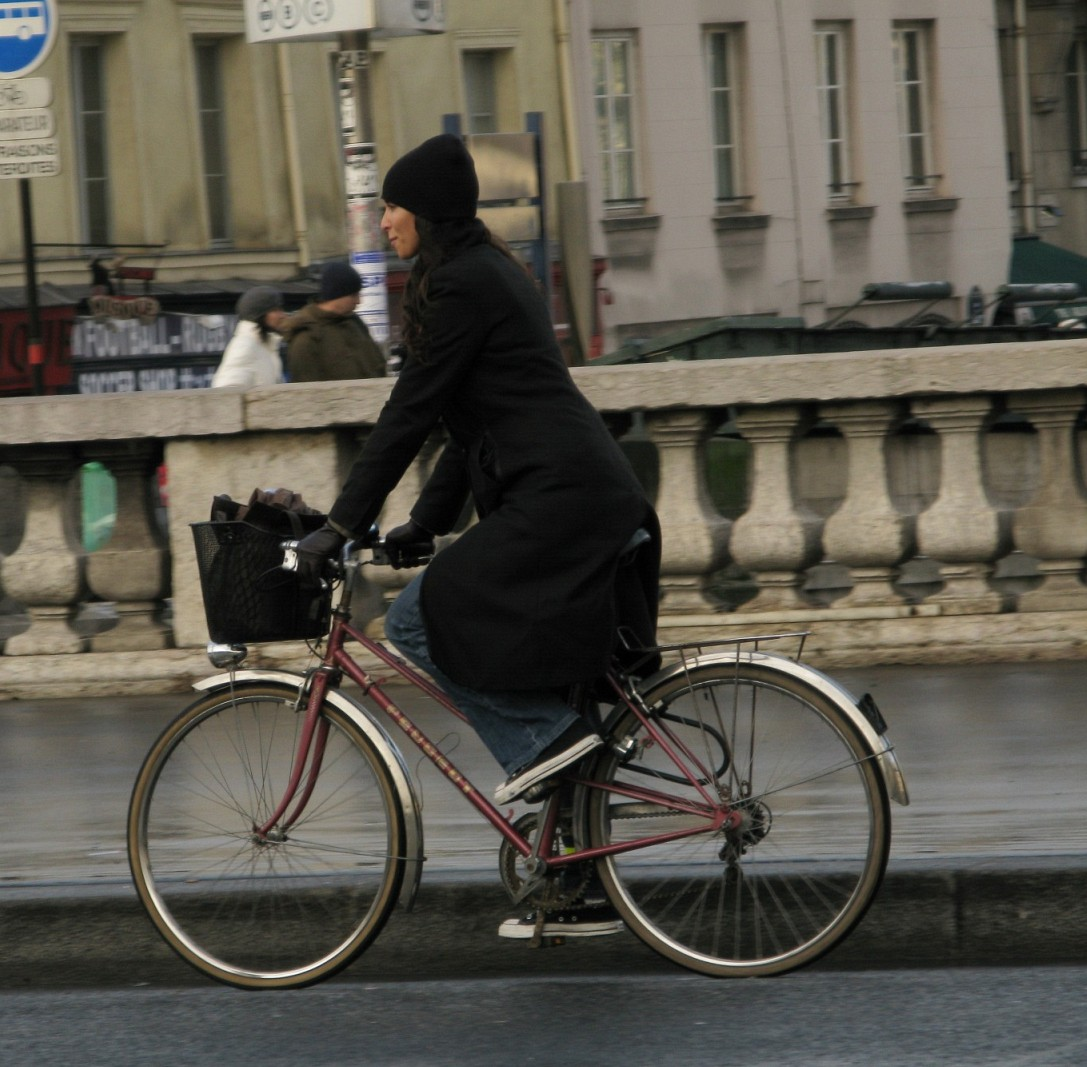
Cycling is common in Paris.

Cycling is becoming a popular mode of transport in Paris although the infrastructure are still very scarce. The Vélib bike hire scheme was introduced in the middle of 2007 with over 20,000 bicycles available at hire points throughout the city.

Under Mayor Anne Hidalgo, 84 km of bike lanes lanes were built in 2020–2025. Bicycle usage rose by 71% between the end of the COVID-19 lockdowns and 2023.

== National and international rail connections ==
Paris's first "embarcadère" train station, the predecessor to the gare Saint-Lazare, appeared from 1837 as a home for the novelty Paris-à-Saint-Germain local line. Over the following ten years, France's developing rail network would give Paris five (including the Saint-Lazare station) national railway stations and two suburban lines, and from 1848 Paris would become the designated centre of an "Étoile" (star) spider-web of rail with reaches to (and through) all of France's borders. This pattern is still very visible in France's modern railway map.

As far as national and European destinations are concerned, rail transport is beginning to outdistance air travel in both travel time and efficiency. The still-developing SNCF's TGV (Train à Grande Vitesse) network, since its birth in 1981, brings France's most southerly Marseille only 3 hours from the capital. A train similar to the TGV, the Eurostar, has been connecting Paris to central London by rail in 2h 15 since 1994, and in the opposite direction, the Thalys train service connects Brussels in 1h22 with up to 26 departures per day, Amsterdam in 3h18 with up to 10 departures per day and Cologne in 3h14, with up to 6 departures per day.

== National and international air connections ==
Busiest destinations from Paris airports (CDG, ORY, BVA) in 2014
Destinations	Locality	Passengers
Italy	International	7,881,497
Spain	International	7,193,481
United States	International	6,495,677
Germany	International	4,685,313
United Kingdom	International	4,177,519
Toulouse	Domestic	3,158,331
Morocco	International	3,148,479
Portugal	International	3,018,446
Nice	Domestic	2,865,602
Algeria	International	2,351,402
China	International	2,141,527
Switzerland	International	1,727,169
Bordeaux	Domestic	1,539,478
Marseille	Domestic	1,502,196
Pointe-à-Pitre	Domestic	1,191,437
Saint-Denis (Réunion)	Domestic	1,108,964
Fort-de-France	Domestic	1,055,770
Montpellier	Domestic	807,482
Biarritz	Domestic	684,578
Lyon	Domestic	613,395

Paris had its first airport in the fields of Issy-les-Moulineaux (just to the southern limits of Paris by its Seine river's Left Bank) from the first aviation trials of 1908. Aviation became a serious mode of transport during the course of World War I, which in 1915 led to the installation of a larger and more permanent runway installation near the town of Le Bourget to the north of Paris. A yet larger airport to the south of the Capital, Orly Airport, began welcoming flights from 1945, and yet another airport to the north of the city, Roissy-Charles-de-Gaulle, opened its gates from 1974.

Today the former airfields of Issy-les-Moulineaux have become a Heliport annex of Paris, and Le Bourget an airfield reserved for smaller aircraft. Roissy-Charles-de-Gaulle takes the majority of international flights to and from Paris, and Orly is a host to mostly domestic and European airline companies.

A few low-cost carrier airlines, notably Ryanair and Wizz Air, offer flights to Beauvais–Tillé Airport and Châlons Vatry Airport, while marketing these airports as Paris airports. These airports are a lot farther from Paris than Orly and CDG, similarly to airports around London, located hours away from the city center.

== History ==
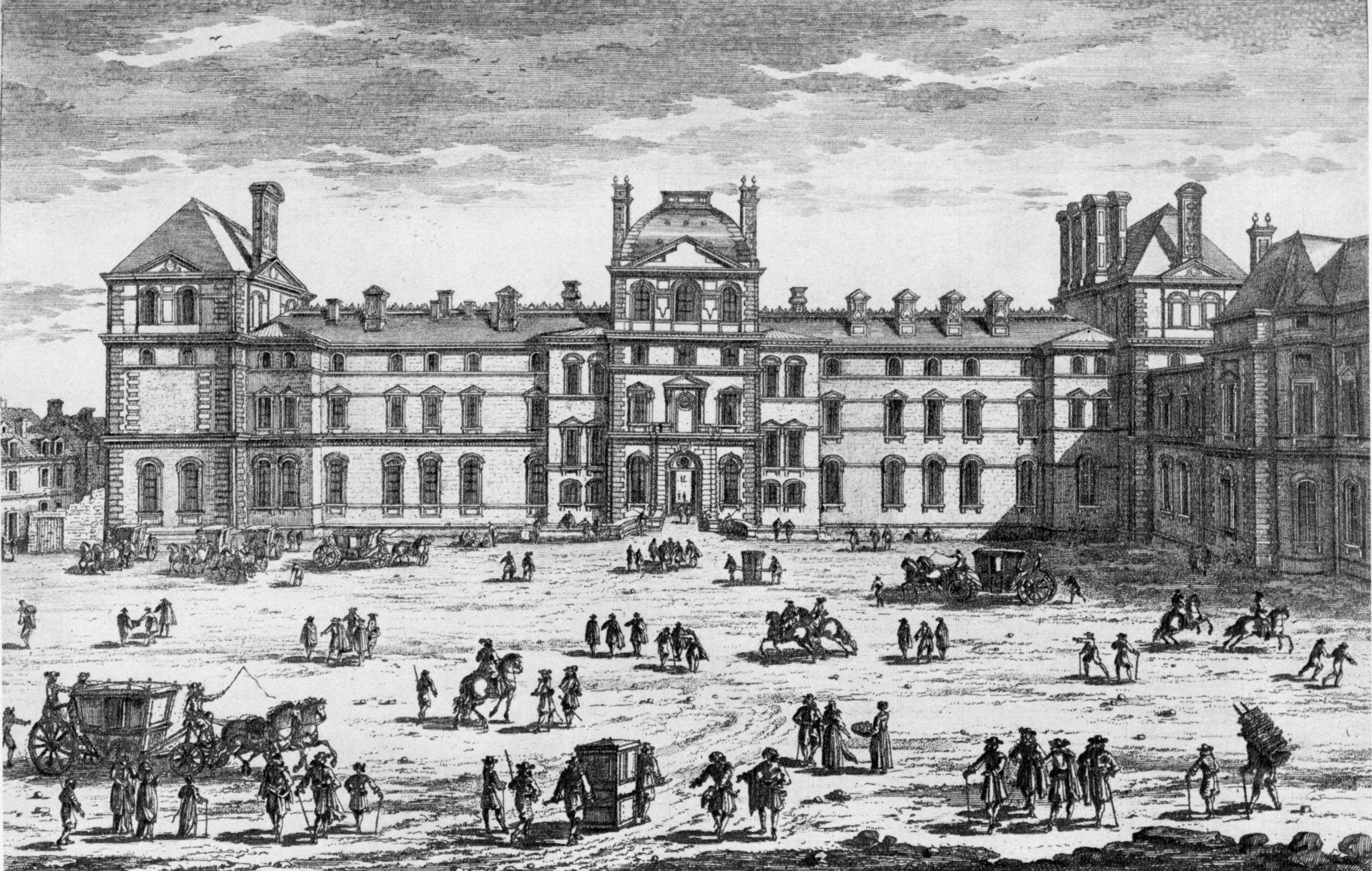
Carriages and chairs with bearers, in front of the Louvre construction site, by Gabriel Pérelle, about 1665

In the Middle Ages, Paris was densely populated, but small, with the population packed within the city walls. As late as 1610 it was possible to walk from one side of the city to the other in about thirty minutes. While the nobility and wealthy had carriages, horses or chairs carried by porters, ordinary citizens had to walk. As the city grew, a new means of transport was needed.

In 1617, letters of patent were granted for the first public transport service, chairs and porters for hire. The earliest chairs were uncovered, but then covered chairs were imported from London. Beginning in 1671, the chairs and porters had competition from chairs mounted on two wheels, pushed by one or several men. They were known as brouettes, roulettes or vinaigrettes. These continued to serve Parisians well in the 18th century, with rates set by the city government.

The first public transit service in the modern sense (fixed routes, distance based fares, a seven and a half minute headway) were the short-lived Carrosses à cinq sols introduced on the basis of an idea by Blaise Pascal. They were withdrawn shortly after their introduction in the 1660s.

=== Fiacres, Taxis ===
Early in the 17th century, the first wheeled one-horse carriages with drivers for hire, called fiacres, were introduced in Paris. Several companies existed, and rates were set by the Parlement of Paris in 1666. There were thirty-three stations around Paris where they could be hired. Their numbers increase from 45 in 1804 to 900 in 1818 to 2600 in over ten thousand in 1900, about the time for the first automobile taxis were introduced. The last horse-drawn fiacre disappeared in 1922.

The first automobile taxicabs were introduced in Paris in 1898. There were eighteen in service during the 1900 Exposition, and more than four hundred by 1907, though they were still outnumbered by fiacres. Paris taxis played a memorable part in World War I, carrying French soldiers to the front in the First Battle of the Marne in 1914. There were more than ten thousand taxis in Paris in 1949.

=== The Omnibus, Autobus ===
The horse-drawn omnibus, a large square coach with rows of seats inside, carrying between 12 and 18 passengers each, was introduced in Paris in 1828. They ran from seven in the morning until seven in the evening, until midnight on the Grands Boulevards. By 1840 there were twenty-three omnibus lines operated by thirteen different companies. In 1855, Emperor Napoleon III ordered all the lines consolidated into a single company, the Compagnie Générale des omnibus.

=== The Tramway ===
Beginning in 1852, the omnibus faced competition from the horse-drawn tramway, which ran on a track. The first tramway line ran from the Place de la Concorde to Passy, and, since it was modeled after the tramway system of New York, it was known as the chemin de fer Americain, or American railway. Additional lines were built between 1855 and 1857 between Rueil and Port-Marly and between Sèvres and Versailles. The first steam-driven trams were tried from 1876, but they were too costly and were not a success.

The first electric tramway line was opened in April 1892 between Saint-Denis and the Madeleine. In 1900, most public transport was still horse-drawn. On the 89 omnibus lines and 34 tramway lines in 1900, there were 1,256 horse-drawn vehicles, and just 490 electric trams.

By 1914, the situation had changed dramatically. All of the tramway cars were electric, and the network of tramway lines covered the entire city, except for the Champs-Élysées, the avenue de l'Opera, and the Grands Boulevards. Soon afterwards, the tramways faced growing competition from automobiles, and the trams were blamed for slowing down traffic. In 1929, the Municipal Council decided to replace the trams with motorbuses. On 15 May 1937, the last tram ran between porte de Vincennes and the Porte de Saint-Cloud.

Trams made a comeback beginning in the 1990s, when the city decided to encourage more clean-energy modes of transport, and opened nine new Paris-suburb tram lines.

=== The Predecessor to the Metro: The Petite Ceinture ===
In 1850 the government decided to create the Chemin de fer de Ceinture, a railroad line around the city periphery, to connect the main stations that until then had to shuttle freight between them across Paris's streets. Construction began from 1851, the first sections were opened later the same year, and its Rive Droite section was operational by the end of 1852.

The Nord company Paris-Auteuil passenger line opened from 1854. The Chemin de fer de Ceinture rail companies were loath to open their freight line to passenger service (that they thought would encumber freight transport), but eventually gave in to government pressure and opened five Rive Droite passenger stations that opened for service from 14 July 1862. With the opening of the Rive Gauche section from 1867, and the completion of a connection between the Auteuil and Rive Droite sections in 1869, passengers could travel in an uninterrupted ring, through twenty-five stations, around the capital.

The Chemin de fer de Petite Ceinture (that had become 'Petite' from 1882 because of the construction of a wider ring of Grande Ceinture rail) was almost a predecessor to the Paris métro: it carried more than twenty million passengers in 1889, and forty million in the year of the 1900 Paris Exposition. After the first Paris metro line opened that year Ceinture passenger numbers dropped steadily; 24 million in 1910 and 12 million in 1920, and it ran up a large deficit each year. In 1931, the Municipal Council decided to stop passenger service. On 31 July 1934 the train service was replaced by a bus line around the city.

=== The Métro ===
Paris was well behind other cities in having its own Metro; London (1863), New York City (1868), Budapest (1896) and Vienna (1898). The project was delayed by political battles about where it would run; the railways, supported by the government, wanted a system that would connect the different stations with each other and with the Paris suburbs, while the City of Paris wanted a system that would operate only inside the twenty arrondissements. In 1898, with the 1900 Paris Universal Exposition approaching, the city won the battle. Work began on the first six lines, totaling 65 kilometres.

The first line was between Porte de Vincennes and Porte-Maillot, which served the Exposition site at the Grand Palais. Line 2 between Porte Dauphine and Nation opened in April 1903. The line between Etoile and Nation (now line number 6) was finished in 1905. The new system crossed the Seine via two bridges, at Passy and Bercy; a third, at Austerlitz, was added. In April 1905, the first tunnel under the river was opened. By 1970 there were six tunnels under the Seine and five bridges used by the Metro lines within the city.

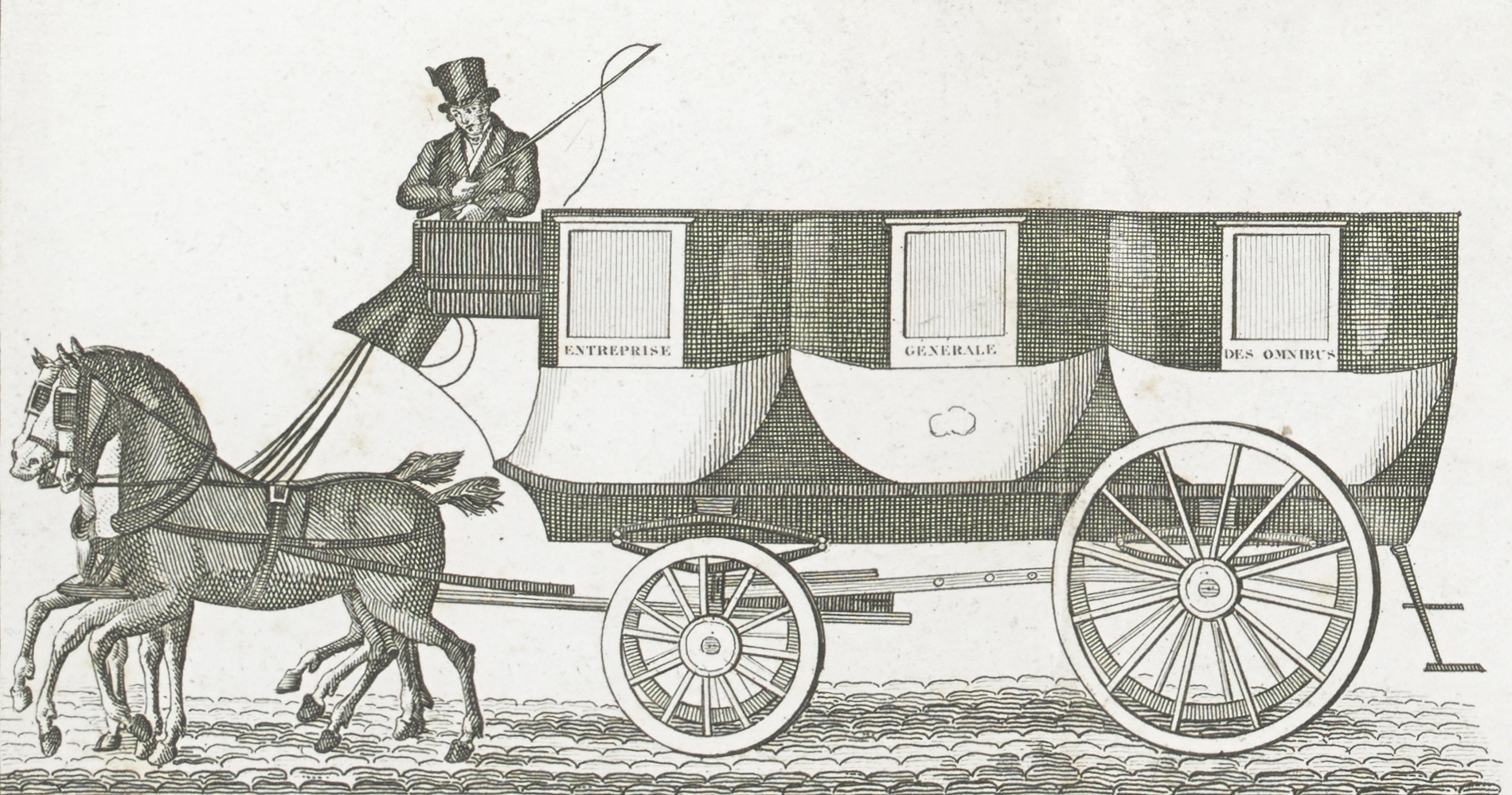
Paris Omnibus, 1828

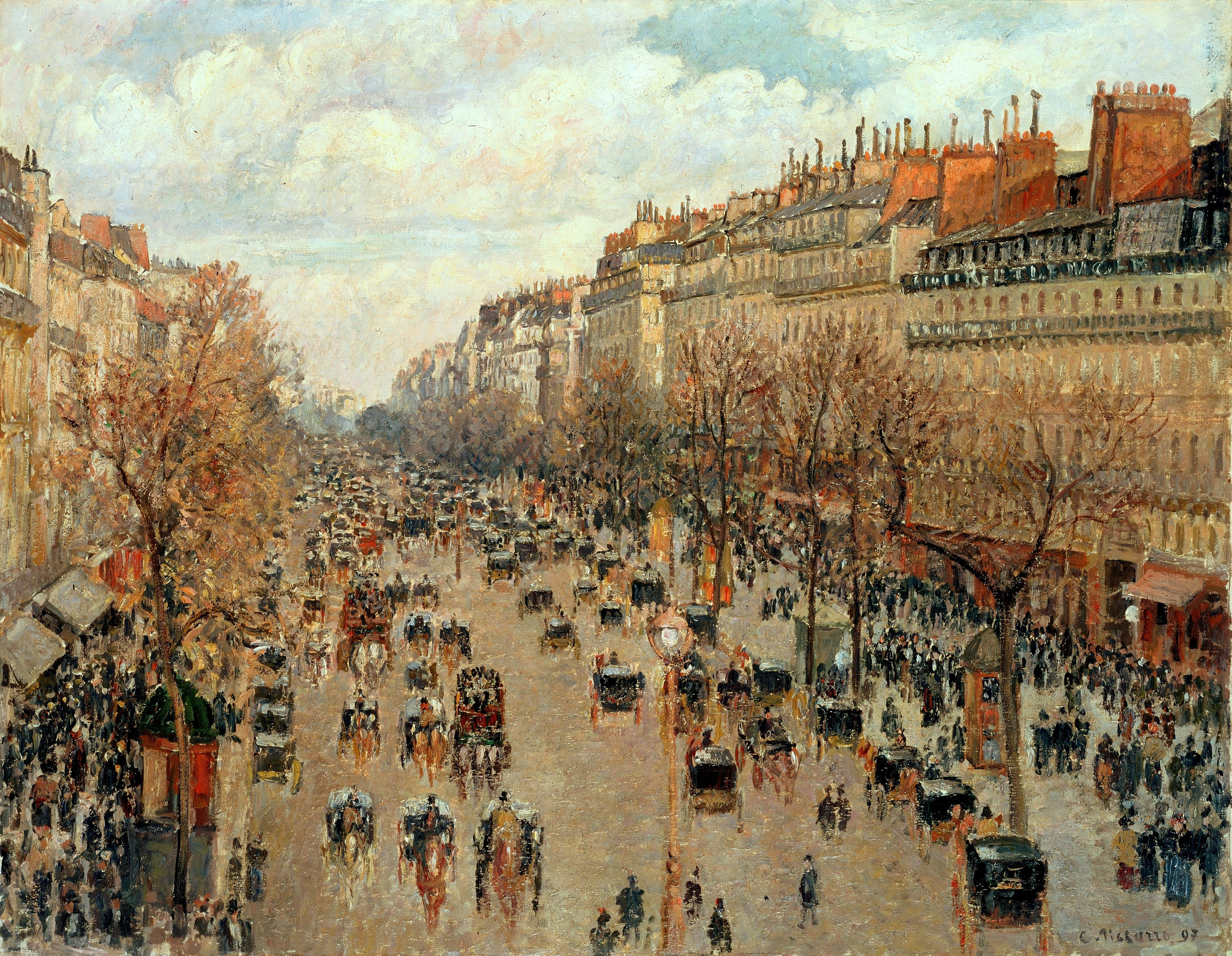
Fiacres on Boulevard Montmartre, by Camille Pissarro, 1897

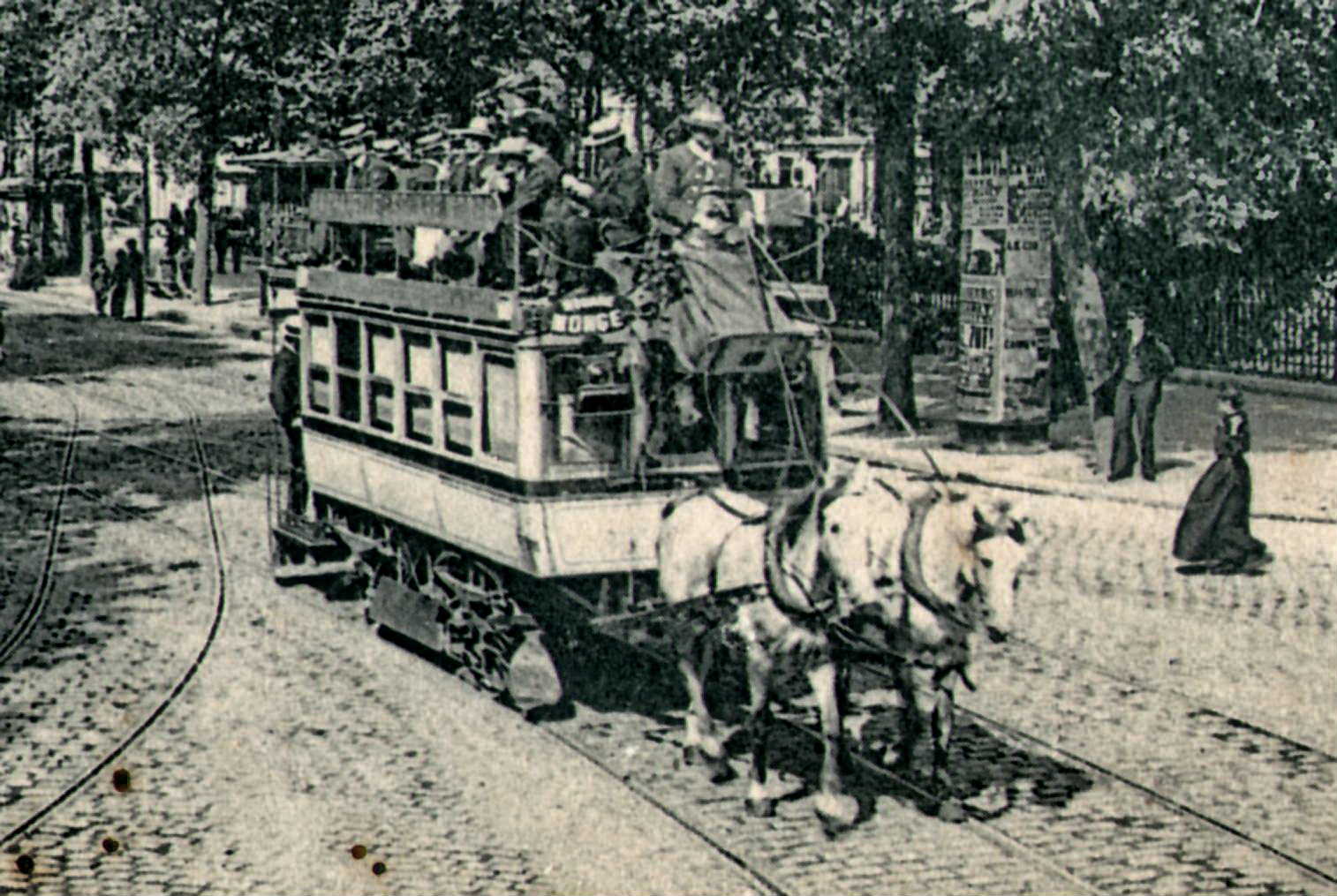
A horse-drawn tram on Boulevard de Sebastopol, about 1906

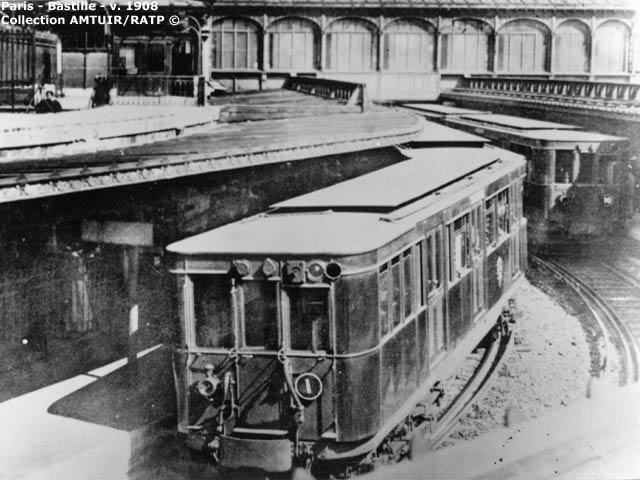
A Metro car at Bastille station, on the first line constructed, 1908

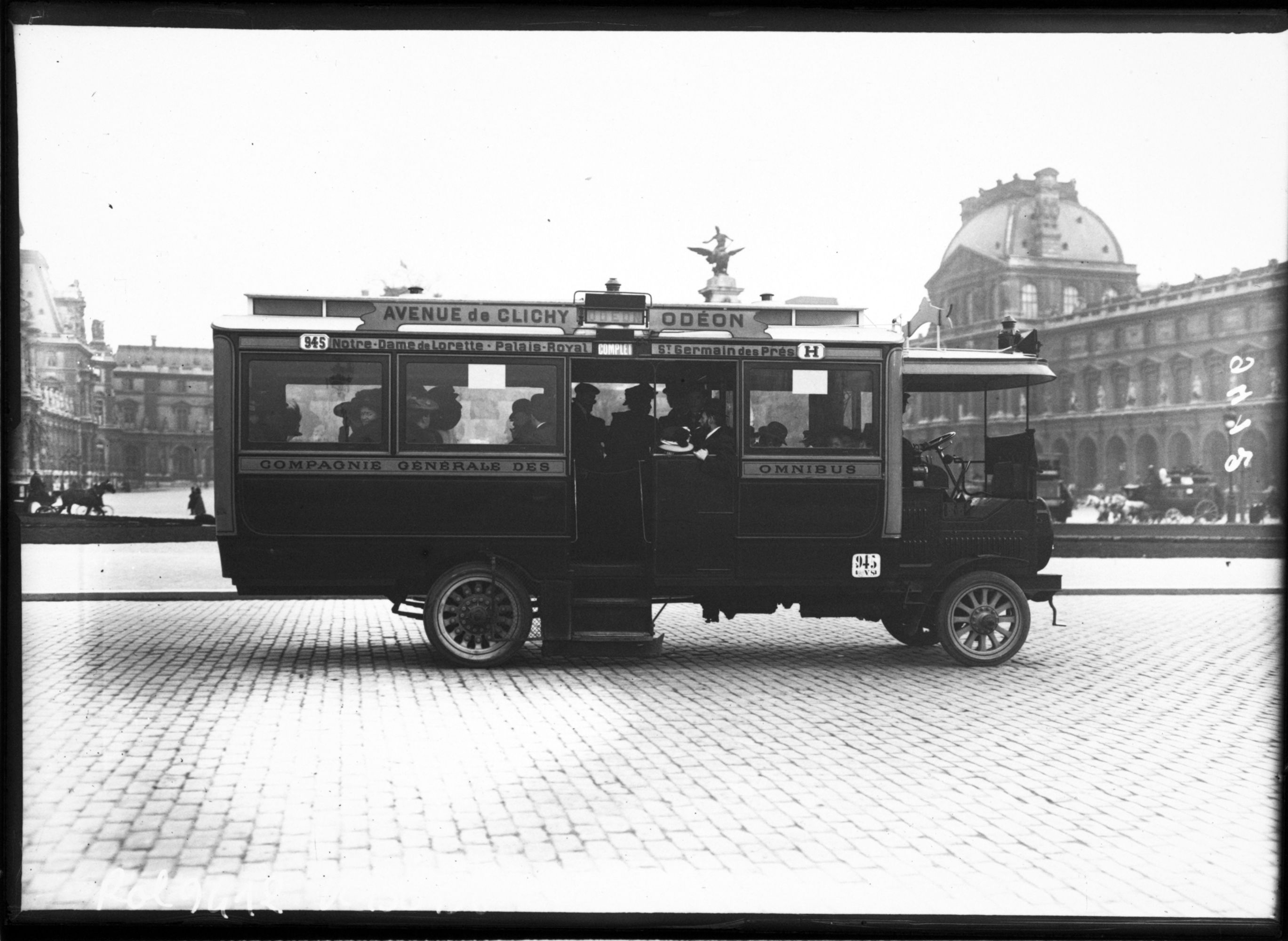
Motorized Omnibus on Place du Carrousel, 1910

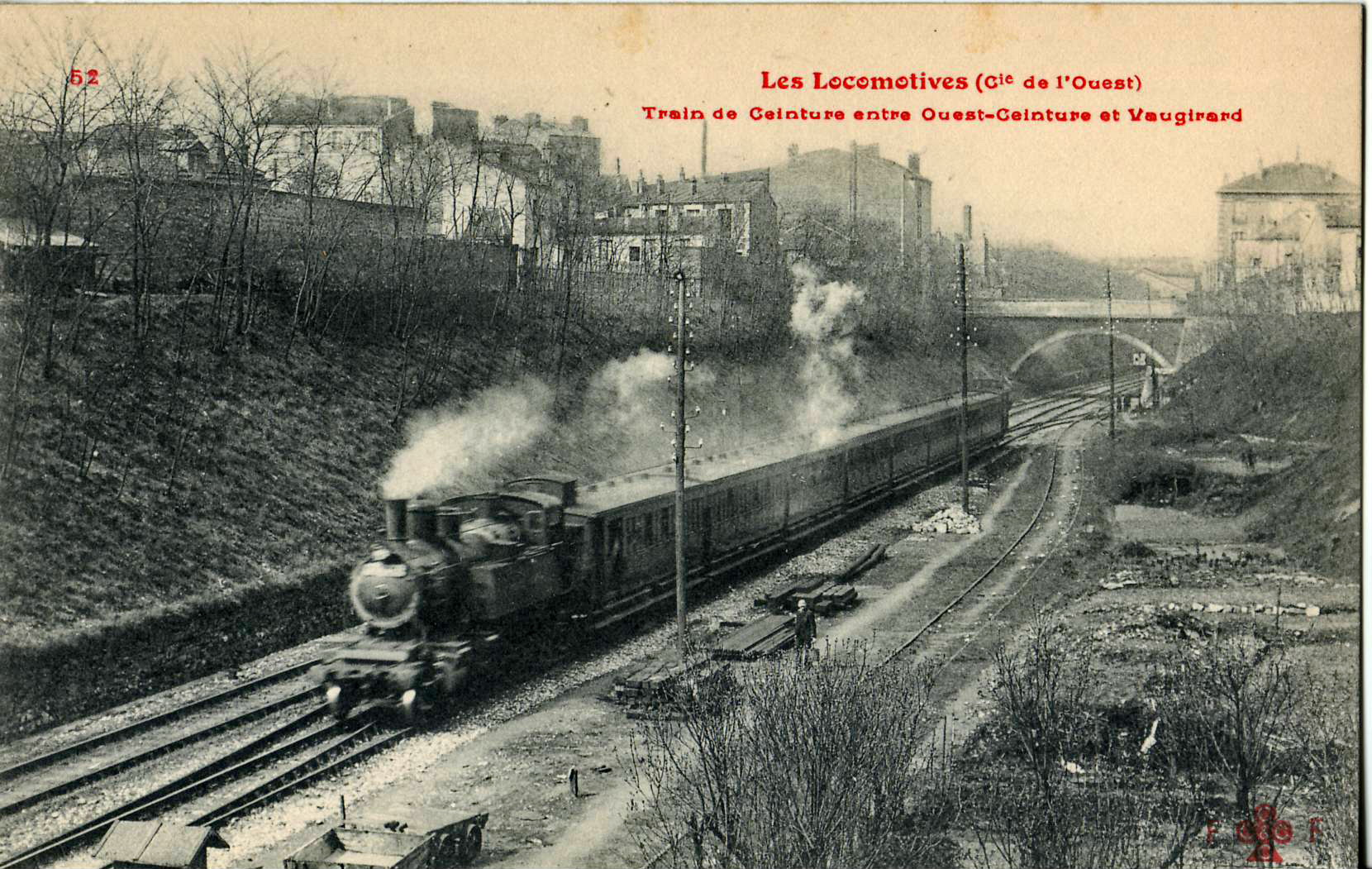
Petit Ceinture passenger train, before 1914

=== Chronology of Parisian transport ===
- 13th century. First mention of Charrettes and bacs.
- 14th century. Carts and trams for sovereigns and the King's court; covered litters for women nobles.
- 1405. Isabeau of Bavaria enters the Capital in Paris's first known chariot branlant (suspended buggy).
- 22 October 1617. The first taxi concession for portable chairs, followed by other like concessions for chariots and carts. The chariots of the latter concession, granted by the King to a certain Nicolas Sauvage, were later called fiacres because of their habit of waiting for fares in front of one of Paris's (then few) major hotels named for the Saint Fiacre.
- 1653. New association under (with) Charles Villerme, given the privilege (by the King) of renting horse-drawn carriages. The same with Givray in 1657, and again with Catherine Henriette de Bourbon in 1661.
- 1662, January. The King distributes licence letters to the duc de Rouanès, the Mis. de Sourches et le Mis. de Crénan to circulate their rentable carriages along a fixed route – in other words, Paris's first bus system. There were five cross-town itineraries and one circular.
- 1664. Four-place horse-drawn open carriages: chaise de Crénan – served first as a city carriage, then as a rentable "taxi" carriage.
- 1671. New types of carriages appear: roulettes, brouettes et vinaigrettes. Other transports in use that year: cabriolet, modern coach, sedans, two-floor sedans (with top rack), face-to-face coaches, sedan-cut or diligence-cut (side doors) coaches, and the "désobligeante".
- 18 March 1682. Royal licence authorizing rental coaches to charge a 5 sol fee.
- 16th century. the "carrosse" (four-wheeled coach) appears early in the century, followed by the "coche" (suspended coach) around 1575–1580.
- 1780. Rental cabriolets replace hand-drawn and hand-carried chaises.
- 1790. The revolutionary government grants entrepreneurs freedom to do any business they like without restriction.
- 17th century. chaise à bras – an enclosed single seat carried either by two porters or pulled by a porter on two wheels. This mode of transport appeared because of the city's narrow and crowded streets – used at first by invalids or the ill, then later used by all.
- 1800. Police regimentation of all Parisian rental and public transport services.
- 1817. Return of control over public transport businesses: no public transport vehicle allowed to circulate in Paris without a special permit.
- 1828. Stanislas Baudry creates several horse-drawn Omnibus bus lines. The name comes from his first such endeavour in Nantes in 1823 – one of his bus line's terminuses was at a hat-maker's shop that went under the name of, when combined with that of its owner, "Omnés Omnibus"; Omnibus means "for all" in Latin.
- 1853. Impériale omnibus invented: the first double decker buses. The upper floor was cheaper and often uncovered.
- 16 August 1853. The government authorizes the civil engineer Loubat to construct a tram system between Alma and Iena. He had already done the same in New York one year earlier (he had actually reactivated a failed 1832 tram system).
- 1854. City engineers Brame and Flachat draw a plan to connect Les Halles to the Chemin de fer de Ceinture through an underground air-propelled railway. The line would begin at La Villette and go through an open trench until the Strasbourg station, from where it would go underground to the marketplace, and the freight would be lifted to the surface with hydraulic elevators. Five kilometres long, foreseen cost nine million francs, approved by study panel, construction announced, but project abandoned.
- 1854. The 25 public transport lines cover 150 km (93 mi) of Parisian streets. Different lines designated by a letter system then.
- 1854, February. CGO (Compagnie generale des Omnibus) created after another concession grant. They had the right to shuttle and park their buses anywhere in Paris for a 30-year period, but this delay was later extended to 56 years (or until 30 April 1910). They also were granted the right to create two new lines serving Boulogne and Vincennes.
- 8 February 1854. Napoleon III authorizes (by decree) a tramway concession between Sèvres and Vincennes with an antenna to the rond-point de Boulogne, but the only part exploited was between the place du Concorde and porte de Vincennes.
- 1855. Creation of the Compagnie Imperiale des voitures de Paris – a merger of all existing voiture (taxi) companies.
- 1855. Faster and larger two-horse omnibuses (24 seats). Inside seats cost 30 centimes and include a transfer. A seat on the imperiale costs 15 centimes, but no transfer possible.
- 1856. Loubat returns his CGO concession to the government.
- 1866. "Voiture" (non-syndicated) taxis are once again given complete freedom – anyone with a buggy can give transport services.
- 25 February 1867. Creation of the "Bateaux-Omnibus" and "Hirondelles parisiennes" companies – replaces a paddleboat service between Pont Royal and Saint-Cloud.
- 1873. first (horse-drawn) tram line opens
- 3 September 1874. Tramway between place de l'Étoile and Courbevoie opens.
- 15 June 1875. Tramway between place de l'Étoile and La Villette.
- 1890. Paris has 300 km (190 mi) of public transport (divided between the (State-Owned) CGO and the Cies de tramways Nord et Sud).
- 1897–1900. Metro planned and first line built
- 1900. first motorized trams
- 19 July 1900. first metro line opens between Vincennes and Porte Maillot (line 1)
- 1905. First combustion-driven bus line along the rue de Rennes (14 km/h or 8.7 mph).
- 1906, June. First Parisian bus line opened by the C.G.O. (Compagnie Générale des Omnibus)
- 13 December 1909. Paris's first one-way streets (rues de Mogador et de la Chaussée-d'Antin).
- 1913. Last year of service for horse-drawn omnibuses (last line running: Villette-St-Sulpice) and horse-drawn tramways (last line: Pantin-Opéra).
- 1913, January. animal traction forbidden for all Parisian transport lines
- 1920, September. Creation of the STCRP (Societé des transports en commun de la région parisienne), one company to govern all surface public transport within the department de la Seine.
- 1922. First three-colour stop light at the rue de Rivoli/bd de Sébastopol crossroads.
- 1927. Busses equipped with air-filled tires.
- 14 March 1937. last day of service for last Parisian tramway.
- 15 March 1937. Tramway line between Vincennes and porte de St-Cloud closes (123/124 (PC)). .
- 14 August 1938. Last day of service for the last tram line running in the Parisian basin (between Montfermeil and Le Raincy).
- 21 March 1948. Date of law creating the "Régie autonome des transports parisiens (RATP). State-run company takes over all Parisian public transport formerly controlled by the STCRP and la Cie du métro de Paris.
- 1960–1973. The circular boulevard périphérique expressway built.
- 1968, June. First two-floor bus (line 94) since 1911.
- 1971. Last plate-forme (open rear platform) bus circulates. RER begins construction that year.
- 1979, May. Parisian buses equipped with Radio-telephones.
- 3 May 1983. First articulated buses enter service.
- 30 June 1992. Tramway returns with new line between préfecture de Bobigny and La Courneuve. Extended to St. Denis (gare) on 21 December.
- 2007. Introduction of the Vélib' bike hire scheme.
- 2017. Proposed to test SeaBubbles water taxi.

== See also ==
- Autonomous Port of Paris
- Economy of Paris
- History of Paris
- RATP Group
- SNCF
- Tourism in Paris
- Transport in France
- Paris-Saint-Lazare to Saint-Germain-en-Laye Line
