= Fasten =

Fasten may mean:

- to join or attach, for example using a fastener or a knot
- Fasten (company), American vehicle for hire company
- Bertil Fastén, Swedish athlete
