= Trams in Paris =

Trams in Paris may refer to:

- Tramways in Île-de-France
- Transport in Paris#The Tramway
