= Hamilton Bike Share =

Bicycle-sharing system in Canada

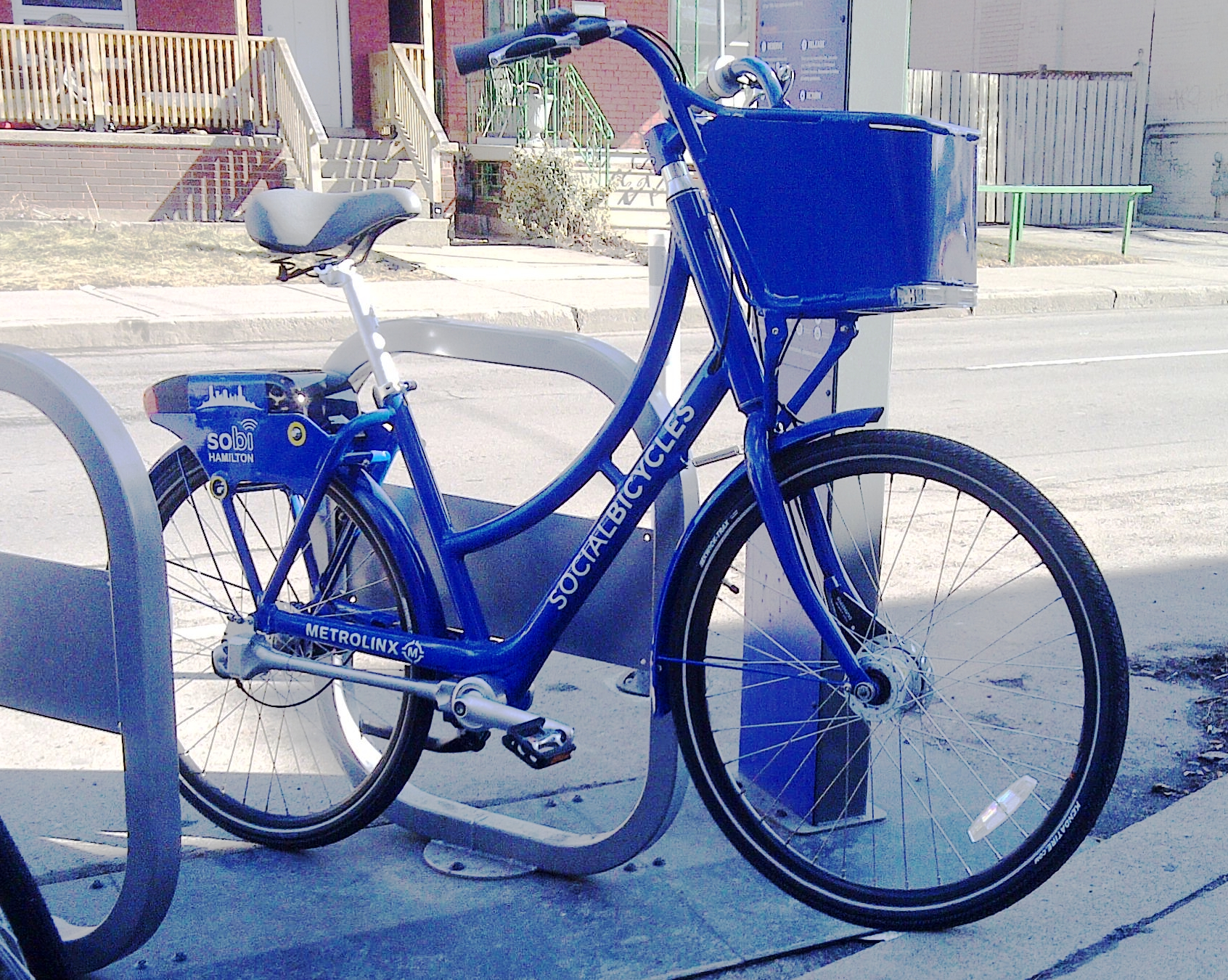
- Docked SoBi bike

Overview
- Owner: City of Hamilton
- Locale: Hamilton, Ontario
- Transit type: Bicycle-sharing system
- Number of stations: 143 (as of April 2023)
- Annual ridership: 700000 (2025)
- Website: hamilton.socialbicycles.com

Operation
- Began operation: March 1, 2015; 11 years ago
- Operator: Hamilton Bike Share Inc.
- Number of vehicles: 1100 (as of April 2025)

Hamilton Bike Share (previously known as Social Bicycles Hamilton or SoBi Hamilton) is a bicycle-sharing system located in Hamilton, Ontario, Canada. It consists of 825 bicycles at 129 hubs located in the Downtown, Westdale, Ainslie Wood and Dundas areas of the city.

The system has been operated by Hamilton Bike Share Inc, a local non-profit corporation, using equipment developed by New York–based Social Bicycles Inc.

The system closed down temporarily on June 1, 2020, after system operator Jump (later acquired by Uber) broke their contract with the City of Hamilton but subsequently resumed operations later that months after Hamilton Bike Share Inc. received $400,000 in community donations.

== History ==
In December 2013, the City of Hamilton approved the implementation of a bicycle share system, with start-up costs covered by a $1.6 million grant from Metrolinx. The system officially launched on March 20, 2015, though a limited system of 200 bicycles had already been operating since January 2015.

An expansion completed in late 2017, "Everyone Rides Initiative", added 12 more hubs, 75 more bikes, and a new system of discounted memberships for low-income residents. In June 2019, the firm added a tricycle to its fleet.

In 2020, Uber backed out of their contract with the City of Hamilton, despite being under contract through February 2021. On May 28, after 14 hours in session, Hamilton City Council decided to store all the bikes and equipment instead of funding the system's continued operation. The service was temporarily halted on June 1, 2020, until the project's initial operator, Hamilton Bike Share Inc., stepped in with funding from community and corporate donors. It resumed operation in late June.

On July 16, 2021, Cogeco announced a three-year sponsorship with Hamilton Bike Share. Stickers with the company logo were later added to bikes across the system.

In July 2021, the Portland Bureau of Transportation donated 600 surplus Biketown bikes to City of Hamilton as Portland was transitioning the system into using electric pedal-assist bikes. The bikes shared proprietary parts and technologies as the existing Hamilton Bike Share fleet, making it possible to reintegrate the bikes in a separate system and avoiding having to discard the bikes that are still in usable conditions. Their orange paint scheme was preserved and were deployed to the system in February 2023 along with old blue or white bikes.
