= Jump (transportation company) =

Former American bikeshare system

Social Bicycles Inc.
- Trade name: JUMP
- Industry: Shared mobility
- Founded: 2010; 16 years ago
- Founder: Ryan Rzepecki
- Defunct: 2020; 6 years ago
- Fate: Acquired by Lime $170M
- Headquarters: San Francisco, California, United States
- Areas served: 12 US cities, Auckland, Wellington, Berlin, Lisbon, London, Montréal, Munich, Paris, Rome, Melbourne
- Services: Bicycle sharing; Scooter sharing
- Parent: Uber (2017–2020)

Jump (stylized as JUMP) was a dockless scooter and electric bicycle sharing system operating in the United States, New Zealand, Canada, France, Germany, Portugal, the United Kingdom, Mexico and Australia. The bikes were a bright red orange and weighed 70 pounds (32 kg). Riders unlocked bikes using the Uber app and were charged to their Uber account.

Each Jump bike had a 250-watt electric motor which powered the front wheel. Jump employees swapped out the battery packs every three days. At the end of a ride, the bikes had to be locked to a sidewalk bicycle rack.

Uber acquired the company in April 2018, and expansion into European markets began in June that year. In May 2020, Lime took over the Jump business as part of an investment deal with Uber.

== History ==
Jump was founded as Social Bicycles, Inc. in 2010, and launched its bikes in 2013. By 2018 it had deployed 15,000 bikes in six countries, with users making over 5 million rides. The company rebranded as Jump in January 2018.

In February 2018, Uber reached a deal to allow riders in San Francisco to access Jump's fleet of e-bikes in the Uber app. Two months later, Uber acquired Jump Bikes for a reported US$200 million. After the acquisition, Jump's CEO announced the company was planning an expansion into Europe, which began in June 2018.

In October 2018, Jump began rolling out its scooter-sharing system in Santa Monica, California in addition to e-bikes. By then, Jump operated 4,000 bicycles across 13 cities.

In December 2018, Jump announced plans to update their bikes with new features including a front computer, improved electric-assist, and a swappable battery starting in January of the following year.

Uber transferred the Jump e-bike and scooter business to Lime in May 2020 as part of an Uber-led round of investment into Lime. In a statement, Uber CEO Dara Khosrowshahi said, "Lime has the operational expertise and undivided focus needed to build a scaled, sustainable micromobility business," and cited the move as preparing Uber for recovery after the COVID-19 pandemic had hurt Uber's rides business. After the deal, Uber destroyed thousands of old-model electric bikes and scooters due to maintenance, liability, and safety concerns.

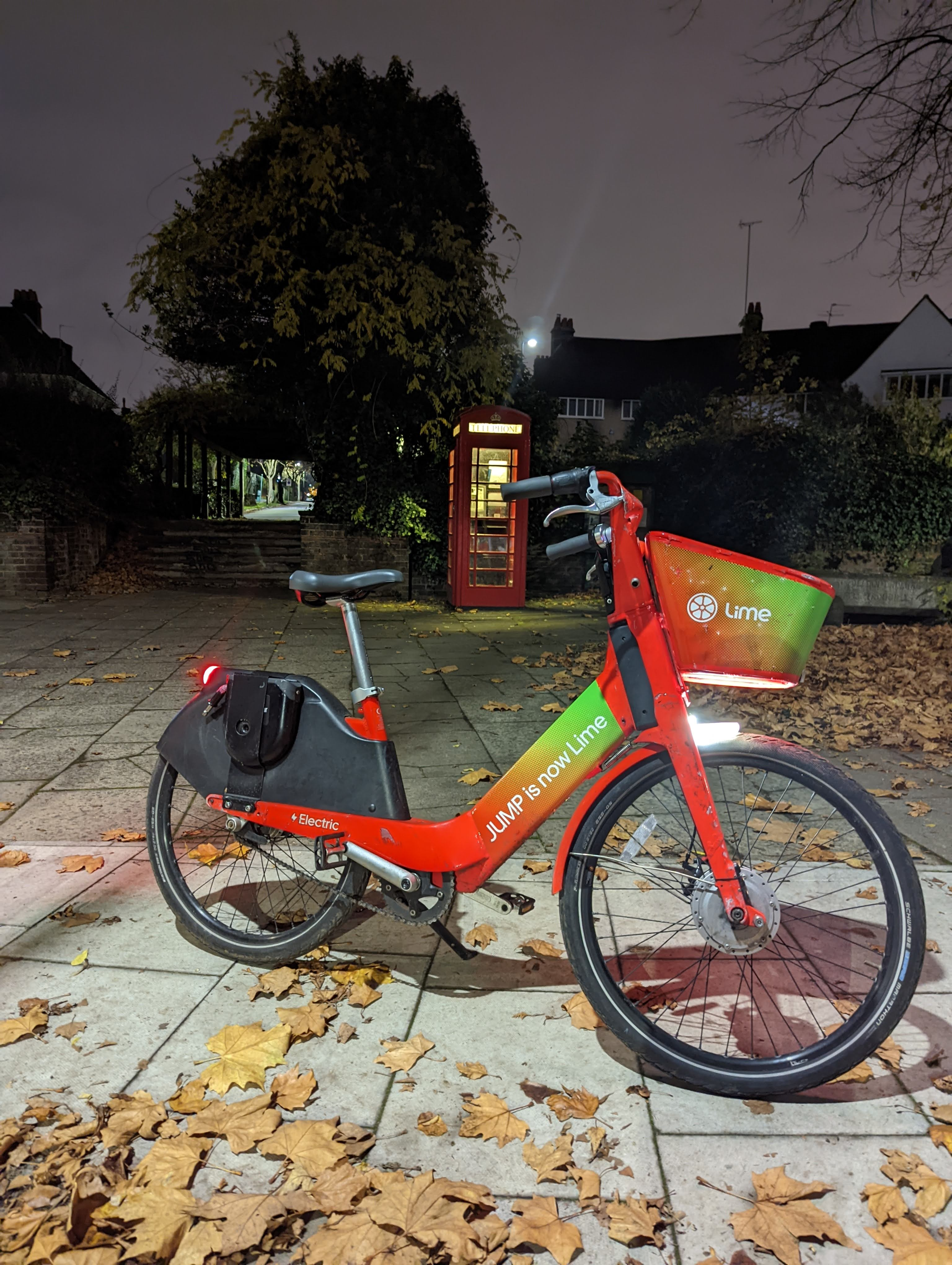
A Jump bike with a 'JUMP is now Lime' wrap applied

In June 2020, Lime re-launched JUMP bikes in many major US and European cities. This relaunch changed prices to match those of Lime's. In August, Lime officially integrated JUMP bikes into their app. This new integration now allowed for users to book a ride up to 30 minutes in advance, 15 minutes more than what was offered in the Uber app. As of September 2020, JUMP bikes are now available in both Lime and Uber apps.

== Areas served ==
=== United States ===
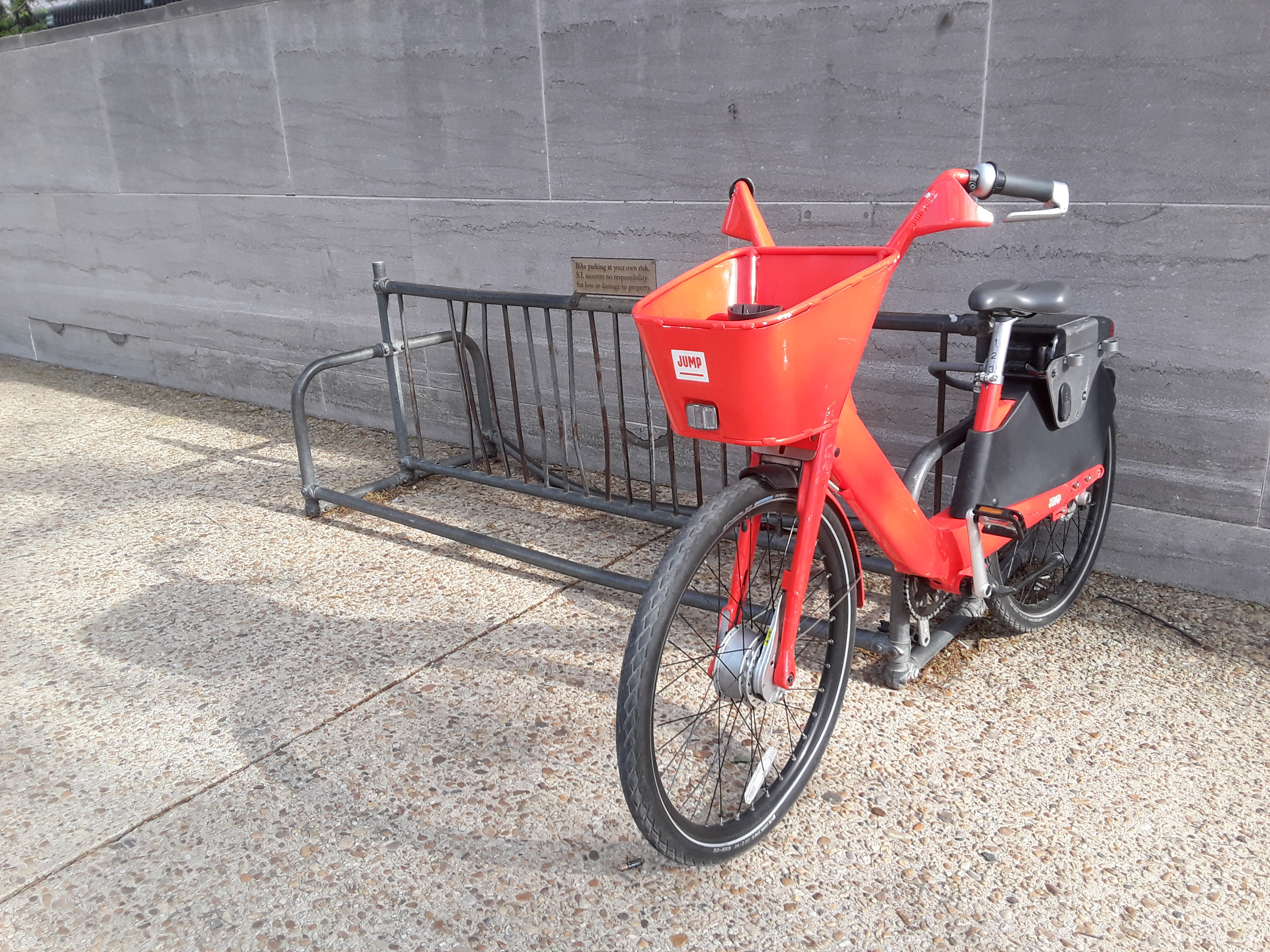
A Jump Bike docked at a public bicycle dock along the National Mall

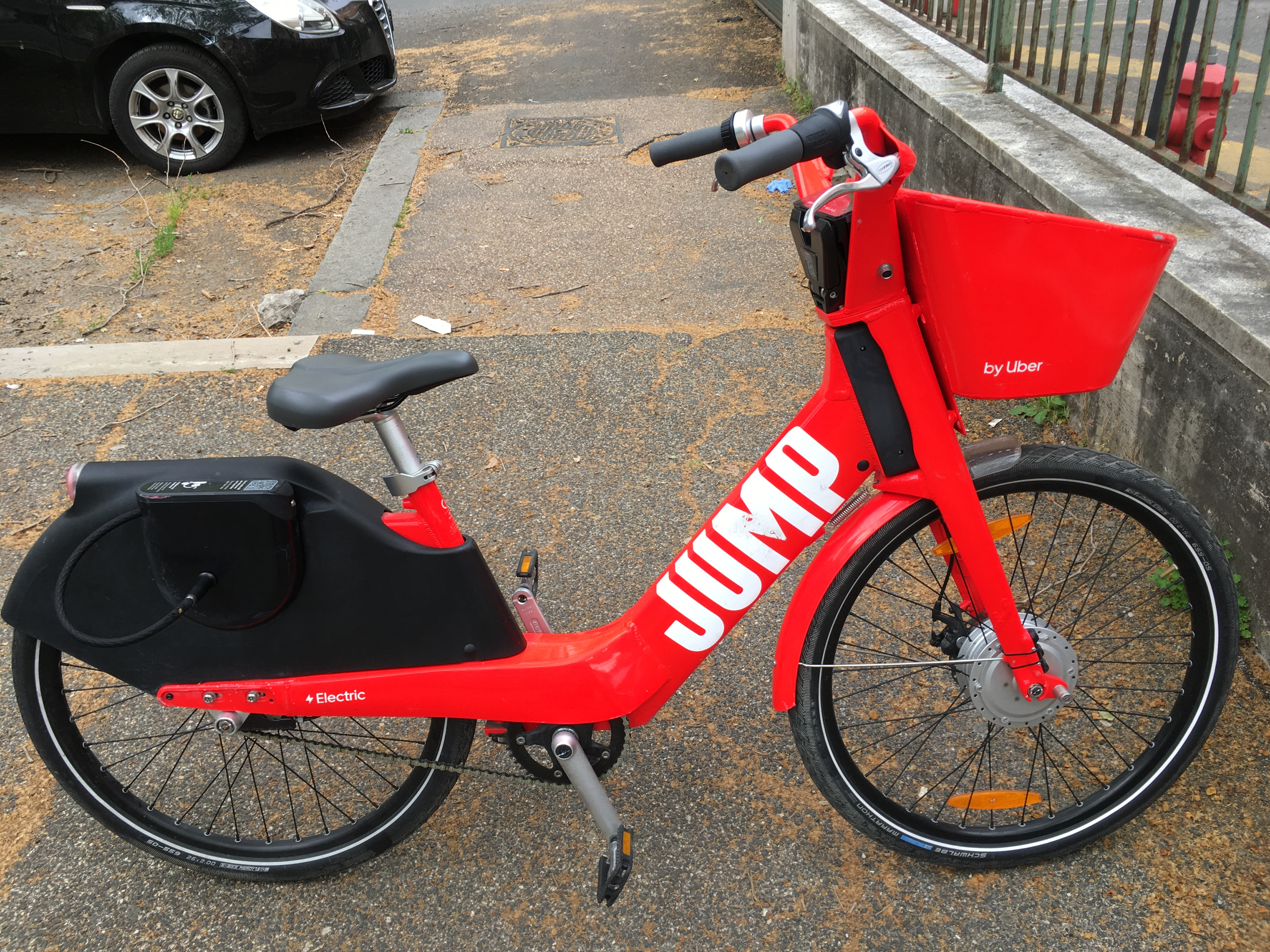
A Jump Bike in Rome, Italy

The service launched in Washington, D.C., in September 2017. This was followed by a launch in San Francisco during January 2018, becoming the first dockless bike sharing system to launch in the city. In May 2018, Jump launched in Santa Cruz, California with a fleet of 250 electric bicycles. They also launched in Sacramento, California during that month, later adding charging stations for the e-bikes throughout the city. In June 2018, Jump began a six-month pilot program with the City of Chicago, placing its dockless electric bikes in the South Side region for rental. When the six-month period concluded, Jump pulled their bikes from Chicago streets pending legislation from the city. On 2 July 2018, Jump made its Texas debut in Austin. In New York City, Jump e-bikes are available in Central Bronx and the North Shore of Staten Island as part of a dockless bike pilot program by the city which began in July 2018. In August 2018, Jump began operations in Denver.

As of September 2018, Jump has expanded the program to Providence, Rhode Island. However, the service has been suspended indefinitely following issues of theft and vandalism. The company also received permission from the Santa Monica government to roll out 500 e-bikes and 250 e-scooters in the city. In December 2018, Jump started operations in Atlanta and San Diego.

=== Europe ===
In June 2018, Jump launched its electric bike-sharing system in Berlin, Germany, marking the start of Jump's planned European expansion, under the ownership of Uber. In April 2019 it was launched in Paris, France. In May 2019, the system was launched in London. In November 2019, it was launched in Lisbon, Portugal and Rome, Italy. In November, Lime launched JUMP in Rotterdam, Netherlands. This marked the company's entry into the country. In most places in Europe, the Jump bike has been retired in favour of Lime's newer Generation 4 bike.

=== Canada ===
In September 2018, Uber announced interest in expanding Jump into the Montreal market, which would make it the first dockless bikeshare in the city.

In June 2019, Jump purchased the operational team contracts of Hamilton BikeShare, marking its first official entrance into the Canadian market. While Hamilton Bike Share's monthly and Pay as you Go members have access to 24/7 Jump team support, the Everyone Rides Initiative (ERI) subsidized low income pass program is still directly run by Hamilton Bike Share staff in the SoBi Hamilton office.

The operation of SoBi Hamilton under Jump/Uber ended on June 1, 2020, citing the impact of the COVID-19 pandemic.

=== New Zealand ===
In June 2019 Jump launched their e-scooter product into the Wellington market, competing with local scooter company Flamingo and dockless bike company Onzo. In January 2020, Jump scooters and e-bikes launched in Auckland. In mid 2020, the Auckland Council reissued operating permits, and Jump scooters and e-bikes were re-launched by Lime in September.

=== Australia ===
There are parts of Australia that are serviced by Jump vehicles. Most locations been rebranded with Lime logos (with bike frames saying formerly Jump).
