= SeaBubbles =

French company

SeaBubbles is a startup created by Alain Thébault and Anders Bringdal in 2016. They design and manufacture electric boats, called hydrofoils the size of small cars. It is proposed they could be used as water taxis in cities.

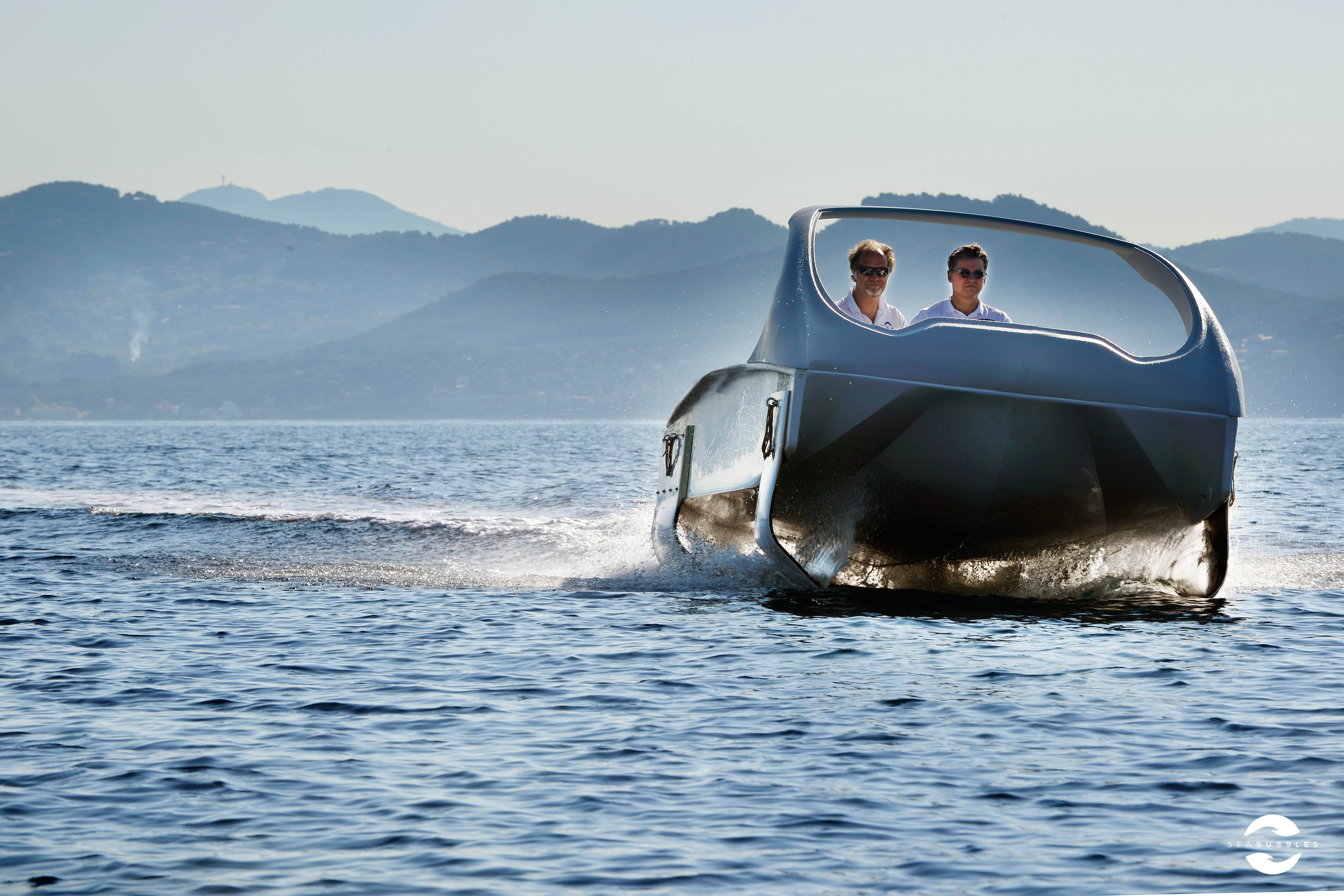
Seabubbles prototype

== History ==
Founded by Alain Thébault, designer of the world record breaking Hydroptère, who conceived the idea and Anders Bringdal, a four-time windsurfing world champion. They brought together in France a team with skills in hydrodynamic designing. Finalizing a design in 2016 for a five-person SeaBubbles water taxi.

After testing a 1/8 scale prototype, in July 2016 they raised capital of €500,000 to fund the next stage. Full size prototypes were built and tested on the Seine in Paris in 2017, operating between two landing stages. As of December 2019, 40 units had been ordered.

== Design ==
Designed to operate in a no-wake zone, the SeaBubbles rises after a few meters and reaches a speed of 11 to 15 km/h (6 to 8 kn), on four skids. This reduces water drag by 40% and increases efficiency, allowing speeds of up to a potential 46 km/h (25 kn).

The SeaBubble is powered by two electrically driven propellers attached to the rear skids. The electric power is replenished at the landing stage by using a mixture of solar panels and turbines to charge the batteries.

A full size prototype was tested in March 2017 Prototype test.

== Eco friendly ==
The Bubble is silent and as it makes no wake, it will not erode river banks. It uses electricity thus it has no emission on the trip.
