= Leap Transit =

- Founded: May 2013
- Commenced operation: March 18, 2015
- Defunct: May 20, 2015
- Locale: San Francisco, California
- Service type: Commuter buses
- Routes: 1
- Stops: 9
- Destinations: Financial District, Marina District
- Fleet: 4 buses
- Fuel type: Compressed natural gas
- Chief executive: Kyle Kirchhoff
- Website: rideleap.com

Leap Transit was a San Francisco, California premium transit provider offering bus service for several months in 2015 before being shut down for noncompliance with regulations.

== History ==
The company began operations in May 2013, running shuttle buses between San Francisco's marina and financial districts. The service was run with a single chartered 36-passenger bus, owned and operated by the charter company. Leap operated briefly in 2013; the company later characterized it as a "beta test" before obtaining more financing.

The company launched full operations in March 2015, operating four full sized buses, refurbished with new interiors. About $2.5 million in capital for its operations was provided by venture capital companies Andreessen Horowitz, Index Ventures, and Slow Ventures, as well as an investment by Marc Benioff. Buses traveled only during morning and afternoon commute periods on ten to fifteen-minute headways.

On May 20, Leap ceased operating after the California Public Utilities Commission (CPUC) issued a cease and desist notice to the company, saying it had been operating without permission from the authority, and had not provided proof of insurance, workers compensation, or compliance with driver testing. The company had been granted an "authority to operate," but not a license from the state; Leap said it believed it was operating legally, as because its service did not leave San Francisco it therefore fell under the purview of city regulations. The city, however, said it had given the CPUC regulatory authority.

On July 15, Leap filed for chapter 7 bankruptcy, and two of its buses were listed for public auction in October.
