= Fasten (company) =

American vehicle for hire company based in Boston, Massachusetts

Fasten Inc.
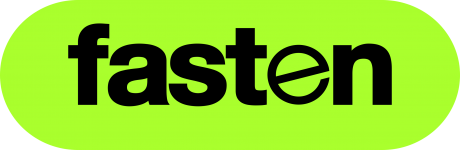
- Type: Privately held company
- Industry: Vehicle for hire
- Founded: September 2015; 11 years ago
- Founders: Kirill Evdakov; Vlad Christoff
- Headquarters: Boston, Massachusetts, United States
- Area served: Boston, Massachusetts; Austin, Texas
- Key people: Kirill Evdakov, (Co-founder and CEO) Roman Levitskiy, (Co-founder and COO); Vlad Christoff, (Co-founder and CMO) Evgeny Lvov, (Chairman)
- Revenue: USD 500,000 (2016)
- Number of employees: 89, excluding drivers (2015)
- Website: www.fasten.com

Fasten Inc. was an American vehicle for hire company based in Boston, Massachusetts. Founded in 2015, it ceased U.S. operations in 2018 and was acquired by the Vezet Group.

== History ==
Founded in 2015 by CEO Kirill Evdakov, CMO Roman Levitskiy and COO Vlad Christoff, Fasten was first launched in September 2015 in Boston. In its initial round of funding, Fasten raised $9.2 million, contributed wholly by chairman Evgeny Lvov. Using the company's mobile app, customers could send requests for rides, which were then dispatched to the nearest available drivers. Fasten emphasized that for every trip completed by a driver, the company only takes $0.99 of the fare, a lower commission compared to competing transportation businesses such as Uber and Lyft, which both take a percentage of the fare. In its first year, Fasten made a revenue of $500,000.

In its first year in Boston, Fasten mostly served college students in the Boston and Cambridge area. The company offered promotions such as $5 for any ride under 20 minutes, $3 off your first 100 rides, and free rides between midnight and 3am, with Fasten paying the difference between promotional prices and actual prices to drivers. To attract drivers, Fasten offered to pay drivers for not only the time the customer was in the car, but also for the distance and time covered when the driver was travelling to pick up their passenger. Evdakov stated that in its first year, Fasten's driver base in Boston "grew 300% quarter by quarter."

On March 2, 2018, the company announced to its riders and drivers that it would shut down all of its operations in the United States. Fasten has been acquired by Vezet Group, one of the top 10 ride-hailing companies in the world.

== Operations ==
Fasten operated through a mobile app that connected riders with nearby drivers. Riders could enter their destination and view estimated wait times, travel times, and fares before requesting either a four- or six-seat vehicle. During periods of high demand, Fasten used a feature called "boosting", which allowed riders to voluntarily offer drivers a higher fare rather than automatically applying surge pricing. Once a ride was accepted, users could view the driver's information and real-time location and contact the driver through temporary phone numbers provided by Fasten. The app also displayed fares in real time as a trip progressed.

Fasten took a fixed $0.99 commission for every trip completed by a driver. Fasten drivers could also elect to pay a fixed $20 daily fee or $80 weekly fee, pocketing in whole all fares made during this period. Drivers used their own cars, and paid for their own fuel, car maintenance, and car insurance. During the ride, Fasten offered additional and increasing levels of insurance coverage while a driver is looking for riders, was in transit to pick up a passenger, and while a passenger was on the ride. Fasten performed background checks on drivers. Evdakov also stated that Fasten requires drivers' cars to be manufactured later than 2005 for safety reasons.
