= Yet another =

Idiomatic qualifier used in the name of programs

"Yet another", often abbreviated ya, Ya, or YA in the prefix of an acronym or backronym, is a humorous prefix and idiomatic qualifier used in the name of a computer program or computing-related organization or event. It is a naming convention as a form of computer humour. Stephen C. Johnson established the naming convention in the late 1970s upon creating yacc (i.e. "yet another compiler-compiler"), named in humorous self-deprecation derived from its being merely one among others of its kind, and the name itself was directly inspired by Jeffrey Ullman's astonished comment ("Another compiler-compiler?!") uttered in response to Johnson's announcement.

Outside computing, but still within the realm of science and technology, the "Yet another" construct has been used, for instance, in astronomy, which has YAMOO ("Yet Another Map of Orion").

== Applications of the naming convention ==
The below table presents a descriptive and explanatory list of those software applications (from entire systems to system components and minor tools), organizations, data formats, businesses, among other things, which follow (or once followed) the "Yet another" convention.

Name	Yet another	Description
Y.A.S.U.	SecuROM utility	A tiny SCSI-drive protecting tool and companion program for Daemon Tools that hides emulated drives from SecuROM 7 and SafeDisc 4.
Yabasic	BASIC [interpreter]	Free and open-source BASIC interpreter for Microsoft Windows and Unix as well as for the PlayStation 2.
Yaboot	boot[loader]	Linux bootloader for PowerPC-based systems.
Yacas	computer algebra system	A program for symbolic manipulation of algebraic expressions, with its own programming language, which was designed for symbolic as well as arbitrary-precision numerical computations.
Yacc	compiler-compiler	A lookahead left-to-right (LALR) rightmost derivation parser generator developed in the early 1970s, being the first computer program to be named in this manner, which was meant to refer to the preexisting TMG compiler-compiler.
YACP	chat protocol	IRC-like protocol that powered the Adobe Community Server, a companion chat server to the 3D computer graphics platform Adobe Atmosphere.
YaDICs	digital image correlation software	A modular, featureful and efficiently multithreaded program that performs digital image correlation (DIC) on 2D and 3D tomographic images.
YADIFA	DNS implementation for all	Lightweight authoritative nameserver with DNSSEC capabilities.
YADIS	decentralized identity interoperability system	The former (or initially proposed) name of OpenID, an open-standard and decentralized authentication protocol.
YAFFS	flash filesystem	A robust and flexible filesystem designed for NAND/NOR flash memory.
YAFMS	format for mass spectrometry	A proposed format that saves data in four-table, relational, serverless database schemata, with data extraction and appending being exercised via SQL queries.
YAGO	great ontology	Free knowledgebase, automatically extracted from Wikidata and Schema.org, and developed at the Max Planck Institute for Informatics in Saarbrücken.
Yahoo	hierarchical officious (or hierarchically organized) oracle – a backronym	American web portal operated by Yahoo Inc. (90% owned by Apollo Global Management and 10% by Verizon) and established in January 1994. It provides the search engine Yahoo Search and related services, namely "My Yahoo", "Yahoo Mail", "Yahoo News", "Yahoo Finance", "Yahoo Sports", among others.
Yakuake	Quake[-style terminal] (a reference to the 1996 videogame)	Drop-down terminal emulator.
YAM	mailer	MIME-compliant e-mail client written for AmigaOS and its derivative operating systems
YAMBO code	many-body code/oracle (unofficial)	Computer software package for studying many-body theory aspects of solids and of molecular systems.
YAML	markup language (deprecated meaning)	Human-readable data serialization language commonly used for configuration files and in applications where data is being stored or transmitted.
YAML	multicolumn layout	Cross-browser CSS framework that allows web designers to create a low-barrier website with comparatively little effort. It has been integrated into WordPress, LifeType, TYPO3, Joomla, xt:Commerce, Drupal, among other CMSes.
Yandex	indexer	Russian technology company that provides Internet-related products and services, including a web browser and search engine, as well as cloud computing, web mapping and ridesharing.
YANG	next generation	Data modeling language for the definition of data sent over network management protocols such as the NETCONF and RESTCONF.
YAP	Prolog [implementation]	High-performance free implementation of the Prolog programming language, developed jointly by the universities of Porto and Rio de Janeiro, containing a Prolog engine based upon the Warren Abstract Machine (WAM) as well as several optimizations aimed at increased performance.
YAP	[document] previewer	Two separate applications capable of previewing (viz. prior to printing) respectively DVI- and PostScript-based documents.
YAPC	Perl conference	A series of conferences, started in 1999, about the Perl programming language.
YARA	recursive/ridiculous acronym	A tool primarily used in malware research and detection.
YARN	resource negotiator	Apache Hadoop's resource allocator, whose goal is efficient resource-allocation to applications. It runs two daemons: the resource manager (for tracking jobs and allocating resources) and the application master (for execution-progress monitoring).
YARV	Ruby VM	Bytecode interpreter developed for the Ruby programming language, aiming at greatly reducing the execution time of Ruby programs.
YASARA	scientific artificial reality application	Molecular visualizer and modeller, with molecular dynamics capabilities.
Yasca	source code analyzer	Free software that scans over source code in order to analyse and assert security vulnerabilities, quality, performance, and conformance to best practices.
Yass	similarity searcher	Program that searches for similarities between DNA/RNA sequences.
YaST	setup tool	A setup and configuration tool for the openSUSE operating system, as well as for commercial distributions thereof (such as SUSE Linux Enterprise) and once as part of the discontinued Linux distribution called United Linux.
Yate	telephony engine	Communications software with support for video, voice and instant messaging.
YAWL	workflow language	A workflow patterns-based workflow language supported by a software system that includes an execution engine, a graphical editor and a worklist handler.
Yaws	web server	Erlang webserver embeddedable into other Erlang-based applications and also runnable as a regular standalone server.
YDB	database	Open-source distributed SQL database management system developed by Yandex.

== See also ==
- Reinventing the wheel
