= List of Yandex products and services =

The following is a list of products, services, and apps provided by Yandex. Active, soon-to-be discontinued, and discontinued products, services, tools, hardware, and other applications are broken out into designated sections.

== List ==
Name	Description	Citation
Alice	Virtual assistant	
Ya.ru		
Yandex Afisha		
Yandex Browser	Web browser	
Yandex Cloud	cloud platform	
Yandex Direct	online advertising platform	
Yandex Disk	File storage and Synchronization service	
Yandex Eats	Online food ordering and delivery platform	
Yandex Mail	Email service	
Yandex Maps	Web mapping service	
Yandex Market	Marketplace	
Yandex Metrica	Web analytics service	
Yandex Metro		
Yandex Music	Music streaming service	
Yandex News	News aggregator	
Yandex Panoramas		
Yandex Pay	Payment service	
Yandex Search	Search engine	
Yandex Taxi	Taxi aggregation	
Yandex Timetable		
Yandex Traffic		
Yandex Translate	Multilingual neural machine translation	
Yandex Video		
Shedevrum	AI-generated images and videos	

== Discontinued products and services ==
Name	Description	Citation
Yandex Launcher	Application launcher	

== See also ==
- Yandex
