= Zen (recommendation system) =

Personal recommendations service by Yandex

- Website type: Recommendation system
- Available in: Russian
- Founded: 2015; 11 years ago by Yandex
- Owner: VK
- Key people: Anton Frolov (CEO); Rinat Nizamov (EIC); Vitaly Grigorash (CPO)
- Website: dzen.ru
- Commercial: Yes
- Registration: Optional
- Users: 59 million per month
- Current status: Active

Zen (Russian: Дзéн, romanized: Dzen) is a personal recommender system that uses machine learning technology.

It was created by Yandex and launched in 2015. In September 2022, Yandex sold the service to VK.

Zen creates a feed of content that automatically adjusts to the interests of a user. The selection of content is based on the analysis of browsing history, user-specified preferences, location, time of day and other factors.

In March 2022, the average monthly site traffic was around 59 million people.

== Technology ==
Zen is an example of the implementation of a weak artificial intelligence technology. It uses artificial intelligence to adapt to a user.

To analyze the interests and preferences of users, Yandex used information about sites that have been visited, as well as user-specified interests.

The system analyzes the user's favorite sites and other behaviors with the aim of creating a unique model of the user's preferences. With an increasing amount of data about the user, the system can offer the user more relevant and topical content, including content from sources unfamiliar to the user. Zen adapts to the changing interests of the user. For example, if a user begins to read about architecture, content on this subject will appear in their content feed more often.

Prediction of user interest by using collaborative filtering

The technology that underlies Zen was adapted by Yandex and CERN for use in the Large Hadron Collider. It is used to provide in-depth analysis of the results of physics experiments taking place at the LHС.

== Media platform ==
In 2017, Yandex announced the launch of a platform that allows companies and independent authors to publish media content (articles, photos, videos) directly to Zen. The platform also allows popular authors to earn money by using micropayment channels and ads.

In August 2021, the "Videos" section was launched in Zen. It contains videos up to 1 minute long created by Zen bloggers.

In 2021, the company paid out over 2 billion rubles to authors of publications.

Prior to the launch of the platform, Zen feeds consisted only of publications selected from publicly available sources.

After buying Zen, VK began to implement changes. In January 2023, the limit on uploaded videos was increased from 10 GB to 30 GB. In February 2023, users got an opportunity to withdraw money through the VK Pay service.

== Monetization ==
The opportunity for monetization came when, in 2017, Zen became a platform for creating content, not just distributing it. Zen-registered bloggers could get paid for their posts if they collected a minimum of 7,000 reads in a week.

In 2019, Zen paid more than 1 billion rubles to authors for placing advertisements in articles.

In May 2020, bloggers on the platform had the opportunity to place widgets with goods from Yandex Market: at that time, such social commerce was implemented only in articles. In November 2020, the platform signed an agreement with marketplace "Joom" with similar conditions for adding widgets, and in April 2021, after successful testing, placement of Auto.ru widgets became available to all authors of channels with connected monetization. The general principle of getting money from such widgets is that bloggers get paid for clicking from the widgets posted.

In March 2021, widgets began appearing not only directly in bloggers' content, but also on article cards in the feed, as well as under the articles themselves.

At the first stage of the launch of the short video feed Yandex allocated 50 million rubles to reward bloggers.

== History ==
In 1997, Yandex began research into natural language processing, machine learning and recommendation systems. In 2009, the proprietary machine learning algorithm MatrixNet was developed by Yandex, becoming one of the key components that Zen functions on. The first Yandex service to introduce the use of recommendation technology was Yandex.Music, which was launched in September 2014. This technology was then implemented in Yandex.Market and Yandex.Radio.

In June 2015, a beta version of Zen became available. At first, the Zen content feed showed only content from the media, and the service was only available to the 5% of users of Yandex Browser on Android that had registered a Yandex account. Prior to this, Zen was available in an experimental form on the webpage zen.yandex.ru.

In the following months, other types of content were added to Zen, such as image galleries, articles, blogs, forums, videos from YouTube, etc.

In 2017, Zen launched Narratives, a special content format for mobile devices. Narrative is a set of slides with texts, photos, videos and GIFs. In January 2018, the format became available to Zen authors.

In September 2022, Yandex sold the service to VK.

== Finances ==
The platform has ad-based business model. In September 2017, Zen's revenue amounted to 200 million rubles. In 2020, the planned revenue amounted to 13.1 billion rubles. According to the results of the fourth quarter of 2021, the planned revenue amounted to 18.9 billion rubles.
