= Tigran Khudaverdyan =

Russian computer scientist

- Տիգրան Խուդավերդյան; Тигран Худавердян
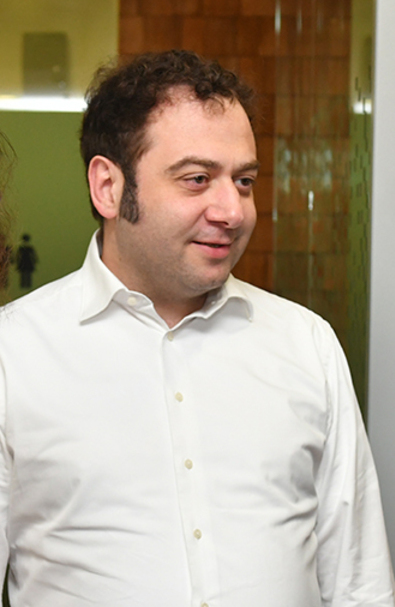
- Born: 28 December 1981 (age 44); Yerevan, Armenian Soviet Socialist Republic, Soviet Union (now Armenia)
- Citizenship: Russian
- Education: Moscow State University
- Occupation: Businessman
- Known for: Deputy CEO of Yandex

Tigran Oganesovich Khudaverdyan (Russian: Тигран Оганесович Худавердян, Armenian: Տիգրան Հովհաննեսի Խուդավերդյան, romanized: Tigran Hovhannesi Khudaverdyan; born 28 December 1981) is an businessman, former executive at Yandex N.V.

== Early life ==
Born in Yerevan, Armenian SSR in 1981, Khudaverdian graduated from the Moscow State University, physics department in 2004. Before joining Yandex, he participated in developing internet projects and headed a web studio.

== Career ==
Khudaverdyan joined Yandex in April 2006, as a project manager for portal services and technologies. Since then he has led several successful Yandex projects, including Yandex.Browser and Yandex.Navigator.

From 2009 to 2012, he was Head of Division for Portal Products and Mobile Apps. In 2012, he spearheaded the launch of Yandex.Browser, positioning it as a direct competitor to Google Chrome. Since 2012 he has been the Head of Direction for Yandex.Browser and Yandex.Taxi and has been appointed Head of Product Development in 2013.

He moved to the Yandex.Taxi business in 2015, and has been chief executive officer of MLU B.V., ride-hailing and food delivery joint venture with Uber, since its formation.

In 2016, Azerbaijan blocked the Uber-Yandex.Taxi partnership led by Khudaverdyan in the country because of Khudaverdyan's Armenian origins.

In 2019 Khudaverdyan was appointed as Deputy CEO of Yandex N.V. and joined the company's Board of Directors.

In 2020 he attended the World Economic Forum in Davos as a speaker of "Inequality: A Barrier to Economic Growth" discussion.

In March 2022, Khudaverdyan stepped down from his roles as executive director and deputy CEO due to European Union sanctions.

== Personal life ==
Tigran is married and has five sons.

== International sanctions ==
In 2014, the government of Canada included Khudaverdyan in an annex of its Special Economic Measures Act, banning him from any economic activity in Canada.

In March 2022, the European Union sanctioned Khudaverdyan as part of its package of economic penalties against Russia for the invasion of Ukraine.

He was sanctioned by the UK government in 2022 in relation to the Russo-Ukrainian War.
