= Click identifier =

Click identifier may refer to several web analytics mechanisms:

- DoubleClick Click Identifier (dclid), used by Google Marketing Platform
- Facebook Click Identifier (fbclid) used by Meta Platforms in advertising and social media analytics
- Google Click Identifier (gclid, gclsrc, wbraid and gbraid), used by Google Ads and Google Marketing Platform
- LinkedIn Click Identifier (li_fat_id), used by LinkedIn Ads
- Microsoft Click Identifier (msclkid), used by Microsoft Advertising
- Seznam Click Identifier (sznclid), used by Seznam / Sklik
- TikTok Click Identifier (ttclid), used by TikTok Ads
- Twitter Click Identifier (twclid), used by X Ads
- Yahoo Click Identifier (yclid), used by Yahoo! Japan Ads
- Yandex Click Identifier (yclid), used by Yandex Direct advertising
- Zanox click identifier (zanpid), used by Awin

== See also ==
- Query string
- UTM parameters
- Social media analytics
