= Doc+ =

Russian medical company

- Company type: Private
- Industry: telemedicine
- Founded: 2015; 11 years ago
- Headquarters: Moscow, Russia
- Area served: Russia
- Key people: Victor Belogub; Dmitry Khandogin; Ruslan Zaydullin
- Products: software
- Number of employees: 300+
- Website: docplus.ru

Doc+ is a Russian medical company that provides services in the field of telemedicine, requesting a house call by a doctor, storing and processing personal medical data. It was launched in September 2015. It works in Moscow, Moscow region, and St. Petersburg.

== History ==
The Doc+ service was launched by Victor Belogub, Dmitry Khandogin, and Ruslan Zaydullin in September 2015. Using private investments, the company launched house call service to request a doctor's visit to homes in Moscow and the Moscow region.

In July 2016 the company received 5.5 million dollars of investment from Yandex and the Baring Vostok fund, which went on expanding the list of services, marketing and access to other regions. In November 2016 the company entered the market of St. Petersburg. In December of the same year the service received the RBC Award in the category "Startup of the Year" for the introduction of an innovative model in healthcare.

On April 20, 2017 Yandex together with Doc+ launched a paid online medical consultation service, available in the "Yandex.Health" application. During the launch phase, video consultation of a GP or a pediatrician was available. Yandex is responsible for the technical part of the project, Doc+ provides doctors from its database and monitors their work.

At the end of May 2017 Doc+ launched an application that allows you to consult doctors via chat, audio, or video, and then, if necessary, request a house call by a doctor or a nurse, have tests, and receive results.

In early July, the company received another investment from Baring Vostok and Yandex for the development of IT infrastructure. At that time, the company said that the service had served more than 60,000 house calls and that there were 300 doctors in the staff.

In August 2020, Doctor Ryad Holding's Doctor Nearby and Doc + announced a merger. The merged company will be led by Denis Shvetsov. Other details of the merger have been withheld. Doctor Ryad was founded by former president of AFK Sistema and MTS Leonid Melamed and Medsi Group's former president Vladimir Gurdus.

== Business model ==
Doctors of the service can put in an IV, perform an ECG, and write a prescription. In the staff of the company there are GPs, pediatricians, neurologists, otolaryngologists, and nurses.

Doctors of Doc+ provide consultations via chat, audio or video using a specialized application developed by the company. Also GPs and pediatricians of Doc+ give video consultations within the service "Yandex.Health".

By April 2017 the service cooperated with 26 insurance companies (including AlfaStrakhovanie, Allianz, and Ingosstrakh), which include Doc+ services in their health insurance programs. In addition to this, Doc+ works with a number of clinics, for which the doctors visit the patients at home.

Doc+ declared its readiness to enter the market of telemedicine after the passage of the law on providing medical services remotely. In particular this will allow the doctors of the service to write prescriptions and make a diagnosis remotely. The company announced plans to use investments, received in 2017, to develop a unified patient's medical card that aggregates data from clinics where clients were examined and treated earlier.

== Investments ==
After launching in 2015, Doc+ attracted an investment of 35 million rubles from a group of private investors, including Florian Jansen, Managing Director of Lamoda Internet Retailer, Mikhail Sokolov, General Director of OneTwoTrip, Mikhail Tsyferov, Executive Director of Winter Capital.

In July 2016 Yandex and Baring Vostok invested 5.5 million dollars in Doc+.

In the beginning of June 2017 a new round of investments worth $5 million was announced with the participation of previous investors — Baring Vostok and Yandex. The representatives of the company and the investors did not disclose the distribution of shares after the round. However, it is known that just before the round the largest owner of Doc+ was BV Services Limited (38%), which is associated with the funds of Baring Vostok. Yandex, through the Dutch company Yandex N.V., had 6.53%. Belogub and Khandogin owned 17.56% of shares each.
