= KitLocate =

- Company type: Startup company
- Industry: Location-based technology
- Founded: 2011
- Founders: Omri Moran, Yoav Cafri, Ron Miller
- Fate: Acquired by Yandex
- Headquarters: Israel
- Products: Low-power geolocation technology for mobile devices
- Parent: Yandex

KitLocate is a startup company headquartered in Israel, delivering location-based technology solutions for smartphones. Focused on geo-tracking and mobile search results dependent on location, KitLocate's platform delivers low-power geolocation technology for mobile devices.

== History ==
KitLocate was founded in 2011 by Omri Moran, Yoav Cafri and Ron Miller. In November 2012, the founders joined the 7th wave of The Junction, the collaborative startups accelerator program, backed by Genesis Partners; they then launched a pilot product for Pango and procured their first customer: Isracard.

After working with The Junction, KitLocate joined a four-month accelerator program: Microsoft Ventures Accelerator Program in Herzlyia and as a direct result, were acquired by Yandex (YNDX: NASDAQ) on March 18, 2014.

KitLocate team members joined the Yandex mobile search team located at KitLocate's offices, which is earmarked to become the new Yandex R&D facility in ‘Silicon Wadi’ in Tel Aviv.

Omri Moran performs the role of GM for Yandex Israel R&D.

== Awards and recognition ==
In 2012, KitLocate won the first ever Israel Advanced Technology Industries and MasterCard Israel Technology Award. With prize money of $25,000, KitLocate was accepted into ‘The Junction' Acceleration program.
