= Global Fashion Group =

Global eCommerce Group

Global Fashion Group S.A.
- Type: Public
- Traded as: GFG.DE
- Industry: E-commerce; Fashion retail
- Headquarters: Luxembourg, Luxembourg
- Area served: Australia and New Zealand; Latin America; Southeast Asia
- Key people: Christoph Barchewitz (Chief Executive Officer)
- Products: Apparel, footwear, accessories, beauty, home
- Brands: THE ICONIC; Dafiti; ZALORA
- Revenue: €743.5 million (FY 2024)
- Website: global-fashion-group.com

Global Fashion Group S.A. (GFG) is a Luxembourg‑based online fashion retailer operating in 9 countries across Australia & New Zealand (THE ICONIC), Latin America (Dafiti) and Southeast Asia (ZALORA). GFG's first platform launched in 2011.

Christoph Barchewitz is the company's Chief Executive Officer.

== History ==
Global Fashion Group (GFG) was established in 2014 through a consolidation of fashion e-commerce regional companies backed by Kinnevik and Rocket Internet. Its regional companies Dafiti, Lamoda, The Iconic, Zalora and Jabong (later sold) were founded in 2011 and 2012.

In 2011 and 2012, the GFG regional companies began operations with a business model of selling inventory to customers from its warehouses.

From 2013, the GFG regional companies started creating their own private-label brands, such as Lost Ink and Zalora (formerly Ezra).

In April 2015, Romain Voog was appointed chief executive officer of GFG. He retained the role for approximately 3 years.

In 2016, GFG rolled out its Marketplace platform across key markets to complement its traditional inventory-led model.

In April 2017, GFG appointed Cynthia Gordon, a board member of Kinnevik, as the new chair of GFG Board of Directors.

In February 2018, Patrick Schmidt and Christoph Barchewitz were appointed co-chief executive officers, succeeding Romain Voog.

As of July 2019, it is now listed on the Frankfurt Stock Exchange (ticker symbol: GFG).

== Geographical operations and presence ==
GFG is registered in Luxembourg, and headquartered London, UK. Through its three regional companies, GFG currently operates across 9 markets with a total population of more than 700 million, serving a fashion market estimated to be worth over €350 billion.

Since their launch in 2011 and 2012, the three GFG regional companies have developed online fashion platforms in their respective markets.

The Group operates six fulfilment centres across its regions, including The Iconic's 19,000sqm "fulfillment center" in Australia and Zalora's Regional e-Fulfilment Hub in Malaysia.

As of 31 December 2018, GFG has more than 11 million active customers and over 10,000 employees.

=== International brands ===
In April 2017, Zalora established a partnership with Abercrombie & Fitch. This partnership will provide Abercrombie & Fitch access to more than 600 million of Zalora's online customers.

=== Private labels ===
From 2013, the GFG regional companies started creating their private label brands, with in-house design teams and collaboration with local designers. GFG private label brands include Lost Ink, Zalora (formerly Ezra), Zalia, 24:01 and Something Borrowed.

== Business figures ==
In March 2024, GFG reported Net Merchandise Value (NMV) of €1,099.6m (excluding Chile), with sales down 6.6% on a constant currency basis from 2023.

Still, on its path to profitability, GFG improved its adjusted EBITDA margin from (6.6)% in 2023 to (2.4%) in 2024. This was due to ongoing cost efficiency and Gross Margin expansion.

GFG ended 2024 with €222.4 million in cash on a net pro forma basis.

Year	Net Merchandise Value (EURm)	NMV growth (%, FX neutral basis)	Adjusted EBITDA margin	Net Pro Forma Cash position (EURm)
2022	1,461.2 (excl. Arg & Chile)	1.5%	(3.8)%	264.5
2023	1,210.1 (excl. Arg & Chile)	(13.4)%	(6.6%)	206.3
2024	1,099.6 (excl. Arg & Chile)	(6.6)%	(2.4)%	164.1

== Fundraising and M&A ==
=== Fundraising ===
In 2015, GFG raised €150 million from existing investors Kinnevik and Rocket Internet in an internal financing round.

GFG secured additional funding of €330 million from existing shareholders led by Kinnevik and Rocket Internet during H1 2016. The funding round resulted in a cash balance of €342.6 million at the end of H1 2016.

=== Acquisitions ===
In 2015, GFG acquired sports and outdoor activities e-commerce company Kanui, and kids/ baby-focused online retailer Tricae. Both deals are undisclosed and the two Brazil-based businesses have been integrated into Dafiti.

=== Strategic partnerships ===
In February 2017, GFG announced a strategic partnership with one of the Philippines’ oldest and largest conglomerates, the Ayala Group. Ayala invested to take a 49% ownership in Zalora Philippines.

=== Divestments ===
In March 2016, GFG's South American business Dafiti sold its operations in Mexico.

In April 2016, GFG's Southeast Asian business Zalora sold its operations in Thailand and Vietnam to retailer Central Group for an undisclosed amount.

In August 2016, GFG sold its Indian business Jabong to Flipkart for US$70 million in cash.

On December 13, 2022, GFG completed the sale of Lamoda's business in Russia, Kazakhstan and Belarus to Yakov Panchenko, owner of the Stockmann department store chain.

In H1 2023, GFG announced the closure of its Argentinian operations due to market challenges. This streamlined the Group's LATAM business.

In March 2025, GFG also announced the closure of its Chile operations due to post-COVID challenges and competitive pressures. The closure occurred in Q1 2025.
