= MatrixNet =

MatrixNet is a proprietary machine learning algorithm developed by Yandex and used widely throughout the company products. The algorithm is based on gradient boosting, and was introduced since 2009.

== Application ==
CERN is using the algorithm to analyze, and search through the colossal data outputs generated by the use of the Large Hadron Collider.

== See also ==
- Yandex Zen
