= Nebius Group =

Dutch technology company

Nebius Group N.V.
- Type: Public
- Traded as: Nasdaq: NBIS; Nasdaq-100 component
- ISIN: NL0009805522
- Industry: Technology company
- Headquarters: Amsterdam
- Key people: John Boynton (Chairman) Arkady Volozh (CEO)
- Revenue: ▲US$529.8 million (2025)
- Operating income: ▲US$29 million (2025)
- Net income: ▼ -US$446.7 million (2025)
- Total assets: ▲US$12,449.8 million (2025)
- Total equity: ▲US$4,613.2 million (2025)
- Number of employees: 1,371 (2025)
- Subsidiaries: Avride; TripleTen
- Website: nebius.com

Nebius Group N.V., headquartered in Amsterdam, is a technology company that provides artificial intelligence infrastructure. It is headquartered in Amsterdam, Netherlands with offices in Israel and the United States.

== History ==
The predecessor to Nebius Group was Yandex N.V., the Dutch parent company of Russian technology company Yandex, which began as a search engine in 1997. Yandex N.V. was registered as the Dutch parent company in 2007. In May 2011, Yandex raised $1.3 billion in an IPO on the NASDAQ. In February 2022, the company's securities were suspended from trading on the NASDAQ due to international sanctions during the Russian invasion of Ukraine. In July 2024, Yandex N.V. sold all of its Russian assets to a consortium of Russian investors, retaining several businesses that operated outside of Russia. This restructuring led to the creation of Nebius Group, focusing on infrastructure for artificial intelligence, with approximately over 1,000 former Yandex employees. Yandex N.V. changed its name to Nebius Group N.V., with Arkady Volozh as CEO. In October 2024, Nebius resumed trading on the NASDAQ.

In February 2026, Nebius announced the acquisition of the agentic search company Tavily for around $400 million. The same month, the company announced plans to build an AI data center in Birmingham, Alabama.

On 11 March 2026, Nvidia announced that it will invest a further $2 billion in Nebius. That June, Nebius was added to the Nasdaq-100.

== Operations ==
Nebius operates servers and data centers and provides cloud infrastructure for AI developers. In December 2024, Nebius raised $700 million through private investors, including Nvidia (which acquired 0.5% of Nebius) and Accel Partners. It operates on a prepayment model to finance AI buildouts.

Nebius owns a data center in Mäntsälä, Finland, a GPU cluster at an Equinix data center in Paris, a GPU cluster at a data center in Kansas City, Missouri, under construction, and a 300MW data center in Vineland, New Jersey, under construction.

Nebius also owns Avride and TripleTen, and has stakes in Toloka and ClickHouse. An independent company, Toloka is a former subsidiary of Yandex.
