= Lamoda =

Russian fashion retailers

- Industry: Fashion
- Founded: 2011
- Founder: Niels Tonsen, Florian Jansen, Burkhard Binder, Dominik Picker
- Headquarters: Russia
- Area served: Russia, Kazakhstan, Belarus
- Key people: Maxim Grishakov (CEO)
- Owner: Kupishuz LLC

Lamoda is one of Russia's largest fashion retailers, which includes an online platform and a retail chain.

== History ==
The company was founded in 2011.

In 2012, Lamoda entered the Kazakh market. And in 2013 it started working in Ukraine.

In 2014-2022, Lamoda was part of the Global Fashion Group (created by Kinnevik, Rocket Internet, and Access Industries). Since December 2022, the owner is Yakov Panchenko (owns the Stockmann department store chain in Russia) through JSC LM Holding.

In November 2014, Lamoda opened an office in London, launching a project to create clothing under her own brand Lost Ink.

Lamoda also entered the Belarusian market at the end of 2014. Approximately 80% of Lamoda's turnover was in Russia, 10-13% in Kazakhstan, and 7-8% in Ukraine.

According to Data Insight in 2017, Lamoda took the 2nd place in the Russian online clothing and footwear market, losing the first place to Wildberries.

In 2018, the company was ranked among the "20 most expensive companies on the Runet" by Forbes, ranking 9th.

In 2019, Lamoda rebranded and updated its logo. The new logo is entirely black, with the first two letters offset slightly.

In 2019, the company had about 380 of its own pickup points and 17,000 partner pickup points. More than 6 million products from 3,000 brands could be purchased on the marketplace.

As of 2021, the company had more than 7,000 employees.

In 2021, the company took 7th place in the ranking of the "30 most expensive companies on the Runet".

In February 2022 Lamoda suspended its operations in Ukraine as a result of Russian invasion of Ukraine

In 2023, more than 800 brands joined Lamoda, almost half of them domestic.

At the end of 2023, Lamoda launched offline stores under the Lamoda Sport brand. As of April 2024, the company included more than 90 stores throughout Russia.

By 2024, the number of products on the Lamoda online platform exceeded 10 million, and the number of global and local brands exceeded 4,000.

Also in 2024, Lamoda launched its clothing brands, which are manufactured in China and Turkey.

Lamoda took 19th place in the Forbes ranking of the "30 most expensive companies on the Runet" for 2024.

== Owners and management ==
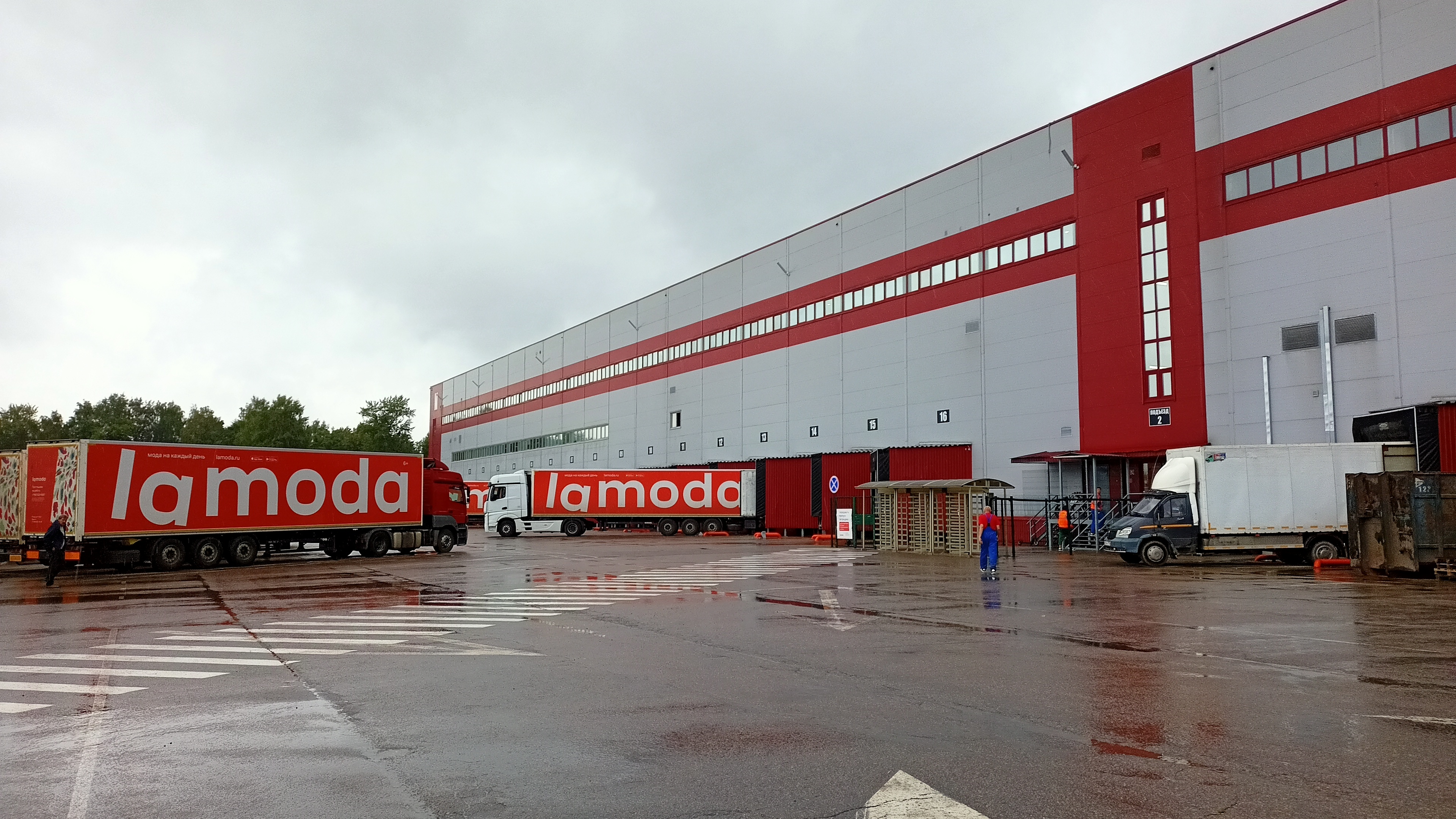
Logistics Center

The main legal entity of Lamoda is Kupishuz LLC.

Four entrepreneurs from Germany founded the company: Niels Tonsen, Florian Jansen, Burkhard Binder, and Dominik Picker.

In 2018, the founders of Lamoda, Niels Tonsen and Dominik Picker, left the company. Lamoda co-founder Florian Jansen worked at the company from its foundation to May 2020. Since 2018 he has served as CEO. Burkhard Binder also left the company in 2020.

In 2020, the company was headed by Jerry Kalmis (former top manager at VimpelCom, Tele2, and Metro Cash & Carry). Since 2018, he has been working as an independent director of Lamoda.

In 2023, Maxim Grishakov became the company's CEO (he had headed Yandex Market from 2017 to 2021 and Hoff in 2022).

== Financial indicators ==
Year	Revenue, billion rubles	Net Income, billion rubles
2015	▲1,01	
2016	▼0,302	
2017	▲27,4	
2018	▲29,7	
2019	▲33	
2020	▲37,7	
2021	▲48,5	
2022	▲61,3	10,7
2023	▲77	▼6,28
