= Yandex.Navigator =

- Developer(s): Yandex
- Initial release: March 2012; 13 years ago
- Type: Automotive navigation system
- License: Freeware
- Website: navigator.yandex.ru

Yandex.Navigator (Яндекс.Навигатор) is an automotive navigation system for mobile devices running Android, iOS and mobile operating systems of the Windows family. Developed by the international company Yandex and presented in March 2012. Yandex.Navigator is built on a technological basis Yandex Maps, supports the display of a schematic and satellite maps. According to Yandex, by August 2018, Navigator was used by 16 million users in Russia and more than four million in the CIS countries and Turkey.

== History ==
Yandex released a navigation application for cars on March 13, 2012. Navigator covered the entire territory of Russia and Ukraine (vs. Moscow and the Moscow region of the competing Google Maps) and was available on devices running Android and iOS. During 2012 Navigator added voice control and offline maps, the lack of which the technological press considered its main disadvantages. According to the results of the year, the Ukrainian IT resource ITC.UA gave it the title of the best software product of the year in the category of mobile maps and navigation. In March 2013 Navigator was included in the selection of the top 100 iOS applications according to "Technoblog Kommersant", and in November was included in the list of 10 applications with the largest daily audience in Moscow, according to TNS Russia. Yandex was the only navigation app in that ranking. In 2014, Navigator was awarded the Alternative Runet Prize in the Health and Recreation category, an award given to bright projects related to leisure, recreation and a fun way of life.

As of August 2018, according to Yandex, Navigator was used by 16 million users in Russia and more than four million in the CIS countries and Turkey. The company estimated that 60% of those who use mobile navigation choose Navigator. At the same time Yandex singled out geoservices - Navigator, "Maps", a multimedia platform for cars Yandex.Auto and a technological platform for businesses related to transport and logistics Yandex.Routing - into a separate business areas.
