= Alice AI (AI model family) =

AI chatbot developed by Yandex

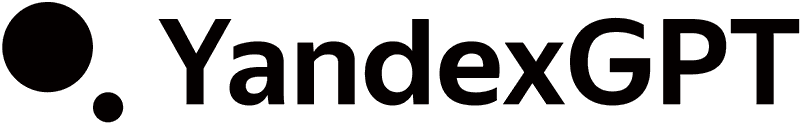
- Developer: Yandex
- Release: May 17, 2023; 3 years ago
- Stable release: Alice AI 1.0 / October 28, 2025; 11 months ago
- Operating system: Web app
- Type: Large language model (Alice AI LLM); Vision-Language Model (Alice AI VLM); Text-to-image model (Alice AI ART)
- Website: ya.ru/ai/aliceai

Alice AI is a family of generative artificial intelligence models developed by Yandex. Introduced under the Alice AI name in October 2025, the family includes a language model, Alice AI LLM, a vision–language model, Alice AI VLM, and an image-generation model, Alice AI Art. It follows the company’s earlier YandexGPT models.

The models are used in the Alice AI assistant and Yandex services, including generative answers in Yandex Search.

== Usage ==
YandexGPT and subsequent Alice AI models have been integrated into the Alice virtual assistant and other Yandex applications.

Yandex provides business access to its language models through the Yandex Cloud API, including access to YandexGPT 5.1 Pro announced in August 2025.

In June 2023, Yandex announced that business customers would be able to test YandexGPT through API access and a Playground interface from July.

== History ==
Yandex has developed a series of open-weights large language models called YaLM (Yet another Language Model).

On 17 May 2023, the company unveiled a neural network called YandexGPT (YaGPT) and enabled its virtual assistant Alice to interact with the new language model.

On June 15, 2023, Yandex added the YandexGPT language model to the image generation application Shedevrum. This enabled its users to create fully-fledged posts complete with a title, text, and relevant illustration.

In July 2023, YandexGPT launched new features enabling businesses to create virtual assistants and chatbots, as well as generate and structure texts.

On 7 September 2023, Yandex presented YandexGPT 2 at the Practical ML Conf.

From October 6, 2023, YandexGPT can create short retellings of online Russian-language videos on the Internet. It can summarize videos that are from two minutes to four hours long and contain speech.

On 24 October 2024, Yandex released YandexGPT 4 in Pro and Lite versions, available through the Yandex Cloud API.

On 25 February 2025, Yandex introduced YandexGPT 5 Pro and integrated it into Alice Pro chat. The company also published the pretrained YandexGPT 5 Lite model on Hugging Face.

On 31 March 2025, Yandex released YandexGPT 5 Lite Instruct, an instruction-tuned version of the pretrained model. The model weights are distributed under a custom Yandex licence.

On 28 August 2025, Yandex made YandexGPT 5.1 Pro available to business customers through the Yandex Cloud AI Studio API. At the time of the announcement, the model was also being used in Alice chat.

On 28 October 2025, Yandex introduced the Alice AI family, comprising Alice AI LLM, Alice AI VLM and Alice AI Art. A technical report published on 11 December 2025 described the development of the family, including the initialisation of Alice AI LLM training with Qwen3-235B weights.

In September 2026, Yandex released Alice AI Search Pretrain under the Apache 2.0 licence. According to the company, it has 35 billion parameters, approximately 600 million of which are active per token; a fine-tuned version, Alice AI Search, had been used in Yandex Search since July 2026.

On 21 September 2026, Yandex announced the release of AliceAI-Foundation-80B-A3B-Base under the Apache 2.0 licence. The experimental pretrained model uses a mixture-of-experts architecture with approximately 80 billion parameters, of which 3 billion are active per token.
