= Arkady Volozh =

Israeli and former Russian technology entrepreneur

- Аркадий Волож
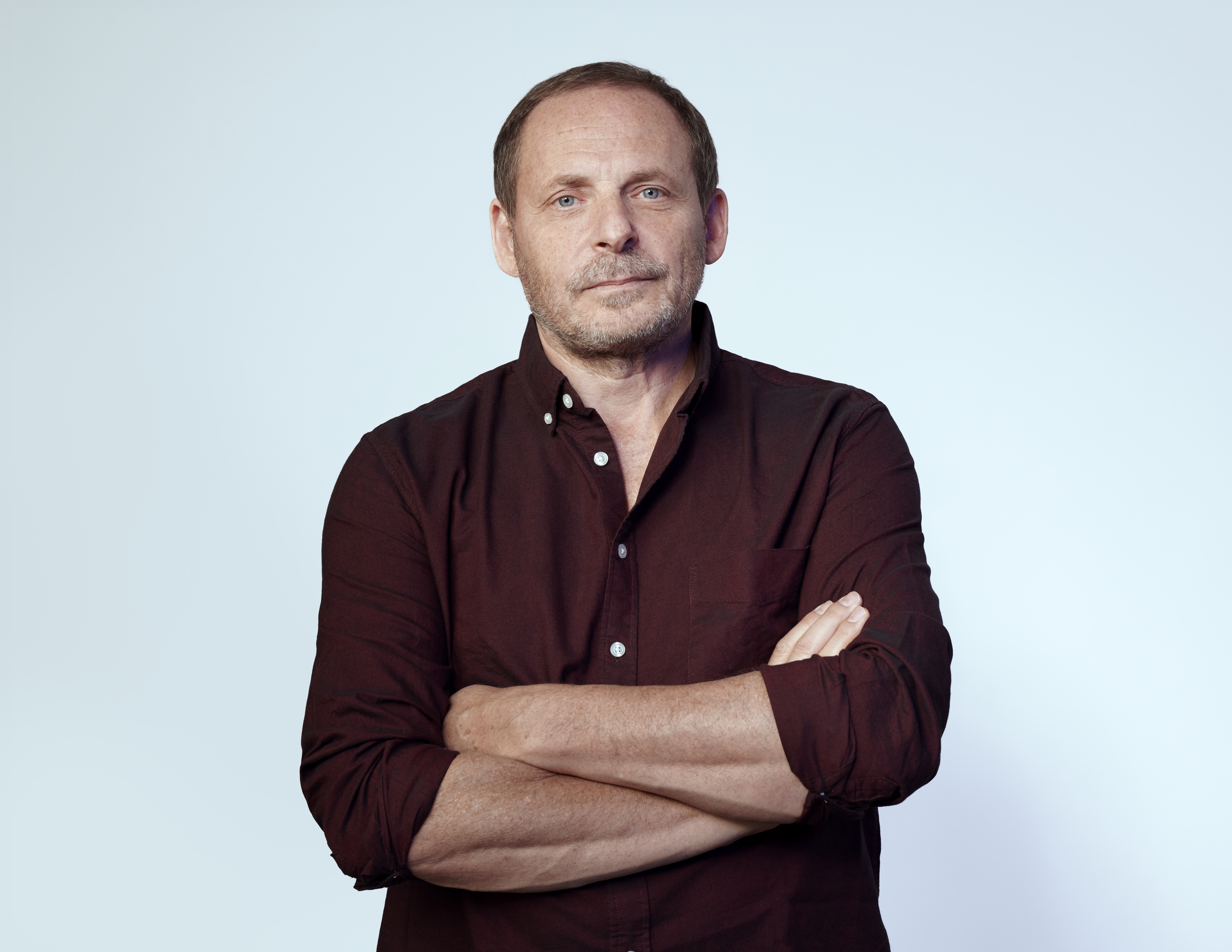
- Born: 11 February 1964 (age 62); Guryev, Kazakh SSR, Soviet Union
- Citizenship: Israeli; Maltese; Russian (until 2026)
- Education: Gubkin Russian State University of Oil and Gas
- Occupations: Businessman; technology entrepreneur; computer scientist; investor
- Known for: Co-founder and former CEO of Yandex; Founder and CEO of Nebius Group
- Spouses: Irina (m. 1980s; div.); Tosha (m. 2017)
- Children: 6

Arkady Yuryevich Volozh (Russian: Аркадий Юрьевич Волож; Hebrew: ארקדי וולוז'; born 11 February 1964) is a Kazakhstan-born Israeli and former Russian billionaire businessman, computer scientist, and technology entrepreneur. Best known as the principal founder and former CEO of Yandex, he currently serves as the founder and CEO of Nebius Group. Earlier in his career, he co-founded several pioneering technology enterprises, including CompTek, Arkadia, and InfiNet Wireless.

According to Forbes, his net worth was estimated at $6.8 billion as of July 2026, rising from approximately $1.5 billion in January 2025 following the corporate restructuring of his assets into Nebius.

== Early life ==
Volozh was born in Guryev, Kazakh SSR, Soviet Union (now Atyrau, Kazakhstan) into a Russian-Jewish family. His father was a petroleum geologist, and his mother was a music teacher. He attended the Republican School of Physics and Mathematics in Almaty, Kazakhstan, and then studied applied mathematics at Gubkin Russian State University of Oil and Gas in Moscow, graduating in 1986.

== Career ==
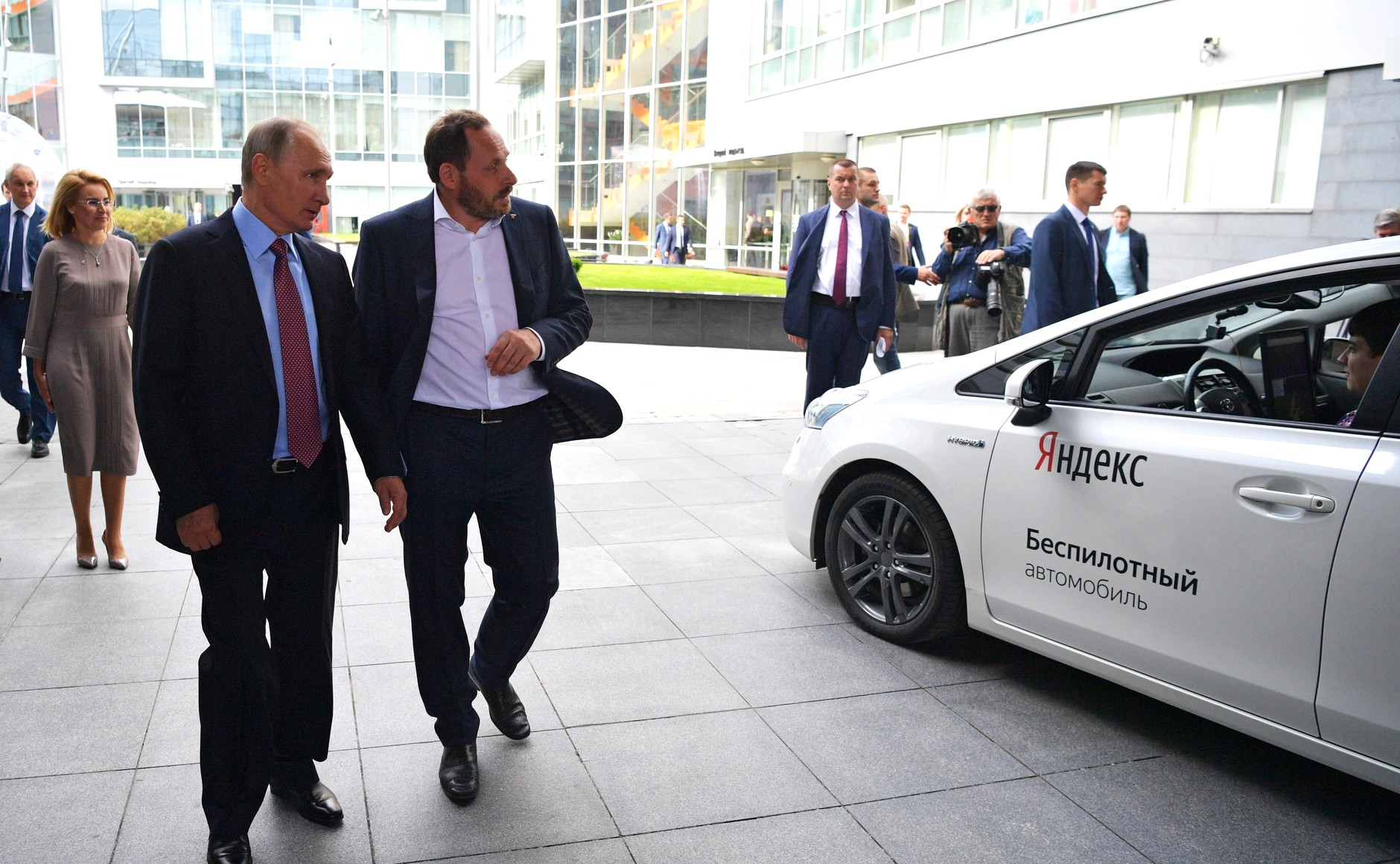
Arkady Volozh demonstrates Yandex's driverless car prototype to Vladimir Putin at Yandex HQ in 2017.

=== Early career ===
Volozh is a serial entrepreneur with a background in computer science. After working at a state pipeline research institute, he started a small business importing personal computers from Austria. He went on to co-found several IT enterprises besides Yandex, including a Russian provider of wireless networking technology InfiNet Wireless, and CompTek International, one of the largest distributors of telecommunications equipment and network hardware in Russia.

Volozh co-founded CompTek in 1989. He also started working on search technologies in 1989, which led to him establishing Arkadia Company in 1990. The company developed search software. In 1993, Arkady Volozh and Ilya Segalovich developed a search engine for "non-structured information with Russian morphology".

=== Yandex ===
Volozh co-founded Yandex in 1997, later leaving his position as CEO of CompTek International to become the CEO of Yandex in 2000. Yandex, a Nasdaq-listed company, developed and offered a variety of technologies and services under Volozh in the fields of e-commerce, navigation, mobility, autonomous vehicles, payments, music, email, and cloud computing. The Yandex IPO in 2011 was the largest tech IPO at the time after Google's in 2004. In November 2021, the company was valued at $30 billion.

As part of a larger effort to spread machine learning, Volozh and the Yandex team established the Yandex School of Data Analysis in 2007, offering a free master's level program in data science. That same year, he helped establish and subsequently headed the Department of Data Analysis at the Moscow Institute of Physics and Technology (MIPT).

In June 2022, after the Russian invasion of Ukraine, the EU imposed sanctions against Volozh, prompting him to resign from all positions at Yandex. The reasons cited by the EU for sanctioning Volozh were his status as a "leading businessperson involved in economic sectors providing a substantial source of revenue to the Government of the Russian Federation", Russian state-owned banks being shareholders and investors in Yandex, the Russian Federation having a veto over the "sale of material IP and the sale or transfer of Russian users' personal data to foreign companies", and allegations of the search engine promoting state narratives. These reasons were called "poor and dubious" by Anders Åslund, and Gerhard Mangott commented that "it is hard to understand what Volozh is being accused of." Yandex argued that it had no choice but to follow Russia's strict censorship laws, and the company sold its news service soon after the invasion. In contrast to the EU that year, the United States and the United Kingdom never sanctioned Volozh.

In August 2023, Volozh announced that he was "totally against Russia's barbaric invasion of Ukraine, where I, like many, have friends and relatives. I am horrified by the fact that every day bombs fly into the homes of Ukrainians." He also stated that although he moved to Israel in 2014, he has to take his share of responsibility for Russia's actions. By the time of his announcement, Volozh was only the second sanctioned Russian businessman to take a stance against the invasion. In January 2025, Volozh stated that it took 18 months to issue a statement on the war because he first needed to relocate 1,000 Yandex employees who wanted to leave Russia.

In March 2024, Volozh was removed from the EU sanctions list. In July 2024, the Dutch holding company Yandex N.V. completed the full divestment of its Russian assets for $5.4 billion, marking the largest corporate exit from Russia following the invasion.

=== Nebius Group ===
In July 2024, the remaining non-Russian assets of Yandex N.V. were reorganized as Nebius Group, and trading on Nasdaq resumed on 21 October 2024 under the ticker NBIS. Volozh refocused Nebius on building a cloud platform for companies developing artificial intelligence products. In September 2025, Nebius signed a contract with Microsoft worth up to $19.4 billion, and another with Meta worth up to $27 billion in March 2026. That month NVIDIA also took a $2 billion equity stake as part of a strategic partnership. As of May 2026, Nebius had a market capitalization of approximately $50 billion, with Volozh holding an economic interest of around 11%.

== Life in Israel ==
In 2014, following the Russian annexation of Crimea, Volozh moved to Tel Aviv, Israel, where he lives with his family. His parents also moved to Israel the same year. Volozh's connection to Israel began earlier; from 2010 to 2012 he served as a board member of Face.com, an Israeli facial-recognition company which was sold to Facebook in 2012. Volozh was also an investor in the company. From 2015 to 2020 he served on the board of NeuroSteer, an Israeli medical technology company specializing in brain signal processing. He later oversaw the rollout of several tech services in Israel, establishing a local office and an R&D center. In a 2019 interview, Volozh described Israel as an attractive hub due to its human talent and strategic role in the global tech economy. Volozh also frequently participates in professional technological conventions and forums in Israel.

According to Agentstvo, the website of Volozh described him as "a Kazakhstan-born, Israeli tech entrepreneur, computer scientist, investor, and philanthropist" and did not mention his Russian background. Yandex was described as "one of the largest internet companies in Europe" and its Russian origins were not mentioned. Kyiv Post, citing Wikiganda, argues that Volozh deleted some elements related to his past life in Russia on his Wikipedia page.

== Personal life ==
Volozh married his first wife, Irina, in the 1980s while studying at university; the couple had three children before divorcing. In 2017, he married Tosha in Zikhron Ya'akov, Israel; they have three children together, having six children in total.

In 2016, Volozh acquired Maltese citizenship through its individual investor program. He resides in Tel Aviv with his family and holds Israeli citizenship. In October 2022, a residential property owned by Volozh in Amsterdam was occupied by squatters following the EU sanctions imposed against him; an Amsterdam district court later ruled that the squatters could remain due to sanctions restrictions preventing the renovation of the site.

In February 2024, the Council of the European Union decided not to renew sanctions against Volozh. In February 2026, Volozh completed the formal process of renouncing his Russian citizenship.

His eldest son, Lev, is the founder of MoscowFresh and a former manager at Yandex Taxi. His son Timofey is a New York-based jazz drummer who has organized and performed at benefit concerts supporting Ukraine since March 2022. His daughter Anna-Ester is an LGBTQ campaigner and animator based in London, heading the Dragonbee studio. Commenting on his children's civic and personal choices in contrast with the Kremlin establishment, an acquaintance noted in an interview that "when the EU put Arkady on the sanction list, the Kremlin must have had a huge laugh."
