= Face.com =

Israeli facial recognition technology company

- Industry: Technology
- Founded: 2009
- Defunct: June 18, 2012
- Fate: Acquired by Facebook
- Headquarters: Tel Aviv, Israel

Face.com (Hebrew: פייס.קום) was an Israeli technology company that developed a platform for efficient and accurate facial recognition in photos uploaded via web and mobile applications. Face.com apps and API services scanned billions of photos monthly and tagged faces in those photos, tying them to social networking information. As of February 2011, the company had "discovered" 18 billion faces across its API and Facebook applications.

The company was established in 2009 in Tel Aviv, and maintained an office with 10 employees. Face.com developed and released two Facebook applications: Photo Finder and Photo Tagger. Photo Finder allowed users to find untagged pictures of themselves as well as friends on Facebook and then tag those photos. Photo Tagger enabled bulk-tagging of faces that appear in multiple photos uploaded to the Facebook website. On June 18, 2012, the company announced that it had been acquired by Facebook. It was also announced that they were winding up their API's to focus on new Facebook products.

== REST API Program ==
In March 2010, Face.com opened an Alpha of their free REST API, allowing third-party developers to integrate the Face.com facial recognition technology, algorithms, and database of tagged faces with their own apps and services. The REST API gave developers free access to all of the platform's technology, with some applicable rate limits, while also offering white listing and premium licensing options. With the API, developers could tag and recognize users from Facebook and Twitter, attach Face.com technology to their own index of images, or even mix and match facial recognition across photo sources, including Facebook, Twitter, Flickr, Picasa, and more.

In February 2011, Face.com's API program moved from Alpha to Beta, increasing the rate limit from 200 scanned photos per hour to 5,000 photos per hour. As of February 10, more than 10,000 developers were using the Face API.

== Funding ==
Face.com raised a total of $5.3 million in funding for their face recognition technology. A Series A round, totaling $1 million, was raised in February 2009. On September 27, 2010, the company announced that it had closed a Series B round of $4.3 million, led by previous investor Rhodium and Russia-based investor Yandex. On June 18, 2012, the company was acquired by Facebook for an undisclosed sum estimated to be between $55 and $60 million.

== University of Massachusetts study ==
In 2011, a study conducted at the University of Massachusetts Amherst compared a portion of the Face.com algorithm, and found it to have a recognition rate of 0.91.

== Update ==
As of June 2012 Face.com was sold to Facebook. The Technology is continued under the project DeepFace. As of December 2015 the domain Face.com was sold to an e-commerce company.
