= Joom =

Latvian e-commerce marketplace

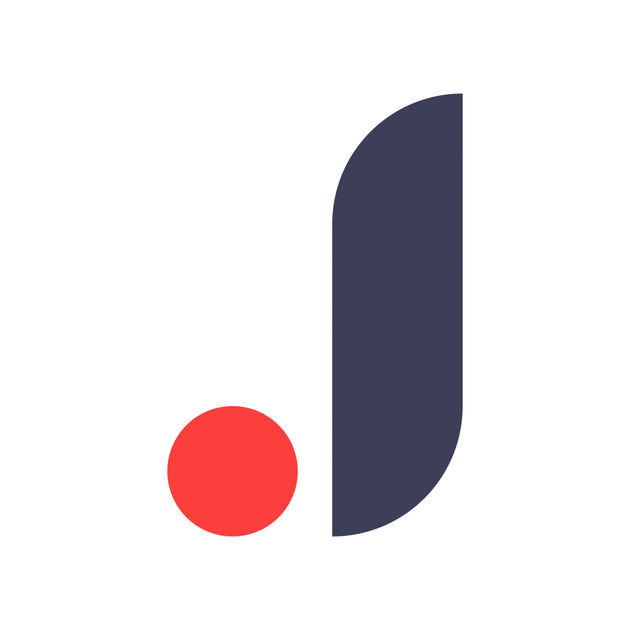
- Industry: E-commerce
- Founded: June 2016
- Founders: Ilya Shirokov
- Headquarters: Portugal, Lisbon
- Number of employees: 400 (2025)
- Website: about.joom.com

Joom is a group of e-commerce companies founded in Latvia in 2016 and headquartered in Lisbon, Portugal. It also has offices in China, Hong Kong, Brazil, the USA, Germany and Latvia. As of 2025, Joom consists of the following business units.

== Overview ==
=== Joom Marketplace ===
Joom Marketplace is an e-commerce platform and mobile app that sells products from Asia and Europe. It was launched in 2016 in Riga, Latvia.

Joom's app was launched in France, Spain, Germany in 2017. Joom was the most downloaded shopping app in Europe for 2018 with more than 56 million installations.

By the end of 2020, the app Joom has been downloaded 150 million times in the European region.

The platform is known to be mobile-first with around 83% of transactions being made on mobile, according to Mediametrie, a media and reference studies French company.

In 2021, Joom joined the Product Safety Pledge initiative, which is an agreement to cooperate with the EU Member States to remove dangerous products from its websites.

As of the beginning of 2022, Joom had over 400 million users worldwide across iOS, Android, and the Web. The marketplace had 25 million monthly active users and 20 million active buyers.

Joom became one of the first platforms that resumed the delivery of goods to Ukraine after the beginning of the Russian invasion of Ukraine.

=== JoomPro ===
In 2021, Joom launched JoomPro, a business-to-business (B2B) platform for importing goods from China. As of 2025, JoomPro operates in Brazil and Mexico. In September 2023, Joom announced a US$50 million investment to expand JoomPro's operations in Brazil through 2028. The Brazilian platform launched in April 2024.

=== JoomPulse ===
JoomPulse is an AI-powered analytics platform for sellers on Mercado Livre, providing analytics on product demand, categories and competitor pricing.

=== JoomAI ===
JoomAI is an artificial intelligence service developed by Joom Group for marketplace sellers. It was launched in Brazil in July 2026, with Brazil serving as its first market. The service provides tools for monitoring competitors, analysing prices, identifying sales opportunities and supporting commercial decision-making. At launch, JoomAI included around 100 specialized AI agents for tasks such as market analysis, competitor monitoring and identifying pricing opportunities. It can be used independently or integrated with JoomPulse and JoomPro.

=== Onfy ===
Onfy is a pharmaceutical marketplace available for customers in Germany. It was registered in 2021 as Joom Pharm Solutions GmbH and launched in 2022 as Onfy. Onfy's headquarters are located in Berlin.
