= Yandex Cloud =

Cloud-based service and infrastructure

- Website type: Cloud computing
- Available in: Russian, English
- Owner: Yandex
- Website: yandex.cloud
- Commercial: Yes
- Registration: Required
- Current status: Active

Yandex Cloud is a public cloud platform developed by the Russian internet company Yandex. Yandex Cloud provides private and corporate users with infrastructure and computing resources in an ‘as a service’ format.

== History ==
Yandex's plans to enter the public cloud market have been known since 2016, but the first news about the development of the service appeared in 2017 when Yan Leshchinsky, who had previously worked on cloud platforms at Microsoft, Salesforce and AWS, joined the company. Closed testing of Yandex Cloud began in April 2018 with the participation of over 50 large Russian and international companies, including Tinkoff Bank, X5 Retail Group, S7 and Skyeng. The platform was presented in a technical preview in September 2018. The user base and revenue of the platform grew consistently, so in October 2020, Yandex moved Yandex Cloud from an experimental direction to an independent business unit.

== Structure ==
The Yandex Cloud platform uses the same infrastructure as the main Yandex services and is located in the same data centers. Many Yandex Cloud components are based on the company's internal tools, originally developed for in-company use. Open-source software is also used: KVM for the hypervisor, Tungsten Fabric (OpenContrail) for software-defined networking, etc. As the first Russian partner of Nvidia GPU Cloud (NGC), Yandex Cloud provides access to specialized applications which are optimized for Nvidia GPUs[6] for working with artificial intelligence, machine learning, neural networks and high-performance computing.

== Services ==
Yandex Cloud includes infrastructure and data management services, tools for developing cloud applications and machine learning models, as well as proprietary ML-based services:

Infrastructure and Network

- Compute Cloud (VMs and disks)
- Object Storage (scalable data storage)
- Cloud Interconnect (dedicated network connections)
- API Gateway (integration with Yandex Cloud services via the API)
- Network Load Balancer
- Application Load Balancer
- Virtual Private Cloud (cloud network management)
- DDoS Protection
- Сloud DNS (domain name management)

Data Platform

- Yandex Managed Service (MS) for PostgreSQL
- MS for ClickHouse
- MS for MySQL
- MS for Redis
- MS for MongoDB
- MS for Elasticsearch
- MS for Apache Kafka.
- MS for SQL Server
- MS for Greenplum
- Data Proc (Apache Hadoop cluster management)
- Data Transfer (database migration)
- Message Queue (queues for messaging between applications).

Container-based Development

- Managed Service for Kubernetes (Kubernetes cluster management)
- Container Registry (docker image management)

Serverless Computing

- Cloud Functions (running code as a function)
- Database (distributed, fault-tolerant NewSQL DBMS)
- Yandex IoT Core (Internet of Things solutions)

Security

- Key Management Service (encryption key management)
- Certificate Manager (TLS certificate management)
- Lockbox (creation and storage of confidential information)

Resources and Management

- Monitoring (gathering and visualization of metrics)
- Identity and Access Management (for cloud resources)
- Resource Manager (for catalogues and clouds)

Machine Learning

- DataSphere (development of ML models)
- SpeechKit (speech recognition and synthesis)
- Translate (machine translation supporting over 90 languages)
- Vision (image analysis with ML models)
- Brand Voice Call Center (speech synthesis to create unique voices of virtual call center operators)

Business Tools

- Tracker (teamwork organization)
- DataLens (data analysis and visualization)

== Security ==
Yandex Cloud complies with the requirements of ISO/IEC information security standard 27001:2013 and is the first cloud platform in Russia and the CIS countries to be certified in accordance with the information security standard ISO/IEC 27017:2015 and the standard for the protection of personal data ISO/IEC 27018:2019, which take into account the specifics of cloud services.

Yandex Cloud's hardware base is located in the same data centers as Yandex's other services, but physically separated by hardware firewalls. Inside Yandex Cloud, a HIPS is used, and ACL access control is applied at the top-of-rack switch level. For virtual machines, the QEMU/KVM assembly is used with a minimum set of code and libraries, and all processes are launched under the control of AppArmor.

The platform complies with the requirements of the European Union's GDPR and ensures the level of protection of personal data according to Russian Federal Law No. 152 "On Personal Data" up to Security Level 1, complies with the GOST R 57580 security standard established by the regulations of the Bank of Russia. Yandex Cloud is also the first public cloud in Russia that has confirmed compliance with the PCI DSS standard for all categories of services: IaaS, SaaS, PaaS and serverless computing.

== Management and Financial Indicators ==
Yan Leshchinsky became the first head of Yandex Cloud. In June 2020, he was replaced by Alexey Bashkeev, who had previously led the development of cloud infrastructure for Yandex's own services, including those that later became components of Yandex Cloud. By the beginning of 2021, Yandex Cloud was serving 9700 commercial customers (a 1.4X increase), including 270 large companies, providing about half of its 1 billion RUB revenue. 60% of revenue came from infrastructure services, followed by ML (14%) and data technologies (12%).
