= Yandex Browser =

Web browser developed by Russian company Yandex

- Developer: Yandex
- Release: 1 October 2012; 14 years ago

Stable release(s)
- Windows: 26.4.0.2209 / 26 May 2026; 5 months ago
- Android: 26.4.4.115 / 25 May 2026; 5 months ago
- iOS: 26.4.5.511 / 20 May 2026; 5 months ago
- macOS: 26.4.0.2209 / 26 May 2026; 5 months ago
- Written in: C++, JavaScript
- Engine: Blink
- Operating system: Windows 7 or later; macOS 10.15 or later; Android 5.0 or later; iOS 11.0 or later; Linux x64
- Platform: ARM, IA-32, x86-64
- Available in: 14 languages
- List of languages English, Czech, French, German, Italian, Japanese, Kazakh, Portuguese, Russian, Simplified Chinese, Spanish, Turkish, Ukrainian, Uzbek.
- Type: Web browser
- License: Freeware
- Website: browser.yandex.com

Yandex Browser (Russian: Яндекс Браузер) is a freeware web browser developed by the Russian technology corporation Yandex, that uses the Blink web browser engine and is based on the Chromium open source project. The browser checks webpage security with the Yandex security system and checks downloaded files with Kaspersky Anti-Virus. The browser also uses Opera Software's Turbo technology to speed web browsing on slow connections.

The browser is available for Windows, macOS, Linux, Android and iOS.

The browser is the second most popular desktop web browser (the third as a mobile browser) in Russia at 38.05%, while it is less popular in most other countries, e.g. in Kazakhstan third at 9.5% and globally ranks ninth at 0.4% after UC Browser (which is eighth at 0.63%).

== Distinguishing features ==
Distinguishing features of the Yandex Browser include the following:

- Different "new tab" screen with a Windows 8-style interface and specialized widgets for popular services (e.g., the gmail widget shows number of unread messages).
- Integrated keyboard layout switcher in omnibox: e.g., if a user often uses gmail.com and starts typing "пьф" ("gma" with Russian keyboard layout) and presses Enter, the user will then be taken to gmail.com and not to the search page for "пьф" (as is the case in Chrome, for example).
- On Android it provides ability to install chrome extensions on a mobile browser.
- Supports browser extensions from the Opera add-ons website.

== Security ==
=== DNS spoofing protection ===
Protect active security technology scans files and website for viruses, blocks fraudulent webpages, protects passwords and bank card details, and keeps online payments safe from theft.

=== DNSCrypt ===
Yandex Browser was the first browser to implement DNSCrypt technology, which encrypts Domain Name System (DNS) traffic. For example, it protects from a trojan DNSChanger, a tracking Internet provider, or hackers. This option must be enabled in the browser settings.

=== Protecting Wi-Fi ===
When connecting to open Wi-Fi networks or access points that use a weak WEP-defense, Yandex Browser encrypts data to and from a Yandex server. The Yandex server acts as a channel between the browser and the HTTP sites.

=== Privacy concerns ===
According to Douglas J. Leith, a computer science professor at Trinity College, Yandex Browser not only sends a hashed hardware identifier to Yandex, but also every letter typed in the address bar and every URL visited by the user. Yandex Browser along with Microsoft Edge, were ranked least private among the tested browsers.

== Company background ==
Yandex was created by Ilya Segalovich and Arkady Volozh while working for Arcadia in 1993. It was named Yandex as an abbreviation for Yet Another Indexer. They named it Яndex, using Я as a shortened version of Ya. Yandex was unveiled on September 23, 1997. At that point it had indexed the entirety of the Russian internet. The following year, Yandex began showing advertisements. Their first advertisement said, "Ваша киска купила бы Cisco," meaning, "Your kitty would buy Cisco." In the year 2000, Yandex was registered as a company. Volozh became the CEO. In 2001, Yandex started to place advertisements directly into pages themselves. 2500 advertisers joined. A year later, the company became profitable. That same year, Yandex.Images and Yandex.Market started. Later that year, Yandex.money (a payment system) started jointly with the PayCash group. In 2003, Yandex started issuing dividends. That year, they issued $100,000 of dividends. Yandex also changed their advertisement system to a pay-per-click model. In 2004, Yandex.Maps started. They had detailed maps of Moscow, Saint Petersburg, and Kyiv. It could not be used to search for addresses, just establishments. That year, Yandex created a separate search engine for blogs, that no longer exists.

== Market share ==
According to LiveInternet analytics, Yandex Browser reached 2.3% market share in Russia two months after its release. As of June 2022, Yandex Browser held 16.47% market share in Russia.

Yandex is facing web search competition in Russia from Google Search. Google Chrome, Russia's most popular web browser, uses Google Search as its default search engine. In June 2012, Mozilla Firefox, the world's third most popular web browser, signed a deal to replace its default search engine Yandex Search with Google Search. As Yandex Browser's "Smartbox" uses Yandex Search as its default search engine, the browser will help Yandex compete for Russian search market share.
