= Ilya Segalovich =

Russian businessman (1964–2013)

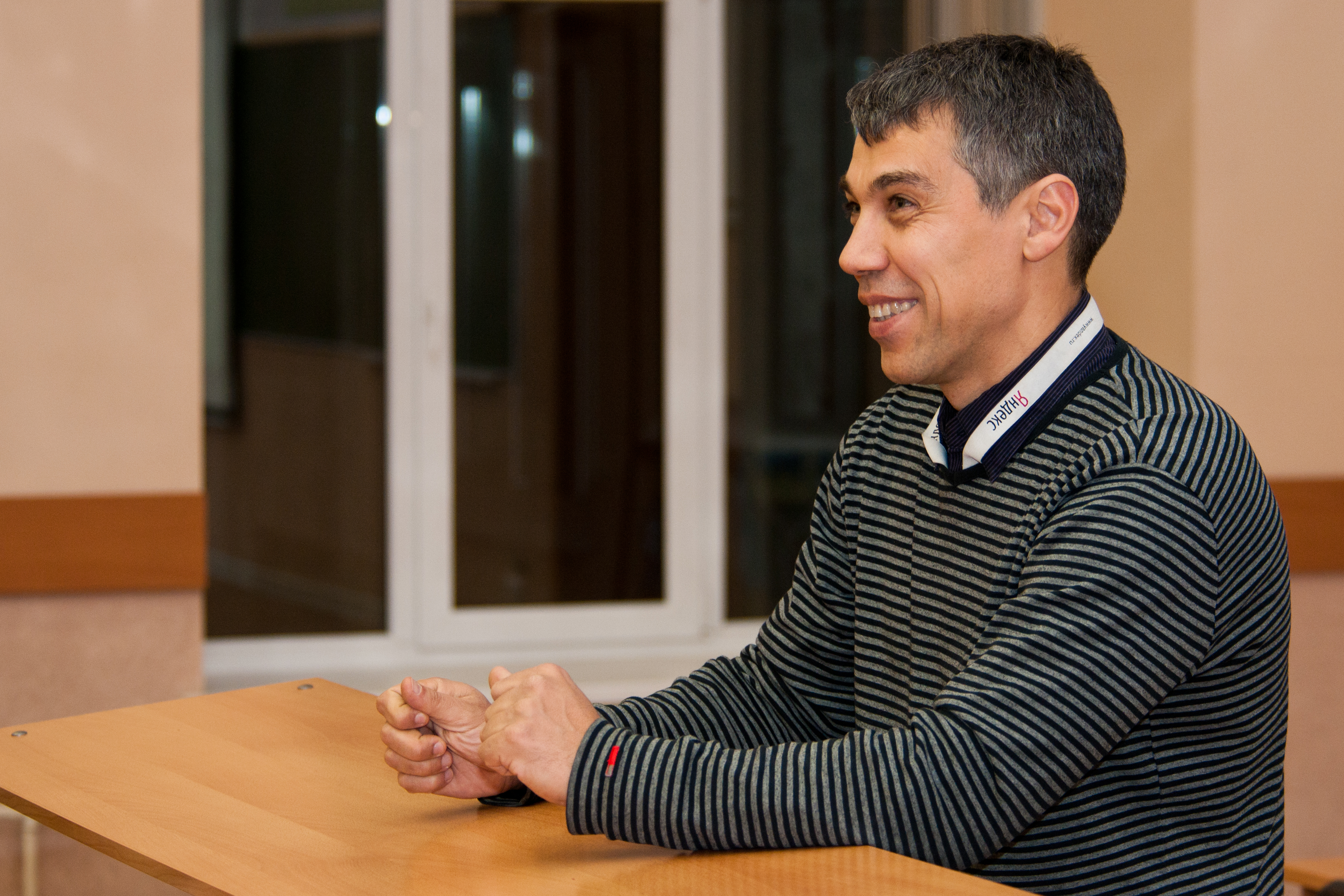
- Segalovich in 2010
- Born: Russian: Илья Валентинович Сегалович; 13 September 1964; Gorky (Nizhny Novgorod), RSFSR, Soviet Union
- Died: 27 July 2013 (aged 48); London, England, United Kingdom
- Occupations: Programmer, CTO
- Known for: Co-founder of Yandex

Ilya Valentinovich Segalovich (13 September 1964 – 27 July 2013) was a co-founder of Russian company Yandex. He was CTO and director of Yandex since 2000 until his death in 2013. Segalovich proposed the name "Yandex" for the search engine, derived from the idea of "Yet Another iNDEX".

== Biography ==
Ilya Segalovich was born in Gorky into a Russian-Jewish family. He graduated from Republican School of Physics and Mathematics in Almaty, Kazakhstan, and then from Moscow Geological Prospecting Institute.

He began his career working on information retrieval technologies in 1990 at Arkadia Company, where he headed their software team. From 1993 to 2000, Ilya Segalovich led the retrieval systems department for CompTek International. He left CompTek to co-found Yandex in 2000. All three of these companies were founded or co-founded by his schoolmate, Arkady Volozh. He had two daughters.

Segalovich was a co-founder and supporter of Maria's Children Art Rehabilitation Center for orphans and children with special needs. He received a degree in geophysics from the S. Ordzhonikidze Russian State Geologic Prospecting University.

On 25 July 2013, Yandex issued a press release stating that Segalovich had died after a long illness. However, the statement was later retracted, with both American and Russian media reporting that he was in a coma with no brain activity. His death was confirmed by Yandex on 28 July 2013. He died of complications from stomach cancer.

== Wealth ==
In 2011, the Russian Forbes ranked Segalovich 159th among the 200 richest Russian businessmen. His wealth was estimated at $US600 million dollars. It later turned out that this estimation was overstated: a report by Yandex's showed that Segalovich owned 2.9% of the company, which equated to $US233 million. During the company's IPO, Segalovich sold part of his stake for $US20.5 million, later explaining it as an investment in charity. Before his death in 2013, Segalovich owned 2.5% of Yandex with a total worth of $US277 million.
