= Yandex Maps =

Russian web mapping service developed by Yandex

Yandex.Maps
- Website type: Web mapping
- Available in: 11 languages
- List of languages Arabic, Armenian, Azerbaijani, English, Kazakh, Russian, Serbian (Latin script), Spanish, Turkish, Ukrainian, Uzbek
- Owner: Yandex
- Creator: Yandex
- Website: yandex.com/maps/
- Commercial: Yes
- Registration: Optional, included with a Yandex account
- Launched: 27 August 2004; 22 years ago
- Current status: Active, developing
- Written in: C++ (back-end), JavaScript, XML, Ajax (UI)

Yandex Maps (Russian: Яндекс Карты, romanized: Yandeks Karty) is a Russian web mapping service developed by Yandex. The service provides detailed maps of the whole world, directions and estimated times of arrival for driving, walking, cycling, kick scooter, and public transportation navigation. It includes a search, information about traffic jams, routing and street panoramas. The service was launched in 2004.

Yandex Maps is the most popular cartographic service in Russia. It has about 11.5 million users in Russia per month, and over 20 million worldwide.

== Features ==
The service initially had maps only of Russia and Ukraine, but now includes world maps. Detailed maps were initially provided for Moscow, Saint Petersburg and Kyiv. Originally, the program could not be used to search for addresses but only establishments.

Maps are available in four versions: maps, satellite images, satellite images with captions, and legend (hybrid).

Users can measure distance and get directions by dragging between spots on a map. The search is available by both geographical objects (addresses, streets, cities, regions and countries) and by organizations. The illumination of the district, city or region is available after searching the organization on the site.

Yandex Maps has a mobile application for iOS, Android and Windows phones.

=== Street view ===
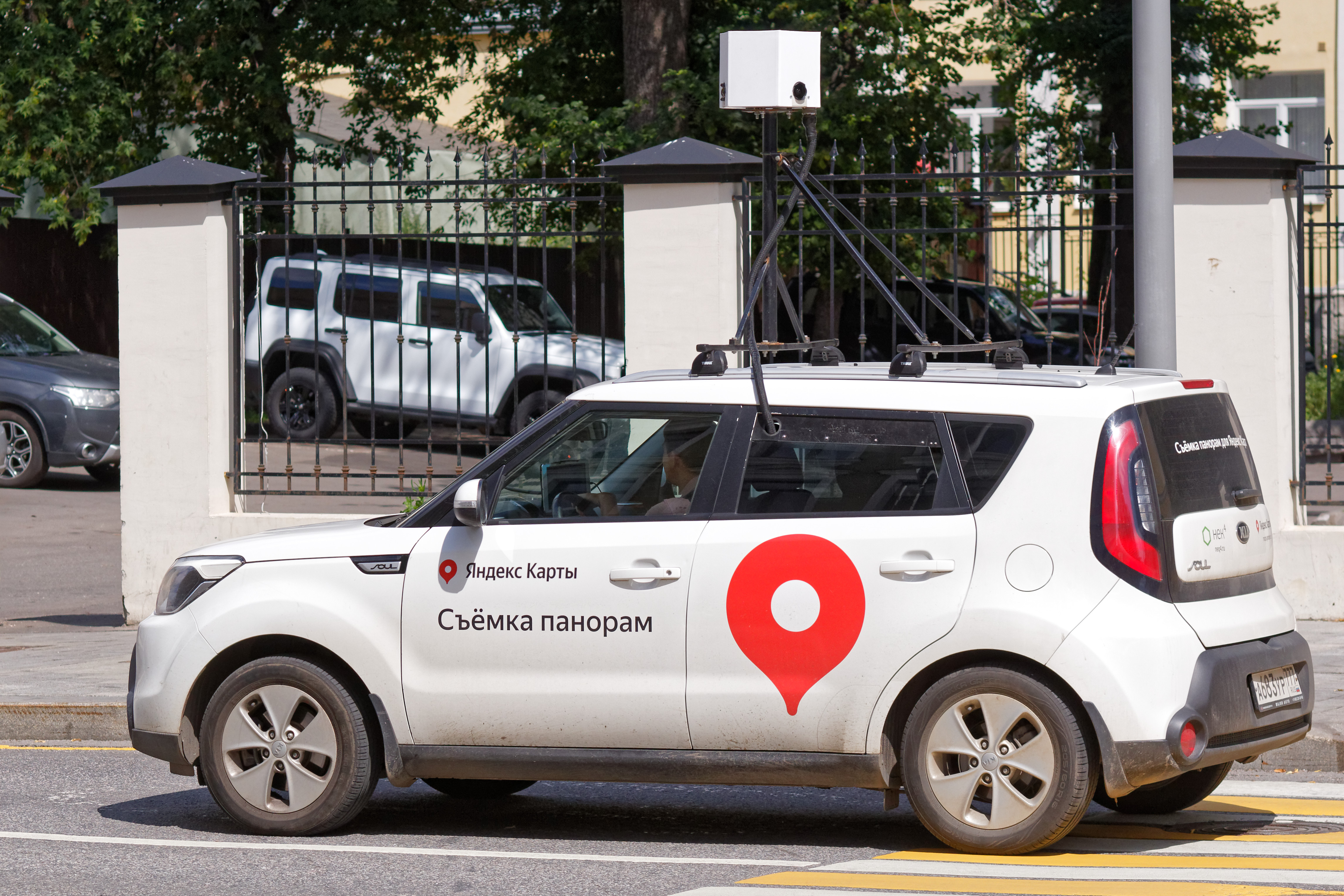
Car shooting panoramas for Yandex Maps

On Yandex Maps, it is possible to view street panoramas. There are street views even of Pripyat and Chernobyl. In 2016, a "street view" of Everest was photographed.

=== Map editor ===
Users can make new data on the map with the help of the Yandex Map editor. In geographies where it is hard to find providers of good map data, user contributions could be used to increase map quality. Any registered Yandex user can edit the map through a simple web editor pending edit moderation.

In the editor, there are five special modes for drawing objects:

- Scaling and rotation - to rotate objects around their axis and reduce / increase the size.
- Angle alignment - makes it easy to draw objects with most corners straight.
- Rounding corners - simplifies the drawing of roads and rivers, rounding their corners.
- Adhesion - the boundaries of the contours of objects of the same category are joined in one line.
- Cutting - helps draw buildings with adjacent borders, as well as high-rise buildings

The editing interface also allows for additional data to be added to certain categories of objects, such as the height of buildings, the direction of traffic at the roads, hours of operation, phone numbers, etc.

== Yandex Traffic ==
Yandex Traffic is a feature on Yandex Maps that displays traffic conditions in real time on major roads and highways. It can be viewed at the Yandex Maps website, or via the app.

Yandex Traffic works by analyzing the GPS-determined locations transmitted to Yandex by a large number of mobile phone users. By calculating the speed of users along a length of road, Yandex is able to generate a live traffic map. It processes the incoming raw data about mobile phone device locations, and then excludes anomalies such as a postal vehicle that makes frequent stops. When a threshold of users in a particular area is noted, the overlay along roads and highways on the map changes color.

== Criticism ==
- The satellite mode of Yandex Maps is not as detailed as Google Maps.
- It has detailed maps only of Russia, Belarus, Ukraine, Turkey, Kazakhstan and Serbia.
- Street view is available only for cities of Russia, Ukraine, Belarus, Kazakhstan, Armenia, Turkey, Serbia, Uzbekistan, Moldova, Kyrgyzstan, Nepal, Azerbaijan and Georgia.

== See also ==
- Comparison of satellite navigation software
- Comparison of web map services
- OpenStreetMap
- Here Map Creator
- Wikimapia
