= Yandex Market =

Russian e-commerce platform

- Company type: Marketplace
- Industry: E-commerce, technology, retail
- Headquarters: Moscow, Russia
- Parent: Yandex
- Website: market.yandex.ru

Yandex Market (Russian: Яндекс Маркет, romanized: Yandeks Market; stylised as Yandex.Market) is a Russian free online service for the selection of goods and shopping. The service was launched on November 30, 2000, by Yandex. Since 2016, it is a separate company.

The service has a daily audience of over 4 million users and monthly audience of 20 million.

== History ==
On November 30, 2000, Yandex.Market was launched entitled "Yandex.Tovary" (literally "Yandex.Products") by employees of Yandex Dmitriy Zavalishin, Evgeniya Zavalishina and Ilya Polozhintsev. Therefore, a month prior, Yandex launched an online consulting service Yandex.Guru that helped the user to choose a product using leading questions. Yandex.Tovary, Yandex.Guru and online service Podberi.ru where all combined into Yandex.Market in 2002.

In June 2013, Yandex.Market opened a website section with the list of recommended online shops. The shop can get a "recommended" status after the conclusion of the contract with Yandex.Market. In 2015 Yandex.Market launched delivery service Yandex.Delivery (Russian: Яндекс.Доставка).

In 2016, Yandex.Market has become a separate company.

In 2018, Yandex.Market and Sberbank launched a joint online marketplace named «Beru». it was closed and included into Yandex.Market in 2020.

== Service work ==
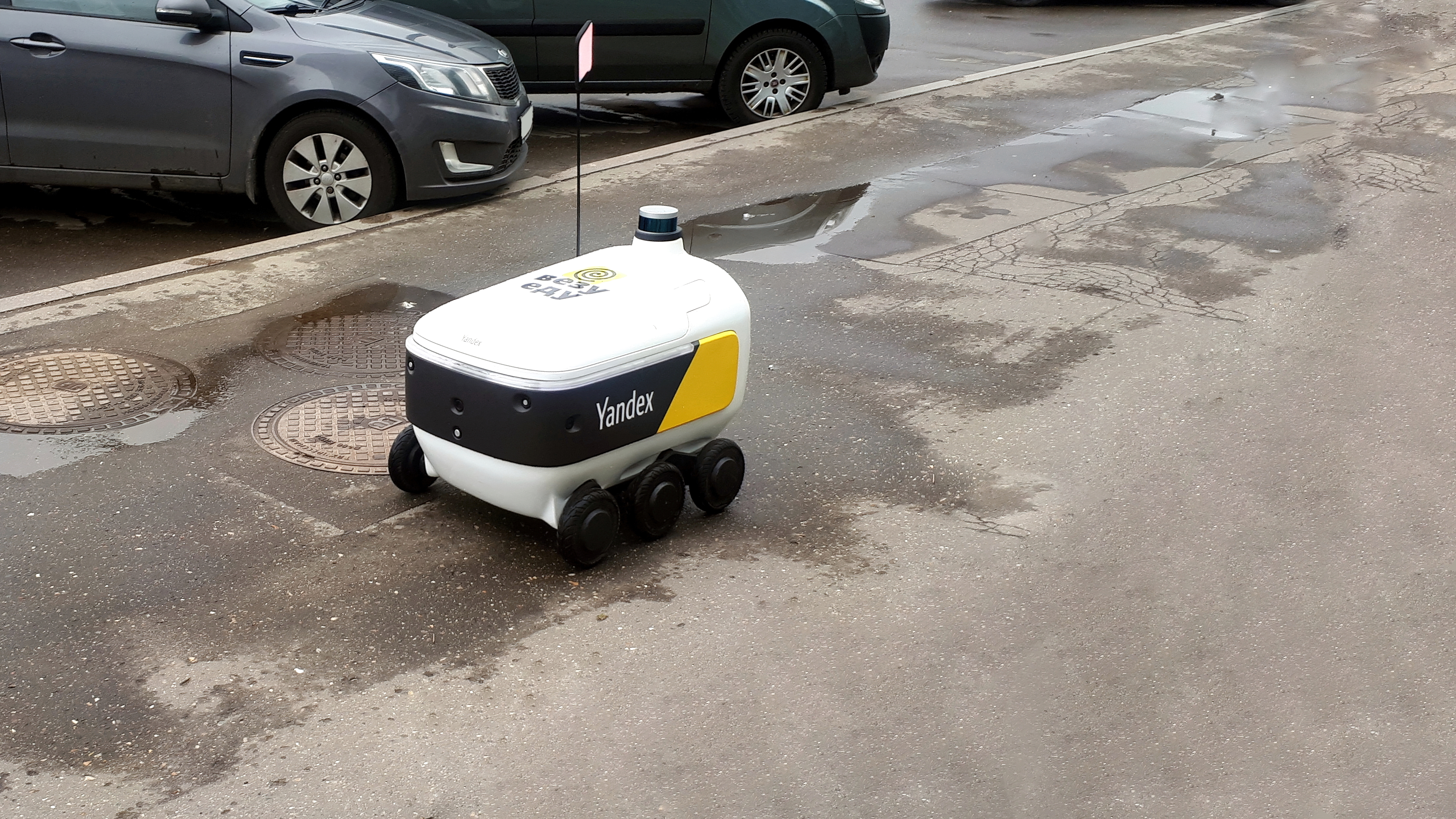
Delivery robot during the first race in a real setting (January 2021).

The general director of Yandex.Market is Daniil Shuleyko. Head office of the company is located in Lotte Plaza business center on the New Arbat Avenue in Moscow.

Users of service can search products by their parameters, view a products specifications, comparison of models and prices, product reviews and overviews, rating of shops, and buy this products.

In February 2020, Yandex launched Yandex.Market Analytics: an online platform with information about electronic equipment market in Russia. This service displays combined data on sales volumes and buyers characteristics (age, gender, geolocation, etc.).
