= Akaba =

Akaba as the name of places or people occurs in various (etymologically unconnected) languages and cultures. It may refer to:

- Akaba (surname)
- Akaba of Dahomey, an 18th-century king of the African kingdom of Dahomey in present-day Benin
- Akaba, Togo, small town in the country of Togo
- Akaba, Uganda, small town in the Nebbi District of Northern Uganda
- Akaba, an alternate spelling for Aqaba, Jordan
- Akaba (meteorite), a meteorite which fell in 1949 near Ma'an, Jordan
- Akaba (band), a Swedish band of former members Pineforest Crunch and Reminder

== See also ==
- Al Aqabah (disambiguation), for several places in the Levant
