= Faille d'Aledjo =

Road cut and landmark in northern Togo

Coordinates: 9.274841°N 1.221427°E

The Aledjo Fault in 2007

The Aledjo Fault (Faille d'Aledjo) is a geographical landmark and road cut in Assoli Prefecture, in the Kara Region of northern Togo. It lies about 36 kilometres (22 mi) north of Sokodé and has long served as a historic passage between the southern and northern parts of the country. The site is known for its dramatic cutting through the Togo Mountains, made to carry National Route 1.

== Geography and location ==
The Aledjo Fault lies in the Togo Mountains, the southern extension of the Atakora Mountains. It sits at an average elevation of about 650 metres (2,130 ft), near the village of Aledjo Kadara, not to be confused with the town of Alédjo in Benin. The site is about 378 kilometres (235 mi) north of Lomé and marks the transition between the Centrale Region and the Kara Region.

== History ==
The first works on the passage date back to the German colonial period in the early 20th century, to ease trade between the south and north of the territory. The present cutting through the mountain was made in the 1950s. It opened a major road corridor linking Lomé to Cinkassé on the border with Burkina Faso. For several decades, the Aledjo Fault was a strategic route for freight and heavy goods vehicles heading to the countries of the Sahel.

== Road infrastructure ==
The road through the cutting follows the old alignment of National Route 1. Because of the gradient, the narrow passage and technical constraints, this section was long considered difficult, especially for heavy vehicles. In the 2010s, a more modern bypass was built to improve safety and traffic flow between Sokodé and Kara. Since the bypass opened, trucks have been banned from the cutting, which is now used mainly by light vehicles.

== Issues and controversies ==
The construction and rehabilitation of the bypass drew criticism in the Togolese press over delays, premature deterioration of the road and suspected poor workmanship. Several temporary closures of the bypass forced traffic back onto the old road through the cutting. These problems fuelled public debate about the management of major road projects in Togo.

== Tourism and heritage ==
Today the Aledjo Fault is regarded as a tourist attraction and scenic landscape. It offers views over the surrounding terrain and passes through several traditional villages. It is often cited as one of the landmarks of northern Togo and draws visitors interested in geography, the history of infrastructure and hiking. The site is also considered a geosite of scientific and heritage value.
