= Railway stations in Togo =

Railway stations in Togo include:

== Maps ==

- UNHCR Map - includes yet to be built railways
- UN Map GH - covers 95% of Togo
- UNHCR Map of Benin - covers 95& of Togo
- UNECA Map

== Towns served by rail ==
All lines 1,000 mm (3 ft 3 3/8 in) gauge. Overview

=== Existing ===
Although the following destinations are listed as 'existing', none of them has been served by trains for many years.

- (Togo) Lomé - port, junction and national capital
- (Togo) Atakpamé - N
- (Togo) Notsé - N
- (Togo) Tsévié - N
- (Togo) Ana - N
- (Togo) Akaba - N
- (Togo) Blitta - N - terminus
- (Togo) Cinkassé - proposed extension in 2018 to Dry Port
- Does not quite reach 1435mm gauge Sahel Railway in Burkina Faso

- Sotouboua - N - extended terminus

- (Togo) Lomé - port, junction and national capital
- (Togo) - Junction to Diamond Cement in Aflao, Ghana
- (Togo) Kpalimé - W - branch terminus

- (Togo) Lomé - port, junction and national capital
- (Togo) - Junction to Diamond Cement in Aflao, Ghana
- - border between Togo and Ghana
- Aflao - Diamond Cement Ghana Limited factory at Aflao to the Lomé Port completed in March 2014.

- Lomé - port, junction
- Aného - E - branch terminus

=== Proposed ===
- Morita
- Tchanaga

- Tabligbo - clinker - CIMAO cement (2001)

- Benin and Niger * (1,000 mm (3 ft 3 3/8 in) gauge).

=== 2018 ===
Proposals Lomé to Cinkassé.

== Treaty ==
A treaty of the 1960s expected certain railway lines to be closed on completion of road improvements.

== See also ==
- Transport in Togo
- Rail transport in Togo
- (African Union) AfricaRail
- Railway stations in Benin
