= Taraz =

Taraz Тараз
- City
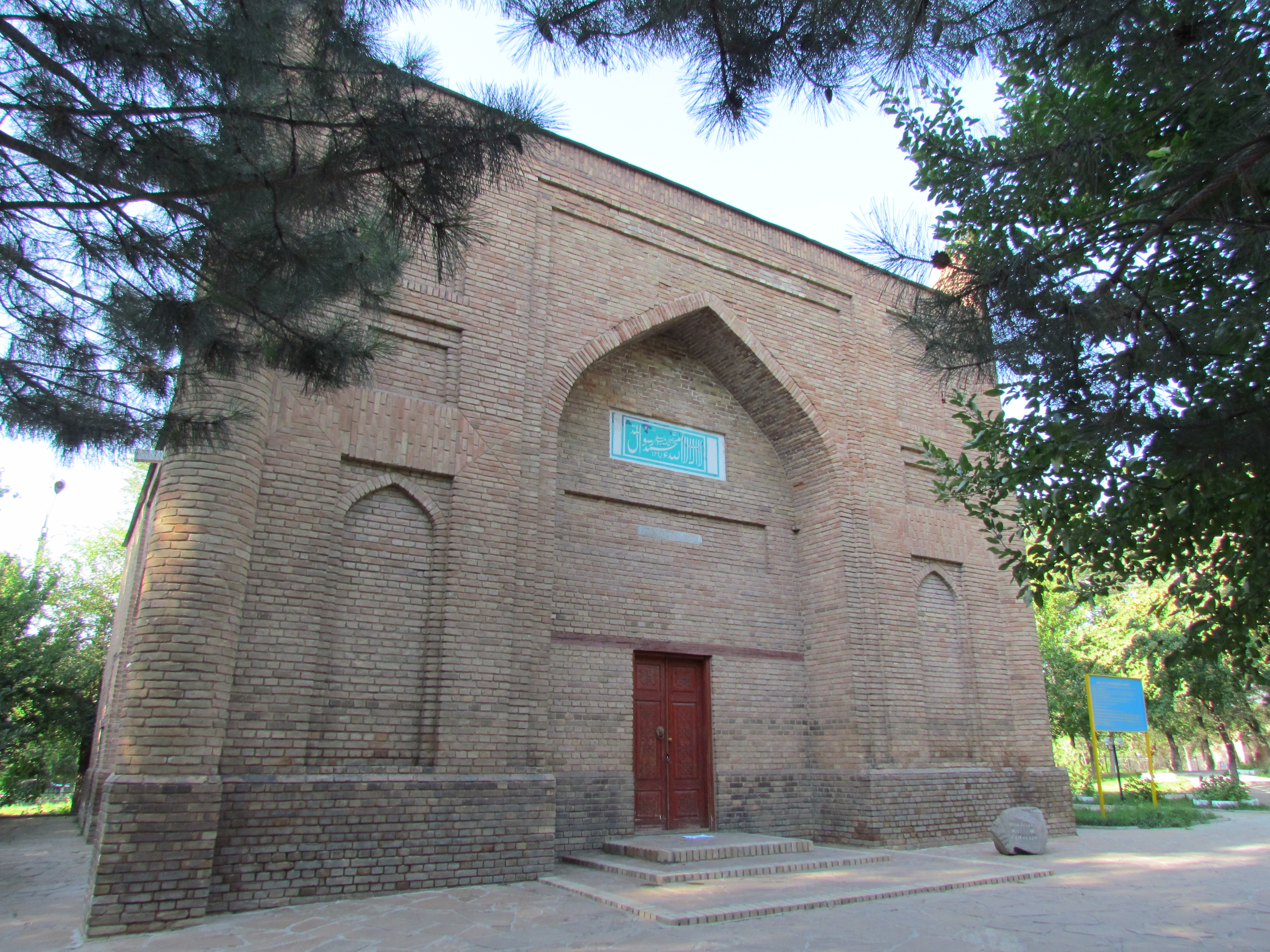
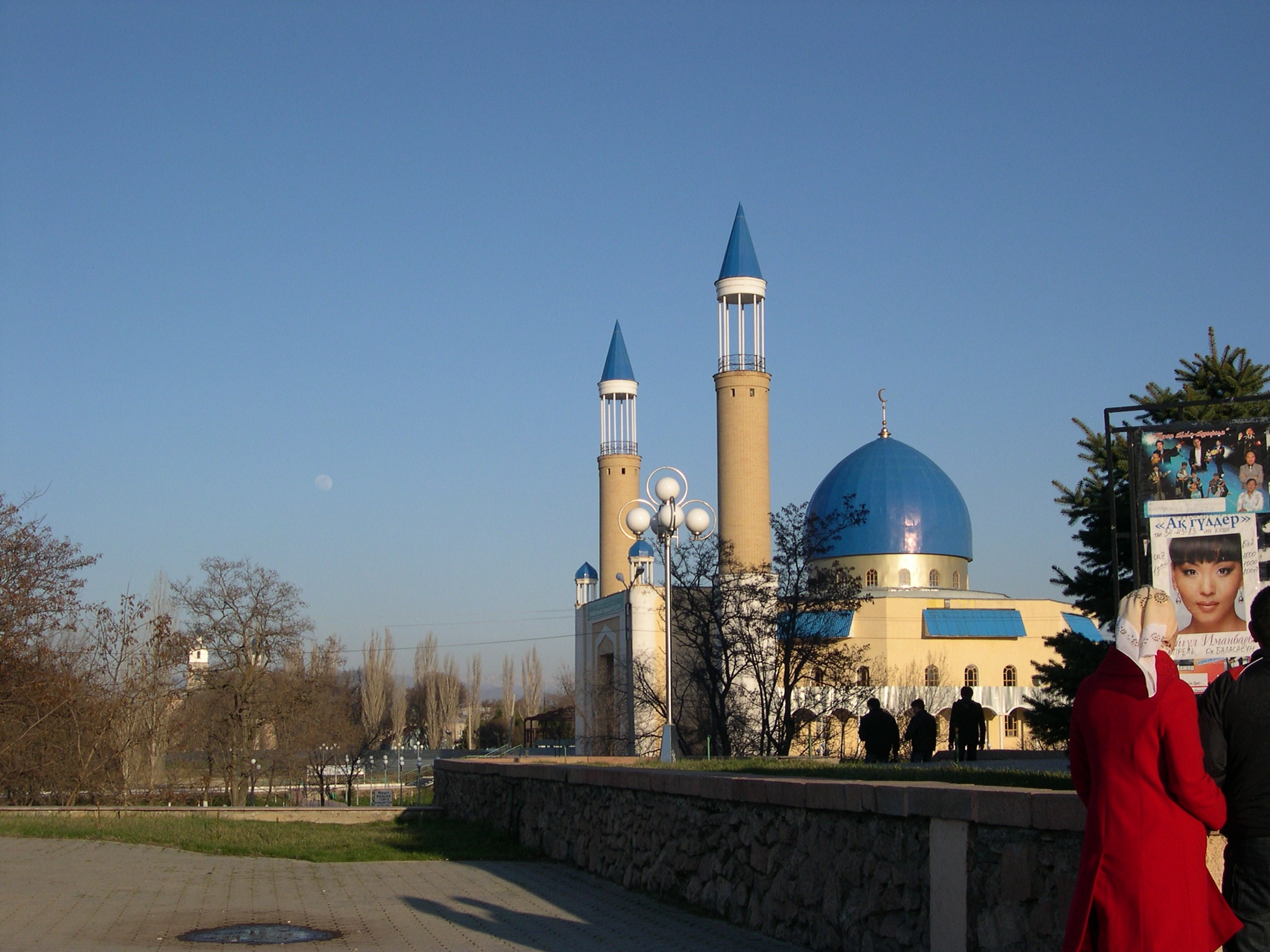
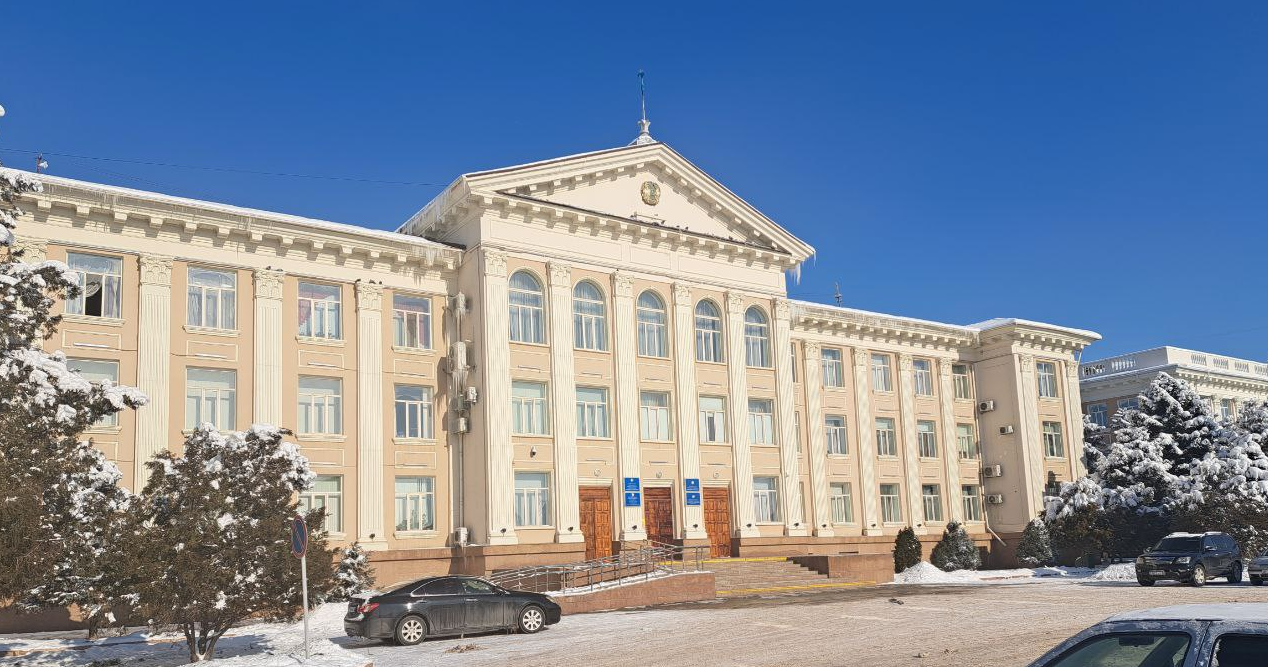
- Karakhan Mausoleum Aulie-Ata Mosque City Hall

- Seal

- Location in Kazakhstan
- Coordinates: 42°54′N 71°22′E
- Country: Kazakhstan
- Region: Jambyl Region
- Founded: 36 BCE

Government
  - Akim (mayor): Orynbekov Bakhytzhan

Area
  - Total: 187.8 km^{2} (72.5 sq mi)
  - Land: 139 km^{2} (54 sq mi)
- Elevation: 610 m (2,000 ft)

Population (2023)
  - Total: 427,256
  - Density: 3,070/km^{2} (7,960/sq mi)
- Time zone: UTC+5
- Postal code: 080001–080019
- Area code: +7 7262
- Vehicle registration: H, 08
- Website: taraz-gov.kz

Taraz (Kazakh: Тараз; also historically known as Talas) is a city and the administrative center of Jambyl Region in Kazakhstan, located on the Talas (Taraz) River in the south of the country near the border with Kyrgyzstan. It had a population of 330,100 as of the 1999 census, up 9% from 1989, making it one of the fastest-growing cities in the country, after Astana and Turkistan. The current population of Taraz is 428,000 (April 2023).

One of the oldest cities in Kazakhstan and in Transoxania, built and populated by the ancient Sogdians, Taraz celebrated its official 2,000th anniversary (recognized by UNESCO) in 2001, dating from a fortress built in the area by a Xiongnu Chanyu named Zhizhi, and was a site of the Battle of Zhizhi in 36 BCE. The city was first recorded under the name "Talas" in 568 CE by Menander Protector. The medieval city of Talas was a major trade center along the Silk Road. It was later described by the Buddhist monk and traveler Xuanzang, who passed Talas in 629 and later wrote: "Traveling westward from the Thousand Springs 140 or 150 li, we come to the city of Daluosi. The city is 8 or 9 li in diameter; and was settled by Hu ("foreign, barbarian, non-Chinese") merchants from various nations. The products and the climate are about the same as Suyab." The Talas alphabet, a variant of the Turkic "runiform" Orkhon script, is named for the town.

Talas secured a place in history by virtue of the Battle of Talas (751 CE), which was fought between forces of the Chinese Tang dynasty and those of the Arab Abbasid Caliphate. The battle took place somewhere along the Talas River in the Talas valley. One of its indirect outcomes was the introduction of paper to the West, via the Arab capture of Chinese papermakers.

== History ==
=== Overview ===
Numerous archaeological finds and monuments in the foothills of Karatau and in Talas-Assin oasis show the antiquity of settlements in the Talas River valley, supporting Taraz's claim to being the most ancient city in Kazakhstan. The history of the city is composed of several historical periods, interrupted by destruction and depopulation. The first reference historically recorded city linked with Taraz and the basis for the claim of 2000-year-old history is the fortress of Zhizhi that briefly existed at the site of modern-day Taraz in the 1st century BCE. A city known as "Taraz" (or "Talas") is then recorded in the 6th century CE (568 CE) and is known to have existed until its decline in the 13th century. The third historical period begins with the establishment of a Kokand fortress at the end of the 18th century, which in 1864 was named Auliye-Ata (from the Uzbek words meaning saint and father). In 1936, the city was renamed Mirzoyan (Russian: Мирзоя́н), after Levon Mirzoyan. After Mirzoyan's arrest in 1938, the city was renamed to Dzhambul (Russian: Джамбу́л), after the Kazakh traditional folksinger Zhambyl Zhabayuly (Dzhambul Dzhabayev). In 1993, the spelling of the name of the city was officially changed to Jambyl/Dzhambyl (Kazakh: Жамбыл, Jambyl), and in 1997 the city was renamed Taraz.

The city started to assume its present form when Colonel Chernyev's detachment took over the Aulie Ata fortress and annexed it to the Russian Empire, starting in 1864. Taraz was greatly improved by the Semirechensky railway that passed through the town in 1917.

=== Antiquity ===
The discovery of chest ornaments, bronze statues of kings and remnants of ceramic products in separate parts of the Talas river valley are the evidence of the existence of the life in Taraz region in the bronze epoch. According to the archaeological excavation and available written sources, tribal unions of Saka Scythians had been formed in this territory by the 7th–8th centuries B.C.

Hanshu, 70 from 1st-century, talk about the fortress constructed on Talas River by Zhizhi Chanyu, a prince of Hun (Ch. Xiongnu, Hsiung-nu, etc.). The fortress is believed to have been at the site of modern Taraz.

=== Medieval Taraz ===
==== Early references ====
However, scarcity of information, inaccuracy of descriptions, and weakness of geography made it impossible to know the location until 1936. Professor Wilhelm Barthold's research established that the location of ancient Taraz was under the Green Bazaar. Further research and archaeological excavations, which were made by an expedition of The USSR Academy of Science in 1938 under the supervision of A. Bernshtam and G. Patsevich to the depth 2–6 meters, made it possible to reconstruct the appearance and cultural–economic importance of ancient Taraz. The latest archaeological data have considerably expanded ideas about Taraz.

At that time the Great Silk Road ran across Southern Kazakhstan. It played a major role in trade and cultural exchange between China, India, Byzantium, and Persia. Taraz developed as a fortified tradecraft city on this massive transcontinental artery. Comparatively gentle climate, fertile soil and rich pastures attracted many stock-breeders and farmers. In the 60-s of the 6th century, the territory of the First Turkic Kaganate section included Taraz. The Sogdian merchants, who controlled the Central Asian section of the caravan route, were interested in easier access to Byzantium and initiated trade negotiations first with the Persians, and then with Byzantium. In response, Byzantium sent ambassadors to the Turkic Kaganate, and in the 568 the embassy led by Zemarchus and Maniach to the Muhan Khan arrived in Taraz at the court of Istemi Yabgu. The Persian ambassador also appeared at the court of the Turkic Kagan at the same time, but Istemi Yabgu allied with Byzantium.

Unfortunately, it is not illustrated in the written sources of that time what Taraz looked like but it is said to have been a big city. The Chinese pilgrim Xuanzang, who passed through Taraz in 630 came to the Ta-lo-se and noticed that the perimeter of the wall is 8 to 9 li(according to the Chinese measures one tang li is about 453 meters) in this city alternately. Due to written sources and archaeological investigation, it is known from the 1st BC to 5th AD Kangui (Kanglu) tribes lived in the Talas River Valley. Similarity between the excavated materials of Taraz and the Kurgans of the Gynskyi and Usunskyi-Kanguiskyi tribes show the introduction of Turkic language. Taraz was joined to the Western Turk Khanate. It felt, like other cities of the region, the influence of Sogdian culture.

Written sources of Paleo-Anthropological material collected from Kurgans in Southern Kazakhstan show the existence of close ties between Taraz and the Kypchaks, Qarluq populations of nearby valleys. As a result of an internecine struggle among Turkish tribal leaders at the beginning of the 8th century the Turkish tribe in the Ili River Valley was divided into two branches: Yellow and Black. The black (kara) Turkish owned the Talas River Valley and made Taraz their capital in the middle of the 7th century. In 751 in the Talas River region, upstream from the modern city of Taraz, an army comprising Tang Dynasty troops from China and Kara Turkish mercenaries fought an army from the Abbasid Caliphate. Despite winning the battle, the Caliphate forces withdrew from the region. In 766 the Kara-Turkish tribes were defeated by Qarlugs from the northwest. Later, nearly all the tribes of the former Western Turk Khanate were conquered.

The development of Taraz as a city arose as the result of the development and strengthening of political and economic ties linked to trade along the Silk Road. As a major halt, it flourished amidst a comparatively gentle climate, fertile soil and rich pastures, which attracted many stockbreeders and farmers. The struggle between Persia and Byzantium for control of the route forced both sides to look for allies. Byzantium sent ambassadors to the Western Turk Khanate, and Zemarkha Kililyskyi arrived in Taraz in 568. Simultaneously the Persians sent their ambassador to the Turks, but Istemi Khan was on the side of Byzantium.

==== Islamic and Persian period ====
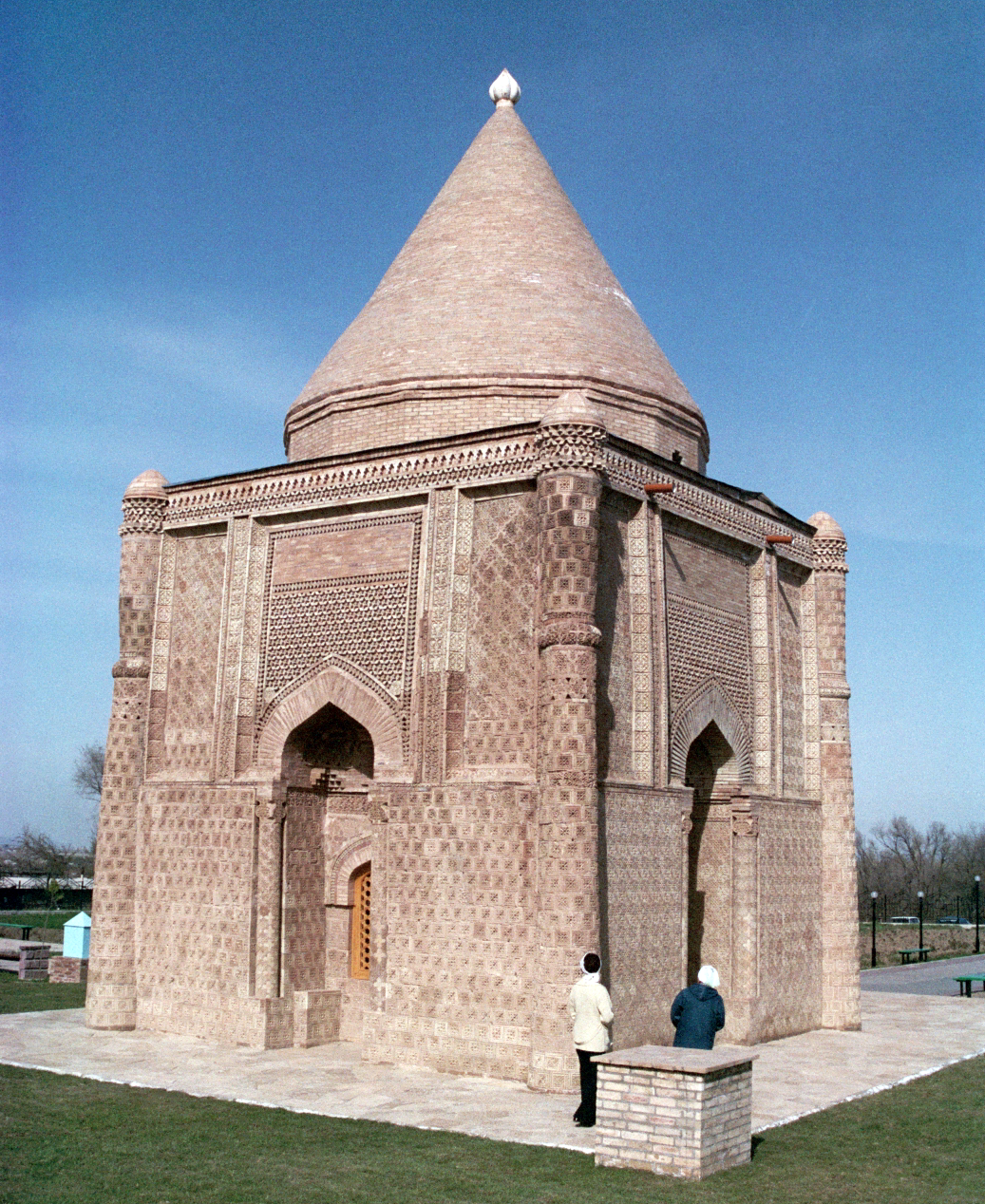
The partially restored mausoleum of Ayshah Bibi near Taraz

This is the site of the "Battle of Talas"—first and the last military face-off between the Muslim Arab forces and the Chinese imperial troops in AD 750–51. After the Arab conquest of Central Asia in the 7th century and 8th century, the Persian Samanids occupied a major part of Central Asia in the 9th century. By this time Taraz, developing little by little had been a rich city-state typical of Central Asia with a large population and vast agricultural zone. In the late 9th century the Samanids extended their rule into the Steppes and captured Taraz (893), then one of the headquarters of the Karluk kaghan. A large church was transformed into a mosque, and according to one source, the "Amir of Taraz" embraced Islam. The Islamization of Central Asia was due in significant part to the activities of the Samanids, and in Taraz, other pre-existing religions such as Mazdaism, Christianity, Buddhism, and Tengrism were gradually replaced.

==== The Karakhanids ====
The Persian Samanids however were defeated by the Turkic Karakhanids who were a confederation of Karluks, Chigils, Yaghmas and other tribes. The Karakhanids were the first Turkic groups to have converted to Islam en masse, and from the 10th to 12th century Taraz was ruled by the Kara-Khanid Khanate as a Muslim state. Ancient Taraz reached the climax of its development in 11th–12th century under the Karakhanids. Instead of more or less centralized state like the Samanids, Karakhanid Central Asia was divided into many small fiefdoms or appanages. Taraz became an important centre. The political independence of Taraz and autonomy of the circle promoted their development. The power of the city under one of the rulers, Tugan-Khan, was so great that he independently waged a military campaign against Samarkand and temporarily captured it. Kashgar was invaded and it was under the Taraz's power during 15 months. Certainly, this political power was the result of the economic importance of the city. In the Karakhanid Era the main part of Taraz, the Shahristan and Arg, did not grow beyond their sizes in the previous Qarluq-Samanid Era. The Arg lost its main significance in the city's life. The Shahristan became the heart of the economic and cultural life of the city. It was there that all the military, administrative, cultural and other establishments that governed life in the medieval feudal city-state took place. At this time in the city and its countryside the mausoleums of Aisha-Bibi and Karakhan were built. Taraz had an underground water system made of terracotta pipes, paved streets, and sewage collection. Of great interest is the Taraz Banya, which was multiple-domed building built from fired brick. In due course, under the influence of internecine wars, the Karakhanids lost their power. The ruler of Karakhanids could not deal with his army of Karluks and Qangli tribesman and so he invited Yelü Dashi, the ruler of Kara Khitans, to his capital of Balasagun to set up base and take control of the empire.

==== Kara Khitai ====
Yelü Dashi from his new capital sent governors to various regions of the empire including Taraz, after which the city was fully under the control of Kara Khitans. In 1181, while Khitan forces were busy fighting the Khwarazmian Empire in Khorasan, Qipchaqs under Qara Ozan Khan attacked and raided the city. In 1204, Khitans sent Tayangu of Taraz with a force of 10,000-40,000 men to help Khwarazmians, who were at war with Ghurids. In 1210 Kara-Khitans were defeated by Khwarazmshah Mohammed.

==== Mongols ====
Karakhanid rule did not last long because in 1220 nearly all Central Asia and the territory of modern Kazakhstan were invaded by Mongols. There were no written documents about Taraz's growth under the Mongols after they razed it to the ground. Remnants of fire found during the excavation show that the city was burnt. Probably the town was renamed as Yany ('New'); while mentioning it, European and Arabic sources write "The city Yany, named Taraz before the conquest." Archaeological finds show that the once-lively city under the Mongolian yoke lost its previous significance and independence. The blooming of settled life in Taraz ended and decline began. Under the Chagatayids (descendants of Chagatai Khan) coins were minted in Taraz until 1334. The Tsareviches, who, as Vasa of 14th century states, "burnt the Golden Horde, destroyed Taraz and other cities, and killed the population. They took everything they could take and burnt the rest. There was a mention of the city again in 1345 in the road guidebook as a city laid on the trade route from Transoxiana to Almalyk." Steady internecine war in Central Asia interfered with the trade with distant countries, and the opening of the sea route from the Western European countries to India stopped the trade on the ancient silk road and led to the decline of the cities on this road.

==== Kazakh rule ====
Taraz is mentioned again in 1513 with the coming of the Kazakh tribes. The once famous medieval city and former capital had become a simple settlement, then it was forgotten, as well as its ancient name. By the 16th century the city's territory had been absorbed into the Kazakh Khanate. The archaeological excavation shows Kazakh nomads were involved in the rebirth of Taraz with cultural links connecting the ancient medieval city with the culture of Kazakh people. The confirmation of it is the names of artificial channels stretched from the city. Under the Kazakh Khans in ancient Taraz there was just a small settlement, the inhabitants of which were engaged in craft, agriculture and cattle breeding. In 1723 the Talas Valley, as well as the major part of southern Kazakhstan were invaded by Dzungars who owned it nearly until 1755.

==== Qing rule ====
After the Dzungars were eliminated by Qing China in 1755, their entire territory, including Talas area, was annexed by the Qing, Qing soldiers patrolled the area once a year. Kazakh people were expelled from the area if they were captured pasturing inside the area.

As a result of the Dzungars' destruction the area became a No man's land, Qing China had to deal with consistent cross-border immigration of Kazakh people. In 1766, the Qianlong Emperor ordered to accommodate Kazakh people in Talas area within the border and settled them properly. The area was promptly populated by Kazakhs. In fact, all of Xinjiang was populated by Kazakhs during the period as the aboriginal western Mongols of Dzungars were eliminated by the Qing in earlier years.

=== From Auliye-Ata to Modern Taraz ===
==== A Kokand fortress ====
In the beginning of the 19th century, the upper part of the Talas River Valley was again invaded by newcomers. This time it was the Qipchaq soldiers of the Khanate of Kokand. They built a few small fortresses for guarding the border and the caravan route mainly on the ancient cities ruins. Due to the comparatively advantageous position of the fortress which was built on the ruins of ancient Taraz a new town began quickly to grow around it. At first, it was named Namangan-i Kochek ("little Namangan"), as the first settlements were from the Persian-populated city Namangan, now in Uzbekistan and uzbekified. In 1856 it was renamed Aulie-Ata, in honor of Karakhan the founder of Karakhanid dynasty. Mullahs, using a legend about the mausoleum of Karakhan in 12th built a new mausoleum with minarets, which had nothing in common with the older one. This new mausoleum preserved the ancient name, "Aulie-Ata" ("holy father"). The town took the same name. By this time the city had become a considerable trade craft center. Annually, a large spring fair was held there. The products of craftsman and agriculture were changed for the things of cattle-breeders. Large consignments of livestock bought at the fair were sent to Tashkent and Fergana through the Karrabul Pass in the Talas-Alatau. The caravan way passed through the city to the north-through Akmolinsk (Astana) and Petropavlovsk (Petropavl), to Omsk.

==== Russian rule ====
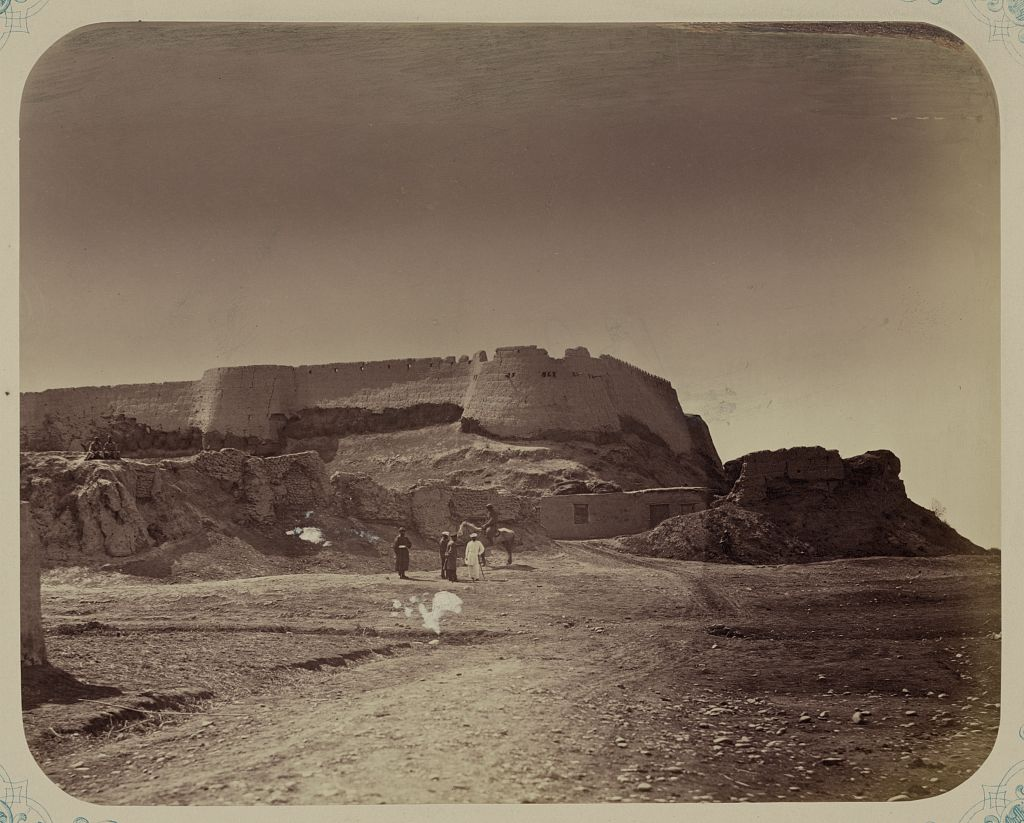
Aulie-Ata in the 1860s

In 1864, Aulie-Ata surrendered after a short siege by Russian forces led by General Mikhail Grigorievich Cherniaev. Soon the line of Russian fortifications across the steppe was connected through Chimkent with the Syr-Darya line. The whole part of this land was included in the Russian state. A new Russian quarter was added to old Aulie-Ata. Its streets were lined with pyramidal poplars, and new houses were built with brick. By that time there were 2,000–3,000 families with houses, shops, mansions, and small adobe houses of the poor. At first, it was ruled by a military administration, later in 1867 it became the center of an Uyezd occupying nearly all of the territory of the modern Jambyl Region of Kazakhstan and Talas Region of Kyrgyzstan. The city continued to play a great role in the livestock trade and in breeding. There appeared some small industrial undertakings, including wine-making. In 1876 the first school of a European type was opened by a Russian priest. At that time there were 11,700 inhabitants in the town – besides Russians and Ukrainians there were a lot of Uzbeks; Kazakhs were nearly absent, as they led a nomadic way of life. A full description of the city at the beginning of the 20th century is given in Russian.

The population consisted of Russians, Uzbeks and Kazakhs.

Ethnic composition of the city according to 1897 census:

- The total – 11,722.
- Uzbeks – 8,460 (72.1%).
- Russians (including Belarusians) – 1,366 (11.6%).
- Kirgiz Kaysak – 589 (5%).
- Sart (Tajik and Uzbek settlers from the Zarafshan oases) – 386 (3.2%).
- Tatars – 266 (2.2%).
- Tajik (Persian speaking merchants from the Fergana oases – 379 (3.2%).

=== Soviet period ===
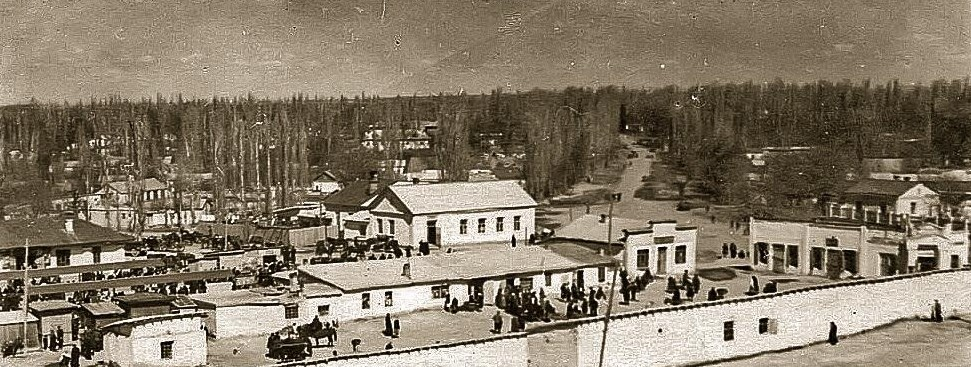
Aulie-Ata in the 1930s

During the first two decades following the Russian Revolution and the Civil War, Aulie-Ata remained a small town. It was renamed Mirzoyan (Russian: "Мирзоян") in 1936, after Levon Mirzoyan (Левон Исаевич Мирзоян), an ethnic Armenian head of the Communists of Kazakhstan. In 1938, after Mirzoyan was executed during Stalin’s Great Purge for opposing the mass deportation of Koreans to northern Kazakhstan from the south, the city was renamed Dzhambul (Russian: "Джамбул", Kazakh: "Жамбыл") after Zhambyl Zhabayev, a Kazakh akyn (folk singer). Starting in the 1930s, Dzhambul, along with other places in Kazakhstan, became the destination for large numbers of the deported peoples who were subject to internal exile. Millions of Volga Germans, Chechens, Ukrainians, Koreans and other ethnic minorities, along with other marginalized subjects (former kulaks, members of the aristocracy, families of convicted "enemies of the people," etc.) were forced to relocate to Kazakhstan, many of whom settled in Dzhambul. Some were evacuated to Kazakhstan, and to Dzhambul, during WWII from the areas that were, or were feared to come, under German occupation. During World War II, in connection with the formation of the Polish Anders' Army, a Polish diplomatic post was established in the city in January 1942, however it was closed in July 1942 when the Soviets arrested three of its staff members (all of whom were released in October 1942).

The city's population continued to grow throughout the 1960s and 1970s in spite of the end of exiles, due to an industrial spurt the city received during that time. As a result, Dzhambul had a highly diverse population composed of multiple ethnic groups, the largest being the Russians, followed by the Kazakhs. Fast-paced industrialization brought many amenities of modern urban living to the city, previously largely unknown, such as typical Soviet apartment blocks as well as condo-style houses, now all supplied with electricity and running water; roads and public transport; several higher education institutions; large public parks, department stores, etc.

Although chemical and construction industries made up the core of the city's economy, Dzhambul continued to function as an unofficial trade post with its proximity to the other Central Asian republics and a relatively mobile population. The city was known in the area for its large bazaars with farmers selling agricultural produce from throughout the region.

=== After independence ===
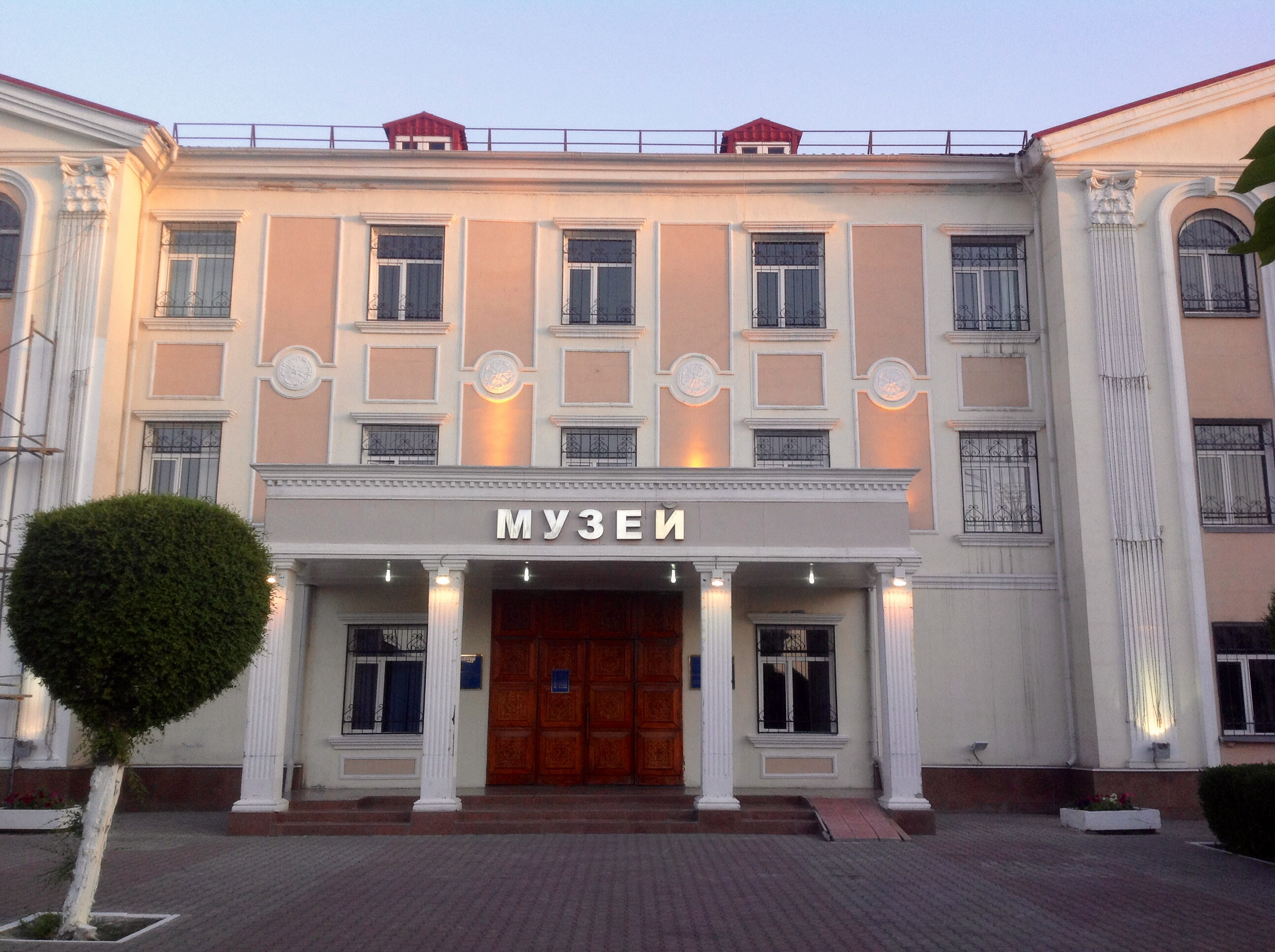
Historical museum

Dzhambul, along with much of Kazakhstan, suffered a severe economic crisis in the early 1990s after the break-up of the Soviet Union, with many industries coming to an almost complete halt. The demographics of the city have changed drastically as well. The city lost a significant portion of its population with the exodus of the various nationalities that once made up its diversity, notably the Volga Germans and the Jews, as well as many Russians and Ukrainians. This trend was partially off-set by the migration of Kazakhs from rural areas into the city. The city's name was changed to its Kazakh spelling (Zhambyl) in early 1992 and to Taraz (Тараз) in 1997. The city's economy has experienced a partial revival in the early 2000s. The city established a sister city relationship with Fresno, California, United States according to Sister Cities International, but this relationship is inactive. In 2001, Taraz also entered into a sister city relationship with Muncie, Indiana.

On 12 November 2011, a gunman "described by officials as a jihadist" killed at least eight people, including five police officers and himself, in Taraz.

The eponymous domestic vodka, Taraz, considered the best in Kazakhstan, is produced in the city.

== Geography ==
=== Climate ===
Taraz has a cold semi-arid climate (Köppen climate classification BSk) with strong continental influences. It has a mean January temperature of −3 °C (27 °F) and a mean July temperature of 25.5 °C (77.9 °F).

Climate data for Taraz (1991–2020, extremes 1870–present)
Month	Jan	Feb	Mar	Apr	May	Jun	Jul	Aug	Sep	Oct	Nov	Dec	Year
Record high °C (°F)	22.1 (71.8)	25.0 (77.0)	31.1 (88.0)	33.6 (92.5)	38.6 (101.5)	42.3 (108.1)	43.7 (110.7)	43.1 (109.6)	40.6 (105.1)	34.6 (94.3)	29.0 (84.2)	22.7 (72.9)	43.7 (110.7)
Mean daily maximum °C (°F)	2.2 (36.0)	4.3 (39.7)	11.3 (52.3)	18.6 (65.5)	24.7 (76.5)	30.6 (87.1)	33.0 (91.4)	31.8 (89.2)	25.8 (78.4)	18.0 (64.4)	9.4 (48.9)	3.8 (38.8)	17.8 (64.0)
Daily mean °C (°F)	−3 (27)	−1.3 (29.7)	5.3 (41.5)	12.2 (54.0)	18.0 (64.4)	23.4 (74.1)	25.5 (77.9)	23.9 (75.0)	17.9 (64.2)	10.9 (51.6)	3.6 (38.5)	−1.6 (29.1)	11.2 (52.3)
Mean daily minimum °C (°F)	−7.4 (18.7)	−5.8 (21.6)	0.1 (32.2)	6.2 (43.2)	10.9 (51.6)	15.6 (60.1)	17.5 (63.5)	15.7 (60.3)	10.3 (50.5)	4.7 (40.5)	−1.2 (29.8)	−5.9 (21.4)	5.1 (41.1)
Record low °C (°F)	−38.9 (−38.0)	−40 (−40)	−25 (−13)	−12.2 (10.0)	−5.2 (22.6)	3.0 (37.4)	7.2 (45.0)	3.0 (37.4)	−5 (23)	−14.3 (6.3)	−37.2 (−35.0)	−35 (−31)	−40.0 (−40.0)
Average precipitation mm (inches)	29.7 (1.17)	36.5 (1.44)	38.3 (1.51)	49.2 (1.94)	40.4 (1.59)	28.3 (1.11)	18.2 (0.72)	8.6 (0.34)	9.9 (0.39)	30.1 (1.19)	35.6 (1.40)	32.1 (1.26)	356.9 (14.06)
Average precipitation days (≥ 1.0 mm)	6.4	6.5	7.0	7.2	6.2	4.6	3.1	1.6	1.6	4.0	5.6	6.3	60.1
Average relative humidity (%)	79	80	76	67	58	51	46	46	50	62	75	80	64
Source 1: Pogoda.ru.net
Source 2: NOAA, Deutscher Wetterdienst (humidity)

== Sports ==
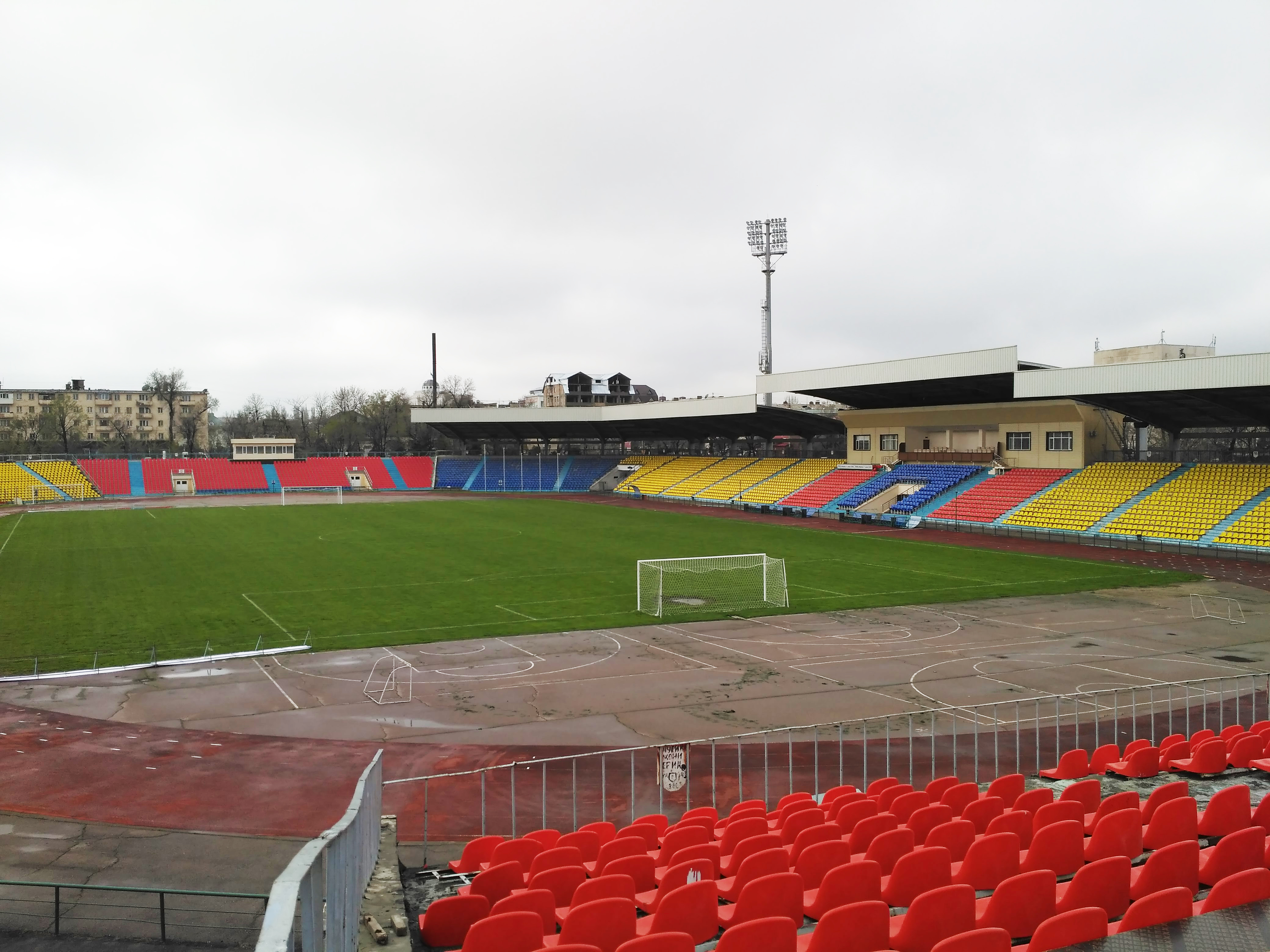
Taraz Central Stadium, home venue of FC Taraz

Taraz is hosting the football team FC Taraz that used to play in the Kazakhstan Premier League. Woman Grand Master in chess Bibisara Assaubayeva, the 2021 World Champion in Women's Blitz Chess, is a native of Taraz.

The city is home to the football club "Taraz" (in addition to which there were previously two more clubs, "Lokomotiv" and "Dynamo"). Its home stadium is the "Central" stadium with a capacity of over 12,500 spectators.

Known graduates of sports schools of the Olympic reserve, boxing, and wrestling include Serik Konakbaev, Zhaksylyk Ushkempirov, Bolat Jumadilov, Bakhtiyar Artayev, Ermakhan Ibraimov, Akzhurek Tanatarov, Sagov Ismail, Eldos Smetov, Junusaliyev Bigazy, and many others. The city has several swimming pools, including the Soviet-era "Delfin" pool.

In the "Bayterek" microdistrict, there is the sports complex "Taraz-Arena."

The city has three stadiums: "Central," "Dynamo," and "Lokomotiv."

Eldos Smetov became the first Kazakh world junior champion and was born in Taraz. He is also the 2024 Olympic champion, silver medalist at the 2016 Rio de Janeiro Olympics, bronze medalist at the 2020 Tokyo Olympics [ 1 ], 2015 World Champion, bronze medalist at the 2022 World Championships, 2010 World Youth Champion, 2016 Asian Champion, and winner of the 2014 Asian Games.

Since 2018, the Zhambyl Marathon has been held.

== Heads of the City ==
=== First Secretaries of the City Committee ===
- Aleksei Pavlovich Fedotov – January 1939 – May 1940
- Abdildin A. – April 1940 – May 1941
- A. A. Tsarev – April 1941 – May 1943
- A. M. Sannikov – April 1943 – June 1946
- Aleksei Pavlovich Fedotov – January 1947 – May 1951
- N. I. Prokhorov – June 1951 – May 1955
- Sergei Ivanovich Kondratiev – September 1955 – April 1963
- N. M. Bobir – May 1963 – May 1972
- Vladimir Grigorievich Korotkov – June 1972 – April 1975
- Vasilii Grigoryevich Bannikov – April 1975 – October 1983
- Yuri Efimovich Dodonov – October 1983 – February 1987
- Stanislav Nikolaevich Makarov – May 1987 – May 1990
- Lidiya Abylgazievna Akhmetova – April 1991 – August 1991

=== Chairmen of the City Executive Committee ===
- Pyotr Vasilyevich Buchenko – August 1939 – January 1940
- V. F. Glukhov – January 1940 – September 1940
- V. V. Sinitsin – September 1940 – September 1941
- Pyotr Vasilyevich Buchenko – May 1942 – May 1943
- K. A. Barmashev – May 1943 – August 1946
- Fyodor Artemyevich Babintsev – August 1946 – May 1950
- A. I. Galyamin – May 1950 – January 1952
- S. Eskeldiev – April 1952 – October 1952
- T. Kusainov – October 1952 – May 1957
- Alimhan Komratov – May 1957 – January 1965
- Azhibay Absemotov – January 1965 – December 1969
- Tleugabyl Torebekov – May 1970 – June 1983
- Shors Kubataevich Sharafutdinov – June 1983 – May 1987
- Kazbek Suleymenov – May 1987 – October 1990
- Tuygynbek Temirbekov – October 1990 – February 1992

=== Akims (Mayors) ===
- Aldiyar Ali-Askarovich Tussupov – February 1992 – October 1995
- Bolat Abzhaparuly Zhilkyshev – October 1995 – January 1998
- Seit Khayrullayevich Sartbaev – January 1998 – February 1999
- Bolat Ospanovich Sauranbayev – February 1999 – April 2005
- Ilyas Alimovich Tortayev – 2005 – 2009
- Ertargyn Kakimbekovich Astayev – 8 December 2009 – October 2010
- Bekbolat Serikbekovich Orunbekov – October 2010 – 31 December 2013
- Nurjan Sabitovich Kalenderov – 31 December 2013 – 2 March 2017
- Rustem Rysbaevich Daulat – 2 March 2017 – 23 April 2018
- Galymzhan Rayilovich Abdraymov – 23 April 2018 – 12 April 2019
- Kairat Askerbekuly Dosaev – 24 April 2019 – 22 November 2019
- Aytkazy Dauletkulovich Karabalaev – 3 December 2019 – 19 March 2021
- Erzhan Zhilkibaev – 19 March 2021 - 5 August 2022

== Transport and Communications ==
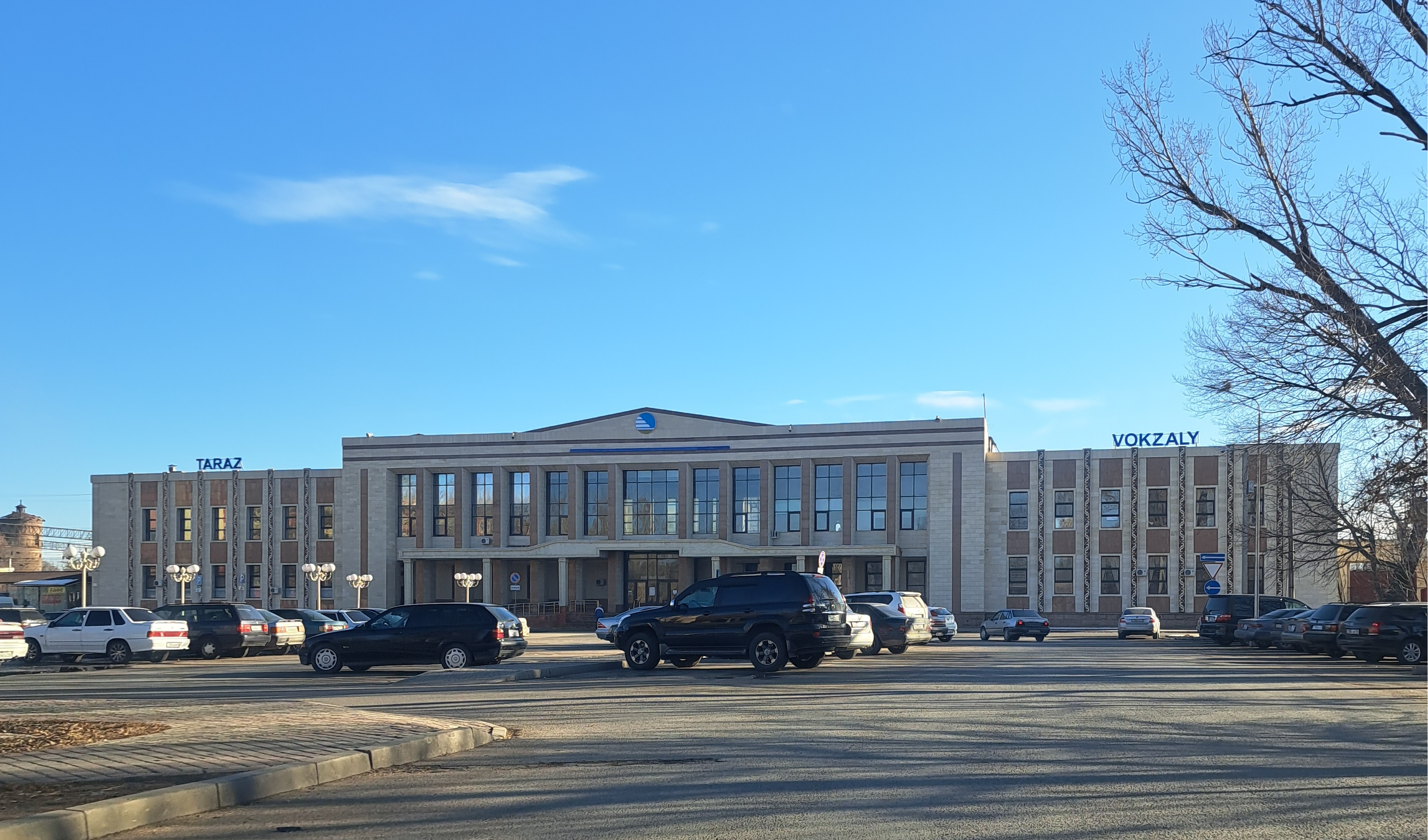
Taraz railway station

Zhambyl regional telecommunications department of JSC "Kazakhtelecom" provides local, long-distance, and international telephone services, mobile radiotelephone communications, as well as services for broadcasting television and radio programs.

In telecommunications, work continues on the planned replacement of outdated telephone exchanges with more advanced digital stations and the transition from copper cable networks to fiber-optic networks. The national satellite communication system DAMA operates with 10 systems.

The total length of roads in the region is 4117 km, including 847 km of republican roads. The city is bypassed by the republican highway A-2 Almaty – Tashkent – Termez, connecting the republics of Kazakhstan, Kyrgyzstan, and Uzbekistan.

In 2009, the construction of the Western Europe – Western China highway began in the country, including in the Zhambyl region, and was completed in 2013. The maximum speed limit will be 120 km/h. The project includes road bridges over several rivers, road operation complexes, stopping areas, bus pavilions, livestock crossings, and electronic boards. Currently, major repairs are underway on the highway Tараз – Мерке – Татты – Шу – Бурылбайтал – Шыганак, which serves the transportation flow to the cities of Astana and Karaganda.

Passenger transport within the city is provided by 10 private transportation organizations operating 575 buses on 53 routes. In 2018, transport companies purchased 60 new buses, and in 2019, another 75 new buses were acquired.

In accordance with the decree of the city akimat of Taraz No. 1547 from 20 April 2021, starting from 4 May 2021, the fare for city public transport increased from 65 to 85 tenge for adults and from 30 tenge to 40 tenge for schoolchildren with a TULPARCARD or corresponding mobile application. The fare for cash payments remained unchanged: 130 tenge for all passengers and 65 tenge for schoolchildren. The cost of an empty TULPARCARD is 500 tenge. Two types of cards are issued: Unified – for all categories of citizens and School – with a 50% discount on the full fare. The cost of a one-time trip is included in the card purchase: for the Unified card – 85 tenge, for the School card – 40 tenge. Transport cards can be purchased at TULPARCARD cash desks and other sales points.

As of July 2024, the fare for public transport is 85 tenge.

The city has several bus stations from which intercity buses depart to other cities of Kazakhstan and the region.

There are several taxi fleets and a branch of "Yandex.Taxi", as well as car rental services, bicycle rentals, and increasingly popular electric scooters.

The Taraz railway station (Zhambyl railway station) and the Shaiykoryk, Choldala, Kumshagal, and Buryl stations are operational.

The international airport "Aulie-Ata" also serves the region.

== Notable people ==
- Goga Ashkenazi, Kazakh businesswoman and socialite
- Eljan Birtanov, politician.
- Nurtas Adambay, film director, writer and actor.
- Dmitriy Vaisbekker-Ivanov, writer
- Bibisara Assaubayeva, Grandmaster, Three-time Women's World Blitz Chess Champion
