= Sotouboua Prefecture =

Prefecture of Togo

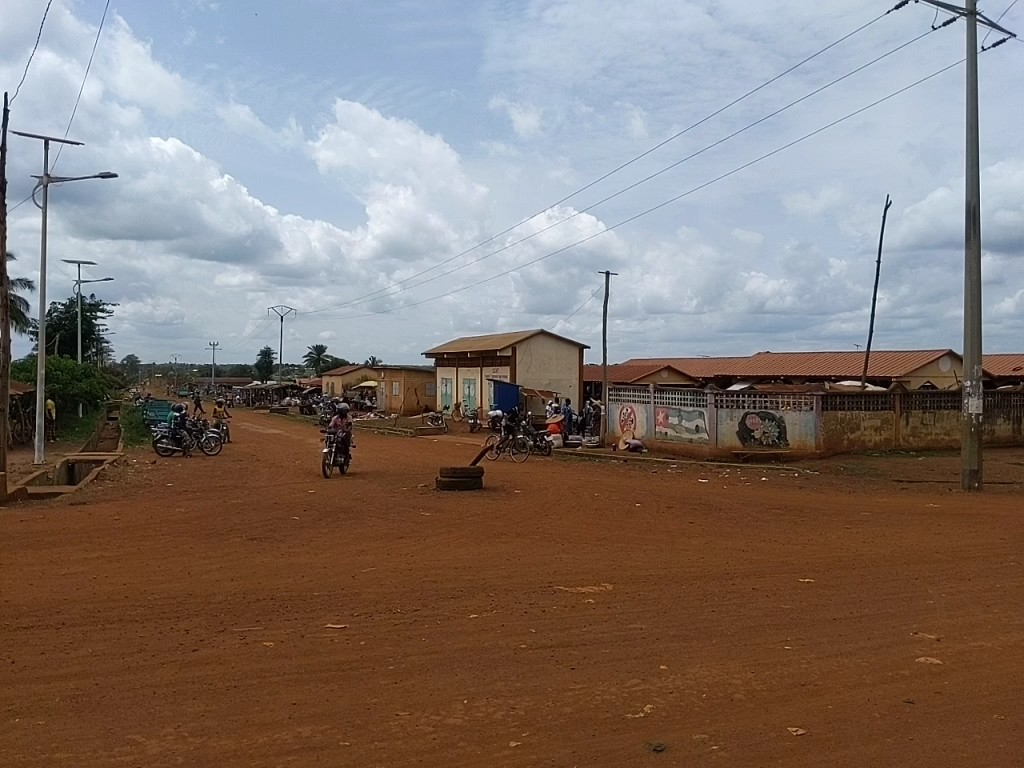
Sotouboua's main market

Sotouboua Prefecture is a prefecture of the Centrale Region of Togo. Its principal town is Sotouboua. At the time of the 2022 census it had a population of 138,864 people. Covering an area of 4,487 square kilometres (1,732 sq mi), it is divided administratively into 11 cantons including Sotouboua, Adjengré, Tchébébé, Aouda, Fazao, Titigbé, Kaniamboua, Bodjondé, Sassaro, Kazaboua, Tabindè.

== Populated places ==
- Ayengre
- Mpoti
- Sotouboua
