= Tchanaga =

Town in Togo

Coordinates: 10°30′15″N 00°29′29″E

Tchanaga is a canton in Oti prefecture, Togo.

== Transport ==
It is proposed to be served by a railway station on the Togo Railways network.

== Geography ==
Tchanaga is a canton in Oti Prefecture, Savanes Region, northern Togo. It lies near the border with Benin.

== Administration ==
The canton forms part of the administrative subdivisions of Oti Prefecture.

== Demographics ==
Population data for the canton are reported by the national census.

== See also ==
- Railway stations in Togo
- Transport in Togo
