= Dmitriy Vaisbekker-Ivanov =

Vaisbekker-Ivanov, Dmitriy
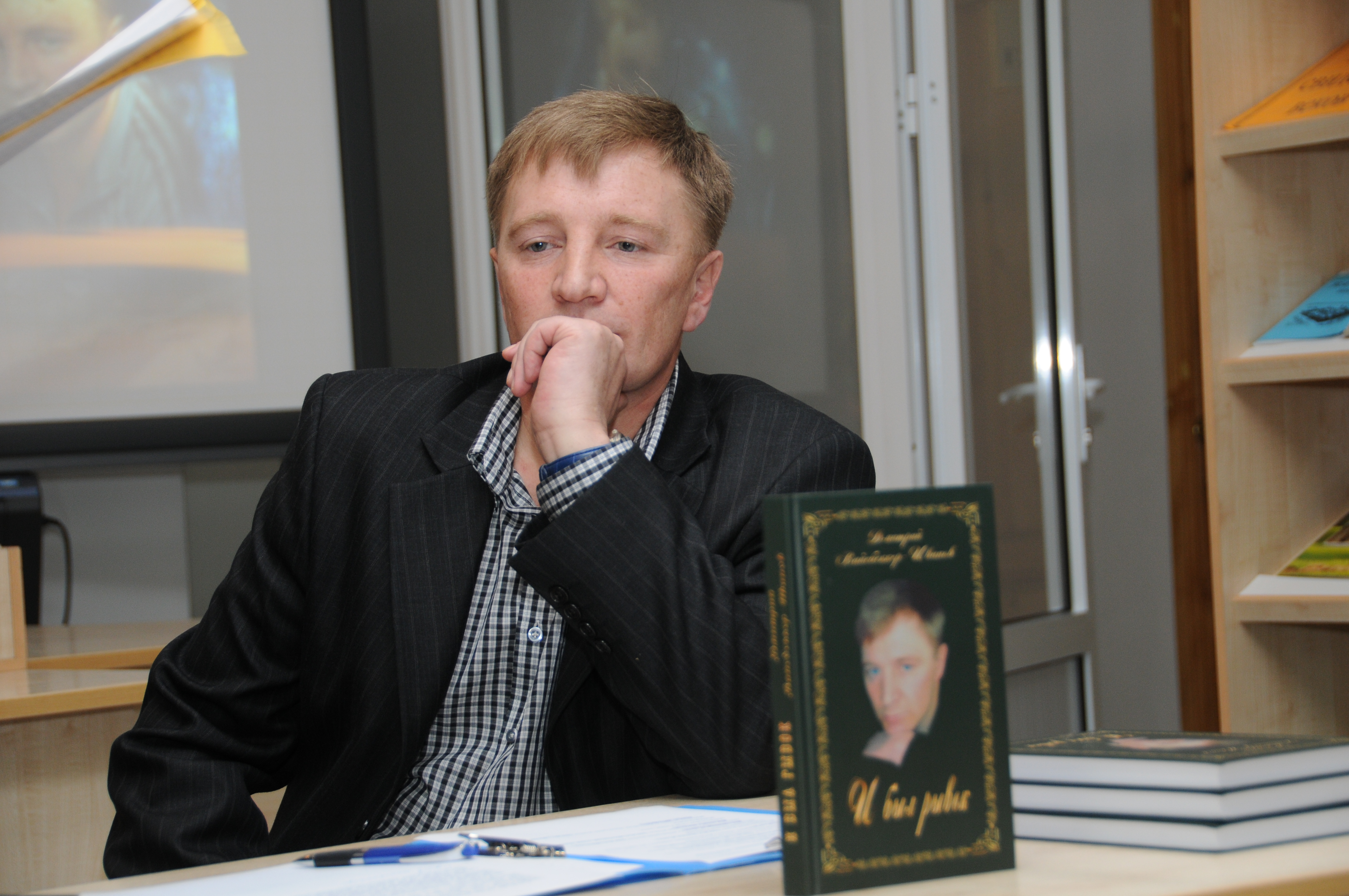
- Born: 1 December 1970 (age 55); Dzhambul, Kazakh SSR, Soviet Union
- Occupations: Poet, novelist, essayist
- Writing career
- Language: Russian
- Years active: 2001—now
- Genres: Poem, story, essay, fable, rubai
- Notable awards: International premium "Philanthropist"
- Literary movement: Realism, lyrics, imagism, symbolism, fantasy

Dmitriy Alexandrovich Vaisbekker-Ivanov(ger. Weißbäcker-Ivanov) (born 1 December 1970) is a Soviet and Kazakh poet. He is a citizen of the Republic of Kazakhstan. Dmitriy is the First award winner of the International award "Philanthropist" in the category "Literary work", subcategory "Small prose" for outstanding achievements in culture and art, Moscow, 2014. He is the First award winner of the republican competition "Different but equal" in the category "The Gold Feather", Taraz, 2014.

== Biography ==
Vaisbekker-Ivanov was born in 1970 in Dzhambul (now Taraz). After school and service in the Soviet Army he was involved in small business. In 1996 illness confined him to bed for 4 years. After two clinical deaths, the writer started his first literary steps in poetry and prose. In 2001 Dmitry overcame his illness and started to work as a non-staff correspondent in the city newspaper Board. He later cooperated with regional Russian-language periodicals in Taraz. In 2003 illness returned and stopped writing for 2 years. He again overcame his illness and resumed work as a journalist for regional political newspaper Southern Express. In a month he was appointed as editor-in-chief. That year he was elected as a member of the executive committee of the journalists Congress of Kazakhstan in Zhambyl region. He worked there till 2009. From 2007 to 2009 he was Editor of political newspaper City 326. Renewed illness forced him to stop journalistic activity and concentrate on literature. He published his works in Prostor magazine, and in The provincial intellectual.

== Family ==
His father was Vaisbekker Alex Floreanovich, born in 1930 in the Majdorf of the Saratov area. Before the Second World War the writer’s grandfather was arrested by the People's Commissariat of Internal Affairs, and his family together with other German families from Volga region were banished to collective farms in the Ubagansk region of Kustanay oblast. Ivanov's father was compelled to change his surname from Vaisbekker to Ivanov. His mother was Ivanov Elena Nikitichna (maiden name Belik-Zadneprovsky). She was born in Irinovka village, Urdzharsky region, Semipalatinsk oblast, in 1941. His first wife was Bikasheva Oksana Valerevna (1972 ). Their son was Paul Dmitrievich (b. 1989 ). With his second wife, Molchunova Oksana Viktorovna (1973) he had daughter Alain Dmitrievna (1995 г.р.) His third wife – Morjanova Natalia Petrovna (Serbian by father’s line from Tsveich family) was born in a Dzhambul (1975). She is a poet, philologist and teacher of Russian literature. Son – Ivanov Evgenie Dmitrievich (2005 г.р.)

== Creation ==
=== Books ===
- And there was a spurt (Almaty, 2014)
- Legend of Taraz (Almaty, 2015)

=== Compilations ===
- Oasis-2002 (Taraz, 2002)
- Smile Pegasus (Taraz, 2004)
- Oasis 2004 (Taraz, 2004)
- Tarazdyn zhas talanttary (Taraz, 2005)

== Social Networks ==
- "Дмитрий Вайсбеккер-Иванов". YouTube.
- Дмитрий Вайсбеккер's channel on YouTube
- Дмитрий Вайсбеккер-Иванов's channel on YouTube
- "OK.RU". OK.RU.
