= Erzhan Zhilkibaev =

Kazakh politician (born 1982)

- Ержан Жуматович Жилкибаев

Äkim of Taraz
- In office 19 March 2021 – 5 August 2022
- President: Kassym-Jomart Tokayev
- Prime Minister: Asqar Mamin; Älihan Smaiylov
- Preceded by: Aytkazy Karabalaev
- Succeeded by: Bakhytzhan Orynbekov

Äkim of the Medeu District of Almaty
- In office 27 May 2016 – 25 March 2019
- President: Kassym-Jomart Tokayev
- Preceded by: Berdibek Saparbayev
- Succeeded by: Daulet Karibek

Deputy Äkim of the Jambyl Region
- In office 17 February 2020 – 16 March 2021
- President: Kassym-Jomart Tokayev
- Preceded by: Sultanbek Makezhanov
- Succeeded by: Sultanbek Makezhanov

Personal details
- Born: December 17, 1982 (age 43) Lenger, Kazakh SSR, Soviet Union
- Party: Amanat

Erzhan Zhilkibaev (Russian: Ержан Жуматович Жилкибаев; born 17 December 1982) is a Kazakh politician of the Amanat party. He has served as Äkim of the city of Taraz, of the Medeu District of Almaty, and as deputy Äkim of the Jambyl Region under President Kassym-Jomart Tokayev's administration.

== Early life ==
Zhilkibaev was born on 17 December 1982 in the city of Lenger, which was then part of the Kazakh SSR in the Soviet Union. During his youth, he graduated with a bachelor's degree in economics and management from the Auezov South Kazakhstan State University in Shymkent in 1999. Later on he went to the higher education institution of the Academy of Public Administration under the President of the Republic of Kazakhstan, where he graduated from in 2006 with a Master's in Local Administration and then in 2011 from the Sarsen Amanzholov East Kazakhstan State University with a degree in jurisprudence.

== Career ==
He began his career in 2003 when he became a chief specialist of the Department of Economy for the then South Kazakhstan Region (now known as the Turkistan Region). Three years later, he moved to the Office of the Prime Minister when he was appointed the chief expert. A year later, he became Head of the Department of Economics and Budget Planning in the Ministry of Economy and Budget Planning. Then, from 2009 to 2011, he was Deputy Chief of Staff of the East Kazakhstan Region, and for a year afterwards was Deputy Äkim of the city of Semey.

In 2012, he was appointed Head of the Office of the Äkim of the East Kazakhstan Region. In a report in 2013, he emphasized the need for accountability and improvement of administrative performance, while criticizing weak executive discipline. He held this position until 2015, when he became State Inspector of the Department of State Control and Organizational-Territorial Works. On 27 May 2016, he was appointed Äkim of the Medeu district of Almaty. He was mainly chosen for his experience in the economy. During his time in office, he pledged to resolve infrastructure problems by allocating 50 million tenge from the city budget. During his tenure, housing modernization programs were developed, with facades and repairs of housing within the city being done. He also briefly served as First Vice Minister of Labor and Social Protection of the Population in 2019.

He was appointed Deputy Äkim of the Jambyl Region on 17 February 2020 after the president dismissed the government officials of the region following the 2020 Dungan–Kazakh ethnic clashes that led to the death of 11 people. His administration mainly focused on the Korday District, due to him calling it a difficult area following the clashes, by implementing social projects, roads, and more infrastructure. A prominent scandal during his time was that the leadership of the Merki District Hospital was dismissed following an official investigation with problems due to the so-called irresponsible approach of the hospital's management.

On 19 March 2021 it was announced that he was appointed Äkim of the city of Taraz. During his tenure, he worked on sports infrastructure and attempted to implement the "listening state" concept that President Tokayev had started, to mixed reception. There was also some civic dissatisfaction over the buses in the city, to which he attempted to direct the carriers to spend more on newer buses, which they replied they had no funding for since banks refused loans. He also aimed to create development for tourism in Taraz by creating Aulie-Ata square. On 5 August 2022, he announced he was leaving the post through a Facebook post.
