= Yandex self-driving car =

Robotaxi project

Yandex Self-Driving Group
- Industry: Automotive industry
- Founded: 2016; 10 years ago
- Headquarters: Moscow, Russia
- Products: Self-driving cars Delivery robots
- Parent: Yandex LLC
- Website: sdg.yandex.ru/main/index

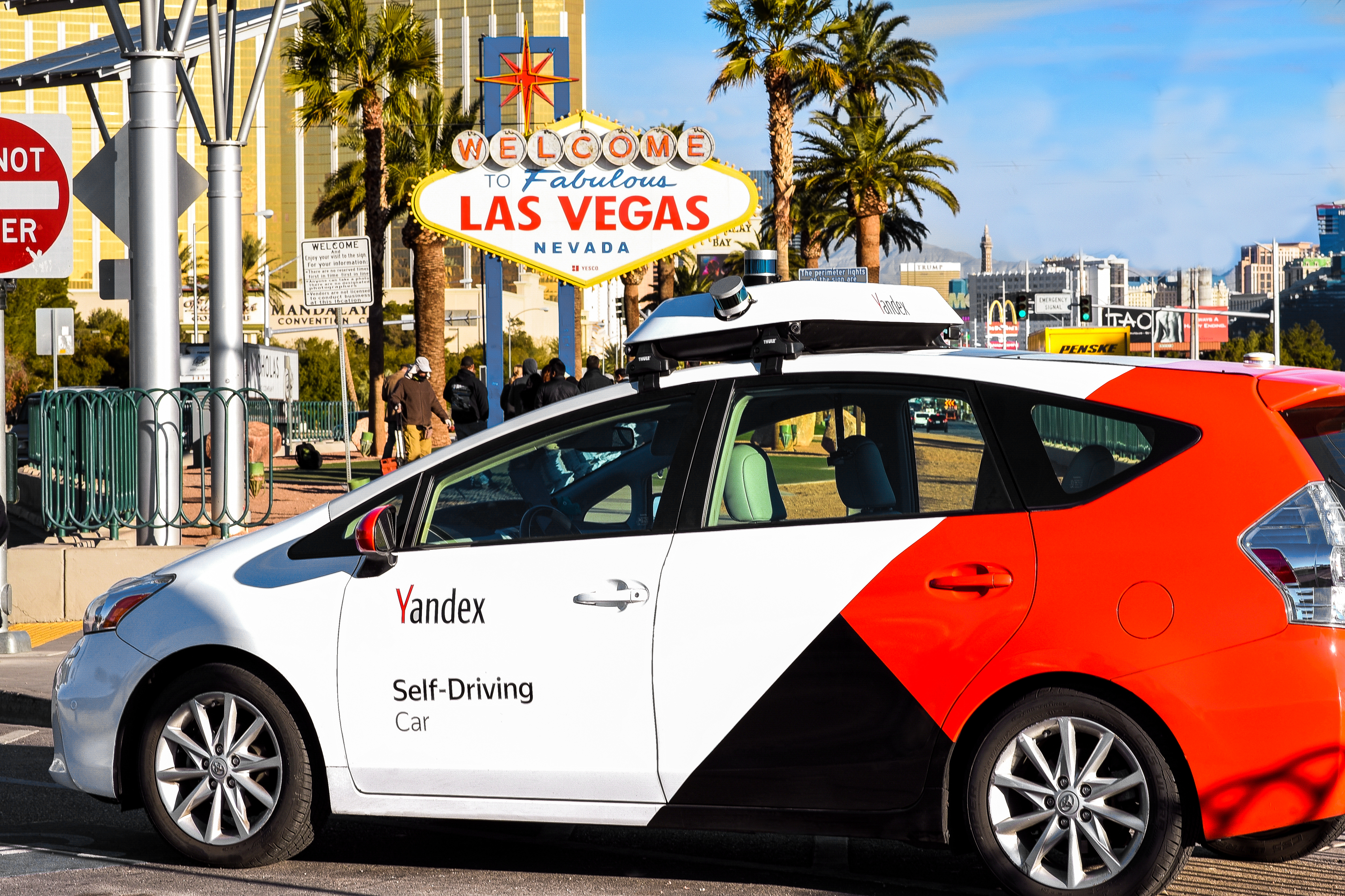
Self-driving car at Consumer Electronics Show in 2019

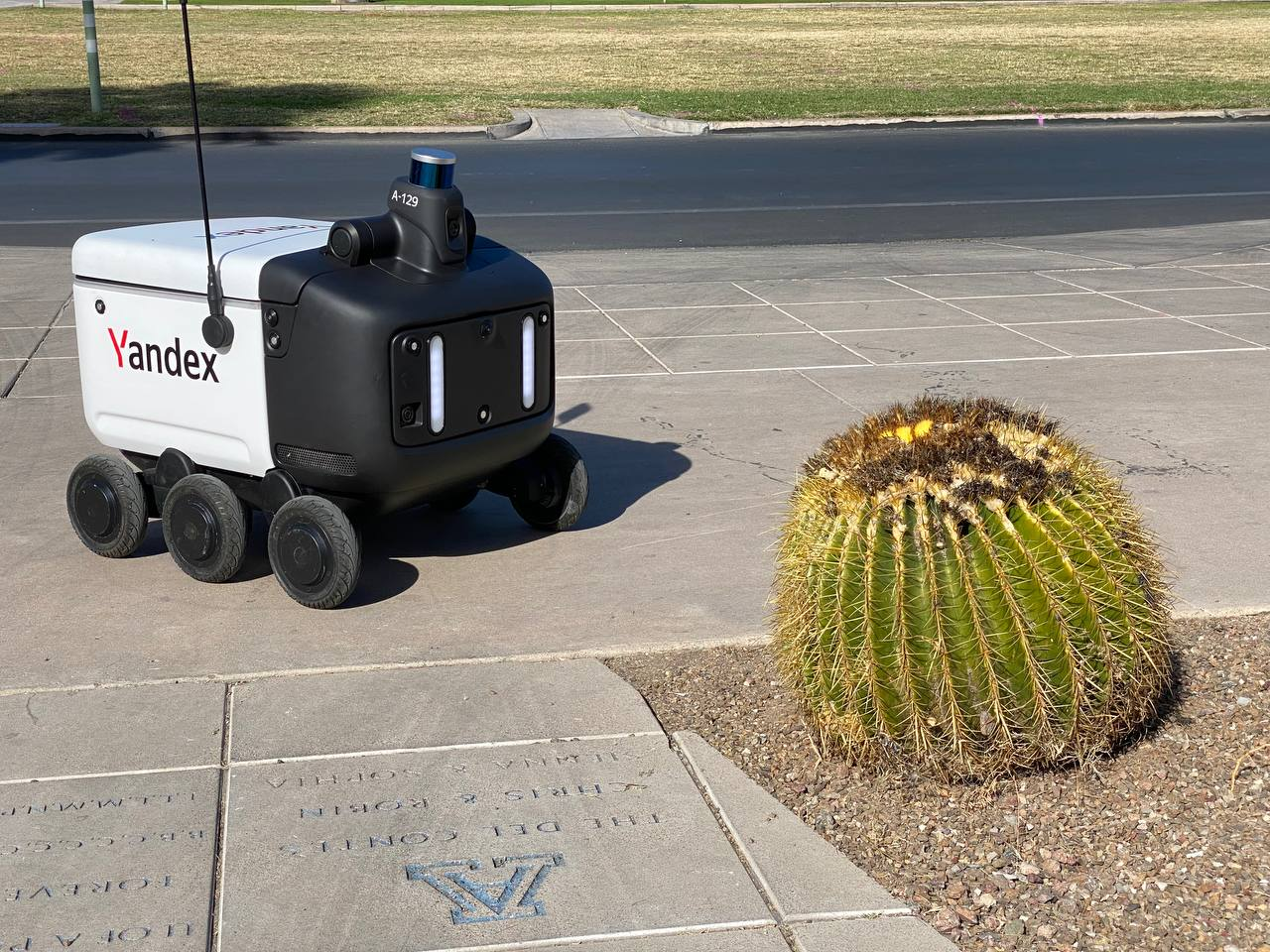
Autonomous delivery robot in Arizona

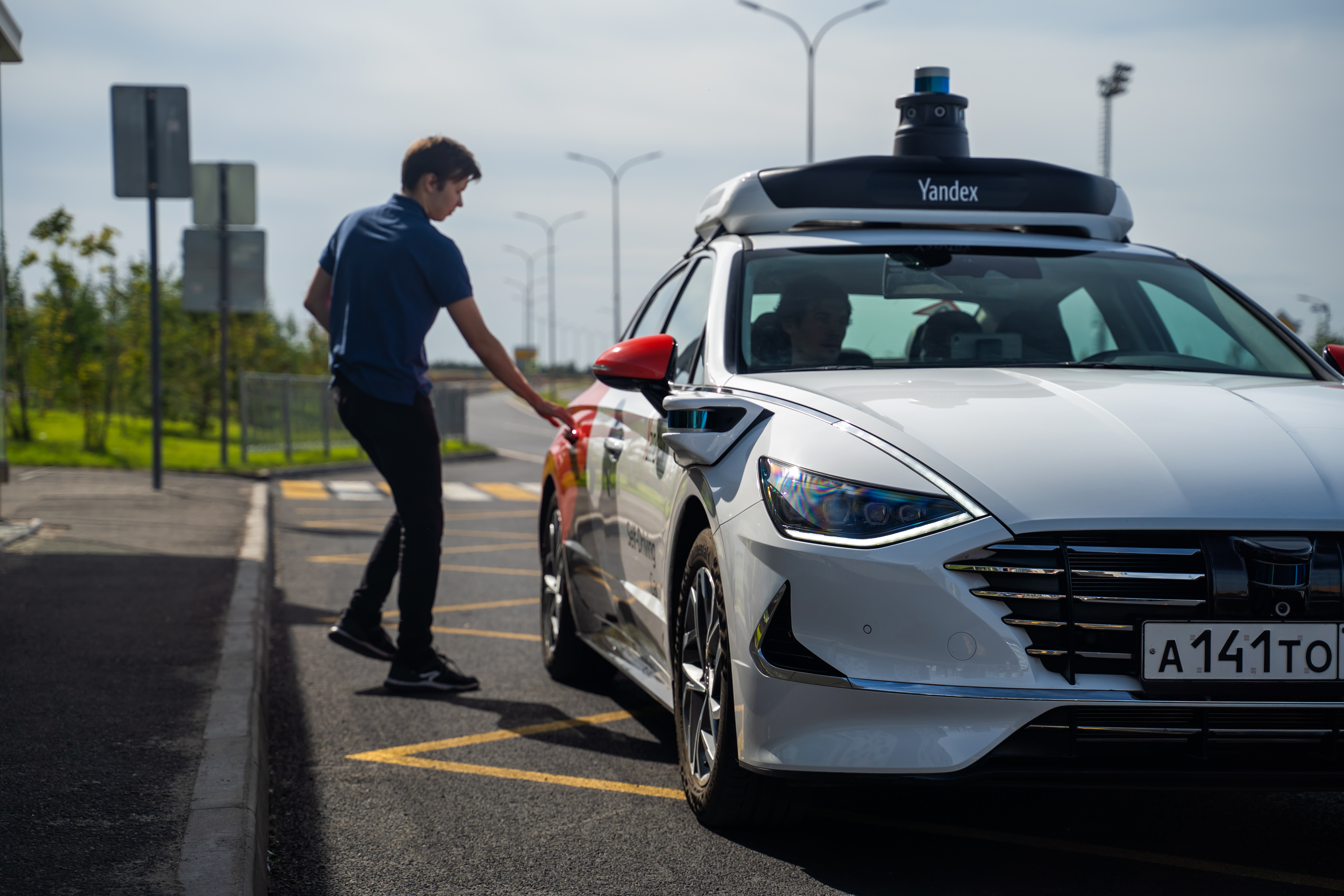
Robotaxi in Innopolis

Yandex Self-Driving Group is a developer of self-driving cars and delivery robots. It is headquartered in Moscow, Russia. Yandex Self-Driving Group is a part of the Russian company Yandex LLC.

The self-driving cars are based on mass-produced car models, such as the Toyota Prius and Hyundai Sonata. Each vehicle is equipped with four proprietary lidars, six radars and from 8 to 12 cameras. The company's semi-solid state lidars can recognize objects as far as 500 meters away and are capable of changing the scanning pattern on-flight. They can increase point cloud density in the area near the vehicle when it is moving through a courtyard, or increase range when driving at a high speed on a highway. The company has specific technologies developed to deal with bad weather. These include lidar cloud filtering from snowflakes reflections, and measuring coefficient of friction for speed and maneuver planning.

The delivery robots operate on the same technology as the company's self-driving cars and are manufactured in Taiwan. Robots are equipped with the same types of sensors as the cars including lidars, radars and cameras, and can reuse localization and perception algorithms developed for cars. Robots also reuse many neural networks, specifically for prediction of other road users’ behavior. These networks were initially developed for cars, and were tested, adapted, and implemented for the robots. Robots move at a speed of 5–8 km/h (3-5 mph), can autonomously navigate crosswalks and recognize traffic lights. Average working time on a single battery charge is about 8–12 hours. The third generation of robots, launched in November 2021, have replaceable batteries.

== History ==
=== 2016-2020 ===
In 2016, a 120-person team at the company began assembling the underlying hardware for self-driving cars.

The company launched its first self-driving car prototype in May 2017.

In June 2017, the company released a video demonstrating its self-driving car technology. The prototype vehicle was a heavily modified Toyota Prius+ hybrid wagon/compact MPV equipped with three Lidar optical distance sensors by Velodyne Lidar, six radar units, and six cameras and a GNSS sensor for navigation, with Intel CPUs and Nvidia GPUs using the GNU operating system with the Linux kernel.

In November 2017, the company tested the car in winter conditions on a closed course. The car drove successfully along snowy roads, despite the increased difficulties presented by the snow. The vehicle covered 300 km.

In February 2018, the company tested the car in snowy conditions on public roads.

Unmanned robo-taxi service was launched on in August 2018 in the university town of Innopolis, Tatarstan. By February 2020, over 5,000 autonomous passenger rides were completed in Innopolis.

In November 2018, the company obtained a license to use its self-driving cars on public roads in Nevada.

In December 2018, the company received permission from the Ministry of Transport and Road Safety in Israel to test its driverless cars on public roads in Tel Aviv. In September, 2019 the testing territory was expanded to include the city center.

In January 2019, demo rides were offered to guests of the Consumer Electronics Show in Las Vegas. Unlike other prototypes demonstrated at the exhibition, the cars operated without any human control. There was no engineer at the wheel, only one in the passenger seat to take control of the car in case of emergency. In January 2020, the company again provided autonomous rides for guests of the convention.

In March 2019, the company partnered with Hyundai Motor Company to develop self-driving car components including control systems for level 4 and level 5, the categories of automation defined as requiring limited to no human intervention, with possible expansions of the venture to areas such as speech, navigation, and mapping technologies, and for technologies for use by other manufacturers. In July 2019, Hyundai Mobis and Yandex presented a self-driving Hyundai Sonata as the first result of the collaboration.

In October 2019, the company's self-driving cars passed 1 million miles in fully autonomous driving.

In November 2019, the company launched delivery robots based on the same technology stack as the company's self-driving cars. Robots were the size of a suitcase and navigated sidewalks at the speed of 5–8 km/h. They were tested on Yandex's campus in Moscow, transporting small packages between buildings.

In April 2020, the company launched delivery robots in Skolkovo, Moscow Oblast for uses by city employees. In May 2020, robots entered their first commercial deployment at the Skolkovo Innovation Center, used for document transportation.

In June 2020, the company presented the fourth generation of its self-driving cars, based on the Hyundai Sonata.

In August 2020, the company opened an autonomous vehicle testing center in Ann Arbor, Michigan.

In September 2020, the self-driving division was spun-off into a standalone company under the name of Yandex Self-Driving Group (Yandex SDG) and Yandex invested $150 million into the company.

In December 2020, robots were used for the Yandex.Eats food delivery service to make food and grocery deliveries in Moscow.

=== 2021-present ===
In August 2021, in partnership with Grubhub, the company launched autonomous delivery robots at Ohio State University for food delivery. In November 2021, the service was launched at the University of Arizona.

Also in August 2021, Yandex acquired Uber's stake in the company as part of a $1 billion transaction.

As of September 2021, the company had around 170 autonomous vehicles in its fleet, which had driven over 14 million kilometers (10 million miles) in Russia, Israel and the United States.

In October 2021, the company partnered with Russian Post and 36 robots started making autonomous deliveries from 27 post offices in Moscow.

In November 2021, the company transitioned to using proprietary lidars on autonomous vehicles.

In March 2022, the company paused operations in the United States, including its robotaxis in Ann Arbor and its partnership with Grubhub, as a result of international sanctions during the Russian invasion of Ukraine.

In June 2024, Yandex announced the creation of a separate brand of self-driving cars and delivery robots — Yandex Self-Driving Group.
