= Yandex Taxi =

Russian taxi service

- Trade name: Yandex Taxi
- Type: Subsidiary
- Industry: Information Technology; Transportation
- Founded: October 26, 2011; 15 years ago
- Founders: Daniil Shuleyko
- Headquarters: Russia
- Key people: Daniil Shuleyko (CEO)
- Revenue: 393.8 billions roubles (4.9 billions $US) (2025)
- Operating income: 42.192 billions roubles (525 millions $US) (2025)
- Net income: 27.324 billions roubles (340 millions $US) (2025)
- Number of employees: 4.820 (2025)
- Parent: Yandex
- Website: taxi.yandex.ru

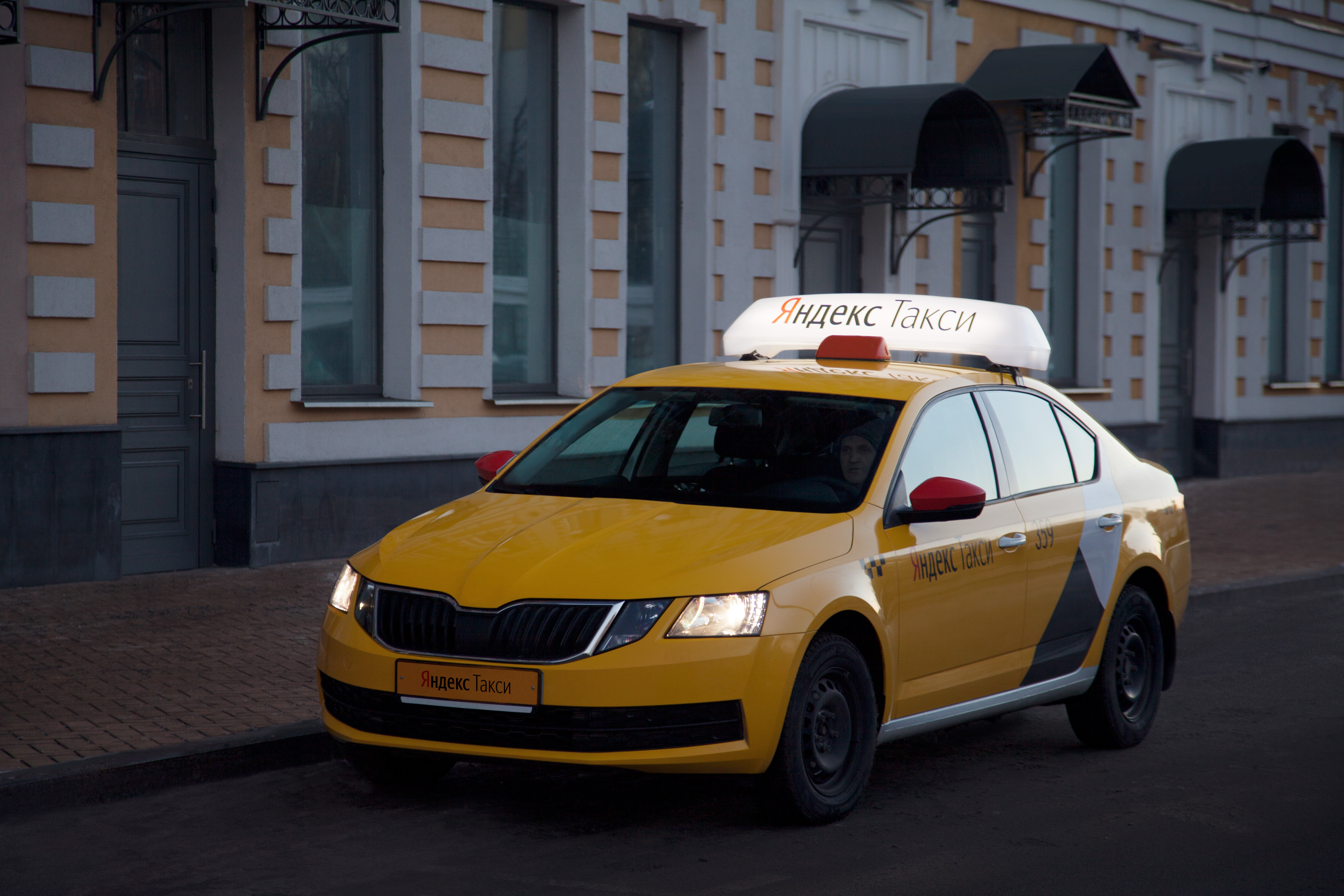
Yandex.Taxi in Moscow, Russia

Yandex Taxi (Russian: Яндекс Такси, romanized: Yandeks Taksi; stylised as Yandex.Taxi), a division of Yandex, operates a ridesharing company in Russia, Moldova, Armenia, Belarus, Georgia, Kyrgyzstan, Serbia, Uzbekistan, Kazakhstan, Tajikistan, Israel and UAE. The Yandex Taxi division also operates Yandex Eda, a food delivery service; Yandex.Lavka, a grocery delivery service; and Yandex.Chef, previously known as Partiya Edy (Russian: "Food Party"), a meal kit service. All services are accessible via the Yandex Go mobile app.

The company is the dominant ridesharing company in the markets in which it operates; it had an 86.3% market share in Uzbekistan in 2023.

== History ==
Yandex.Taxi was launched in Moscow, Russia in 2011.

The service was first introduced as a mobile app for Android and iOS, and a desktop version was launched on 28 June 2012.

In 2012, Yandex.Taxi started charging a commission on rides booked through its service.

Tigran Khudaverdyan became CEO of Yandex Taxi in 2015. On May 22, 2019, Yandex announced the appointment of Tigran Khudaverdyan to the newly created position of Deputy Chief Executive Officer of Yandex.

In 2020, Yandex.Taxi was reportedly developing AI-infused proprietary hardware and software for its vehicles that monitors drivers’ attention levels, as well as a facial recognition system that determines the identity of the person behind the wheel.

In April 2022, Yandex.Taxi was banned in Estonia due to the Russian government's requirement that it share users' personal data with the government. Estonia encouraged other EU countries to sanction the company as well.

In November 2022, Yandex launched shared rides for users from Moscow and St. Petersburg. The trip can be shared with a fellow traveler if you select the "Together" option in the Yandex Go application.

=== Transactions with Uber ===
In February 2018, Yandex acquired Uber's businesses in Russia, Kazakhstan, Azerbaijan, Armenia, Belarus and Georgia.

In August 2021, Yandex acquired Uber's stake its self-driving car division and food delivery business in a $1 billion transaction.

In April 2023, Yandex Taxi acquired Uber's stake in the taxi joint venture for $702.5 million.

=== Food tech division ===
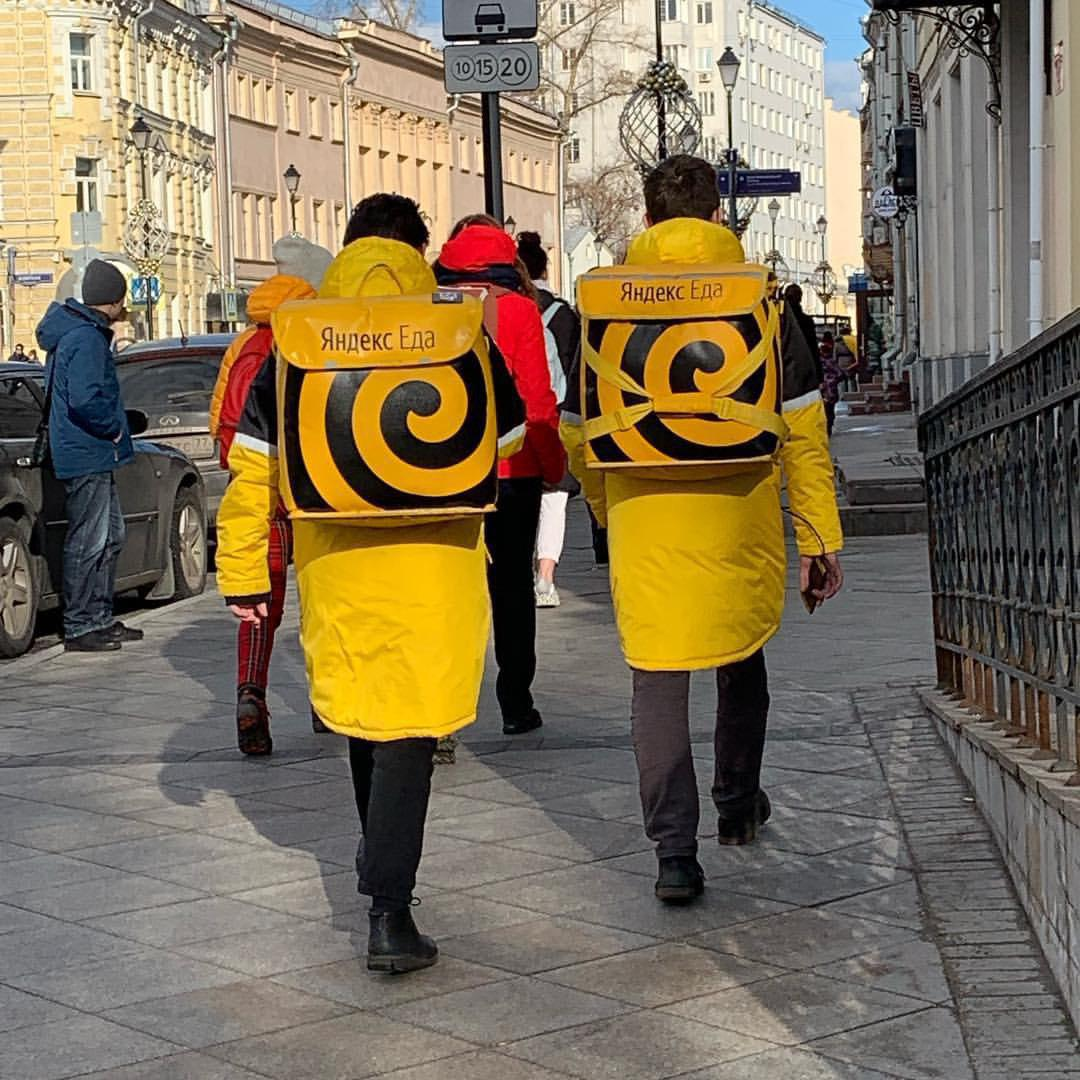
Food delivery men

In December 2017, Yandex.Taxi acquired Foodfox, a food delivery service in Moscow. After the merge of Uber and Yandex.Taxi in March 2018, Uber Eats and Foodfox combined their services to become Yandex Eda.

In February 2018, the Yandex Eats food delivery service was launched.

In October 2018, Yandex acquired Partiya Edy ("Food Party"), a meal kit service that operates in Moscow and St. Petersburg, which was renamed Yandex.Chef.

By December 2018, the company had completed 1 million food delivery orders.

In 2019, Yandex Eats launched a grocery delivery services called Yandex Lavka that delivers to customers in under 15 minutes. The online service relies on small warehouses across Moscow and St. Petersburg stocked with about 2,000 items and uses bike couriers to deliver orders.

== Global expansion ==
As of 2022, Yandex.Taxi operates in more than 1,000 cities, include 300 large cities in Russia, Belarus, Armenia, Kyrgyzstan, Moldova, Georgia, Kazakhstan, Uzbekistan, Serbia. In addition to the taxi service, in some countries, Yandex.Taxi operates food tech, food delivery and cargo platforms.

=== Belarus ===
The service launched on 25 February 2016. It started in Minsk, but now operates in all six regional centers and multiple cities in the country. In March 2019 the service introduced an insurance product for riders and drivers connected to the service.

=== Armenia ===
Operating in 15 of its cities, Yandex.Taxi has one of its most visible presences in Armenia. It started operating in Yerevan on 1 July 2016. In 2017, the service sponsored a computer programming school for high schoolers in Gyumri and Vanadzor.

=== Kazakhstan ===
Kazakhstan is one of the biggest international markets for Yandex.Taxi. Launched in the biggest city Almaty on 28 July 2016, Yandex.Taxi was serving 20 cities by September 2018. On 3 September 2018, Yandex.Taxi introduced an insurance product for riders and drivers connected to the service. Yandex.Taxi also provides corporate taxi services in Kazakhstan. In 2020 Kazakhstan became the first foreign market for the Yandex.Eats food delivery service.

=== Georgia ===
The launch in Georgia on 28 August 2016 was accompanied by scandals pertaining to another Yandex service, Yandex.Maps. The Russian version of Yandex.Maps marks the territories of Abkhazia and South Ossetia as independent countries while Georgian law defines these territories as parts of Georgia. Given that Yandex.Maps wasn't localized for Georgia, everyone saw only the Russian version. Yandex.Taxi marked these territories to comply with Georgian law, unlike Yandex. Maps. Despite the update fact, many locals boycotted the new service. Yandex.Taxi continued operations and still works in present day, adding two more cities to its Georgian network: Batumi and Rustavi.

=== Moldova ===
Yandex.Taxi launched in Chișinău on 24 July 2017. In 2020 it expanded to the city of Bălți.

=== Kyrgyzstan ===
Kyrgyzstan is the second country in Central Asia in which Yandex began to operate. Yandex.Taxi was launched on 9 November 2017 in Bishkek, then later in Osh.

=== Uzbekistan ===
Yandex.Taxi operates in Tashkent, the capital of Uzbekistan, as well as in Fergana and Margilan. The service entered the local market on 4 April 2018.

=== Serbia ===
Serbia is the first country outside the former Soviet republics where Yandex.Taxi began to operate. It launched in Belgrade on 5 June 2018. The service started to operate in Novi Sad in 2021 and in Kragujevac in 2023.

== Former markets ==
=== Lithuania ===
Just after the Lithuanian launch of Yandex.Taxi on 26 July 2018, the country's authorities warned citizens against using the service in order to protect their personal data. Lithuania's National Cyber Security Center (NCSC) highlighted that "it is especially important that this app isn’t used on the devices of Lithuanian civil servants, officials, or national defense system employees." Yandex.Taxi responded that it "processes and stores EU user data strictly according to EU regulations, GDPR in particular," and that the service is "open and ready for any necessary checks." Despite the NCSC's accusations, authorities from two other Baltic states — Latvia and Estonia — did not speak out against Yandex.Taxi.

Lithuanian authorities did not ultimately impose restrictions on the service, and Yandex.Taxi works in the capital city of Vilnius and Kaunas.

=== Estonia ===
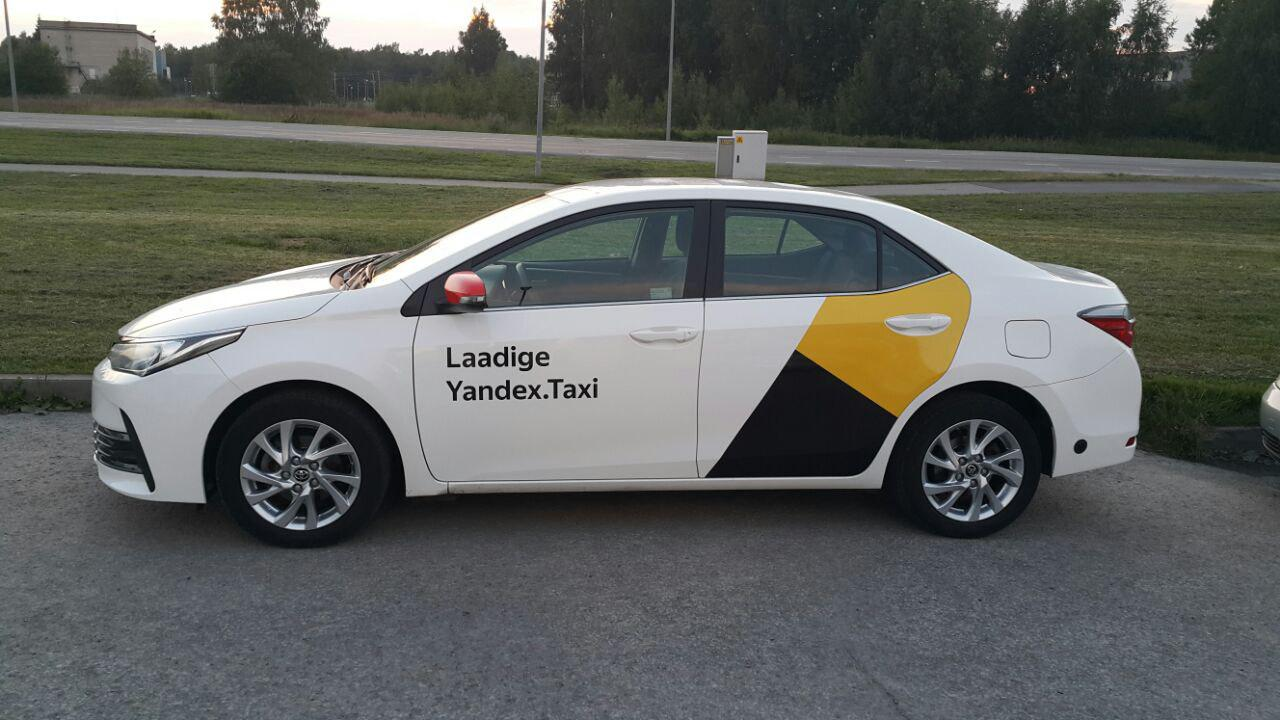
Yandex.Taxi in Estonia

Yandex Taxi launched in the Estonian capital Tallinn on 1 May 2018. On April 11, 2022, Yandex Taxi was banned in Estonia due to the Russian government's collection of user data. Estonian Prime Minister Kaja Kallas and IT and foreign trade minister Andres Sutt said the move related to national security, given that Yandex requires the provision of personal data which would be held in Russia and which Russian security services, including the FSB, have the ability to access, following a decision in Russia.

=== Latvia ===
Latvia was the first Baltic country and the first EU member where Yandex.Taxi started operations. It launched on 15 March 2018, it left in March 2022.

== Revenue and profitability ==
The Yandex Taxi division became profitable in fall 2018.

For 2019, the Yandex Taxi division posted revenues of nearly RUB 38 billion, an increase of 97% from the previous year.

In 2023, Yandex Taxi revenue increased 30.3% to 149.6 billion rubles and net profit rose 21.6% to 31.9 billion rubles.

== Concerns ==
=== Privacy concerns ===
There have been concerns that the government of Russia may be able to access user data, including data from outside Russia.

In July 2018, Lithuanian authorities warned the app could be collecting users' personal data.

In September 2024, The Personal Data Protection Service of Georgia reported that the company's division in Georgia illegally transferred the personal data of its Georgian users of its services to Russia and fined the company GEL 4000.

=== Sharing user data with police ===
In February 2020, Russian news website Baza reported that Yandex.Taxi had disclosed the travel history of an investigative journalist to Moscow police without a court order. The company responded that it was legally compelled to hand over the data under Russia's “operative-search activities” law, which does not require a court decision to request ride histories.

== See also ==
- Yandex self-driving car
- Taxi Maxim
- Yango Group
- Uber
- Lyft
- DiDi
- Bolt
