= Mpoti =

- Location in Togo
- Coordinates: 8°14′N 0°46′E
- Country: Togo
- Region: Centrale Region
- Prefecture: Sotouboua
- Time zone: UTC + 0

Mpoti is a village in the Sotouboua prefecture in the Centrale Region of Togo.
