= Morita, Togo =

Coordinates: 08°06′00″N 01°21′00″E

Morita is a town in Plateaux Region, Togo.

== Transport ==
It has been proposed to build a station connecting this town to the national railway network.

== See also ==
- Railway stations in Togo
