= Ayengre =

Adjengere Ayengre or Adjengre oe Agjengere
- Location in Togo
- Coordinates: 8°38′27″N 1°1′38″E
- Country: Togo
- Region: Centrale Region

Adjengere (also known as Adjengré or Ayengre) is a town in the Sotouboua Prefecture of Centrale Region, Togo.
