= Al Aqabah (disambiguation) =

Aqaba or Al Aqaba or Al Aqabah may refer to:

== Place ==
- Aqaba, Jordan
- Aqabah, West Bank
- The Gulf of Aqaba, at the northern end of the Red Sea

== Events ==
- Second pledge at al-Aqabah
