= Yandex Eda =

Russian online food delivery service

Yandex.Eats
- Trade name: Yandex.Eda
- Type: Subsidiary
- Industry: Online food ordering
- Founded: January 2018; 8 years ago
- Area served: Russia; Armenia; Kazakhstan; Belarus; Uzbekistan; Georgia
- Revenue: 144.6 billions roubles (1.8 billions $US) (2025)
- Owner: Yandex
- Number of employees: 1,021 (2025)
- Parent: Yandex.Eda, LLC (Yandex Taxi)
- Website: eda.yandex.ru

Yandex Eats (Russian: Яндекс Еда, romanized: Yandeks Eda; stylised as Yandex.Eda), a part of Yandex Taxi, which is in turn a division of Yandex, operates a food delivery service. It is accessible via the Yandex Go mobile app.

Yandex.Eats operates in Russia, Kazakhstan, Armenia, Georgia, and Uzbekistan. Yandex.Eats works with more than 33,000 restaurants.

== History ==
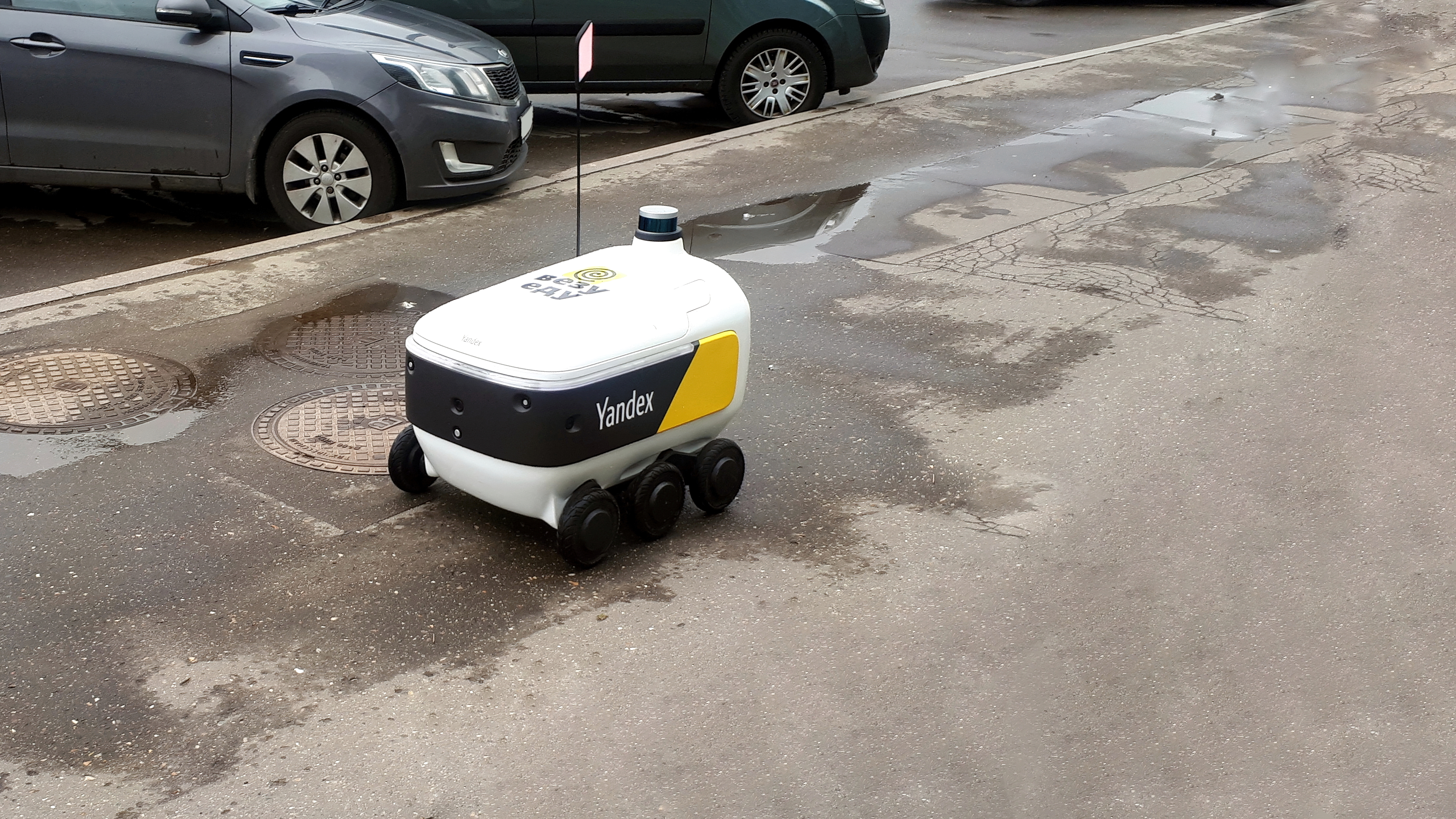
Yandex delivery robot during the first race in a real setting (January 2021).

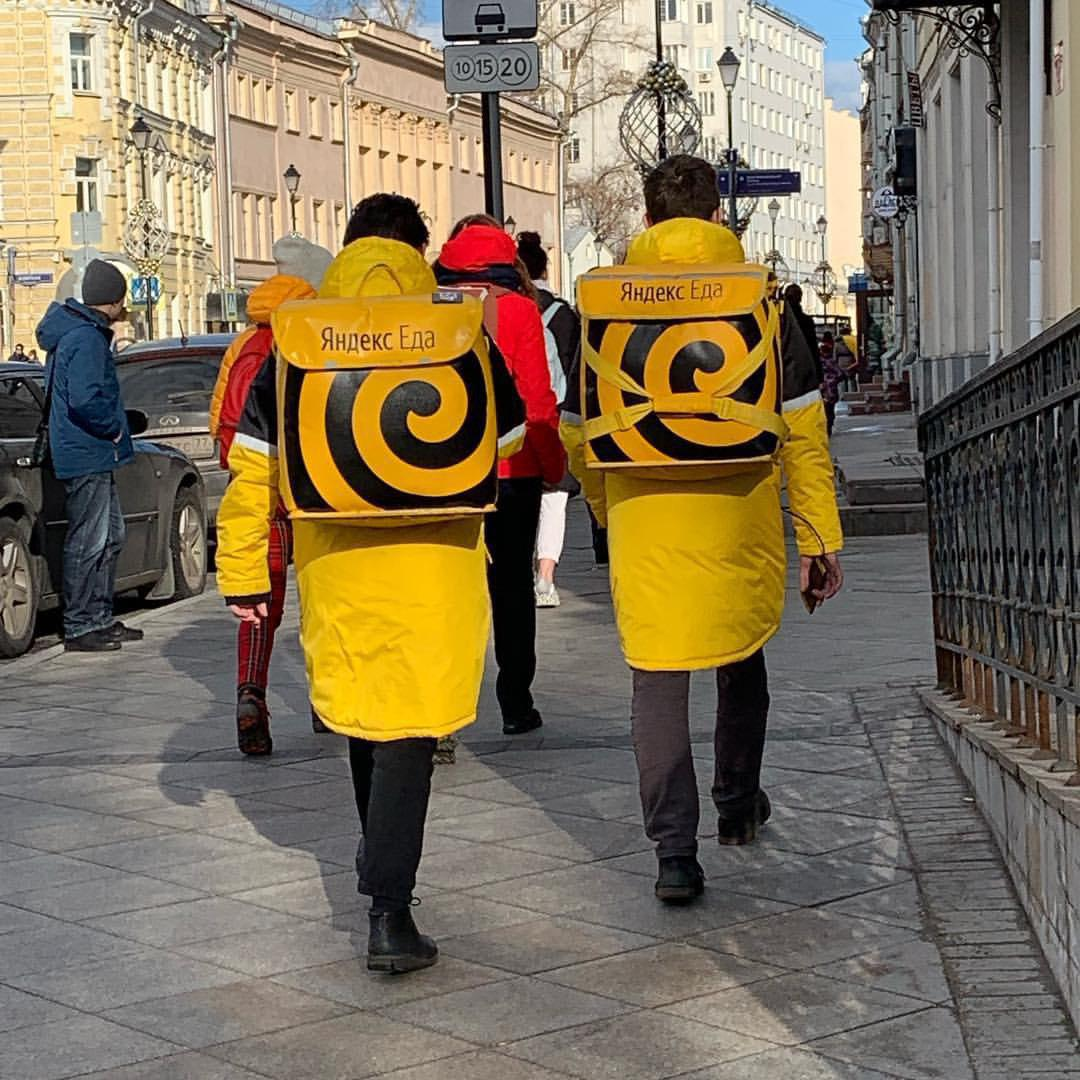
Yandex.Eda food delivery men in Moscow. (2019)

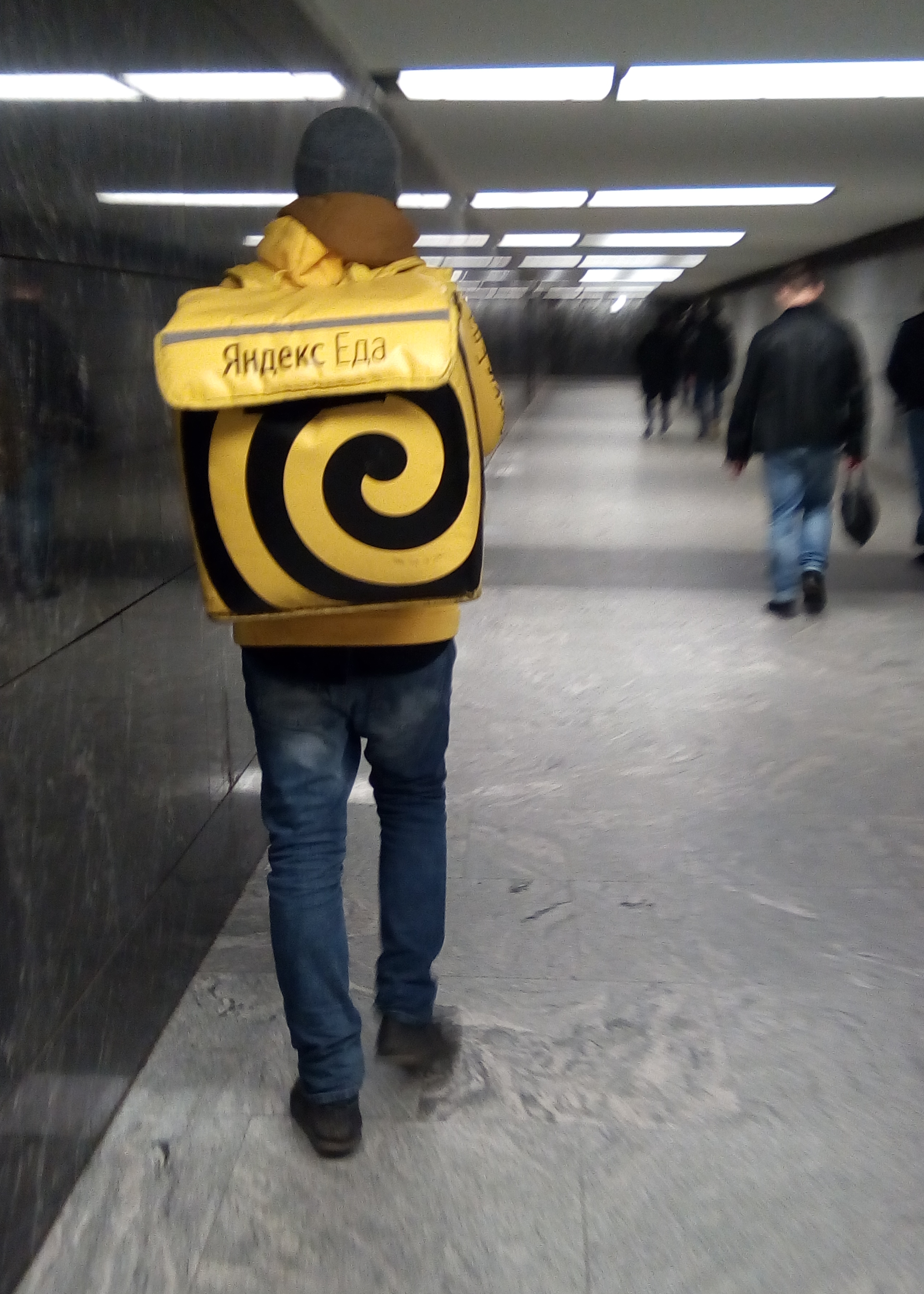
Delivery by Yandex.Eda courier in Moscow Metro (2019)

In December 2017, Yandex.Taxi acquired Foodfox, a food delivery service in Moscow.

In February 2018, the Yandex Eats food delivery service was launched.

After Yandex.Taxi acquired Uber's operations in Russia and neighboring countries in March 2018, Uber Eats and Foodfox combined their services.

In October 2018, Yandex acquired Partiya Edy ("Food Party"), a meal kit service that operates in Moscow and St. Petersburg, which was renamed Yandex.Chef.

By December 2018, the company had completed 1 million food delivery orders.

In 2019, Yandex Eats launched a grocery delivery services called Yandex Lavka that delivers to customers in under 15 minutes. The online service relies on small warehouses across Moscow and St. Petersburg stocked with about 2,000 items and uses bike couriers to deliver orders.

Yandex.Eats launched operations in Armenia in September 2022, Uzbekistan in March 2023, and Georgia in October 2024.

In March 2025, Yandex Eats launched a delivery service for household appliances and electronics (such as smartphones and laptops), excluding large-sized items, in particular from the M.video retail chain.

== Controversies ==
=== Death of delivery driver ===
On April 19, 2019, following a ten-hour shift delivering food, 21-year-old courier Artyk Orozaliev collapsed and died. After the incident, the company launched an internal review and contacted the family of the deceased and offered financial assistance. A medical examination found that the death was due to heart failure. Yandex changed the mechanism for choosing breaks for couriers: according to the new scheme, it became enough to press the pause button in the application. Previously, it was necessary to chat with the supervisor and wait for his permission to take a break. This was done in order to avoid the influence of the human factor when the courier needs a break.
