= Sotouboua =

- Location in Togo
- Coordinates: 08°34′00″N 00°59′00″E
- Country: Togo
- Region: Centrale Region

Population (2022)
  - Total: 32,464

Sotouboua is a town located in Sotouboua Prefecture in the Centrale Region of Togo. The town has a population of 32,464 (2022).

== Climate ==
Climate data for Sotouboua (1991-2020)
Month	Jan	Feb	Mar	Apr	May	Jun	Jul	Aug	Sep	Oct	Nov	Dec	Year
Average precipitation mm (inches)	4.5 (0.18)	15.7 (0.62)	55.9 (2.20)	112.9 (4.44)	137.1 (5.40)	172.6 (6.80)	204.4 (8.05)	248.6 (9.79)	240.0 (9.45)	111.9 (4.41)	11.7 (0.46)	4.4 (0.17)	1,319.7 (51.96)
Average precipitation days (≥ 1 mm)	0.5	1.8	5.1	8.7	10.9	13.7	17.4	18.2	17.8	10.0	1.2	0.4	105.7
Source: NOAA

== Transport ==
Sotouboua is the apparent railway terminus in the north.

== Accident ==
On 6 December 1965, two trucks crashed into a crowd of dancers, killing 125 people. This was one of the worst road accidents in the country on record.

== See also ==
- List of road accidents
- Railway stations in Togo
