= Yango Group =

Rideshare app

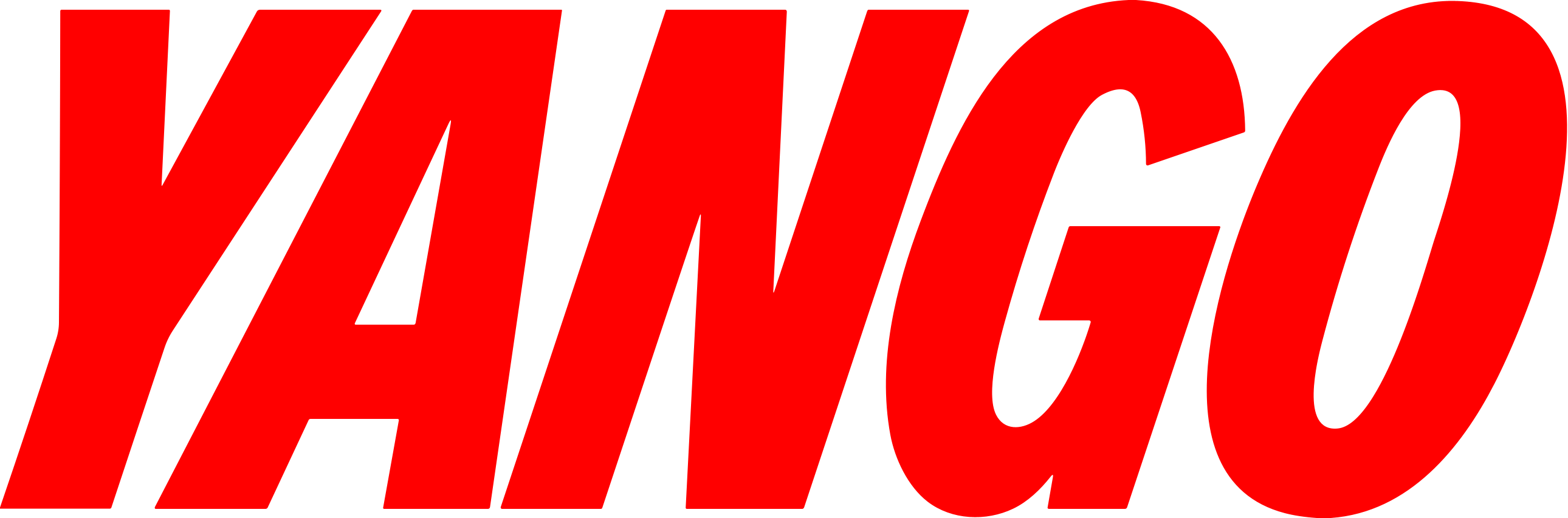
- Founded: October 2018; 7 years ago
- Headquarters: Dubai
- Area served: Over 30 countries
- Industry: Industry Tech company
- Website: yango.com

Yango Group is a company that provides ride-hailing, public transport data, delivery, e-grocery, adtech, maps, entertainment services, AI voice assistant and others.

The company is headquartered in Dubai and operates in more than 30 countries in Europe, Africa, the Middle East, South Asia, and South America. CEO of Yango Group is Daniil Shuleyko.

== History ==
Yango initially started in 2018 as a brand developed by the team of Yandex Taxi and managed by Ridetech International B.V., a subsidiary of Yandex N.V., a Netherlands-registered holding company for the Russian IT conglomerate Yandex LLC. As of now Yango Group operates independently with HQ in Dubai.

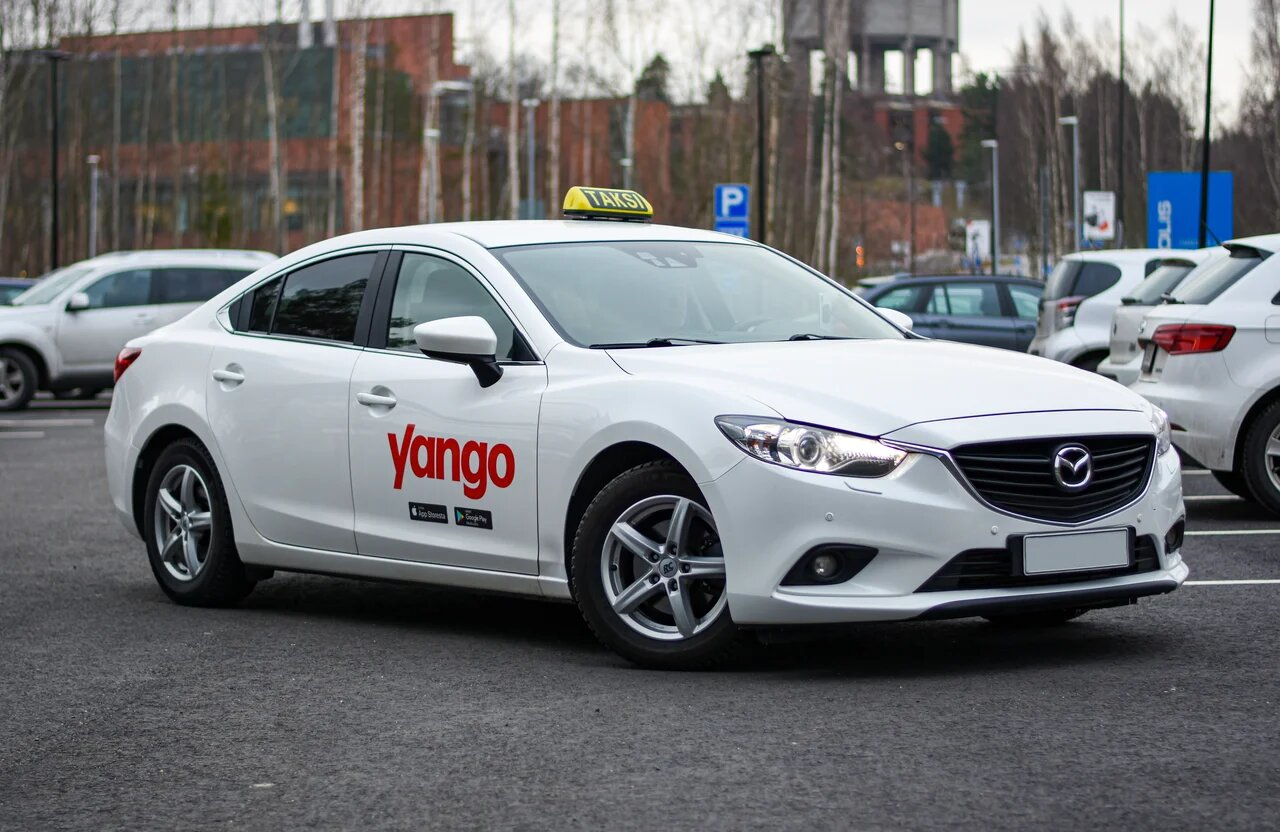
A Yango car in Espoo, Finland (2020).

Since its inception, the company’s flagship service Yango Ride has grown to operate in more than 25 countries. Its business model focuses on collaborating with local taxi companies, enhancing their efficiency through technology rather than owning vehicles or employing drivers directly. Yango Ride works with local taxi companies and technology partners in its initial markets.

Yango has diversified its operations beyond ride-hailing to include sectors such as mapping, mobility, entertainment, robotics, AI smart devices and so on.

=== Africa ===
Yango Ride's beta app was launched in Abidjan, Ivory Coast on October 4, 2018.

Since then Yango Ride has expanded to more African countries, including Ghana in 2019, Senegal and Cameroon in 2021, Angola, DRC, Mozambique and Zambia in 2022, Namibia, Ethiopia and Morocco in 2023.

In November 2021, street-hailing drivers of Ivory Coast organized strikes against Yango blaming the company for working with VTC drivers, which has been outside the scope of the current legislation in the country. Later the VTC concept had been introduced to the legislation, providing Yango and other ride-hailing services in the market with opportunity to obtain temporary licenses.

Item delivery started to roll out in Africa in 2022 with Ivory Coast being the first market.

In 2023, the company launched its food delivery business in Abidjan, Ivory Coast, and Lusaka, Zambia. Then the development of the superapp began, which as of 2025 includes services such as Yango Ride, Yango Delivery, Food Delivery, Buy & Sell, Navigator, Places and Games. Later in 2023, Yango ride-hailing business started operations in Ethiopia, hitting one million users in less than a year since its launch.

In December 2024, Beninese authorities suspended Yango Ride, accusing it of operating without authorization, and asked the company to regularize this situation "within two months".

Yango Group participates in education and technology programs in some African countries. In Cameroon, the company aids programs like Technovation Cameroon, helping young girls explore tech innovation.

=== Asia and the Middle East ===
In 2022, the company introduced Yango Deli Tech (later rebranding to Yango Tech) in GCC. Yango Tech offers technology services to retailers and E-commerce companies. As of 2024, the company partnered with Nana, Al Sadhan, and Spar among others.

In 2022, its ride-hailing service was rolled out in Azerbaijan and Dubai, UAE. As of September 2024, the service was also launched in Abu Dhabi in partnership with Abu Dhabi Mobility.

In May 2025, Yango began to offer its trial services in Nepal and at full scale it was launched later on. It has become popular and has got higher marker share in Nepal.

In 2023, the company’s ride-hailing service became available in Pakistan, the car rental service Yango Drive went live in Dubai, and Yango Tech expanded to Turkey, partnering with PtteM.

Later that year Yango launched Yasmina, an Arabic-speaking, human-like AI assistant.

In September 2023, Yango Tech expanded to India. In 2024 the latter partnered with a chain of grocery stores Bombay Gourmet in India.

In November 2023, the company introduced its navigation app Yango Maps in Dubai.

In the beginning of 2024 Yango launched Yango Play, an entertainment super app, in seven MENA countries, including UAE, Kuwait and Egypt.

In May 2024, Yango introduced its AI-driven warehouse robotics and pick-and-place solutions in Dubai.

In December 2024, Yango Ads, the advertising platform of the Yango Group, signed a partnership agreement with Landmark Reach, the retail media division of Landmark Group.

Yango Ads is also being used to promote tourism services in Thailand, with advertising spend in fourth quarter of 2024 rising by 17% compared to the same period in 2023. The platform has also partnered with the Thai Hotels Association, which represents over 4,000 hotels of various sizes and categories.

Yango’s ride-hailing business was officially launched in Israel on December 10, 2018. Yango's beta ride-hailing app was installed by 100,000 users in the first two weeks. In 2024 the company had sold its ride-hailing business in Israel to local investors.

In 2025, Yango divested its remaining operations in Israel, transferring them to local franchise partners and thereby exiting the market entirely.

=== Latin America ===
Yango functions as a super-app in Bolivia, Peru, Guatemala, and Colombia. Depending on the country, the super-app includes services such as food delivery, item delivery, transport, buy&sell, navigation and ads.

The company began its expansion into South America in August 2022 with the launch of its ride-hailing service in Bolivia, starting in La Paz and Santa Cruz.

In 2023, Yango entered Guatemala with the launch of ride-hailing service. Also that year Yango Ride appeared in Peru, and then the company extended with delivery, public transport data, maps and navigation in the country.

Same year Yango also entered Colombia, offering Yango Ride in Medellin, Cali, Barranquilla, Cucuta and Bucaramanga. In 2024 the company scaled its operations by introducing Yango Transport and Yango Delivery, solidifying its position as a super-app and multi-service provider in the Colombian market.

=== Europe ===
In November 2018 Yango expanded to Finland. Finland's largest national newspaper Helsingin Sanomat recommended not to download the app due to security risks from data collection. Following an investigation, the Finnish Communications Regulatory Authority found that Yango's terms of service were essentially the same as Uber's. Soon after, Helsingin Sanomat published a follow-up article comparing permission rights requested by various taxi applications and placed Yango second after Uber.

In 2021, Yango launched its ride-hailing platform in Norway and rolled out its grocery delivery service in Paris and London.

In 2022, the company closed express delivery services for groceries in Britain and France, shifting to a B2B model focused on Q-commerce, e-commerce, and retail solutions under the Yango Tech brand.

In August 2023 the Norwegian and Finnish data privacy authorities told Yango to stop processing data about their citizens in Russia, after the Russian government introduced a legal duty for the company to deliver personal information to the Russian Federal Security Service. However, the Finnish regulator later clarified that the legislation did not apply to taxi services, leading to the decision not to enforce the ban. Similarly, Norway, which had considered implementing a comparable ban, chose not to issue a formal order. As of 2025, the service continues to operate in both countries.

== See also ==
- Yandex Taxi
