= Transport in Togo =

Transportation in the country of Togo is by road, rail, water or air. In 2025, the country launched a study to develop plans to modernize its road network.

== Railways ==

total: 568 km (2008)
narrow gauge: 568 km of 1,000 mm (3 ft 3 3/8 in) gauge

== Roadways ==
total: 7,520 km
paved: 2,376 km
unpaved: 5,144 km (2000)

The Trans–West African Coastal Highway crosses Togo, connecting it to Benin and Nigeria to the east, and Ghana and Ivory Coast to the west. When construction in Liberia and Sierra Leone is finished, the highway will continue west to seven other Economic Community of West African States (ECOWAS) nations. A paved highway also connects Togo northwards to Burkina Faso and from there north-west to Mali and north-east to Niger.

In 2024, the Russian ride-hailing app Yango was shut down in the country by the Ministry of Transport after concerns for passenger safety. The app began operating in the country four months previously, without prior authorization.

In 2025, the country announced plans to digitize all SOTRAL bus ticket sales in the country by 2026.

== Waterways ==
50 km (seasonally navigable by small craft on the Mono River depending on rainfall. (2011))

== Ports and harbours ==
The port of Lomé is Togo's principal seaport and one of the few natural deep-water ports on the West African coast, serving as a transit gateway for the landlocked countries of Mali, Niger and Burkina Faso. Its Lomé Container Terminal (LCT), operated under a 35-year concession by Terminal Investment Limited (TiL), the terminal-operating arm of MSC, has a 16.6-metre draught and a 1,050-metre quay able to handle container ships of up to 24,000 TEU, with an annual capacity of about 2.2 million TEU, making Lomé a major transshipment hub for the region.

- Kpémé
- Lomé - railhead

== Merchant marine ==
total: 62 ships
ships by type: bulk carrier 6, cargo 38, carrier 3, chemical tanker 5, container 3, passenger/cargo 1, petroleum tanker 3, refrigerated cargo 1, roll on/roll off 1 (2010)

== Airports ==
8 (2012)

=== Airports - with paved runways ===
total: 2
2,438 to 3,047 m: 2 (2012)

- Lomé-Tokoin Airport
- Niamtougou International Airport

In 2024, the Togo cooperated with Chinese partners to redevelop and modernize the country's capital airport.

=== Airports - with unpaved runways ===
total: 6
914 to 1,523 m: 4
under 914 m: 2 (2012)
