= Akaba, Togo =

Town in Togo

Coordinates: 07°57′00″N 01°03′00″E

Akaba is a small town in central Togo. It is in the northern Plateaux Region near the border of the Centrale Region.

In the early French occupation, the Kabye people were forcibly moved which led them to create new towns, Akaba being one.

== Transport ==
It is served by a station on the Togo Railway network.

== See also ==
- Railway stations in Togo
