= Akaba (surname) =

Akaba is a surname. Notable people with the surname include:

- Henriette Akaba (born 1992), Cameroonian football forward
- Kazuyoshi Akaba (赤羽 一嘉, born 1958), Japanese politician
- Natella Akaba (Нателла Акаба, born 1945), Abkhaz historian, politician and civil society leader
- Osumana Akaba (born 1980), Ghanaian boxer
- Yukiko Akaba (赤羽 有紀子, born 1979), Japanese long-distance runner
