= Cinkassé =

- Location in Togo
- Coordinates: 11°6′2″N 0°0′48″E
- Country: Togo
- Region: Savanes
- Prefecture: Cinkassé
- Time zone: UTC±00:00 (GMT)

Cinkassé is a town in Togo on the borders with Burkina Faso and Ghana. It lies about 38 km from Dapaong, and just over the border from the town of Cinkansé, Burkina Faso.

== Transport ==
It is proposed to be the location of a dry port, particularly as it will be connected with the port of Lomé by an extended railway. The current railway finishes at Blitta.

== See also ==
- Railway stations in Togo
