= List of websites about food and drink =

This is a list of websites about food and drink.

== Websites about food and drink ==
- African Food Network
- ChefsFeed
- Cooking Channel (defunct)
- The Daily Meal
- Eater.com
- Food Network
- Food.com
- Freezerburns
- HungryGoWhere
- Just A Pinch Recipes
- LocalEats
- The Packer
- Pimp That Snack
- OpenRice
- Serious Eats
- Smitten Kitchen
- Sprudge
- Tasting Table
- This is why you're fat
- Urbanspoon (defunct)
- Yummly (defunct)
- Cucumbertown
- Epicurious
- FoodPair
- Meishichina
- My Drunk Kitchen
- MSN Food & Drink
- NeverSeconds
- PlateCulture
- RecipeBridge
- Simply Recipes

== Online food ordering ==
- Bolt
- DASHED
- DoorDash
- Deliveroo
- Delivery Hero
- Delivery.com
- EasyPizza
- EatStreet
- Ele.me
- Foodhub
- Foodler
- Foodpanda / hellofood
- Glovo
- Grab
- GrubHub
- Hungryhouse
- Just Eat
- Menulog
- OpenRest
- Pathao
- Seamless
- Swiggy
- Takeaway.com
- Too Good To Go
- Uber Eats
- Waiter.com
- Yemeksepeti
- Zomato

== Wine websites ==
- American Winery Guide
- Bottlenotes
- Bourgogne Live
- Snooth
- Vinopedia.hr
- Vivino
- Wine Folly

== Restaurant reservations ==
- Open Table
- Resy
- Eveve

== See also ==
- List of films about cooking
- List of films about food and drink
- List of food and drink magazines
- Lists of websites
