= Cantor Fitzgerald =

American financial services company

Cantor Fitzgerald, L.P.
- Type: Limited partnership
- Industry: Financial services Investment banking
- Founded: 1945; 81 years ago
- Headquarters: New York City, U.S.
- Key people: Brandon Lutnick (Chairman); Pascal Bandelier, Sage Kelly, and Christian Wall (co-CEOs)
- Number of employees: 12,000
- Website: www.cantorfitzgerald.com

Cantor Fitzgerald, L.P. is an American financial services firm that was founded in 1945. Cantor Fitzgerald's 1,600 employees work in more than 30 locations, including financial centers in the Americas, Europe, Asia–Pacific, and the Middle East. Together with its affiliates, Cantor Fitzgerald operates in more than 60 offices in 20 countries and has more than 12,000 employees. The firm controls two publicly traded companies: the Newmark Group and BGC Group.

Until 2001, the company's headquarters were between the 101st and 105th floors of the North Tower of the World Trade Center in New York City, just above the impact site of American Airlines Flight 11 during the September 11 attacks. 658 Cantor Fitzgerald employees who were present that day were killed, representing the largest loss of life among any single organization in the attacks.

The company was headed by Bernie Cantor from its founding to his death in 1996. From 1996 to 2025, the company was headed by Howard Lutnick, until he took the position of United States secretary of commerce in the second Donald Trump administration. Since 2025, the company has been headed by Lutnick's sons, Brandon and Kyle, who are in their 20s. During his time in the Trump administration, Lutnick has promoted projects that benefit Cantor Fitzgerald, raising conflict of interest questions. 2025 was the firm's most profitable year in its history.

== Early history ==
Cantor Fitzgerald was formed in 1945 by Bernard Gerald Cantor and John Fitzgerald as an investment bank and brokerage business.

In 1965, Cantor Fitzgerald began "large block" sales/trading of equities for institutional customers. It became the world's first electronic marketplace for US government securities in 1972, and in 1983 it was the first to offer worldwide screen brokerage services in US government securities, becoming in time the market's premier government securities dealer.

In 1991, Howard Lutnick was named president and CEO of Cantor Fitzgerald; he became chairman of Cantor Fitzgerald, L.P., in 1996.

In 1999, eSpeed, an electronic bond trading platform, became publicly traded.

== September 11 attacks ==
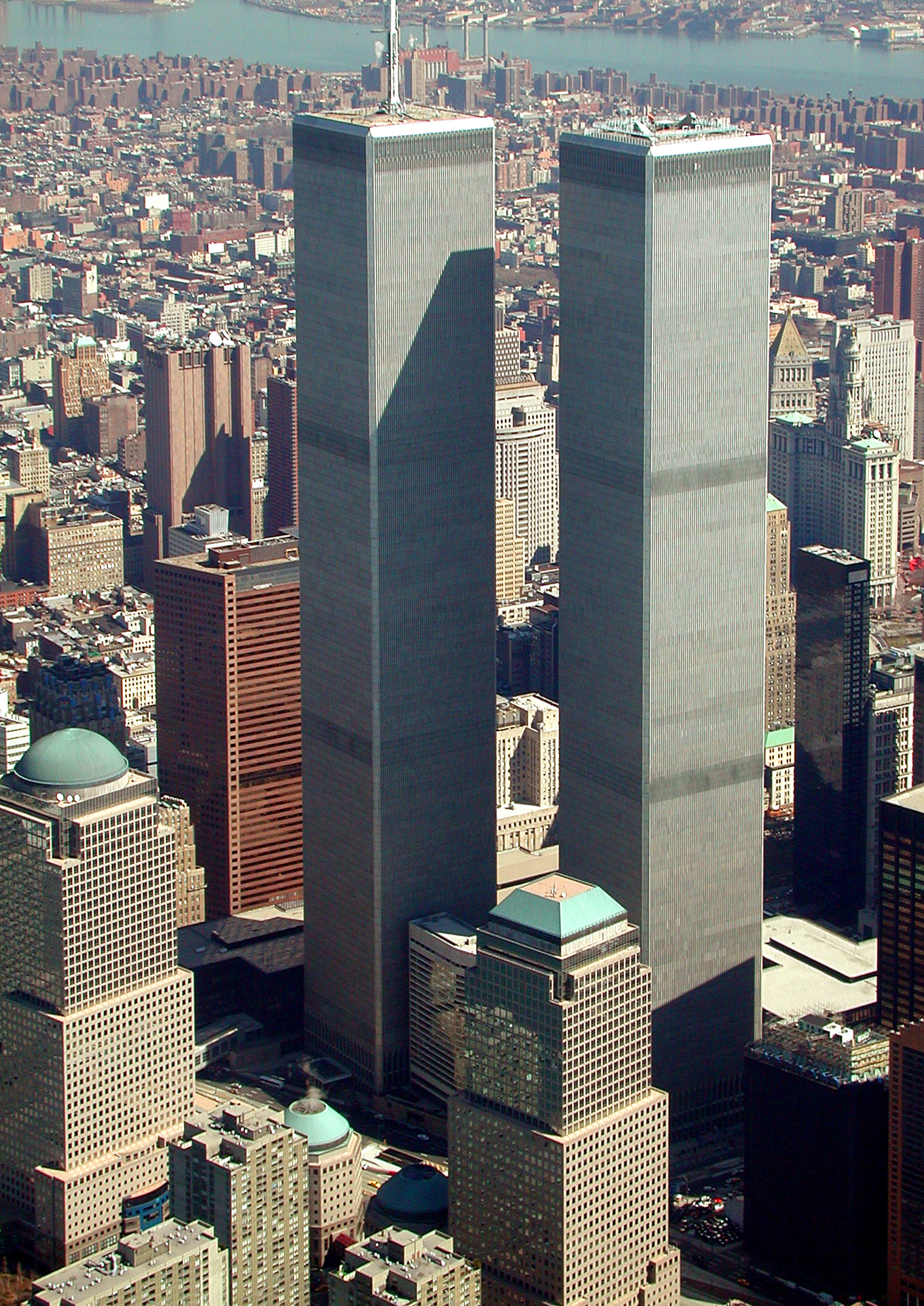
1 World Trade Center (North Tower), the building with the antenna to the left, included the corporate headquarters of Cantor Fitzgerald.

Cantor Fitzgerald's corporate headquarters and New York City office, on the 101st to the 105th floors of 1 World Trade Center in Lower Manhattan (2 to 6 floors above the impact zone of American Airlines Flight 11), were destroyed during the September 11 attacks. At 8:46:46 a.m, six seconds after the plane struck the tower, a Goldman Sachs server issued an alert saying that its trading system had gone offline because it could not connect with the server. Since all stairwells leading past the impact zone were destroyed by the initial crash or blocked with smoke, fire, or debris, every employee who reported for work that morning located in Cantor's offices between the 101st to the 105th floors (Note: The only surviving Cantor Fitzgerald employees were those who were not present at the offices when the plane impacted, such as Lauren Manning.) was killed in the attacks; 658 of its 960 New York employees were killed or missing, or 68.5% of its total workforce, which was considerably more than any of the other World Trade Center tenants, the New York City Police Department, the Port Authority Police Department, the New York City Fire Department, or the Department of Defense. Forty-six contractors, food service workers, and visitors in the Cantor Fitzgerald offices at the time were also killed. CEO Howard Lutnick was not present that day, but his younger brother, Gary, was among those killed. Lutnick vowed to keep the company alive, and the company was able to bring its trading markets back online within a week.

On September 19, Cantor Fitzgerald made a pledge to distribute 25% of the firm's profits for the next five years (that would otherwise have been distributed to its partners), and committed to paying for ten years of health care for the benefit of the families of its 658 former Cantor Fitzgerald, eSpeed, and TradeSpark employees. In 2006, the company had completed its promise, having paid a total of $180 million (and an additional $17 million from a relief fund run by Lutnick's sister, Edie).

Until the attacks, Cantor had handled about a quarter of the daily transactions in the multi-trillion dollar treasury security market. Cantor Fitzgerald subsequently rebuilt its infrastructure, partly through the efforts of its London office, and moved its headquarters to Midtown Manhattan. The company's effort to regain its footing was the subject of Tom Barbash's 2003 book On Top of the World: Cantor Fitzgerald, Howard Lutnick, and 9/11: A Story of Loss and Renewal and the 2012 documentary Out of the Clear Blue Sky.

On September 2, 2004, Cantor and other organizations sued Saudi Arabia for allegedly providing money to the hijackers and al-Qaeda. It was later joined in the suit by the Port Authority of New York and New Jersey. Most of the claims against Saudi Arabia were dismissed on January 18, 2005.

In December 2013, Cantor Fitzgerald settled its lawsuit against American Airlines for $135 million. Cantor Fitzgerald had been suing for loss of property and interruption of business by alleging the airline was negligent by allowing hijackers to board Flight 11.

== Recent history ==
In 2003, the firm launched its fixed-income sales and trading group. Three years later, the Federal Reserve added Cantor Fitzgerald & Co. to its list of primary dealers. The firm launched Cantor Prime Services in 2009. It was meant to be a provider of multi-asset, perimeter brokerage prime brokerage platforms to exploit its clearing, financing, and execution capabilities. A year later, Cantor Fitzgerald began building its real estate business with the launch of CCRE. Cantor's affiliate BGC Partners expanded into commercial real estate services in 2011 by purchasing Newmark Knight Frank and the assets of Grubb & Ellis, to form Newmark Grubb Knight Frank.

Cantor Fitzgerald has an active special-purpose acquisition company underwriting practice, having led all banks in SPAC underwriting activity in both 2018 and 2019.

In March 2016, Sage Kelly, formerly of Jefferies Group, joined the firm as senior managing director and head of its investment-banking division.

Cantor Fitzgerald is one of 24 primary dealers authorized to trade US government securities with the Federal Reserve Bank of New York.

2025 was the company's year of record profitability. That same year, Howard Lutnick had been appointed as Commerce Secretary in the second Donald Trump administration and handed control of the company over to Brandon and Kyle Lutnick. According to Bloomberg News, the sons "bristle at suggestions that their new connections in Washington are contributing to that success." During his time in the White House as commerce secretary, Lutnick has pushed for projects and investments that benefitted his family. New York Times wrote in November 2025, "never in modern U.S. history has the office intersected so broadly and deeply with the financial interests of the commerce secretary’s own family, according to interviews with ethics lawyers and historians."

As of August 2026, the organization had spent $10 million in political contributions in the 2026 United States elections.

== Philanthropy ==
The Cantor Fitzgerald Relief Fund provided $10 million to families affected by Hurricane Sandy. Howard Lutnick and the Relief Fund "adopted" 19 elementary schools in impacted areas by distributing $1,000 prepaid debit cards to each family from the schools. A total of $10 million in funds was given to families affected by the storm.

Two days after the 2013 Moore tornado struck Moore, Oklahoma, killing 24 people and injuring hundreds, Lutnick pledged to donate $2 million to families affected by the tornado. The donation was given to families in the form of $1,000 debit cards.

Each year, on September 11, Cantor Fitzgerald and its affiliate, BGC Partners, donate 100% of their revenue to charitable causes on their annual Charity Day, which was initially established to raise money to assist the families of the Cantor employees who died in the World Trade Center attacks. Since its inception, Charity Day has raised $300 million for charities globally.

== Subsidiaries and affiliates ==
The firm has many subsidiaries and affiliates, including:

- BGC Partners, named after fixed-income trading innovator and founder B. Gerald Cantor, is a global brokerage company that services the wholesale financial markets and commercial real estate marketplace in New York, London, and other financial centers. BGC Partners includes Newmark Grubb Knight Frank, the fourth-largest real estate service provider in the US.
- Cantor Ventures is the company's corporate venture capital and enterprise development arm. Led by Henrique De Castro, the group's current investments include delivery.com, Ritani, TopLine Game Labs, AdFin, Lucera, NewsWhip, and XIX Entertainment.
- Hollywood Stock Exchange, founded in 1996, is the world's virtual entertainment stock market.
- TopLine Game Labs is a technology company to create short-duration fantasy sports and entertainment-based social gaming. Headquartered in Los Angeles, TopLine Game Labs was, in 2013, building a platform-agnostic architecture to power game experiences for sports.

== Senior management ==
=== List of chairpersons ===
1. Bernie Cantor (1945–1996)
2. Howard Lutnick (1996–2025)
3. Brandon Lutnick (2025–present)

=== List of CEOs ===
1. Bernie Cantor (1945–1991)
2. Howard Lutnick (1991–2025)
3. Pascal Bandelier, Sage Kelly, and Christian Wall (co-CEOs) (since February 2025)

=== List of presidents ===
1. Anshu Jain (2017–2022)

== See also ==
- Boutique investment bank
- List of investment banks
