= Foodler =

American food delivery company

Foodler Inc.
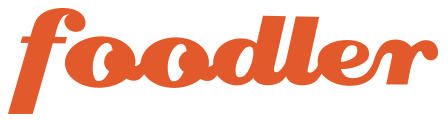
- Website type: Private
- Headquarters: Boston, Massachusetts, U.S.
- Area served: United States, Canada
- Founders: Christian Dumontet; John Jannotti; Phil Dumontet
- Key people: Christian Dumontet (CEO); Jim Ricotta (CIO); Kevin G. Johnson (Director/GM); Scott McDonnell (National Director)
- Industry: Online food ordering
- Website: foodler.com
- Written in: Java, Scala, Objective-C

Foodler Inc. was an American online food ordering service that connected consumers with a wide variety of restaurants for immediate delivery. The company’s website, www.foodler.com, ranked restaurants according to consumer feedback with recommendations based on order history, user ratings, discounts, and free delivery. Users could rank specific dishes. Foodler also remembered users’ favorite foods, addresses, payment, and tip preferences to speed up the ordering process.

== Overview ==
As of May 2017, the company had generated food sales of over $500 million. In June 2017, Foodler agreed to be acquired by once competitor GrubHub, after GrubHub itself was privately acquired and began to buy competitors before launching it's IPO and press release of the acquisitions and goal of becoming a house hold name for food delivery. On October 17, 2017, the Foodler website shut down and all orders migrated to GrubHub.

Delivery via Foodler was available from more than 12,000 restaurants in 48 states across the US. The company had more than 1,200 restaurants available on its platform within the Boston area. Jeff Zamiri, owner of Sorento’s Italian Restaurant located in the Greater Boston area, indicated that partnering with Foodler grew the business by “at least 10%"

Other locations included Atlanta, Baltimore, Chicago, Dallas, Denver, Miami, New York City, Orlando, Philadelphia, San Francisco, Washington DC, and in Vancouver, Canada.

== Features ==
In April 2013, the company began accepting Bitcoins as payment, making it the first food ordering service to accept the electronic currency. Users could use Bitcoins to purchase gift certificates for Foodler.

Foodler's rewards program allowed customers to earn points on each order which could be redeemed for FoodlerBucks, T-shirts, cash, or gift cards. The company also launched Foodler@work, allowing companies to pre-order food deliveries for small or large groups, as well as special events and parties.

The company released its iPhone app in April 2013. The app supported geolocation via GPS to assist customers in locating delivery options. Customer details were synced with the web site, including points, payment options, and delivery preferences.

The company released its iPad app in February 2014, followed by its Android app several days later.

== Partnership ==
Foodler announced its partnership with LevelUp on February 26, 2014, bringing LevelUp's payment and loyalty rewards programs to all customers and restaurants in its network. There were no paper menus and food was often delivered using scooters and bikes via Foodler delivery partners like DASHED.

== Recognition ==
- Christian Dumontet, CEO & co-founder, was named as a finalist in the 2014 Ernst & Young Entrepreneur of The Year Award.
- In 2014, Foodler was recognized as the #16 fastest-growing private company in Massachusetts by the Boston Business Journal. Later in 2014, Foodler was recognized by Inc. Magazine as one of America's fastest-growing private companies.

== See also ==
- EatStreet
