= Delivery.com =

American online platform and suite of mobile apps

delivery.com LLC
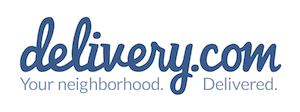
- Company type: Private
- Headquarters: New York City, New York
- Area served: United States
- Key people: Jed Kleckner (CEO)
- Industry: Online food ordering
- Services: Food delivery
- Employees: 264 (2019)
- Website: delivery.com

delivery.com LLC is an American online platform and suite of mobile apps that enables users to order from local restaurants and stores for on-demand delivery. The company currently has more than one million users and an online marketplace of more than 12,000 restaurants, wine and liquor stores, grocery stores, and laundry/dry cleaning providers.

Headquartered in New York, delivery.com offers service in over one hundred cities across the United States, including Chicago, Boston, San Francisco, Los Angeles, and Washington D.C. In 2014, delivery.com expanded into Hong Kong. The Hong Kong assets were then sold to Foodpanda in 2016, ending delivery.com's international business.

== Products and services ==
=== Online ordering ===
Users can place orders online at www.delivery.com or download the mobile app for iOS or Android. To place an order, the user must first enter their address to find out what merchants are available for delivery or pickup. From there, they can add items to their “bag”, including food, alcohol, groceries, or laundry services like wash-and-fold, dry cleaning, or tailoring. Secure payment methods available to delivery.com users include credit card, PayPal, Apple Pay, Visa Checkout, or cash. They also have the option to leave a tip at the time of checkout.

As a marketplace platform, delivery.com does not make or prepare food, nor does it handle laundry or deliver any of the items sold. When a user places an order, the order details are automatically sent to the intended merchant; the merchant confirms receipt from delivery.com then prepares and delivers the order.

=== API partners ===
delivery.com offers an open Developer API that enables developers to tap into its merchant. As a result of these efforts, delivery.com currently powers online ordering for a number of companies and third-party apps, including WeWork, LevelUp, BringMeThat.com, Menuless.com, Zipongo, Foodme.io, and others.

On February 11, 2016, delivery.com announced an integration with Foursquare, powering online ordering for the local discovery app.

=== Competitors ===
delivery.com's main competitors are Grubhub, Seamless, Eat24, ChowNow, Uber Eats, Postmates, and DoorDash.
