= Freezer Burn =

Freezer Burn may refer to:

- Freezer burn, damage to frozen food caused by dehydration and oxidation
- Freezer Burn (film), a 2007 independent film
- Freezer Burn (novel), a 1999 crime novel by Joe R. Lansdale
- Freezerburns, a frozen food review web show hosted by Gregory Ng
- The working title of the film Captain America: The Winter Soldier

== See also ==
- List of regional Burning Man events, listing several events called Freezer Burn
