= Phil Dumontet =

American entrepreneur

- Born: June 24, 1987 (age 39)
- Occupation: Entrepreneur
- Website: www.phildumontet.org

Phil Dumontet (born June 24, 1987) is an American entrepreneur. He is the chief executive officer of Brooksee, an endurance event production company based in Salt Lake City, Utah, and of Laurel Innovations, a race technology company. Dumontet is also the founder of Boulderthon, the Boulder Marathon, in Boulder, Colorado. He previously founded Dashed, a restaurant delivery service based in Boston, Massachusetts, which was acquired by Grubhub in August 2017 as part of the Foodler acquisition.

== Education ==
In 2009, Dumontet received his Bachelor's Degrees of Art in Marketing and Philosophy from Boston College.

== Career ==
Dumontet founded Dashed in 2009, starting the company on his bike with a Rubbermaid container and one restaurant. He expanded the company to deliver for more than 700 restaurants, as well as goods other than food, including beer, liquor, flowers, bakery items, and Christmas trees. Dumontet recruited and hired athletes for rapid delivery, offering medals and cash bonuses to improve their speed. Dashed was named to the Inc. 5000 list of the fastest-growing privately held companies in the United States for five consecutive years (2013–2017). The company expanded to nine cities and had approximately 2,000 drivers before its sale to Grubhub in 2017 for an undisclosed sum.

In 2017, Dumontet moved from New York to Boulder, Colorado. In July 2018, he co-founded Whole Sol Blend Bar, a Denver-based chain of organic, dairy-free, and gluten-free fast-casual restaurants, with his wife, Alexa Squillaro. Whole Sol Blend Bar was named to the Inc. 5000 list in 2022.

In January 2024, Dumontet was named chief executive officer of Brooksee, an endurance event production and timing company based in Salt Lake City, Utah, that produces the Las Vegas Marathon, Portland Marathon, Mesa Marathon, and REVEL Race Series. In this role, Dumontet leads the strategic development of Brooksee's event portfolio and oversees the go-to-market strategy and launch of Laurel, the company's AI-driven race timing technology. Dumontet remained an executive director of Boulderthon following the transition.

He serves on the Downtown Boulder Partnership Board, and is a contributor to The Washington Post, Business Insider, Entrepreneur, Fast Company, and Inc.

== Whole Sol ==
Whole Sol was founded in 2018 by husband and wife Duo Phil Dumontet and Alexa Squillaro. Whole Sol is a fast-casual, Denver-based restaurant group that serves organic, dairy-free, and gluten-free cuisine. In 2023, Whole Sol Blend Bar was named the #48th fastest-growing company in the U.S. by Financial Times.

In 2018, Dumontet co-founded Whole Sol Blend Bar, a Denver-based chain of smoothie-bowl restaurants, with his wife Alexa Squillaro. Whole Sol Blend Bar was named to the Inc. 5000 list in 2022.

== Boulderthon ==
Dumontet is a New York Road Runners marathon runner, finishing in the top 20 for his age group in New York City in 2015, and creator of Boulderthon. Nearly 3,000 runners registered to run the first Boulderthon, the signature Boulder Marathon, from 48 states and 4 countries. In its second year, Boulderthon drew runners from all 50 states and 15 countries, and nearly tripled in size.

The race moved its start and finish to Boulder's Pearl Street Mall beginning in 2023, and that same year Boulderthon spearheaded the nomination that led to the Road Runners Club of America designating Boulder as a Runner Friendly Community. The event drew over 15,000 runners from all 50 states and 18 countries by 2024.

Boulderthon's 5K has been named to USA Today's 10Best Readers' Choice list of best 5K races in the United States in three consecutive years (2024–2026).

== Brooksee ==
In January 2024, Dumontet was named CEO of Brooksee, an endurance event production and timing technology company founded in 2012 and based in Salt Lake City, Utah. At the time of his hiring, Brooksee's portfolio included the Portland Marathon, Mesa Marathon, and the REVEL Race Series.

In February 2025, Brooksee announced the launch of the Phoenix Marathon, built from the ground up as the signature marathon for the City of Phoenix, with the inaugural running held on December 13, 2025. Dumontet identified Phoenix — the fifth-largest city in the United States — as the largest U.S. city without a signature marathon at the time of the launch. The inaugural event sold out with over 7,200 registered runners from all 50 states and more than 12 countries.

In April 2026, Dumontet led the relaunch of the Las Vegas Marathon, announcing a completely redesigned course set to debut on January 10, 2027. The reimagined route starts and finishes at The STRAT, taking runners along the Las Vegas Strip, through the Fremont Street Experience, and past the Springs Preserve. The event retains its three signature distances — a marathon, a half marathon, and a 7.02-mile race named for the local Las Vegas area code.

In January 2026, Dumontet led and co-authored a bid with Joel Koester, executive director of the Phoenix Sports and Events Commission, for Phoenix to host the 2028 U.S. Olympic Marathon Trials. The bid is supported by the City of Phoenix and the office of Mayor Kate Gallego, and proposes a championship weekend that would move the Phoenix Marathon from its December date in 2028 to serve as a mass-participation race on the Saturday before the Trials.

== Laurel ==
As CEO of Brooksee, Dumontet led the development and launch of Laurel, the company's race timing platform. Laurel uses active, disposable timing chips to provide near-real-time participant tracking at high checkpoint density, along with AI-generated runner insights and safety features such as back-of-pack tracking and not-moving alerts. The technology was deployed at the 2024 Ragnar Wasatch Back, where it timed all 36 legs of the relay across more than 120 checkpoints, and at the 2025 Mesa Marathon, where 167 checkpoints were deployed across the course. In September 2025, Brooksee announced a partnership to deploy Laurel across Motiv Sports' U.S. event portfolio, including the Long Beach Marathon and Bay to Breakers.

== Awards ==
In 2016, Dumontet was named to Forbes 30 Under 30. In 2022, he was named to the Boulder Valley 40 Under Forty.
