= Smitten Kitchen =

Cooking blog

- Website type: Blog
- Available in: English
- Creator: Deb Perelman
- Editor: Deb Perelman
- Website: smittenkitchen.com
- Launched: 2006; 20 years ago

Smitten Kitchen is a blog for home cooks created and maintained by Deb Perelman. Perelman received undergraduate and graduate degrees from George Washington University, where she studied psychology and art therapy. She originally started writing online in 2003 while also working as an art therapist, and she eventually began the Smitten Kitchen blog in 2006.

According to Perelman, in November 2012, Google Analytics reported that her blog had 6 million unique views and almost 10 million page views. She has also been featured on numerous websites, NPR, and The Martha Stewart Show. In 2012, Smitten Kitchen won the Bloggie for best food weblog.

The Smitten Kitchen Cookbook was published in 2012 and debuted at No. 2 on The New York Times's best-seller list for hardcover advice and miscellaneous. Perelman's second cookbook, Smitten Kitchen Every Day: Triumphant and Unfussy New Favorites, was published in 2017. She published her third cookbook, Smitten Kitchen Keepers: New Classics for Your Forever Files, in 2022.

Perelman lives in New York City with her husband Alex, and their two children, Jacob and Anna.

== See also ==
- List of websites about food and drink
