= Eveve =

Restaurant reservation system company

Eveve Ltd.
- Industry: Software
- Founded: 1997
- Headquarters: Edinburgh, Scotland, UK
- Website: www.eveve.com

Eveve is a company which provides restaurant reservation systems. The firm is the largest independently owned supplier in the industry, managing two million online diners per year, and is the largest supplier in Minnesota, booking more table reservations than its main rival OpenTable. As of 2012, more than 40% of restaurant reservations in the Twin Cities was done by Eveve.

== History ==
Founded in 1997, the company launched its restaurant reservation system, for which it is best known, in 2007, initially with a selection of restaurants in Edinburgh. As of July 2014, the company has 870 restaurant clients in 11 countries, and is the largest supplier in New Zealand and Chile (under a subsidiary Reservarte); and the second largest supplier in the US, by online reservations.

In 2014, Eveve's operations in Texas expanded significantly. As of March of that year, Eveve had 20,000 diners per month in Houston.

The year 2015 saw accelerated expansion as Eveve gained market share in Seattle and Denver.

== Leadership ==
- Tim Ryan, CEO and President

== See also ==
- List of websites about food and drink
- OpenTable
