= Tapingo =

Mobile food delivery app

- Website type: Subsidiary
- Founded: 2012; 14 years ago
- Dissolved: 2019; 7 years ago
- Successor: Grubhub Campus Dining
- Headquarters: San Francisco, California
- Area served: United States and Canada
- Founders: Daniel Almog; Udi Oster
- Industry: Online food ordering
- Website: home.tapingo.com
- Native clients on: iOS and Android

Tapingo was an American mobile commerce application that offers advance ordering for pickup and food delivery services for college campuses. The company was acquired by Grubhub in September 2018 for approximately $150 million. Following the acquisition, Tapingo’s campus-ordering functionality was integrated into the Grubhub app (Grubhub Campus Dining) and the Tapingo service was discontinued during 2019.

Tapingo is differentiated from other on-demand delivery/logistics companies, such as Waiter.com, Postmates, or DoorDash, by focusing its efforts on serving the college market. Through Tapingo, users can browse menus, place orders, pay for the meal and schedule the pickup or have it delivered. On certain campuses, students are able to use their university's meal dollars to pay for food.

In the spring of 2012, Tapingo first launched its services on five campuses (Santa Clara University, Loyola Marymount University, Biola University, the University of Maine, and California Lutheran University), and has since expanded to more than 200 college campuses across the U.S. and Canada, serving 100 markets. To date, Tapingo has received venture funding from Carmel Ventures, Khosla Ventures, Kinzon Capital, DCM Ventures and Qualcomm Ventures.

In fall 2015, Tapingo announced expansion plans through major partnership deals with national brands like Chipotle Mexican Grill and 7-Eleven, regional restaurants such as Taco Bueno, and global foodservice provider Aramark.
