= SCVNGR =

Social location-based gaming platform

- Company type: Private
- Website type: Social Gaming
- Available in: English
- Headquarters: Cambridge, Massachusetts, United States
- Area served: Worldwide
- Founder: Seth Priebatsch
- Employees: 60
- Website: www.scvngr.com
- Registration: Required
- Current status: Offline

SCVNGR (SCaVeNGeR) was a social location-based gaming platform for mobile phones, like a location-based social network, SCVNGR was part game, part game platform.

== History ==
SCVNGR was founded by Seth Priebatsch.

In February 2011, it was speculated that SCVNGR had reached over 1 million users. In March 2011, SCVNGR launched LevelUp, a mobile payments platform to increase engagement and loyalty at local businesses.

As of 2021, scvngr.com redirects to thelevelup.com, a spinoff company and product that was acquired by GrubHub in 2018.

== Description ==
The application had both a consumer and enterprise component. Companies, educational institutions, and organizations could build challenges, the core unit of their game, at places on SCVNGR from the web. The service also supported SMS. SCVNGR built a game "layer" on top of the world.

Players could earn points by going places and doing challenges and could broadcast where they were and their activities to their friends on Facebook and Twitter. By doing challenges, players could unlock badges and real-world rewards, such as discounts or free items. By June 2010, over 1000 companies, educational institutions, and organizations had built on SCVNGR by creating challenges (and often rewards) at their locations.

== Uses ==
=== Education ===
At educational institutions, SCVNGR was mostly used as a tool for orientation for prospective and new students to college campuses (for example at the University of Louisville in Kentucky). Rather than having a traditional tour guide approach to orientation, colleges used the SCVNGR application to entice students to visit places they want students to know about, to receive rewards and as an icebreaker for meeting new people. The app was also used for orientation to campus libraries; for example, librarians from Boise State University and Oregon State University have created SCVNGR hunts and documented its use for library introductions for international students and bibliographic instruction.

=== Electronic literature ===
Louise McHenry and Marlene Ahrens, two students at IT University of Copenhagen, used SCVNGR to develop a location-based narrative where participants played a detective and investigated the theft of two fifth-century Viking artifacts, the Golden Horns. This narrative relied on visiting the actual locations for the story, where participants needed to complete challenges to obtain information about the theft and the characters.

=== Festivals ===
As part of the 2011 Humana Festival of New American Plays, 2amt's David Loehr used SCVNGR to "to let the audience engage, and to engage around the show instead of necessarily during the show."

== Funding ==
- In June 2008 the company raised a $35k Seed round with DreamIt Ventures.
- In August 2009 a $750k round was raised with Highland Capital Partners.
- In January 2010 a $4M Series B round was raised with Google Ventures, Highland Capital Partners and DreamIT Ventures.
- In January 2011 an additional $15M round was raised with Google Ventures, Balderton Capital, and Highland Capital
- In June 2012 a $12M Series D round was raised with Google Ventures, Transmedia Capital, Highland Capital Partners, and Balderton Capital – and in August of the same year an additional $9M Series D round was raised with T-Venture.

== See also ==
- Geosocial networking
- Gowalla
- Location-based game
- Social network game
- Gbanga
