= HungryGoWhere =

Food service review website

- Founded: 2006
- Dissolved: 11 July 2021
- Headquarters: Singapore, Singapore
- Area served: Singapore; Malaysia
- Founders: Dennis Goh; Wong Hoong An; Tan Yung Yih
- Industry: Business ratings and reviews
- Services: Web-based food guide
- Parent: GTW Holdings (2006–2012); Singtel (2012–2021); Grab (2022–present)
- Website: Singapore site; Malaysia site

HungryGoWhere is a food and restaurant review website based in Singapore.

== Background ==
The food portal has food and culinary guides and videos, along with user-generated reviews of restaurants and dishes. Users can search food based on criteria like price range, cuisine, and location, as well as make restaurant reservations. In March 2017, it added a Food Takeaway Service allowing online orders on its platform and self-collection from among 50 or so establishments. It has a sister site in Malaysia.

== History ==
The HungryGoWhere site founded by Dennis Goh, Wong Hoong An and Tan Yung Yih in 2004 and started in 2006, as a platform for users to gather information on F&B establishments and a portal where F&B establishments can grow their profile. HungryGoWhere was initially operated by GTW Holdings Private Limited (GTW). In May 2012, SingTel acquired 100 percent of GTW Holdings Private Limited (GTW), and announced and that its operations to merge with inSing.com, which is also a Singtel subsidiary. The acquisition is part of SingTel's growth strategy to expand its hyper-local service and drive SingTel’s efforts to capture opportunities in the digital world. The website was shut down on 11 July 2021.

On 15 June 2022, the technology company Grab announced the acquisition of the website and relaunched it, with the aim to address the "growing interest" of diners and to reconnect with the local food scene in a "much deeper ways".

== Locations ==
=== HungryGoWhere Singapore ===
HungryGoWhere Singapore was formerly integrated with inSing.com, which now registers a total of over two million users, making it one of the largest food and lifestyle site in Singapore. In 2017, the website drew an average of 1.15 million unique visitors per month. It also has a restaurant reservation system, which allows users to instantly reserve seats in restaurants without having to call in. In October 2013, the HungryGoWhere mobile app recorded 600,000 downloads with 100,000 monthly active users. Samsung phones sold by SingTel will find the app preinstalled in their phones.

=== HungryGoWhere Malaysia ===
HungryGoWhere launched in the Malaysia market officially on 24 August 2013. It made its entry by setting a Guinness World Record with the longest line of Nasi Lemak Bunkus, which is Malaysia's national dish. The event took place at the ice-skating rink of Sunway Pyramid shopping mall, where the Guinness World Record adjudicator, Carim Valerio, verified that there were 11,315 packets of nasi lemak, making it a world record. Nora Danish, popular actress and model in Malaysia was there to grace the event. The HungryGoWhere Malaysia site has a different user interface from HungryGoWhere Singapore. Besides being able to search for restaurants and food based on cuisine, eatery type, and price, users can search for food based on halal listings. SingTel partnered with Nara Logics, a Cambridge firm to provide better personalized search and curation of web data to improve the restaurants recommendations engine. This gives users a tailored list of dining recommendations from over 35,000 restaurants throughout the country. Interaction with the site is also gamified, where users are credited points and badges when taking certain actions within the site. For example, sharing photos of food can earn you a "Shutterbug" badge, and writing reviews of Thai food makes the user a "Thai food expert".

== See also ==
- List of websites about food and drink
