= LocalEats =

Venture-backed restaurant information/recommendation service

LocalEats is a venture-backed restaurant information and recommendation service that operates in the United States and in 50 international cities.

LocalEats has an iPhone application and a website similar to Google-owned Zagat, Yelp, and IAC/InterActiveCorp-owned Urbanspoon. In early 2011, LocalEats launched its iPad app, which added 50 international cities to its U.S.-based guide. Later in 2011, LocalEats partnered with restaurant deal aggregator BiteHunter to bring deal information into its website and app for deals at LocalEats featured restaurants.

The firm has also partnered with VC-backed SinglePlatform to offer in-app menus for more than 12,000 of its 14,000 selected restaurants.

== See also ==
- List of websites about food and drink
