= The F Word (British TV series) =

- Genre: Food magazine/Cooking show
- Starring: Gordon Ramsay; Giles Coren (series 1–2); Janet Street-Porter (series 2–5)
- Opening theme: "The F Word" by Babybird
- Country of origin: United Kingdom
- Original language: English
- No. of series: 5
- No. of episodes: 51

Production
- Running time: 44 minutes

Original release
- Network: Channel 4
- Release: 27 October 2005 – 7 January 2010

Related
- The F Word (American TV series)

The F Word (also called Gordon Ramsay's F Word) is a British cookery programme featuring chef Gordon Ramsay. The programme covers a wide range of topics, from recipes to food preparation and celebrity food fads. The programme was made by Optomen Television and aired weekly on Channel 4. The theme tune for the series is "The F-Word" from the Babybird album Bugged.

== Programme segments ==
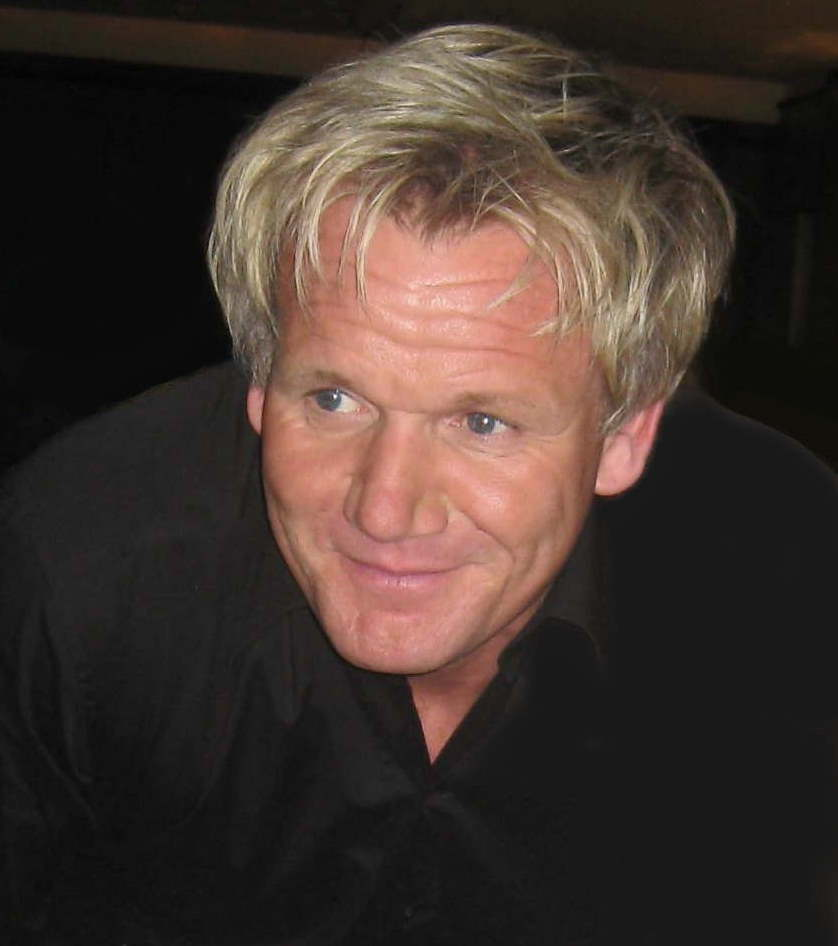
Gordon Ramsay in 2010

Each episode is based around Ramsay preparing a three-course meal at the F Word restaurant for 50 guests. Diners in the restaurant include celebrities, who participate in conversations, challenges, and cook-offs with Ramsay. Other segments focus on food-related topics such as alternative foods, visits by Ramsay to help people focus on healthy cooking and eating (some visits include taking on the occupations at the workplaces he visits), and even Ramsay himself demonstrating recipes of the courses to the home viewers. Finally, there was a series-long feature on home-reared livestock or poultry that was ultimately served to F Word diners on the series finale.

=== Series 1 ===
The first series is based around the "Get Women Back in the Kitchen" campaign where Ramsay visited several English households to help women who wanted to improve their culinary skills. The Times's restaurant critic Giles Coren and food writer Rachel Cooke acted as field correspondents who presented reports on food fads and healthy eating. Two or three commis (picked from a thousand applicants) competed in each episode to earn a position at one of Ramsay's restaurants. Ramsay raised turkeys in his garden, so that his children gained a better understanding of where their food came from. Chef and television presenter Hugh Fearnley-Whittingstall regularly offered tips on raising free range turkeys. The turkeys were named after other celebrity chefs, for example, Ainsley, Antony, Jamie, Delia, Gary and Nigella. The pudding (dessert) challenge regularly pitted Ramsay with a celebrity guest, with the winner having the honour of serving his or her pudding to the guests at the F-Word restaurant.

=== Series 2 ===
The series theme emphasises the importance of Sunday lunch, with Ramsay teaching families how to prepare this meal on a regular basis. From the second series onward, the restaurant had 50 paying diners served by an amateur brigade. If guests found any of their food unsatisfactory, they could choose not to pay for that item. Janet Street-Porter became the series' regular field correspondent; Giles Coren only appeared in a one-off segment on the Pimp That Snack website and phenomenon. The celebrity pudding challenge was changed to a general cooking challenge, while Ramsay raised pigs in his garden, which he named Trinny and Susannah. Hugh Fearnley-Whittingstall returned to offer advice on raising the pigs. Unlike Series 1, the second series of the show was usually transmitted after the 9pm watershed, meaning that Ramsay's infamous bad language was no longer bleeped out.

=== Series 3 ===
This series ran a campaign stating that "Fast food doesn't have to mean junk food", with Ramsay showing people how to prepare a simple supper in under 30 minutes, without having to order takeaways or rely on frozen meals or other convenience food. The best weekly amateur brigade was rewarded with the prestige of cooking at Ramsay's restaurant at Claridge's in the series finale. Ramsay home-reared a pair of Charollais-Welsh lambs, named Charlotte and Gavin. There was also a series-long search for a new "Fanny Cradock" which culminated in the selection of Ravinder Bhogal.

=== Series 4 ===
This series' weekly amateur brigade featured a celebrity and their relatives. Janet Street-Porter took on the responsibility of rearing veal calves nicknamed Elton and David in a North Yorkshire farm. Food columnist Tom Parker Bowles appeared on two episodes. In his first appearance, he visited Sardinia to sample casu marzu, a local cheese containing maggots. On his second stint, he attempted to cook a whole pig.

=== Series 5 ===
A fifth series premiered on 3 November 2009 on Channel 4. The series focused on a search for "Britain's best local restaurant". 10,000 nominations were narrowed down to 18 restaurant finalists representing nine different cuisines. The second round involved the finalists serving their signature dishes to a panel of diners at their own establishments, followed by a semi-final cook-off at Ramsay's flagship restaurant at Royal Hospital Road in Chelsea.

=== American version ===
On 30 September 2016, Fox announced that The F Word would go to the United States sometime in 2017. On 3 February 2017, it was announced that it would air for the summer. Each installment of the series will be presented live and will feature surprise guests and VIPs as well as foodie families from across the U.S. battling in cook-offs.

The series premiered on 31 May 2017 on Fox.

== Episode guide ==
=== Series 1 ===
No.	Celebrity guest	Guest cook-off	Original U.K. air date
1	Al Murray and Martine McCutcheon	Gordon loses	27 Oct 05
2	Joan Collins and Helen Cosgrove	Gordon wins	3 Nov 05
3	Christopher Parker	Gordon wins	10 Nov 05
4	Rachel Cooke	Commis chefs compete	17 Nov 05
5	Jonathan Ross and Gary Rhodes	Gordon loses	24 Nov 05
6	Richard Wilson, Nancy Dell'Olio, Kim Woodburn and Aggie MacKenzie	Gordon loses	1 Dec 05
7	Jimmy Carr, Sarah Beeny and Davina McCall	Gordon loses	8 Dec 05
8	Colin Jackson, Martine McCutcheon and Janet Street-Porter	Gordon loses	15 Dec 05
9	Sharon Osbourne and Hugh Fearnley-Whittingstall	Gordon loses	21 Dec 05

=== Series 2 ===
No.	Celebrity guest	Guest cook-off	Kitchen brigade	Brigade score (out of 150)	Original U.K. air date
1	Kathy Burke and Angela Griffin	Gordon loses	The Butchers	112	21 Jun 06
2	Cliff Richard and Janet Street-Porter	Gordon loses	The Essex Boys	117	28 Jun 06
3	Darren Gough and Jeremy Clarkson	Gordon wins	The PR Girls	46	5 Jul 06
4	Dermot O'Leary and Janet Street-Porter	Gordon loses	The Bolton Boys	94	12 Jul 06
5	John Humphreys and Dean Lennox	Gordon wins	The Doctors	128	19 Jul 06
6	Michelle Collins and Jonathan Ross	Gordon wins	The Students	83	26 Jul 06
7	Nick Knowles and Jessie Wallace	Gordon wins	The Adams Family	111	2 Aug 06
8	John Thomson	Gordon wins	The Farmer's Daughters	120	9 Aug 06
9	Janet Street-Porter, David Walliams and Hugh Fearnley-Whittingstall	Draw between Gordon and Janet	The Doctors (Note: The best performing brigade is invited to the series finale.)	149	16 Aug 06

=== Series 3 ===
No.	Celebrity guest	Guest cook-off	Kitchen brigade	Brigade score (out of 150)	Original U.K. air date
1	Dawn French and Natasha Kaplinsky	Gordon Wins	The Eton Boys	105	8 May 07
2	Ronnie Corbett and Girls Aloud	Gordon Loses	The Firemen	96	15 May 07
3	James May and Denise Van Outen	Gordon Loses	The Lancashire Lasses	126	22 May 07
4	Alex James and David Gest	Gordon Wins	The Eastenders	96	29 May 07
5	Chris Moyles and Meera Syal	Gordon Wins	The Estate Agents	62	5 Jun 07
6	Ian Botham and Dom Joly	Gordon Loses	The Desperate Housewives	109	12 Jun 07
7	Jonathan Ross and Sara Cox	Gordon Wins	The Police	111 (Note: Jonathan Ross assists in the dessert round.)	19 Jun 07
8	Gok Wan and Cat Deeley	Gordon Wins	The Army Boys	75	26 Jun 07
9	Ricky Gervais and Johnny Vegas	Gordon Wins	The Lancashire Lasses	144	3 Jul 07

=== Series 4 ===
No.	Celebrity guest	Guest cook-off	Kitchen brigade	Brigade score (out of 150)	Original U.K. air date
1	Wendi Peters, James Corden and Geri Halliwell	Gordon Wins	The Peters Family	129	13 May 08
2	Krishnan Guru-Murthy and Kate Garraway	Gordon Wins	The Guru-Murthy Family	101	20 May 08
3	McFly and Ben Miller	Gordon Loses	The McFly Brigade	115	27 May 08
4	Melanie Blatt, Liam Gallagher, Nicole Appleton and David Blunkett	Gordon Wins	The Appleton-Blatts	136	3 Jun 08
5	Paddy McGuinness, Dara Ó Briain and Jamelia	Gordon Wins	The McGuiness Brigade	121	10 Jun 08
6	Neneh Cherry, Andrea Oliver, John Prescott, Tom Parker Bowles and Dannii Minogue	Gordon Wins	The Cherry-Olivers	117	17 Jun 08
7	Angela Griffin and Meat Loaf	Gordon Wins	The Griffins	128	24 Jun 08
8	Matt Dawson, Joanne Salley, Edith Bowman, Dizzee Rascal and Tom Parker Bowles	Gordon Loses	The Dawsons	107	1 Jul 08
9	Mica Paris, Harry Enfield and Jo Brand	Gordon Wins	The Paris Family	124	8 Jul 08
10	Christopher Biggins, Jessica Hynes and Rob Brydon	Gordon Wins	The Biggins Family	89	15 Jul 08
11	Jon Snow, Erin O'Connor, Jade Jones and Emma Bunton	Gordon Wins	The Bunton Family	120	22 Jul 08
12	Melanie Blatt, Nicole Appleton and Graham Norton	Gordon Wins	The Appleton-Blatts	135	29 Jul 08

=== Series 5 ===
No.	Celebrity guest	Guest cook-off	Competing Restaurants	Original U.K. air date
1	Katie Price	Gordon Wins	Salvo's (Italy) (73/100) vs Prosecco (Italy) (71/100)	3 Nov 09
2	Lenny Henry	Gordon Wins	Lasan (India) (76/100) vs Curry Corner (India) (64/100)	10 Nov 09
3	none	none	French Table (France) (65/100) vs Bouchon Bistro (France) (72/100)	17 Nov 09
4	none	none	Chop Chop (China) (62/100) vs Sweet Mandarin (China) (82/100)	24 Nov 09
5	Rory Bremner	Gordon Wins	Simply Thai (Thailand) (82/100) vs Yum Yum (Thailand) (62/100)	1 Dec 09
6	Kelly Brook	Gordon Loses	El Gato Negro (Spain) (74/100) vs Lola Rojo (Spain) (61/100)	8 Dec 09
7	Ian Wright	Gordon Wins	Santa Maria del Sur (Argentina) 86/100) vs Discovery Bay (Jamaica) (75/100)	15 Dec 09
8	Dita Von Teese and Peter Andre	Gordon Wins	The Pheasant (United Kingdom) (80/100) vs The Swan (United Kingdom) (79/100)	22 Dec 09
9	Johnny Vaughan, Kate Silverton, and Fay Ripley	Gordon beats Kate but loses to Johnny and Fay	Retsina (Greece) (77/100) vs Doukan (Morocco) (63/100)	29 Dec 09
10	none	none	Lasan (India) vs Sweet Mandarin (China) vs Santa Maria del Sur (Argentina)	5 Jan 10
11	none	none	The Pheasant (United Kingdom) vs Simply Thai (Thailand) vs Retsina (Greece)	6 Jan 10
12	none	none	Lasan (India) (Win) vs The Pheasant (United Kingdom) (Loss)	7 Jan 10

== International broadcasters ==
The show has been broadcast around the world including the following countries:

Country	Broadcaster
Argentina	Film&Arts i-Sat
Australia	7TWO; Nine Network
Canada	BBC Canada; Food Network Canada; Casa
Czech Republic	Prima Love
Finland	Jim; MTV3
Greece	Skai TV
Hong Kong	Asia TV
Hungary	Paprika TV
Ireland	TV3
Italy	Rai 5
Netherlands	RTL 4
New Zealand	TV One
Norway	VOX
Philippines	Lifestyle Network
Poland	BBC Lifestyle
Portugal	Sic Radical
Quebec	Casa
South Africa	BBC Lifestyle
South Korea	Dong-a TV
Sweden	Kanal 5
United States	BBC America; FOX

In South Korea, the show was renamed Cook-King.

== Controversy and criticism ==
=== Women in the kitchen ===
A major component of series 1 was Ramsay's "Get Women Back in the Kitchen" campaign. In a self-administered survey, he found that three-quarters of women could not cook, with some 78% never cooking a regular evening dinner. Ramsay's findings were met with mixed reactions. While some of his contemporaries, like Nigella Lawson, previously stated similar opinions, other celebrity chefs, like Clarissa Dickson Wright, felt Ramsay's proposition was "rubbish and about ten years out of date". Wright felt that these comments undermined the increased enrollment of women at culinary schools across the United Kingdom. It was claimed that his desire was to help women who want to be able to cook but lack the confidence or motivation.

=== Animal slaughter ===
- The second-to-last episode of the first series featured the slaughter of six turkeys that were raised in Ramsay's garden. The scene had been preceded with a content warning. 27 viewers complained about the slaughter, leading to an investigation by Ofcom. Conversely, the media watchdog and Channel 4 also received 18 letters of support to counter the complaints. In 2004, Ramsay had also been criticised by the broadcast watchdog for swearing on-air.
- In the second series, viewers also saw the slaughter of his two pigs, which were raised throughout the series. They were taken to an abattoir and their brains stunned with an electric shock before being slaughtered. A few months earlier, another Channel 4 series, Jamie's Great Italian Escape (featuring Jamie Oliver) also received similar complaints after it featured the slaughter of a lamb.
- Similarly the lambs he kept were slaughtered at the end of series three. Warnings were given to viewers before the start of the programme explaining the graphic nature of the footage, there was no censoring of the death or evisceration of the animal.
- In series four, Ramsay received criticism for "sky fishing" for puffins, having their necks broken and eating the animals' raw flesh and heart of two birds, a local tradition in Iceland. Ofcom received 42 complaints, but no rules were deemed broken. Ofcom "also noted the birds were killed in a humane way with minimal suffering".

== DVD releases ==
=== North America ===
BFS Entertainment has released all five series of The F Word on DVD in Region 1.

DVD name	Episodes	Release date
The F Word – Series 1	9	17 February 2009
The F Word – Series 2	8	17 March 2009
The F Word – Series 3	9	6 October 2009
The F Word – Series 4	12	20 April 2010
The F Word – Series 5	12	25 October 2011

=== United Kingdom ===
IMC Vision has released all five series of The F Word on DVD in Region 2.

DVD name	Episodes	Release date
The F Word – Series 1 & 2	17	22 October 2007
The F Word – Series 3	9	10 March 2008
The F Word – Series 4	12	27 October 2008
The F Word – Series 5	12	19 June 2010
