= The F Word (American TV series) =

American competitive reality cooking show

- Genre: Cooking
- Created by: Gordon Ramsay
- Directed by: Phil Heyes; Alex Rudzinski
- Starring: Gordon Ramsay
- Opening theme: "The F Word" by Babybird
- Country of origin: United States
- Original language: English
- No. of seasons: 1
- No. of episodes: 11

Production
- Executive producers: Gordon Ramsay; David Friedman; Greg Lipstone; Layla Smith; Chris Brogden
- Production companies: Studio Ramsay; All3Media

Original release
- Network: Fox
- Release: May 31 – August 16, 2017

Related
- The F Word (British TV series)

The F Word is an American competitive cooking reality show hosted by celebrity chef Gordon Ramsay. The series premiered on May 31, 2017, on Fox. It is based on the original British series of the same name.

== Format ==
The F Word is a live hour-long cooking reality show in which families from across the U.S. compete as teams in a high-stakes cook off. Gordon Ramsay, celebrities, and various VIP guests judge the teams on their culinary skills.

In addition to the competition element, each episode will feature Ramsay talking with surprise guests in the dining room, as well as demos of the episode's featured dishes. He will also host live remote broadcasts and appear in special field segments with culinary experts and fans from around the country.

== Cast ==
- Gordon Ramsay - host
- Benjamin Kronick - sous chef (red team)
- Whitney Webster - sous chef (black team)
- Kayla Strong - maître d'hôtel
- Charity Kay Johnston - bartender

== Episodes ==
No.	Title	Original release date	US viewers (millions)
1	"Episode One"	May 31, 2017	3.33
Guest Stars: Jamie Foxx, Kevin Spacey and Snoop Dogg. Sexy Paisans beat Spice Boys in the competition.
2	"Episode Two"	June 7, 2017	2.37
Guest Stars: Kaitlin Olson, Rob McElhenney and James Corden. School Pride beats The Cooking Cubans in the competition.
3	"Episode Three"	June 14, 2017	2.35
Guest Stars: Kal Penn, Max Greenfield, Katy Perry and Lucas Lam. The Meatheads beat Wine & Stein in the competition.
4	"Episode Four"	June 21, 2017	2.05
Guest Stars: Andy Cohen, Joel McHale and Leslie Jones. The Food Bosses beat Slaw & Order in the competition.
5	"Episode Five"	June 28, 2017	2.05
Guest Stars: Jaimie Alexander, Rachel Bilson and Joe Manganiello. Miracle of the Kitchen beats Lords of the Lakes in the competition.
6	"Episode Six"	July 12, 2017	1.92
Guest Stars: Cat Deeley and Marlon Wayans. Italian Stallions beat Seoul Food in the competition.
7	"Episode Seven"	July 19, 2017	1.95
Guest Stars: Eric Stonestreet, Cheryl Hines, Chrishell Stause and Justin Hartley. The Military Wives Club beats Gourmet Gypsies in the competition.
8	"Episode Eight"	July 26, 2017	1.81
Guest Stars: Lea Michele and Adam Scott. License to Grill beats Chop it Like it's Hot in the competition.
9	"Episode Nine"	August 2, 2017	1.83
Guest Stars: Brad Garrett, Miranda Kerr, and Rob Riggle. Sass & Class beats Papa Knows Best in the competition.
10	"Episode Ten"	August 9, 2017	1.47
Guest Stars: Kate Beckinsale, Wayne Brady, and Ice Cube. The Extinguishers beat The Church Ladies in the competition.
11	"Episode Eleven"	August 16, 2017	1.66
Guest Stars: David Beckham, Laila Ali, Tony Hale, and Eva Longoria. The Military Wives Club beats The Sexy Paesans in the competition and won $100,000.

== Release ==
The F Word began airing on Fox during the 2016–17 television season.
