= African Food Network =

Food and drink website

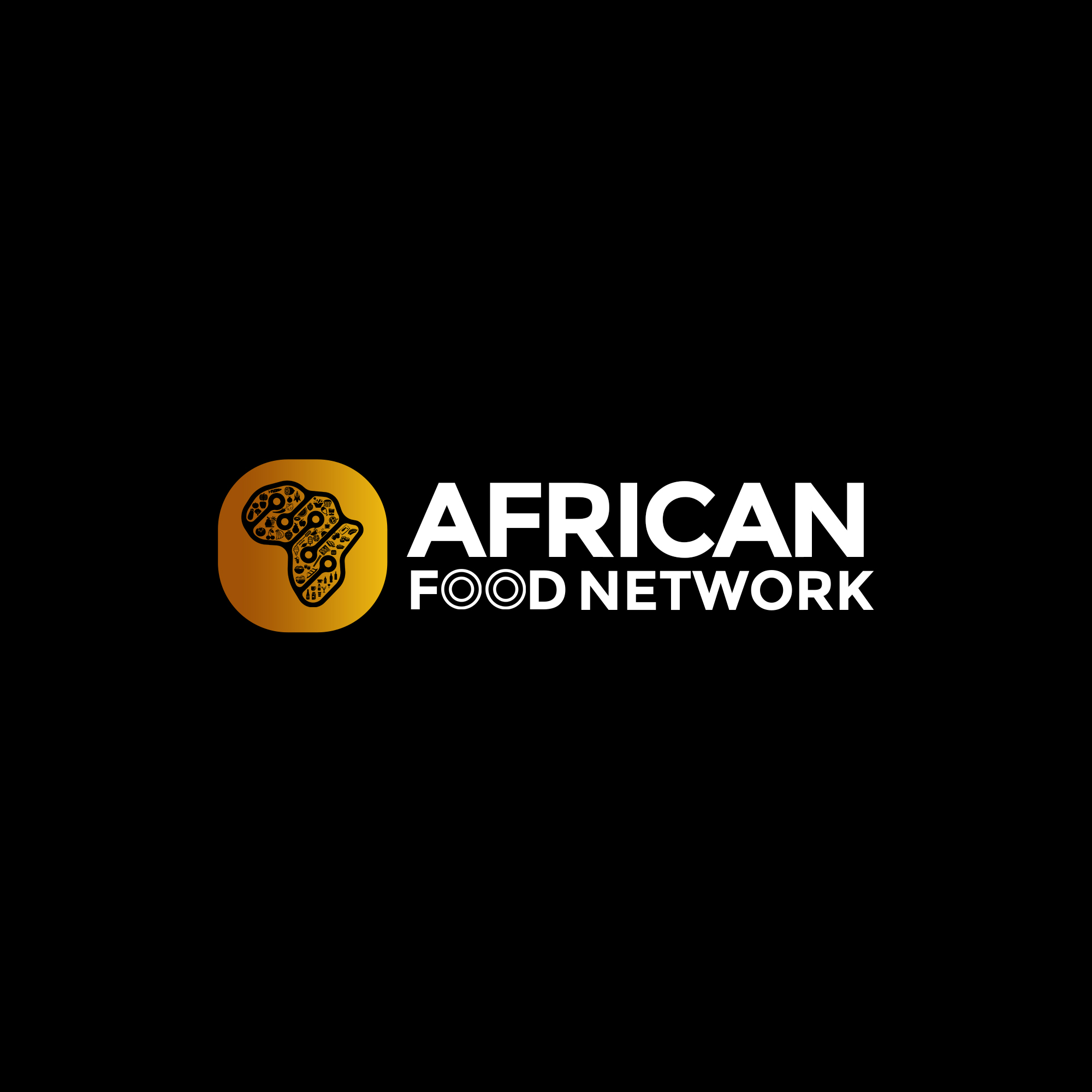
- Company type: Private
- Industry: Online food ordering
- Founded: 2017
- Founder: Kevin Eze
- Headquarters: Abuja, Nigeria
- Key people: Kevin Eze (CEO)
- Website: www.afrifoodnetwork.com

African Food Network, popularly known as Afri Food Network, is a website and company that is dedicated to African food and lifestyle. The site was launched in January 2017 by Kevin Eze in Abuja, Nigeria.

== History ==
African Food Network started off as just a mere website with less than 50 recipes in 2017 and now one of the biggest online African food recipe directory with over 500 recipes sourced from different authors. African Food Network was created to redefine the world’s view about African cuisine, Chefs and Traditional Cooks” cited by the founder.

== Events Hosted ==
Year	Title	City	Country	Ref
2021	African Food and Drinks Festival	Abuja	Nigeria	
2022	African Food and Drinks Festival	Accra	Ghana	
2022	African Food and Drinks Festival	Abuja	Nigeria	

== See also ==
- List of websites about food and drink
