= Boulderthon =

Series of footraces and organization

- Formation: 2019
- Headquarters: United States of America
- Race Director: Phil Dumontet
- Website: www.boulderthon.org

Boulderthon is an American marathon non-profit organization in Boulder, Colorado, founded by Phil Dumontet.

== Background ==
Boulderthon is a marathon and half marathon event held in Boulder, Colorado. Phil Dumontet acquired the original Boulder Backroads Marathon in December 2019 and redeveloped it into Boulderthon with a redesigned course and expanded race experience. Approximately 3,000 runners participated in the inaugural Boulderthon event, which ran from the Boulder Reservoir to downtown Pearl Street Mall.

The event nearly tripled in size in its second year, and added a kids fun run, a 5K, a 10K, as well as the signature full and half marathons. The race features an expo and fun finish line festivities, as well as runners from all 50 states, 15 countries, and an elite field.

In its third annual edition, Boulderthon became Colorado’s biggest fall race, with an estimated 7,000+ runners total.

By 2024, Boulderthon had grown to more than 15,000 participants across race weekend, drawing runners from all 50 U.S. states and 18 countries. The event had approximately doubled in size annually since its inception and became one of the fastest-growing marathon events in the United States.

When the Twin Cities Marathon was cancelled due to heat, Boulderthon organizers opened their arms and honored all race bibs the following weekend, resulting in hundreds of Twin Cities participants running.

Dumontet spent four years developing the event before its launch, in part to avoid adding a new race to the town’s existing race calendar; acquiring and relocating an existing competition downtown addressed that concern. Course development was a focus of the planning process. The mostly flat, point-to-point route starts at Boulder Reservoir and finishes on Pearl Street Mall.

Boulderthon races have received national recognition through USA Today's 10Best Readers' Choice Awards. The Boulderthon Heart to Heart 5K presented by Boulder Community Health was ranked among the top ten 5K races in the United States for three consecutive years. Boulderthon's Half Marathon was also ranked No. 8 nationally and has received recognition for its scenery and race experience.

In 2023, Boulderthon was named one of the Best Fall Marathons in the US by Runners World.

Boulderthon announced lululemon as its new multi-year title sponsor on April 22nd, 2026. The partnership includes exclusive lululemon finisher apparel for all finishers and the return of a pre- and post-race lululemon VIP Experience.
