= Ravinder Bhogal =

British chef, journalist

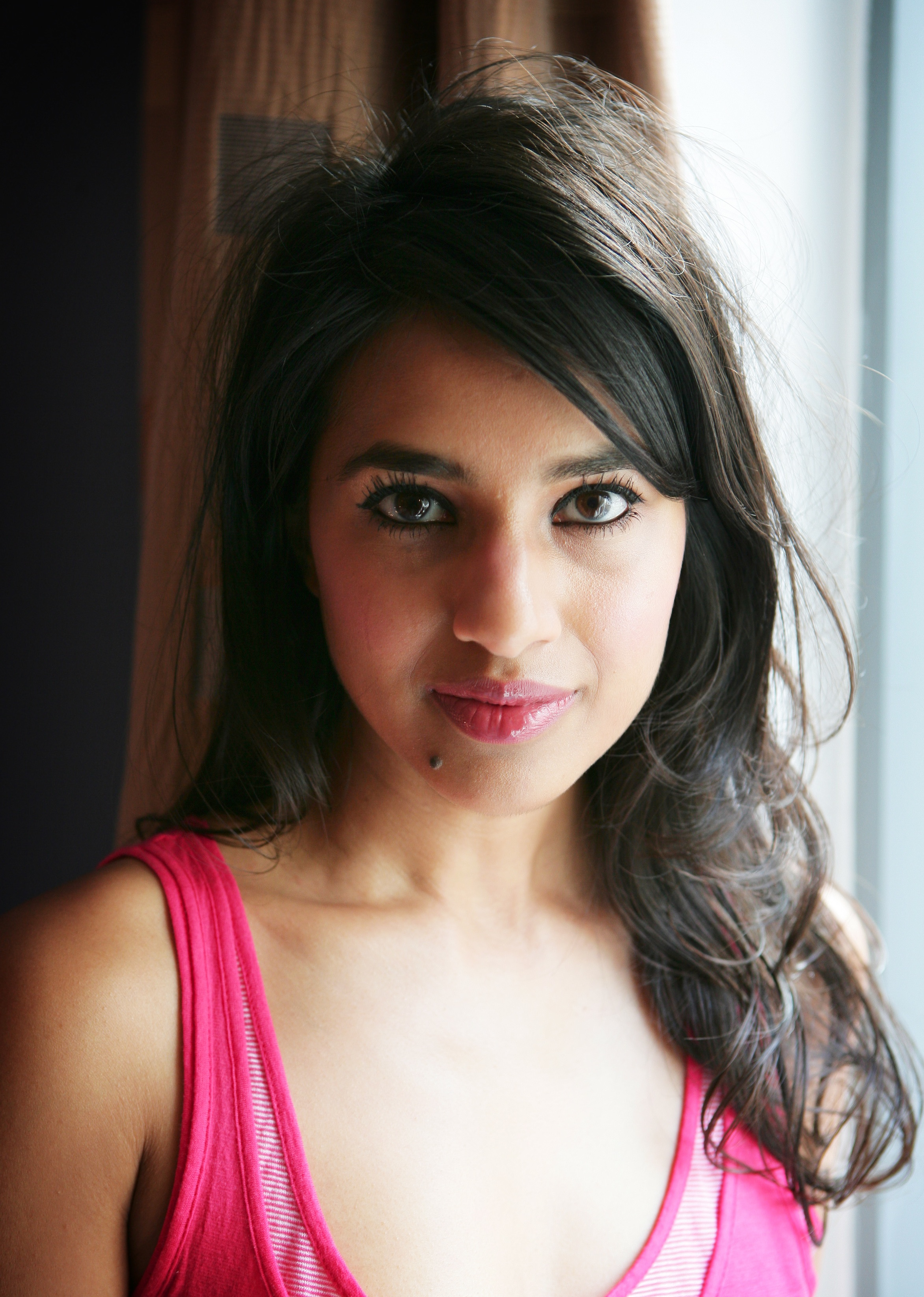
- Ravinder Bhogal
- Born: Nairobi, Kenya
- Culinary career
- Cooking style: British cuisine
- Current restaurant: https://jikonilondon.com/
- Television show: Host of Ravinder's Kitchen on TLC
- Award(s) won: Gourmand World Cookbook Award, Evening Standard Progress 1000 2017 & 2019, Asian Women of Achievement Award in Media 2013

Ravinder Bhogal is a food writer, restaurateur, British chef, journalist and stylist. She opened her first restaurant, Jikoni, in Marylebone, London in September 2016.

Bhogal's work and food spans flavours and culinary traditions from the Far East, South Asia, the Middle East, East Africa and Great Britain, and she celebrates the idea of immigrant cuisine.

Ravinder has written several cookbooks and writes a regular monthly column for the FT Weekend and Guardian Feast. Bhogal is contributing editor at Harper’s Bazaar and regularly writes for The Observer Magazine, The Guardian and Vogue online.

== Early life ==
Born in Nairobi, Kenya, Bhogal grew up in London.

== Career ==
=== Books ===
Bhogal has authored three books. Cook in Boots was released in 2009 by HarperCollins. The cookbook was awarded the first runners-up prize of the World's Best First Cookbook at the Paris Cookbook Fair in February 2010.

Jikoni: Proudly Inauthentic Recipes from an Immigrant Kitchen (Bloomsbury July 2020) won the 2021 IACP Cookbook Award and a Fortnum & Mason Award for Best Cookbook, and was shortlisted for the André Simon Award.

Comfort & Joy: Irresistible Pleasures from a Vegetarian Kitchen (Bloomsbury) was released on 25 May 2023. The Independent profiled Bhogal and Comfort & Joy. Columnist Avery Yale Kamila included Comfort & Joy on her list of the best plant-based books of 2023. Condé Nast Traveler writer Arati Menon profiled Bhogal and Comfort & Joy. Fordham University included the cookbook on its list of recommendations from its English faculty.

=== Television appearances ===
Bhogal made her first TV appearance when she won a competition in search of the new Fanny Cradock, judged by Gordon Ramsay and Angela Hartnett on series 3 of The F Word in 2007.

Ravinder travelled the world to investigate the journeys of different foods and farming practices in Channel 4's Food: What's in Your Basket with co-host Jay Rayner and has also hosted Ravinder's Kitchen, a culinary TV series that premiered in October 2013 on TLC.

== Awards and achievements ==
Bhogal has twice been included in the Evening Standard's Progress 1000 list as one of London's leading influencers of progress and diversity in the capital. Ravinder won the Asian Women of Achievement Award in Association with RBS in Media in 2013, a Gourmand World Cookbook Award for Best First Cookbook, and the 2021 IACP Cookbook Award for Chefs and Restaurants.

Her debut restaurant, Jikoni, was ranked in the top 100 UK Restaurants by the National Restaurant Awards and achieved a place in the Michelin Guide in the same year. Jikoni was more recently ranked No. 19 by Squaremeal in London’s Top 100 Restaurants 2022 and in Time Out’s Top 100 in 2023.

In 2021, Jikoni was the first independent restaurant in the UK to be certified carbon neutral.
