= ChefsFeed =

American media company

- Website type: Media and entertainment
- Available in: English
- Founded: 2011
- Headquarters: 32 Page St, San Francisco, CA 94102, U.S.
- Founders: Jared Rivera, Steve Rivera
- Website: chefsfeed.com
- Launched: 2011
- Current status: Active

ChefsFeed is a media company focused on food and drink reviews. ChefsFeed publishes original videos and stories to its website and apps, as well as dining guides. ChefsFeed also hosted a dining event series called ChefsFeed Indie Week.

== History ==
ChefsFeed initially launched in 2011 as an iOS app providing dining recommendations from chefs in New York, Los Angeles, Chicago and San Francisco who recommended their favorite dishes. In 2013, it launched a website and original video programming, and expanded nationally to cover 24 cities with 1000 contributing chef experts. In 2015, ChefsFeed changed its name from Chefs Feed, expanded to 50 cities and was redesigned. ChefsFeed also announced a Series A round for $4 million led by Artis Ventures in 2015.

== Programming ==
ChefsFeed's video programming includes mini-documentaries such as Opening Night and My 'Hood. Its video team spent six months embedded in the construction of San Francisco restaurant The Progress to create a short film. In 2016, chef Chris Cosentino discussed his mental health struggles in its video series Elevated, where chefs reveal challenges in their career.

ChefsFeed produces an animated web series called Worst Shift Ever featuring chefs sharing stories about their worst day at work. The program's second season aired in 2017 featuring chef Michael Voltaggio.

== Reception ==
In 2018, ChefsFeed was nominated for a James Beard Foundation Award for humor. Apple Inc. named it 2017 app of the year on Apple TV (Canada, US).

== See also ==
- List of websites about food and drink
