= DASHED =

Food delivery service

Dashed, Inc.
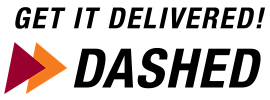
- Type: Private
- Industry: Online food ordering
- Founded: Boston, United States (2009)
- Founder: Phil Dumontet
- Defunct: October 17, 2017
- Fate: Acquired by Grubhub
- Services: Restaurant delivery
- Revenue: $7.5m
- Number of employees: 122
- Parent: Grubhub
- Website: dashed.com

Dashed, Inc. (stylized as DASHED) was a US restaurant delivery service founded in Boston, Massachusetts by Phil Dumontet in 2009. The company provided rapid delivery for over 800 restaurants that don't have their own services in Baltimore, Boston, Hoboken, New Haven, Philadelphia, Providence and Washington, DC.

Dashed was acquired by Grubhub in August 2017 and on October 17, 2017, the Foodler website that Dashed operated through was shut down and all ordering migrated to GrubHub.

== Background ==
The company was founded under the mission of providing the industry's fastest delivery. Entrepreneur Magazine wrote it has "largely achieved that goal", citing technology, speed-based incentive systems, and diversified delivery methods. The same magazine named it as one of the Best Entrepreneurial Companies in 2015 in its augural Entrepreneur 360 list.

In 2013, DASHED rolled out a fleet of electric Smart cars for its delivery drivers. According to the Boston Globe, as of November, DASHED has a total of 12 company SmartCars, which are available for rent to an approved pool of drivers for $15 per 8-hour shift. The microcar rental fleet was only available in Boston.

== Partnerships and expansion ==
The company partners exclusively with Foodler for online ordering. It expanded to Baltimore in April 2013, adding 50 restaurants that don't have their own delivery staff, including P.F. Chang's. Restaurants pay DASHED a 30 percent commission to make their deliveries. Dashed was acquired by Grubhub in August 2017.

== Locations and services ==
Operating in nine cities, DASHED used a mix of bikes, scooters and automobiles to deliver food from 9:30 a.m. to 12:45 a.m. seven days a week. About 25% of their orders were delivered by bike & scooter. According to BostInno, DASHED brought its participating restaurants an average of $2,000 in new delivery sales per week, and some restaurants have dropped their own delivery service to hire DASHED. The company introduced a 45-minute Christmas tree delivery service in Boston, which included trees, tree stands, garland, wreaths, and poinsettias. The program was popular with corporate clients, with daily deliveries to the Prudential Center.

== Awards ==
In 2014, DASHED was named the leading restaurant delivery service in the Northeast by Inc. Magazine. In 2015, it was ranked one of the fastest-growing companies in the U.S. for the second year in a row by the same publication, one of Entrepreneur Magazine's Top 30 Startups to Watch and Best Entrepreneurial Companies, and the Best in Biz Silver winner for Fastest Growing Company in the country.

In January 2016, Founder & CEO Phil Dumontet was named to the Forbes 30 Under 30.
