= Taco Bueno =

U.S.-based fast-food restaurant chain

Taco Management LLC
- Trade name: Taco Bueno
- Type: Subsidiary
- Industry: Restaurant
- Genre: Quick service
- Founded: 1967; 59 years ago in Abilene, Texas
- Founder: Bill Waugh
- Headquarters: Farmers Branch, Texas
- Number of locations: 133 (2023)
- Area served: Southern United States
- Key people: Omar Janjuea (CEO); Robert Sanders, VP of Taco Bueno, Sun Holdings
- Products: Tacos, burritos, and other Mexican-related fast food
- Revenue: ▲$187 million
- Owner: Sun Holdings
- Number of employees: 3,856 (2021)
- Website: tacobueno.com

Taco Management LLC, doing business as Taco Bueno, is a U.S.-based, quick-service restaurant chain specializing in Tex-Mex-style cuisine. The company is headquartered in Farmers Branch, Texas, in the Dallas–Fort Worth metropolitan area. Its first location opened in Abilene, Texas, in 1967. The food chain has locations in Arkansas, Oklahoma, and Texas.

== History ==
Taco Bueno was founded in 1967 in Abilene, Texas, by Bill R. Waugh, an art graduate from Abilene Christian University.

In 1981, British food manufacturer Unigate acquired Taco Bueno for $32.5 million. Taco Bueno was then sold to CKE Restaurants, the franchisor of Carl's Jr., in 1996. To help CKE Restaurants reduce its debt, the private investment group Jacobson Partners purchased the chain for $72.5 million in 2001.

On August 10, 2005, Palladium Equity Partners announced its purchase of Taco Bueno from Jacobson Partners, appointing John Miller as CEO. In 2011, Ed Lambert became CEO of Taco Bueno, LP., followed by Mike Roper in 2015.

In fall 2015, Taco Bueno announced its first delivery expansion collaboration with mobile app Tapingo. In early December 2015, Taco Bueno was purchased by TPG Growth, a division of the Fort Worth private-equity firm TPG Capital.

On April 28, 2017, season eight, episode seven of the CBS show Undercover Boss debuted, with the CEO of Taco Bueno working at several Taco Bueno locations.

Following Mike Roper's departure in late 2017, Omar Janjua was appointed CEO in April 2018. On November 6, 2018, Janjua filed for Chapter 11 bankruptcy restructuring. As part of the reorganization, the chain agreed to an acquisition by Dallas-based Sun Holdings, which owned or controlled more than 800 fast-food franchise locations. An affiliate of Sun Holdings, Taco Supremo, assumed Taco Bueno's outstanding debt and supplied $10 million in working capital to reorganize and revitalize the business. On January 15, 2019, Taco Bueno emerged from Chapter 11 bankruptcy.

In mid-June 2020, amid the COVID-19 pandemic, the chain opened its first Houston-area location in Katy.

== References in popular culture ==
- Taco Bueno has been referenced several times on the television show King of the Hill. In the episode, "Kidney Boy and Hamster Girl: A Love Story", Bobby discovers a Taco Bueno in the cafeteria of the high school where he is pretending to be a student.

== See also ==
- List of Texas companies (T)
