= Ritani =

Jewelry company

- Company type: Private
- Industry: Jewelry
- Founded: 1999
- Headquarters: New York, United States
- Key people: Diane Irvine (Board member, 2014–)
- Products: Jewelry, Diamonds, Engagement rings
- Website: Ritani.com

Ritani is a jewelry company based in New York.

== History ==
In 2012, Chief investor Cantor Fitzgerald invested $15 million in Ritani, following the Julius Klein Group selling their stake in the company. In January 2014, Ritani was selected for the Forbes list of America's Most Promising Companies for its unique "clicks and bricks" model that blends online shopping and brick-and-mortar stores.

In June 2014, Ritani announced that the former Blue Nile CEO Diane Irvine had joined the company's board of directors. Ritani's independent jewelry store partners network has over 180 locations across the United States and Canada. Ritani also offers a free in-store preview and has an inventory of over 60,000 diamonds ranging in price from $184 to $1.7 million.
