= Pimp That Snack =

Website features guides on creating giant versions of everyday snacks

Current Pimp That Snack Logo

Pimp That Snack is a website which received media attention during April 2006. The website features guides on creating giant versions of everyday snacks. Articles are submitted by members of the public and a voting system allows people to rate each pimp from 1 to 100.

Initially known as 'Pimp My Snack', the site changed name during May 2006 following contact from Viacom legal representatives, who claimed that the name of the website was an infringement on trademarks relating to their Pimp My Ride television program.

The website creator Pete Wilcock, from Cheadle Hulme, Stockport, Greater Manchester, has been interviewed on national radio, newspapers, and popular magazines such as Zoo, Nuts, and Loaded.

On 2 August 2006, the Channel 4 food programme The F-Word did a segment on the website. Food critic Giles Coren "pimped" a giant Jaffa cake. With an audience of 6 million people in the UK, this was a substantial plug for the website and the resulting traffic caused some difficulty keeping the site online.

More recently the website has been featured on Annie Mac's BBC Radio 1 programme, as well as BBC Two's Ready Steady Cook programme on 3 November 2006 and on Channel 4's Homemade programme on 17 February 2007.

The site was featured on BBC Radio 5 Live on 7 February 2010.

== See also ==
- List of websites about food and drink

== Sources ==
- Moon, Amy (5 May 2006). "Pimp My Snack". SFGate. Archived from the original on 8 March 2016.
- "Pimp my snack". New Statesman. 1 May 2006. Archived from the original on 16 April 2007.
- "Pimp my biscuit". Metro. 26 April 2006. Archived from the original on 29 September 2007.
- "PimpMySnack: homemade, gigantic versions of snack food". BoingBoing. 21 April 2006. Archived from the original on 24 April 2006.
- "Extreme food on PimpMySnack.com". News.com. 18 April 2006. Archived from the original on 9 August 2011.
