= Food.com =

Digital brand and online social networking service

- Former name: Genius Kitchen
- Website type: Recipe
- Headquarters: New York, New York, United States, United States
- Owners: Television Food Network, G.P. (Skydance)
- Website: food.com
- Commercial: Yes
- Launched: 1999

Food.com is a digital brand and online social networking service featuring recipes from home cooks and celebrity chefs, food news, new and classic shows, and pop culture. Food.com was launched in September 2017 and offers recipe, photo, articles, and video content on the web as well as video streaming and smartphone apps.

The website features more than 500,000 user-generated recipe pages, to which users can add reviews, modifications, questions and photos. It is one of the 3 food-related properties owned by Skydance, alongside Food Network and Cooking Channel.

== History ==
Food.com changed their name to Genius Kitchen in 2017, but as of July 2019 it switched back to Food.com once again. The site formerly known as Recipezaar, and originally as Cookpoint, was created in 1999 outside of Seattle, Washington by two ex-Microsoft technologists Gay Gilmore and Troy Hakala. What started as an idea to connect home cooks from all over the world has grown into a daily cooking community, featuring 500,000+ user-generated recipes, 125,000+ photos, millions of reviews and tweaks.

== Operation ==
Food.com is headquartered in New York and is part of the Discovery Inc. portfolio, which also owns and operates brands such as Discovery Channel, Animal Planet, American Heroes Channel, Food Network, Cooking Channel, HGTV, Travel Channel, and Magnolia Network.

== See also ==
- The Food Channel
- List of websites about food and drink
