= PlateCulture =

PlateCulture is a sharing economy platform that enables guests to dine at a local host's home. The site was founded by Lithuanian entrepreneurs Reda Stare and Edvinas Bartkus. It launched in 2013 with a focus on tourists and locals in Southeast Asia.

It currently offers two mobile apps for Android and iPhone users as well as web-based platform.

PlateCulture allows hosts to list their kitchens through the site and guests to make bookings to dine at a host's home restaurant. Both parties leave a review about their experience. In November 2015, the BBC noted the platform's positive impact on language learning opportunities between locals and travellers.

In September 2015, VICE journalist Lauren Razavi described PlateCulture as "an Asian startup that's essentially the Airbnb of food" in a feature story profiling a Persian chef who runs a home restaurant in Kuala Lumpur through the platform.

== See also ==
- List of websites about food and drink
