= Lists of tenants in the World Trade Center (1973–2001) =

These are lists of the major tenants of the former World Trade Center in New York City at the time of the attacks in 2001.

- 1 World Trade Center (North Tower) included the Port Authority of New York and New Jersey, Marsh & McLennan Companies, Bank of America, Cantor Fitzgerald, Dai-Ichi Kangyo Group, Sidley Austin Brown & Wood, Empire Blue Cross and Blue Shield, and restaurant Windows on the World.
- 2 World Trade Center (South Tower) included Verizon, the New York Stock Exchange, Morgan Stanley, Xerox Corporation, Keefe, Bruyette & Woods, Aon Corporation, Fiduciary Trust Company International, and tourism Top of the World Trade Center Observatories.
- 3 World Trade Center (Marriott World Trade Center) was a hotel, therefore the whole building had one owner, Host Marriott Corporation.
- 4 World Trade Center included New York Board of Trade, Deutsche Bank, and the Mall at the World Trade Center.
- 5 World Trade Center included Credit Suisse First Boston and Morgan Stanley.
- 6 World Trade Center, the U.S. Customhouse, included the United States Customs Service, United States Department of Commerce, Bureau of Alcohol, Tobacco, Firearms and Explosives, and the United States Department of Labor.
- 7 World Trade Center included Salomon Smith Barney, the U.S. Securities and Exchange Commission, Standard Chartered Bank, and the U.S. Secret Service.
