= OrderUp =

American food delivery company

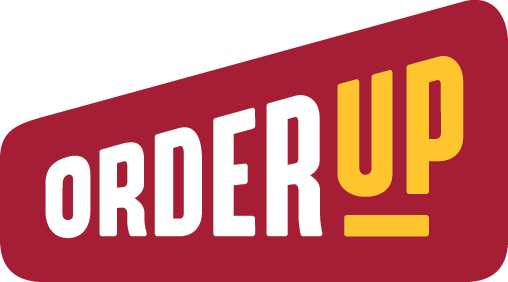
- Formerly: LocalUp
- Type: Private
- Industry: Online food ordering and delivery
- Founded: 2009; 17 years ago
- Founder: Chris Jeffery, Jason Kwicien
- Defunct: 2018; 8 years ago
- Fate: markets acquired by Grubhub
- Headquarters: Baltimore, Maryland, United States
- Number of locations: 37 markets
- Area served: United States
- Number of employees: 100+
- Website: orderup.com

OrderUp was an American online food ordering and delivery company that operated in 37 US markets. Groupon acquired OrderUp in July 2015 and separately launched the Groupon To Go service using OrderUp’s technology. In July 2017, Grubhub announced it would acquire assets in 27 OrderUp markets; it completed the purchase of the remaining 11 franchisee-owned markets on October 30, 2018.

== History ==
OrderUp started as an online food ordering business, called LionMenus, which served State College, PA. In 2009, the founders relocated to Baltimore, MD and formed LocalUp to expand to additional markets. The company used $1.5 million in investments to facilitate growth into small markets. OrderUp is one of a growing number of companies geared towards capitalizing on online food ordering. Other companies, including Grubhub, provide similar services to restaurants and consumers.

Initially, LocalUp licensed their technology to entrepreneurs who created online food ordering sites in their own communities These licensees white-labeled the technology and ran the everyday operations. LocalUp operated under this licensing model until 2012, when the company rebranded as OrderUp and switched to a franchising model. Now, OrderUp has switched most local sites to the national brand. OrderUp is one of the first companies to provide a digital franchise in order to target local markets.

As of August 2013, OrderUp had sites in about 25 American cities and had launched a mobile application from which users can order food using Android or iOS devices.

In August 2014, the company announced a $7 million Series A investment round focused on growing its technical team and expanding its delivery service nationally.

In July 2015, Groupon acquired the company. In 2016, OrderUp was in 62 cities.

In July 2017, Grubhub acquired 27 company-owned OrderUp food delivery markets from Groupon and announced plans to retire the OrderUp brand. Sixty full-time employees were laid off from OrderUp's headquarters in Baltimore.

In October 2018, Grubhub acquired certain assets of 11 remaining franchisee-owned OrderUp food delivery markets across California, Colorado, Indiana, Missouri, Oregon, Oklahoma, and Virginia.
