= Foodhub =

Food delivery service

- Formerly: touch2success
- Industry: Online food ordering
- Founded: 2008
- Founders: Ardian Mula; Mohammed Shakil
- Headquarters: Dublin, Ireland
- Area served: United Kingdom; Ireland; Australia; New Zealand; United States
- Products: Online Ordering POS Systems(EPoS system); KDS; Delivery Management Third Party Order Management
- Number of employees: 1000+
- Website: foodhub.co.uk (GBR); foodhub.com.au (AUS); food-hub.ie (IRE); foodhub.com (US); food-hub.nz (NZ)

Foodhub (formerly known as Touch2Success) is an online food ordering company in the UK, US, Australia and New Zealand. It is headquartered in Stoke-on-Trent, England. It was founded in 2008 by Ardian Mula and Mohammed Shakil.

== History ==
The company was founded in 2008 as touch2success. The company initially focused on creating websites and epos for individual businesses.

In 2020 Foodhub announced its expansion into the Republic of Ireland. It serves restaurants and takeaways / takeout clients in the UK, Australia, New Zealand, Republic of Ireland and the USA.

== Acquisitions ==
=== Big Foodie ===
In a multi-million-pound deal, Foodhub's parent company, software company Touch2Success, acquired Manchester-based online takeaway platform Big Foodie.

=== Eat Appy ===
Foodhub expanded its international footprint by acquiring Eat Appy, an Australian food delivery app.

== Partnerships and Sponsorships ==
=== Port Vale FC ===
Foodhub extended its reach into the sports arena with a sponsorship deal with Port Vale Football Club. The company was the match and match ball sponsor for a Sky Bet League One fixture against Derby County.

=== Stoke City FC ===
Foodhub entered into a two-year sponsorship deal with Stoke City FC in 2022 which involved them receiving two minutes of advertising per game on the pitch side hoardings, and additional advertising appearing around the Stadium and the club’s digital platforms. Since then, Foodhub have remained closely linked with the club, continuing their sponsorship of the matchday Half Time Challenge.
