= Meishichina =

美食天下 MeishiChina
- Website type: Recipe
- Available in: Mandarin
- Owner: Yu Hang
- Website: http://meishichina.com/
- Commercial: Yes
- Users: 30 million monthly unique visitors
- Launched: November 2004

Meishichina (Chinese: 《美食天下》; pinyin: měishí tiānxià) is a Chinese social networking service about food which is headquartered in Beijing, China. It began primarily as a curated recipe site, but evolved into a social service with integration to qq, weibo and other services, where people actively share and work on recipes, including meeting up in person through Meishichina activities.

== Overview ==
There are over 3.53 million pages of recipes and articles indexed by Google. Originally drawing most of its revenue from advertising, today more than half is derived from online contests. Meishichina provides users with original stage show cooking, gourmet-focused community exchange, and a micro-blog based "life-sharing" platform. “The website is no longer just a platform for merely learning how to cook, but one where users can communicate about the fine points of gourmet culture,” founder Yu Hang said. Meishichina is recognized as having helped catapult several of its top bloggers into stardom.
