= Freezerburns =

Frozen food review web show

- Logo
- Genre: Reviewing
- Created by: Gregory Ng
- Presented by: Gregory Ng
- Country of origin: United States
- Original language: English
- No. of episodes: 692

Original release
- Network: YouTube, Next New Networks
- Release: 2008–2014

Freezerburns was a frozen food review web show hosted by Gregory Ng. Calling himself the "Frozen Food Master", Ng ate and reviewed various brands of frozen food and assigned them a rating based on his opinion. The show started on his website, freezerburns.com, but expanded onto YouTube and joined Next New Networks' Hungry Nation channel, and could be seen on around twenty other websites. With 55,000 site visitors per month and 5,000 views per show, Freezerburns attracted the attention of large food companies like Kraft and ConAgra, who sent Ng packages of frozen food to review. Freezerburns was also featured on a variety of news and blogs.

== Format ==
Gregory Ng, the self-proclaimed "Frozen Food Master," served as the host for each episode of Freezerburns. Each episode began with the Freezerburns theme song written and sung by independent artist Skyrmish. Along with written reviews available on the Freezerburns website, Greg hosted different types of reviews, among them full length reviews, one word reviews, "Fro-Down" reviews, which featured a comparison between two similar items, and Live reviews. Ng's style was relaxed, speaking casually to the audience. He displayed the frozen dish, and, after cooking, commented on its taste, sometimes upon the first bite. Each episode ended with a "question of the day," which helped Ng interact with his followers.

== Cast and crew ==
Ng has described Freezerburns as "a one-man show" and stated that no one assisted him in making the videos. He spent 25 hours a week filming, editing, and responding to emails about Freezerburns. On special occasions, such as Live reviews, Greg was joined by co-hosts.

== Reception ==
Reaction to Freezerburns was mostly positive, praising the content as well as the idea. Liz Shannon Miller of GigaOM has said Ng produced "exceptionally thorough reviews" that "also manage[d] to be quite entertaining." David Garland of Open Forum praised Ng's concept and marketing strategy, stating the webshow was "a fantastic example of creative marketing and putting ideas into action."

== Cancellation ==
On August 31, 2014, Ng published his review of Kid Cuisine's How to Train Your Dragon Chicken Nuggets. In the middle of the video, Ng appears to be fed up with the quality of the meal and abruptly walks off camera, declaring he was quitting the show.

Many critics and fans have accused Ng of staging this ending. In an interview with Adweek, Ng explained ending the show was in the works, but the timing was spontaneous, "I reviewed this particular Kid Cuisine meal and I just got very angry during the review. It is geared at kids, and it just isn't anything I would serve to them. It was also a meal that has a commercial tie-in with the How to Train Your Dragon 2 movie, and the commercialization of the meal made me upset. I record every episode in one take, and it just happened. So it wasn't staged, but there was certainly a buildup to this moment."

Additional coverage pointed to the unhealthiness of frozen food and applauded Ng for taking a stand against processed foods. In an interview with Inside Edition, Ng revealed he had been in contact with representatives from ConAgra, the manufacturer of the Kid Cuisine frozen food line.

In an interview with CBS This Morning, Ng revealed that even though across all video channels, he was receiving upwards of 200,000 views per episode, the popularity of his final episode caught him by surprise.

== See also ==
- List of websites about food and drink
