= Wine Folly =

Wine-themed website

- Company type: Private
- Industry: Internet
- Founded: October 25, 2011, in Seattle, Washington
- Headquarters: Seattle, Washington
- Number of employees: 2
- Website: winefolly.com

Wine Folly is a website founded in October 2011 by Madeline Puckette and developer Justin Hammack. The website was found and is headquartered in Seattle, Washington. The website is an educational wine blog that publishes articles, videos, courses, and infographics to help simplify wine and educate readers.

The website was also made into two books. The first one is called Wine Folly Paperback, published on September 22, 2015, as an illustrated version which has been called 'The best introductory book on wine to come along in years' by The Washington Post. The second one, Wine Folly: Magnum Edition, was a hardback version published on September 25, 2018, as the expanded wine guide from the creators of Wine Folly, packed with new information for devotees and newbies alike. This book was also awarded the James Beard award.

== History ==
Madeline Puckette studied graphic design at California Institute of the Arts. At age 27, she began working at a wine tasting room in Reno, Nevada, and took the Court of Master Sommeliers' certification exam.

Using content from the blog, Puckette and Hammack wrote a reference guide, Wine Folly: The Essential Guide to Wine, published by Avery in 2015. In November 2015, the book was included in The New York Times Best Seller list for food and diet books.

In 2017, Puckette embarked on a book tour for Wine Folly: The Essential Guide to Wine making stops at several wineries in Washington. The Washington Post characterized the book as "the best introductory book on wine to come along in years".

In 2018, the release of, Wine Folly: Magnum Edition, The Master Guide was prepared and issued for sale to the public. Wine writer Keith Wallace recommended that readers include the blog in their list of "Eleven Wine Blogs to Follow."

In 2019, Wine Folly united with the Global Wine Database, forming the entity known as Folly Enterprises.

In 2022, Wine Folly partnered with Paso Robles Wine Country Alliance and created a Paso Robles Region guide.
