= FoodPair =

- Website type: Recipe Search Engine
- Available in: English
- Headquarters: San Francisco, California, U.S.
- Website: www.foodpair.com
- Commercial: Yes
- Registration: Optional, Free
- Launched: 2011
- Current status: Online

FoodPair is a recipe search engine based in San Francisco, California. It was founded by former Google employee Raj Irukulla in 2010 and is privately held.

== Features ==
FoodPair allows users to find and filter recipes based on ingredient, keyword, diet, course, number of ingredients and source site. The site's faceted search interface gives users with the ability to refine search criteria incrementally.

== Reception ==
In August 2010, PC Magazine included FoodPair in its Top 100 Sites of 2010. Other food related websites included in the list were AllRecipes and Epicurious.

FoodPair was also named a Good Online Cooking Guide for the Beginner Cook by MakeUseOf.com. Trend Central featured FoodPair as a site that helps home cooks streamline their online recipe searching.

== See also ==
- First We Feast
