= Aramark =

Food service and facilities services provider

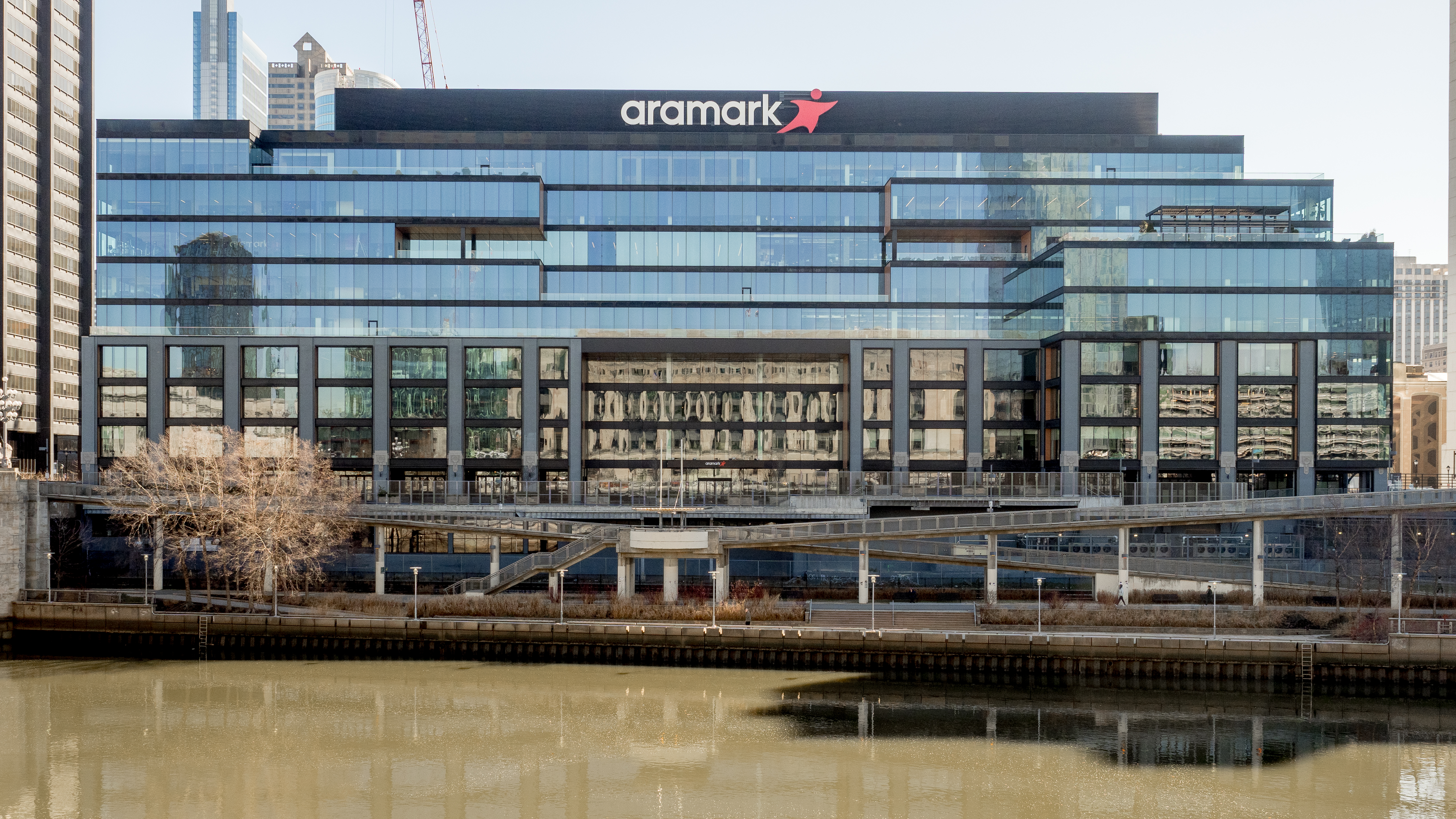
- Headquarters in Philadelphia, Pennsylvania
- Formerly: Davidson Brothers; Automatic Retailers of America
- Type: Public
- Traded as: NYSE: ARMK; S&P 400 component
- Industry: Food and Facilities Services
- Founded: 1936; 90 years ago (as Davidson Brothers); 1959; 67 years ago (as Automatic Retailers of America)
- Founders: Davre Davidson; Henry Davidson
- Headquarters: Philadelphia, Pennsylvania, United States
- Area served: Global
- Key people: John Zillmer (CEO); Stephen Sadove (chairman); Marc Bruno (COO, US); Carl Mittleman (COO, International)
- Products: Outsourcing
- Revenue: ▲US$18.5 billion (2025)
- Operating income: ▲US$792 million (2025)
- Net income: ▲US$326 million (2025)
- Total assets: ▲US$13.3 billion (2025)
- Total equity: ▲US$3.15 billion (2025)
- Number of employees: 278,390 (2025)
- Website: aramark.com
- Footnotes; Financials as of October 3, 2025.

Aramark is an American food service and facilities services provider to clients in areas including education, prisons, healthcare, business, and leisure. It operates in North America (United States and Canada) and an additional 14 countries, including the United Kingdom, Germany, Chile, Ireland, and Spain.

It also provides most food served on Amtrak trains.

The company is headquartered in Center City, Philadelphia, Pennsylvania. Aramark's revenues totaled US $18.854 billion in 2023, and the company was listed as the 21st-largest employer on the Fortune 500.

== History ==
=== Davidson Brothers and beginnings of ARA ===
Aramark was founded as Davidson Brothers in 1936 by Davre and Henry Davidson. Davidson Brothers began by providing vending services to plant employees in the aviation industry in Southern California.

In 1959, Davre Davidson partnered with William Fishman to establish ARA (Automatic Retailers of America), which became publicly traded a year later in 1960.

In 1968, ARA provided services at the Mexico City Olympic Games, the first of 16 Games they have serviced, including Athens in 2004 and Beijing in 2008.

In 1969, ARA amended its name and became known as ARA Services, intended to reflect its growing range of businesses.

In 1983, Joseph Neubauer was elected CEO of ARA Services, and a year later, Neubauer led a group of executives to fend off a hostile takeover bid by coordinating a management buyout.

=== Rename to Aramark and 2006 Neubauer takeover ===
ARA Services changed its name again to its present name, Aramark, in 1994.

In 2001, Aramark returned to the New York Stock Exchange as a public company under the RMK ticker.

In 2006, a group of investors led by Neubauer (and including CCMP Capital, Goldman Sachs Alternatives, Thomas H. Lee Partners, and Warburg Pincus) proposed the acquisition of all outstanding shares of the Aramark Corporation, which was approved by shareholders. The merger was completed in 2007.

=== Acquisitions, innovations and present leadership ===
Since the 2000s after its renaming, Aramark has increased its frequency of acquisitions, mostly in the US and Ireland. Its first was in 2000, Aramark purchased the concessions arm of the Ogden Corporation for $225 million in cash and $11 million in assumed debt, expanding its business to locations that included several major sports league venues, such as Staples Center in Los Angeles, and the Arrowhead Pond and Edison International Field in Anaheim. Aramark followed this with a 2004 acquisition of a 90% stake in Campbell Catering, an Irish firm. Two years later, Aramark acquired Seamless (today a subsidiary of Grubhub), though it sold its stake in 2012. The company then acquired Van Houtte USA from Green Mountain Coffee Roasters (today part of Keurig Dr Pepper) in 2011. In 2015, Aramark expanded its footprint in the Irish retail and premium hospitality sector by acquiring Avoca, an Irish lifestyle brand and food hall operator, for a reported €60 million.

Aramark additionally gained traction in the press for its innovations starting in 2009. In July of that year, Aramark and the Colorado Rockies opened what is believed to be the first gluten-free concession stand in major league baseball. By 2010, Aramark made gluten-free foods available at all 12 of its major league baseball accounts. Aramark partnered with The Humane Society in August 2017 as part of their initiative to increase plant-based food offerings for consumers. The training partnership includes a series of plant-based culinary trainings over a six-month period.

In May 2012, Aramark announced that its board of directors had elected Eric J. Foss as CEO and that Neubauer would remain the company's Chairman. In December 2014, Joseph Neubauer announced his retirement and Foss was elected as the company's next chairman. Foss remained as CEO until his retirement in August 2019; he was succeeded by John Zillmer in October that same year.

In 2023, Aramark spun off its uniform services division into an independent publicly traded company, Vestis.

== Purchasing ==
Aramark negotiates pricing and makes purchases directly from national manufacturers and through distributors such as Sysco Corporation. The products range from healthcare, dairy, meats, seafood, frozen, canned and dry, paper & disposables, chemicals & janitorial, supplies & equipment, produce, and beverage. Aramark has had distribution agreements with Sysco (Note: "Aramark's size provides it with some notable advantages. lts distribution agreement with Sysco accounts for roughly 58% of its food-service products. This large portion of business ...") for more than 20 years.

In 2016, Aramark strengthened its purchasing power through acquiring the group purchasing organization HPSI. In 2017, Aramark acquired the group purchasing organization Avendra.

== Controversies ==
=== Injuries due to negligent National Park Service concession maintenance ===
In 2022, Aramark was repeatedly ordered to repair documented "extensive deterioration and rot of railings", but in June 2023, "a guest fell from the porch of the Clark building of the Wawona Hotel after the railing failed when leaned on," according to a National Park Service report.

=== Labor disputes ===
In April 2010, Aramark and the Coalition of Immokalee Workers reached a resolution that called for a 70–80% increase in wages for tomato pickers.

Aramark has also been the subject of a number of scandals regarding labor practices and business ethics. These include firing workers for reporting unsanitary food conditions, paying fringe wages, not paying for all hours worked, not paying backpay, and firing or eliminating the positions of those who file Equal Employment Opportunity Commission (EEOC) claims.

In September 2024, Aramark concessions workers with UNITE HERE at the South Philadelphia Sports Complex initiated a four-day strike, seeking a better contract. Major grievances included low wages, insufficient health insurance, and the separate counting of hours worked at different facilities to avoid full-time classification and benefits. Workers asked fans to continue boycotting the concessions stands and buying team merchandise online.

=== Food safety issues ===
In 2013, an investigation by journalist Chris Hedges discovered that the food provided to inmates at Burlington County Jail in New Jersey was substandard and spoiled, and often made prisoners sick with diarrhea and vomiting. Maggots found in the food preparation areas at Parnall Correctional Facility in Jackson, Michigan, may have been the source of an outbreak of food-borne illness. Maggots were also found in Aramark food products at Michigan's Charles Egeler Reception & Guidance Center and two Ohio prisons, the Ohio Reformatory for Women and Trumbull Correctional Institute. Aramark, however, was cleared by the Michigan Department of Corrections of any responsibility for inmate illness and for pests in Michigan. Ohio and Michigan fined Aramark $270,000 and $200,000, respectively.

In April 2015, the managing board of The Cavalier Daily, a student-run newspaper at the University of Virginia, reported that Aramark literally "served garbage" to inmates in the Saginaw Correctional Facility in Freeland, Michigan. It also noted that Aramark has in the past "underfed inmates and fed them dog food, worms and scraps of food from old meals" and argued that the university should reconsider its relationship with the food services contractor in light of these ethical issues. Michigan's oversight of Aramark's performance was criticized as inadequate in a report released in August 2015 by the group Progress Michigan after Michigan moved to end the contract.

Likewise, Aramark has been criticized for skimping portion sizes, food safety issues, and overcharging state governments (Michigan, Kentucky, and Florida) that have used their food in prisons; a Kentucky prison riot is reputed to have been caused by the low quality of food Aramark provided to inmates.

=== Direct provision asylum centres ===
In Ireland, Aramark has been criticised for its management of three direct provision centres, where those seeking asylum in Ireland must stay until their application is complete, sometimes for a matter of years. Activists have called for boycotting Aramark for profiting off the direct provision system, as well as the alleged mistreatment of asylum seekers in Aramark-run centres.

In 2014, asylum seekers in County Meath launched a hunger strike over the "unacceptable living standards" in the Aramark-run centre. In 2018, Aramark was forced to apologise after a mother of three from Zimbabwe was refused a slice of bread for her sick child. Soon after, the Union of Students in Ireland (USI) voted to support a boycott of Aramark over its direct provision links, following on from the "Aramark off our campus" campaigns at Trinity College Dublin (TCD), University College Dublin (UCD), and the University of Limerick.

=== Trademark dispute with Delaware North ===
Delaware North provided visitor services to Yosemite National Park from 1991 to 2015. In 2015 Aramark took over these services and Delaware North then sued, saying that they (Delaware North) owned the trademarks to the names of the various Yosemite hotels, lodges, campgrounds, etc. After about three years the suit was settled and the names were restored.

== Notable clients ==
=== Chicago Public Schools ===
Aramark has been criticized for the "filthy conditions" in Chicago Public Schools following the privatization of janitorial services and Aramark receiving a $260 million contract for their management. Responding to these reports, Chicago Mayor Rahm Emanuel said "Aramark's job is to clean the schools, so our principals and teachers can focus on their fundamental responsibility: education. They will either live up to that contract and clean up the schools or they can clean out their desks and get out."

=== Wichita Falls Independent School District ===
Aramark was hired for $2.65 million per year to provide janitorial services on 28 schools and three administration buildings by the Wichita Falls Independent School District in 2015. The district cancelled Aramark's contract and hired another firm because of numerous complaints about bad service. A report issued by the Wichita Falls-Wichita County Public Health District determined that one high school was infested with rats and mice. Janet Powell, the district's director of support services said, "Everyone on the committee felt lied to and deceived (by Aramark)."

=== Ohio Department of Rehabilitation and Correction ===
Since 2013, numerous Aramark employees providing food services in Ohio prisons have been fired or otherwise disciplined for inappropriate behavior towards prisoners such as sexual relations, letter writing, and smuggling contraband. At least 204 Aramark employees have been banned from entering Ohio prisons for such violations. On December 1, 2015, inmates working in the kitchen under Aramark management held a strike because they were required to cut meat with pan lids instead of being allowed to use meat slicers. An Aramark employee was given a written reprimand over the incident.

Since the state started using Aramark in 2013, the Ohio Civil Services Employee Association has been trying to regain control of the food services contract. A bid submitted by the union in spring of 2015 failed after a state review found it did not properly reflect projected costs. Aramark's contract was renewed. The head of the union said Aramark "continues to violate their contract every day with food shortages, health and safety violations, bad employee conduct, low food quality." As of late 2015, the union was pursuing arbitration against the state over this contract.

In 2014, Aramark was issued two fines totaling $272,200 for contract violations. The state offered to credit money spent on additional employee training towards the fines. The same year nine Aramark employees were fired for contraband violations and 15 were fired for "security violations."

An inspection conducted by the Ohio State Corrections officials on June 30, 2014 discovered maggots in the Ohio Reformatory for Women in Marysville. Similar findings occurred in Michigan and Kansas correctional facilities.

=== Cage-free eggs ===
In 2017, Aramark committed to sourcing 100% cage-free eggs globally by 2025, responding to pressure from governmental regulations and animal activist groups.

== See also ==
- Prison–industrial complex
