= Vinopedia.hr =

Croatian online wine encyclopedia

- Website type: Online encyclopedia
- Available in: Croatian
- Editor: Ivan Sokolić
- Website: www.vinopedia.hr
- Commercial: No
- Registration: None
- Launched: 23 November 2008; 17 years ago
- Current status: Active
- Content license: Creative Commons Attribution-Noncommercial-No Derivative Works-compatible license (CC BY-NC-ND)
- Written in: MediaWiki

Vinopedia.hr is a Croatian online wine encyclopedia.

Vinopedia.hr was launched in 2008 by Ivan Sokolić (1930–2014), one of the most prominent Croatian enologists and wine writers. Its content is based on the Grand Lexicon of Viticulture and Vinification (Croatian: Veliki vinogradarsko-vinarski leksikon), Sokolić's 580-page reference work published in 2006.

As of November 2012, Vinopedia had 2,232 articles, and had amassed a total of 2.355 million page views. Translation of content to English, German and Italian is planned, followed by French and Russian.
