= Henrique De Castro =

Business executive

- Born: 1966 or 1967 (age 59–60)
- Education: University of Lisbon (Licenciature in Business Administration); International Institute for Management Development (MBA)
- Board member of: Target, First Data

Henrique De Castro is a business executive who is currently a board director at Banco Santander S.A (BMAD: SAN), Fiserv. Inc. (NASDAQ: FISV) and Target Corporation (NYSE: TGT). He was a board director of First Data Corporation (NYSE: FDC) from 2017 until its merger with Fiserv. Inc.

== Education ==
De Castro received a Bachelor of Arts and a Master of Science from the Instituto Superior de Gestão in Lisbon, Portugal, which he attended from 1985 to 1990. He received a Master of Business Administration degree from the International Institute for Management Development in Lausanne, Switzerland He is fluent in English, Italian, French, Spanish, and Portuguese.

== Career ==
De Castro is a native of Portugal. He began his career at Asea Brown Boveri (ABB) in corporate project finance and private equity.

De Castro later served as a consultant at McKinsey & Company. He was also the Sales & Business Development Director for Dell Western Europe Region, where he managed sales and operations across nine countries.

=== Google ===
De Castro was director of sales and business development at Dell from 2004 to 2006. He joined Google in July 2006, managing media, sales and platforms for EMEA (Europe, Middle East and Africa). In April 2009, he became director and later vice-president and president of Google's media, mobile and platforms organization, with responsibility for $5 billion in annual business, including TV Ads, YouTube Ads, Google Display Network, Mobile Ads, AdMob, AdExchange and DoubleClick. He led the team to launch operations in 50+ countries, hired over 1,000 people, and acquired and integrated Google's two largest acquisitions.

From March to November 2012, De Castro was president of Google's worldwide Partner Business Solutions group, where he was responsible for advertising platforms and services for Google's publisher and commerce partners.

=== Yahoo Inc. ===
De Castro was appointed chief operating officer of Yahoo in November 2012 by its new CEO Marissa Mayer. He was Mayer's "first major hire to be her No. 2" and was the highest paid COO in the country.

As COO, de Castro was responsible for strategic and operational management of Yahoo's sales, media, business development and operations worldwide, with an annual budget of $5 billion.

He was later fired in 2013 just 15 months later by Marissa Mayer, having made $50 million during his time there, and was given a $58 million severance package.

=== Board memberships ===
In February 2019, De Castro was publicly announced as a newly elected board of directors member by Banco Santander S.A., a component of the Euro Stoxx 50 Market Index and one of the 20 largest banks in the World. In July 2017, De Castro was elected to the board of directors of First Data Corporation, the global leader in payment solutions serving over 6 million merchants. De Castro was elected to the board of directors of Minneapolis-based retailer Target Corporation in March 2013, a position he currently holds. De Castro was a board director of the Interactive Advertising Bureau (IAB), an industry association that comprises 500+ leading media and technology companies, and sets the agenda to educate marketers, agencies, media companies and regulators on Interactive Advertising.
