= Just A Pinch Recipes =

Digital recipe and social network

- Website type: Digital recipe and coupon social network hub
- Headquarters: Nashville, Tennessee, United States
- Owner: American Hometown Media
- Creator: Dan Hammond
- Website: justapinch.com
- Commercial: Yes
- Users: 4 million monthly
- Launched: 2010; 16 years ago

Just A Pinch Recipes is a digital recipe sharing website. It allows users to upload and share recipes. The site, which is based in Nashville, Tennessee, was founded 2010 by Dan Hammond, and is a subsidiary of his company American Hometown Media.
