= LevelUp =

American mobile ordering platform

- Company type: Private
- Website type: Mobile Payments, Online food ordering (delivery and pickup)
- Available in: English
- Dissolved: September 30, 2021; 5 years ago
- Successor: Grubhub Direct
- Headquarters: Boston, Massachusetts, United States
- Area served: Worldwide
- Founder: Seth Priebatsch
- Employees: 200
- Website: www.thelevelup.com
- Registration: Required
- Launched: March 2011; 15 years ago
- Current status: Inactive

LevelUp was an American white-label platform for restaurants offering mobile ordering, QR-code payments and loyalty/CRM tools. It was created by Boston-based startup SCVNGR. Grubhub announced its acquisition of LevelUp for US$390 million in July 2018 and closed the deal on September 13, 2018. Post-acquisition, LevelUp’s technology was integrated into Grubhub’s restaurant-facing products, including the self-service Grubhub Direct launched in 2021. The standalone LevelUp consumer app was discontinued on September 30, 2021.

== History ==
LevelUp was initially launched in March 2011, and operated for its first 3 months as a daily deals platform. In July 2011, LevelUp shifted away from daily deals to focus exclusively on facilitating mobile payments. In July 2013, around 200,000 users and 3,000 companies were using LevelUp. In October 2014, around 14,000 stores were using LevelUp. In May 2017, they announced that they had raised $50 million in funding, with over 50,000 locations and more than 200 brands using Levelup.

== Overview ==
The LevelUp mobile application for iPhone, Android and Windows Phone allowed registered users to securely link their debit or credit card to a unique QR code displayed within the app. To pay with LevelUp, users scanned the QR code on their phone at LevelUp terminals located at local businesses who accept LevelUp as a form of payment.

Some merchants that accepted LevelUp as a form of payment also offered monetary savings to users. Users are given “First-Time Visit Specials” the first time they made a transaction at the merchant's location. Users could also unlock "credit" to a merchant's store after spending a certain amount at the merchant's location.

As of June 2016, LevelUp was available for businesses in the Boston, Chicago, Washington DC, Northern Virginia, Philadelphia, St. Louis, New York City, Atlanta, San Francisco, Dallas, San Diego, Minneapolis, Montgomery, Kansas City, Seattle, and Wilmington (North Carolina) areas.

In early 2018, the company announced the release of Broadcast, enabling restaurant brands to reach new customers by allowing them to browse live menus, order ahead and pay directly from high-traffic apps such as Facebook, Messenger, Yelp, Foursquare, Amazon Alexa and Chase Pay.

As of September 30, 2021, the LevelUp app is no longer available.
