= Seamless (company) =

American food ordering service

Seamless North America LLC
- Formerly: SeamlessWeb
- Type: Subsidiary
- Industry: Internet
- Founded: December 1999; 26 years ago
- Founders: Jason Finger; Paul Appelbaum; Todd Arky; Andy Appelbaum
- Headquarters: New York City, New York
- Number of employees: 300+ (January 2012)
- Parent: Grubhub
- Website: www.seamless.com

Seamless North America LLC (formerly SeamlessWeb) is an online food ordering service that allows users to order food for delivery and takeout from restaurants through their website or suite of mobile apps.

== History ==
Logo used under Just Eat Takeaway ownership

Seamless was launched in 1999 by Jason Finger, Paul Appelbaum, Todd Arky and Andy Appelbaum as SeamlessWeb, providing companies with a web-based system for ordering food from restaurants and caterers. Starting in 2005, Seamless was made available to individual users and they currently partner with over 12,000 restaurants, serve over 4,000 companies, and have over 2,000,000 members in the United States and in London. The service is available for personal orders in New York City, Boston, Philadelphia, Washington, DC, Miami, Chicago, Houston, Austin, Seattle, San Francisco, Los Angeles, and London. It was acquired by Aramark in April 2006. On June 8, 2011, Spectrum Equity Investors made a $50 million minority investment in Seamless and the company was spun out of Aramark into an independent entity.

On June 28, 2011, SeamlessWeb notified their clients they had changed their name to Seamless.

In May 2013, Seamless announced the signing of an agreement to merge with GrubHub, creating a combined company with a higher order volume and improved regional coverage.

On August 9, 2013, Seamless and GrubHub completed their merger and now operate under the name GrubHub, Inc. (formerly known as GrubHub Seamless). The merger resulted in connecting diners with approximately 25,000 restaurants for online and mobile-ordering across the United States and in London. In the first half of 2013, the combined organization processed approximately 130,000 orders per day.

== Recognition ==
SeamlessWeb was recognized as the 4th fastest-growing private company in the United States in the 2004 Inc. 500 list. The company had the highest rate of revenue growth among New York state technology companies in the 2005 Deloitte Technology Fast 50 program, and was selected as one of TIME magazine's 50 Coolest Web Sites for 2006.

In August 2009, SeamlessWeb was featured on the MSN web series Cool Runnings. In the episode, entitled "Carving a Niche in Online Food Delivery", host Antonio Neves interviewed key personnel at SeamlessWeb, along with the restaurants and companies they work with, providing insights into how SeamlessWeb began and how it thrived.

Jason Finger, co-founder and long-time CEO, won the 2007 Ernst & Young Entrepreneur of the Year Award for E-Services.

== See also ==
- Tech companies in the New York metropolitan area
