= EatStreet =

Food ordering and delivery service

EatStreet Inc.
- Company type: Private
- Industry: Online food ordering
- Founded: Madison, Wisconsin (2010)
- Headquarters: Madison, Wisconsin
- Area served: United States
- Number of employees: 1
- Website: eatstreet.com

EatStreet Inc. is an American online food ordering service that acts as a centralized marketplace, where diners can order delivery and takeout from restaurants in their area. Founded in 2010 in Madison, Wisconsin, the company has expanded to over 15,000 restaurants in over 150 markets nationwide. In addition to the online ordering platform, EatStreet also offers restaurants custom websites, mobile apps, Facebook ordering, and digital marketing services. As of August 2023, EatStreet no longer employs W2 drivers to deliver customer orders. They now contract with multiple third-party delivery services to complete deliveries nationwide.

== History ==
Previous logo

Initially launched by three University of Wisconsin–Madison students, co-founders Matt Howard, Eric Martell, and Alex Wyler on February 1, 2010, the company began as BadgerBites and operated solely in Madison, Wisconsin. In August 2011, the company began expanding into additional markets, focusing on tier 2 and 3 cities, especially those with colleges and universities.

After launching fifteen sister sites to BadgerBites, the company launched a redesigned website to consolidate all of their restaurants and markets as well as begin national expansion under the new name "EatStreet” on January 21, 2013. In February 2013, the company raised $2.45 million in a Series A investment round. Later that year, EatStreet was named the No. 2 "Food Delivery Startup to Watch" by StrategyEye and CEO Matt Howard was named to Madison Magazine's 2013 "M List" honoring entrepreneurial excellence.

In early 2014, EatStreet partnered with the National Restaurant Association as part of the association's Extreme Digital Makeover promotion. EatStreet partnered with Yelp in June 2014 to allow online users to order food directly from Yelp's restaurant pages. A few months later, EatStreet's Series B funding reached a total of $8.4 million in February 2014.

In spring of 2015, Howard, Martell and Wyler were named finalists for the EY Entrepreneur Of The Year Award in the Midwest. In December of the same year, EatStreet secured a Series C investment round, totaling $26 million.

EatStreet was named one of Madison's top places to work by Madison Magazine in September 2016, drawing comparisons to Silicon Valley–based companies for their authentic tech startup culture.

In fall of 2017, EatStreet's Howard and Wyler were named to Forbes 30 Under 30 in Consumer Technology.

In February 2017, EatStreet implemented their own delivery services in ten cities following their acquisition of Philadelphia-based food delivery company, Zoomer. As of May 2017, the company employs roughly 200 corporate employees and over 800 delivery drivers. The company is venture-backed.

=== Data breach ===
In 2019 EatStreet had a data breach and information including names, phone numbers, email addresses, and routing numbers for restaurants and delivery services, in addition to EatStreet customer information including names, last four credit card numbers, expiration dates, billing addresses, email addresses, and phone numbers were accessed. The criminal claimed to have access to six million accounts.

According to the disclosure EatStreet released in July 2019, the unauthorized party breached its computer network on May 3 and proceeded to access and download information from its database, until May 17, when the company discovered the intrusion.

=== Wage theft lawsuits ===
In 2020, three delivery drivers sued EatStreet for wage theft, accusing EatStreet of failing to reimburse mileage expenses and using tips to meet minimum wage requirements. EatStreet agreed to a $1.2 million settlement, but later in December reported that it would not be able to honor its settlement offer due to financial circumstances.

=== Virtual markets ===
In 2021, EatStreet opened a virtual convenience store and ghost kitchens as a part of a new EatStreet subsidiary, HungerHub LLC. A year later, EatStreet abruptly shut down HungerHub.

=== Driver layoffs ===
In August 2023, EatStreet announced that it would be laying off its W-2 drivers and switching to deliveries through contract providers.

=== Bankruptcy ===
On October 11, 2024, EatStreet filed for Chapter 11 bankruptcy protection. The company exited bankruptcy in July 2025 and continues to operate.
