= Grubhub =

American restaurant food delivery service

Grubhub Inc.
- Logo used since 2025
- Formerly: GrubHub Seamless Inc. (2013–2014)
- Type: Private
- Traded as: NYSE: GRUB (2014–2021)
- Industry: Online food ordering
- Founded: 2004; 22 years ago
- Founders: Matt Maloney; Mike Evans
- Headquarters: Chicago, Illinois, US
- Area served: United States
- Key people: Brian McAndrews (Chairman); Matthew Maloney (CEO)
- Services: Food delivery
- Revenue: ▲US$1.82 billion (2020)
- Operating income: ▼ −US$149 million (2020)
- Net income: ▼ −US$156 million (2020)
- Total assets: ▲US$2.39 billion (2020)
- Total equity: ▼US$1.42 billion (2020)
- Number of employees: ▲2,841 (Feb 2021)
- Parent: Wonder Group Inc.
- Subsidiaries: BiteGrabber; Eat24; LevelUp; Seamless; Tapingo; OrderUp
- Website: www.grubhub.com

Grubhub Inc. (stylized in all caps) is an American online and mobile prepared food ordering and delivery platform based in Chicago, Illinois. As of 2019, it had 19.9 million active users, with 115,000 associated restaurants in 3,200 cities in all 50 US states.

Grubhub Seamless went public in 2014 and was traded on the New York Stock Exchange (NYSE) under the ticker symbol GRUB. The firm has been criticized for antitrust price manipulation, listing restaurants without permission, and allegedly misclassifying workers.

Founded in 2004, it became a subsidiary of the Dutch company Just Eat Takeaway after 2021. However, in 2025, it was announced that Grubhub was purchased by Wonder Group Inc., in a deal valued at $650 million.

== History ==
=== Grubhub history ===
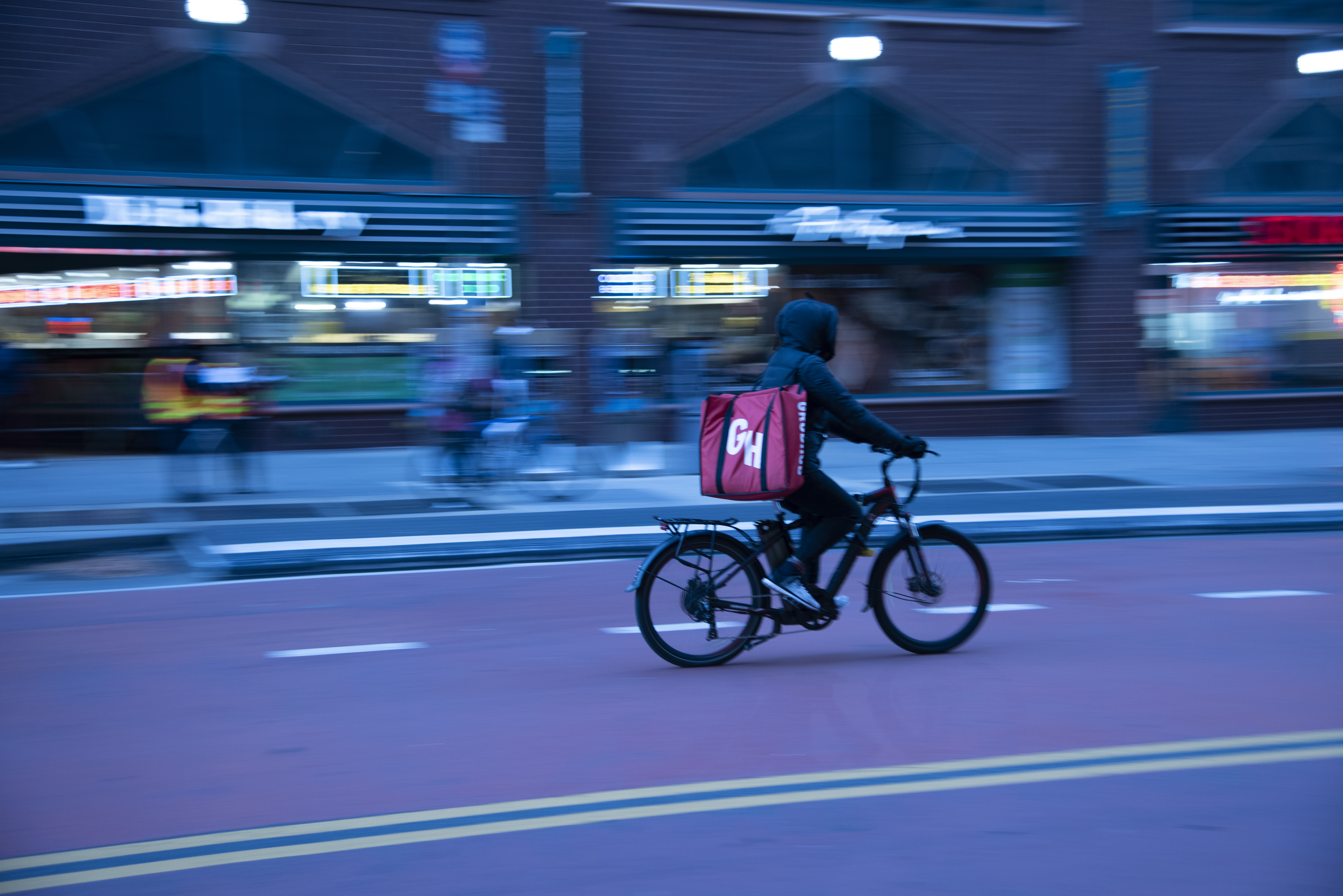
GrubHub bike delivery service, New York City in 2017

The original Chicago-based Grubhub was founded in 2004 by Mike Evans and Matt Maloney to create an alternative to paper menus. Two years later, in 2006, Maloney and Evans won first place in the University of Chicago Booth School of Business's Edward L. Kaplan New Venture Challenge with the business plan for Grubhub.

In November 2007, Grubhub secured $1.1 million in Series A funding, led by Amicus Capital and Origin Ventures for the purpose of expanding into San Francisco and New York markets. In March 2009, Grubhub earned $2 million in Series B funding, led by Origin Ventures and Leo Capital, which was followed by $11 million in Series C funding, led by Benchmark Capital in November 2010. In March 2011 $20 million in Series D funding raise was led by DAG Ventures.

Grubhub's portfolio of brands includes Seamless, AllMenus, MenuPages, LevelUp, and Tapingo. Seamless is an online and mobile food ordering platform for regional restaurants active in the U.S. and London.

In September 2011, Grubhub secured $50 million in Series E funding and acquired New York–based competitor Dotmenu, the parent company of Allmenus and Campusfood. Grubhub completed the acquisition of AllMenus that month. MenuPages was acquired by Seamless in September 2011.

DiningIn, an online ordering and food delivery company based in Brighton, Massachusetts, was acquired by Grubhub in February 2015. Restaurants on the Run, a corporate food delivery company based in Aliso Viejo, California, was acquired by Grubhub in February 2015.

In December 2015, Grubhub acquired Delivered Dish, a restaurant delivery service in seven markets across the Pacific Northwest and Southwest, including Denver, Las Vegas, San Diego, Portland, El Paso, and Albuquerque. LAbite, a Los Angeles–based restaurant delivery service, was acquired by Grubhub in May 2016.

Grubhub logo from 2016 until Just Eat Takeaway acquired Grubhub in 2021

In July 2017, Grubhub acquired assets in 27 OrderUp markets; it completed the purchase of the remaining 11 franchisee-owned markets on October 30, 2018.

In August 2017, Grubhub agreed to acquire Eat24 from Yelp for $287.5 million, subject to regulatory review. In October 2017, Grubhub announced that it had completed its acquisition of Eat24. In late 2018 Grubhub shut down the Eat24 brand.

LevelUp, a Boston-based diner engagement and payment solutions platform was acquired by Grubhub in September 2018. The acquisition of LevelUp was for a reported $390 million cash. LevelUp’s technology was integrated into Grubhub’s restaurant-facing products and later underpinned the launch of Grubhub Direct in 2021, while LevelUp consumer app was discontinued on September 30, 2021.

Tapingo, a San Francisco–based platform for campus food ordering was acquired by Grubhub in November 2018 for approximately $150 million. Tapingo’s campus-ordering functionality was integrated into the Grubhub app (Campus Dining) and the Tapingo app was phased out during 2019.

In March 2019, Grubhub took over SkipTheDishes' operations in the United States after SkipTheDishes announced its exit from the U.S. market. By mid-2020, in the middle of the coronavirus pandemic where demand for services delivering food from restaurants and takeaways surged, Grubhub announced it was keeping its drivers safe by offering contact-free delivery as well as the option to order pickup for anyone who felt more comfortable getting the food themselves.

On June 9, 2020, Netherlands based Just Eat Takeaway announced an agreement to buy Grubhub for $7.3 billion in stock. In January 2025, two months after a deal valued at $650 million, it was announced that Just Eat Takeaway had completed the sale of Grubhub to Wonder Group.

=== Grubhub and Seamless merger ===
In 1999, New York lawyer Jason Finger founded SeamlessWeb to provide companies with a web-based system for ordering food from restaurants and caterers. Six years later, in 2005, SeamlessWeb introduced a free ordering service to consumer diners to complement the existing corporate-ordering service. In April 2006, SeamlessWeb was acquired by Aramark and integrated into its Food, Hospitalities, and Facilities segment.

Jonathan Zabusky was named president of Seamless in 2009, and by June 2011, Seamless was re-privatized, as Boston-based Spectrum Equity Associates invested $50 million for a minority stake in the company from Aramark. The company then changed its name from SeamlessWeb to Seamless.

In September 2011, Seamless acquired MenuPages, and in February 2012, Seamless released an iPad app.

In May 2013, Grubhub and Seamless announced that they were merging, with Seamless representing 58% of the equity and GrubHub representing 42% of the equity of the combined business; the merger was finalized in early August 2013.

=== IPO ===
Grubhub went public in April 2014 at $26 per share. During its time as a standalone company, it traded on the New York Stock Exchange (NYSE) under the ticker symbol "GRUB".

=== Delivery ===
In June 2014, Grubhub began offering delivery for restaurants that did not operate their own delivery service. By 2016, the company was delivering in more than 50 markets across the U.S. In July 2018, Grubhub announced that it had expanded its delivery capabilities to 28 new cities in the US.

Grubhub's UK competitors are Deliveroo and UberEATS. In the U.S. its competitors include Uber Eats, DoorDash, Postmates, and EatStreet.

In February 2020, the company announced the launch of its new Grubhub+ monthly subscription program, which offers free, unlimited food delivery from partner restaurants for a monthly fee.

In 2021, the company announced a partnership with Yandex to add Yandex delivery robots to the Grubhub platform for food deliveries in colleges.

=== Announced acquisition ===
Logo used between 2021 and 2025, aligned with Just Eat Takeaway branding

On May 12, 2020, Uber announced that it was approaching Grubhub with a takeover offer. However, on June 9, 2020, Just Eat Takeaway announced it would be purchasing Grubhub for $7.3 billion in an all-stock deal. The acquisition would create the largest online food delivery service outside of China, and provide Just Eat Takeaway with a base in the U.S. market. North American headquarters would remain in Chicago with Grubhub founder, Matt Maloney, joining the board of directors and heading North American operations.

On June 10, 2021, Just Eat Takeaway took operations of Grubhub as Grubhub stockholders approved Transaction with Just Eat Takeaway. The sale was completed on June 15, 2021. As part of this, Grubhub's logo was changed to include the Just Eat Takeaway house.

=== Post acquisition ===
In April 2022, Just Eat said that it would consider a full sale of Grubhub after Cat Rock Capital, an activist investor, pressed the company to focus on European markets.

In July 2022, Amazon struck a deal with Just Eat to offer Prime customers free Grubhub+ membership for a year. The partnership allows Amazon to take a 2% stake in the company with the option to acquire up to 15% based on performance. In May 2024, Amazon announced that Grubhub+ would become permanently included with Amazon Prime memberships.

=== In popular culture ===
Throughout 2020, Grubhub released a series of animated television commercials of people ordering food on the app. In January 2021, one of these commercials, called "Delivery Dance", became popular on the internet as a meme, with many people uploading parodies of it. The commercial shows several people dancing after ordering food from Grubhub, set to "Soy Yo" by the Colombian pop band Bomba Estereo. The commercial was panned, as it was seen as too obnoxious. Comparisons were made online between this ad and a similar ad from the grocery store chain Kroger.

== Controversies ==
=== Labor lawsuits ===
==== Lawson vs. Grubhub ====
In February 2018, US Magistrate Judge Jacqueline Scott Corley found that Grubhub correctly classified plaintiff Raef Lawson as an independent contractor and rejected his misclassification claim in the Lawson vs. Grubhub court case.

In a 2017 lawsuit, attorney Shannon Liss-Riordan said that the company re-labels words, using euphemisms like "blocks" instead of "shifts", to justify deliberate misclassification of drivers as contractors.

==== Wallace v. Grubhub Holdings ====
The Wallace v. Grubhub Holdings contractor lawsuit alleges that Carmen Wallace and Broderick Bryant and other drivers were misclassified as independent contractors and Grubhub defied wage-and-hour requirements under the Fair Labor Standards Act, the Illinois Minimum Wage Law, and the California Labor Code.

The plaintiffs in Wallace v. Grubhub claim that the work of these drivers makes them employees rather than independent contractors. Wallace and Bryant argue that drivers work on scheduled shifts, and must work in a certain area. "The drivers as a general matter cannot engage in personal non-work activities during their GrubHub shifts," the complaint states, meaning that they essentially function as employees. They also allege that they do not receive the same benefits that an employee does. Grubhub drivers are allegedly required to pay some of their expenses. Because of how they are paid, the plaintiffs claim they may often get paid below federal or state minimum wage, even when they work long hours. Many drivers allegedly work more than 40 hours a week but do not receive overtime rates for their work.

According to the Grubhub contractor lawsuit, the company violated several FLSA and Illinois laws by failing to pay overtime and failing to pay minimum wage. The plaintiffs filed their class-action Grubhub contractor lawsuit on June 29, 2018, in the U.S. District Court for the Northern District of Illinois.

Broderick and Carmen filed the lawsuit on behalf of themselves and all others in a similar situation and the case is ongoing.

=== Political statement ===
On November 10, 2016, after the victory of President Donald Trump in the general election, Grubhub President and CEO Matt Maloney sent a company-wide memo to employees saying that he rejected the "nationalist, anti-immigrant and hateful politics of Donald Trump" and "If you do not agree with this statement then please reply to this email with your resignation because you have no place here." The Washington Times reported that Maloney "unleashed a political screed after the Nov. 8 election and said that those who disagree with its anti-Trump views should resign."

After a Twitter boycott campaign was initiated, Maloney later claimed his words were "misconstrued", adding "I want to clarify that I did not ask for anyone to resign if they voted for Trump. I would never make such a demand. On the contrary, the message of the email is that we do not tolerate discriminatory activity or hateful commentary in the workplace and that we will stand up for our employees." In a tweet that was later deleted, Maloney added: "To be clear, Grubhub does not tolerate hate and we are proud of all our employees—even those who voted for Trump." By Thursday night, the hashtag #BoycottGrubHub was trending on Twitter. Following Maloney's statement, on November 11, 2016, the company's shares dropped 5.93%.

=== Referral numbers on Yelp listings ===
An August 2019 episode of the podcast Underunderstood reported that Yelp listings for some restaurants provide Grubhub "referral numbers" which, when called instead of the restaurant's phone number itself, facilitate the recording of the calls and can result in the restaurant being charged commission fees, even in some cases when resulting in no order.

=== Cybersquatting ===
In June 2019, reports came out alleging that Grubhub had registered more than 23,000 web domains in restaurants' names without their consent, in what was cast as "an attempt to generate greater commission revenue and prevent restaurants from building their online presences." Grubhub disputed the allegations, insisting that restaurants had explicitly agreed in their contracts with Grubhub to allow web domain purchases and the creation of websites advertising their businesses.

=== Allegations of monopolistic behavior ===
In April 2020, a group of New Yorkers sued DoorDash, GrubHub, Postmates, and Uber Eats, accusing them of using their market power monopolistically by only listing restaurants on their apps if the restaurant owners signed contracts that include clauses that require prices to be the same for dine-in customers as for customers receiving delivery. The plaintiffs state that this arrangement increases the cost for dine-in customers, as they are required to subsidize the cost of delivery; and that the apps charge “exorbitant” fees, which range from 13% to 40% of revenue, while the average restaurant's profit ranges from 3% to 9% of revenue. The lawsuit seeks triple damages, including for overcharges, since April 14, 2016, for dine-in and delivery customers in the United States at restaurants using the defendants' delivery apps. The case is filed in the federal U.S. District Court, Southern District of New York as Davitashvili v GrubHub Inc., 20-cv-3000. Although a number of preliminary documents in the case have now been filed, a trial date has not yet been set.

=== Listing restaurants without permission ===
In October 2020, a group of restaurants launched a class-action suit against Grubhub for having included them in its listings without having asked permission (or, in some cases, despite permission having been denied), because this caused "damage to (the restaurants') reputations, loss of control over their customers’ dining experiences, loss of control over their online presence, and reduced consumer demand for their services"; plaintiffs specifically cited that Grubhub would list obsolete menus with invalid prices and/or unavailable options (leading to customer complaints) and that Grubhub refused to delist restaurants upon request. This practice was banned in California in 2021 for its abuse of restaurants.

=== 2022 New York City free lunch promotion ===
On May 17, 2022, Grubhub offered a promotional code offering free lunch for those ordering in New York City. Grubhub's system and local restaurants were immediately overwhelmed after fielding nearly 6,000 orders per minute. Grubhub released a statement the same day stating they let restaurant workers know in advance, but the claim was immediately disputed by workers. Multiple outlets regarded the promotion as a "disaster," with restaurants unable to keep up with the demand and insufficient delivery workers available to pick up orders, resulting in wasted food and customers without their meals. Restaurants were left facing angry customers, refunded orders, and inability to reach Grubhub's customer service.

=== Price disclosure ===
In November 2022, Pennsylvania Attorney General Josh Shapiro sued Grubhub, claiming that the service failed to properly disclose that prices for food ordered through GrubHub could be higher than the same item ordered at a restaurant. The investigation by the attorney general's office also found that Grubhub would route web traffic from users to microsites that host a restaurant’s menu as well as third-party websites, such as Yelp or Menupages.com. Later that same month, a settlement was announced whereby Gruhub would be required to pay $125,000 to several Pennsylvania food banks and be more transparent about its pricing. As part of the settlement, GrubHub will be required to add price disclosures to their menu and checkout-pages.

=== Food tampering incident ===
In October 2023, local media stations KTLA and KABC-TV reported that a restaurant owner in Long Beach, California, had caught a Grubhub delivery driver eating from and then repackaging an order. The restaurateur was able to intercept the tampered meal after it had already been delivered. The restaurateur wants Grubhub to provide tamper-proof seals, as the current stickers are easily removed "like a piece of Velcro." Grubhub declined a request for an interview following the incident, and released a statement:

We have no tolerance for misconduct on our platform. The vast majority of our orders are completed without incident or complaint, and when things don't go as planned, we work hard to make things right. Upon hearing of this situation, we took immediate action and suspended the driver from our platform. We've also reached out to the diner to address and help resolve the situation.
