= Serve Robotics =

American autonomous delivery robotics company

- Serve Robotics logo and wordmark

- Food delivery robot in Miami, Florida
- Type: Public
- Traded as: Nasdaq: SERV
- Industry: Robotics; Autonomous delivery
- Founded: 2017
- Founder: Ali Kashani
- Headquarters: Redwood City, California
- Number of locations: 7 U.S Citys (2026)
- Key people: Ali Kashani (CEO); Touraj Parang (COO); Brian Read (CFO); Euan Abraham (Chief Hardware & Manufacturing Officer)
- Products: Autonomous delivery robots
- Revenue: ▲US$2.65 million (2025)
- Net income: ▼ −US$101 million (2025)
- Website: Official website

Serve Robotics is an American technology company that designs, develops, and operates autonomous sidewalk delivery robots for last mile food and goods delivery. The company was founded in 2017 as the robotics division of Postmates and later became an independent company following the acquisition of Postmates by Uber Technologies. Serve Robotics operates autonomous delivery robots in multiple United States cities through partnerships with food delivery platforms including Uber Eats and DoorDash.

== History ==
Serve Robotics was established in 2017 as an internal robotics initiative within Postmates, a United States based food delivery company. The division focused on developing autonomous sidewalk delivery robots designed to transport food and retail items in dense urban environments.

In 2020, Postmates was acquired by Uber Technologies. Following the acquisition, Serve Robotics continued development under Uber before spinning out as an independent company in 2021 with seed funding from venture capital firm Neo and participation from Uber.

In August 2023, Serve Robotics announced a reverse merger transaction allowing the company to become publicly traded. The company began trading on the Nasdaq stock exchange under the ticker symbol SERV in 2024.

== Technology ==
Serve Robotics develops electric autonomous delivery robots designed to operate on sidewalks and pedestrian pathways. The robots use a combination of cameras, lidar sensors, and artificial intelligence software to navigate environments, detect obstacles, and comply with pedestrian traffic rules.

== Safety and public response ==
Autonomous delivery have been the subject of public discussion regarding sidewalk safety and accessibility. In 2025, an incident involving a delivery robot and a mobility scooter user in Los Angeles prompted renewed debate over autonomous robot regulation and pedestrian safety standards.

== See also ==
- Delivery robot
- Last mile delivery
- Service robot
