= Starship Technologies =

Company developing small self-driving robotic delivery vehicles

Starship Technologies, Inc.

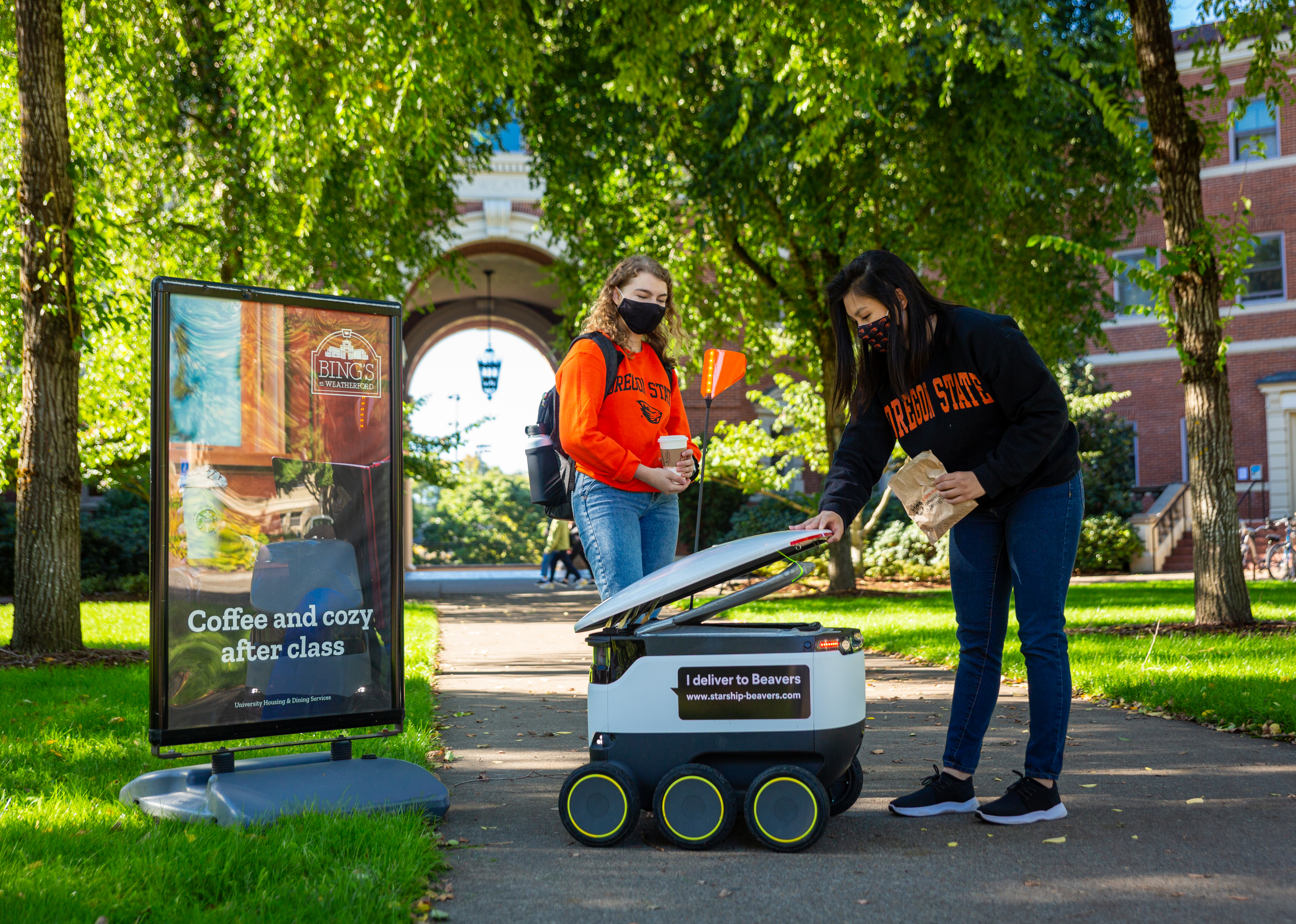
- A Starship robot delivering food to students at Oregon State University
- Type: Private
- Industry: Robotics; Logistics
- Founded: 11 June 2014; 12 years ago in Tallinn, Estonia
- Founders: Janus Friis; Ahti Heinla
- Headquarters: San Francisco, United States
- Areas served: United States; United Kingdom; Germany; Estonia; Finland
- Key people: Ahti Heinla (CEO)
- Products: Delivery robots
- Services: Last mile delivery
- Website: www.starship.xyz

Starship Technologies is an autonomous delivery vehicle company. Originally founded in Estonia in 2014, the company is headquartered in San Francisco, California, with engineering operations in Tallinn, Estonia, and Helsinki, Finland. Starship also has offices in London and Milton Keynes in the United Kingdom and in Hamburg, Germany.

== History ==
Starship Technologies was founded by Skype co-founders Janus Friis and Ahti Heinla in 2014 in Tallinn, Estonia. Heinla and Friis had taken part in a NASA competition, the Centennial Challenge, to design and build autonomous robots to retrieve geological samples. While their team (named 'Kuukulgur', or 'Moon Rover') did not win the competition, Heinla and Friis began working to apply the technology they had developed to the problem of last mile delivery following a meeting in London. Starship Technologies OÜ was registered on 11 June 2014 in Tallinn, Estonia. Starship Technologies, Inc., a Delaware corporation, was registered in San Francisco, United States, on 28 September 2016.

Starship Technologies launched pilot services in 2016, in the US and the UK among other countries, with commercial services launched in 2017. In April 2018, Starship launched its autonomous delivery service in Milton Keynes (England), in partnership with Co-op and Tesco. In March 2020, Starship became the first robot delivery service to operate in a British town center, with the rollout of its service in Central Milton Keynes. By November 2020, Starship declared that Milton Keynes had the 'world's largest autonomous robot fleet'. By March 2023 the company was delivering in seven British cities.

In January 2019, Starship partnered with Sodexo to launch robot food delivery services at George Mason University in Virginia, US. With a fleet of 25 robots at launch, this was the largest implementation of autonomous robot food delivery services on a university campus at that time. In 2019, it expanded its services to six other US universities. (Note: Northern Arizona University in Flagstaff, Purdue University in West Lafayette, University of Pittsburgh, James Madison University in Virginia, University of Wisconsin in Madison, University of Houston, and University of Texas at Dallas) and in 2020 to two more. (Note: University of Mississippi and Bowling Green State University)

In March 2020, following the start of the COVID-19 pandemic, Starship laid off an undisclosed number of employees. However, half a year later, it rehired many of the staff.

In 2022, the company announced the launch of delivery services in Finland.

As of October 2024, Starship's fleet of more than 2,000 robots worldwide had completed 7 million deliveries, driven over 8.5 million miles, and made 150,000 daily road crossings.

== Operations ==
Starship develops and operates electrically-powered last mile delivery robots. The robots ride on sidewalks with a maximum speed of 6 kilometres per hour (3.7 mph) (pedestrian speed), can be remotely controlled if autonomous operation fails, and are only used for relatively short-distance local delivery. The robots use feature detection of edges and mapping techniques to determine the suitability of navigable terrain. They weigh 55 pounds (25 kg) unloaded, and can carry up to 20 pounds (9.1 kg) of deliveries. Their average battery life is 18 hours, and the typical robot can travel around 40 km per day. The robots are equipped with a sensor suite that includes ten stereo and time-of-flight cameras, GPS, ultrasonic sensors, radar and inertial measurement. The robots have loudspeakers to communicate with humans they meet, with a range of optional voices and characters and the ability to play music. Users order Starship deliveries using the company's app or through the existing platforms of retail partners. Once deliveries arrive, users unlock the robots through biometric identity verification.

Before operating commercially the service was tested in over 100 cities and 20 countries around the world. During the COVID-19 pandemic, Starship expanded the number of delivery robots used for grocery in the UK and the US to help with the delivery driver shortage. As of October 2024, the company operates in over 100 locations in the United States, the United Kingdom, Germany, Finland and Estonia.

Between 2018 and 2021, Starship Technologies worked with Milton Keynes Council to conduct a study reviewing the impact of zero-emissions robots in cities. According to the report, Starship's robots "prevented 280,000 car journeys, and over 500,000 miles travelled in cars, leading to 137 tons of CO_{2} saved, and 22 kg of NOx saved during the study period".

== Safety ==
Starship Technologies delivery robots have been involved in notable traffic accidents resulting in injuries to pedestrians and transit passengers. These included a bus collision (October 2026) in Tallinn, when up to nine bus passengers were injured after falling inside the bus; and an accident at Arizona State University in Fall 2023 when a robot collided with a parking attendant.

In June 2026, the British pedestrian charity Living Streets raised concerns to the government about the use of delivery robots on congested pavements, following Starship's announcement of plans to expand.

== Corporate matters ==
The Starship's original headquarters were established in London but were moved to San Francisco in 2018.

In 2014–2018, Allan Martinson served as the chief operating officer of Starship. In 2018, the chief executive officer Ahti Heinla switched to the position of the chief technology officer and Lex Bayer, Airbnb's former head of business development, payments, and Airbnb for business, was hired as the new CEO. Starship hired Alastair Westgarth, former CEO of Google X company, Loon, as their CEO in June 2021. Westgarth left the company and Heinla returned as chief executive in December 2023.

Starship announced a partnership with Veriff in January 2022 to provide authentication and re-verification services for its fleet of autonomous delivery robots in the UK. This partnership made Starship the first company to create an autonomous end-to-end delivery service for age-restricted items.

=== Financial ===
By 2019, Starship had received US$85 million in venture funding. In addition to Janus Friis and Ahti Heinla, other investors include Airbnb co-founder Nathan Blecharczyk, Skype founding engineer Jaan Tallinn, Morpheus Ventures, Shasta Ventures, Matrix Partners, MetaPlanet Holdings, Daimler AG, Grishin Robotics, ZX Ventures, Playfair Capital and others.

In January 2022, Starship received a €50 million investment from the European Investment Bank. In March 2022 the company raised $100 million in investments, bringing total investment raised to $202 million.

In February 2024 the company raised $90 million led by Plural and Iconical, bringing equity funding to $230 million. The company raised another $50 million in funding in October 2025.

In October 2025, Starship announced a $50 million Series C funding round and reported 9 million deliveries, 19 million km driven autonomously (12 million miles) and 2700 robots in its fleet. Its deployment footprint had grown to 270 locations across 7 countries. In 2018, Starship said that its robots cost US$5500 and that it hoped to reduce this to $2250.

== Images ==
Starship Technologies robots in action
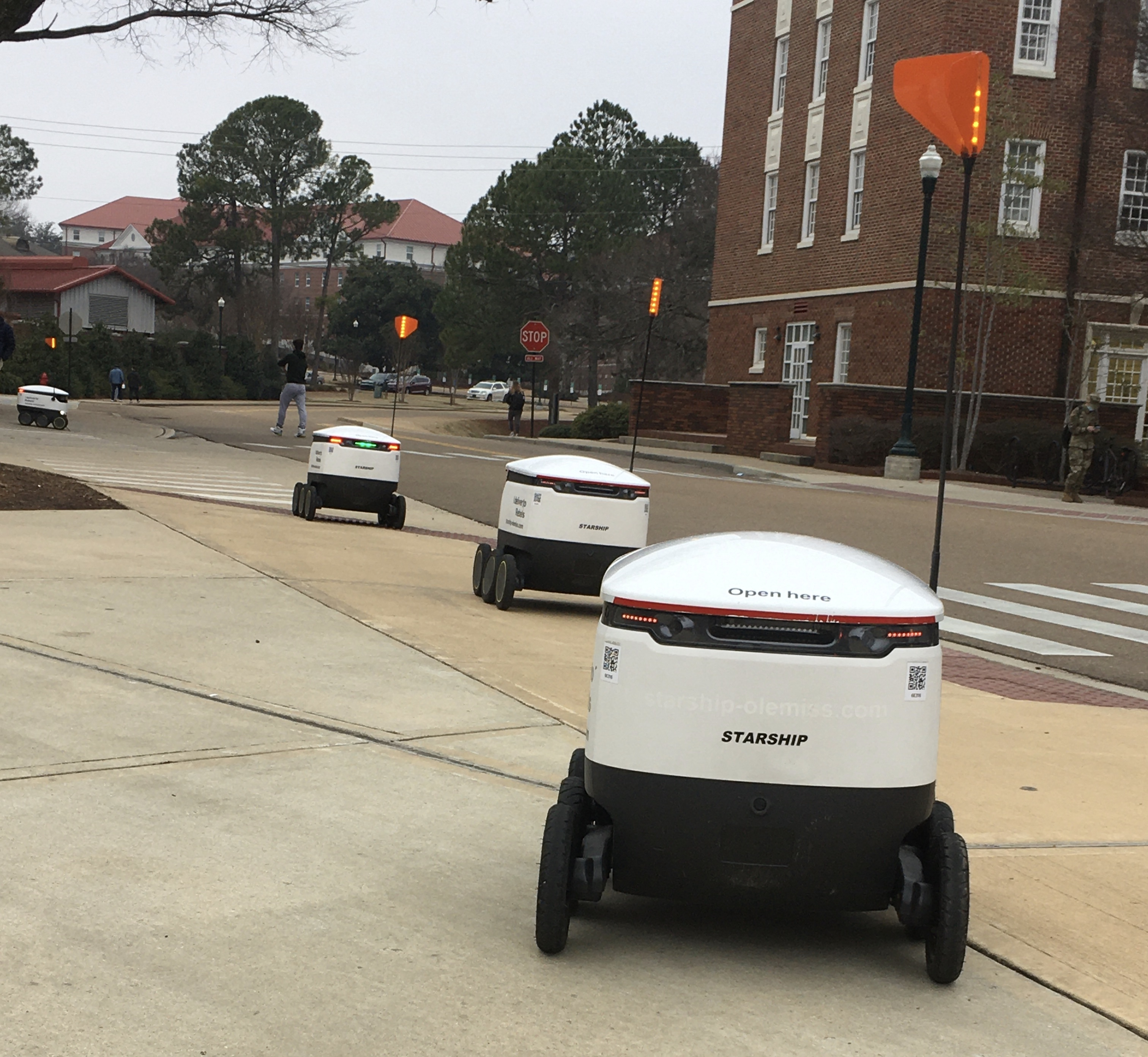
A line of Starship Technologies delivery robots at the University of Mississippi in 2021

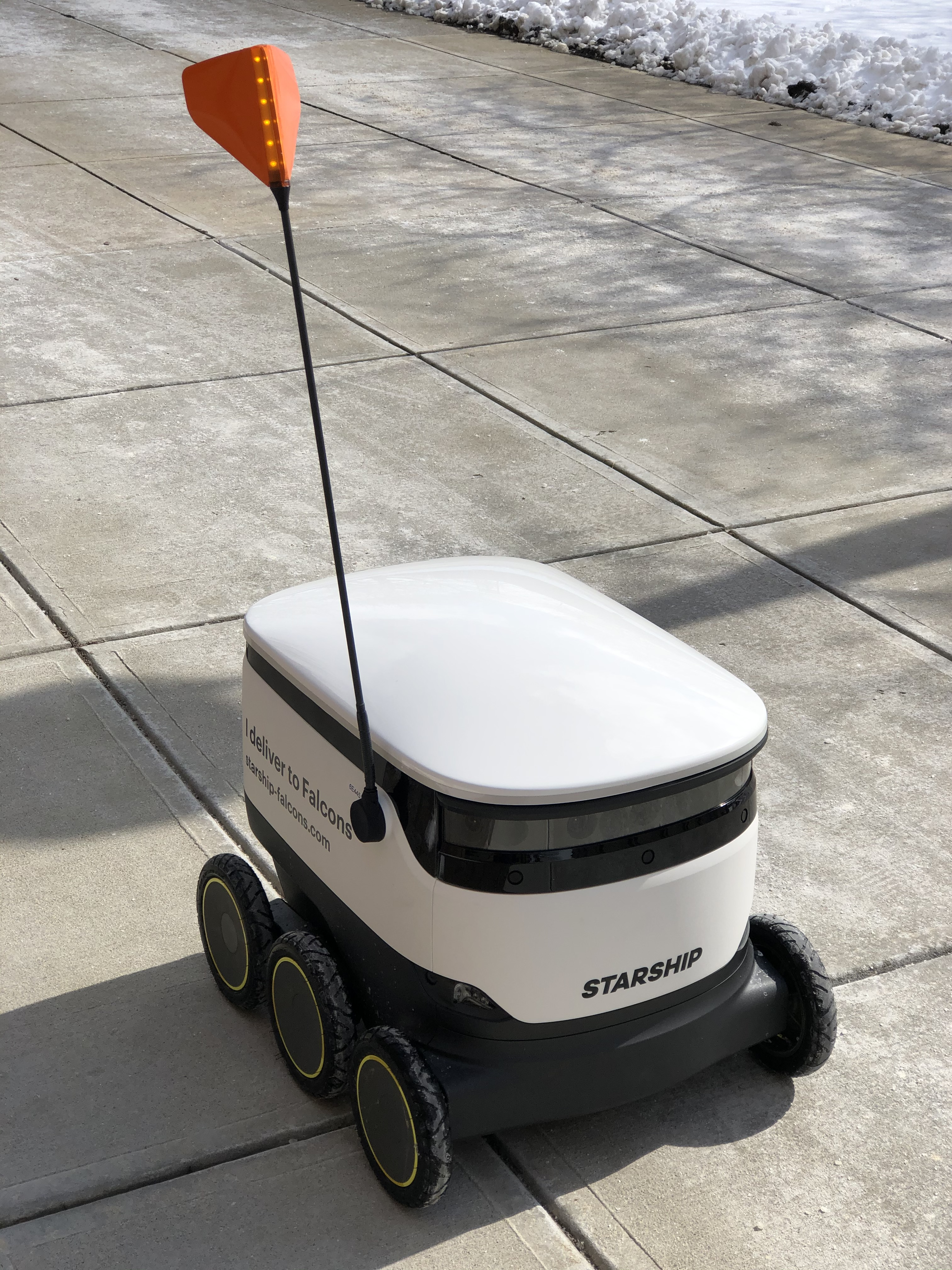
A close up of a Starship delivery robot operating in the winter, with its camera array visible

Delivery robot of Starship Technologies crossing the Suur-Ameerika street in Tallinn (Spring 2022, video)

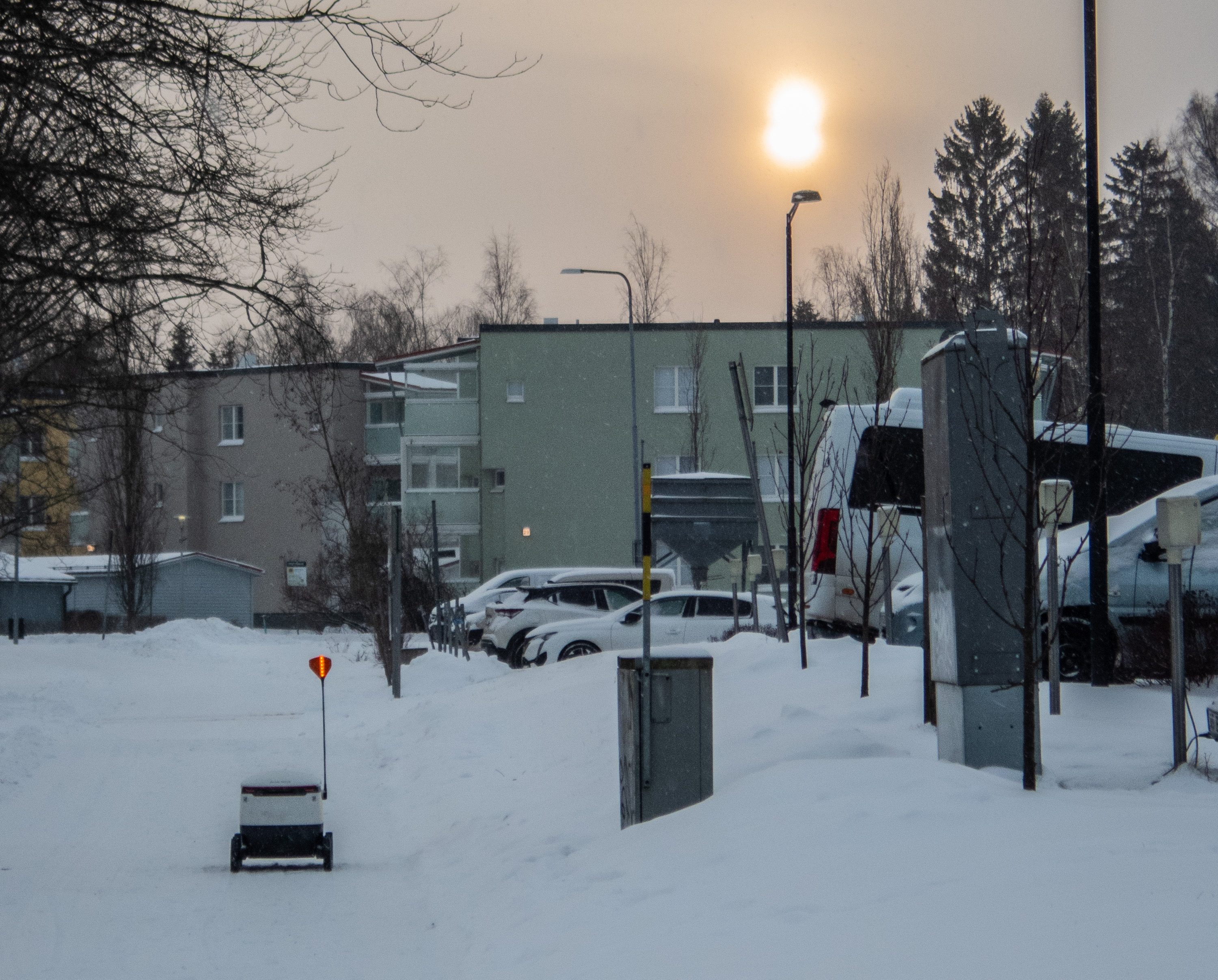
Delivery robot used by Alepa grocery chain on its way along the sidewalk in Ala-Malmi, Helsinki (Winter 2023)

== See also ==
- Delivery robot – Autonomous robot for "last mile" delivery
  - Nuro, a similar autonomous delivery vehicle, though larger at the size of a tiny car, and driving on the road.
  - Amazon Scout – Robot used to deliver Amazon packages
  - Zipline (drone delivery company) – Company that delivers medical supplies by drone
- Vehicular automation – Automation for various purposes of vehicles
  - Self-driving car – Vehicle operated with reduced or no human input on public roads
