= Avride =

Autonomous vehicles startup

Avride Inc.
- Avride self-driving robot in Jersey City, New Jersey, United States, April 2025
- Type: Private
- Industry: Vehicular automation
- Founded: December 4, 2020; 5 years ago
- Headquarters: Austin, Texas, United States
- Products: Self-driving cars Delivery robots
- Number of employees: 270
- Parent: Nebius Group
- Website: avride.ai

Avride Inc. is a developer of vehicular automation technology, including self-driving cars, robotaxis, and delivery robots. The company is headquartered in Austin, Texas and has additional offices in Tel Aviv, Israel; Belgrade, Serbia and Seoul, South Korea. It is a subsidiary of Nebius Group. Uber and Uber Eats use its self-driving cars and delivery robots in a few cities.

== History ==
Avride was formed in 2020 when Yandex and Uber completed the corporate spin-off of Yandex's self-driving car group, which began developing self-driving cars in 2017. In July 2024, Nebius Group, which owned Yandex, sold its assets in Russia, retaining Avride.

In October 2024, Avride and Uber partnered so Uber and Uber Eats could use Avride's self-driving cars and delivery robots. By the end of 2024, the robots were delivering Uber Eats orders in Austin and Dallas. In February 2025, delivery robots were launched for Uber Eats in Jersey City, New Jersey.

In March 2025, the company announced a partnership with Hyundai to develop robotaxis.

In February 2025, Avride partnered with Rakuten to start using its robot delivery bots in Tokyo, Japan. The Japanese launch started with just 10 robots and expanded its fleet over time.

In December 2025, Avride announced the launch of its robotaxi service, in partnership with Uber. The service began on December 3, 2025, and can be booked by users with the Uber app for travel within a nine-square-mile section of downtown Dallas.

== Products ==
=== Robotaxis ===
Avride's self-driving cars are retrofitted Hyundai Ioniq 5s. The vehicles are equipped with lidars, radars, cameras and other sensors, along with computational hardware and various electronic units that collect sensor and vehicle data, preprocess it, and perform diagnostics.

The company conducts on-road testing of its self-driving cars in Austin, Texas, and in the Gangnam district of Seoul, South Korea.

As of April 2026, Avride has 200 robotaxis in service.

Service areas in the United States
State	Metro area	Status	Launch date	Ref.
Texas	Austin	Testing	—	
Texas	Dallas	Safety-driver service with Uber	—	

=== Delivery robots ===
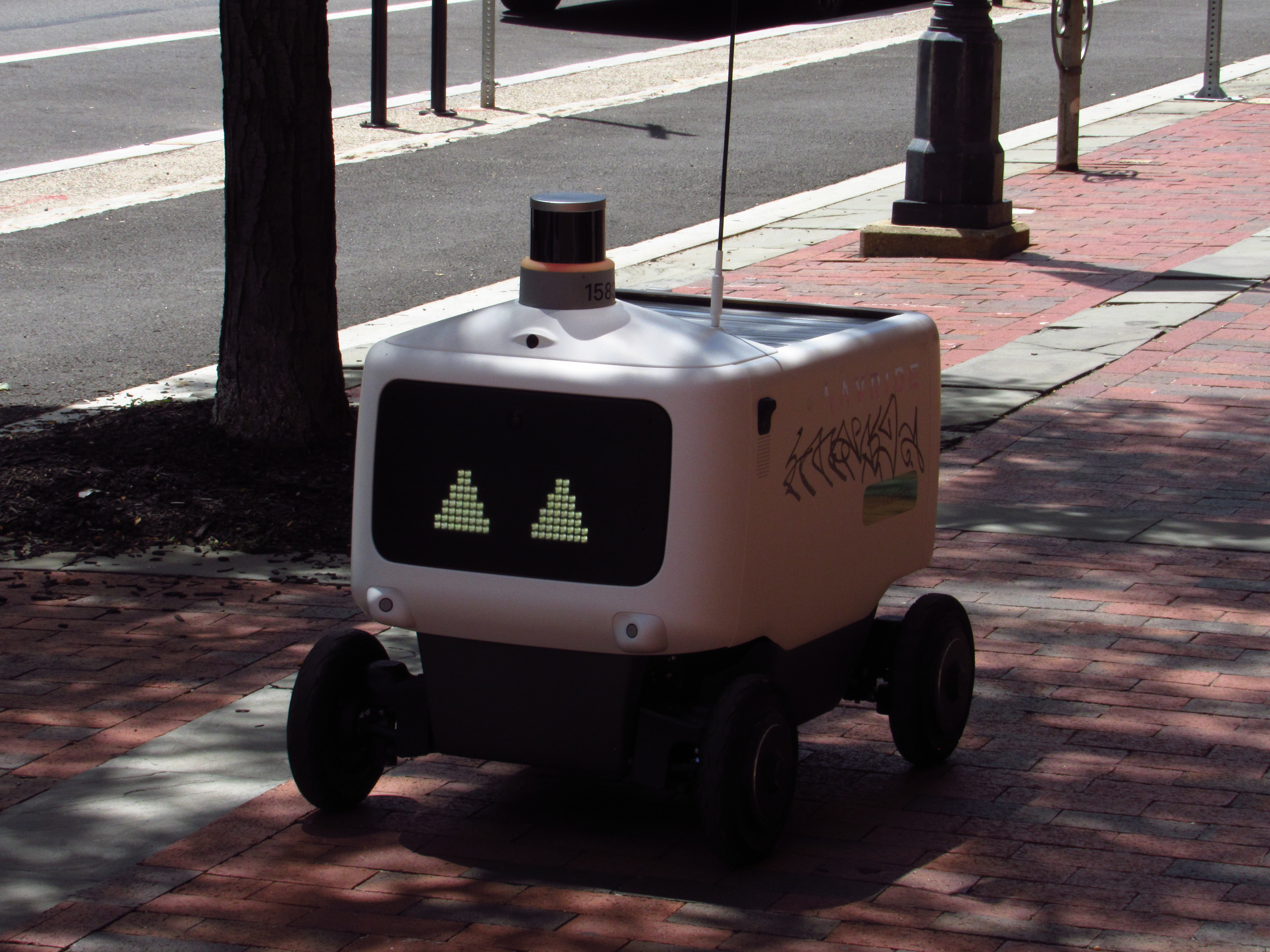
A mildly vandalized Avride delivery robot drives on the sidewalk of a street in Philadelphia, Pennsylvania, United States, July 2026

Avride operates delivery robots that deliver food from restaurants in the United States and South Korea. They navigate sidewalks at 8 km/h (5.0 mph) and can cross roads using crosswalks and traffic lights.

The company designs the robots and uses some of the software it developed for its autonomous cars. Like the company's cars, the robots are also equipped with lidars, cameras, and ultrasonic sensors. The robots are being produced in a factory in Taiwan.

== Accidents ==
As of August 17, 2026, the National Highway Traffic Safety Administration (NHTSA) has logged 80 accidents involving Avride vehicles in autonomous mode. In May 2026, the NHTSA opened a probe into Avride over safety concerns.

=== List of notable Avride accidents ===
- On March 31, 2026, an Avride car hit and killed a duck.
