= Delivery robot =

Autonomous robot for "last mile" delivery

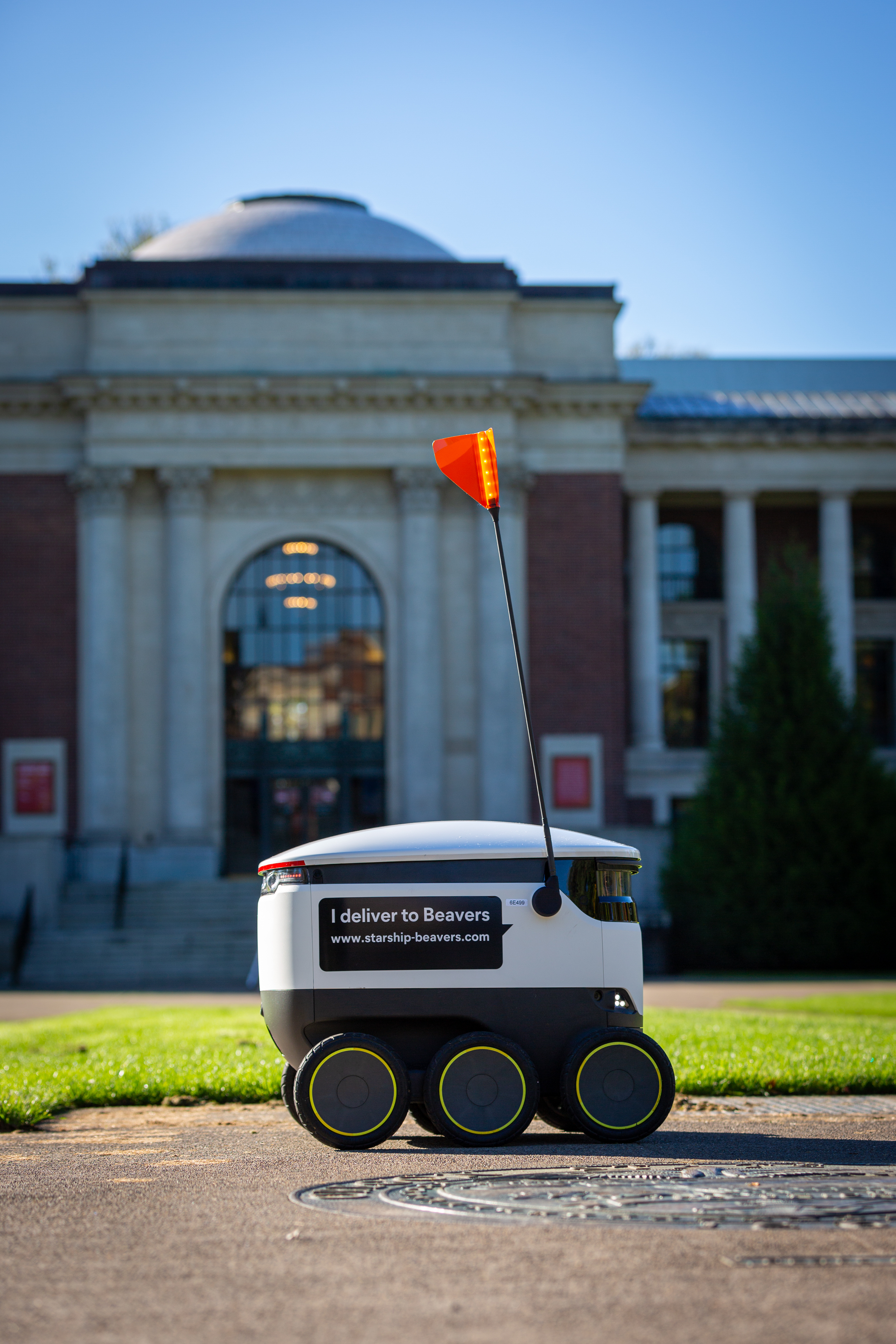
Delivery robot from Starship Technologies on a sidewalk at Oregon State University

A delivery robot is an autonomous robot that provides "last mile" delivery services. Delivery robots have been used in food delivery, package delivery, hospital delivery, and room service.

An operator may monitor and take control of the robot remotely in certain situations that the robot cannot resolve by itself, such as when it is stuck in an obstacle.

== Applications ==
=== Food delivery ===
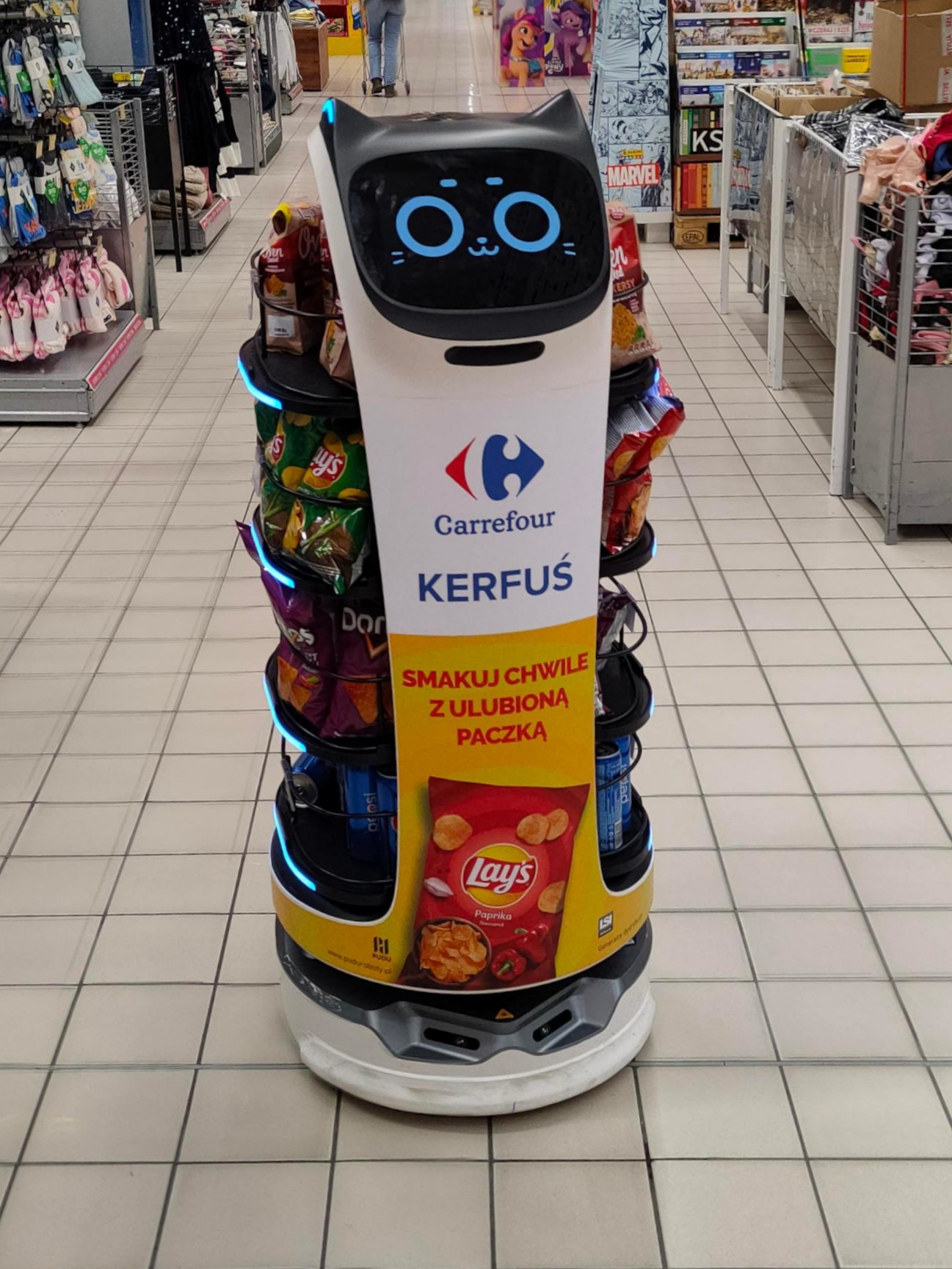
Kerfuś, a delivery robot from Poland

Deployments of food delivery robots were in a small scale prior to the COVID-19 pandemic. By January 2019, there were some deployments on United States college campuses. George Mason University became the first university campus that incorporated on-demand food deliveries by robots as part of its meal plan with 25 robots from Starship Technologies. As the pandemic continued on, demands for food deliveries had increased significantly. This caused the demands for food delivery robots in college campuses to surge as well. Starship and other companies such as Kiwibot deployed hundreds of food delivery robots to several college campuses and some city streets in the United States and United Kingdom. Food delivery service companies also added delivery robots to their platform. For example, Grubhub partnered with Yandex to provide services in colleges, while Uber Eats partnered with Serve Robotics, Coco Robotics, Motional, Cartken, and Avride for robot food delivery in various cities in the United States. Yandex Rover delivery robots have been used for delivery service Yandex Eats in a number of Russian cities since 2019. Limitations of using food delivery robots includes inability to accommodate special delivery requests such as leaving the food at the door, and inability to navigate difficult terrains. This may require remote operators to help the robots to navigate around obstacles.

=== Grocery delivery ===
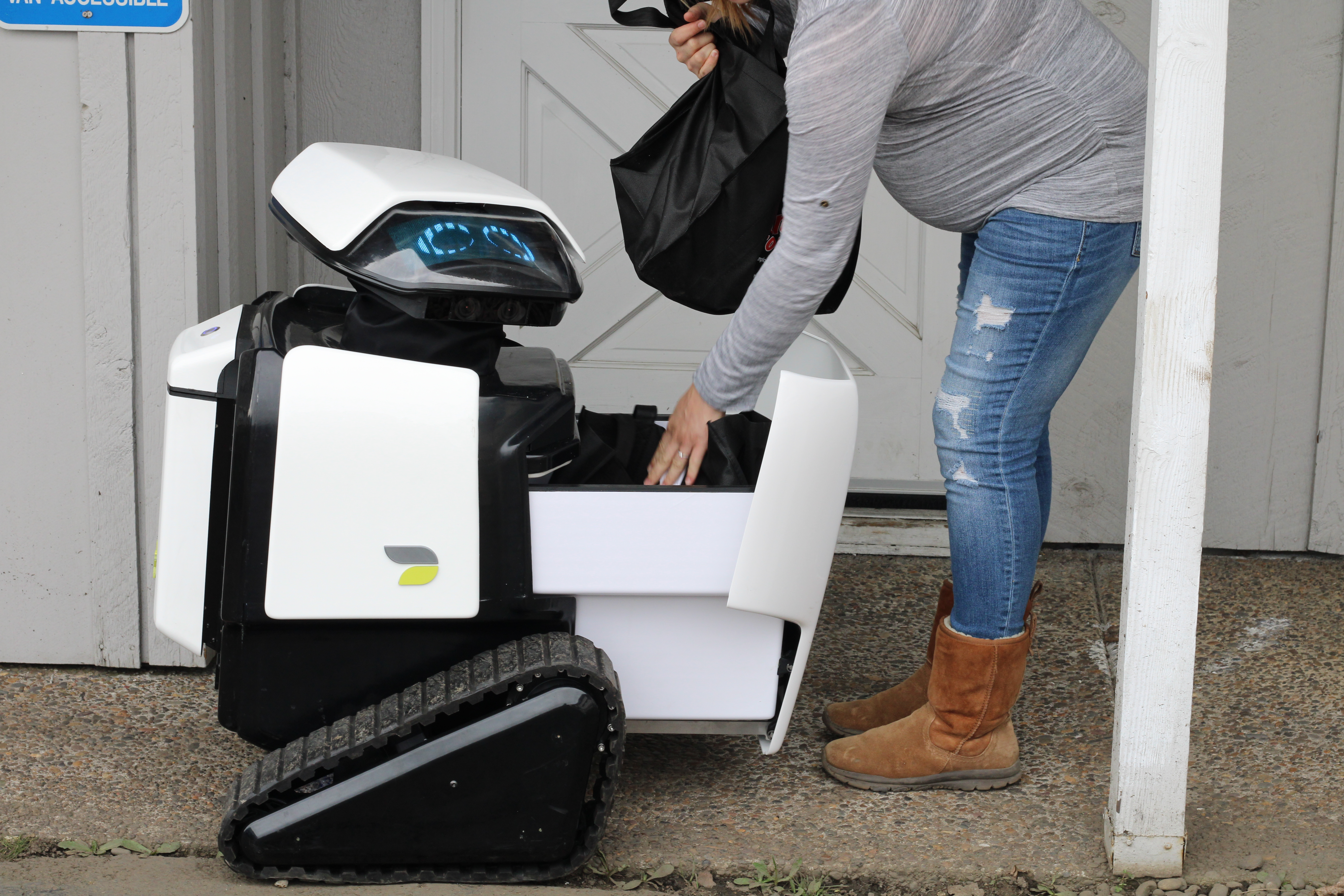
Daxbot delivering groceries

In April 2018, Starship Technologies launched its groceries delivery service in Milton Keynes, England, in partnership with supermarket chains Co-op and Tesco. By November 2020, said Starship Technologies, Milton Keynes had the "world's largest autonomous robot fleet".

Early 2022 saw the opening of Nourish + Bloom, the first African American-owned autonomous grocery store in the world. The new store processes transactions using computer vision equipment in tandem with artificial intelligence-based voice and gesture technology. Nourish + Bloom offers delivery service using robotic vehicles supplied by Daxbot. That startup, which is based in Philomath, Oregon, and raising investments through a crowdfunding campaign, has developed a unit that can travel up to 10 miles at 4 mph and has a temperature-controlled cargo space.

=== Package delivery ===
Delivery robot from Starship Technologies crossing the Suur-Ameerika street in Tallinn (Spring 2022)

In 2019, Amazon launched an experiment to deliver small packages to their Amazon Prime customers using delivery robots called Amazon Scout. The test was done in Seattle region of the United States and expanded to Irvine, California, Atlanta, and Franklin, Tennessee. In 2021, after testing of package delivery robots had been done in 4 U.S. cities, Amazon created a new development center in Finland to make further advancement in the technology in order for their robots to better handle real-life navigations. The company canceled Amazon Scout in 2023.

=== Hospital delivery ===
A hospital delivery robot rolls down the corridor at the University of Pittsburgh Medical Center

Delivery robots can perform several tasks in hospital settings to reduce operational costs. The first set of tasks are for food, medical specimens, and medicine deliveries. With multiple sensors, the delivery robots can navigate the interior layout of the hospitals. They also have an electronic signal that can request an elevator ride to be able to work in multi-story buildings. With security concerns, some delivery robots are equipped with code and a biometric fingerprint scan to prevent unauthorized access to the contents inside the robots. As of 2019 there were more than 150 hospitals in the United States and elsewhere that deployed the delivery robots. The second set of tasks is to deliver soiled linen carts and medical waste. These require heavy duty delivery robots as the weights to carry could be in several hundred pounds (several hundred kilograms).

In Israel, Sheba Medical Center uses delivery robots to shuttle chemotherapy drugs prepared by the pharmacy department directly to the nurses to cut down the waiting time.

=== Room service ===
Yolanda, a room service robot at Yotel in Singapore, navigates from lobby to guest room

In late 2014, a room service robot named Relay was introduced by a robotics startup company, Savioke. When hotel staff received an order from a guest, the staff would put items inside Relay and the robot would deliver items to the guest room. By 2016, fleets of Relay robots were deployed at five major hotel chains. In August 2017, M Social hotel in Singapore introduced room service robots named AURA to assist staff in tasks such as delivering bottled water and towels to guest rooms. It was the first such service outside of the United States.

=== Other applications ===
Delivery robots have also been deployed inside airport terminals. In December 2021, Cincinnati/Northern Kentucky International Airport launched the first delivery robots that deliver food and retail orders to passengers, after a pilot that began in 2020.

Robots have been used for infrastructure inspections, such as evaluating sidewalk disruptions and the slope of access ramps.

== Companies ==
=== Sidewalk robots ===
A number of companies are actively using small robots to do the last-mile delivery of small packages such as food and groceries just using the pedestrian areas of the road and traveling at speed comparable with a fast walking pace. Companies actively delivering include:

- Starship Technologies: by June 2023 had completed over 5 million commercial autonomous deliveries with their fleet of 2,000 autonomous robots.
- Amazon Scout: Amazon has terminated its sidewalk robot pilot.

=== Drones ===
- Zipline: fixed-wing UAVs delivering medicine and blood supplies via parachute drops; by June 2022 they had made 325,000 deliveries.

== Human interaction ==
Being autonomous, the delivery robots primarily interact with the general public without the assistance of a human operator, in both positive and negative encounters. The delivery robot manufacturer Starship Technologies has reported that people kick their robots. However, the vast majority of human interactions are positive, and many people have anthropomorphized the robots due to their appearance. This has led to encounters where people feel a sense of caring towards the robots, assisting the robots when they are stuck, worrying for the robots on their journeys, or praising or thanking robots for their delivery service.

In the 2022 monograph Road to Nowhere, technology journalist Paris Marx criticizes the deployment of delivery robots on sidewalks, relating instances of robots causing problems for disabled people and noting more widespread opposition from pedestrian and transportation advocates. The deployment of hundreds of sidewalk delivery robots in Los Angeles engendered such opposition from the public in the mid-2020s. Chicago's 1st ward, covering portions of the Wicker Park and Logan Square neighborhoods, banned the use of sidewalk delivery robots in 2026 after a survey distributed by the ward's alderman returned more than 80% opposition from responding residents.

A woman in Philadelphia was arrested in 2026 for intentionally blocking a food delivery robot, which she said she did to protest job loss from automation, the commandeering of public sidewalk space for private business, and surveillance by the robots' cameras. Philadelphia is subject to a state law that legally classifies sidewalk delivery robots as pedestrians.
