= Cat Daddies =

- Official poster.
- Directed by: Mye Hoang
- Written by: Mye Hoang
- Produced by: Mye Hoang; Dave Boyle
- Starring: David Durst; David Giovanni; Nathan Kehn; Jordan Lide; Peter Mares; Ryan Robertson; Ridoanul Haque Siyam; Will Zweigart
- Cinematography: Rob E. Bennett
- Edited by: Mye Hoang
- Music by: Micah Dahl Anderson
- Production company: Gray Hat Productions
- Distributed by: Gray Hat Productions (United States); Motion Picture Exchange (internationally)
- Release dates: February 5, 2022 (San Francisco Independent Film Festival); October 14, 2022 (United States)
- Running time: 89 minutes
- Country: United States
- Language: English
- Box office: 112,332 United States dollars

Cat Daddies is a 2022 American documentary film directed and written by Mye Hoang, and produced by him together with Dave Boyle. Created by the studio Gray Hat Productions, it premiered on February 5, 2022 at the San Francisco Independent Film Festival, and later had a theatric release on October 14 in the United States. The film follows nine men and their cats, living across several different cities in the United States, living though the first weeks of the 2020 COVID-19 pandemic. It has a run time of 89 minutes.

== Premise ==
A portrait of nine men across the several different cities in the United States, whose lives have been changed by their cats. They include an actor and influencer, an advertising professional and cat rescuer, a firefighter, a police officer, a schoolteacher, a software engineer, a stunt performer, a truck driver, and a homeless and undocumented immigrant suffering from cancer and cerebral palsy. They navigate the first weeks of the 2020 COVID-19 pandemic, with the help of, and while taking care of their cats.

== Cast ==
- David Durst
- David Giovanni
- Nathan Kehn
- Jordan Lide
- Peter Mares
- Ryan Robertson
- Ridoanul Haque Siyam
- Will Zweigart

== Production and release ==
The film was directedand written by Mye Hoang, and produced by him together with Dave Boyle and Nobu Nagatsuma. The cinematography was done by Rob E. Bennett, and music by Micah Dahl Anderson, while Ryan Bury, James Andrew Felts, Nobu Nagatsuma, and Emily Ting were executive producers. Its cast included David Durst, David Giovanni, Nathan Kehn, Jordan Lide, Peter Mares, Ryan Robertson, Ridoanul Haque Siyam, and Will Zweigart. It was produced by Gray Hat Productions, a film company based in Los Angeles, California, which also distributed it in the United States. The film premiered on September 5, 2022 at the San Francisco Independent Film Festival, and later had a theatric release on October 14 in the United States. It was distributed internationally by Motion Picture Exchange. The film has a run time of 89 minutes. It recorded a gross domestic box office of 112,332 United States dollars.

In Poland, the film was promoted in a partnership with the store chain Carrefour, with the use of its mascot, a feline-like autonomous delivery robot named Kerfuś.

== Reception ==
=== Critical response ===
On the review aggregator website Rotten Tomatoes, 85% of 20 critics' reviews are positive, with an average rating of 7.5/10.

=== Awards and nominations ===
Award	Year	Category	Recipient(s)	Result	Ref.
Animalis Fabula Film Festival	2022	Outstanding Achievement Award for the Best Documentary	Cat Daddies, Mye Hoang	Won	
Animalis Fabula Film Festival	2022	Best of Show	Cat Daddies, Mye Hoang	Nominated	
Cleveland International Film Festival	2022	Ad Hoc Docs Competition	Cat Daddies, Mye Hoang	Nominated	
Dallas International Film Festival	2022	Audience Award	Cat Daddies, Mye Hoang	Won	
Frozen River Film Festival	2022	People's Choice Award	Cat Daddies, Mye Hoang	Won	
Frozen River Film Festival	2022	Special Jury Award	Cat Daddies	Won	
Newport Beach Film Festival	2022	Outstanding Achievement in Documentary	Cat Daddies	Won	
San Francisco Independent Film Festival	2022	Audience Award for Best Documentary Feature	Cat Daddies	Won	
Tallgrass International Film Festival	2022	Excellence in the Art of Filmmaking Award	Cat Daddies, Mye Hoang	Won	
