= Daxbot =

American robotics company

Coordinates: 44.5436°N 123.3592°W

- Type: Private
- Industry: Robotics
- Founder: Joseph Sullivan
- Headquarters: Philomath, Oregon, United States
- Products: Service robots for sidewalk accessibility assessment; security robots for patrol
- Website: www.daxbot.com

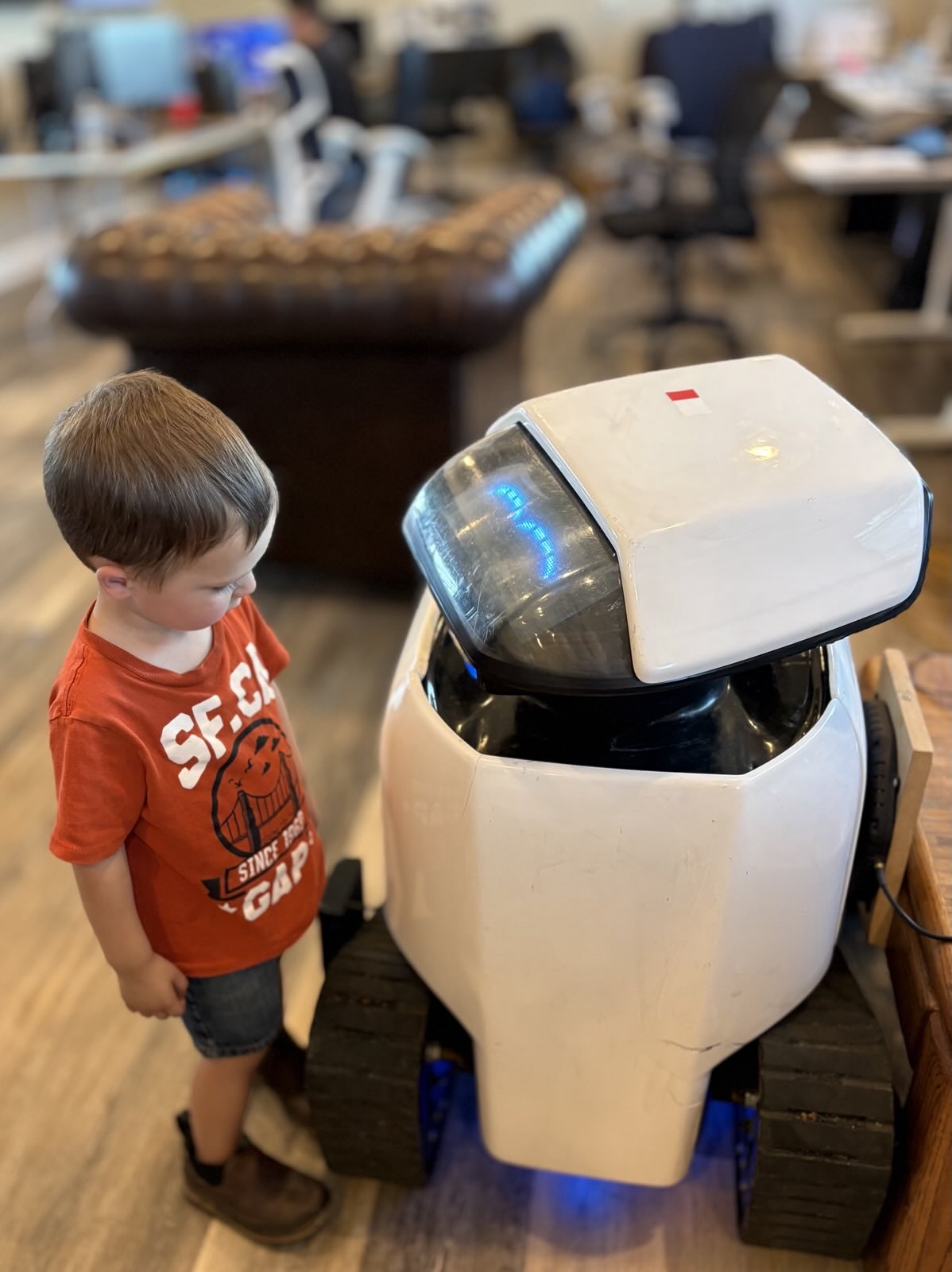
Daxbot service robot, 2025

Daxbot is an American robotics company based in Philomath, Oregon. The company develops autonomous robots for deliveries, ADA sidewalk accessibility assessments, and private security patrols. Joseph Sullivan is the founder and owner.

== History ==
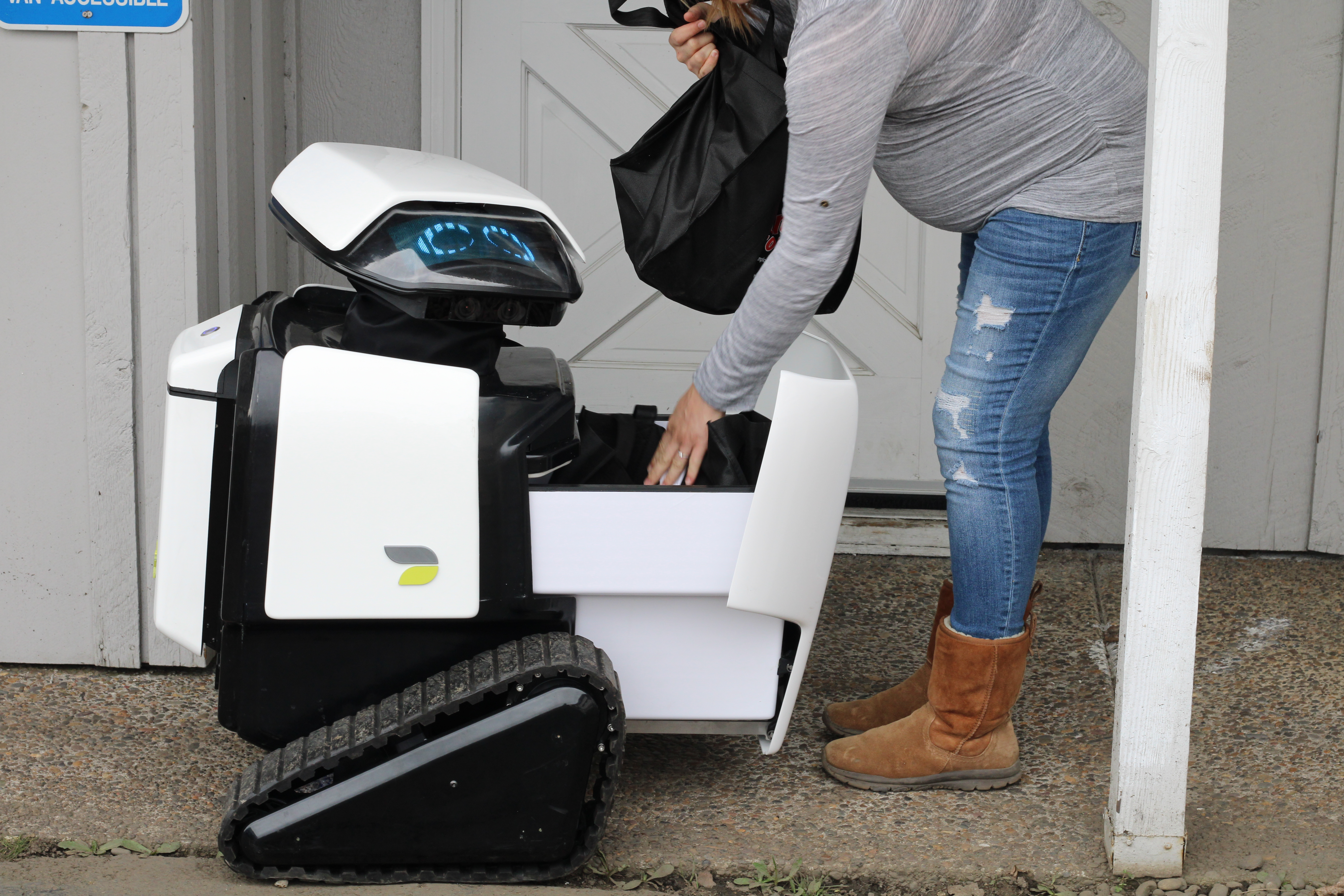
Daxbot executing a delivery, 2022

The company was founded in 2015. It was originally called Nova Dynamics and is based in Philomath, Oregon, where in 2017 the city approved testing of its delivery robot. In 2025, the City of Irvine announced the use of Daxbot robots to survey sidewalks and curb ramps as part of the city's ADA Title II self-evaluation; the project was led by city contractor Bureau Veritas. In September 2025, CTX Patrol partnered with Daxbot to deploy security robots for site patrol in areas around Northeast Austin.

In November 2025 the Salem Center Mall in Salem, Oregon started using Daxbot as a security patrol, and it was also announced that Daxbot would soon begin working to cut down vandalism and drifting at Pringle Parkade.

In January 2026, the city of Burleson, Texas deployed Daxbots to help them identify areas of Burleston that were in need of accessibility improvements. Compliance robots have also been employed in Tyler, Texas. The robots have been well received.

== Technology ==
Daxbot's delivery robots can travel up to 10 miles at 4 mph and have a temperature-controlled cargo space. The robots' nonverbal sounds have been shown to positively impact people's perceptions of them.

Their ADA robots collect measurements related to accessibility, such as slopes, widths, and curb-ramp attributes, to support ADA self-evaluations and transition planning.

The company's security robots are used by private security firms for mobile video monitoring and site patrols.

== See also ==
- Service robot
