= Veriff =

Estonian identity verification service

veriff
- Website type: Private company
- Available in: Multilingual
- Founded: 2015
- Headquarters: Tallinn, Estonia
- Area served: Global
- Founders: Kaarel Kotkas, Janer Gorohhov
- Key people: Kaarel Kotkas (CEO); Janer Gorohhov (COO)
- Services: identity verification service
- Employees: 248 (2021)
- Website: veriff.com
- Registration: Yes
- Current status: Active

Veriff is a global identity verification service company founded and headquartered in Tallinn, Estonia. The company offers services for online businesses to mitigate fraud attempts and assisting regulatory compliance. Offering protection from identity fraud and identity theft, Veriff verifies a customer's identity automatically, using an AI that analyzes a multitude of technological and behavioural indicators, including facial recognition. The service is provided to companies as an API, which has been compared to Stripe.

== History ==
Veriff was created by Kaarel Kotkas who, while living on Hiiumaa, the second-largest island of Estonia, had experienced difficulties with identification-based transactions. As he helped run his family farm, he tried to buy supplies online and encountered difficulties setting up a PayPal account – he was rejected as he was a minor. Without thinking twice at the time, he tampered with the photo of his government issued ID card and changed the year of his birth from 1994 to 1984. His PayPal account was activated, but the thought of how easy it was to trick the system was unsettling for Kotkas. And so, he was set on the path of developing a better and more secure ID verification process. After a short spell of working on the verification operations at Wise, Kotkas founded Veriff in 2015 as a startup that would combine different methods of distanced verification to provide a more reliable online service.

In Estonia, the service launched in June 2016 and by September 2016, the company employed 12 people. For a year, Veriff worked with the Ministry of Finance, Ministry of the Interior, the Estonian Data Protection Inspectorate, and Estonian e-residency program, to create procedures for using the national registries that would preserve the integrity of personal data. Among its first clients was Estonia's largest online retailer Hansapost.

The company started by offering verification services to the banking sector. After the initial investor, Estonian bank Inbank (formerly Cofi) from 2016, another Estonian bank LHV started offering bank account opening via video link only, without any physical visits, in 2017. Financial regulations in Estonia didn't allow opening accounts for enterprises or making transfers over 10,000 euros without physical identification. The possibility of distanced identification for banks became legally available in Estonia in June 2016.

In June 2018, Veriff graduated from American seed accelerator Y-Combinator. At the end of 2018, Estonian venture capitalists named Veriff the startup of the year.

In January 2019, Veriff acquired Estonian network intelligence company BrowserID. BrowserID was working on the collection and analysis of device-based data for fraud monitoring purposes. Primarily interested in Browser ID’s device-based data capabilities, the acquisition expanded Veriff’s fraud prevention benchmark beyond facial recognition and document verification.

In June 2019, Veriff signed an agreement with Berlin's public transportation company Berliner Verkehrsbetriebe (BVG). BVG uses Veriff's service to identify the users of its mobility app Jelbi, covering Berlin's entire public transportation system from scooters and bikes to car-sharing and traditional taxis.

Veriff's agreement with Blockchain.com was announced in August 2019. Blockchain had started testing the verification service at the beginning of the year. Formerly focusing on big companies, Veriff came out with subscription-based services for small and medium businesses in September 2019. By June 2021, Veriff was also working with companies like Bolt, Opera, Mintos, Turo, Grow Mobility, Verify 365 and Wise.

In November 2019, Veriff opened its first foreign office in New York City. By that time, Veriff employed over 300 people in its Tallinn office and had raised 7.35 million euros in investments.

In March 2020, Kotkas was chosen the EY Estonian entrepreneur of the year. In the same month, the company stated that despite Brexit it was establishing customer-facing teams and account management in London. In the beginning of May, though, Veriff announced it would lay off 63 employees because the COVID-19 pandemic had increased the business volume in Europe and the U.S. where the company offered fully automatic services, while diminishing the need for online verification in countries where more human oversight had been necessary. In June, Veriff raised additional 13.8 million euros from investors. By that time, their number of employees had fallen to 230.

In 2022, Veriff raised $100 million in funding from investors, raising the company's value to $1.3 billion. With this, Veriff was classified as a unicorn.

== Verification process ==
The system cross-refers images of the customer taken by a local device with the identity information held in government databases comparing ratios between points on a person's face. Veriff next combines the results of face comparison and document validation with video analysis, device and network fingerprinting, and registry checks, providing real-time results. The combination of checks depends on the particular service's needs and risk appetite, as well as local laws and regulations - e.g., Estonia's regulations require a video interview with anyone wanting to open a bank account. In addition to analyzing the data acquired within a particular video session to ensure that the session is voluntary and not pre-recorded, Veriff crosslinks the data with other sessions to detect systematic fraud, complemented by PEP and sanctions checks.

If necessary, a manual verification by humans can be added to the automatic service. Different methods are used for different risk profiles while protecting personal and sensitive data. Verification flows are offered across platforms, having software development kits (SDKs) on the web as well as for Android and iOS.

In October 2019, Veriff released a near-field communication (NFC) verification tool to validate biometric documents. If a device has an integrated reader, the cross-platform tool reads data directly from the chip, detecting fraud attempts.

In March 2020, Veriff launched a new Assisted Image Capture (AIC) service as a separate solution. AIC gives customers real-time feedback to avoid the most common mistakes during the identification process, like blurriness, glare, facial occlusion or damaged ID documents.

== Investors ==
Veriff's initial investor was Estonian bank Inbank (formerly Cofi) in 2016 via its subsidiaries Inbank Technologies and investment company Mobi Solutions, headed by Linnar Viik. Veriff investors include Y Combinator, Mosaic Ventures, Nordic Ninja, Accel, IVP and others. Veriff has raised $92.8 million in funding to date since its founding. The company announced a $69 million series B round in 2021 led by investment firms IVP and Accel. Before this, the company accepted bridge-funding of €13,8 million, and raised a $7.7 million Series A round in 2018, the leading investor being Mosaic Ventures. Also in 2018, Veriff Inc., registered in the U.S., became the sole proprietor of the Estonian company Veriff OÜ. In Estonian state registry, the transfer was formalized on October 22, 2019. Veriff has been tipped to become Estonia’s 6th unicorn company by Digital Europe. In January 2022, Veriff closed a $100 million Series C funding round co-led by Tiger Global and Alkeon Capital.

== Data Breach ==
In late 2025, a data breach involving identity verification provider Veriff exposed the personal information of customers of Total Wireless. According to notifications issued by Total Wireless, an unauthorized party gained access to data stored within Veriff’s systems, not Total Wireless’s own network. The compromised information included images of government-issued identification documents submitted during customer verification processes, along with associated personal details such as names, mailing addresses, and dates of birth.

Investigations revealed that approximately 8,583 Total Wireless customers in the United States were affected by the incident. Class-action lawsuits have been filed, alleging that Veriff and Total Wireless failed to adequately safeguard personally identifiable information and exposed customers to increased risks of identity theft and fraud.
