= Postmates =

American delivery company

Postmates Inc.
- Type: Subsidiary
- Industry: Logistics
- Founded: May 1, 2011; 15 years ago
- Founder: Bastian Lehmann; Sam Street; Sean Plaice
- Headquarters: San Francisco, California, United States
- Area served: Select cities in United States
- Key people: Bastian Lehman (CEO); Sean Plaice, Kristin Schaefer (Management Team); Nabeel Hyatt, Brian Singerman, Khai Ha (Board Members)
- Products: Mobile app, website
- Services: Delivery (commerce)
- Revenue: US$1 billion (2018)
- Number of employees: 5,341 (2019)
- Parent: Uber
- Website: postmates.com

Postmates Inc. is an American food delivery service, founded in 2011, and acquired by Uber in 2020. It offers local delivery of restaurant-prepared meals and other goods. It is headquartered in San Francisco, California.

As of February 2019, Postmates operates in 2,940 U.S. cities. Postmates primarily competes with Grubhub, DoorDash, and its sister service Uber Eats.

The company has been sued for alleged antitrust price manipulation.

== History ==
Postmates was founded in 2011 by Bastian Lehmann, Sean Plaice, and Sam Street.

In December 2014, Postmates opened its application programming interface to merchants to allow small businesses to compete in the business of consumer goods delivery with larger companies such as Amazon.

In November 2017, Postmates launched its service in Mexico City, its first location outside the United States. It ceased operations in Mexico in December 2019, citing a lack of growth and a desire to focus more on the U.S. market. In 2018, Postmates launched its service in 134 new cities in the United States, bringing its total number of cities in the United States up to 550.

On December 13, 2018, Postmates announced the development of an autonomous delivery rover.

=== Funding and acquisition ===
In 2011, Postmates raised over US$800,000 through involvement with the Angelpad accelerator.

In September 2018, Postmates announced that it had raised US$300 million in additional funding, led by Tiger Global Management. Fortune reported that the deal valued Postmates at US$1.2 billion.

In January 2019, Postmates raised US$100 million in investments from BlackRock together with Spark Capital, Founders Fund, Uncork Capital, and Slow Ventures. The total valuation of the company reached US$1.85 billion.

In September 2019, GPI Capital led a final round capital raise in Postmates with its Managing Partner, Khai Ha, joining the board.

In December 2020, Uber acquired Postmates for US$2.65 billion.

== Criticism ==
=== Pay structure ===
In May 2019, Postmates changed its pay structure for delivery workers, removing a $4-per-job minimum pay guarantee, changing the base rate per job, and decreasing the per-mile rate in some markets. Working Washington, a labor activism group affiliated with the SEIU labor union, urged couriers to refuse jobs with Postmates. The company defended its modified pay structure, citing improved efficiency and its policy of allowing workers to keep all tips without counting them against other compensation.

=== Allegations of monopolistic behavior ===
In April 2020, a group of New York residents sued DoorDash, GrubHub, Postmates, and Uber Eats, accusing them of abusing their market power by only listing restaurants on their apps if the restaurant owners signed contracts which include clauses that require prices to be the same for dine-in customers as for customers receiving delivery. The plaintiffs stated that this arrangement increases the cost for dine-in customers, as they are required to subsidize the cost of delivery; and that the apps charge “exorbitant” fees, which range from 13% to 40% of revenue, while the average restaurant’s profit ranges from 3% to 9% of revenue. The lawsuit seeks triple damages, including for overcharges, since April 14, 2016, for dine-in and delivery customers in the United States at restaurants using the defendants’ delivery apps. The case is filed in the federal U.S. District Court, Southern District of New York as Davitashvili v GrubHub Inc., 20-cv-3000. A trial date has not yet been set. In March 2022, U. S. District Judge Lewis A. Kaplan denied the defendants' motion to dismiss.

== See also ==
- Delivery Hero
- OrderUp
