= Kerfuś =

Robot mascot of Carrefour in Poland

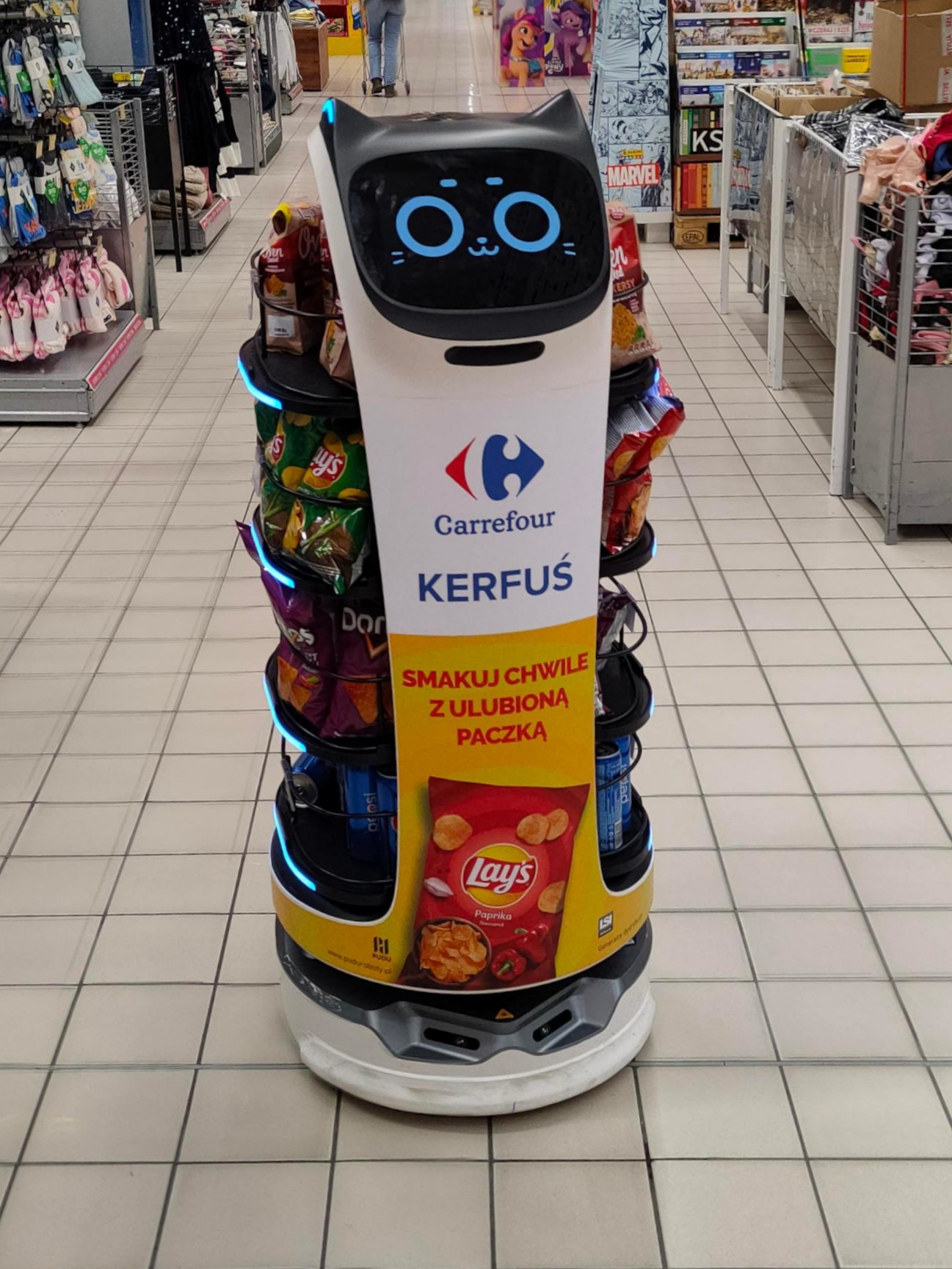
- Kerfuś robot in the Carrefour store in Warsaw, Poland, in 2022.
- First appearance: 2022
- Voiced by: Hanna Rudzka-Jętczak

In-universe information
- Full name: Kerfuś
- Occupation: Carrefour retail clerk

Kerfuś (Polish: [ˈkɛr.fuɕ]) is a mascot of the Carrefour store chain in Poland, in the form of an autonomous delivery robot distributing snacks, with the face of a cartoon cat. The mascot was introduced in stores in Warsaw, Poland, in 2022, as an advertisement campaign in the collaboration between Carrefour and PepsiCo. Since then, it has become a viral phenomenon and an internet meme.

== Character description ==
Kerfuś is a BellaBot autonomous delivery robot manufactured by Chinese company Pudu Robotics, and distributed in Poland by LSI Software. It is used by the Carrefour store chain, to distribute snacks to customers in its stores, as part of its marketing campaign. It has a display that depicts a face of a cartoon cat, and can interact and talk with the customers. It is voiced by Hanna Rudzka-Jętczak.

== History ==
Kerfuś was introduced in September 2022 by Carrefour in its two stores in the Galeria Wileńska and Westfield Arkadia shopping centres in Warsaw, Poland, as part of its marketing campaign. The campaign itself was a collaboration between Carrefour and PepsiCo, as part of which the robot distributed products of the latter to the customers, including soda drinks and bags of crisps.

As part of the collaboration with PepsiCo, the robot was present in the stores in Warsaw until the end of 2022. It remains unknown if the collaboration will be extended, however Carrefour representatives stated that the company is interested in continuing the presence of Kerfuś in its store.

With the huge popularity of the robot, Carrefour organized a tour across Poland, with robots appearing in its stores in various cities. Those cities were: Bolesławiec, Bełchatów, Ciechanów, Dębica, Gdańsk, Gorzów Wielkopolski, Piła, Inowrocław, Kalisz, Krosno, Łódź, Mińsk Mazowiecki, Olsztyn, Ostrowiec Świętokrzyski, Poznań, Puławy, Tarnów, Toruń, Pabianice and Wrocław. The company also released a limited series of clothing with Kerfuś, available at its stores.

In December 2022, Carrefour, as part of the promotion of the movie Cat Daddies, used Kerfuś for a charity action, collecting in its stores food donations and other things to help animals. Kerfuś had been used as a brand ambassador of the charity and the movie. The promotion took place in the eight stores, in the cities of Gdańsk, Inowrocław, Ostrowiec Świętokrzyski, Puławy, Toruń, Warsaw, and Wrocław.

The robot had gained a huge amount of popularity, and became a viral phenomenon in the internet, being featured in various memes.
