= Uber Eats =

American multinational food delivery service

- Formerly: UberFRESH (2014–2015)
- Type: Subsidiary
- Industry: Online food ordering
- Founded: August 26, 2014; 12 years ago
- Founders: Travis Kalanick; Garrett Camp
- Headquarters: San Francisco, California, United States
- Areas served: Argentina, Australia, Belgium, Canada, Chile, Costa Rica, Denmark, Dominican Republic, Ecuador, El Salvador, Finland, France, Germany, Guatemala, Ireland, Italy, Japan, Kenya, Luxembourg, Mexico, Netherlands, New Zealand, Panama, Poland, Portugal, South Africa, Spain, Sri Lanka, Sweden, Switzerland, Taiwan, Turkiye, United Kingdom, United States
- Key people: Dara Khosrowshahi (CEO)
- Services: Food delivery
- Revenue: ▲US$13.7 billion (2025)
- Operating income: ▲US$2.4 billion (2025)
- Parent: Uber
- Website: ubereats.com

Uber Eats is an American online food ordering and delivery platform launched by the ride-hailing company Uber in August 2014. It is one of the largest global food delivery services, competing with companies such as DoorDash, Grubhub, Deliveroo and Just Eat Takeaway.

In December 2020, Uber acquired the U.S.-based food delivery service Postmates for $2.65 billion, integrating its operations into the Uber Eats platform. However, Postmates continues to operate as an independent brand, with a particularly strong presence in the Western United States.

Uber Eats has faced criticism over issues such as worker classification, pricing practices, including hidden fees, misleading subscription benefits and potential antitrust violations.

== History ==
Uber Eats availability by country Current locations Former locations

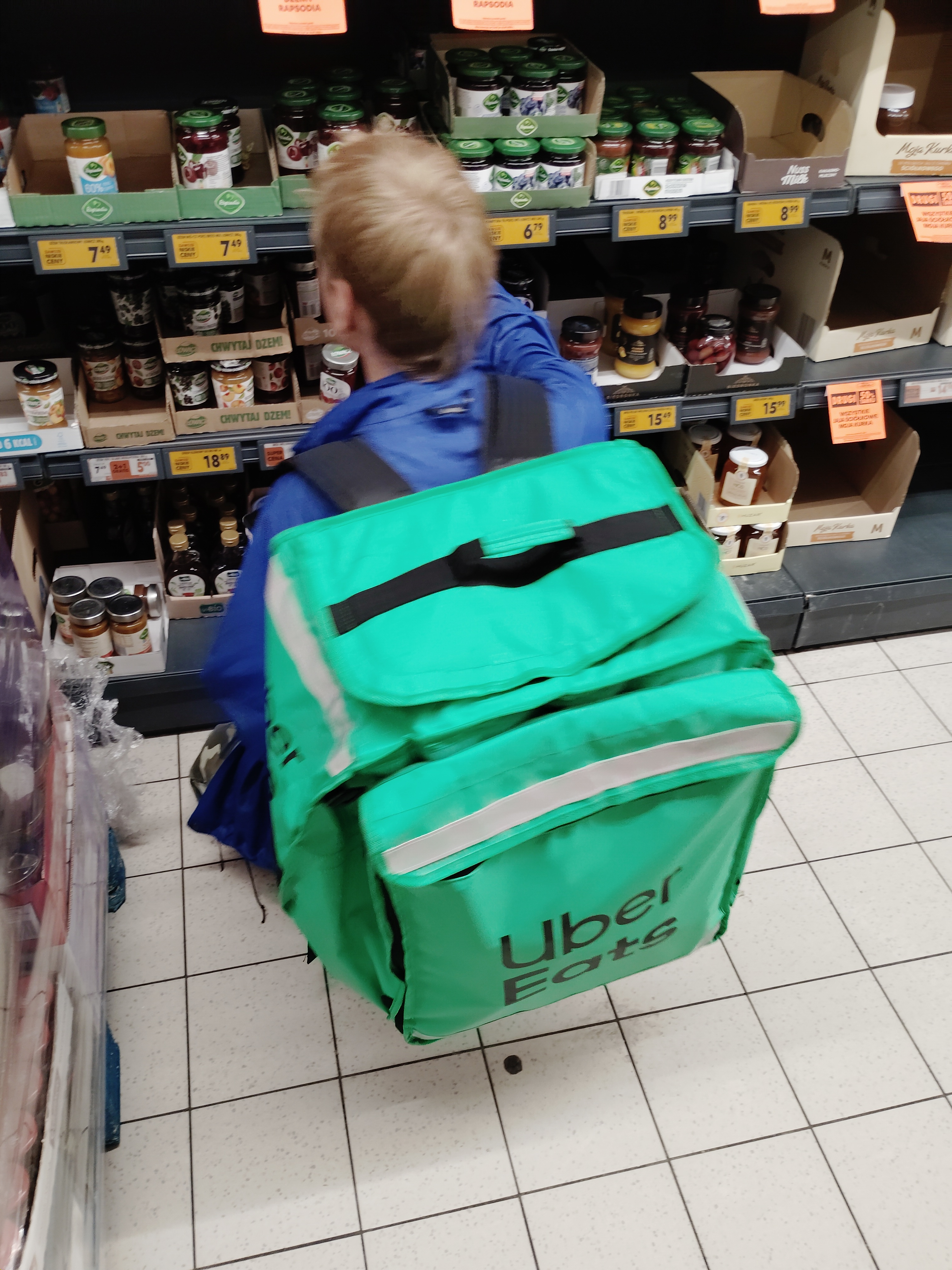
Bicycle messenger during selecting products from an order, Tomaszów Mazowiecki, Poland

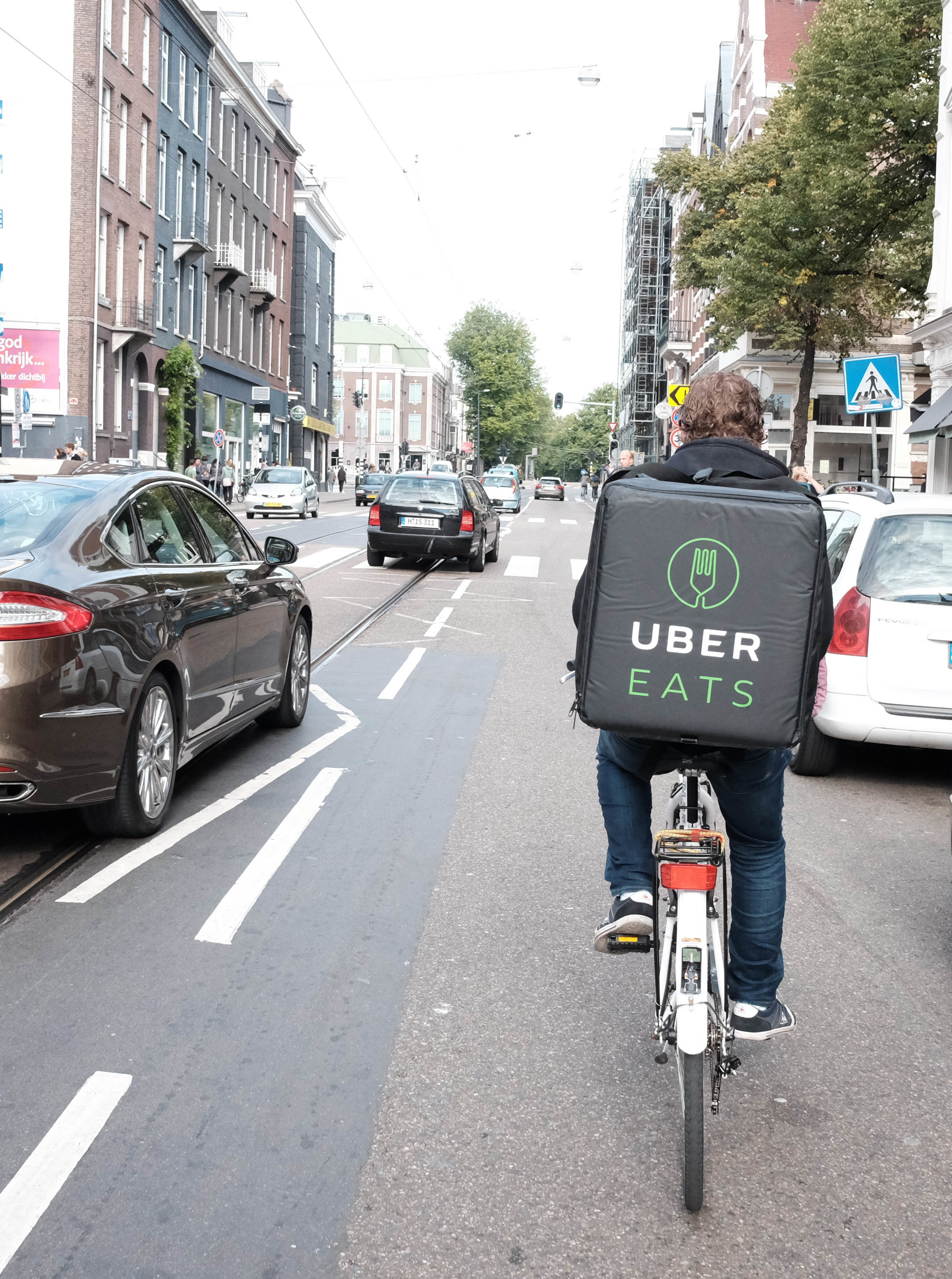
Uber Eats messenger in Amsterdam, Netherlands

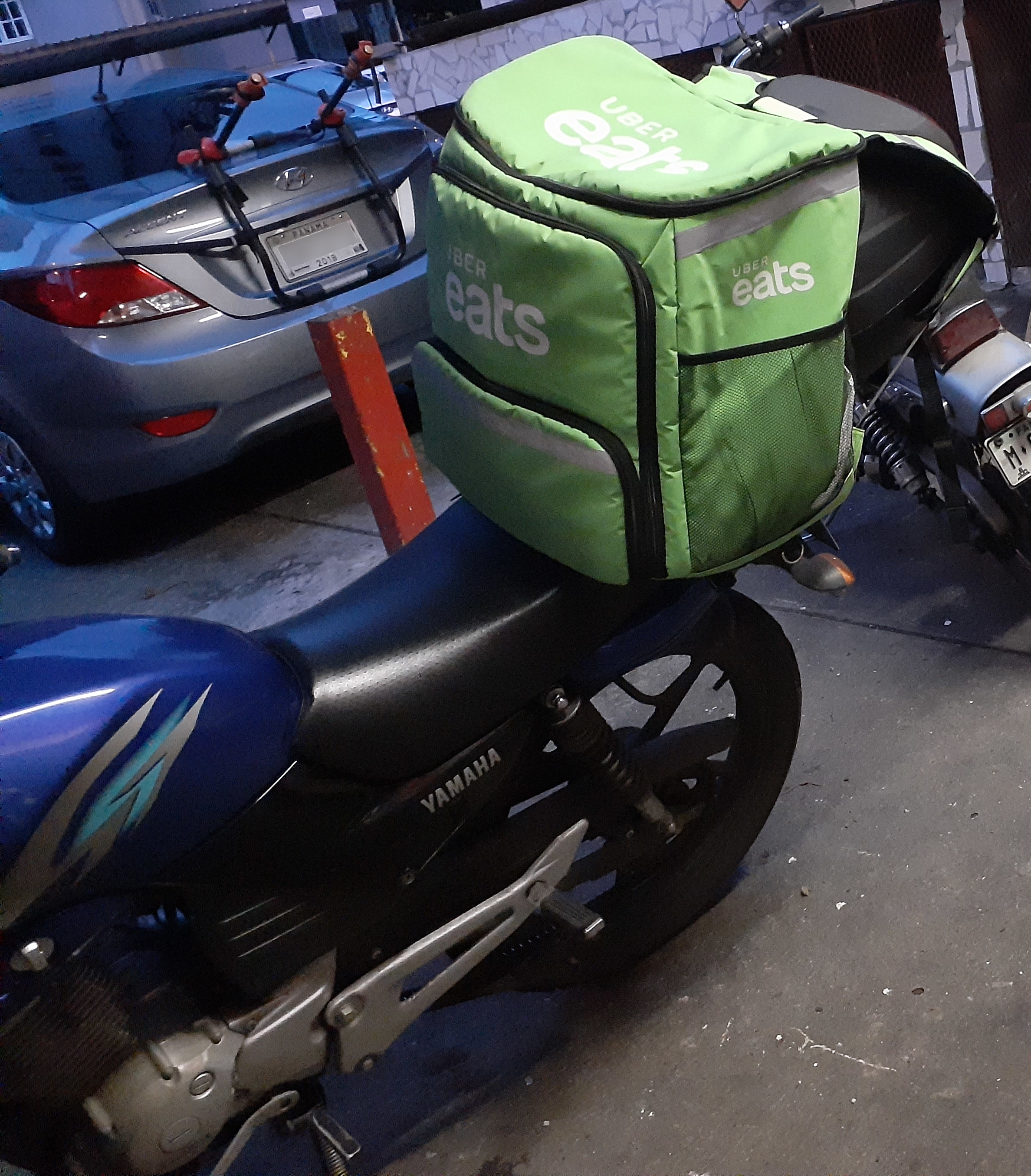
An Uber Eats Motorcycle messenger in Panama City

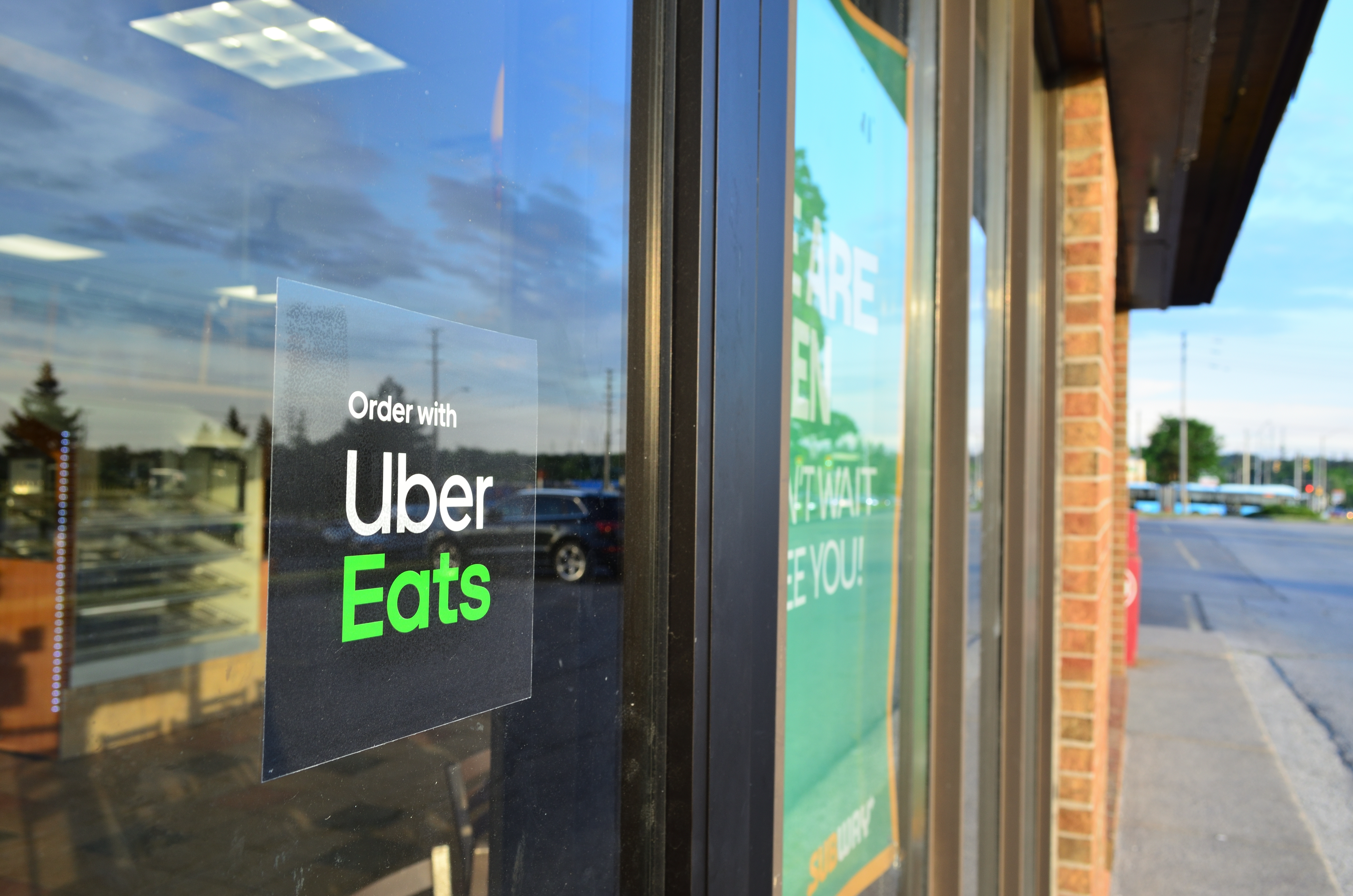
Uber Eats sign at a Subway Restaurant

Uber Eats' parent company Uber was founded in 2009 by Garrett Camp and Travis Kalanick. The company began food delivery in August 2014 with the launch of the UberFRESH service in Santa Monica, California, where the subsidiary was led by Jason Droege. In 2015, the platform was renamed UberEats and the ordering software was released a standalone application initially launching in Toronto, Canada. In 2016, it commenced operations in both London and Paris.

In March 2018, Uber sold its ride-hailing and Uber Eats operations in Southeast Asia to rival Grab for a 27.5% stake; at the time, Uber Eats was active in Malaysia, Singapore and Thailand, with plans to expand further in the region.

In August 2018, Uber Eats changed its flat $4.99 delivery fee to a rate that is determined by distances. The fee ranges from a $2 minimum to an $8 maximum. In the United Kingdom and Ireland, the delivery fee is based on the value of the order. In February 2019, Uber Eats announced that it would reduce its fee from 35 percent of the order's value to 30 percent. As part of its expansion into foreign markets, the company announced its intention to open virtual restaurants in the United Kingdom. Sometimes called cloud restaurants or cloud kitchens, these are restaurant kitchens staffed to prepare and deliver food, either for existing brick-and-mortar restaurants wishing to move their delivery operations offsite, or for delivery-only restaurants with no walk-in or dining room service.

In November 2018, the company announced plans to triple its workforce in its European markets. As of 2026, Uber Eats is available in more than 6,000 cities across 45 countries worldwide.

In 2019, Uber Eats said it would deliver food to customers by drones from the Northern Hemisphere in the summer of 2019, and partnered with Apple on the release of the Apple Card. In July, Uber Eats began offering a dine-in option in certain cities that allowed customers to order food ahead of time and then eat in the restaurant.

In September 2019, Uber Eats said it would leave the South Korea market, with Reuters attributing this to the amount of competition for food delivery companies in the country. In October, Uber Eats launched the pick-up option. On October 15, 2019, the company said it would deliver Burger King fast food throughout the United States.

On January 21, 2020, Zomato said it would acquire all of Uber Eats's stock in India. As part of the deal, Uber would own 10% stake in Zomato and Zomato would gain all the users of Uber Eats in India. At the time of the deal, Zomato was valued at roughly $3.55 billion. In August 2022, Uber fully exited India's online food delivery market after selling its remaining stake in Zomato.

On January 28, 2020, it was reported that Uber Eats no longer had exclusive delivery rights for McDonald's in the United Kingdom, as the fast food company had partnered with British-based food-delivery company Just Eat. The company had already lost its exclusive delivery rights with McDonald's in the United States the year before.

In February 2020, then-Uber Eats head, Jason Droege, stepped down from his position. At the time of his resignation, Uber Eats became the company's second-largest revenue source behind its ridesharing service.

In March 2020, during the COVID-19 pandemic, Uber Eats saw a 30% rise in new customers, as people avoided social interaction for fear of contracting the virus.

In May 2020, Uber Eats announced its plan to discontinue operations in eight countries: the Czech Republic, Egypt, Honduras, Romania, Saudi Arabia, Uruguay, Ukraine, and the United Arab Emirates. In the United Arab Emirates, service was transferred to Careem, a Dubai-based vehicle for hire company owned by Uber. A similar transition occurred in Saudi Arabia, where operations were also handed over to Careem.

Uber bolstered its position in July 2020 with the acquisition of Postmates for $2.65 billion.

In November 2020, Uber Eats confirmed its withdrawal from Argentina and Colombia, with operations ending in those countries by December 2020.

In December 2021, Uber Eats completed its first food delivery in space when it partnered with Japanese billionaire Yusaku Maezawa to send food to the International Space Station. That same year, Uber Eats exited the Hong Kong market after five years of operation. The company stated that it had made a strategic decision to focus on other markets where it could achieve sustainable growth.

In January 2022, Uber announced that it would cease Uber Eats operations in Brazil by March of the same year. The decision was part of a broader review, with Uber opting to focus on other services within the country, such as ride-hailing and delivery of groceries and other goods.

In March 2022, Uber Eats added a fuel surcharge to deliveries in the United States and Canada. The new surcharge will be different depending on the delivery length and gas prices in each state.

During the COVID-19 pandemic, Uber Eats has been criticized for charging fast-food restaurants 30% to 35% commission.

In April 2022, Uber Eats partnered with the U.K.'s largest grocer, Tesco, to start in 20 stores and to guarantee delivery of an order within one hour.

In May 2022, Uber Eats launched two autonomous delivery pilots in Los Angeles with Serve Robotics and Motional.

In December 2022, Uber Eats has partnered with Cartken, a self-driving 6-wheeled sidewalk bot, in Miami. The delivery system, originally from Oakland, is set to deliver food and groceries to residents in Miami. Consumers will be alerted when their food has arrived and they will go and retrieve their goods. Cartken and Uber Eats have not yet released how many bots will be in service, nor where they are headed next.

In 2022, Uber Eats introduced autonomous machines that run on six wheels present around areas of West Yorkshire, England. These robots are able to complete deliveries in less than 30 minutes for distances up to two miles (3.2km). Safety concerns were presented about the potential robbery of said robots, Headingley and Hyde Park councillor Jonathan Pryor stated “the robots could be sharing the streets with thousands of revellers taking part in the Otley Run pub crawl every week.” Starship Technologies has partnered with Uber Eats to make this happen. Uber Eats additionally stated a partnership with Coco Robotics, an American robotics company.

In January 2024, Uber announced it would shut down the alcohol delivery service Drizly by March 2024 in an effort to consolidate their brand in Uber Eats. The company plans to merge the discontinued apps into Uber Eats.

In May 2024, Uber announced its intention to acquire Delivery Hero’s Foodpanda business in Taiwan for approximately $950 million in cash; however, Taiwan’s Fair Trade Commission blocked the deal in December 2024 and Uber ultimately terminated the agreement in March 2025 without appealing, paying a termination fee of about $250 million.

In May 2025, Uber announced its entry into the Turkish food delivery market through the acquisition of an 85% stake in Trendyol Go, a local meal and grocery delivery service. The transaction, valued at approximately $700 million. Trendyol Go is a subsidiary of Trendyol, a major Turkish e-commerce company that is majority-owned by the Chinese multinational Alibaba Group.

In February 2026, Uber announced plans to expand Uber Eats into Austria, the Czech Republic, Denmark, Finland, Greece, Norway and Romania. Uber Eats had previously exited several of these markets in 2020. The service subsequently launched in Denmark and Finland, but in July 2026 Uber paused the remainder of its planned European expansion, shelving launches in the other five markets as it pursued a takeover of Delivery Hero. In March 2026, Uber Eats also resumed operations in Argentina following its withdrawal from the market in 2020.

== Lawsuits against Uber Eats and other controversies ==
=== Lawsuit for allegations of monopolistic behavior ===
In April 2020, a group of New Yorkers sued Uber Eats along with DoorDash, Grubhub and Postmates, accusing them of using their market power monopolistically by only listing restaurants on their apps if the restaurant owners signed contracts which include clauses that require prices be the same for dine-in customers as for customers receiving delivery. The plaintiffs state that this arrangement increases the cost for dine-in customers, as they are required to subsidize the cost of delivery; and that the apps charge “exorbitant” fees, which range from 13% to 40% of revenue, while the average restaurant's profit ranges from 3% to 9% of revenue. The lawsuit seeks triple damages, including for overcharges, since April 14, 2016 for dine-in and delivery customers in the United States at restaurants using the defendants’ delivery apps. The case is filed in the federal U.S. District Court, Southern District of New York as Davitashvili v GrubHub Inc., 20-cv-3000. Although a number of preliminary documents in the case have now been filed, a trial date has not yet been set.

=== Antitrust lawsuit ===
In 2022, the company is facing a lawsuit for antitrust price manipulation, from forcing restaurants to charge the same price for delivery as for dine-in if the restaurant wants to be listed on the Uber Eats app, along with charging fees of 13–40% of revenue.

=== Courier pay protest ===
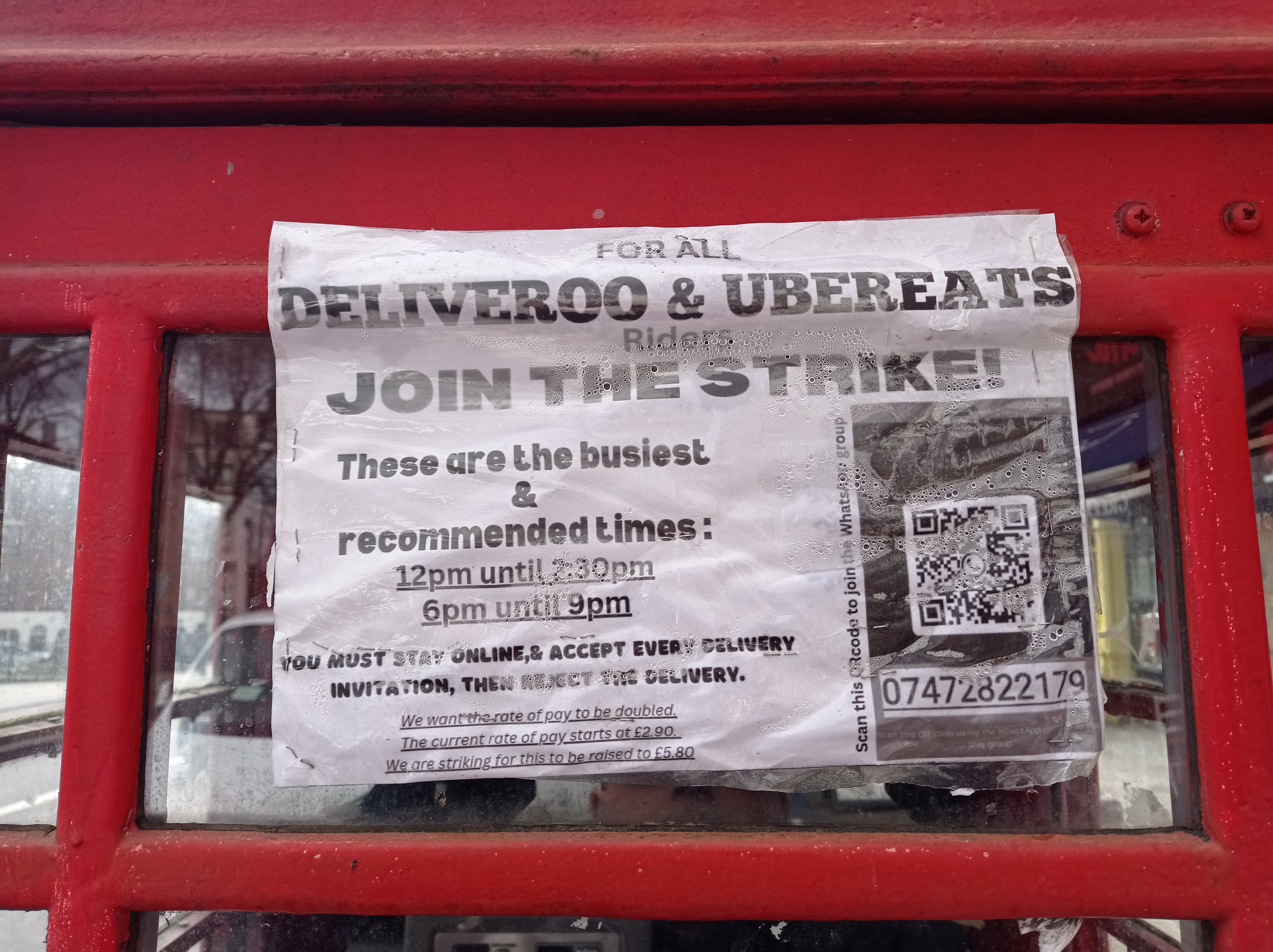
Advertisement for the Deliveroo & Uber Eats strike, London, February 2024

In February 2024, Uber Eats delivery drivers in the United Kingdom went on strike and stopped delivering between 5pm and 10pm as part of a protest organised by Delivery Job UK. The aim of the protest is to raise courier pay to a minimum of £5 per order. The strike is the largest to hit the platform in the UK.

=== AI bias settlement ===
In March 2024, a black Uber Eats courier received an undisclosed sum as a payout from the company after the app's AI-powered facial recognition denied him continued access to the app and later initiated his account's deletion in 2021. The company has been using AI for facial recognition since April 2020 to confirm that drivers' selfies match the pictures that Uber has on record for them, as a form of identity verification.

=== Whistleblower hoax ===
In January 2026, an anonymous Reddit user claiming to be an employee of a "major food delivery app" made a post outlining alleged unfair actions done by the platform, such as slowing down standard deliveries to make users pay for priority orders or giving all drivers a "desperation score" to pay the most desperate drivers as little as possible. The post quickly gained popularity, getting over 86,000 upvotes in a few days. While the author didn't directly name the app, they sent a photo of an Uber Eats badge to the journalists as proof of their words. An Uber Eats spokesperson commented on the allegations, denying them and suspecting that the post is made up. It was later confirmed that the post was fabricated, and the photo of the badge, as well as other documents the poster was presenting as evidence to journalist, were generated using AI.

== Finances ==
Year	Revenue (bil. USD)
2017	0.6
2018	1.5
2019	1.9
2020	4.8
2021	8.3

== See also ==
- Timeline of Uber
