= Paris Marx =

Canadian technology journalist

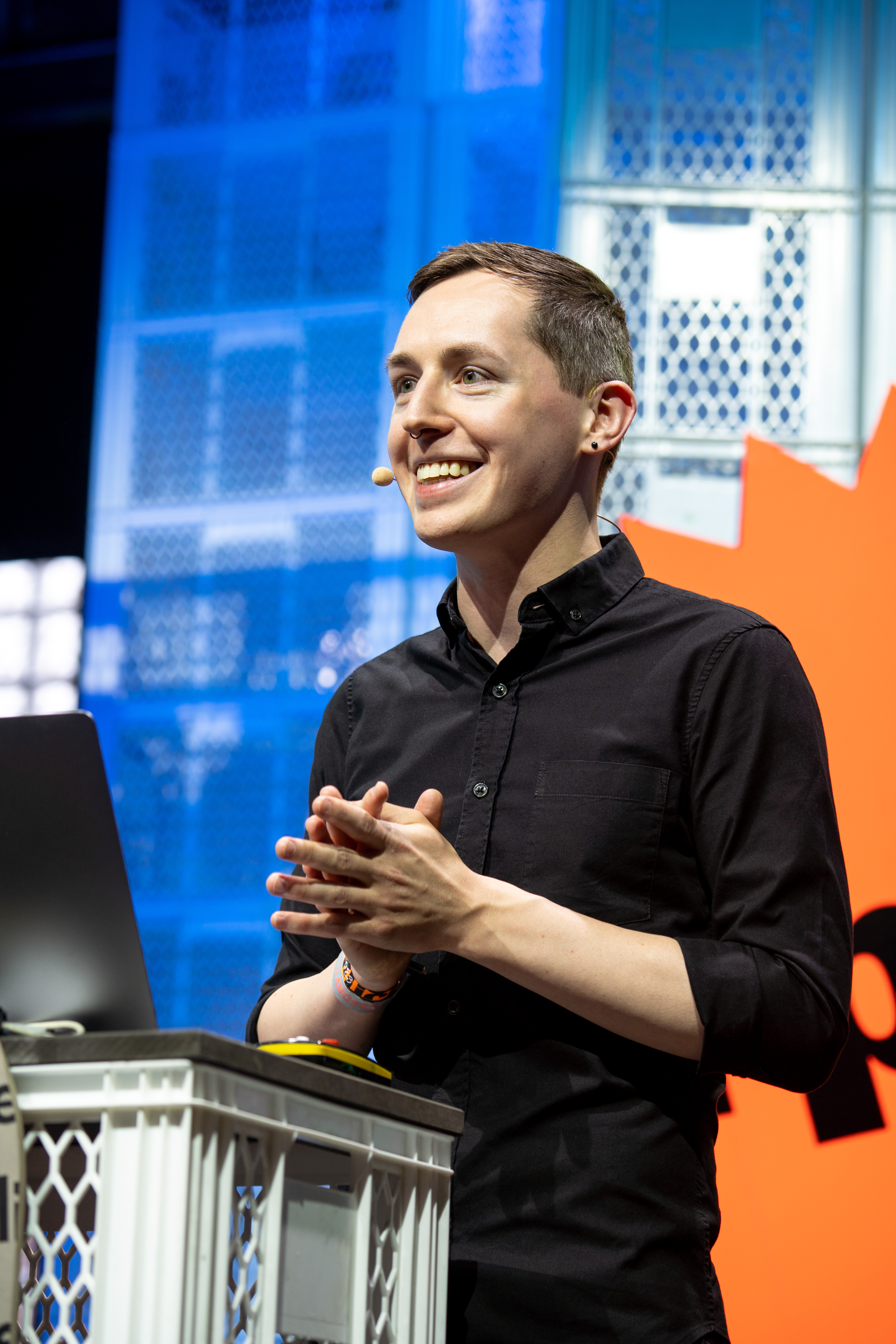
- Marx in 2023
- Education: MA in Urban Geography from McGill University
- Occupations: Journalist, author
- Notable work: Road to Nowhere: What Silicon Valley Gets Wrong about the Future of Transportation
- Website: parismarx.com

Paris Marx is a Canadian technology journalist, author, podcaster, and critic. Marx is the author of Road to Nowhere: What Silicon Valley Gets Wrong about the Future of Transportation (2022) and Hyperscale: The Ambition and Excess of Big Tech's Data Empires (2026) and hosts the tech industry–critical podcast Tech Won't Save Us.

== Early life ==
Marx was born in Newfoundland and raised in St. John's.

== Career ==
Marx earned a master's degree in urban geography from McGill University, researching Silicon Valley and its influence on transportation. He also studied as a PhD candidate at the University of Auckland.

Marx began writing about the tech sector in 2015, producing the blog Radical Urbanist. As of October 2023, Marx's commentary and interviews have appeared in Time, Wired, NBC News, MIT Technology Review, Jacobin, and CBC News. Much of the focus of Marx's work explores the "Silicon Valley hype machine" and its greater effects on American culture, while advocating for a greater emphasis on collective methods to tackle issues the Tech Industry attempts to address through privatization. Marx's podcast Tech Won't Save Us, started in 2020, provides a leftist perspective on "the underbelly of both the [tech] industry and digital culture" without being "doom-laden or scaremongering."

In 2022, Verso Books published Marx's Road to Nowhere, a critical study expanding on his Master's work. The book explores Silicon Valley's proposed visions of the transportation sector and how its products often exploit the material conditions of economic structures. Marx ultimately argues that viewing technology as the sole solution for inner-city traffic and climate change in turn does little to help society as a whole.

In 2026, Riverhead Books published Marx's Hyperscale.

=== Coverage of Elon Musk ===
Marx has been playfully described as a "Muskologist" given his consistent critical coverage of Elon Musk. His Time article "Elon Musk Is Convinced He's the Future. We Need to Look Beyond Him" argues that Musk's "vision doesn’t align with what’s best for humanity." Much of Marx's most recent work fits into a "spate of negative press about Musk" that the SFist linked to a "collective rethinking" of how to report on the billionaire. The Washington Examiner suggested that Marx holds a "special disdain for Musk’s dreams of a Mars colony."

== Books ==
- Road to Nowhere: What Silicon Valley Gets Wrong about the Future of Transportation (Verso Books, 2022)
- Hyperscale: The Ambition and Excess of Big Tech's Data Empires (Riverhead Books, 2026)

== Selected articles ==
- Marx, Paris (August 8, 2022) "Elon Musk Is Convinced He's the Future. We Need to Look Beyond Him". Time.
