= Inbank =

Company based in Estonia

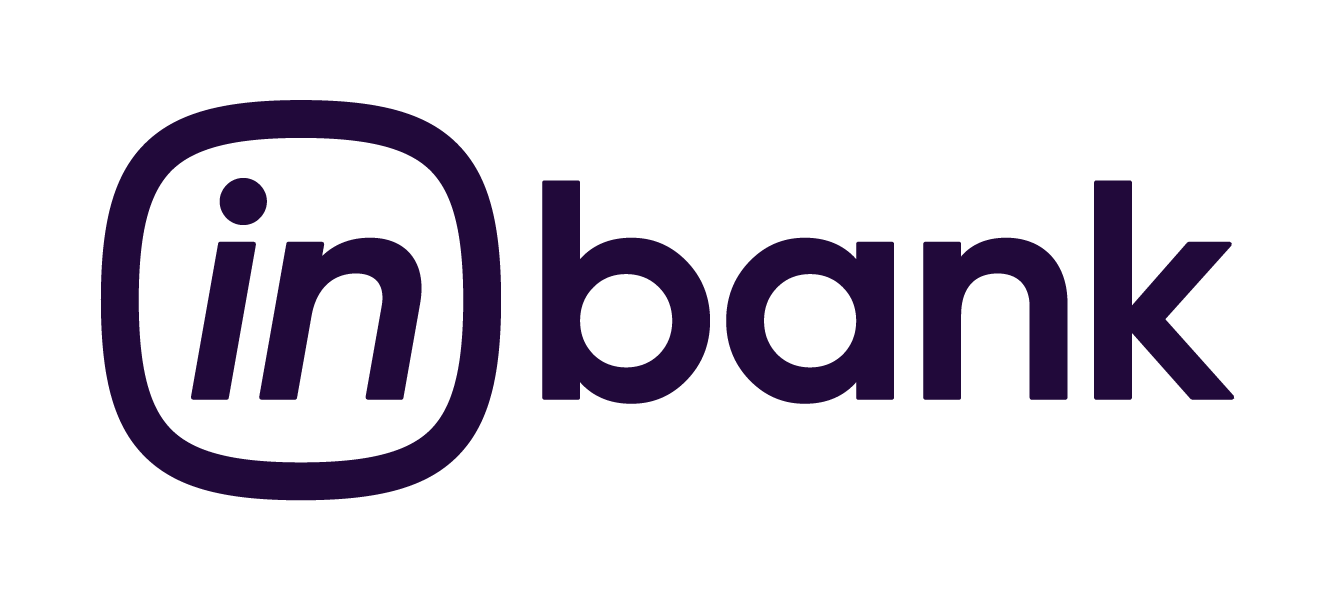
- Company type: Public company
- Industry: Financial services
- Founded: 2015; 11 years ago
- Headquarters: Tallinn, Estonia
- Area served: Estonia, Latvia, Lithuania, Finland, Sweden, Poland, Czechia and Spain
- Products: Retail banking, mortgage loans, corporate banking
- Revenue: ▲€770 million (2025)
- Net income: ▲€85 million (2025)
- Total assets: ▲€1.58 billion (2025)
- Website: www.inbank.ee

Inbank is a bank with Estonian roots, headquartered in Tallinn, Estonia. The bank operates in Estonia and in four nearby countries. The founder and CEO of Inbank is Jan Andresoo.

The bank's history started in 2011 when company named Cofi was established. In 2015, Cofi obtained the banking license and Cofi was renamed to Inbank.

The bank's bonds are listed on Nasdaq Tallinn.

As of 2020, the bank has 550,000 active client contracts in four countries.

== See also ==
- List of banks in the euro area
- List of banks in Estonia
