= Amazon Scout =

Robot used to deliver Amazon packages

- Type: Robot
- Inception: January 23, 2019
- Manufacturer: Amazon.com
- Website: http://amazon.com/scout

Amazon Scout was a six-wheeled delivery robot used to deliver packages for multinational company Amazon. Amazon Scout originally debuted on January 23, 2019, delivering packages to Amazon customers in Snohomish County, Washington. Amazon scouts move on sidewalks, at a walking pace. In August, 2019, the robots started delivering packages to customers Irvine, California on a test basis, with human monitors. The package is stored inside of the robot, and driven to the customer.

Amazon acquired the robotics company Dispatch to build the robot.

Amazon cancelled Amazon Scout in January 2023.

== Vision and Technology ==
All Amazon Scout robots are fully electric, as a part of Amazon’s movement towards net zero carbon emission by 2040. Amazon plans to use Scout in place of common delivery carriers, and for it to be available with Amazon’s shipping options for Amazon Prime members, such as two-day shipping. Integration of Scout adds to Amazon’s use of automation in delivery infrastructure, as there are already robots in use at Amazon warehouses. It is also helping to transition the Prime program from two-day shipping to faster one-day shipping.

Amazon Scout has been developed to safely navigate around common neighborhood obstacles such as pets and pedestrians. Scout uses tech like sensors and machine learning to navigate streets, as GPS is not reliable or detailed enough. The risks of using Scout are small as well, in comparison to the risks associated with autonomous cars.

== Rollout in Snohomish County, WA ==
Amazon’s first rollout of Scout began in Snohomish County, Washington, with only six devices being used. Scout robots operated Monday through Friday, during daylight hours. They autonomously followed a route set to their destination, but each robot was accompanied by an employee titled an "Amazon Scout Ambassador".

Delivery began in Irvine, California in August 2019 under the same operating conditions used in Snohomish County, WA.

== Further Usage and Future Development ==
According to Amazon Vice President Sean Scott, Amazon is continuing its rollout of Scout in different locations around the US in order to “operate in varied neighborhoods with different climates”. As of November 2020, Amazon Scout robots operated in Atlanta, Georgia, and Franklin, Tennessee as well. Further Scout trials are being conducted at locations like college campuses and office complexes. Delivery with Scout around the US also continued through the COVID-19 pandemic to minimize human-to-human contact.

The current Amazon Scout development team includes former robotics professors who will be developing features like navigation, independent perception, and simulation testing, in order to optimize Scout for future widespread usage. In several ways, federal and local regulations are limiting further investment, development, and testing of Scout. For example, some regulations “limit the use of fully automated devices in public space”, which is why an accompanying Amazon employee has been necessary. There have also been concerns about robots like Scout replacing human workers, and concerns on how residents will react to camera-bearing robots in their neighborhoods.

== See also ==
- Amazon Robotics
- List of mergers and acquisitions by Amazon
