= Road to Nowhere (book) =

2022 book about mass transportation

Road to Nowhere: What Silicon Valley Gets Wrong about the Future of Transportation
- Author: Paris Marx
- Language: English
- Publisher: Verso Books
- Publication date: 2022
- Publication place: Canada
- Media type: Print (hardcover and paperback)
- ISBN: 978-1839765889

Road to Nowhere: What Silicon Valley Gets Wrong about the Future of Transportation is a 2022 non-fiction book by Canadian author Paris Marx.

== Summary ==
The book covers a number of emerging technologies in mass transportation, particularly those that have been widely advocated for by corporations in Silicon Valley, such as ridesharing companies, electric cars, and the Hyperloop. Analysing those technologies, Marx criticises the vision of transportation put forward by Silicon Valley corporations, saying that they fail to resolve many of the issues facing mass transportation, such as environmental and cost-of-living concerns. Marx further advocates for a greater emphasis on collective methods to tackle those issues instead, including public transportation and more democratic urban planning.

== Reception ==
Alastair Dalton of The Scotsman said the book offers "a nightmarish vision of the direction in which technology is taking transport" and "underlines the extraordinary toll exacted by motor vehicles." Rob Larson of Jacobin noted that there were some relevant topics that Marx failed to discuss, namely the use of private jets, but that the book was a "fun read" that "pairs brutally realistic analysis with a consummately Canadian level of indictment." Matthew James Seidel of Protean Magazine described the book as "a sharply rendered, compelling, and illuminating text that combines diffuse histories and complex processes into a clear narrative" and that its "most essential message is its insistence that, whatever the promise of new technologies, they will never serve anyone but the privileged—unless decisions about their use are made in a democratic manner."
