= Last mile (transportation) =

Final leg of a journey in logistics

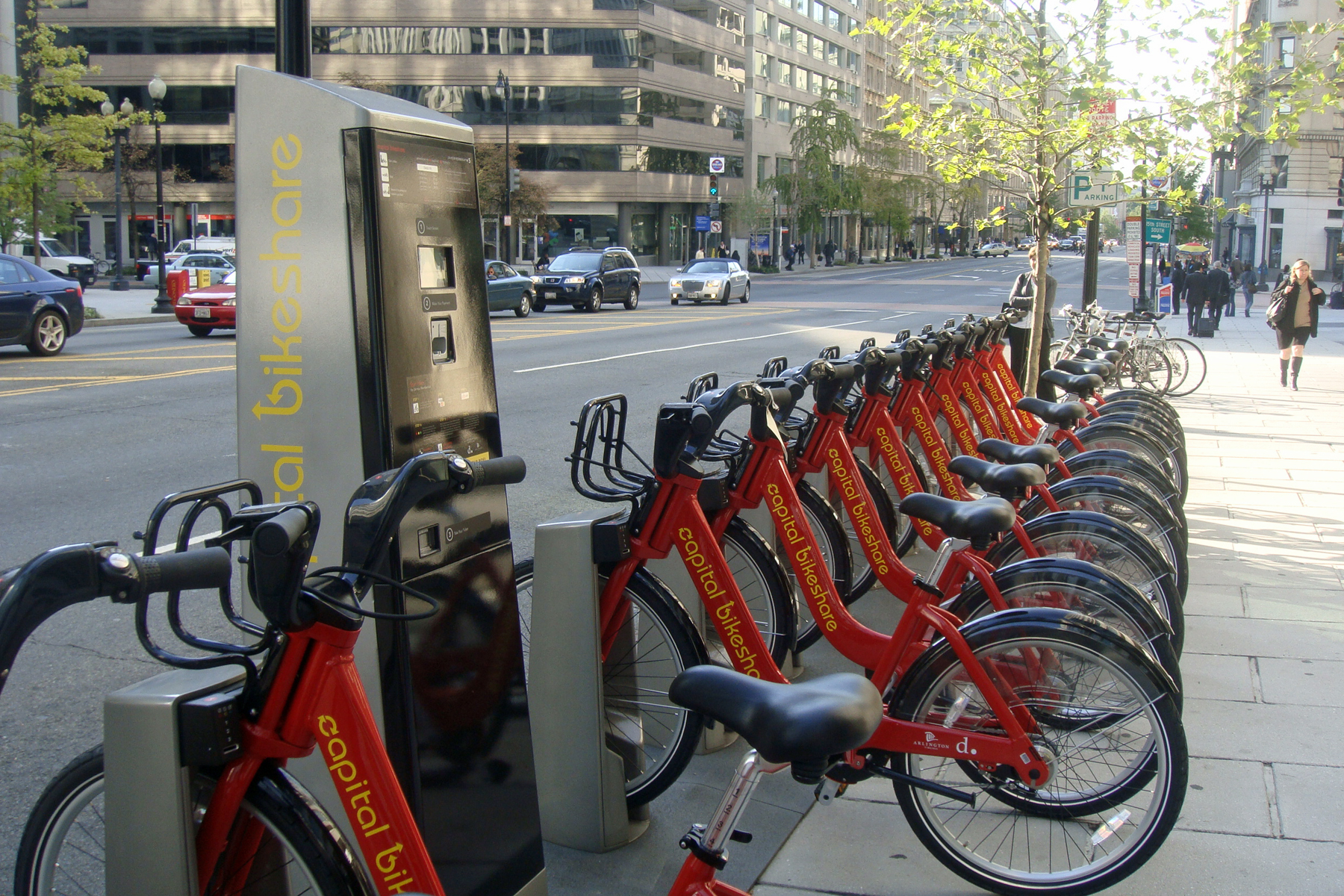
Bicycle sharing systems such as Washington, D.C.'s Capital Bikeshare can increase the practical distance within which passengers can reach destinations.

In supply chain management and transportation planning, the last mile or last kilometer is the last leg of a journey that comprises the movement of passengers and goods from their point of origin or a transportation hub to a final destination. The last mile in a journey could incur significant problems in a journey, even leading to people giving up on their journeys or using different modes of transport to overcome the final leg of a journey. The concept of "last mile" was adopted from the telecommunications industry, which faced difficulty connecting individual homes to the main telecommunications network. Similarly, in supply chain management, the last mile describes the logistical challenges at the last phase of transportation, getting people and packages from hubs to their final destinations.

Last-mile delivery is an increasingly studied field as the number of business-to-consumer (b2c) deliveries grows, especially from e-commerce companies in freight transportation, and ride-sharing companies in personal transportation. Some challenges of last-mile delivery include minimizing cost, ensuring transparency, increasing efficiency, and improving infrastructure.

== The last mile problem ==
The last mile in a journey in the transportation of people refers to the last leg of a journey, usually from the moment a passenger descends from a mode of transportation and most traverse the final leg of the journey to reach the destination. According to John Pritchard and Karel Martens, in some instances because of transportation or land use planning the last part of a journey could incur significant problems in a journey, even leading to people giving up on their journeys or using different modes of transport to overcome the final leg of a journey. The last mile problem refers to last mile being the most expensive stage of the entire logistics journey. In fact, it accounts for 53% of total delivery costs. The factors for the high costs of last mile delivery are numerous:

- Dense urban areas lead to more stops and navigation challenges.
- The surge in e-commerce increases small-scale delivery expenses.
- Customer expectations for rapid deliveries add pressure for costly express options.
- Maintaining a skilled delivery workforce.
- Rising fuel prices, vehicle maintenance.

The last mile problem is exacerbated in rural areas due to dispersed populations and lower demand.

The last mile problem is usually addressed by route optimization methods that lead to reduced mileage, fuel consumption and working hours. Businesses in the last mile sector can either optimize routes manually or use a delivery management technology platform.

== History ==
"Last mile" was originally used in the telecommunications industry to describe the difficulty of connecting end users' homes and businesses to the main telecommunication network. The last "mile" of cable or wire is only used by one customer. Therefore, the cost of installing and maintaining this infrastructure can only be amortized over one subscriber, compared to many customers in the main "trunks" of the network.

In supply chain management the last mile describes a similar problem for transporting either people or freight. In freight networks, parcels can be delivered to a central hub efficiently via ship, train or other means, but they must then be loaded into smaller vehicles for delivery to individual customers. In transportation networks, "last mile" describes the rising marginal cost of getting people from a transportation hub such as an airport or train station to their final destination.

In 2018, Amazon developed a comprehensive logistics network by employing thousands of last-mile delivery vehicles. This had notable effects on the logistics and retail industry, and introduced a new type of competition to both industries. FedEx CEO Fred Smith was quoted, "We basically compete in an ecosphere that's got five entities in it. There's UPS, there's DHL, there's the U.S. Postal Service, and now, increasingly, there's Amazon."

== Usage in distribution networks ==
Transporting goods via freight rail networks and container ships is often the most efficient and cost-effective manner of shipping. However, when goods arrive at a high-capacity freight station or port, they must then be transported to their final destination. This last leg of the supply chain is often less efficient, comprising up to 53% of the total cost to move goods. This has become known as the "last mile problem". The last mile problem can also include the challenge of making deliveries in urban areas. Deliveries to retail stores, restaurants, and other merchants in a central business district often contribute to congestion and safety problems.

A related last mile problem is the transportation of goods to areas in need of humanitarian relief. Aid supplies are sometimes able to reach a central transportation hub in an affected area but cannot be distributed due to damage caused by a natural disaster or a lack of infrastructure.

Third-party logistics providers have begun to use solutions powered by AI when dealing with last mile. AI tools have improved package tracking information for consumers and retailers. More advanced carrier networks integrated with AI allow third-party logistics providers to offer more shipping options to their customers while also offering preferential rates.

== Usage in transportation networks ==
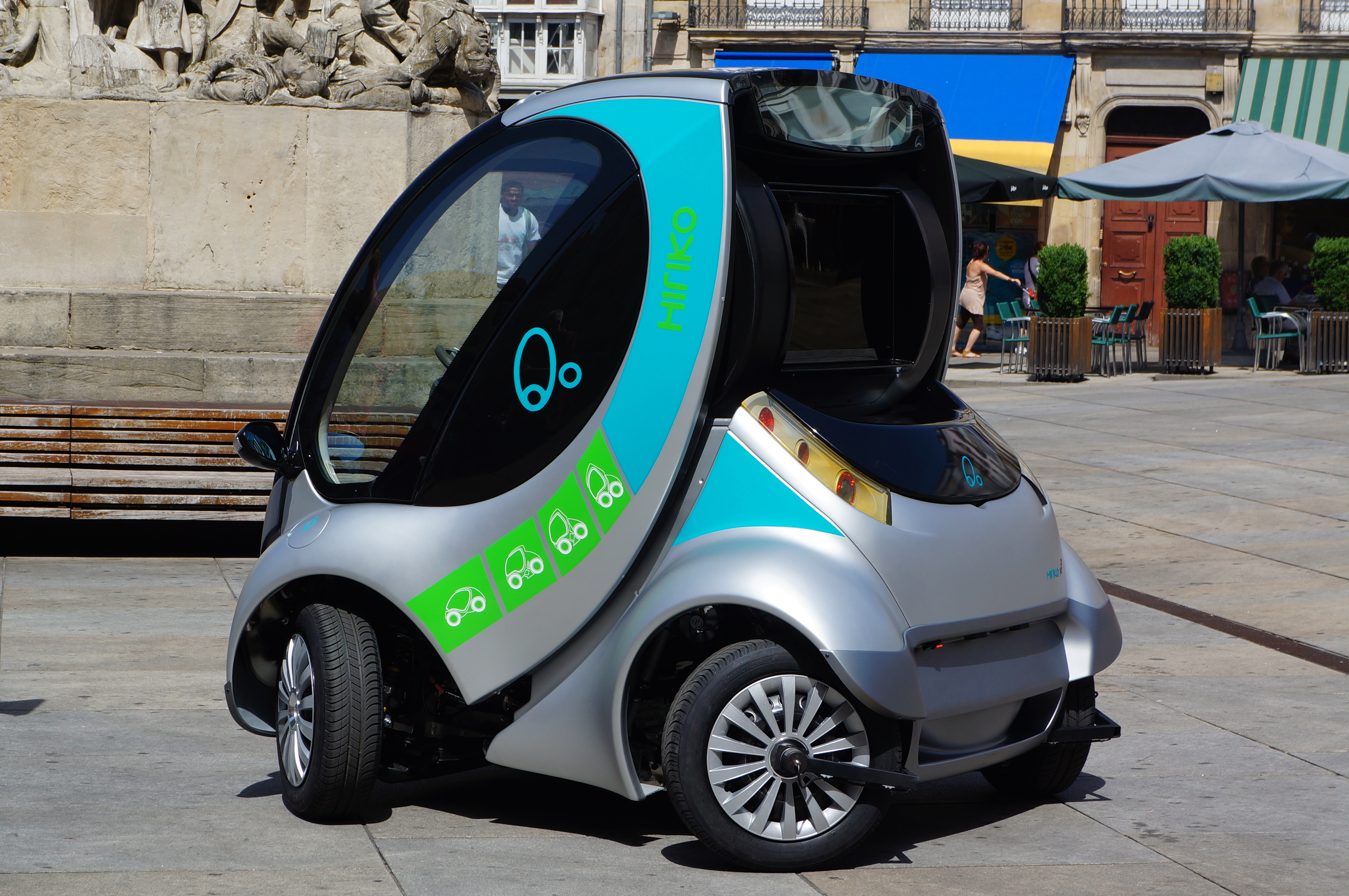
The Hiriko folding two-seat urban electric car was intended to be deployed in Germany in 2013 to provide the last mile of the journey to Deutsche Bahn's railway customers to their final destinations.

"Last mile" also describes the difficulty in getting people from a transportation hub, especially railway stations, bus depots, and ferry berths, to their final destination. When users have difficulty getting from their starting location to a transportation network, the scenario may alternatively be known as the "first-mile problem". In the United States, land-use patterns have moved jobs and people to lower-density suburbs that are often not within walking distance of existing public transportation options. Therefore, transit use in these areas is often less practical. Critics claim this promotes a reliance on cars, which results in more traffic congestion, pollution, and urban sprawl.

Solutions to the last mile problem in public transit have included the use of feeder buses, bicycling infrastructure, and urban planning reform. Other methods of alleviating the last mile problem such as bicycle sharing systems, car sharing programs, pod cars (personal rapid transit), urban air mobility, and motorized shoes have been proposed with varying degrees of adoption. Late in 2015, the Ford Motor Company received a patent for a "self-propelled unicycle engageable with vehicle", which is intended as a last mile commuter solution. Bicycle sharing programs have been successfully implemented in Europe and Asia, and are beginning to be implemented in North America. Starting in late 2017, micro-mobility services that provide shared vehicles such as dockless electric kick scooters or electric-assist bikes entered the marketplace. Dual-mode vehicles, which can operate on infrastructure and outside of infrastructure, are also considered as a solution to the first mile and last mile problem. The same dual-mode vehicle can make the journey to a station and from the station on using infrastructure.

== Solutions ==
According to Dutch transport planner, Karel Martens, bicycles can address the first-mile and last mile problem by increasing the practical distance from which passengers can reach a stop, station from a point of origin or destination from a stop and destination. In the three-country data reviewed by, most bicycle access trips were between 2 and 5 kilometres. Most cyclists using metro stations travelled no farther than 2 kilometres, while about two-thirds of cyclists accessing trains travelled more than 2 kilometres.

== Last mile technology platforms ==
Due in part to demand on retailers and product manufacturers to provide expedited (same and next day) deliveries, tech-enabled last mile technology platforms have emerged. Technological advances have fundamentally transformed how companies manage the final stage of delivery. The use of digital tools and optimized processes not only enhances operational efficiency but also significantly improves customer experience.

Real-time tracking has become a critical competitive advantage. Last-mile delivery tracking systems provide continuous monitoring of order flow, enabling end-to-end visibility across the process. Autonomous technologies transform LMD by reducing human intervention and enhancing operation efficiency, thereby offering scalable solutions across varied environments. These range from UAV or drones, and Autonomous Ground Vehicles (AGVs) to the very important delivery robots, each performing a key role in the reshaping of how deliveries are to be performed, especially in both urban and rural contexts.

Delivery drones, have been important in solving urban congestion and helping raise the speed of delivery. Drones are very viable for small and lightweight packages since they can avoid traffic by flying directly to a delivery point. Delivery robots have been increasingly deployed in recent times for last-mile urban deliveries. This class of vehicles will be largely utilized to make short-distance deliveries through heavy traffic, where the human-driven vehicles go through constant delays. According to Ostermeier et al. The truck-and-robot systems have a very promising potential for decreasing logistics costs and urban traffic. China’s biggest e-commerce player Alibaba Group Holding unveiled an autonomous delivery robot aimed at bringing down the cost of last-mile deliveries and in line with a broader push towards automated deliveries by e-commerce companies amid the pandemic. Xiaomanlv, which translates into English roughly as ‘little competent donkey’, delivered as many as 500 packages a day to one designated community or campus carrying 50 packages at a time.

These technologies powered by optimization algorithms plays a key role in reducing mileage, fuel consumption, and cycle times.

== See also ==
- Active mobility
- Cyclologistics
- Cyclability
- Electric bicycle
- Transit-oriented development – a method for solving the last mile problem by building high-density development within walking distance of a transit station
