= Rajat Suri =

Canadian-American entrepreneur

- Education: Thornlea Secondary School University of Waterloo Massachusetts Institute of Technology (attended)
- Title: Founder and CEO, Tribe

Rajat Suri is a Canadian-American entrepreneur, podcaster, and technology executive. He is the co-founder and CEO of Tribe, a community-focused group chat platform, and previously co-founded Lyft and Presto. He also co-hosts the Founders in Arms Podcast.

== Education ==
In 2007, Suri received a bachelor's in chemical engineering and economics from the University of Waterloo. He was a Ph.D./M.B.A. candidate at Massachusetts Institute of Technology (MIT) until he dropped out to pursue a career as an entrepreneur.

== Career ==
=== Tribe ===
Suri is the founder and CEO of Tribe, described as a futuristic group chat platform built for communities.

=== Lyft ===
Suri was a co-founder of Lyft, formerly known as Zimride, and grew to be the second-largest ridesharing company in the United States.

=== Presto (Presto Technologies Inc.) ===
In 2008, while trying to split a bill with his friends, Suri was inspired to create a product that allowed restaurant customers to order and pay through a tablet. In October 2008, he founded Presto, then known by its legal name E la Carte in Massachusetts. The company is a major player in the customer-facing technology market for full-service and quick-service restaurants.

On November 10, 2021, Suri announced that Presto entered into a definitive merger agreement with Ventoux CCM Acquisition Corp. ("Ventoux") (NASDAQ: VTAQ), a special-purpose acquisition company that will result in Presto becoming a public company. Upon closing, the company will be renamed Presto Technologies, Inc. and expects to list its common stock on Nasdaq. The combined company has a pro forma equity value of approximately $1 billion.

== Podcasting ==
=== Founders in Arms Podcast ===
Suri co-hosts the Founders in Arms Podcast alongside Immad Akhund, CEO of Mercury, where they explore the realms of emerging technology, science, and humanities with the foremost experts in their fields.

Notable guests include: Amjad Masad (CEO of Replit), Parag Agrawal (former CEO of Twitter, CEO of Parallel Web Systems), Guillermo Rauch (CEO of Vercel), Colin Angle (CEO of iRobot), and Severin Hacker (co-founder and CTO of Duolingo).

== Community Initiatives ==
=== South Bay Renaissance ===
In August 2026, Suri helped launch the South Bay Renaissance, a community initiative aimed at strengthening the startup and technology community in California's South Bay and Peninsula. The initiative emerged from concerns about the concentration of startup activity in San Francisco and seeks to encourage professional and social connections among founders, technologists, investors, and local residents.

The South Bay Renaissance organizes gatherings including technology discussions, founders' dinners, networking events, and community activities. Its first gathering took place in Sunnyvale on August 28, 2026.
