= California Public Utilities Commission =

State government agency of California

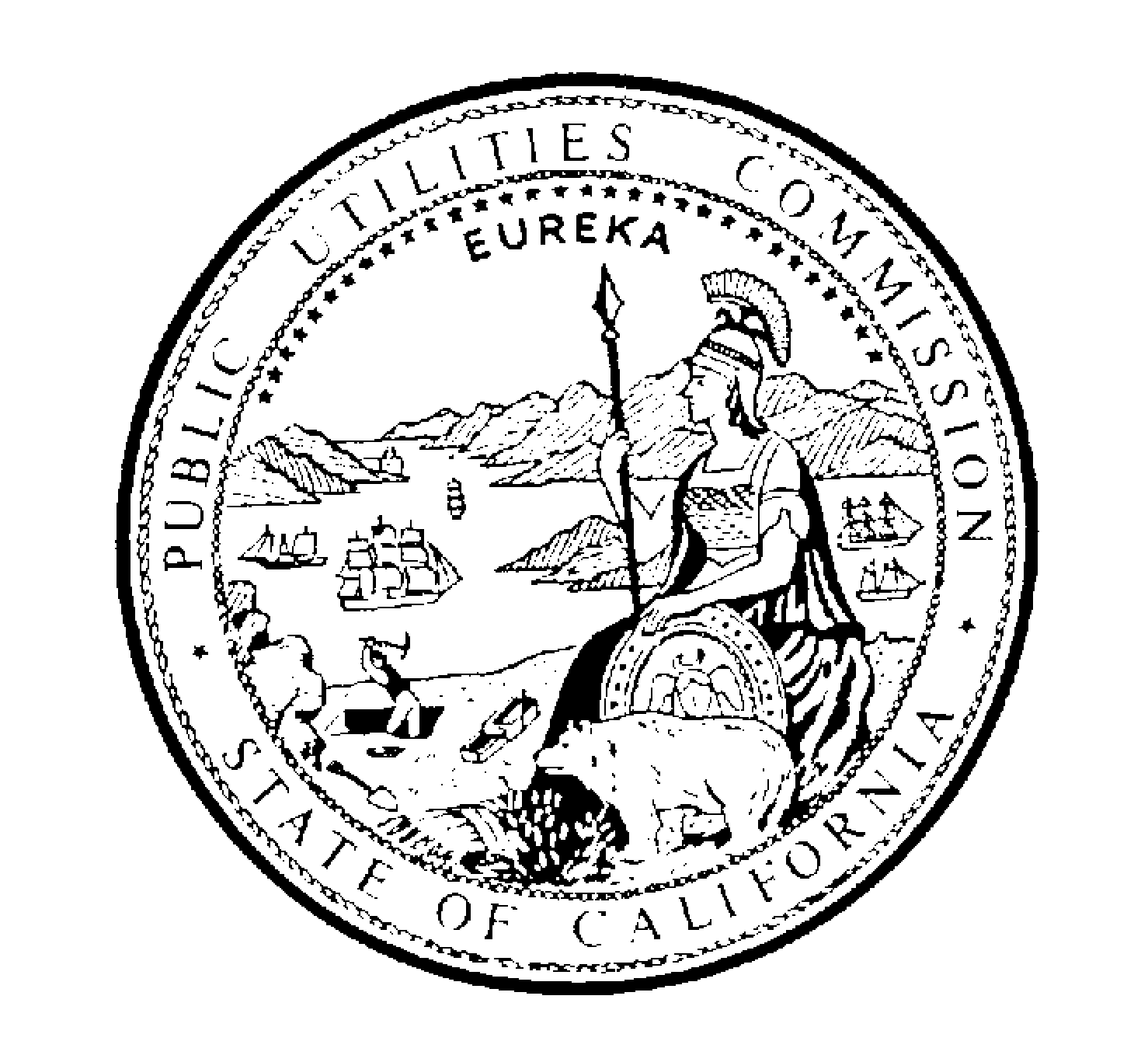
- Seal

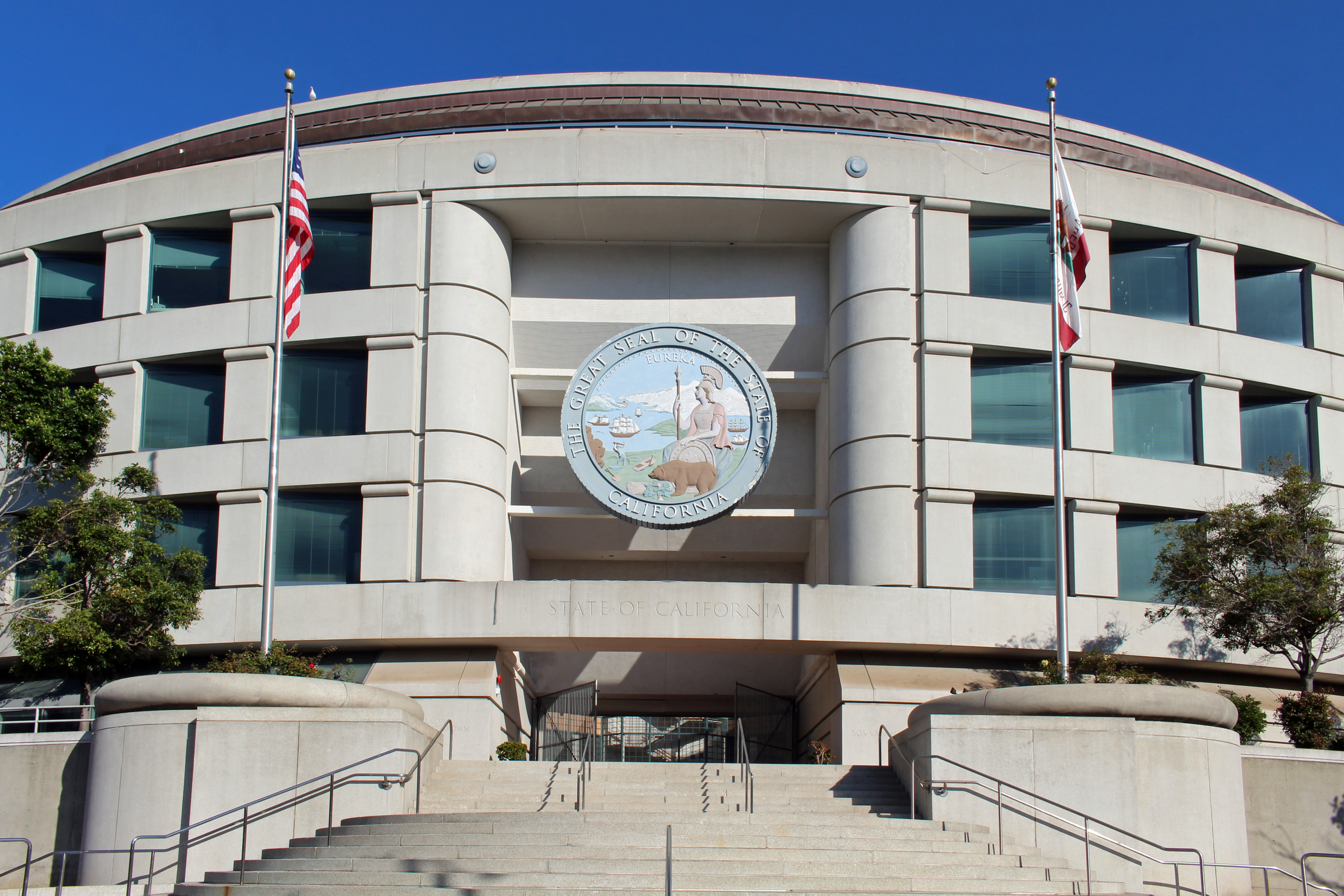
- Headquarters in San Francisco

Commission overview
- Formed: February 10, 1911
- Jurisdiction: California
- Headquarters: 505 Van Ness Avenue, San Francisco, California; 37.78023°N 122.42046°W
- Annual budget: $ 1.6 billion (2019)
- Commission executives: John Reynolds, President-Commissioner; Darcie Houck, Commissioner; Karen Douglas, Commissioner; Matthew Baker, Commissioner; Christine Harada, Commissioner; Leuwam Tesfai, Executive Director
- Website: www.cpuc.ca.gov

The California Public Utilities Commission (CPUC or PUC) is a regulatory agency that regulates privately owned public utilities in the state of California, including electric power, telecommunications, natural gas and water companies. In addition, the CPUC regulates common carriers, including household goods movers, limousines, rideshare services (§ Transportation network companies), self-driving cars, and rail crossing safety. The CPUC has headquarters in the Civic Center district of San Francisco, and field offices in Los Angeles and Sacramento.

== History ==
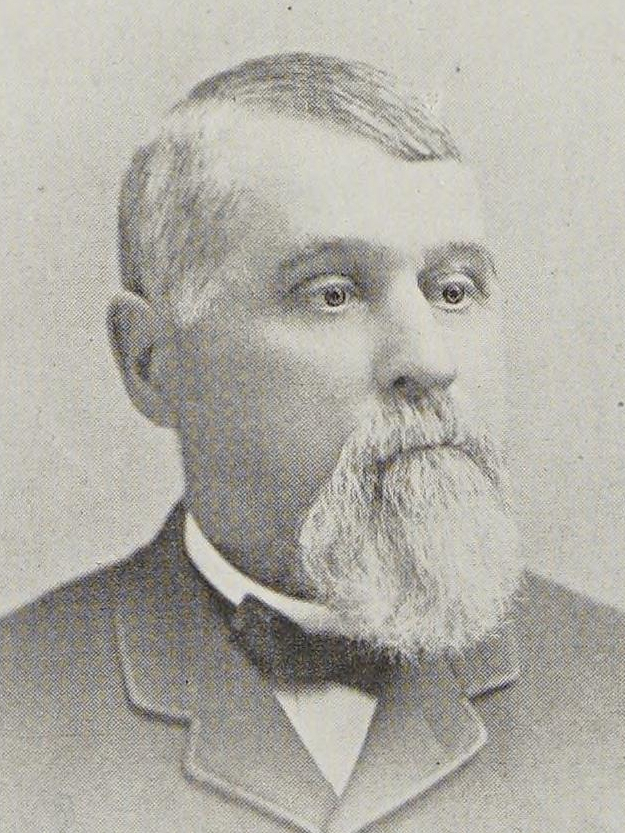
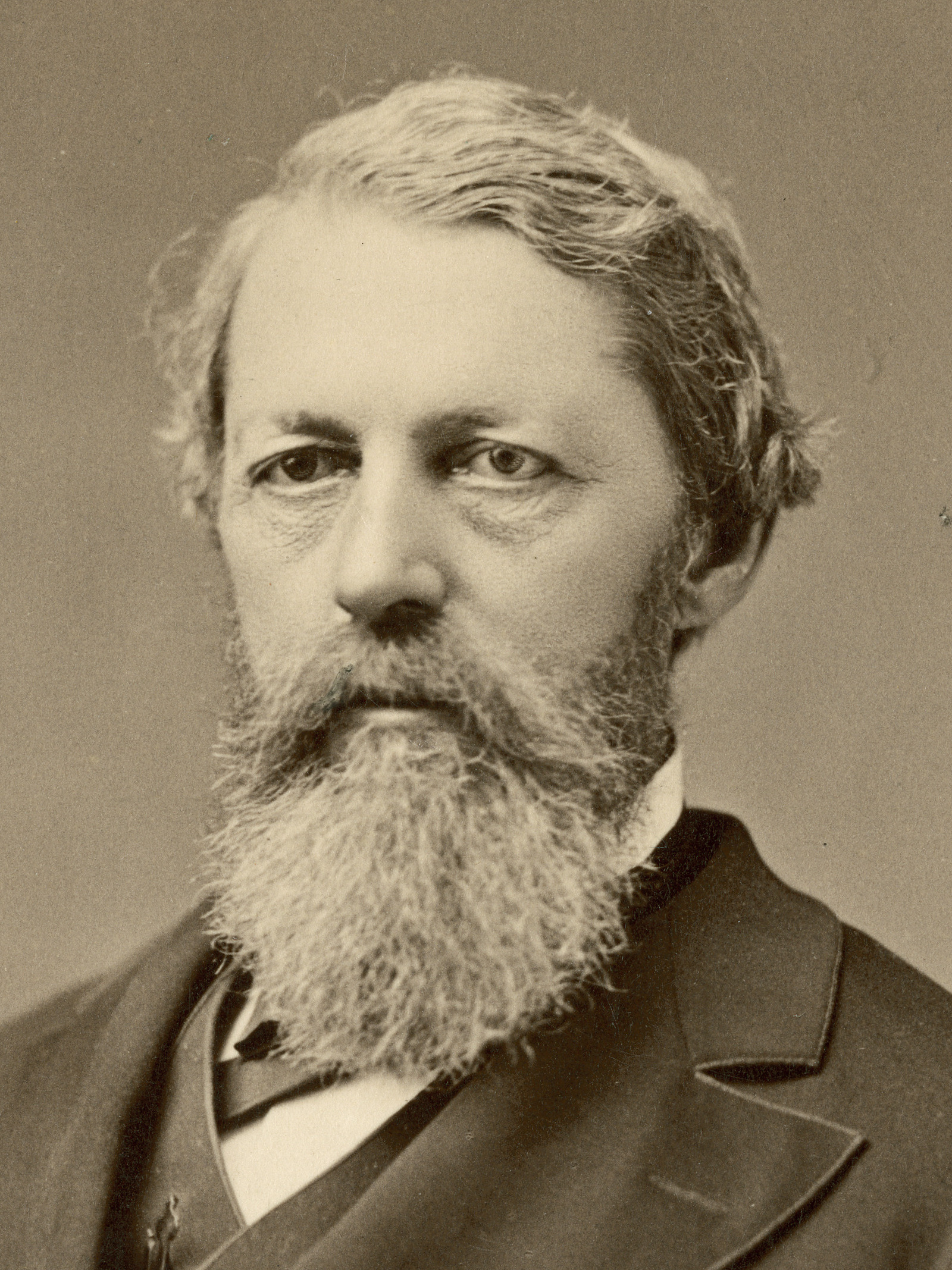
The original three members of the California Railroad Commission.
(L-R): Charles J. Beerstecher (Work.), J. S. Cone (R), George Stoneman (D).

On April 1, 1878, the California Office of the Commissioner of Transportation was created. During the 19th century, public concerns over the unbridled power of the Southern Pacific Railroad grew to the point that a three-member Railroad Commission was established, primarily to approve transportation prices. However, the Southern Pacific quickly dominated this commission to its advantage, and public outrage re-ignited. As experience with public regulation grew, other common utilities were brought under the oversight of the Railroad Commission.

On March 3, 1879, the Constitution of California was adopted by constitutional convention and was ratified by the electorate on May 7, 1879, and included provisions relating to Railroad Commissioners in article XII. On April 15, 1880, the Board of Railroad Commissioners was created. On March 20, 1909, the Railroad Commission of the State of California replaced these other entities. On February 9, 1911, the California Legislature passed the Railroad Commission Act reorganizing the Railroad Commission.

On March 24, 1911, the California Legislature proposed a constitutional amendment giving it constitutional status, which was ratified by the electorate on October 10, 1911. On June 16, 1945, a constitutional amendment was proposed by the legislature to rename the Railroad Commission as the California Public Utilities Commission, which was ratified by the electorate on November 5, 1946.

As a result of the amendment, the Constitution of California declares that the Public Utilities Code is the highest law in the state, that the legislature has unlimited authority to regulate public utilities under the Public Utilities Code, and that its provisions override any conflicting provision of the State Constitution which deals with the subject of regulation of public utilities. In 2013 and 2014, the Office of State Audits and Evaluations (OSAE) audited the CPUC budgeting practices and found significant weaknesses in the CPUC's budget operations. As a result, the CPUC could not assess whether transportation and utility companies are over or under charging ratepayers for user fees. Additionally, the CPUC did not know if user fees were spent on the programs they were collected for. The CPUC did not regularly audit public utilities to ensure the fees they collect from ratepayers were accurately paid to CPUC. Additionally, the CPUC did not consistently pursue delinquent user fees it was aware of, that utility companies collected.

In October 2014, Commission President Michael Peevey decided to step down at the upcoming end of his second six-year term in December. The agency had an apparent cozy relationship with Pacific Gas & Electric, a utility whose gas line exploded in San Bruno killing eight people in 2010. His home in the Los Angeles suburb of La Cañada Flintridge was searched by criminal investigators in January 2015.

In 2020, external auditors from Sjoberg Evanshenk Consulting delivered a series of reports commissioned by the CPUC for roughly $250,000. These reports reaffirmed continued weak budgeting practices and further discovered that approximately $200 million due from utility companies, including $50 million past due since 2017, with portions dating back as far as the 1990s. In February 2021, OSAE reaffirmed these findings, in response to a whistle blower complaint by former executive director, Alice Stebbins.

In December 2020, Alice Stebbins was dismissed from the position of executive director after allegedly "violating state personnel rules" and misleading "the public by asserting that as much as $200 million was missing from accounts intended to fund programs for the state’s blind". However, "Bay City News Foundation and ProPublica found that Stebbins was right about the missing money."

== Structure ==
Five commissioners each serve staggered six-year terms as the governing body of the agency. Commissioners are appointed by the governor and must be confirmed by the California State Senate. The CPUC meets publicly to carry out the business of the agency, which may include the adoption of utility rate changes, rules on safety and service standards, implementation of conservation programs, investigation into unlawful or anticompetitive practices by regulated utilities and intervention into federal proceedings which affect California ratepayers.

As of March 2025, the commissioners are:

- President Alice Busching Reynolds (appointed November 22, 2021 by Gov. Gavin Newsom, effective December 31, 2021, and confirmed August 17, 2022; term expires January 1, 2027)
- Matthew Baker (appointed February 16, 2024 by Gov. Gavin Newsom; term expires in 2030)
- Darcie L. Houck (appointed February 9, 2021 by Gov. Gavin Newsom; term expires in 2027)
- John Reynolds (appointed December 23, 2021 and reappointed December 22, 2022 by Gov. Gavin Newsom; term expires in 2027)
- Karen Douglas (appointed December 22, 2022 by Gov. Gavin Newsom; term expires in 2027)

Some regulatory laws are implemented by the California State Legislature through the passage of laws. These laws often reside in the California Public Utilities Code. The CPUC Headquarters are in San Francisco with offices in Los Angeles and Sacramento and the CPUC employs 1000 including judges, engineers, analysts, lawyers, auditors, and support.

== Exclusions ==
The CPUC does not regulate the rates of utilities and common carriers operated by government agencies. Thus, such organizations as the Los Angeles Department of Water and Power, San Francisco's Bay Area Rapid Transit, and other municipally operated utilities or common carriers are not subject to rate regulation or tariff schedule filing with the CPUC. However, all municipal utilities and carriers in California must follow Public Utilities provisions on holding hearings and obtaining public input before raising rates or changing terms of service, and municipal utility customers have means of appeal of potential disconnections. Additionally, the CPUC has jurisdiction over components of the safety operations of government-run utilities and common carriers.

== Energy and climate change ==
The CPUC regulates investor-owned electric and gas utilities within the state of California, including Pacific Gas & Electric, Southern California Edison, Southern California Gas and San Diego Gas & Electric. Among its stated goals for energy regulation are to establish service standards and safety rules, authorize utility rate changes, oversee markets to inhibit anti-competitive activity, prosecute unlawful utility marketing and billing activities, govern business relationships between utilities and their affiliates, resolve complaints by customers against utilities, implement energy efficiency and conservation programs and programs for the low-income and disabled, oversee the merger and restructure of utility corporations, and enforce the California Environmental Quality Act for utility construction. In 2008, the CPUC adopted California's first Long Term Energy Efficiency Strategic Plan. Leuwam Tesfai has served as Director of Energy Division and Deputy Executive Director of Energy and Climate Policy since 2022.

=== California Solar Initiative ===
The California Solar Initiative (CSI) is overseen by the California Public Utilities Commission (CPUC) and provides incentives for solar system installations to customers of the state's three investor-owned utilities (IOUs): Pacific Gas and Electric Company (PG&E), Southern California Edison (SCE) and San Diego Gas and Electric (SDG&E). The CSI program provides upfront incentives for solar systems installed on existing residential homes, as well as existing and new commercial, industrial, government, non-profit, and agricultural properties within the service territories of the IOUs. The CSI program has a goal to install 1,800 MW of new solar (excluding solar water heating) by the end of 2016. As of January 13, 2015, the CSI program has achieved a total of 1,743 MW of installed capacity, 96.8% of the program's goal, since its inception.

On January 12, 2006, the CPUC issued an Interim Order that set initial policy and funding for the program. The CPUC was nearing an August 24, 2006 Commission vote on proposed incentive level design, administrative structure, and planning schedule, when SB 1 was signed into law on August 21, 2006, by Governor Arnold Schwarzenegger. While SB 1 codified the state's commitment to the creation of a self-sustaining solar market, it also introduced several unanticipated requirements for the program. In order to conform to state law, the CPUC then worked with parties to issue a proposed decision on SB 1's impacts to the California Solar Initiative program for public comment; this decision was approved by Commissioners on December 14, 2006. The program launched on January 1, 2007.

The CSI Program was designed to be responsive to economies of scale in the California solar market – as the solar market grows, it was expected solar system costs would drop and incentives offered through the program decline. The CPUC divided the overall megawatt goal for the incentive program into ten programmatic incentive level steps, and assigned a target amount of capacity in each step to receive an incentive based on dollars per-watt or cents per-kilowatt-hour.

=== Greenhouse gas emissions standards ===
In January 2007, the CPUC adopted a greenhouse gas emissions standard that required new long-term commitments for baseload generation to serve California consumers with power plants that have emissions no greater than a combined cycle gas turbine plant. The CPUC said the emissions standard is a vital step in addressing global warming.

=== Cap and trade ===
On February 8, 2008, CPUC President Michael Peevey issued a proposed decision on the implementation of California's greenhouse gas emissions legislation, AB 32. The decision recommends a cap and trade program for the electricity sector in California that would impose regulations on owners and operators of generation in California and out-of-state generators delivering electricity to the California electrical grid.

=== Zero Net Energy ===
In 2007 the CPUC adopted goals to have all California residential construction use zero net energy by 2020, and all new commercial construction use zero net energy by 2030. Zero Net Energy buildings each contribute an amount of renewable energy to a utility that will balance out any amount of non-renewable energy they extract from the utility. For residential buildings, the CPUC participates in California's Zero Net Energy program that helps builders and homeowners select effective home energy upgrades.

== Telecommunications ==
=== Communications ===
The CPUC regulates intrastate telecommunications service and also the terms and conditions of service of wireless phone providers (but not entry or rates, which are the responsibility of the Federal Communications Commission). The CPUC has developed a consumer-oriented communications website. The CPUC also reviews third-party-verification recordings to monitor for telephone slamming.

The Digital Infrastructure and Video Competition Act of 2006 (DIVCA) made the CPUC responsible for video (what were formerly known as cable TV) franchises. The DIVCA granted the CPUC limited authority to regulate video service providers via a statewide franchise scheme. The CPUC is responsible for licensing video service providers, and enforcing certain anti-discrimination and build out requirements imposed by the Act. Local franchise authorities will continue to regulate rights of way used by video providers, handle consumer complaints, and requirements as to public, educational, and government access (PEG) channels. Previously, licensing of franchises was handled by local authorities such as the Sacramento Metropolitan Cable Television Commission.

The CPUC also played a key role in the Governor's Broadband Task Force formed in 2006. The task force produced two reports making recommendations to the Governor on what could be done to enhance broadband in California, engaging in a broadband mapping project for California, and producing a broadband speed report. In response to the Task Force mapping project and report, the CPUC launched an innovative California Advanced Services Fund (CASF), which is an infrastructure grant program for deploying broadband in unserved areas of California. The program is funded by a telephone surcharge of 0.56% for the period of March 1, 2018 to December 31, 2022. As of AB 1665, passed in October, 2017, broadband providers may apply for up to 100% funding of capital costs to deploy last-mile broadband in unserved areas. Unserved areas are those where no facility-based broadband provider offers service at speeds of at least 6 megabits per second downstream and 1 megabit per second upstream.

=== Call recording ===
The concept behind General Order 107-B is that telephone calls cannot be recorded in California unless all parties to the call know it is being recorded.

The order gives specific requirements for lawfully recording telephone calls. Based on the 1983 version, one way to meet the requirements may be to give a verbal warning. This often occurs by the playing of a recording in an automatic call distribution queue: "Your call may be recorded or monitored for quality assurance purposes."

Another method allowed to warn all callers a call is being recorded is the presence of a recorder warning tone: a 1,440 Hz tone repeating every fifteen seconds. In the 1960s, radio stations with call-in programs used to employ a recorder warning tone. The law now exempts lines used for call-in to broadcasts or cablecasts since it is presumed a caller to a telecast is aware their call is subject to being transmitted or recorded and intends for this to happen.

The order requires that telephone utilities disconnect telephone service for violating the order.

== Transportation ==
=== Transportation network companies ===
A transportation network company (TNC) is a company that uses an online-enabled platform to connect passengers with drivers using their personal, non-commercial, vehicles. Examples include Lyft, Uber, Wingz, Haxi and Summon.

The definition of a TNC was created by the CPUC in 2013, as a result of a rulemaking process around new and previously unregulated forms of transportation. Prior to the definition, the CPUC had attempted to group TNC services in the same category as limousines. Taxi industry groups opposed the creation of the new category, arguing that TNCs are taking away their business as illegal taxi operations.

The CPUC established regulations for TNC services at the same time as the definition. These included driver background checks, driver training, drug and alcohol policies, minimum insurance coverage of $1 million, and company licensing through the CPUC.

=== Intrastate airlines ===
Prior to the federal Airline Deregulation Act in 1978, the CPUC regulated intrastate airlines operating in California including jet air carriers Pacific Southwest Airlines (PSA) and Air California; neither still exists.
