= Risher =

Risher is a surname. Notable people with the surname include:

- Alan Risher (born 1961), American football player
- Anna Priscilla Risher
- David Risher (born 1965), American businessman and philanthropist
- John R. Risher (1938–1999), American attorney
- Tim Risher (born 1957), American composer
