= Zimride =

American carpool program

- Type: Rideshare
- Industry: Service
- Founded: 2007
- Headquarters: San Francisco, California, U.S.
- Key people: Logan Green, co-founder John Zimmer, co-founder Rajat Suri, co-founder
- Products: Rideshare
- Parent: Enterprise Holdings
- Website: www.zimride.com

Zimride by Enterprise Holdings was an American carpool program that matched inter-city drivers and passengers through social networking services. It was offered to universities and businesses as a matchmaking service. The company was founded in May 2007. After the launch of the Lyft app in May 2012 for intra-city rides, the Lyft app rapidly grew and became the focus of the company. Zimride officially renamed as Lyft in May 2013, and the Zimride service was sold to Enterprise Holdings in July 2013. As of July 2013, the service had over 350,000 users and had partnerships with Facebook and Zipcar.

In January 2015, the service removed the public ride sharing option and was offered solely as a matching service within universities and businesses. On December 31, 2020, Zimride suspended their Service indefinitely according to an announcement on their homepage.

== History ==
=== Beginnings ===
The company was founded by Logan Green, John Zimmer, and Rajat Suri. Green developed Zimride after sharing rides from the University of California, Santa Barbara campus to visit his girlfriend in Los Angeles. He had used Craigslist's ride boards, but wanted to eliminate the anxiety of not knowing the passenger or driver. He began working on the app after Facebook opened its API to third-party developers.

Zimmer was inspired by the empty seats he had during his commute from Upstate New York to New York City while an analyst at Lehman Brothers. As a student at Cornell University, Zimmer took classes on transportation. After learning of the progression from canals to railroads to highways, he viewed ridesharing as the next step towards efficiency. Noting that 80% of the seats on American highways are empty, Zimmer asserted that ridesharing is "a huge opportunity to create efficiency to save a lot of money and to reduce our environmental footprint.

Zimmer and Green were introduced through a mutual friend and met on Facebook. Green had posted details about his new company called "Zimride", which interested Zimmer, who had been keeping a journal about carpooling ideas. The company name comes from the country Zimbabwe, where Green had observed locals develop a grassroots public transportation system.

=== Investments ===
In 2007, Zimride raised $250,000 in seed money from Facebook's fbFund, expanded to six employees, and took on Stanford and Dartmouth as clients. fbFund selected Zimride, along with ten other startups, out of 1,000 applicants.

In August 2010, Zimride announced a $1.2 million round of seed funding from FLOODGATE, K9 Ventures, Keith Rabois, and Teddy Downey. In 2011, Zimride closed a $6 million Series A round of funding from the Mayfield Fund, FLOODGATE, and K9 Ventures, bringing their total investments to $7.5 million.

=== Growth ===
In 2007, Green and Zimmer launched the first version of the rideshare program at Cornell University; in six months, the service had signed up 20% of the student body. Green and Zimmer promoted the service through guerrilla marketing; in particular, the pair would dress in frog suits and hand out flyers to Cornell students. Later, while on a Lehman Brothers recruiting trip, Zimmer was recognized by a potential recruit, who had seen him wearing a frog suit on campus. By 2007, Zimride was active on both Cornell's and UCSB's campuses. Zimmer later quit his job at Lehman Brothers to work with Green full-time on Zimride.

In April 2012, Zimride had 29 employees and had facilitated more than 26,000 carpools. The service was active at over 125 universities including USC, University of Minnesota, UCLA, UCSF, Cornell, Harvard, and the University of Michigan. Universities paid around $10,000 per year to use the platform. Travel between San Francisco and Los Angeles was the most popular route on Zimride.

In 2012, Zimride redesigned its website for use on smartphone web browsers. The new version of the site was designed by LinkedIn's mobile product and design lead Frank Yoo.

=== Lyft and sale to Enterprise Holdings ===
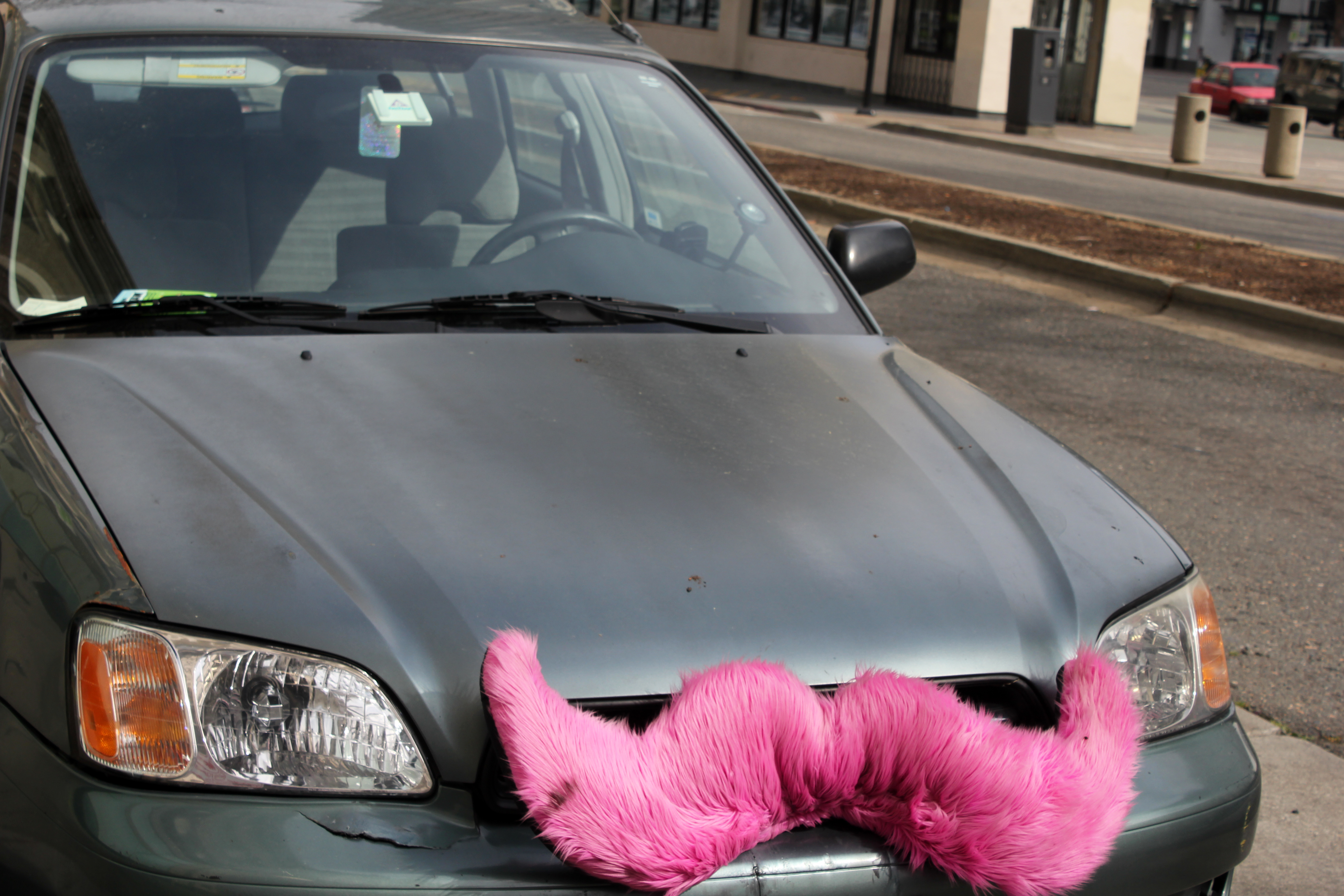
A car with a distinctive pink mustache that indicates its owner is sharing it through Lyft

In May 2012, Zimride announced Lyft, which allowed users to request a driver immediately and receive a ride anywhere. After the rapid growth of Lyft, led the company Zimride was renamed to Lyft in May 2013, and ultimately Zimride the service (excluding Lyft) was sold to Enterprise Holdings on July 13, 2013.

== Structure ==
Users first selected a network that a given corporation or university had set up. A driver could post a trip and available seats in his or her car, along with personal details like smoking and musical preferences, allowing passengers to find a match for the destination. The service only connected people that work at the same company or go to the same school, reducing anxiety and lack of trust which according to Zimmer, was the number one reason for past carpooling failure.

Creating a Zimride profile is free. The site uses an algorithm that accounts for the distance to pick someone up and the time for detouring to a passenger drop-off point. The site then ranks the options and assigns a score to the best matches. Drivers decide what to charge passengers, although Zimride offers suggested charges based on gas costs. Passengers can pay with PayPal or credit card, and will receive a full refund if the driver fails to pick up. The routes between San Francisco and Los Angeles and San Francisco to Lake Tahoe are both public routes, which means drivers can sell seats in their cars to buyers, who purchase the trip like a plane ticket. The majority of Zimride users are women.

== Zipcar partnership ==
In 2009, Zimride partnered with Zipcar to allow customers who have rented out a Zipcar to bring passengers on trips. The plan originated years before when Zimmer reached out to Zipcar CEO Scott Griffith while working at Lehman Brothers.

== Results and reception ==
The site had over 350,000 registered users as of July 2013. Representatives at the University of Southern California note that Zimride is "a lot different than reading a blank ad. It's been received well on campus". Reuters noted "The Zimride brand promise is to reduce CO_{2} emissions, lower the annual strain on our transportation infrastructure and help everyone involved save money. They just may have a shot at making carpooling sexy". In 2009, Zimmer and Green were named finalists in Business Week's list of America's Best Young Entrepreneurs.

Zimride has partnered with concert company Live Nation and music festivals Bonnaroo, Coachella, and Lollapalooza to hold ridesharing contests that award users with prizes. Zimride has also partnered with Jack Johnson, Dave Matthews Band, and Sheryl Crow to provide ridesharing to their events.

Zimride users sometimes become friends with their passengers or drivers. Zimmer's goal for Zimride was to bring "communities together and help people save money".

== See also ==
- Lyft
- Uber
- Carpool
- Sharing economy
- Haxi
- Summon
