= Presto (restaurant technology platform) =

Technology platform

Presto is a technology platform for the restaurant industry developed by Redwood City–based E la Carte. The company targets the customer-facing technology market for full-service and quick-service restaurants. Their products consist of computer vision, speech recognition, AI, tabletop tablets, and server tablets. As of October 2019, customers include Applebee's, Chili's, Outback Steakhouse, Denny's, Checkers, and Red Lobster.

== History ==
Presto, then known by its legal name E la Carte, was founded by Rajat Suri in October 2008 in Massachusetts. Suri was a graduate student at MIT when he created the first E la Carte product, a tablet that allows restaurant customers to order and pay through a tablet. He left his graduate program to become a waiter in order to learn more about the restaurant industry. Previously, Suri was a cofounder of Zimride, now known as Lyft.

E la Carte was accepted into Silicon Valley–based seed accelerator Y Combinator in 2010. The same year, Suri moved to California and opened a Palo Alto office.

E la Carte first installed its touchscreen tablets in restaurants in the San Francisco Bay Area in 2011. The tablets could take orders, act as a sommelier, receive payments, split bills, and calculate tips. In August 2011, Lightbank invested $4 million in venture capital in E la Carte.

In June 2013, Intel Capital invested $13.5 million in Series B funding in E la Carte, with participation from Romulus Capital. Later that year, E la Carte relocated to a new office in Redwood City. Applebee's signed a deal with E la Carte to deploy 100,000 tableside tablets to its locations by the end of 2014.

E la Carte rebranded to Presto in 2018. In 2019, Presto raised $30 million in growth financing led by Recruit Holdings and Romulus Capital to grow its AI platform. Presto began piloting its computer vision program called Presto Vision in October 2019.

In November 2021, Presto announced a merger with Ventoux CCM Acquisition Corp. The company will be renamed Presto Technologies, Inc.

In February 2024, Presto named Gee Lefevre as its new CEO. Lefevre was tasked with a turnaround of the business following several months of instability. Three months after his appointment, Lefevre conducted a number of interviews indicating a "reemergence" of Presto with several new product advancements and overall business stability.

== Products ==
The Presto platform operates on the Android operating system, and supports EMV and mobile payment technologies. Presto's products include computer vision, conversational AI voice ordering, AI, line-busting tablets, server handheld tablets, tabletop tablets for guests, and kiosks. With Presto systems, restaurants experience an increase in check sizes, turn tables at least 10 minutes faster, and increase tips by an average of 16%.

In 2020, Presto began to offer a contactless dining system to restaurants in response to the COVID-19 pandemic. The system enables restaurant customers to scan a QR code with their phone in order to view the menu, place orders, and make payments.

In August 2021, Presto launched its new voice capability . The system is powered by a set of highly accurate conversational artificial intelligence technologies.

Presto introduced its all-in-one restaurant platform in September 2021 called Presto Flex.
