= Vugo =

Vugo may refer to:

- Vugo (company), software company that develops rideshare advertising
- VuGo, a portable media player later renamed TVNow, from the Now brand
