= Ridesharing company =

Online vehicle for hire service

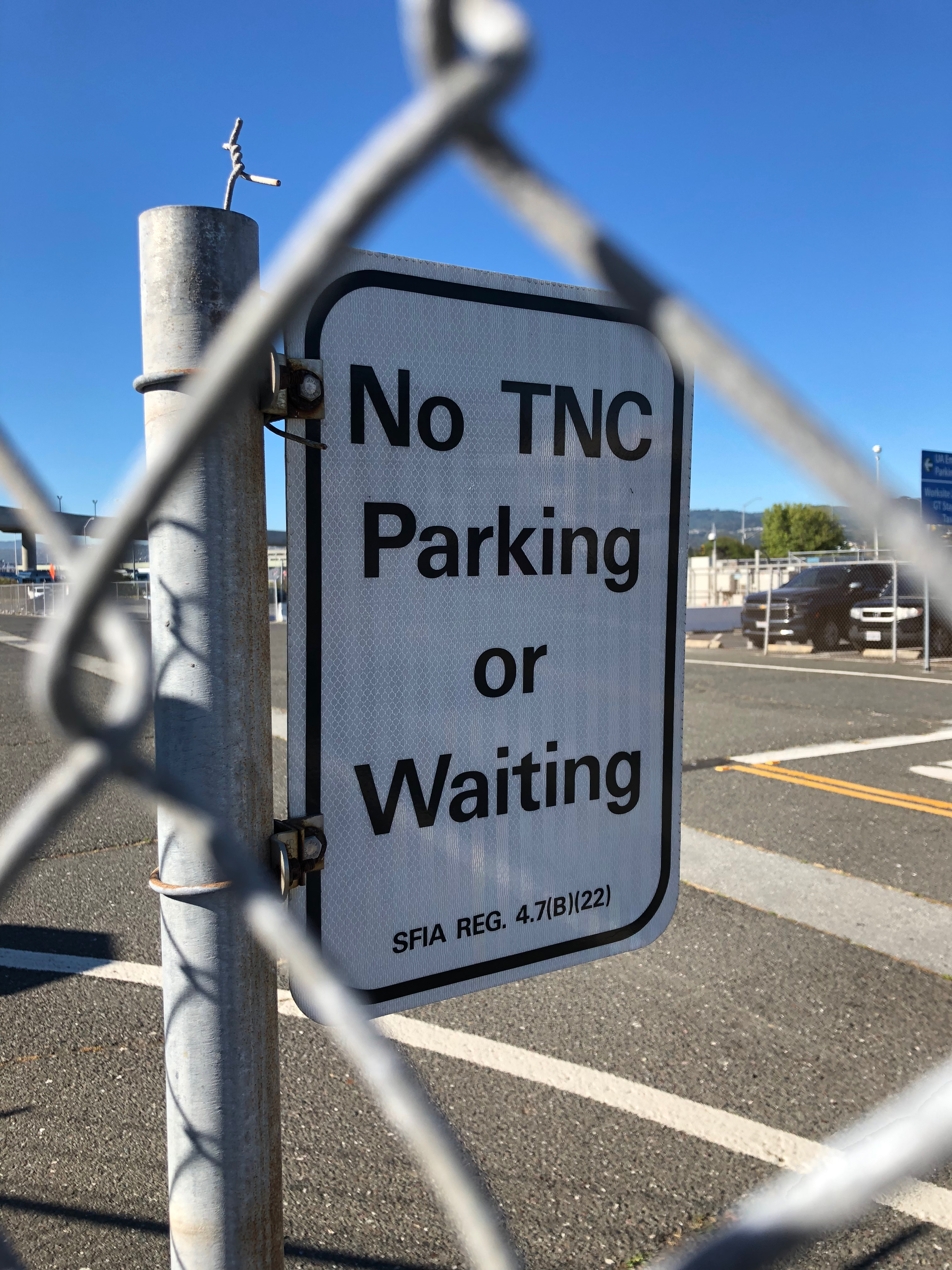
Airports in California, such as the San Francisco International Airport, regulate where TNC (Transportation Network Companies - the legal term for rideshare companies in California) vehicles may pick up, drop off, or wait for passengers.

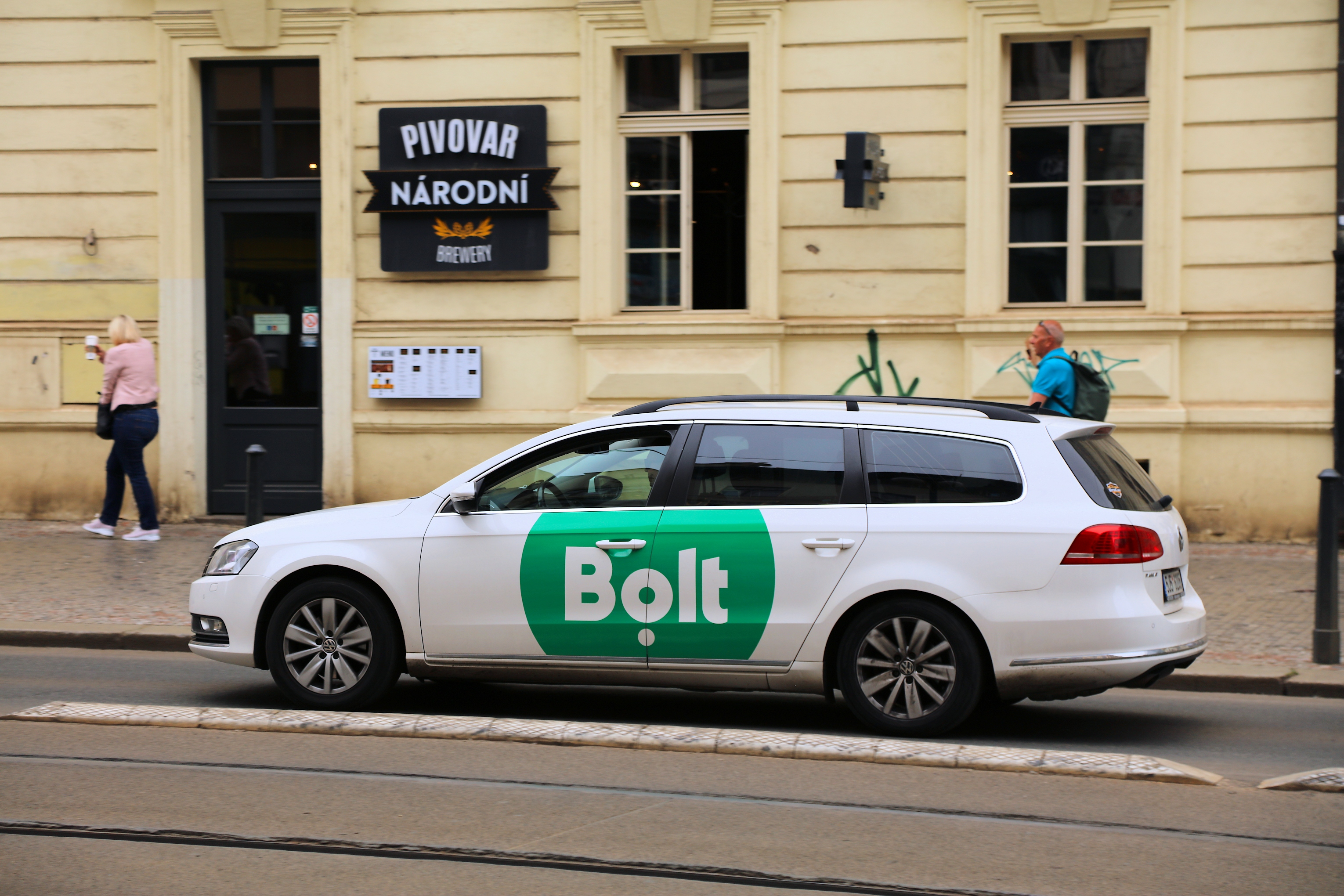
Bolt car in Prague

A ridesharing company (or ridehailing service) is a company (or service offered by a company) that, via websites and mobile apps, matches passengers with drivers of vehicles for hire that, unlike traditional taxis, cannot legally be hailed from the street. In most cases, the company sets fares, which may vary using a dynamic pricing model based on local supply and demand at the time of the booking and are quoted to the customer in advance, and receives a commission from each booking. Some ridesharing companies provide services in robotaxis.

Ridesharing companies proliferated in the 2010s due to the growing use of mobile apps.

The legality of ridesharing companies by jurisdiction varies; in some areas they are considered to be illegal taxi operations, while in other areas, they are subject to regulations that can include requirements for driver background checks, fares, caps on the number of drivers in an area, insurance, licensing, and minimum wage. Countries including Bulgaria, Germany, Denmark, Hungary, and Jamaica have issued bans or extremely strict regulations such that no ridesharing companies operate within.

Ridesharing companies have been subject to lawsuits for seeking to classify drivers as independent contractors, enabling them to withhold worker protections that they would have been required to provide to employees.

== Terminology: ridesharing vs. ridehailing ==
Although the term "ridesharing" is used by many international news sources, in January 2015, the Associated Press Stylebook, the authority that sets many of the news industry's grammar and word use standards, officially adopted the term "ride-hailing" to describe the services offered by these companies, claiming that "ridesharing" doesn't accurately describe the services since not all rides are shared, and "ride-sourcing" only is accurate when drivers provide rides for income. While the Associated Press recommended the use of "ride-hailing" as a term, it noted that, unlike taxis, ridesharing companies cannot pick up street hails.

The term "ride-sharing" has also been defined to refer to on-demand carpooling or shared transport, whereas "ride-hailing" has been defined as the hiring of a private driver for personal transportation.

== History ==
Carpooling was popular in the mid-1970s due to the 1973 oil crisis and the 1979 energy crisis. The first employee carpools/vanpools were organized then at Chrysler and 3M.

In the 1990s, carpooling was popular among college students, where campuses have limited parking space. The feasibility of further development of carpooling was investigated although the comprehensive technologies were not commercially available yet at the time. Ridesharing programs began migrating to the Internet in the late 1990s.

A 2006 report by the Federal Transit Administration stated that "next day" responsiveness has been achieved but that "dynamic" ridematching has not yet been successfully implemented.

In 2009, Uber was founded as Ubercab by Garrett Camp, a computer programmer and the co-founder of StumbleUpon, and Travis Kalanick, who sold his Red Swoosh startup for $19 million in 2007.

In 2011, Sidecar launched. Its founder Sunil Paul patented the idea of hailing a ride via mobile app in 2002.

Lyft was launched in the summer of 2012 by computer programmers Logan Green and John Zimmer as a service of Zimride, an intercity carpooling company they founded in 2007.

Careem began operations in July 2012.

Bolt, a mobility company operating in Europe and Africa, was founded in 2013.

In 2013, California became the first state to regulate such companies; they are regulated as public utilities by the California Public Utilities Commission.

Starting in 2020, ridesharing services were also provided by robotaxis.

Freenow covered 150 European cities when it was acquired by Lyft in 2025. Other ride-hailing apps include Cabify in Spain and South America, Go in Japan, and Grab in southeast Asia.

== Driver classification under employment law ==
Unless otherwise required by law, ridesharing companies have classified drivers as independent contractors and not employees under employment law, arguing that they receive flextime not generally received by employees. This classification has been challenged legally since it affects taxation, minimum wage requirements, working time, paid time off, employee benefits, unemployment benefits, and overtime benefits.

Jurisdictions in which drivers must receive the classification of "employees" include the United Kingdom (after the case of Aslam v Uber BV which was decided by the Supreme Court of the United Kingdom), New Zealand, Switzerland, New Jersey, and the Netherlands. California Assembly Bill 5 (2019) was passed to force drivers to be classified as employees in California, although ridesharing companies received an exemption by 2020 California Proposition 22, a ballot initiative. Ridesharing companies spent tens of millions of dollars on the campaign. In 2025, California Governor Gavin Newsom signed AB 1340 into law, which gave rideshare drivers the right to collectively bargain with rideshare companies despite their classification as independent contractors rather than employees.

In some jurisdictions, laws were passed to guarantee drivers a minimum wage before and after expenses as well as paid time off and insurance benefits.

== Impact ==
=== Impact on safety ===
Crimes have been committed by rideshare drivers as well as by individuals posing as rideshare drivers who lure unsuspecting passengers to their vehicles by placing an emblem on their car or by claiming to be a passenger's expected driver. The latter led to the murder of Samantha Josephson and the introduction of Sami's Law. Ridesharing companies have been accused of not taking necessary measures to prevent sexual assault. They have been fined by government agencies for violations in their background check processes.

Ridesharing has also been criticized for encouraging or requiring phone use while driving. To accept a fare, some apps require drivers to tap their phone screen, usually within 15 seconds after receiving a notification, which is illegal in some jurisdictions since it could result in distracted driving.

Ridesharing vehicles in many cities routinely obstruct bicycle lanes while picking up or dropping off passengers, a practice that endangers cyclists.

=== Driver bias against passengers in certain demographic groups ===
While audit studies have shown that some rideshare drivers discriminate against riders on the basis of race, discrimination has been shown to be less than that of taxi drivers.

In a study set in Los Angeles in 2017, the author had participants of different races request rides from Uber, Lyft, and taxis. She found that Black riders were 73% (11 percentage points) more likely to have a taxi driver cancel on them than White riders. On the other hand, she found that Black riders were only 4 percentage points more likely to be cancelled on by an Uber driver than White riders (there was no statistically significant difference in likelihood for Lyft).

In a study set in Boston in late 2015 to 2016, Lyft drivers were able to see all information in a rider's profile (including their uploaded photo and name) when reviewing a ride request; however, Uber drivers were only able to see a rider's name (and not their picture) after accepting a ride request. Riders were assigned distinctly "African American sounding names" and "white sounding names" to use when requesting a ride from both Uber and Lyft. Uber's setup of not allowing drivers to see rider's names till after a ride was accepted meant that the authors could quantify rates of discrimination by keeping track of how often riders assigned white sounding names were cancelled on compared to those assigned African American sounding names. In the end, the authors found that the riders assigned African American sounding names were more than twice as likely to get cancelled on as those assigned White sounding names. Despite this large disparity across the two groups, the authors found that there was no statistically significant difference in how long each group had to wait for a driver to arrive.

In 2024, a study by researchers at Carnegie Mellon University was published that focused on explaining why African American and White riders could experience such different cancellation rates but very similar wait times. Using an agent-based model developed to simulate real Uber and Lyft trips that have occurred in the city of Chicago, they found that the rapid rematching speed of Uber and Lyft drivers after a cancellation drastically reduces the effect of that cancellation on a rider's wait time. However, the paper also found that ridehailing services were not able to overcome the effects of racial residential segregation in Chicago (one of the most racially residentially segregated cities in the country); even when no drivers were cancelling on riders because of their race, the authors found that Black riders were waiting around 50% longer on average than White riders.

In addition to the studies discussed in detail above, a 2018 study in Washington, D.C. found that drivers cancelled ride requests from African Americans and LGBT and straight ally passengers (indicated by a rainbow flag) more often, but cancelled at the same rate for women and men. The higher cancellation rate for African American passengers was somewhat attenuated at peak times, when financial incentives were higher.

=== Impact on jobs ===
Studies published in 2017 showed that ridesharing companies have created net jobs. A study by the National Bureau of Economic Research published in November 2024 stated that "Ridesharing dramatically increased the pace of entry of workers into the taxi industry". More recent studies published in 2025 showed that ride-sharing does not lead to a statistically significant increase in the absolute number of jobs at the city level, but rather transforms the structure of employment. People are moving from other sectors or working part-time, which results in an average increase in temporary employment.

=== Impact on vehicle for hire efficiency ===
Studies have shown that ridesharing companies improved the efficiency of drivers of vehicles for hire due to advanced algorithms that pair riders with drivers. They also provide efficiencies in pricing, allocation of resources, and transaction costs.

=== Impact on taxi drivers ===
Values of taxi medallions, transferable permits or licenses authorizing the holder to pick up passengers for hire, have declined in value significantly. In 2018, this led to failures by credit unions that lent money secured by taxi medallions and suicides by taxi drivers.

=== Impact on traffic congestion ===
Studies have shown that especially in cities where it competes with public transport, ridesharing contributes to traffic congestion, reduces public transport use, has no substantial impact on vehicle ownership, and increases automobile dependency.

Dead mileage specifically causes unnecessary carbon emissions and traffic congestion. A study published in September 2019 found that taxis had lower rider waiting time and vehicle empty driving time, and thus contribute less to congestion and pollution in downtown areas. However, a 2018 report noted that ridesharing complements public transit. A study published in July 2018 found that Uber and Lyft are creating more traffic and congestion. A study published in March 2016 found that in Los Angeles and Seattle the passenger occupancy for Uber services is higher than that of taxi services, and concluded that Uber rides reduce congestion on the premise that they replace taxi rides. Studies citing data from 2010 to 2019 found that Uber rides are made in addition to taxi rides, and replace walking, bike rides, and bus rides, in addition to the Uber vehicles having a low average occupancy rate, all of which increases congestion. A 2021 study found that shifting private vehicle travel to ridehailing services can reduce air pollution costs, on average, but the increased costs from crash risk, congestion, climate change and noise outweigh these benefits. This increase in congestion has led some cities to levy taxes on rides taken with ridesharing companies.

A study published in July 2017 indicated that the increase in traffic caused by Uber generates collective costs in lost time in congestion, increased pollution, and increased accident risks that can exceed the economy and revenue generated by the service, indicating that, in certain conditions, Uber might have a social cost that is greater than its benefits.

== See also ==
- Carpool
- Carsharing, which allows consumer to access automobiles for self-driven journeys
- Demand-responsive transport
- Hitchhiking and slugging, also known as casual carpooling
- Illegal taxi operation
- Mobility as a service
- Peer-to-peer carsharing, where customers drive themselves in cars rented from individual owners
- Rideshare advertising
- Ride sharing privacy
- Sharing economy
- Sustainable transport
- Spaceflight, Inc. - rocket rideshare service
- Vanpool
