= Rideshare advertising =

Type of out-of-home advertising

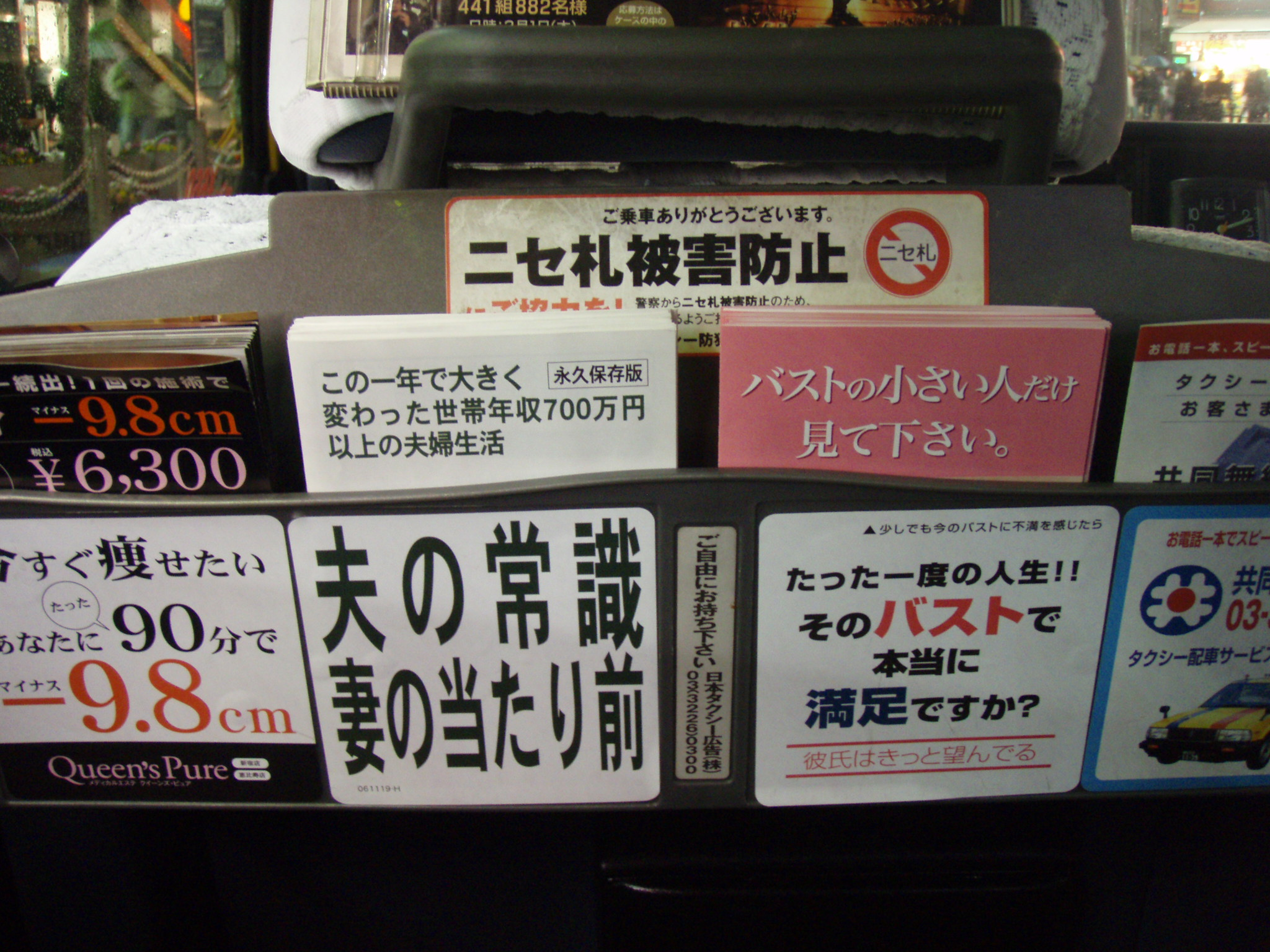
Advertising pamphlets in a taxi, 2007.

Rideshare advertising is a form of digital, out-of-home advertising that uses in-car advertisements in ridesharing vehicles.

== Technology ==
Rideshare advertising can refer to digital display screens placed in the back of vehicles, as well as exterior car wraps and displays, snack boxes, and more. Drivers contract with rideshare advertising companies, and ad displays are controlled by the rideshare advertising company. James Bellefeuille, founder of Vugo, coined the term "Rideshare Advertising." As independent contractors, rideshare drivers have full control over the display of games, advertisements, and decorations inside their cars, paving the way for companies to purchase this ad inventory. In-car rideshare advertising companies serve ad impressions to a group of consumers that is typically younger and maintains a higher disposable income. Rideshare advertising companies such as Halo and Firefly have also found success focusing on exterior advertisements, drumming up support from investors and touting increased earnings for drivers. Most rideshare advertising companies use geotargeting to display relevant ads to the riders in the cars.

== Reception ==
Some rideshare companies, such as Uber, initially disapproved of rideshare advertising companies, claiming that it did not add to the value of passenger experience. More recently, however, Uber has partnered with rideshare advertising brand, Cargo, a company that provides both free samples and items for purchase to rideshare drivers, who then distribute these products to their passengers. This partnership signals a shift towards the growing advertising industry, which comes in the wake of growing discontentment from drivers whose rising complaints of lower wages and job security reached a fever pitch as Uber and Lyft announced and completed their respective IPOs. Drivers have expressed support for the opportunity to earn additional income from a variety of sources, with some drivers even going so far as to manipulate surge pricing.

== See also ==
- Criticism of advertising
- Marketing
- Out-of-home advertising
