= David Risher =

American businessman, CEO of Lyft

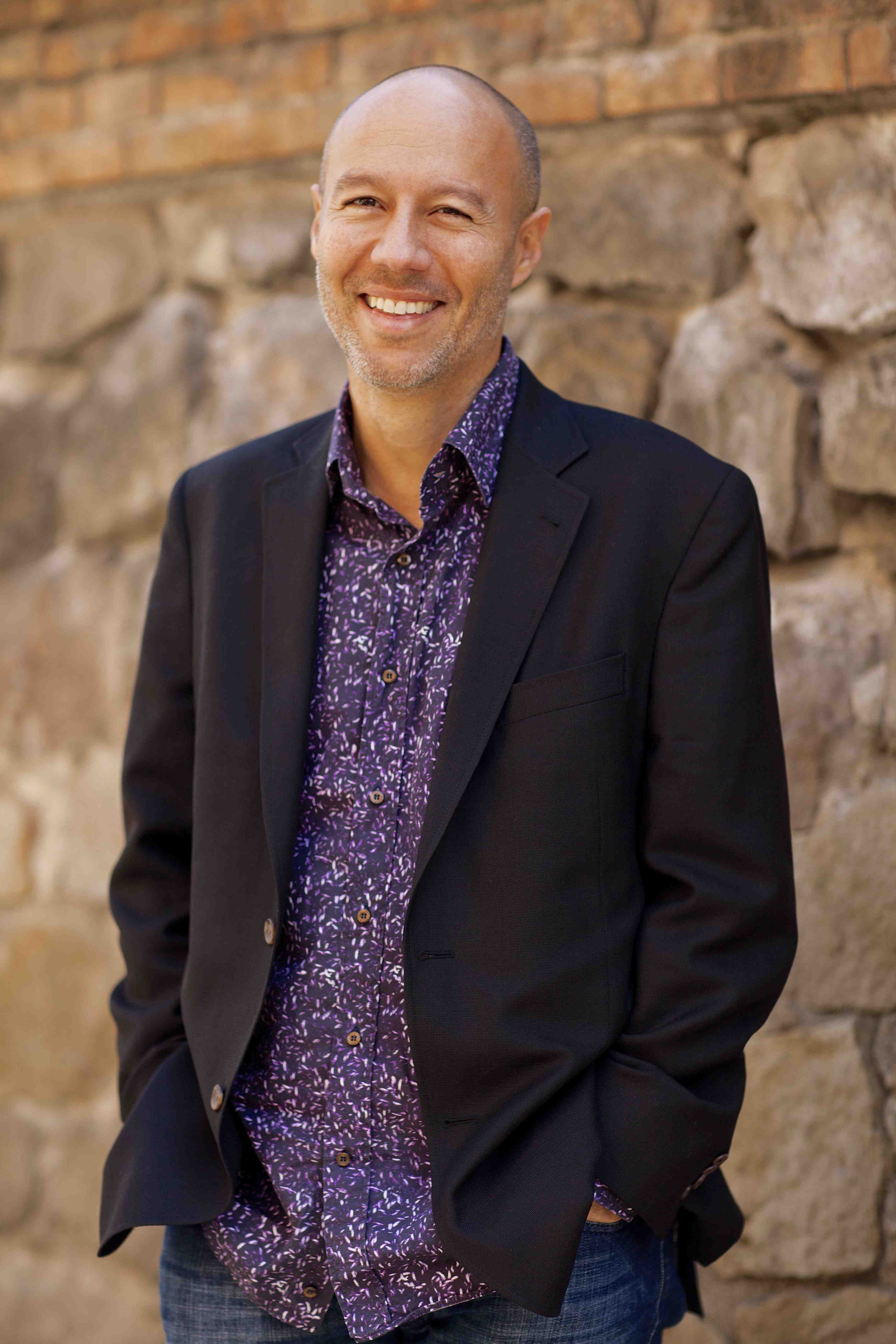
- Risher in 2012
- Born: July 15, 1965 (age 61); Washington, DC
- Education: Princeton University (BA); Harvard University (MBA)
- Occupation: CEO of Lyft
- Known for: Co-founder and CEO of Worldreader
- Parents: John R. Risher Jr. (father); Sarah Walker Risher (mother)

John David Risher (born July 15, 1965) is an American businessman and philanthropist. He is the CEO of Lyft, co-founder of Worldreader, a non-profit organization that aims to get children reading with their families so they can reach their potential.

Risher served as an executive at Microsoft Corporation, and was Senior Vice President of US Retail at Amazon.com from 1997 to 2002. In November 2009, together with Colin McElwee, he founded Worldreader. Risher succeeded Lyft co-founder Logan Green as its CEO in April 2023.

== Early life and background ==
Risher was raised by his divorced parents, living primarily with his mother in Chevy Chase, Maryland.

In 1987 he graduated from Princeton University, where he majored in Comparative Literature and wrote his thesis on “The Changing Attitudes towards Language in Samuel Beckett's early Metafiction.”

After graduating from college, he worked at L.E.K. Consulting, He bicycled across the United States before entering Harvard Business School, from which he graduated in 1991 with an MBA.

== Career ==
At Microsoft, Risher was General Manager in charge of launching the company's first database product, Access. He went on to found and manage Microsoft Investor. In 1997, he left Microsoft over Bill Gates' objections to join Amazon.com as its first Vice President of Product and Store development. He later served as the company's Senior Vice President, US Retail, leading the marketing and expanding into new categories to grow Amazon's retail sales from $15 million to $4 billion. As a tribute to Risher's leadership, Jeff Bezos created a hidden perpetual "easter egg" on the Amazon website when he left the company.

After leaving Amazon in 2002, Risher taught at the University of Washington's Foster Business School, where he created the University's course on “Competing on the Internet.” He was elected Professor of the Year in 2004.

Risher co-founded Worldreader after a year-long, 19-country trip around the world with his family, road-schooling his daughters and volunteering. After visiting an orphanage in Ecuador, Risher saw how technology could help traditionally underserved children read.

Worldreader is a US-based 501(c)(3) with an additional registration in Kenya. Worldreader believes that “readers build a better world" and uses digital technology to get families with young children reading so they can reach their potential. In March 2010, Worldreader launched a trial in Ayenyah, Ghana. Worldreader reports that, after receiving positive results, they were granted permission from Ghana's Ministry of Education to distribute e-readers to additional schools in Ghana. Since then, the organization has helped over 20 million readers in the United States and globally across more than 100 countries. Worldreader's BookSmart reading app offers children books and learning activities in six languages.

Risher joined the board of Lyft in July 2021 and was appointed chief executive officer in April 2023. His approach has been to use customer obsession to drive profitable growth. Lyft has achieved profitability, authorized its first share-repurchase program (US$750 million), and acquired the European mobility app FREENOW as part of an effort to expand internationally and nearly double its addressable market.

Risher has said that Lyft aims to move away from reliance on surge-pricing (“Prime Time”) by increasing driver supply, improving service metrics, and expanding fixed-price options such as Price Lock, calling surge pricing “deeply unpopular” with riders. He has also discussed the company’s approach to autonomous vehicles, describing a hybrid network that combines human drivers and robotaxis rather than a full transition to driverless fleets.

Risher is Schwab Foundation Social Entrepreneur of the year, a Microsoft Alumni Foundation Integral Fellow, and Draper Richards Kaplan Foundation Social Entrepreneur. He serves on the board of directors of Lyft, Inc and has served on the International Advisory Board of ESADE, and International Advisory Board of Catalunya.

== Philanthropy ==
In May 2020, Risher and his wife, author Jennifer Risher, created the HalfMyDAF challenge. Within 24 hours of the challenge's launch, donors had committed over $400,000 to support non-profits; within three months, over $4.7 million had been granted, with the total reaching $8.6 million by the end of 2020. As of the end of 2024, the organization had awarded and inspired over $90 million of charitable giving.

Risher is Worldreader's Founding Board Chair and previously served on the board of directors of the Barbara Bush Foundation for Family Literacy.

== Recognition ==
- One of Silicon Valley's 25 Most Influential People
- Honorary Doctor of Letters, Wilson College
- Draper Richards Kaplan Social Entrepreneur
- Clinton Global Initiative 2014 Invited Member
- Microsoft Alumni Foundation Integral Fellow 2011
- Publishers Weekly's “Eleven for the Millennium
- Schwab Foundation's Social Entrepreneur of the Year
- Robb Report Maverick Philanthropist
