= Worldreader =

- Founded: 2010; 16 years ago
- Founder: David Risher, Colin McElwee
- Type: Non-governmental organization
- Purpose: Worldreader gets children reading so they can reach their potential.
- Location: Seattle, Washington
- Region served: Africa, Asia, South America, United States
- Chief Executive Officer: Rebecca Chandler Leege
- Key people: Rebecca Chandler Leege, CEO;
- Employees: 50
- Website: https://www.worldreader.org

Worldreader is a 501(c)(3) global nonprofit organization working with partners to get children reading at least 25 books a year with understanding.

Since 2010, Worldreader has supported more than 22 million readers in over 100 countries. Worldreader's BookSmart experience provides children the tools they need to build their reading skills through locally relevant books, activities that reinforce reading, and where they are celebrated for their reading success.

The organization is headquartered in Seattle, Washington and has programmatic operations in Kenya and the United States.

== Approach for Impact ==
Worldreader works with families, caregivers, and their children on a digital reading journey that improves children’s reading understanding, emotional intelligence, and digital literacy skills. Worldreader supports the reading of children ages 3–12, utilizing an ABCDE approach.

- Apps. BookSmart, available on Android, iOS, and KaiOS, works across digital devices including smartphones, feature phones, tablets, computers, and Chromebooks. BookSmart app, available on Google's Play Store and Apple App Store. has also been widely distributed on MTN, Reliance Jio, Moya and other mobile operators.
- Books. Thousands of high-quality digital books from around the world in multiple languages (Arabic, English, Hindi, Kiswahili and Spanish).
- Capacity building. Training for caregivers, educators, and reading champions within the community so they feel confident about reading to and with children.
- Data. Collect real-time reading data and share it with caregivers/partners to continuously help them get more children reading.
- Engagement. Behavior change strategies deployed to create a new culture of reading in the home and beyond.

Worldreader's focus on digital reading allows it to reach larger portions of society more cost-effectively than traditional physical book reading programs, offering a personalized and engaging reading experience for children while providing actionable feedback to readers and data to partners and funders. Their free reading app BookSmart can be accessed on most devices, including computers, tablets, mobile phones, feature phones, and Chromebooks.

== Digital Library ==
With over 3,000 titles and several local and major languages (including Arabic, English, Hindi, Kiswahili, and Spanish), Worldreader's digital library includes a range of reading materials for children aged 3–12. The library includes general stories and special collections including Women in Sports, Climate Change, Social Entrepreneurship, STEAM, Racial Justice, Diversity, Equity and Inclusion, Gender Equality, and more.

Worldreader partners with local (e.g. Tulika Publishers, Moran Publishers, Malabares, East African Educational Publisher) and international publishers like Penguin Random House, Highlights, and HarperCollins.

== Impact and Partnerships ==
Worldreader works with and through partners closely to provide the tools, training, and resources families need to help children experience the love of reading while developing foundational literacy and life skills.

=== US Impact and Partnerships ===
Worldreader works in under-resourced communities across the United States (Atlanta, Chicago, San Francisco/Bay Area, North Carolina, West Virginia, and the Texas border). With an array of partners including community-based partners, school districts (e.g. Elgin School District), after school program providers (e.g. KidReach), affordable housing (e.g. Enterprise Communities), and health centers (e.g. Ravenswood Medical Center), Worldreader and its partners seek to spur innovation in their approaches to reaching children.

Worldreader and Atlanta Habitat for Humanity introduced a new way for future homeowners to put sweat equity/community hours into their homes by completing reading hours with their children using BookSmart. The Barbara Bush Family Literacy Foundation and Worldreader empower adult caregivers to strengthen their personal literacy skills while gaining confidence to enhance and support their children's education.

=== Global Impact and Partnerships ===
Worldreader's global impact draws from its partnerships across its geographies of operations and its reach across the world. With current operations in East Africa and previous operations in India, the Middle East/North Africa, West Africa, and Peru, it works with local community-based organizations, international non-governmental organizations, ministries of education and the private sector.

The use of partnerships has allowed Worldreader to engage with institutions and organizations that service pre- and primary age children. From community-based organizations (e.g. SARD, Achievers Ghana), to social entreprises (e.g. Kidogo) and non-state affordable schools (e.g. National Independent School Alliance), it has reached children in and out of the classroom setting.

International non-governmental organizations, CARE, World Vision also anchor its impact at the community level across multiple geographies including Sierra Leone, Egypt, Ghana and Peru.

Partnerships with government sectors such as the National Teaching Council of the Ministry of Education Ghana, the National Book Trust in India, have provided Worldreader greater scale across administrative districts as evident in Kwaebibirem District, Ghana, and Moradabad, Uttar Pradesh, India.

== Research and Impact ==
Worldreader works with partners to build a base of evidence that expands the sector's understanding of how digital reading can improve children's education and social-emotional skills and find more effective ways to get children reading early and often.

In Ghana, the GPE-KIX-funded Teacher Professional Development at Scale (TPD@Scale) program developed in partnership with Open University and the Ghana National Teaching Council, is building the capacity for Ghanaian teachers and government education officials to build ICT-enabled teacher professional development approaches and technologies. To date, over 9,503 teachers have signed up for the TPD program and approximately 40% of teachers enrolled have completed the course, a very high number for this context. In addition, the iREAD 2 project funded by an All Children Reading grant from USAID, World Vision and AusAid, showed significant improvements in oral reading fluency, reading comprehension gains, significant impact among low-performing students and development of positive reading habits.

In Egypt, When COVID-19 forced schools in Egypt to close, CARE Egypt wanted to support children's learning outside the classroom. With BookSmart, CARE Egypt increased children's daily reading time to 23 minutes. By the end of the project, children had read over 20,000 pages with 99.6% of parents reporting reading more with their children.

In India, Worldreader and NISA motivated families to read on BookSmart for 75 days in celebration of India's independence by providing reading opportunities during the summer holidays. The 75-Day Reading Marathon saw over 8,000 parents and caregivers read with their children every day.

In Kenya, EdTech Hub studied how through Worldreader's BookSmart application, Kenyan schools are using technology to improve parent and carers’ engagement with literacy learning in young readers.

In Kenya and in collaboration with Open University in the UK, Worldreader introduced an implementation science approach and the use of PLAN, STUDY, DO, and ACT (PDSA) cycles to test creative solutions for improving reading outcomes in children in 2022 [1].

In Peru, GRADE 2021 external evaluation found in Worldreader's pilot cohort of 470 children read 1,814 books, for a total of 16 books read per day (7 books per student, on average over the length of the project) [4].

In Zambia, the 2019 GirlsRead! Program found girls in the e-reader arm scored significantly better than girls in the control arm on two basic literacy assessments as well as on the non-verbal reasoning assessment [3].

== Governance ==
Worldreader is organized as a 501(c)(3) charitable organization in the United States. It has been rated as a four-star charity on Charity Navigator and received a Guidestar Transparency Seal. In 2023, Worldreader received the Library of Congress Literacy Award – International Prize.

Its US Board of Directors consists of: Peter Spiro (Board Chair), David Risher (Founding Chair), Rebecca Chandler Leege, Kate James, Michael C. Jensen, Elizabeth Khuri Chandler, Rachel Klausner, and Prasanna Krishnan.

CEO Rebecca Chandler Leege leads the organization from Seattle, Washington. A mix of private social investors, corporate sponsors, and government agencies including USAID, GPE, EdTech Hub, have funded the organization.

It also is globally supported with registered boards in Kenya, Europe, and the United Kingdom.

The Kenya Board of Directors: Zahra Kassam (Board Chair), Rebecca Chandler Leege, and Sejal Shah.

The Europe Board of Directors: Jonathan Wareham (Board President), Clara Barreneche, Adriana Brassart, Kami Dar, Antonio Delgado Planas. In Spain, the organization operates as a registered non-profit foundation validated by the Ministry of Education with registration number 1361.

The UK Board of Directors: Hermione Ireland (Board Chair), Rebecca Chandler Leege, Lucia Halpern, Peter Mallinson, Martin Nye, and David Risher.
