= Summon (company) =

American vehicle for hire company

- Industry: Transportation
- Founded: January 2012; 14 years ago
- Founder: Aarjav Trivedi
- Defunct: November 2014; 11 years ago
- Headquarters: San Francisco, California, United States
- Area served: San Francisco, California, United States
- Services: Vehicle for hire
- Website: blog.summon.com

Summon (originally InstantCab) was a vehicle for hire company operating in portions of Silicon Valley. The company was shut down in November 2014.

Customers were able to pay with Google Wallet.

== History ==
The idea for Summon came after Aarjav Trivedi, its CEO and Founder, waited for over an hour for a bus and then a cab to take him to the airport. He missed an international flight because both were late. Trivedi created InstantCab (later rebranded as Summon) to give people a simple, fast, reliable, and inexpensive form of transportation. Previously, Trivedi founded RideCell which focused on fleet automation to making on-demand transportation fleets easier to manage and access.

Summon was selected to participate in the Winter 2012 Y Combinator meet. Summon received funding in 2012 from venture capital and angel investors in Silicon Valley including Khosla Ventures, Redpoint Ventures, General Catalyst, Andreessen Horowitz, Facebook Ex-COO Owen Van Natta and Delicious founder Joshua Schachter.

In February 2014, after rebranding from InstantCab to Summon, the company raised another round of funding from existing investors and new investors such as BMW Ventures.

The company pioneered many firsts, including being the first one to enable Drivers without cars to access fleet vehicles from Leasing and Rental companies (BMW's DriveNow carsharing service), the first one to use Electric Cars (also from DriveNow), to enable access to health insurance for ridesharing drivers, to offer drivers extra pay to transport disabled passengers, to feature women drivers, and to offer drivers same-day deposits and a swiper with low credit card fees.

In 2016, Summon pivoted to empower mobility leaders using the internal platform they had built as an intelligent "operating system" for leasing, automotive finance & mobility businesses. Their customers include Merchants Fleet, BMW, Arval by BNP Paribas, and Toyota

== Drivers ==
Taxi drivers were able to sign up to drive for Summon. Taxi drivers were able to get a credit card swiper from Summon for use with street hails or non-Summon customers.

== Surge pricing ==
Summon opposed a dynamic pricing model. Instead of surge pricing, Summon used flat fares on busy times and event days. In addition, it offers a FareBack program, which gives customers a portion of their ride cost back as credits to use on future Summon rides.

== Regulatory issues ==
On March 8, 2013, Summon received a cease and desist letter from San Francisco International Airport, claiming that its community drivers were trespassing by unlawfully conducting business operations on airport property without a permit. Summon responded that its personal drivers were complying with the law because they were not picking up customers at the airport or engaging in commercial activities on airport property. Other vehicle for hire companies operating in San Francisco also received similar cease and desist letters from San Francisco International Airport.

In September 2013, the California Public Utilities Commission legalized vehicle for hire companies. Summon was the first ridesharing company to receive its operating permit from the California Public Utilities Commission, which it received on February 24, 2014.
