= John R. Risher =

American lawyer (1938–1999)

John Risher

Corporation Counsel of the District of Columbia
- In office 1976–1978
- Mayor: Walter Washington
- Preceded by: Francis Murphy
- Succeeded by: Louis Robbins (acting)

Personal details
- Born: John Robert Risher Jr. September 23, 1938 Washington, D.C., U.S.
- Died: February 21, 1999 (aged 60) Washington, D.C., U.S.
- Party: Democratic
- Education: Morgan State University (BA); University of Southern California (LLB)

John Robert Risher Jr. (September 23, 1938 – February 21, 1999) was an attorney who served, from 1976 until June 1978, as the first Corporation Counsel for Washington, D.C. appointed after it was granted Home Rule by the United States Congress.

Risher was born in Washington, the grandson of John Temple Risher, who, as chief of the muster roll section of the United States Navy during World War I, recruited the first Black women to serve in the Navy. Risher graduated from John Carroll High School in 1956, Morgan State College in 1960, and the University of Southern California law school in 1963. After a short tenure as an Army officer in Korea, he became an attorney with the federal government at the Equal Employment Opportunity Commission, then in the criminal fraud section of the Justice Department before being assigned to be a prosecutor in the office of the United States Attorney for the District of Columbia. Upon leaving federal service in 1968, Risher joined Arent Fox in 1968 as a civil litigator. In 1973, he became the second or third African-American ever to become a partner in one of the 50 largest law firms in the United States. He served as partner of the firm, specializing in civil litigation and dealings with the District government, from 1973 until his death, except for his tenure in government.

Risher also taught as an adjunct professor at the Georgetown University Law Center and Howard University Law School and served as a trustee of the Supreme Court Historical Society and as the first president of the newly reconstituted District of Columbia Jewish Community Center.

== Personal life ==
Risher married Sarah Walker and they had two sons, David and Michael. After their divorce, he married Carol Seeger and they had two sons, Mark and Conrad Zachary.

Legal offices
Preceded by Francis Murphy	Corporation Counsel of the District of Columbia; 1976–1978	Succeeded by Louis Robbins; Acting
