= Parag Agrawal =

Former CEO of Twitter (born 1984)

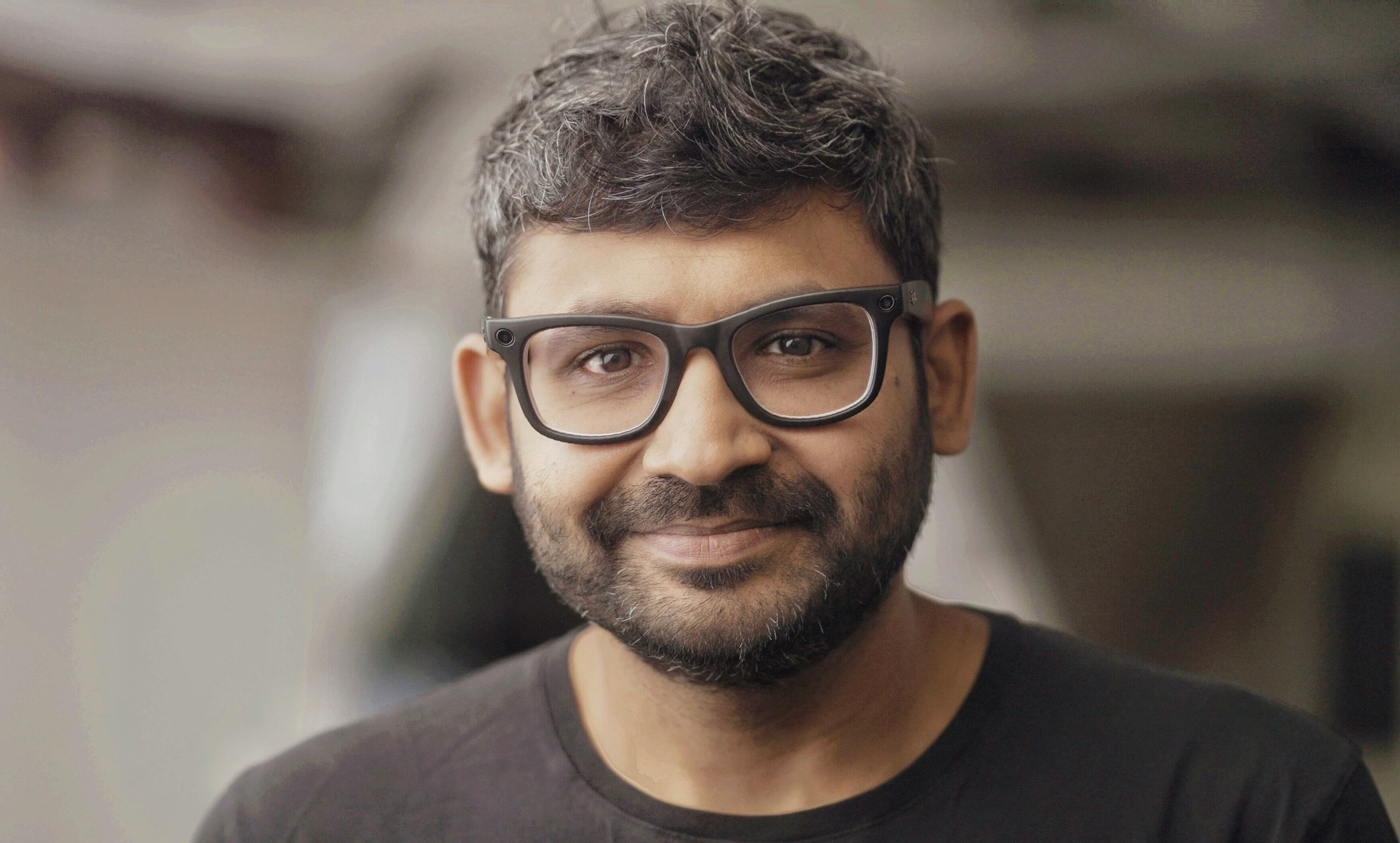
- Agrawal in 2025
- Born: 21 May 1984 (age 42); Ajmer, Rajasthan, India
- Education: Indian Institute of Technology, Bombay (BTech); Stanford University (MS, PhD)
- Occupations: Software engineer; businessman
- Known for: Former CEO, Twitter, Inc.
- Predecessor: Jack Dorsey
- Successor: Elon Musk
- Spouse: Vineeta Agarwala
- Children: 2

Parag Agrawal (Hindi pronunciation: [pəˈɾaːɡ əɡɾəˈʋaːl]; born 21 May 1984) is an Indian software engineer and businessman who was the CEO of Twitter, Inc. from November 2021 to October 2022.

== Early life and education ==
Agrawal was born in Ajmer, Rajasthan. His father was a senior official in the Indian Department of Atomic Energy and his mother is a retired Economics professor from Veermata Jijabai Technological Institute in Mumbai.

He completed his Class 10 at Atomic Energy Central School No.4 and in 2001, he completed his Class 12 at Atomic Energy Junior College, Mumbai. In the same year, he secured a gold medal in the International Physics Olympiad held in Antalya, Turkey.

In 2005, Agrawal obtained his BTech degree in Computer Science and Engineering from IIT Bombay. That year, he moved to the United States to pursue a PhD in computer science at Stanford University under the guidance of Jennifer Widom. His Stanford doctoral thesis, published in 2012, is titled "Incorporating Uncertainty in Data Management and Integration".

== Career ==
Agrawal held research internships at Microsoft Research and Yahoo! Research before joining Twitter as a software engineer in 2011. In October 2017, Twitter announced the appointment of Agrawal as chief technology officer following the departure of Adam Messinger. In December 2019, Twitter CEO Jack Dorsey announced that Agrawal would be in charge of Project Bluesky, an initiative to develop a decentralized social network protocol which later became the Bluesky social media app and accompanying AT Protocol.

In an interview discussing the rise of misinformation on Twitter with MIT Technology Review in November 2020, while still Twitter CTO, when asked about freedom of speech regarding Twitter, Agrawal said: "Our role is not to be bound by the First Amendment, but our role is to serve a healthy public conversation ... [and to] focus less on thinking about free speech, but thinking about how the times have changed."

On November 29, 2021, Dorsey announced that he was resigning as CEO of Twitter and that Agrawal was replacing him immediately. As CEO, Agrawal was awarded annual compensation of $1 million as well as stock compensation worth $12.5 million. Agrawal was fired as CEO once Elon Musk completed his acquisition of the company on October 27, 2022.

Post-Twitter, Agrawal founded an artificial intelligence startup called Parallel Web Systems, which focuses on building infrastructure for artificial intelligence agents to interact with the web at scale. The company received $30 million in funding from Khosla Ventures, Index Ventures, and First Round Capital.

In April 2026, Parallel Web Systems raised $100 million in Series B funding, led by Sequoia Capital and valuing the company at $2 billion.

== Personal life ==
Parag Agrawal was born in Ajmer, Rajasthan into a Jain family. He is married to Vineeta Agarwala, general partner at the venture capital firm Andreessen Horowitz, where she focuses on investments in biotech and health tech. They have two children, and reside in San Francisco.
