= Parallel Web Systems =

Artificial intelligence company

- Type: Private
- Industry: Artificial intelligence
- Founded: 2023; 3 years ago
- Founders: Parag Agrawal; Travers Nisbet
- Headquarters: Palo Alto, California, U.S.
- Key people: Parag Agrawal (CEO)
- Products: Web search and research APIs; Index
- Website: parallel.ai

Parallel Web Systems is an American artificial intelligence infrastructure company headquartered in Palo Alto, California. The company develops application programming interfaces (APIs) and a web index designed for use by AI agents rather than human users.

== History ==
Parallel Web Systems was co-founded in 2023 by Parag Agrawal, the former chief executive officer of Twitter (now X), and Travers Nisbet.

The company raised a $30 million seed round in January 2024 with participation from Khosla Ventures, First Round Capital, Index Ventures and Terrain. Parallel launched its first commercial products in August 2025.

In November 2025, the company announced a $100 million Series A funding round co-led by Kleiner Perkins and Index Ventures, at a valuation of $740 million. In April 2026, Parallel raised a $100 million Series B led by Sequoia Capital, with participation from Kleiner Perkins, Index Ventures, Khosla Ventures, First Round Capital, Spark Capital, and Terrain Capital, bringing the company to a $2 billion valuation and $230 million in total funding to date.

== Products ==
Parallel offers a set of web search and research APIs intended for use by AI agents. The company's stated approach is to return information-dense content excerpts—optimized for inclusion in a large language model's context window—rather than ranked lists of links of the kind returned by general-purpose web search engines.

The company has publicly named customers including Harvey, Notion, Opendoor, Granola, and Dropbox, and states that more than 100,000 developers use its products.

=== Index ===
In May 2026, Parallel launched Index, a platform that allows content owners to monitor how AI agents use their material and receive compensation based on factors such as impressions, citations, uniqueness, and the value of the task an AI agent completes. The system applies a measurement model derived from the Shapley value concept in cooperative game theory to estimate each source's contribution to an agent's output.

Announced launch partners included The Atlantic, Fortune, PR Newswire, Enigma, Fiscal AI, PitchBook, RocketReach, Tracxn, and ZoomInfo, along with several independent writers and newsletter publishers.
