= Vugo (company) =

Software company developing rideshare advertising platform, based in Minneapolis

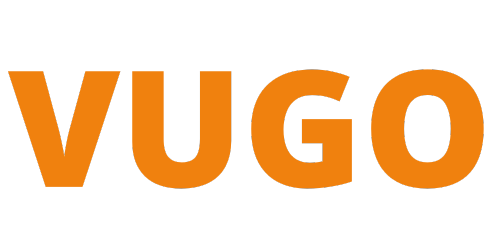
- Formerly: Viewswagen
- Type: Private
- Industry: Application software, Rideshare advertising
- Founded: Minneapolis, Minnesota (2015)
- Founder: James Bellefeuille; Rob Flessner; Eugene Kurdzesau
- Headquarters: Minneapolis, Minnesota, United States
- Area served: United States
- Key people: James Bellefeuille; Rob Flessner; Eugene Kurdzesau
- Website: govugo.com

Vugo is a rideshare advertising company that markets ads on billboards on top of vehicles for hire. Headquartered in Minneapolis, Minnesota, the company is the first to develop in-car advertising for the rideshare marketplace.

== History ==
Vugo was founded in February 2015 by James Bellefeuille, Rob Flessner and Eugene Kurdzesau, all University of St. Thomas graduates. The initial idea for the application came when co-founder James Bellefeuille worked as a driver for Uber in Chicago. An owner of one of his favorite restaurants suggested that he carry menus in his car while ridesharing, Soon after adding the menus to the pockets to the backseat, Bellefeuille noticed that passengers who previously asked for recommendations actually took action on his advice when presented with a menu. The business is headquartered in Minneapolis, Minnesota and was originally named Viewswagen prior to its name change to Vugo.

Vugo was beta tested in the Minneapolis-Minnesota area prior to it launch in May 2015. By June of that year, Vugo had signed up over 1,000 drivers. Vugo first met with resistance from Uber, which threatened to deactivate drivers partnered with Vugo, stating that rideshare advertising did not enhance a client's ride. Bellefeuille responded in an interview saying, "We took a page from the Uber playbook...We’re going to do it anyway." When asked by a reporter, Uber responded that its support staff was incorrect and drivers are considered independent contractors and not employees of the company. In result, drivers would not be deactivated for advertising with Vugo. Vugo raised $250,000 in angel funding which it closed in June 2015.

The New York City Taxi and Limousine Commission had previously barred drivers from using screens for advertising. In 2015, Vugo filed a lawsuit in federal court to overturn the ban. In 2018, the court ruled that the Taxi and Limousine Commission cannot ban the technology. Vugo subsequently signed agreements with approximately 3,500 drivers in New York City to install its technology. New York City became only the fourth location to use video advertising screens, joining Saudi Arabia, Singapore, and one town in Mexico.

Vugo was also among the 70 semi-finalists in the 2015 Minnesota Cup. As of June 2015, Vugo claimed almost 1,200 drivers on its platform.

== Ad platform ==
Vugo's application displays advertisements on a tablet in real time, based on a passenger’s estimated intent. After the driver enters the passenger's destination, the application, taking into account route and time of day, uses an algorithm to display advertisements relevant to the passenger, reducing the possibility of irrelevant advertisements. The application targeted all vehicle for hire companies. Vugo claimed that drivers using its application could make more than $6,000 per year, with the advertising revenue from the application distributed by the company to the driver.

== Vugo, Inc. v. City of New York ==
In February 2018, Vugo successfully sued the city of New York, reversing the policy of the New York City Taxi and Limousine Commission to ban advertising in vehicles for hire. The ruling was reversed by the 2nd U.S. Circuit Court of Appeals in July 2019.

== See also ==
- Rideshare advertising
