= Sacramento Metropolitan Cable Television Commission =

The Sacramento Metropolitan Cable Television Commission is the joint powers agency responsible for regulating the cable television franchises and licenses in Sacramento County, California. The Commission's Board of Directors is composed of members of the constituent jurisdictions: Sacramento County, Sacramento, Citrus Heights, Elk Grove, Rancho Cordova, Folsom, and Galt.

== Formal responsibilities ==
The Commission is responsible for:

- Administering the cable television franchises and licenses in Sacramento County
- Assisting consumers in resolving their cable and non-cable video concerns
- Monitoring community programming and grantee funding
- Operating the local Government-access television (GATV) cable TV channel, Metro Cable

== Franchises ==
The Commission currently licenses four cable television providers:

- Comcast throughout Sacramento County
- Frontier Communications in Elk Grove
- Strategic Technologies in Natomas
- SureWest in Natomas, Arden, Carmichael, Fair Oaks, Sacramento, Citrus Heights, Oak Park, Antelope, Elk Grove, and LandPark.

== Late fees case ==
On March 23, 1993, Sacramento Cable instituted a $5 late fee on cable bills. These fees soon became the most common subject of complaint received by the Commission.

On July 25, 1994 a major class action suit (Selnick v. Sacramento Cable) was initiated over the legality of these late fees, which it was contended violated California law. This suit grew out of the Commission's investigation into the issue. The case was settled, and new legislation on late fees was drafted.
