= Logan Green =

American entrepreneur

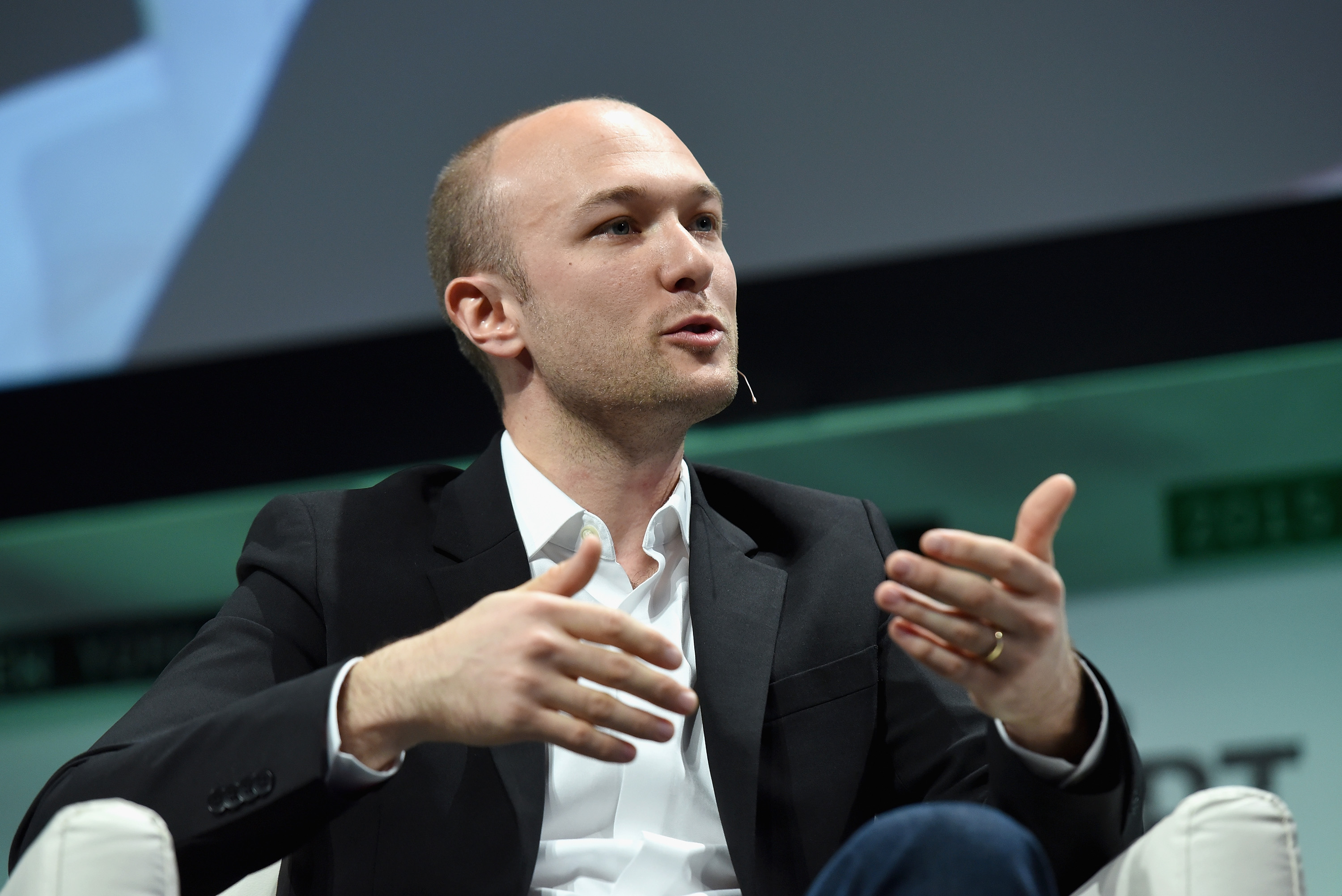
- Green at TechCrunch Disrupt in New York, 2015
- Born: Logan D. Green; 1983 or 1984 (age 42–43)
- Education: University of California, Santa Barbara (BA)
- Occupations: Co-founder and chairman of Lyft
- Spouse: Eva Green

Logan D. Green (born 1983 or 1984) is the former chairman and CEO of Lyft, which he co-founded with John Zimmer in 2012. Lyft grew out of Zimride, a rideshare company previously founded by the duo in 2007.

As of October 2017, Lyft is available in all 50 United States and in Toronto.

== Early life and education ==
Green attended New Roads High School in Santa Monica, California. He graduated from the University of California, Santa Barbara (UCSB) in 2006 with a B.A. in Business Economics. While a student, Green created The Green Initiative Fund, served as a board member for the Isla Vista Recreation and Park District, and was the youngest director for the Santa Barbara Metropolitan Transit District. From August 2007 to February 2008, Green was the Sustainability Director at UCSB. In 2007, alongside John Zimmer, Green founded Zimride, a ride-sharing platform that coordinated carpools, especially across college campuses.

== Career ==
=== Inspiration ===
Green grew up in Los Angeles where he "spent most of [his] life stuck in traffic". Interested in solving transportation flaws, Green forced himself to travel around California without an automobile. While attending college in Santa Barbara, he used public transportation options like Greyhound and Amtrak to visit his girlfriend in Los Angeles. He also used Craigslist's ride boards for carpooling but always felt anxiety about not knowing the passenger or driver.

After realizing public transportation's limits, Green started a car-sharing program and asked Zipcar to place cars at UCSB. Because Zipcar only had 100 cars at the time and was based on the East Coast, it couldn't provide any vehicles. Instead, Green acquired several Toyota Prius cars, and other vehicles, and began a car-sharing program that let users unlock cars with radio-frequency identification. The program had over 2,000 people on campus sharing four cars.

During college, Green also served on the Santa Barbara Metropolitan Transit District (MTD) board. During his time on the board, Green realized that large-scale changes to public opinion were needed to improve public transportation.

=== Zimride (2006–2013) ===
In 2006, Green was inspired by a post-college trip to Zimbabwe in which he saw locals using crowdsourced carpool networks for transportation. Using the Facebook API, he developed a platform that allowed users to find and plan carpools. He named his app Zimride in honor of Zimbabwe's carpooling network. Of the early versions of Zimride, Green said, "Public transportation is broken. We're trying to create the next form that works".

Green eventually met Zimmer when they were introduced through a mutual friend on Facebook. Green had posted details about his new company called Zimride, which interested Zimmer, who had been keeping a journal about carpooling ideas. Within a week of being introduced, Green flew out to New York City to meet with Zimmer.

Zimride launched the first version of its ride-share program at Cornell University where, after six months, the service had signed up 20% of the student body. Later in 2007, Zimride was active on both the Cornell and UCSB campuses. Green and Zimmer promoted the service through guerrilla marketing campaigns; in particular, the pair would dress in frog suits and hand out flyers to students on the Cornell campus.

Green and Zimmer moved to Silicon Valley to work on growing the company, sharing an apartment that doubled as their office. The two did not take a salary for three years.

In 2012, Green and Zimmer shifted the company's focus to their bigger mission of providing an alternative to car ownership. That year, the company launched a smartphone app that allowed users to request rides more frequently and for shorter commutes rather than long-distance trips as Zimride had previously done.

In May 2013, the company reincorporated as Lyft and sold Zimride to Enterprise Holdings.

=== Lyft (2013–present) ===
As of 2017, Green and Zimmer raised $4.1 billion dollars for Lyft, valuing the company at $11.5 billion. The company debuted on the Nasdaq exchange in March 2019, with a value of $24.3 billion.

In March 2023, Green announced that on April 17, he would step down as Lyft CEO and become chair of its board of directors.

== Recognition ==
In 2014, Green and Zimmer were named in Inc. Magazine's "35 Under 35 list".

== Personal life ==
He is married to Eva Gonda Green, daughter of Louis Gonda. He has four children.
