= John Zimmer =

Co-founder and president of Lyft

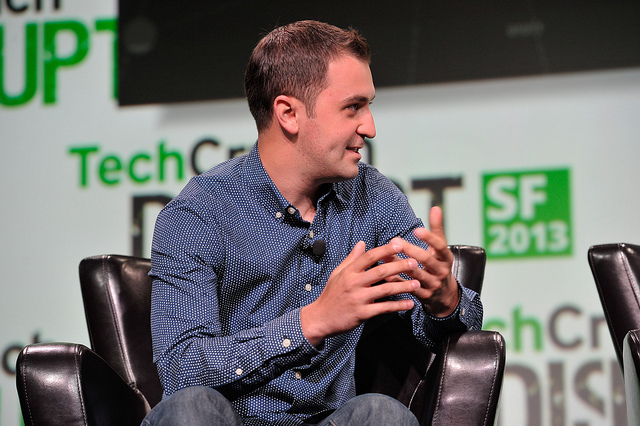
- Zimmer in TechCrunch Disrupt San Francisco 2013
- Born: March 14, 1984 (age 42)
- Citizenship: United States
- Education: Cornell University
- Occupations: Co-founder and President of Lyft
- Partner: Cristina García Rivas
- Children: 1
- Father: Larry Zimmer

John Zimmer is the co-founder and former president of Lyft, an on-demand transportation company, which he founded with Logan Green in 2012.

In March 2023, Zimmer announced that in June he would step down as Lyft president and become vice-chair of the board of directors.

== Early life and education ==
Zimmer grew up in Greenwich, Connecticut. In 2006, Zimmer graduated from Cornell University School of Hotel Administration where he was a member of Sigma Pi fraternity, Mu chapter. After graduation, Zimmer worked as an analyst in real estate finance at Lehman Brothers in New York City.

Zimmer left Lehman Brothers three months before it declared bankruptcy. In 2007, while Zimmer was working at Lehman Brothers, he and Logan Green founded Zimride, a ridesharing platform across college campuses.

== Zimride ==
While at Cornell, Zimmer was inspired to develop a rideshare program by filling the empty seats he had during his rides home over school breaks. Logan Green had also been thinking along those lines and had started "Zimride". Zimride launched the first version of its rideshare program at Cornell University where, after six months, the service had signed up 20% of the student body. Later in 2007, Zimride was active on both the Cornell and UCSB campuses.

Zimmer quit his job at Lehman Brothers to work with Green full-time on Zimride. Green and Zimmer focused the service on carpooling between connected users and making carpooling fun and interesting. By April 2012, the company was renamed Lyft and had raised $7.5 million in funding and was active at over 125 universities.

== Lyft ==
After leaving his job at Lehman Brothers, Zimmer moved to Silicon Valley with Green to work on Zimride full-time. Lyft was launched in the summer of 2012 as a service of Zimride, before Zimmer and Green officially changed the name of the company from Zimride to Lyft. Zimmer did not take a salary during the first three years of Lyft's operation, and he and Green worked on the company out of an apartment they shared.

== Personal life ==
Zimmer is married. He met his wife while studying abroad in Seville, Spain; they have a daughter.
