= Haxi =

Haxi Ltd.
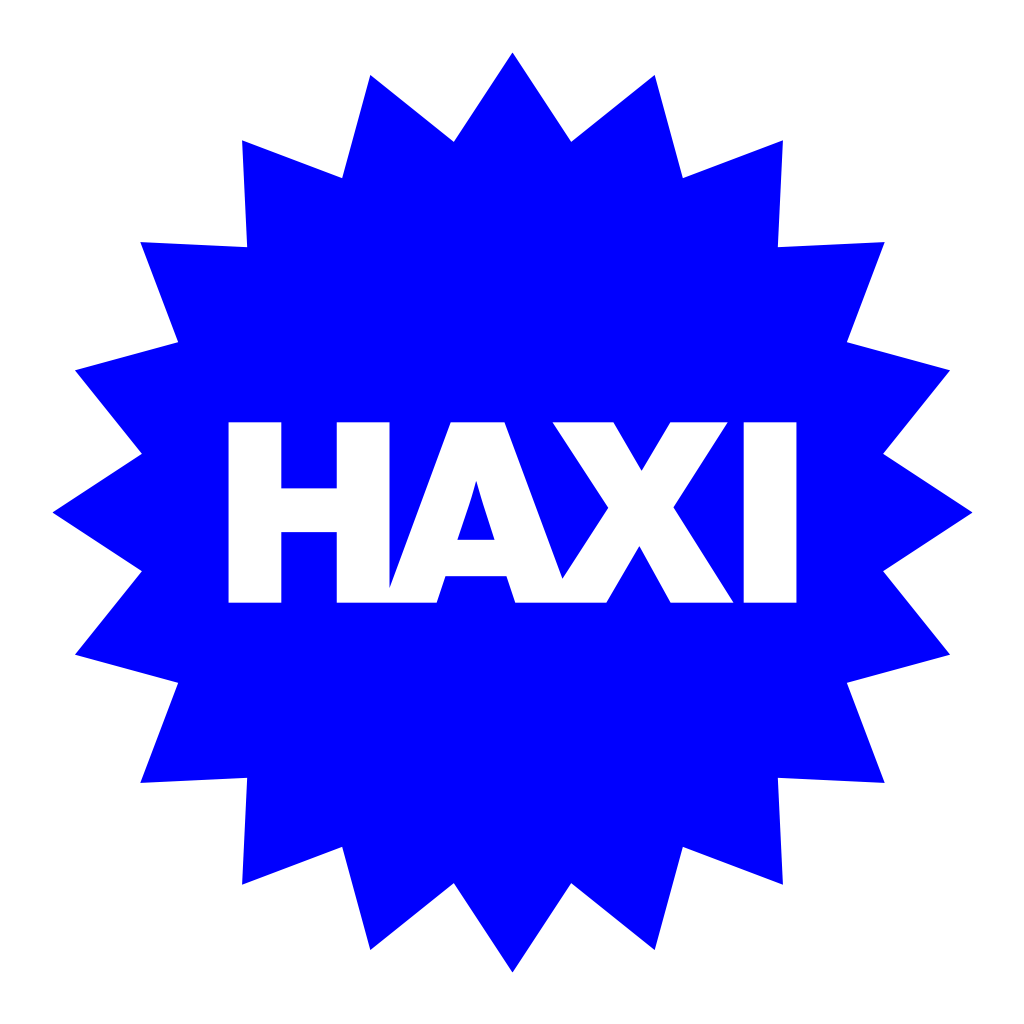
- Type: Private company
- Industry: Vehicle for hire, Sharing economy
- Founded: London, United Kingdom February 27, 2014; 12 years ago
- Founders: Aleksander Soender, CEO; Joonas Kirsebom; Robert Daniel Nagy; Simon Lund; Émile Sadria
- Headquarters: London, United Kingdom
- Products: Mobile app, Fashion accessory
- Website: haxiapp.com

Haxi Apps
- Original authors: Joonas Kirsebom, Simon Lund
- Release: 16 February 2014; 12 years ago
- Stable release: 1.12 / 11 July 2016; 9 years ago
- Written in: Java, Objective-C
- Operating system: Android, iOS
- Platform: Web, Android, iOS
- Size: 2.84 MB
- Available in: 5 languages
- List of languages English, Spanish, Swedish, Norwegian, Danish
- Type: App, instant messaging, Vehicle for hire, transportation
- Website: haxiapp.com

Haxi (stylized as HAXI) is a vehicle for hire company that enables users to share transport over short and mid range distances. The name is a portmanteau of "hack" and "taxi". Registered users can be drivers, passengers, or both. Drivers active for more than three days per month need an access pass or a subscription plan. Unregistered users cannot get contact details on other users. No registration is needed to logon. The firm's mobile application facilitates transportation by enabling passengers who need a ride to request one from available "community drivers."

== History ==
Haxi was incorporated by Aleksander Soender, Joonas Kirsebom and Robert Daniel Nagy in February 2014. The service was launched as a web app in Stavanger, Norway December 2013. Applications for Android and iPhone was released in March 2014. Haxi is available in English, Spanish, Norwegian, Swedish and Danish. The company is based in London, Great Britain. Angel investor funding for Haxi was secured in June 2014.

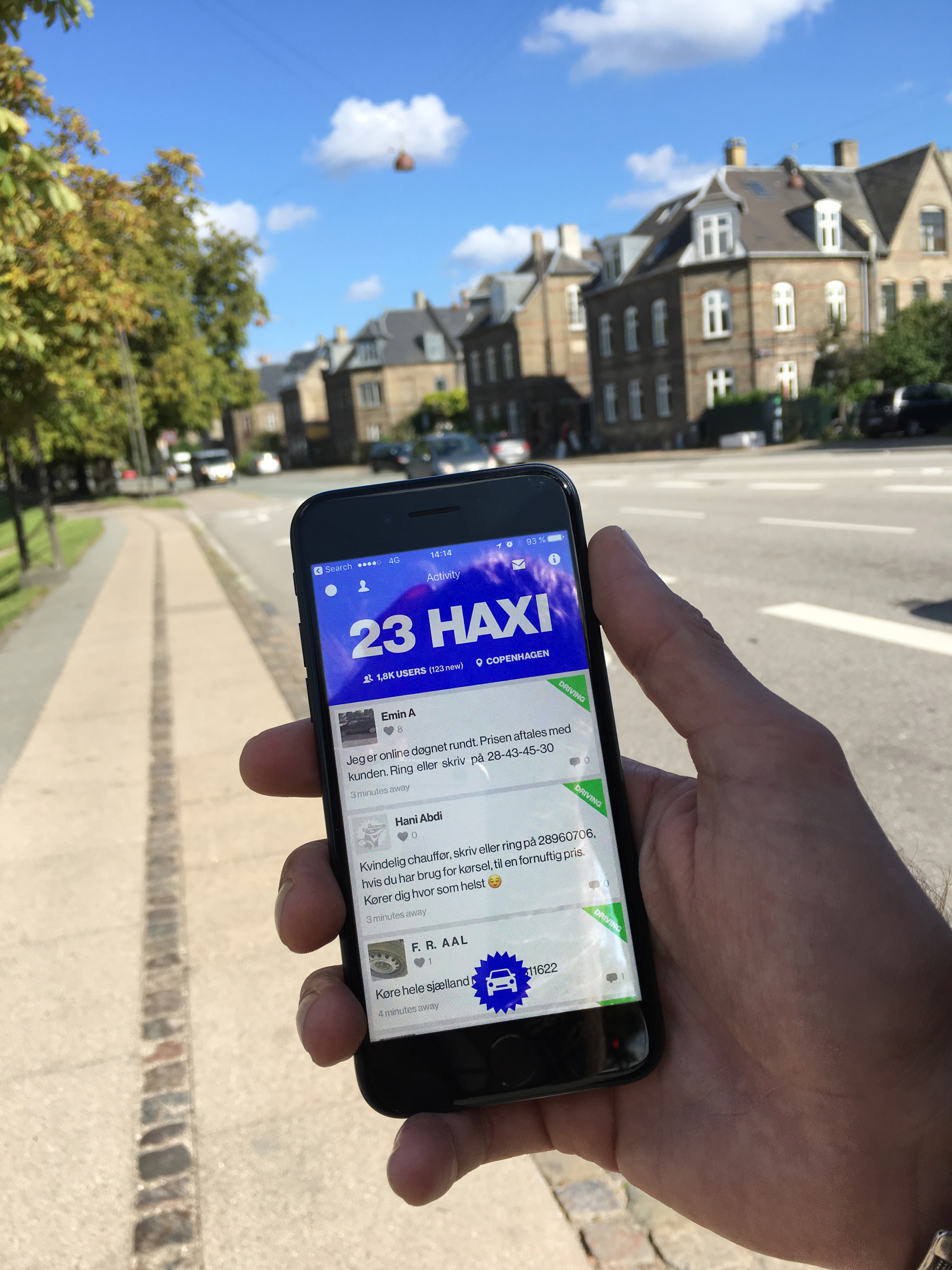
Ride hailing with Haxi

Since December 2013, Haxi has grown to the biggest ridesharing network in Norway. In June 2014, it was estimated that 11,000 Norwegians were using Haxi. By August 2014, that number has risen to 31,000 users with over 2,000 registered drivers in Norway alone.

In September 2014, Haxi surpassed 3,000 registered drivers, and has 42,000 users, with 72% using the app more than once. At this growth rate, Haxi is expected to become bigger than the whole Norwegian taxi force combined by December 2014. Haxi is mentioned as one of the most interesting companies in the ridesharing market Worldwide. In June 2014, Norwegian Taxi Association CEO, Lars Hjelmeng, estimated that ridesharing via Haxi and social media is generating up to one billion NOK (Norwegian Krone) annually. In March 2017 the total number of active drivers on Haxi passed the 10.000 mark in Scandinavia.

== Products ==
=== HaxiStar ===
The HaxiStar - Explorer Version is an electronic roof top sign and light designed by Lars Holme Larsen from Kilo Design in collaboration with Haxi. The lightning device is inspired by a mix of the traditional taxi top sign and gadgets like the Little Tree/Wunderbaum air freshener. It has multiple placement options; roof, dashboard, and rear mirror. The light is controlled by a simple remote control with two settings; pulsing for waiting and steady light for available. HaxiStar was tested among drivers in Norway and Denmark throughout 2016. Haxi drivers with a subscription plan get the HaxiStar device for free.

The HaxiStar lightning device for ridesharing

== Business Model ==
Haxi operates under a freemium business model (basic services are free, while additional features for drivers are offered via access passes and paid subscriptions). Haxi makes its revenues by selling access passes and subscriptions to drivers.

Paid products are currently only active within selected geographical areas.

=== Accounts and subscriptions ===
As of February 2018, the three Haxi access passes and subscription types, all offering unlimited access, are:

Products	Network access	Type
Free	3 days/month	Freemium
24hrs	24 hours + 3 days	Access pass
48hrs	48 hours + 3 days	Access pass
Monthly	Unlimited access	Subscription

== Controversy ==
=== Norway ===
Since Haxi officially launched in December 2013, there has been much media attention on the topic of illegal taxi operation in the Norwegian press.

On March 9, 2014, local taxi drivers drove two students from Stavanger to Copenhagen for free as a protest against Haxi.

On August 28, 2014, the Norwegian Taxi Association and taxi operator I-taxi notified the police about a Haxi user for unlicensed taxi operation. The case was later dropped by the police in Grimstad.

On October 7, 2014, the Norwegian Transport Worker Association notified the police in Oslo about Haxi for operating an unlicensed taxi operation. A week later, on October 13, 2014, the police in Oslo informed the Norwegian Transport Worker Association that the case against Haxi was dropped.

From September to November 2014, undercover agents from Stavanger Police booked several rides from Haxi drivers. In December 2014, investigators began to interview drivers and fine them for 8.000 NOK and three months confiscation of the car for breaking the Yrketransportlov. On December 17, 2014, Stavanger Police published a press release saying 3 of 8 Haxi users were official taxi drivers using the service for spontaneous ridesharing. Haxi advised all drivers to decline the fine and offered all drivers financial and legal support to test the case in court. Three Haxi drivers accepted this offer from Haxi and declined to pay the fines.

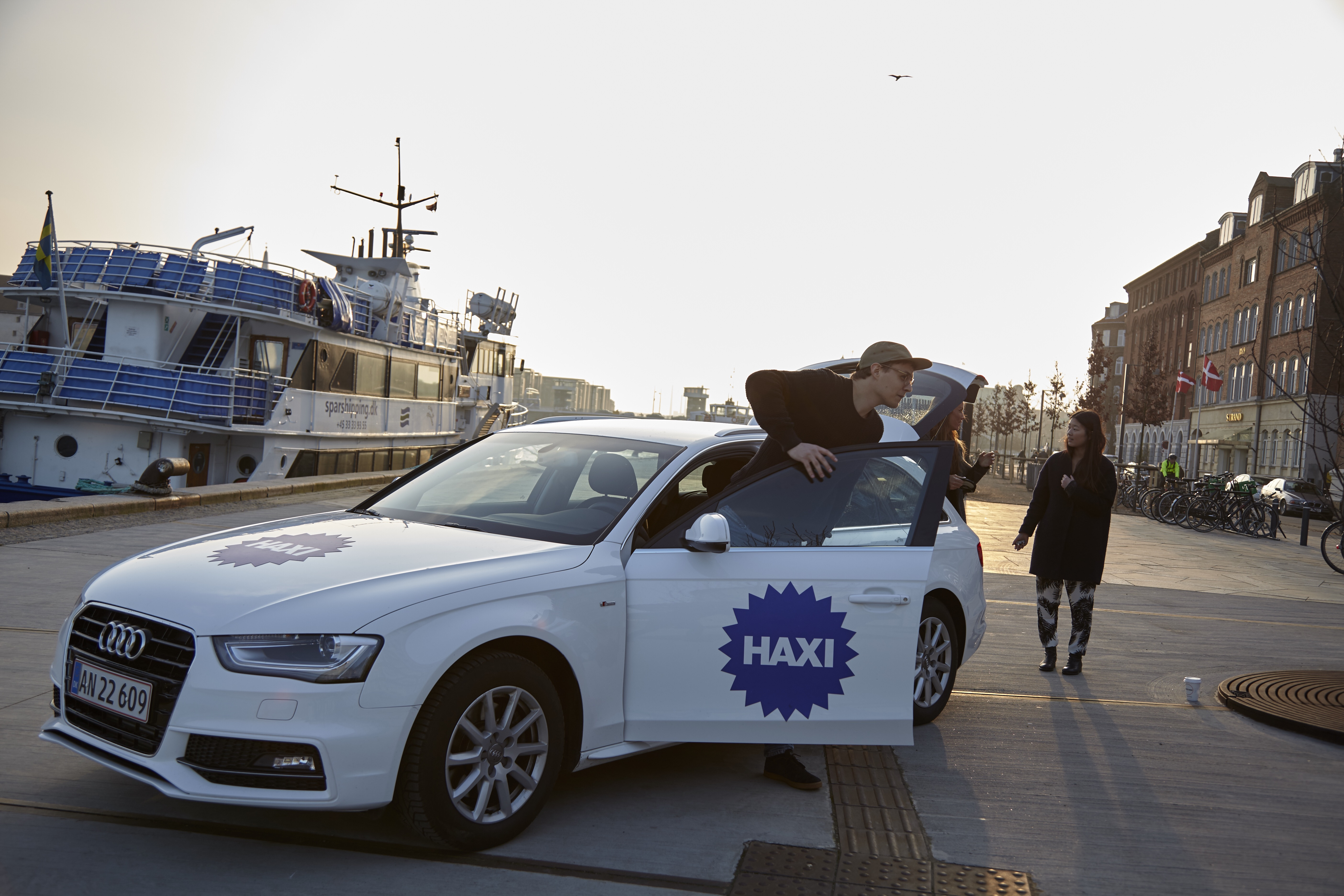
Haxi driver is picking up passengers in Copenhagen

On May 11, 2015, the trial started against three drivers from the Haxi community in the Stavanger District Court (Tingrett). The three drivers were granted legal aid by the judge because of the principle which is rare in administrative law cases. Main discussion points between the prosecutor, police lawyer, Stian Eskeland and the defendant Torbjørn Kolås Sognefest from Advokatfirmaet Elden were police entrapment, the taxi law Yrketransportloven, double jeopardy, and the definition of public space.

On May 20, 2015, the three Haxi drivers accused of breaking the Norwegian taxi law Yrketransportloven were acquitted by three concurring judges in the Stavanger District Court. Stavanger Police lost the case against the three Haxi drivers because prosecutor Stian Eskeland could not convince the judges that the Haxi app was part of public space. Spontaneous ridesharing via Haxi was announced legal in local media.

On June 2, 2015, the prosecutor Stian Eskeland from the Stavanger Police announced that they have appealed the acquittal of the three Haxi drivers to the Gulating Court of Appeal (Lagmannsrett).

On February 11, 2016, the appeal trial started in the Gulating Court of Appeal in Stavanger Norway against the three Haxi drivers who were acquitted by the Stavanger District Court in May 2015.

On February 15, 2016, the three Haxi drivers were acquitted by the seven concurring judges in Gulating Court of Appeal.

February 29, 2016, Stavanger Police announced the case was appealed for the Supreme Court of Norway. on April 5, 2016, the Supreme Court of Norway accepted the appeal by the Norwegian Prosecuting Authority.

In June 2016, The Supreme Court of Norway ruled that the Haxi app could not be considered a "public place", and that thus, using Haxi cannot be considered illegal based on the transport law that prohibits offering person transport on a public place.

In June 2017, the three drivers received compensation for unjustified prosecution from Statens Sivilrettsforvaltning

=== Denmark ===
In June 2014, Haxi drivers started appearing in Denmark. On the July 10, 2014, the Danish Transport Authority notified the police about Haxi for operating an unlicensed taxi service.

On July 29, 2014, Haxi requested the Danish Transport Authority to revoke the note to the police.

March 21, 2016, Danish Police announced all Haxi investigations were cancelled.
