= Lyft =

American ride-sharing company

Lyft, Inc.
- Type: Public
- Traded as: Nasdaq: LYFT (Class A); Russell 1000 component; S&P 600 component
- Industry: Vehicle for hire
- Founded: June 9, 2012; 14 years ago (as Zimride)
- Founders: Logan Green; John Zimmer
- Headquarters: San Francisco, California, U.S.
- Area served: United States; Canada
- Key people: Logan Green (chairman); John Zimmer (president); David Risher (CEO)
- Revenue: ▲US$6.32 billion (2025)
- Operating income: ▲ -US$118 million (2025)
- Net income: ▲US$2.84 billion (2025)
- Total assets: ▲US$9.03 billion (2025)
- Total equity: ▲US$3.27 billion (2025)
- Number of employees: 3,913 (2025)
- Subsidiaries: Lyft Urban Solutions; Motivate; Freenow
- Website: lyft.com

Lyft, Inc. is an American company offering ride-hailing services, e-scooters, and bicycle-sharing systems in the United States and Canada, and, via its Freenow mobile app, Europe. Lyft is the second-largest ridesharing company in the United States after Uber. It has 25 million active riders and coordinates 9 million rides per day.

== Car schemes ==
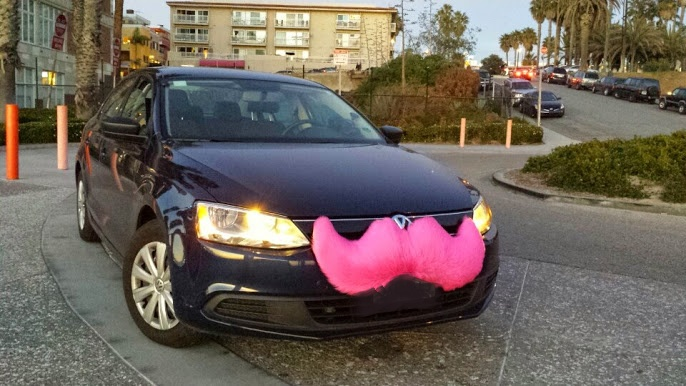
Lyft's distinctive pink mustache was the first branding the company used until 2015 when it switched to a smaller, glowing magenta mustache that sits on a driver's dashboard.

Lyft was launched in the summer of 2012 by computer programmers Logan Green and John Zimmer as a service of Zimride, a long-distance intercity carpooling company focused on college transport that they founded in 2007 after Green shared rides from the University of California, Santa Barbara, campus to visit his girlfriend in Los Angeles and was seeking an easier way to share rides.

In May 2013, the company changed its name from Zimride to Lyft. In July 2013, Lyft sold the original Zimride service to Enterprise Holdings, the parent company of Enterprise Rent-A-Car.

Lyft's marketing strategy included large pink furry mustaches that drivers attached to the front of their cars and encouraging riders to sit in the front seat and fist bump with drivers upon meeting. In November 2014, the company distanced itself from the fist bump. In January 2015, Lyft introduced a small, glowing plastic dashboard mustache it called a "glowstache" as an alternative to the large fuzzy mustaches on the front of cars. The transition was to help overcome the resistance of some riders to arrive at destinations, such as business meetings, in a car with a giant mustache.

In August 2014, the company introduced shared transport.

In December 2017, Lyft expanded into Canada, with operations in the Toronto, Hamilton and Ottawa metropolitan areas.

In March 2018, Lyft partnered with Allscripts on a platform allowing healthcare providers to arrange rides for patients who lack transportation to appointments with plans to roll out the service to 2,500 hospitals, 180,000 physicians, and approximately 7 million patients. In February 2018, Lyft hired former Tesla president of global sales and service Jon McNeill as chief operating officer.

In November 2018, Lyft settled a class action suit filed in 2014 alleging that the company sent many unwanted commercial text messages. In addition to $4 million in payments to consumers, the plaintiffs sought $1 million in legal fees.

In March 2019, Lyft became a public company via an initial public offering, raising $2.34 billion at a valuation of $24.3 billion. The company set aside some shares to be given to long-time drivers.

In March 2020, Lyft acquired Halo Cars which pays drivers to display digital advertisements on their vehicles. In April 2020, during the COVID-19 pandemic in the United States, Lyft laid off 982 employees and furloughed an additional 288 to reduce operating expenses. The company continued to offer scooters for rent in San Francisco, while Miami government asked Lyft to halt operations.

In August 2020, Lyft partnered with rental car company Sixt to provide users access rental cars, in exchange for a commission. Most of the rental cars are owned and operated by Sixt, with 85 locations in the U.S.

In December 2020, Lyft announced plans to launch a multi-city U.S. robotaxi service with Motional. Lyft sold its self-driving car division to Toyota for $550 million in April 2021. The division had partnerships with General Motors, NuTonomy, Ford Motor Company, GoMentum Station, and Magna International. It also owned Blue Vision Labs, a London-based augmented reality startup, acquired in 2018 for $72 million.

In November 2022, the company announced layoffs of approximately 700 employees, or about 13% of its staff.

In March 2023, David Risher was named CEO of the company.

In April 2023, the company announced layoffs of 1,076 corporate workers, or 26% of its staff. This came after job cuts announced in July and November 2022.

In September 2023, Lyft discontinued Lyft Rentals and stopped offering car rental services.

In July 2025, Lyft acquired Free Now for €175 million, expanding in Europe.

In September 2025, Lyft partnered with Waymo to use self-driving cars for its service in Nashville. It also partnered with May Mobility to launch self-driving cars in Atlanta.

In October 2025, Lyft acquired TBR Global Chauffeuring for £83 million.

== Cycle schemes ==
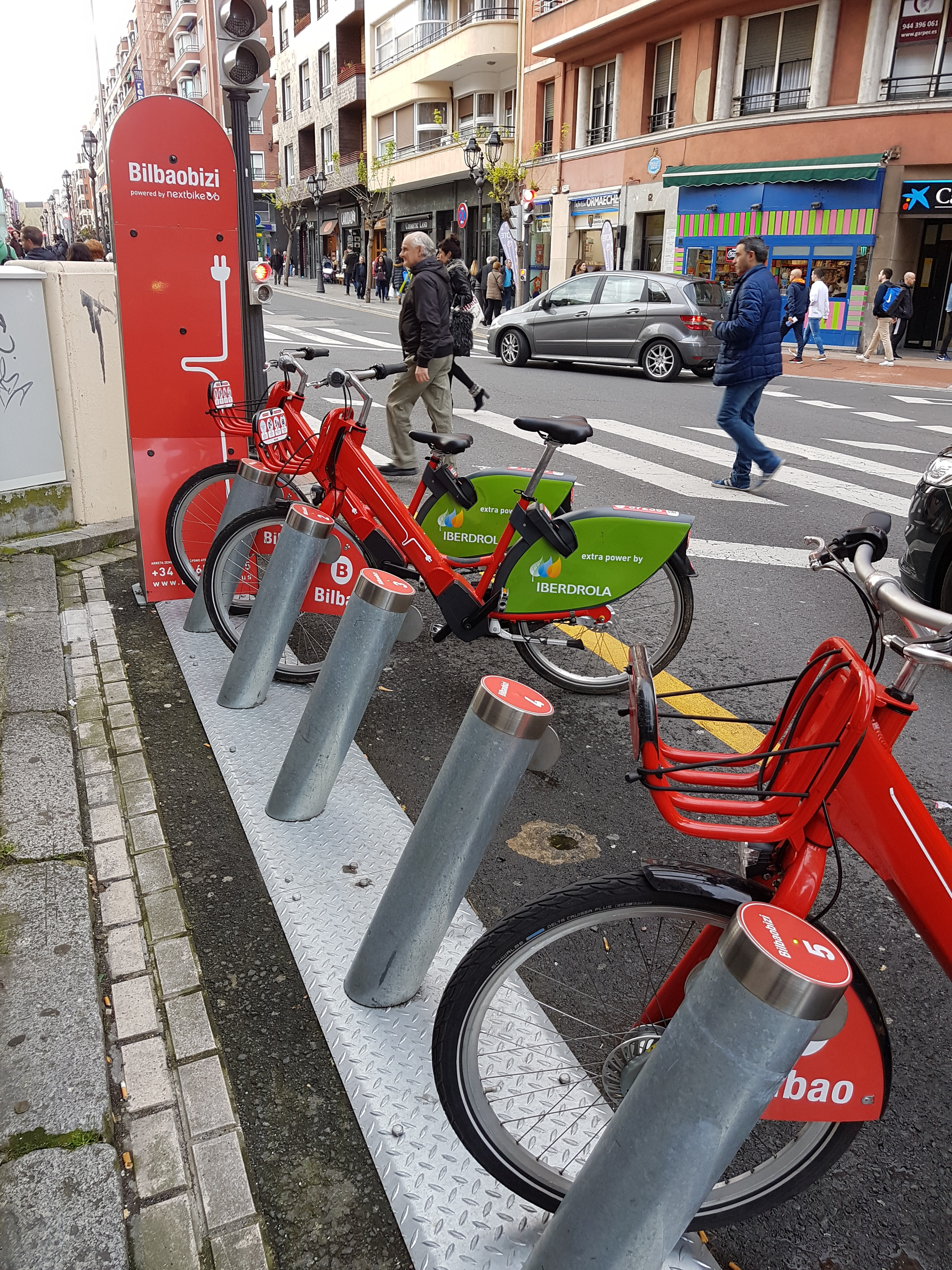
Bilbaobizi is a cycle sharing system owned by Lyft.

Lyft acquired Motivate, a bicycle-sharing system and the operator of Capital Bikeshare and Citi Bike, in November 2018. The company also announced plans to add 28,000 Citi Bikes and expand its service.

In April 2022, Lyft announced an agreement to acquire PBSC Urban Solutions, a Canadian bike-share equipment and technology supplier.

In 2026 Lyft acquired Serveo bikeshares in Spain.

== Finances ==
The company has annual revenues of $6 billion. For the second quarter of 2024, Lyft posted its first GAAP profit in the company’s history.

== Controversies ==
In early 2025, Detroit rapper Dajua Blanding, known as Dank Demoss, who claims to be "just under 500 pounds", filed a lawsuit against Lyft after a driver allegedly refused her ride, claiming she was "too big" to fit in the car. The incident, captured on video, led to public outrage and legal action, with Blanding asserting that weight-based discrimination is illegal under Michigan law. The lawsuit was settled out of court.

In October 2026, Lyft reached a settlement with the state of California to pay $237 million to drivers for alleged violations between April 2016 and December 2020, the largest wage theft settlement in the state's history. The lawsuit, filed in 2020 by California against Lyft and Uber and merged with other lawsuits from affected drivers, claimed that the companies mislabeled drivers as independent contractors instead of employees.

In November 2026, the US Department of Justice (DOJ) sued Lyft in California district court, alleging that the company has routinely denied service to disabled passengers.
