= Super Pumped (TV series) =

2022 American anthology drama television series

- Genre: Anthology; Drama; Biopic
- Created by: Brian Koppelman & David Levien
- Based on: Super Pumped: The Battle for Uber by Mike Isaac
- Starring: Joseph Gordon-Levitt; Kyle Chandler; Kerry Bishé; Babak Tafti; Jon Bass; Elisabeth Shue; Bridget Gao Hollitt; Uma Thurman
- Narrated by: Quentin Tarantino
- Music by: Brendan Angelides
- Country of origin: United States
- Original language: English
- No. of seasons: 1
- No. of episodes: 7

Production
- Executive producers: Allyce Ozarski; Allen Coulter; Stephen Schiff; Paul Schiff; Beth Schacter; Brian Koppelman; David Levien
- Producer: Sarah Acosta
- Cinematography: James Whitaker; Jim Frohna; Trevor Forrest
- Editors: Dana Congdon; Jane Rizzo; Todd Desrosiers; Doug Abel; Marnee Meyer
- Production companies: Best Available!; Showtime Networks

Original release
- Network: Showtime
- Release: February 27 – April 10, 2022

Super Pumped is an American anthology drama television series created by Brian Koppelman and David Levien, named for the 2019 nonfiction book of the same name by Mike Isaac. The first installment, subtitled The Battle For Uber, is based on Isaac's book and centers on the rise and fall of former Uber CEO Travis Kalanick, played by Joseph Gordon-Levitt. Also starring Kyle Chandler, Uma Thurman, and Elisabeth Shue, it premiered on Showtime on February 27, 2022.

Shortly before the series premiere, Showtime said it had renewed the series for a second season, based on a separate forthcoming book by Mike Isaac about Facebook. As of 2026, no further information about either the book or the second season has been announced.

== Premise ==
The show dramatizes the foundation of the ride-hailing company Uber from the perspective of the company's CEO Travis Kalanick, who is ultimately ousted in a boardroom coup.

== Cast and characters ==
=== Main ===
- Joseph Gordon-Levitt as Travis Kalanick
- Kyle Chandler as Bill Gurley
- Kerry Bishé as Austin Geidt
- Babak Tafti as Emil Michael
- Jon Bass as Garrett Camp
- Elisabeth Shue as Bonnie Kalanick
- Bridget Gao Hollitt as Gabi Holzwarth
- Uma Thurman as Arianna Huffington

The first season is narrated by Quentin Tarantino.

=== Recurring ===
- Annie Chang as Angie You
- Noah Weisberg as Quentin
- Darren Pettie as Hendricks
- Joel Kelley Dauten as Ryan Graves
- Ian Alda as Peter Fenton
- Sonny Valicenti as Matt Cohler
- Mishka Thébaud as Cory Kalanick
- Virginia Kull as Jill Hazelbaker
- Damon Gupton as David Drummond
- Amanda Brooks as Rachel Whetstone
- Erinn Ruth as Olivia Lungociu
- Mousa Hussein Kraish as Fawzi Kamel
- Rama Vallury as Tahir Khan
- Hank Azaria as Tim Cook
- Eva Victor as Susan Fowler
- Richard Schiff as Randall Pearson
- Rob Morrow as Eddy Cue
- Jessica Hecht as Amy Gurley
- Chelcie Ross as David Bonderman
- David Krumholtz as Sergey Brin

== Episodes ==
The Battle For Uber
No.	Title	Directed by	Written by	Original release date	U.S. viewers (millions)
1	"Grow or Die"	Allen Coulter	Brian Koppelman & David Levien	February 27, 2022	0.120
Kalanick, CEO of the startup UberCab, makes a deal with investor Bill Gurley to finance the operation. Under pressure to pay onerous fines from the San Francisco Mass Transit Authority, Kalanick and Chief Business Officer Emil Michael decide to shut down and rebrand themselves as a "ridesharing service" instead of a cab company.
2	"X to the X"	Daniel Gray Longino	Sarah Acosta	March 6, 2022	0.138
When Portland Uber drivers face fines and impounding by authorities posing as fares, Kalanick has the company begin tracking undercover regulators so that Uber drivers can avoid them, called greyballing. The company begins to expand despite competition from Lyft and bad publicity. Gurley has growing reservations about Kalanick's methods, though he is somewhat mollified when Kalanick keeps the press out of a blowout party in Vegas (the "X" of the title) to celebrate their NYC penetration. Kalanick and Angie's relationship breaks down, and he becomes involved with Gabi, a violin player.
3	"War"	Daniel Gray Longino	Stephen Schiff	March 13, 2022	0.154
Uber goes to war with its competitors, meanwhile Kalanick attempts to raise money from Google Ventures by bringing them into the fold, which Gurley objects to.
4	"Boober"	John Dahl	Emily Hornsby	March 20, 2022	0.112
The company still struggles to find direction as its heads disagree over its future. The startup's leaders visit Code Conference in Silicon Valley where they meet other titans of industry. As the rest of Kalanick's colleagues begin to lose faith in his grandiose ideas, he finds a new ally in Arianna Huffington.
5	"The Charm Offensive"	John Dahl	Safie M. Dirie	March 27, 2022	0.103
Kalanick is brought to a meeting at Apple, Inc. where it is revealed that the company is aware of Uber's data leak. Threatened with Uber being removed from the App Store, he claims that he was trying to become competitive in China and weed out fraud. Huffington and Gurley clash over their opinion on how best to help Kalanick.
6	"Delete Uber"	Zetna Fuentes	Beth Schacter	April 3, 2022	0.148
7	"Same Last Name"	Zetna Fuentes	Brian Koppelman & David Levien	April 10, 2022	0.085

== Production ==
=== Development ===
The project first emerged on September 18, 2019, when the non-fiction novel Super Pumped by New York Times technology journalist Mike Isaac was featured on The Hollywood Reporter's list of highly sought-after intellectual property. The following month, it was announced that Showtime had optioned the television rights to the book, with the intention to adapt the novel into a limited series. Billions co-creators Brian Koppelman and David Levien were attached to create, write, and executive produce the series under their overall deal with Showtime Networks. By March 2021, the series had quietly received a series pickup, with the series given a 2022 premiere timeframe. It was later announced in May 2021 that Showtime had officially given the project a series order, with the series following an anthology format, opening up the possibility of future seasons instead of the miniseries previously envisioned. The series, subtitled The Battle For Uber in its first season, premiered on February 27, 2022, on Showtime and Paramount+ Internationally. Allen Coulter was the director and executive producer for the first episode. On February 15, 2022, ahead of the series premiere, Showtime renewed the series for a second season which will focus on Facebook.

=== Casting ===
In May 2021, Joseph Gordon-Levitt and Kyle Chandler were cast in lead roles. In August 2021, Kerry Bishé, Babak Tafti, Mousa Hussein Kraish, and Hank Azaria were added to the main cast. The following month, Bridget Gao Hollitt and Elisabeth Shue joined the cast in lead roles while Virginia Kull, Amanda Brooks, Annie Chang, Erinn Ruth, and Mishka Thébaud were cast in recurring capacities. In October, it was announced Uma Thurman would be playing the role of Arianna Huffington. On February 16, 2022, it was reported that Quentin Tarantino is set as the narrator for the first season. Tarantino indicated he was a big fan of Billions which led Koppelman and Levien to pitch the role to him.

=== Filming ===
Principal photography began in September 2021 in Los Angeles, California.

== Reception ==
=== Critical response ===
The review aggregator website Rotten Tomatoes reported a 64% approval rating with an average rating of 6.5/10, based on 28 critic reviews. The website's critics consensus reads, "Super Pumped has energy to spare, but Joseph Gordon-Levitt's committed turn as an unpleasant tech honcho will leave many viewers feeling stuck in a particularly uncomfortable rideshare." Metacritic, which uses a weighted average, assigned a score of 63 out of 100 based on 19 critics, indicating "generally favorable reviews".

=== Ratings ===
Viewership and ratings per episode of Super Pumped
No.	Title	Air date	Rating (18–49)	Viewers (millions)
1	"Grow or Die"	February 27, 2022	0.01	0.120
2	"X to the X"	March 6, 2022	0.01	0.138
3	"War"	March 13, 2022	0.03	0.154
4	"Boober"	March 20, 2022	0.01	0.112
5	"The Charm Offense"	March 27, 2022	0.01	0.103
6	"Delete Uber"	April 3, 2022	0.01	0.148
7	"Same Last Name"	April 10, 2022	0.01	0.085
