= Rosaline Elbay =

Egyptian actress (born 1990)

- روزالين البيه
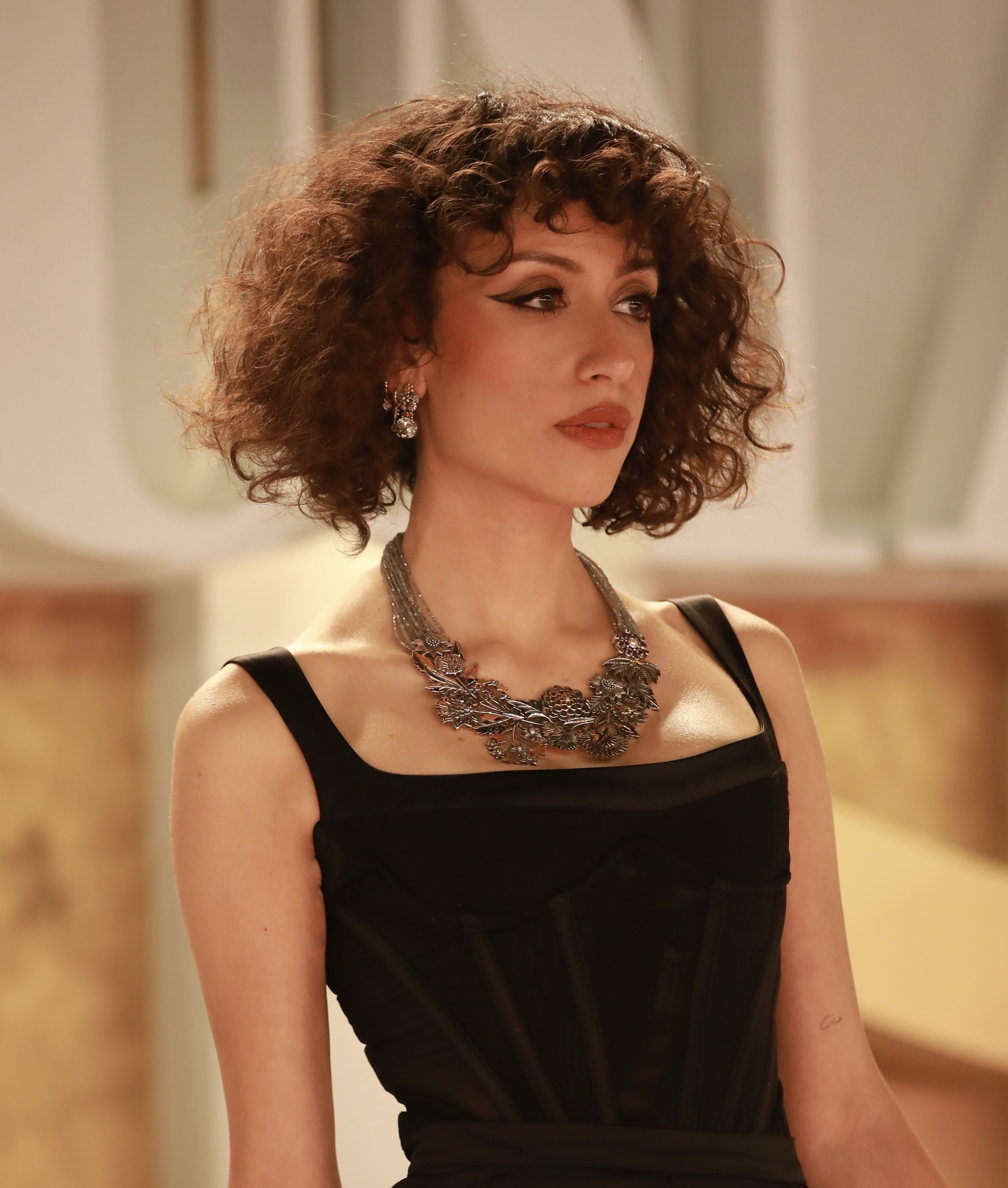
- Elbay at the GFF in 2025
- Born: Cairo, Egypt
- Citizenship: Egyptian
- Education: Oxford University, London School of Economics and Political Science, London Academy of Music and Dramatic Art
- Occupations: Actress, writer, producer
- Years active: 2018–present
- Awards: 2019, Al-Wafd Critics' Choice Awards

Rosaline Elbay (Arabic: روزالين البيه; /roʊzəliːn/) is an Egyptian stage and screen actress, producer and writer. She is known for her roles as Judy Goodwin on the Netflix series Kaleidoscope, Amani on the Hulu/A24 Films series Ramy, and Sara on the MBC Masr series Qabeel. She is currently starring as Nora Koriem on The Diplomat.

== Early life ==
Elbay was born to Egyptian parents and raised between the Cairo neighbourhood of Zamalek and the Sinai. She attended a British school in Cairo and grew up speaking English, Arabic and French.

Elbay performed in a production of The Sound of Music at the age of 11. As a child, she loved The Mummy and "wanted to be Evie", later choosing to pursue archaeology.

She studied Classics and Archaeology at Oxford University and was active in the Dramatic Society, winning a performance award in her first year. She then completed a Master's in Political science and Colonial History at the LSE, intending to participate in Egyptian politics after the revolution. Elbay credits Thelma Holt, who produced tours in which she starred, with urging her to pursue an acting career. She subsequently studied at the Actors Studio in New York City with Elizabeth Kemp before going on to complete the two-year MFA in Acting at LAMDA.

== Career ==
Elbay's early career was in UK theatre. She was primarily trained in Shakespeare before attending drama school.

In 2018 she appeared in her first Egyptian feature film, Diamond Dust, an adaptation of Ahmed Mourad's bestselling novel. She then starred in Fork & Knife, which premiered at that year's El Gouna Film Festival. Also in 2018, Elbay was the subject of the music video for "Fakra" by Massar Egbari, a band that rose to prominence during the 2011 Egyptian revolution, appearing as the love interest of lead singer Hany Dakkak. The Cairo International Film Festival appointed her as its first face for young filmmakers, a role she reprised in 2019.

Since 2019 Elbay has starred as Amani Hassan in US A24 series Ramy, Ramy Youssef's eponymous Golden Globe and Peabody Award-winning show. Also in 2019, she made her MENA region television debut as Sara on MBC Masr's Qabeel, directed by Karim El Shenawy. For this she received widespread critical acclaim, with Al-Masry Al-Youm calling her performance "captivating, refined and simple" and critic Mona Mahmood hailing her "rising and powerful talent... her scenes with Mohamed Mamdouh a duel." El Watan News called her an "actress of singular skills," and critic Mohamed Hesham referred to Elbay's roles as both Amani and Sara as showcases for her "effortless gravitas", writing, "it wasn’t until sometime later that I realised this was the same actress." Elbay won the 2019 Al-Wafd Critics’ Choice Awards for Best Supporting Actress and Best New Face for Qabeel.

Elbay hosted the opening ceremony of the 2019 El Gouna Film Festival alongside Aly Kassem. Her screenplay, Garlic, was selected for the festival's TV Development Workshop.

In 2020, Elbay was due to star in MBC Masr’s Forgetfulness (Luebet Al Nesyan) directed by Hani Khalifa. However, she left the show mid-filming for health reasons owing to the COVID-19 pandemic. The role was reshot, with Elbay stating that she was pleased to have been replaced by her friend Asmaa Galal.

In September 2021, Elbay was announced as a principal cast member of Eric Garcia's Netflix heist series Kaleidoscope. Her character, Judy Goodwin, was “the crew's demolitions specialist, headstrong and independent.” Elbay was the first cast member confirmed for the show, describing being sworn to secrecy. The series shot in various locations around New York, and was the first production to inaugurate the new Netflix Studios in Bushwick. It debuted on 1 January 2023, claiming the number one spot on Netflix's most-watched list. Brian Tallerico of Roger Ebert.com described Elbay's performance as "charming", and Esquire called her an actress "on the cusp of her big break."

In October 2022, Elbay starred as Diana, Princess of Wales in the off-Broadway world premiere of Dodi & Diana opposite her Kaleidoscope co-star Peter Mark Kendall. Elbay stated that she felt a lot of empathy for Diana as "a woman who was discovering her own agency and carving out her place in the world."

In 2023, she starred in Let Liv, which premiered at the Tribeca film festival, and in Hulu's Jagged Mind. She was also a special guest star on director Karim El Shenawy's Seventh-Year Itch, appearing as the voice of Aly Kassem's ex-partner Emma.

In 2024, Elbay joined season 2 of Netflix’s multi-award-winning series The Diplomat as Nora Koriem, Chief of staff to Vice President Grace Penn (Allison Janney). For season 3, she was co-nominated for the 2026 SAG Award for Best Ensemble in a Drama Series. The series has been renewed for a fourth season, with Elbay continuing to appear. Michael Block of Collider described her performance as "remarkable." Elbay also starred as Sylvie in Jon Bass's experimental vertical film Carole & Grey, which premiered at the 28th Tallinn Black Nights Film Festival.

In 2025, Elbay starred in Do No Harm, which premiered at the Chinese Theatre in LA. Also in 2025, Elbay was announced to lead Anton Sigurðsson's A Better Place alongside Theo Rossi and Billy Campbell as "a disgraced deputy, his anxious partner, and a sharp-tongued female prisoner who cover up a hit-and-run." She performed in the 2025 24 Hour Plays Gala in New York.

In October 2021, Elbay revealed that she is starring in an animated role and executive producing an unnamed project, both not yet announced.

== Personal life and advocacy ==
Elbay lives in Brooklyn, New York. She is a painter and describes herself as "still 40 percent archaeologist". She described her mother as a writer to YUNG magazine and has a younger brother who is a wheelchair user.

In 2019 Elbay hosted the opening ceremony of the El Gouna Film Festival, during which she wore a dress made of recycled plastic hand-worked by refugee women and sponsored by the UNHCR. She wore a second gown embroidered by the same women to resemble tatreez from her family heirlooms at the Cairo International Film Festival and participated in the UNHCR's first MENA-region roundtable on "The Role of Art and Culture in Addressing Displacement" in Jordan. Elbay has stated that her mother was repeatedly displaced as a child. She describes activism as "part of what I've signed up for; whatever I'm doing with my life." In 2024, she co-produced a 20-track fundraising album alongside Blood Cultures entitled "The Olive Tape", with proceeds going to Anera. Featured artists included Nick Hakim, Narcy, Vansire, and Jordana.

Elbay is referred to in MENA publications as an advocate for women's rights and contributed to the cancellation of a concert by Moroccan singer Saad Lamjarred due to his history of rape and assault. In 2020, Mada Masr published an op-ed by Elbay in response to the Egyptian MeToo movement, in which she stated that she had experienced domestic violence in a previous relationship.

Elbay has also advocated for increased diversity and accessibility in the film industry, telling GQ, "There are as many seats at the table as you want there to be.” She stated her support for the 2023 SAG-AFTRA strike.

During the COVID-19 pandemic, Elbay announced her departure from a lead role in MBC Masr series Forgetfulness (Luebet Al Nesyan) due to a preexisting heart condition.

In 2025, Elbay's interior design of her Boerum Hill apartment was featured in Apartment Therapy.

== Awards and nominations ==
Year	Award	Category	Nominated work	Result	Ref.
2019	Al-Wafd Critics' Choice Awards	Best Supporting Actress	Qabeel	Won	
2019	Al-Wafd Critics' Choice Awards	Best New Face	Qabeel	Won	
2026	SAG Awards	Outstanding Performance by an Ensemble in a Drama Series	The Diplomat	Nominated	

== Filmography ==
=== Film ===
Year	Title	Role	Notes
2018	Fork & Knife	The Mistress	
2018	Diamond Dust	Um Tona	
2023	Jagged Mind	Christine	
2023	Let Liv	Marty	
2024	The Decision	June	
2024	Carole & Grey	Silvie	
2025	Do No Harm	Leen	
2026	A Better Place	Diana	Post-production
TBA	Music for the Requiem Mass	Sarima	Post-production

=== Television ===
Year	Title	Role	Notes
2019	Qabeel	Sara	Main role
2019–present	Ramy	Amani Hassan	Recurring role
2023	Kaleidoscope	Judy Goodwin	Main role
2023	Seventh-Year Itch	Emma	Special guest star
2024–present	The Diplomat	Nora Koriem	Recurring role

=== Music videos ===
Year	Song	Artist
2018	"Fakra"	Massar Egbari

=== Theatre ===
Year	Title
2022	Dodi & Diana
2016	Tamar
2016	A Midsummer Night's Dream
2016	Five Women Wearing the Same Dress
2016	The Seagull
2015	The Duchess of Malfi
2014	Danny and the Deep Blue Sea
2013	Twelfth Night
2012	Machinal
2012	Arabian Nights
2011	The Picture of Dorian Gray
2011	The Government Inspector
2011	The Activist (Medea)
2011	Hamlet
2010	An Ideal Husband
2010	Toffee
