= Timeline of Uber =

This is a timeline of Uber, which offers a variety of transportation and logistics services and is an early example of the rise of the sharing economy.

== Full timeline ==
Year	Month and date	Event type	Details
2010	May	Company	Uber goes live for the first time in San Francisco, launches at SF AppShow, gives attendees first limo rides from app.
2010	December	Team	Ryan Graves steps down as CEO in favor of Travis Kalanick.
2011	May	National expansion	Uber goes live in New York City.
2011	September	National expansion	Uber goes live in Chicago.
2011	December 5	International expansion	Uber expands beyond the United States, starting by expanding into Paris.
2012	March 4	International expansion	Uber launches in Canada starting with Toronto.
2012	July 2	International expansion	Uber launches in London.
2012	June	Competition	Lyft, a competitor to Uber, launches in San Francisco.
2012	July	Product	Uber announces UberX, a service that uses lower-cost hybrid vehicles.
2013	April	Product	Uber adds ridesharing, where regular drivers use their personal vehicles as part of UberX.
2013	June	International expansion	Uber launches in Mexico City, Mexico.
2013	July	International expansion	Uber expands to Asia, starting in Singapore, Seoul, then Taipei
2013	August 8	International expansion	Uber expands to Africa, launching its first product in Johannesburg.
2013	August 29	International expansion	Uber expands to India, launching its first product in Bangalore.
2014	April 7	Product	Uber launches Uber Rush in New York City, a courier service using bicycle messengers to deliver packages. This marks the beginning of Uber's transition into a logistics company.
2014	June 6	Funding	Uber confirms it has raised $1.2 billion in a Series D round, with a pre-money valuation of $17 billion. Key investors include BlackRock, Google Ventures, Kleiner Perkins Caufield & Byers (with partner Megan Quinn), Menlo Ventures (Shawn Carolan), SherpaVentures (with partners Shervin Pishevar and Scott Stanford), Summit Partners, and Wellington Management.
2014	July 15	International expansion	Uber officially launches in China, starting with Beijing.
2014	July 24	International expansion	Uber officially launches in Lagos, expanding its presence to Western Africa.
2014	August 6	Product	Uber announces UberPool, which lets riders share rides based on proximity.
2014	September 8	International expansion	Uber officially launches UberX in Canada, starting with Toronto and Mississauga.
2014	October 22 – November 19	Controversy	On October 22, 2014, an article by Sarah Lacy in PandoDaily was published where she sharply criticised the "asshole culture" of Uber and said she intended to delete the app from her phone. On November 17, 2014, BuzzFeed editor-in-chief Ben Smith reported that Uber senior executive Emil Michael "outlined the notion of spending 'a million dollars'" to hire four top opposition researchers and four journalists. He said that team could help Uber fight back against the press by looking into "personal lives, your families". Michael was particularly focused on journalist Sarah Lacy, who accused Uber of “sexism and misogyny". Lacy wrote a sharp response critical of Uber's actions. The controversy was picked up by CNBC, Business Insider, and the New York Times Bits blog. Michael Wolff, the journalist who had arranged for and invited Smith to the private dinner where the controversial remarks were made, wrote a lengthy piece about the controversy, stating that Uber executives had believed that the event was off-the-record, but that he (Wolff) had failed to communicate the information to Smith.
2014	October 29	International expansion	Uber expands its operations in Canada by launching UberX in Montreal.
2014	December 4	Funding	Uber confirms it has raised $1.2 billion at a $40 billion pre-money valuation in a Series E round. Key investors include Qatar Investment Authority, Valiant Capital Partners, Lone Pine Capital, New Enterprise Associates, and SherpaVentures.
2014	December 8	Product	Uber expands UberFRESH in some parts of the Los Angeles area to include dinner delivery during weekdays.
2014	December 8	Controversy	An Uber driver in Delhi allegedly rapes a passenger when driving her home late at night.
2015	January 22	International expansion	Uber launches its first product in East Africa, in Nairobi.
2015	February 2	Team	Uber opens robotics research facility In Pittsburgh to build self-driving cars. In May, Uber poaches 50 employees from Carnegie Mellon's National Robotics Engineering Center.
2015	February 14	Competition	Didi Dache and Kuaidi Dache, the two biggest players in the low-cost app-based taxi hailing market in China, announce a merger into Didi Kuaidi. The merged company would be significantly larger than Uber in China.
2015	April 28	Product	UberFRESH, which launched in the Los Angeles area in August 2014, rebrands itself as UberEATS. The rebranding is linked to an effort to rapidly expand to other areas. The service is already available in New York City and Chicago and plans to expand to many other locations.
2015	June 17	Legal	California Labor Commission rules that a particular Uber driver is an employee, not independent contractor.
2015	July 15	Legal	Administrative judge recommends that Uber be fined $7.3 million and suspended from operating in California.
2015	July 31	Funding	It is announced that Uber has completed a Series F round, raising $1 billion at a $50 billion pre-money valuation (so a $51 billion post-money valuation). Key investors are Microsoft and Bennett, Coleman, & Co, Ltd., the parent company of The Times Group, India's largest media conglomerate.
2015	August 19	Funding	Uber raises $100 million in private equity from the Tata Opportunities Fund, a fund of the Tata Group in India, with the goal of using the money to help it double down on its India operations.
2015	September 9	Competition	Chinese Uber competitor Didi Kuaidi, the entity formed through the merger of Didi Dache and Kuaidi Dache, raises $3 billion to move more aggressively in its battle to maintain market dominance against Uber in China.
2015	October 15	International expansion	Uber further expands its operations in Canada by launching UberX in Calgary.
2015	December 3	Funding	Uber announces that it is raising $2.1 billion at a $62.5 billion valuation.
2015	December 3	Competition	Uber competitors Lyft (United States), Didi Kuaidi (China), Ola Cabs (India), and GrabTaxi (South-East Asia) (all of which have Softbank as an investor) announce a global technology and service alliance.
2015	December 9	Product	UberEATS, Uber's food delivery service, is spun off into a separate standalone app, and now offers all-day delivery in Toronto. The new app is not available for other regions.
2016	March 1 and 15	Product	On March 1, the new UberEATS app with all-day delivery launches in Los Angeles, California. On March 15, it launches in Chicago, Houston, and San Francisco, and announces plans to launch in a number of other US cities in the coming months.
2016	March 26	Competition	Grab, Uber's rival in Southeast Asia, acquires Uber’s Southeast Asia operations. As part of the acquisition, Uber will take a 27.5% stake in Grab.
2016	April 12	International expansion	Uber launches in Buenos Aires amidst claims of illegality and taxi protests.
2016	May 7–9	Local retreat	On May 9, Uber and Lyft cease operations in Austin, Texas. This is in response to a city ordinance upheld by Austin voters on May 7 that would require drivers for Uber, Lyft, and other similar companies to get fingerprint checks, to have their vehicles labeled, and to not pick up and drop off in certain city lanes.
2016	May and June	Product	Uber announces that it is changing its app to inform riders of the price of their ride when they book it, rather than simply providing a surge multiplier. The move is prompted by the observation that UberPool users, who do see the ride price upfront, are more likely to continue using the service. Price changes triggered by destination changes will be sent to riders in real time. Changes to routes due to traffic or other reasons not under the rider's control will not result in a change to the price charged upfront. The move is not an end to surge pricing but rather a change in the way the surge pricing is communicated to customers. The change, officially announced in late June, had already been rolled out at the time of announcement in several cities, and had received some commentary in May.
2016	June 9	Product	Uber opens up the Uber RUSH API to developers. The goal of this API is to make it easy for merchants to integrate the use of Uber drivers into their delivery system. The tool has been used by select small businesses since October 2015, and the opening up to the public is to encourage more widespread adoption.
2016	June 30	International expansion	Uber launches in Kyiv.
2016	July 24	Local retreat	Uber leaves Budapest.
2016	July 28	Legal	The Chinese government issues guidelines to make ride-hailing services, such as Uber, legal in the country.
2016	August 1	competition, mergers	Didi Chuxing (formerly Didi Kuaidi), the dominant player in China's ridesharing market, agrees to buy Uber China, Uber's business in China. The Uber brand will be retained, but Didi would “integrate the managerial and technological experience and expertise of the two teams.” Uber reportedly lost $2 billion trying to make inroads in China.
2016	August 18 (announcement)	Product, automation	Uber announces plans to launch service with self-driving cars in Pittsburgh, Pennsylvania, where its robotics research facility, built with employees poached from Carnegie Mellon University in 2015, is located. The cars are modified version of the Volvo sports utility vehicle equipped with Uber's technology for self-driving. Cars will have drivers at the wheel, monitoring the vehicle, as required by law. The move is seen by commentators as the first step in Uber's ambitious goal of replacing its entire fleet with autonomous vehicles.
2016	September 16	Product	Uber begins mapping UK streets in an effort to identify the best pick-up and drop-off points from its own images.
2016	October 28	Legal	Uber loses the case of Aslam v Uber BV on workers' rights. Appeals to the UK Employment Appeal Tribunal.
2016	November 2	Product, user experience	Uber launches a redesigned rider app, with a simplified user flow that focuses on identifying the destination first, then shows ride options with prices, and then gives driver contact information and allows riders to make adjustments such as split fare and get more information about the destination. The app also connects better with the user's current location, real-world identity, favorite places (such as work and home) and integration with services such as Foursquare and Yelp for destination-specific information, in what is seen as an attempt to pull users into spending more time in the app.
2017	March	Product	Uber begins beta testing a program in select cities to pick up passengers aged 13 through 17, previously not allowed on the company's terms of service.
2017	June 6	Team	Uber CEO Travis Kalanick takes summer sabbatical after an investigation into the company's workplace culture.
2017	June 21	Team	Travis Kalanick resigns as CEO.
2017	August 28	Team	Dara Khosrowshahi is hired as CEO.
2017	October 25	Product	A Uber branded Visa credit card is announced for the United States market, in partnership with Barclays. The card became open for applications on November 2, 2017.
2018	April 9	Product	Uber acquires Jump Bikes and launches Uber Bike.
2019	February 9	International expansion	Uber further expands its operations in Canada by launching in Saskatoon.
2019	May 10	Funding	Uber raises $8.1 billion at $45 per share in its IPO, valuing the company at $82 billion.
2019	May 15	International expansion	Uber further expands its operations in Canada by launching in Regina, Saskatchewan.
2020	December 20	International retreat	Uber sells its UberEATS business in India to Zomato for a 9.99% stake in the Indian food delivery company.
2020	December 3	International expansion	Uber further expands its operations in Canada by launching in Halifax, Nova Scotia.
2020	January 24	International expansion	Uber further expands its operations in Canada by launching in Vancouver and other parts of Metro Vancouver.
2024	February 15	Legal	Uber Technologies, Inc. faces multidistrict litigation in California federal court, alleging of failing to implement safety measures to prevent sexual assaults by its drivers. The lawsuit claims that Uber prioritized profits over safety and failed to adopt adequate background checks and safety protocols. The plaintiffs seek damages for negligence, negligent hiring, and product liability.
2026	February 23	Product	Uber announces its acquisition of parking app company SpotHero.

== See also ==
- Timeline of Lyft
