= Super Pumped =

2019 non-fiction book by Mike Isaac

- Author: Mike Isaac
- Language: English
- Publisher: W. W. Norton
- Publication date: September 3, 2019
- ISBN: 9780393652253

Super Pumped: The Battle for Uber is a 2019 book by New York Times journalist Mike Isaac. The book covers the events between the founding of Uber and its initial public offering in 2019.

== Background ==
The book was based on Mike Isaac's coverage of events at Uber for The New York Times.

== Synopsis ==
The book presents the history of Uber since its founding by Garrett Camp as UberCab in 2009. Travis Kalanick, who would later run the company and become its largest shareholder before being removed as CEO, was initially brought in as an advisor with its first employee, Ryan Graves, as its CEO. The book explains how Kalanick came to replace Graves, who stayed on with the company, and gained control over the startup. According to the book, Kalanick was bitter about how venture capitalists treated his first startup, Scour, and vowed not to be replaced by them again. The book details the "work hard, play hard" culture at Uber, citing a party where employees celebrated the first billion dollars in revenues in Las Vegas. It also examines the many scandals experienced by the company, including allegations of sexual harassment documented by Susan Fowler, attempts to keep regulators from hiring Uber drivers to avoid fines, and the mishandling of personal information, including in the case of a rape victim in India. It also looks at the ways that, despite these incidents, the company was considered a unicorn by venture capitalists. Isaac writes that Uber was once one of the highest valued private companies in Silicon Valley. The book ends with the company entering the market below its valuation target.

== Critical reception ==
The book was well-received upon publication. Wired named it its "Book of the Month", praising it for detailing the many problems at the company without vilifying Kalanick. Leslie Berlin wrote in The New York Times, "Isaac is great at the ticktock of events as they unfold, but his best work comes when he steps back to examine the bigger picture."

== Television adaptation ==
In May 2021, it was announced that Showtime had given a series order to a television adaptation of the book from Billions creators Brian Koppelman and David Levien. Koppelman, Levien, and Beth Schacter will be showrunners, writers, and executive producers. Joseph Gordon-Levitt will star as Kalanick. Kyle Chandler will also star as Bill Gurley. Kerry Bishé joined the cast as Austin Geidt. Babak Tafti and Mousa Hussein Kraish joined the cast. Hank Azaria joined the cast as Tim Cook. Bridget Gao-Hollitt was added to the cast as Gabi. The series premiered on February 27, 2022.
