= Cruelty (2016 film) =

2016 Icelandic film

- Film poster
- Icelandic: Grimmd
- Directed by: Anton Sigurðsson
- Screenplay by: Anton Sigurðsson
- Produced by: Anton Sigurðsson; Erlingur Jack Guðmundsson; Haraldur Bender; Arnar Benjamín Kristjánsson
- Starring: Margrét Vilhjálmsdóttir; Sveinn Ólafur Gunnarsson
- Cinematography: Árni Filippusson
- Edited by: Árni Freyr Haraldsson
- Production company: Virgo Films
- Release date: 21 October 2016 (Iceland)
- Running time: 104 minutes
- Country: Iceland
- Language: Icelandic

Cruelty (Icelandic: Grimmd) is a 2016 Icelandic film written and directed by Anton Sigurðsson.

The film revolves around two young sisters from Reykjavík who are found murdered and the two police detectives assigned to solve the case.

== Awards and nominations ==
In 2017, Cruelty was nominated for awards at the Filmfest Hamburg and Santa Barbara International Film Festival. Margrét Vilhjálmsdóttir was nominated for Actress of the Year at the Edda Awards.

== Court case ==
In 2023, director Anton Sigurðsson was found guilty of embezzling ticket sales from the film, using pre-paid ticket sales to pay outstanding salaries and other outstanding production expenses when an Icelandic Film Center (KMI) post-production grant was heavily postponed. However, Sigurðsson's father and another producer were found to have been responsible for the ticket purchases and transfers of funds respectively, resulting in one charge being dismissed and Sigurðsson receiving a vacated sentence. Nevertheless, Sigurðsson stated that he was "naive" and "took full responsibility for the case."
