= A Better Place (disambiguation) =

A Better Place is a 1997 drama film written and directed by Vincent Pereira.

A Better Place may also refer to:

- A Better Place (upcoming film), a dark comedy thriller directed by Anton Sigurðsson
- "A Better Place" (Chicago P.D.), a 2023 television episode
- "A Better Place", a 2004 song by Shifty from Happy Love Sick
- "A Better Place", a 2013 song by Silverstein from This Is How the Wind Shifts

== See also ==
- Better Place (disambiguation)
- "A Better Place to Be", a 1972 song by Harry Chapin
