= Asad (2026 film) =

Egyptian film

- Theatrical release poster
- Directed by: Mohamed Diab
- Written by: Mohamed Diab; Khaled Diab; Sheren Diab
- Produced by: Emad Said Ahmed; Mousa Abo Taleb; Alawi Abu Al-Ala
- Starring: Mohamed Ramadan; Maged El-Kidwani; Razane Jammal; Aly Kassem; Rakeen Saad; Kamel El Basha
- Cinematography: Ahmed Bishara
- Edited by: Ahmed Hafez
- Music by: Hisham Nazih
- Production companies: Good Fellas Media Production; Big Time Fund; Scoop Egypt Production
- Distributed by: Empire Entertainment; Arab Film Distribution
- Release date: March 19, 2026
- Countries: Egypt; Saudi Arabia
- Language: Arabic
- Budget: $6m
- Box office: $2.59m

Asad (Arabic: أسد) is a 2026 Egyptian historical action drama film directed by Mohamed Diab and co-written by Diab, Khaled Diab, and Sherine Diab. The film stars Mohamed Ramadan as an enslaved man in 19th-century Egypt who rebels against his masters and fights for the freedom of enslaved people, alongside Razane Jammal, Maged El-Kedwany, Aly Kassem, Kamel El Basha, Mustafa Shehata, Islam Mubarak, Eiman Yousif, Ahmed Dash, Mahmoud Alsarraj, and Amr Al-Qadi. The film was released theatrically in Egypt in May 2026.

== Premise ==
Set in 19th-century Egypt, the film follows Asad, a slave who harbors a deep sense of defiance against the system that binds him. His life takes a dangerous turn when he enters into a forbidden relationship with a free woman, challenging the rigid social order. As personal loss intensifies his resentment, Asad's quiet resistance evolves into open rebellion. He ultimately emerges as a leader among the enslaved, organizing a large-scale uprising that confronts the existing power structures and places the fate of their freedom in his hands.

== Production ==
Asad was produced by Good Fellas Media Production in collaboration with Big Time Fund and Scoop Egypt Production, with Empire Entertainment handling regional distribution and the Arab Film Distribution (AFD) overseeing the Egyptian market. Filming took place over a year and a half across locations in Saudi Arabia and Egypt. The screenplay, written over six months, has been described as a cinematic epic blending social, romantic, and action-driven storytelling.

Following a year of preparations, the film's production involved custom-built period, elaborate costumes for 2,000 extras, and large-scale action sequences led by internationally renowned stunt designer Kaloyan Vodenicharov.

The film features an ensemble of over 70 actors, including stars and guest appearances from Egypt, Palestine, Lebanon, and Sudan.

The film's creative team includes Ahmed Bishara as cinematographer, Ahmed Fayez as production designer, Reem El Adl for costume design, Ahmed Hafez for editing, an original score by acclaimed composer Hisham Nazih and the teaser and poster was created by Marcus Arian and Karim Adam, respectively.

Post-production took place both within Egypt and internationally.

== Release ==
Asad was released theatrically in Egypt on 14 May 2026, with screenings beginning that day. It was subsequently released in cinemas across the Gulf region and other Middle Eastern countries, including the United Arab Emirates, Bahrain, Iraq and Jordan, on 21 May 2026. Following its release in the Arab world, the film was released theatrically in several other countries, including the United States, Canada, Australia and Germany on 11 June 2026.

=== Box office ===
The film grossed $1.63 million in Egypt and a combined $953,254 in Saudi Arabia and the United Arab Emirates. Figures from other Arab markets were not publicly disclosed. Against a production budget of $6 million, the film is considered to be a commercial failure.

=== Critical response ===
Asad received mixed reviews from critics.

Angy Essam of Egypt Today praised Mohamed Diab's direction, visual style, production design and Mohamed Ramadan's performance, while noting weaknesses in the pacing and development of some supporting characters. Safy Allam of Cairo Gossip similarly praised the film's emotional weight, characterisation and ambition, while noting some pacing issues and underdeveloped character arcs.

Alia Talaat described the film as "at best a mediocre film" that failed to justify its extensive publicity, arguing that despite its Hollywood-style production values, the screenplay and some performances suffered from significant weaknesses. Duaa Abu Al-Diya praised the cinematography, production design, costumes, visual effects, and the performances of Kamel El Basha and Aly Kassem, while criticizing aspects of the dialogue and screenplay.

Writing for Middle East Eye, critic Joseph Fahim gave the film a "Rotten" rating on Rotten Tomatoes, criticizing its treatment of the historical subject matter and arguing that its narrative choices created contradictions with the historical context it sought to depict.
