= Massar Egbari =

Egyptian rock band

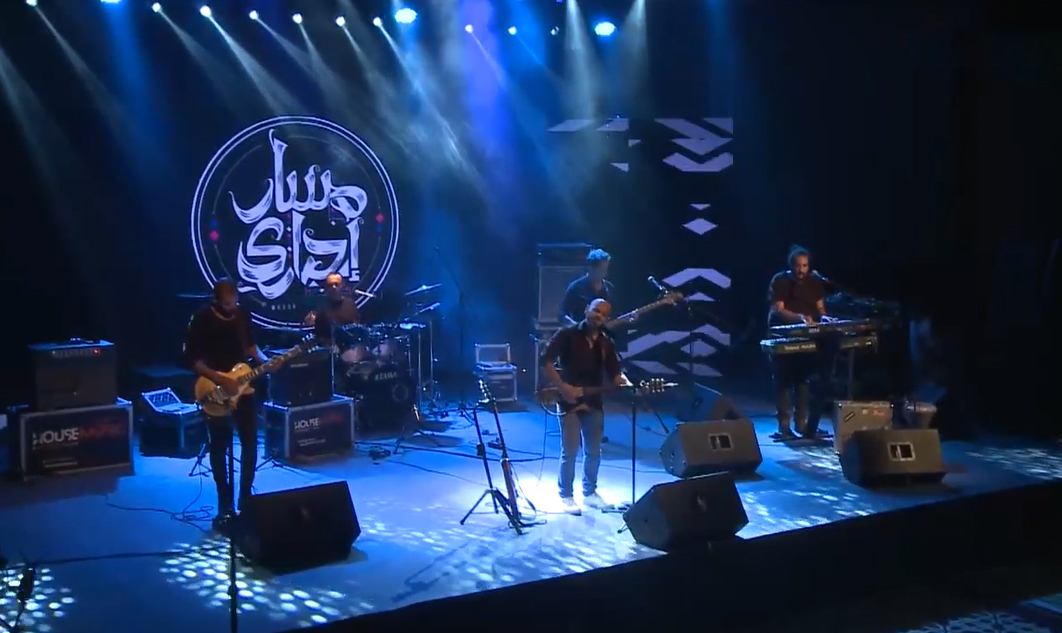
- Massar Egbari concert in 2018

Background information
- Genres: Alternative rock
- Years active: 2005-present
- Members: Hany El Dakkak, Tamer Attallah

Massar Egbari is an Egyptian rock band that was officially launched in 2005 from Alexandria, Egypt. The band consists of 5 musicians: Ayman Massoud (keyboards), Hany El Dakkak (guitar and lead vocals), Ahmed Hafez (bass guitar), and Tamer Attallah (drums). Mahmoud Siam (guitar) joined the band in 2008. The band performs a kind of alternative Egyptian music, mixing rock, jazz and blues with Oriental music. "Massar Egbari" means "Compulsory Detour", a name intended to reflect how society forces people to think and live their lives in a certain way. The band pokes fun at typical social norms and trends. The band mainly concentrates on presenting music and songs talking about social problems. Love is not their main concern although it represents a part of their songs.

== Performances ==
In 2007, the band played for the first time in Europe as part of the Malta Arts Festival held in Valletta, Malta. The same year, they also appeared in the Barisa Rock Festival (Rock for Peace) held in Istanbul, Turkey. In 2008, the band played in The Biennale of young artists from Europe and the Mediterranean in Bari, Italy.

In 2009, Massar Egbari played at a festival in Cairo in support of the people of the Gaza Strip, then at the International Adriatic-Mediterranean Festival in Ancona, Italy. In the same year, Massar Egbari was invited to perform as a special guest in the Bienale of young artists in Skopje to perform with Monistra band from Macedonia in their common project Alexsopje (Alexandria-Skopje) and in 2010, the band performed for the first time along with other artists from Africa in Sauti Za Busara Festival in Zanzibar.

On May 29, 2014, Massar Egbari performed alongside Black Theama and Cairokee. Massar Egbari members (nationally and internationally) attended several workshops, won several prizes, as well as composing music for a number of movies. Massar Egbari appeared El-Hawi, a 2010 film by Ibrahim El-Batout (director of Ein-Shams) about people living in Alexandria, and in Microphone, a film by Ahmed Abdallah El-Sayed (director of Heliopolis) in a film taking about underground artists in Alexandria with Khaled Abo El-Naga, Menna Shalaby, Yosra El-Lozy and Alexandrian underground artists.

Massar Egbari was featured on the 2014 compilation Songs from a Stolen Spring that paired Western musicians with artists from the Arab Spring. On the album, Massar Egbari's "I Still Exist" was mashed with Maria McKee's performance of the Tony Joe White song "Ol' Mother Earth".

In April 2019, Massar Egbari performed alongside Cairokee, 47 Soul, Mashrou' Leila and El Morabba3 at the Wasla music festival in Dubai. In an attempt to support the underground music scene, the bands shared the stage with a number of local talents such as Karrouhat, Shaghaf and Redaround.

== Additional Trivia ==
In 2018, Massar Egbari released a music video for "Fakra" starring actor Rosaline Elbay.

== Discography ==
- إقرا الخبر Read The News (2013)
- Songs from a Stolen Spring (compilation) (2014)
- تقع وتقوم Rise and Fall (2015)
- الألبوم The Album (2018)
- ماباقتش اخاف I'm not afraid anymore (2025)
