= Anton Sigurðsson =

Icelandic film director and screenwriter

Anton Ingi Sigurðsson
- Born: 31 August 1987 (age 38)
- Occupations: film director; screenwriter

Anton Ingi Sigurðsson (born 31 August 1987) is an Icelandic film director and screenwriter.

== Career ==
Anton Sigurdsson is a Scandinavian filmmaker, writer, and director.

In 2014, Sigurdsson gained recognition in Iceland with his short film Secrets & Lies, which received multiple awards and led to his early emergence within the Icelandic film industry. He subsequently became one of the youngest directors in Icelandic history to direct a feature film.

Sigurdsson has since directed several feature films, including Cruelty, which achieved commercial success and was distributed on platforms such as Amazon Prime Video and HBO. His work has been screened at international film festivals, including the Santa Barbara International Film Festival, Hamburg Film Festival, International Film Festival Rotterdam, and the Göteborg Film Festival.

In 2019, he created and directed the television series The Florida Prisoner, which aired on Channel 2 in Iceland. The series received nominations at the Icelandic Academy Awards and achieved strong viewership ratings upon release.

== Filmography ==
- Director
  - Graves & Bones (Icelandic: Grafir & bein) (2014)
  - Cruelty (Icelandic: Grimmd) (2016)
  - Full Pockets (Icelandic: Fullir vasar) (2018)
  - The Florida Project (Icelandic: Flóridáfanginn) (2019)
  - Refuge (2026)
  - A Better Place (post-production)
  - Pandemonium (in production)

== Personal life ==
In 2023, Sigurðsson was found guilty of embezzling ticket sales from his 2016 film Cruelty, using pre-paid ticket sales to pay outstanding salaries and other outstanding production expenses when an Icelandic Film Center (KMI) post-production grant was heavily postponed. However, Sigurðsson's father and another producer were found to have been responsible for the ticket purchases and transfers of funds respectively, resulting in one charge being dismissed and Sigurðsson receiving a vacated sentence. Nevertheless, Sigurðsson stated that he was "naive" and "took full responsibility for the case."
