= Emil Michael =

American businessman (born 1972)

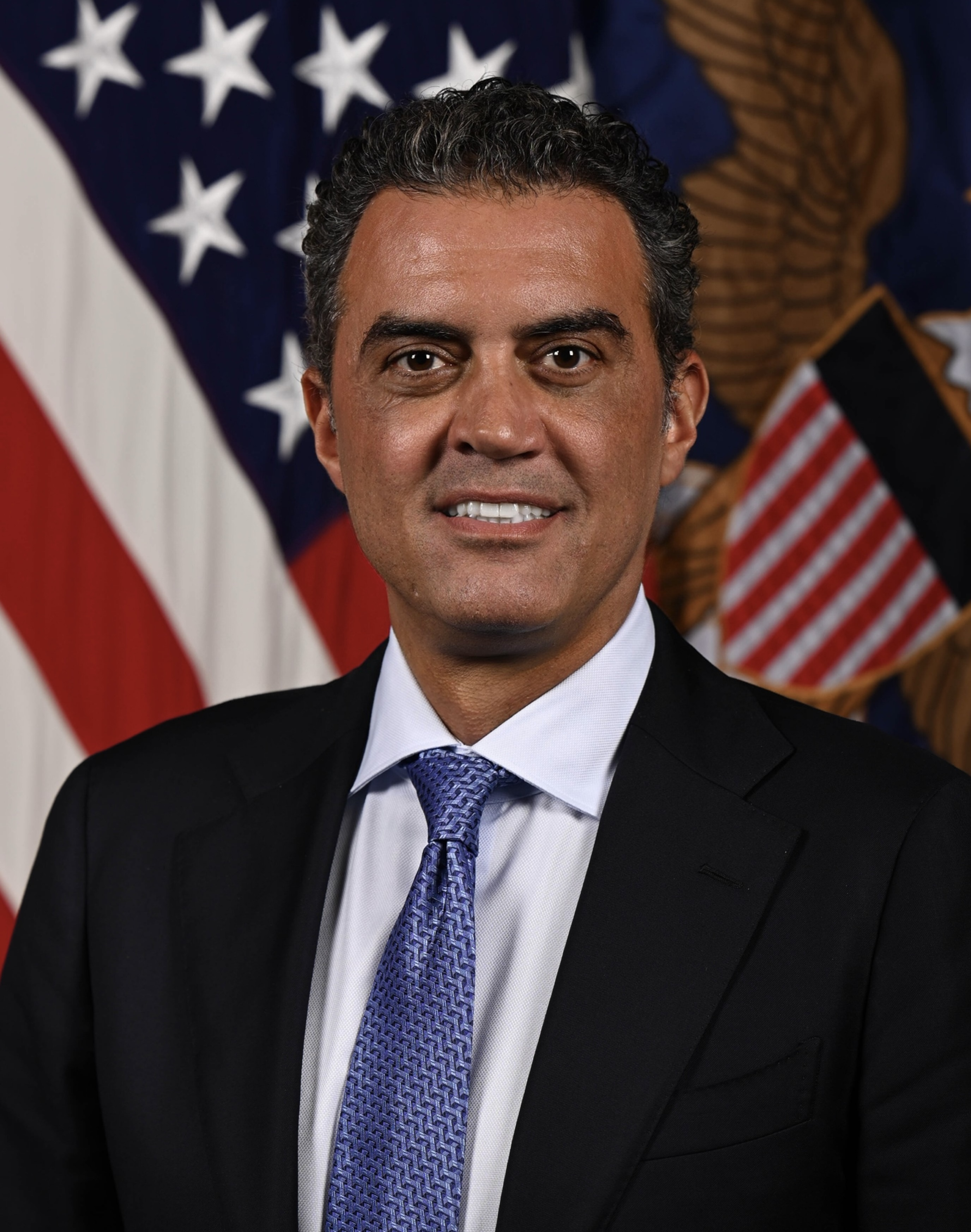
- Official portrait, 2025

Under Secretary of Defense for Research and Engineering (Note: Also known as the under secretary of war for research and engineering.)
- Incumbent
- Assumed office May 20, 2025
- President: Donald Trump
- Preceded by: Heidi Shyu

Personal details
- Born: Emil George Michael; 1972 (age 53–54) Cairo, Egypt
- Party: Republican
- Spouse: Julie Herrin (m. 2018)
- Education: Harvard University (BA); Stanford University (JD)

Emil George Michael (born 1972) is an American businessman who has served as the under secretary of defense for research and engineering since 2025.

Michael graduated from Harvard University with a Bachelor of Arts in government in 1994 and from Stanford Law School with a Juris Doctor in 1998. He worked for Goldman Sachs and later helped establish Tellme Networks, an automated phone system company. In 2009, Michael became a special assistant to Secretary of Defense Robert Gates through the White House Fellows program. Michael served in the position for two years before departing. In 2012, he became the chief operating officer of Klout, an analytics firm.

In September 2013, Michael was hired as Uber's senior vice president of business. He helped negotiate agreements and secure funding for the company. In that time, Michael served as the effective deputy to Uber's chief executive, Travis Kalanick. Michael became involved in a controversy over remarks about monitoring journalists in November 2014. After a second incident in which Michael was alleged to have participated in an escort bar and told a concerned employee to speak positively of the event to the press, Michael was fired in June 2017.

In December 2024, President-elect Donald Trump named Michael as the under secretary of defense for research and engineering. He was confirmed by the Senate in May 2025.

== Early life and education (1972–1998) ==
Emil George Michael was born in 1972 in Cairo. Michael's father was a pharmacist, while his mother was a chemist. Michael was raised in New Rochelle, New York. In his youth, he worked for his father's pharmacy. According to Michael, his parents emigrated from Egypt to flee persecution. Michael graduated from New Rochelle High School in June 1990. He attended Harvard University. Michael served as the president of the Harvard Republican Club; as the club's president, Michael advocated for inclusivity, including by incorporating Radcliffe College into its name. He graduated cum laude from Harvard University with a Bachelor of Arts in government in 1994 and from Stanford Law School with a Juris Doctor in 1998.

== Career ==
=== Early work (1998–2009) ===
After graduating from Stanford University, Michael worked as an investment banker for Goldman Sachs in its communications, media, and technology department. In 1999, he helped establish Tellme Networks, an automated phone system company. Michael's work included negotiating agreements with companies, including AT&T and FedEx. He reached a deal with AT&T that involved the company taking an equity stake in Tellme Networks at the same time that TellMe Networks would purchase billions of phone minutes from AT&T. After Microsoft acquired Tellme Networks for US$800 million in 2007, Michael left the company.

=== Department of Defense and Klout (2009–2013) ===
In 2009, Michael became a special assistant to Secretary of Defense Robert Gates through the White House Fellows program. According to Michael, he traveled with Gates to several locations, including Afghanistan and Pakistan. He left the program in 2011. After leaving the Department of Defense, Michael returned to private industry, where he advised multiple companies, including the analytics firm Klout. In July 2012, Klout hired Michael as its chief operating officer. He secured funding from Microsoft shortly after taking the position and was involved in negotiating deals with partner companies to link high Klout scores with physical benefits.

=== Uber (2013–2017) ===
In 2013, the venture capitalist Bill Gurley connected Travis Kalanick, the chief executive of Uber, to Michael. According to Super Pumped (2019), Gurley believed that the aggressive Kalanick needed a counterbalance and that Michael would deliver deals for Uber. In September 2013, Uber hired Michael as its senior vice president of business; his actual position was closer to Kalanick's deputy. Kalanick and Michael developed a close relationship that included combined vacations and visits to nightclubs. They worked to attract investment firms through a strategy in which Kalanick would impress investors and Michael would wait to respond to follow-up offers, giving them the impression that Uber was highly desirable. Michael's department was also responsible for external agreements, such as deals with tire manufacturers or banks, to give drivers exclusive discounts. In August 2014, Michael joined the Defense Business Board, advising the Department of Defense on procurement.

In November 2014, BuzzFeed News reported that Michael had suggested Uber should hire opposition researchers to investigate journalists who criticize the company. Michael's comments appeared particularly directed at the journalist Sarah Lacy, who had reported on Uber's alleged culture of "sexism and misogyny". The remarks were widely reported and damaged the public image of executives at Uber, including Michael and Kalanick. The Department of Defense distanced itself from Michael's comments after the article was published. Within Uber, the controversy damaged Kalanick's efforts to improve its image. Michael apologized to Lacy and stated that his comments "were borne out of frustration", while Kalanick defended Michael, believing that he could learn from his mistakes. The controversy occurred amid existing concerns about Uber's privacy practices.

In March 2017, The Information published an article that alleged Kalanick and several other employees at Uber, including Michael, had visited an escort bar in Seoul three years prior. The encounter had made an Uber employee uncomfortable. According to The Information, Michael called the employee and told her that he feared that the visit would be reported by the press. He instructed her to tell reporters that she "had a good time". The call prompted the employee to discuss the incident with Kalanick and Rachel Whetstone, Uber's public relations executive. She later reported the encounter to Uber's human resources department; according to Uber, it had been referred to Uber's general counsel, Tammy Albarrán, who sent the allegations to Attorney General Eric Holder. On June 11, Albarrán and Holder recommended that Uber should fire Michael and impose a leave of absence for Kalanick. Hours later, Michael was fired.

=== Post-Uber work (2017–2024) ===
After leaving Uber, Michael moved to Miami. In January 2018, he married Julie Herrin, a sales executive whom he had met in Las Vegas in 2012. In October, he was hired by the investment management firm Coatue Management as a consultant. By October 2020, Michael had established DPCM Capital, a special-purpose acquisition company. That month, he listed the company on the New York Stock Exchange, garnering US$300 million. He led a US$340 million deal with D-Wave Systems, a quantum computing company, in February 2022. In May 2024, Perplexity AI added Michael to its advisory board.

== Under Secretary of Defense for Research and Engineering (2025–present) ==
=== Nomination and confirmation ===
Following Donald Trump's victory in the 2024 presidential election, several technology executives suggested to Trump that he nominate Michael as the secretary of transportation, according to The New York Times; Michael had reportedly been considered for the position in Trump's first presidential transition. According to Bloomberg News, Michael had been considered for the position. Former Representative Sean Duffy, who was favored by Trump's campaign manager, Susie Wiles, was chosen as the secretary of transportation instead.

On December 22, 2024, Trump named Michael as his nominee to serve as the under secretary of defense for research and engineering. Michael oversaw work cutting regulations at the Department of Government Efficiency prior to his nomination. He appeared before the Senate Committee on Armed Services, alongside Michael Duffey, Keith Bass, and Troy Meink on March 27, 2025. Michael told the committee that he would improve relations with the technology industry, work with venture capitalists, and develop emerging technologies. The Senate voted to confirm Michael in a 54–43 vote on May 14.

=== Tenure ===
Michael (right) with Secretary of Defense Pete Hegseth (left) in July 2025

In February 2026, Michael began negotiating with the artificial intelligence company Anthropic on a US$200 million contract. The talks fell through after Anthropic sought restrictions on the use of its technology, leading to a dispute with the Department of Defense. Michael publicly criticized Anthropic's chief executive, Dario Amodei, accusing him of being a "liar" with a god complex.

== Views ==
Michael is a Republican. In an interview with The Harvard Crimson in 1992, he criticized Vice President Al Gore for having an "environmental freak attitude". Michael is pro-choice.

== Works cited ==
- Isaac, Mike (2019). Super Pumped: The Battle for Uber. W. W. Norton & Company. ISBN 978-0-393-65224-6.

Political offices
Preceded by Heidi Shyu	Under Secretary of Defense for Research and Engineering; 2025–present	Incumbent
