= Do No Harm (2025 film) =

- Directed by: Chris Hartwell
- Written by: Chris Hartwell
- Starring: Harry Shum Jr. Rosaline Elbay; Ronny Chieng; Jimmy Gonzales
- Release date: 2025
- Country: United States
- Language: English

Do No Harm is a feature film starring Harry Shum Jr., Rosaline Elbay and Ronny Chieng. It is directed by Chris Hartwell and "follows an exceptional home-health nurse whose world unravels after a simple mistake turns fatal".

== Development ==
Hartwell wrote the film in tribute to his father, who is a doctor, and his wife, who is a home health nurse. "Their nobility and sacrifice have humbled me. I knew that, one day, I needed to find a way to honor them—and the countless others like them—on screen."

== Release ==
The film was the opening night movie of the 2025 Dances With Films festival at the Chinese Theater in Los Angeles.
