= Blood Cultures =

American experimental pop band

- Origin: New Jersey, United States
- Genres: Experimental; indie pop; psychedelic pop; electropop; chillwave
- Years active: 2013–present
- Website: blood-cultures.com

Blood Cultures is an American experimental indie pop group from New Jersey. First known as a single person and now recognized as a collective (a quartet as of 2019), the band's members remain anonymous, their faces obscured by black hoods in all photos. As they have explained, their anonymity is crucial to their ethos and aims "to keep the relationship between the listener and the music as pure as possible". Hailed as some of the most exciting music coming out of New York by NME in 2018, Blood Cultures' genre-bending sound is often characterized as psychedelic pop, electropop, and chillwave. Blood Cultures released their first album, Happy Birthday, in 2017, their second, Oh Uncertainty! A Universe Despairs, in 2019, their third, LUNO, in 2021, and in 2025, they wrote the soundtrack to the video game Skate Story.

== History ==
=== 2013–2017: First singles and Happy Birthday ===
Blood Cultures released their debut single, "Indian Summer", in October 2013, by uploading it to Soundcloud. The project was launched with conspicuously little background information. At the time, it had no social media accounts or biography and was only represented by a photograph of an individual with a black hood. The first single was followed by "Mercury Child" and "Meavy Hetal", in February and April 2014, respectively. The single "Scenes from a Midnight Movie" was released in September 2015 with what would eventually be revealed as the artwork for the group's debut album, Happy Birthday, which was in turn released in July 2017 and accompanied by some of their first interviews. Blood Cultures made their first performance at Rough Trade in August 2017 to celebrate the release, and went on to perform with acts such as Princess Nokia and Yumi Zouma throughout the year.

=== 2018–2019: Oh Uncertainty! A Universe Despairs and first tour ===
Blood Cultures released a single and video for "Dunk on Me" on Halloween 2018, the first material from their sophomore album. This was followed by "Flowers for All Occasions" in March 2019, a single inspired by the hijacking of local New Jersey TV stations in the early 1990s. With the release of the single "Best for You" in June 2019, Blood Cultures announced their album Oh Uncertainty! A Universe Despairs, set for publication that September. The single was accompanied by a manifesto conveying Blood Cultures' convictions to remain anonymous, explaining that "disclosing our personalities, politics, alignments, intentions, orientations, etc., could detach the listener further from the personal connection that they have made with the music" and urging that "art is not what the artist intends it to be but rather what you make of it". Following the release of an additional single, "No Favors", in August, the band issued their twelve-track album in September. In interviews, Blood Cultures described the album as "a conversation between two opposing sides that share a single relationship" and "a personal journey of self-discovery". The album received generally positive reviews, such as "a bright and beautiful blend of cultures, wandering vocals, and electronic beats" and "one of 2019's greatest experiences". In November, Blood Cultures released a video for the album's song "Broadcasting", which commented on the question of identity for those who feel pulled between two cultures. The band promoted the album with their first US headline tour in late 2019.

=== 2021–2024: LUNO and The Olive Tape ===
In January 2021, Blood Cultures made their comeback with a new single, titled "Keeps Bringing Me Back", from their upcoming project, LUNO. In February, they released a new single, "Beneath the Moon & Me". The third single came out in March and was titled "Set It on Fire". The fourth single from the upcoming album, "When the Night Calls...", was released in April, and LUNO came out in May.

In 2024, Blood Cultures, together with Rosaline Elbay and Dario Ladani Sanchez, curated and produced The Olive Tape, an album that includes poetry and music by such artists as Nick Hakim, Vansire, Narcy, Jordana, Fire-Toolz, Hala Alyan, and Inua Ellams. The record was created to raise awareness of the ongoing displacement of Palestinian people within Gaza, with all proceeds donated to Anera and the Palestine Children's Relief Fund.

=== 2025–present: Skate Story Vol. 1 ===
In December 2025, Blood Cultures released the album Skate Story: Vol 1, which serves as the soundtrack to the video game Skate Story.

== Musical style ==
The elements that comprise Blood Cultures' sound include psychedelic textures, bedroom pop beats, and tropical melodies. Indicative of their experimental approach, their arrangements have been characterized by "warm, lo-fi guitars; wobbling synths; washed-out percussion; and auto-tuned, cut-and-paste vocals", "drenched in maximum reverb". Though they hesitate to discuss their influences, Blood Cultures have been likened to LCD Soundsystem, Toro Y Moi, and Jai Paul.

== Discography ==
=== Albums ===
Title	Album details
Happy Birthday	Released: July 21, 2017; Formats: digital download, streaming, LP; Label: Independent
Oh Uncertainty! A Universe Despairs	Released: September 13, 2019; Formats: Digital download, streaming, LP; Label: Independent
LUNO	Released: May 28, 2021; Formats: Digital download, streaming, LP; Label: Independent
Skate Story: Vol. 1	Released: December 8, 2025; Formats: Digital download, streaming, LP; Label: Independent

=== Singles ===
Title	Year	Album
"Indian Summer"	2013	Happy Birthday
"Mercury Child"	2014	Happy Birthday
"Meavy Hetal"	2014	Happy Birthday
"Scenes from a Midnight Movie"	2015	Happy Birthday
"Dunk on Me"	2018	Oh Uncertainty! A Universe Despairs
"Flowers for All Occasions"	2019	Oh Uncertainty! A Universe Despairs
"Best for You"	2019	Oh Uncertainty! A Universe Despairs
"No Favors"	2019	Oh Uncertainty! A Universe Despairs
"Hard to Explain"	2020	Non-album single
"Keeps Bringing Me Back"	2021	LUNO
"Beneath the Moon & Me"	2021	LUNO
"Set It on Fire"	2021	LUNO
"When the Night Calls..."	2021	LUNO
"Set It on Fire (Extended Version)"	2022	Non-album single
"Emptylands"	2025	Skate Story: Vol. 1
