= Jon Bass (actor) =

American actor (born 1989)

- Born: Jonathan Bass; September 22, 1986 (age 40); Bellaire, Texas, U.S.
- Education: Boston University (BFA)
- Occupation: Actor
- Years active: 2007–present

Jonathan Bass (born September 22, 1986) is an American actor, known for his roles in She-Hulk: Attorney at Law, Super Pumped, Baywatch, and the comedy series Big Time in Hollywood, FL and Miracle Workers.

== Early life and education ==
Bass grew up in Bellaire, Texas, and attended Bellaire High School, graduating in 2005. He graduated from Boston University in 2011 with a Bachelor of Fine Arts degree in Theatre Arts. He is Jewish.

== Career ==
Following college, he moved to New York City and began his professional acting career. Bass auditioned for the role of Elder Cunningham in the Broadway musical The Book of Mormon, but was not cast. A year later, he was cast in the role in the Denver and Los Angeles productions and went on to replace Josh Gad in the role on Broadway.

In 2014, he played a small role in the HBO comedy series Girls, and then had minor guest roles in The Newsroom and House of Lies. Later in 2015, he was cast in a lead role in the Comedy Central's series Big Time in Hollywood, FL, portraying Del Plimpton.

In 2016, he played real-life attorney Philip Hirschkop in the historical film Loving. In 2017, he appeared in the film All Nighter. He played the role of C.J. Parker's significant other, Ronnie Greenbaum in the action comedy film Baywatch, along with Zac Efron and Dwayne Johnson, and appeared in Molly's Game, directed by Aaron Sorkin.

Bass portrays a fictionalized version of Uber cofounder Garrett Camp opposite Joseph Gordon-Levitt in the drama series Super Pumped which premiered in 2022. The show is based on Mike Isaac's 2019 book of the same name.

Since 2022, he has portrayed Todd Phelps in the Disney+ series She-Hulk: Attorney at Law.

== Filmography ==
=== Film ===
Year	Title	Role	Notes
2012	Advice	Evan	Short film
2014	The Refrigerator	Howie	Short film
2015	Ratter	Greg	
2015	Jane Wants a Boyfriend	Steve	
2016	Loving	Philip Hirschkop	
2017	All Nighter	Trevor	
2017	Baywatch	Ronnie Greenbaum	
2017	Post-Party	Dylan	Short film
2017	Meet Cute	Nick	Short film
2017	Molly's Game	Shelly Habib	
2018	Dog Days	Garrett	
2019	Sword of Trust	Nathaniel	
2019	Plus One	Cartelli	
2022	Gatlopp: Hell of a Game	Cliff	
2023	Among the Beasts	Nathan	
2024	Carole & Grey	Grey	Also writer, director
2024	Bad Shabbos	David	
2026	Primetime	Ritchie	
2027	Alone at Dawn	TBA	Post-production

=== Television ===
Year	Title	Role	Notes
2014	Girls	Mo	Episode: "Only Child"
2014	Next Time on Lonny	Shady PA	Episode: "The End of Lonny"
2014	The Newsroom	Bree Dorrit	2 episodes
2015	Big Time in Hollywood, FL	Del Plimpton	Main role, 10 episodes
2016	American Horror Story: Roanoke	Milo	Episode: "Chapter 9"
2019–2023	Miracle Workers	Season 1: Sam; Season 2: Michael “Mikey” Shitshoveler; Season 3: Todd Aberdeen; Season 4: Scraps the dog	Main cast
2020	Cake	Himself	1 episode; segment: "Auditions: The Guy Before"
2022	Super Pumped	Garrett Camp	Main cast (Season 1), 7 episodes
2022	She-Hulk: Attorney at Law	Todd Phelps / HulkKing	4 episodes
2023	Grey's Anatomy	William Hudson	1 episode; season 19; episode 14
