= Skate Story =

2025 video game

- Developer: Sam Eng
- Publisher: Devolver Digital
- Producer: Juan de la Torre
- Composers: Blood Cultures; John Fio
- Platforms: macOS; Nintendo Switch 2; PlayStation 5; Windows
- Release: December 8, 2025
- Genre: Sports
- Mode: Single-player

Skate Story is a skateboarding video game developed by the American indie developer Sam Eng and published by Devolver Digital. The game was released for macOS, Nintendo Switch 2, PlayStation 5, and Windows on December 8, 2025. The game follows a demon in the Underworld who, after making a deal with the Devil, has to skate to the moon and swallow it to be freed.

== Gameplay ==
Skate Story focuses on the core mechanics of skateboarding and emphasizes fluid movement, exploration, and trick execution. Players take on the role of a skateboarding demon made out of glass and pain, who must ollie, kickflip and grind their way through 'The Underworld' as they take on their seemingly impossible quest. The control scheme of the game is designed to provide a realistic and intuitive skateboarding experience, with players able to perform a wide range of tricks and maneuvers. The game rewards players for creativity and skill, encouraging them to experiment with different combinations of tricks and routes through The Underworld. Players will need to complete skate trials in order to level up, learn new tricks, and obtain new gear. They can sell their soul for new decks, wheels, and trucks to customize their skateboard. Skate Story features puzzle-solving elements with its primary focus on exploration and discovery, encouraging players to piece the story together by progressing through the different levels and environments. While skating through the nine layers of Hell, the demon is accompanied by an atmospheric soundtrack by Blood Cultures and John Fio, creating an immersive environment.

== Synopsis ==
Skate Story is centered around a crystalline demon who is given a skateboard by the Devil alongs with the terms of a simple deal: if the demon skates to the Moon and swallows it, the Devil will free them. The game has a unique take on the skateboarding genre, as it is set in the underworld, where the demon must skate and grind its way through the ash and smoke of the Emptylands in order to consume the Moon. The protagonist encounters various tortured souls who need saving on their journey, such as a forgetful frog, and will need to skate fast in order to destroy the vicious demons on their path.

== Development ==
Skate Story is developed by Sam Eng, an indie video game developer based in New York. Eng previously developed Zarvot, a game about cubes which was released in 2018 for Nintendo Switch. Skate Story was announced during Devolver Digital's Public Access Holiday Special in December 2022 and with a planned release in 2023. The game was delayed to 2024, then again to 2025.

== Reception ==
Reception

Aggregate scores
Aggregator	Score
Metacritic	(NS2) 84/100 (PC) 85/100 (PS5) 80/100
OpenCritic	87% recommend (Note: Based on 79 reviews)

Review scores
Publication	Score
Destructoid	9/10
Eurogamer	5/5
Game Informer	8/10
GamesRadar+	3.5/5
IGN	8/10
Nintendo Life	8/10
Nintendo World Report	8.5/10
PC Gamer (US)	87/100
PCGamesN	9/10
Push Square	8/10
Shacknews	10/10
The Guardian	4/5
VideoGamer.com	9/10

Skate Story received "generally favorable" reviews according to review aggregator website Metacritic. OpenCritic reported that 87% of critics recommended the game.

=== Awards and nominations ===
Year	Award	Category	Result	Ref.
2026	New York Game Awards	Excelsior Award for Best New York Game	Nominated	
2026	28th Independent Games Festival Awards	Seumas McNally Grand Prize	Honorable mention	
2026	28th Independent Games Festival Awards	Excellence in Audio	Honorable mention	
2026	28th Independent Games Festival Awards	Excellence in Visual Arts	Pending	
