= Carole & Grey =

- Directed by: Jon Bass
- Starring: Jon Bass; Mary Wiseman; Steve Buscemi; Rosaline Elbay; Dario Ladani Sanchez; Daniel Radcliffe
- Release date: 2024
- Country: United States
- Language: English
- Budget: $10,000

Carole & Grey is a 2024 feature film that was made for TikTok and released in 45 episodes. Written by and starring Jon Bass, it also starred Mary Wiseman, Steve Buscemi, Rosaline Elbay, Dario Ladani Sanchez, and Daniel Radcliffe.

The film is in black-and-white and was shot vertically which, at the time, was considered "experimental". It was completed in 13 days and premiered at the 28th Tallinn Black Nights Film Festival.

Steve Buscemi's role won him an award for Best Supporting Actor at the Seattle Film Festival.

== Cast ==
- Jon Bass as Grey
- Mary Wiseman as Carole
- Steve Buscemi as the Shapeshifter
- Rosaline Elbay as Sylvie
- Dario Ladani Sanchez as Dario
- Daniel Radcliffe as the Narrator
