= Travis Kalanick =

American entrepreneur and former CEO of Uber

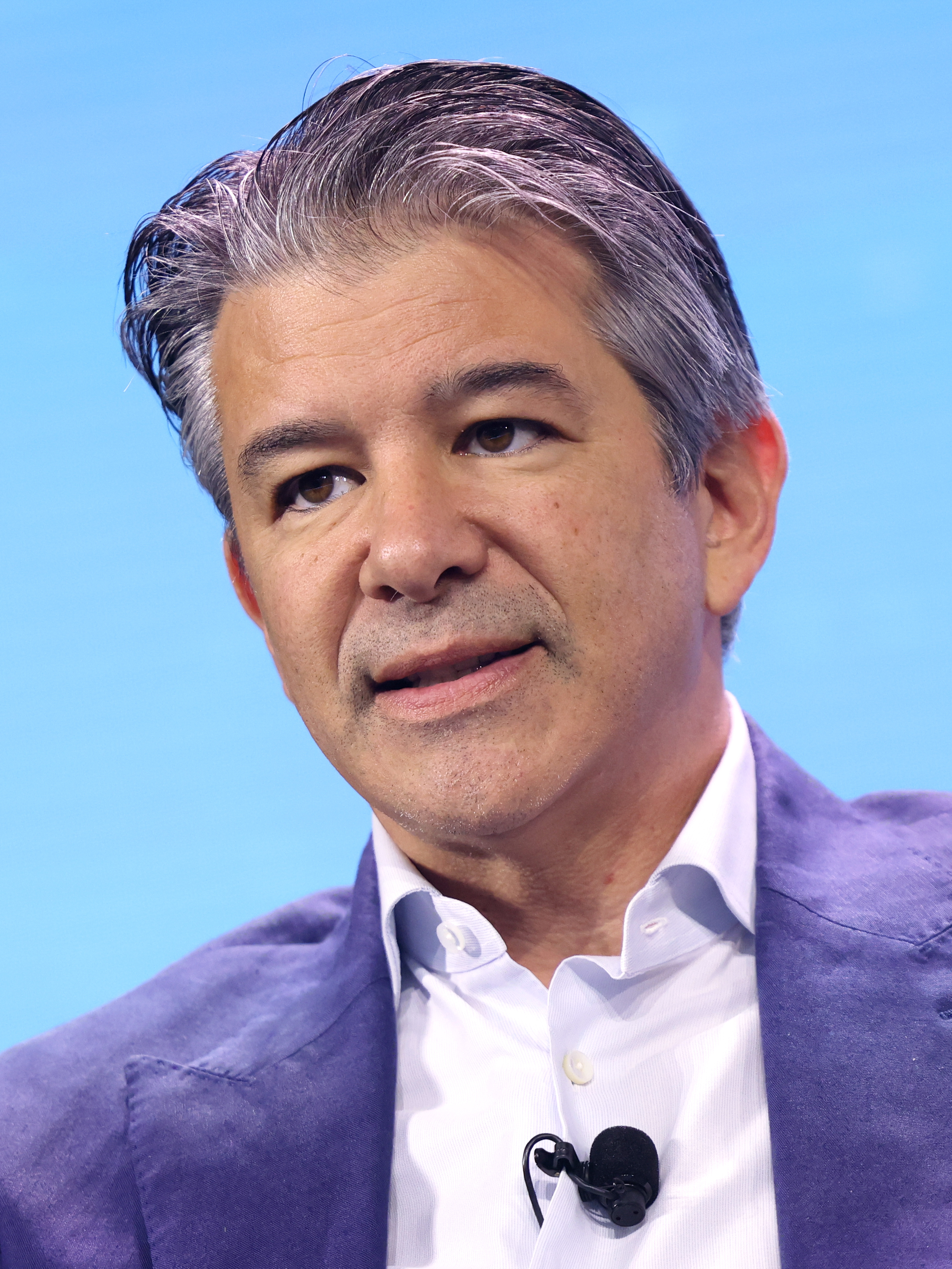
- Kalanick in 2026
- Born: August 6, 1976 (age 50); Los Angeles, California, U.S.
- Occupation: Internet entrepreneur
- Known for: Co-founder of Red Swoosh; Co-founder of Uber
- Title: CEO of Atoms
- Relatives: Allisyn Ashley Arm (half-niece)

Travis Cordell Kalanick (/ˈkælənɪk/; born August 6, 1976) is an American businessman best known as the co-founder and former chief executive officer (CEO) of Uber. Previously he worked for Scour, a peer-to-peer file sharing application company, and was the co-founder of Red Swoosh, a peer-to-peer content delivery network that was sold to Akamai Technologies in 2007. He is currently CEO of Atoms, which owns CloudKitchens, operator of ghost kitchens.

Kalanick was CEO of Uber from 2010 to 2017. He resigned from Uber in 2017 after growing pressure from allegations that he ignored reports of sexual harassment at the company. Kalanick retained his seat on the board of directors until he gave it up on December 31, 2019. Before he resigned, Kalanick sold approximately 90% of his shares in Uber for $2.5 billion.

Kalanick is ranked 374th on the Forbes 400 list of richest Americans, with a net worth of $3.6 billion.

In 2018, Kalanick started the 10100 Fund to invest in e-commerce, innovation and real estate in emerging markets such as China and India. That same year, Kalanick announced an investment of nearly $150 million in real estate redevelopment company City Storage Systems (renamed to Atoms); he also announced that he would be its CEO.

== Early life and education ==
Kalanick was born on August 6, 1976, and grew up in the Northridge neighborhood of Los Angeles. Kalanick's parents are Donald Edward Kalanick and Bonnie Renée Horowitz Kalanick (née Bloom). Donald, from a Slovak–Austrian Catholic family whose grandparents immigrated to the United States from the Austrian city of Graz, was a civil engineer for the city of Los Angeles. Bonnie, whose family were Viennese Jews who immigrated to the U.S. in the early 20th century, worked in retail advertising for the Los Angeles Daily News. Kalanick has two half-sisters, one of whom is the mother of actress Allisyn Ashley Arm, and a brother who is a firefighter.

In middle and high school, Kalanick was known to be competitive and driven to win. As a teenager, Kalanick sold knives door-to-door for direct sales company Cutco. At 18, he started a test preparation company called "New Way Academy" with the father of a classmate. After graduating from Granada Hills Charter High School, Kalanick studied computer engineering and business economics at the University of California, Los Angeles (UCLA). While studying at UCLA, Kalanick was a member of Theta Xi fraternity. In 1998, he dropped out to work at the start-up Scour full-time.

== Early ventures ==
=== Scour (1998–2000) ===
In 1998, Kalanick, along with Michael Todd and Vince Busam, dropped out of UCLA to work for Dan Rodrigues, founder of Scour Inc., a multimedia search engine, and Scour Exchange, a peer-to-peer file sharing service. Kalanick handled sales and marketing for Scour. He has referred to himself as a co-founder of the company, but the other co-founders have disputed this.

After months of growth, Scour needed cash and sought funding from venture capital investors Ronald Burkle and Michael Ovitz. Negotiations were contentious and Ovitz eventually sued Scour for breach of contract. Scour was forced to accept unfavorable terms for the investment, and Ovitz acquired majority control over the company. The situation soured Kalanick's view of investor-founder relations.

In 2000, the Motion Picture Association of America (MPAA), the Recording Industry Association of America (RIAA), and the National Music Publishers Association (NMPA) brought a $250 billion lawsuit against Scour, alleging copyright infringement. In September 2000, Scour filed for Chapter 11 bankruptcy to protect itself from the lawsuit.

=== Red Swoosh (2001–2007) ===
In 2001, with Michael Todd, Kalanick started Red Swoosh, another peer-to-peer file-sharing company. Kalanick called it his "revenge business" against the MPAA and RIAA for the lawsuit that killed Scour. Kalanick's business model was that media companies would pay Red Swoosh to provide legitimate copies of media files to customers and the company developed technology to make the transfer of such large files more efficient. Kalanick had difficulty securing funding as the company was launched right after the dot-com bubble burst. As a result, Red Swoosh ran with minimal month-to-month cash flow, and by August 2001, some employees had gone months without a paycheck.

In September 2001, Red Swoosh used approximately $110,000 of the company's payroll tax withholdings to fund day-to-day operations. There are differing accounts of what led to the decision and the fallout that ensued. In 2014, Business Insider reported Kalanick had publicly accused co-founder Michael Todd of making the decision without his knowledge, while Todd stated it was a decision they made together. The article noted "an email sent by Kalanick at the time and obtained by Business Insider appears to demonstrate his participation in the tax plan." In a 2017 article for The New York Times, Mike Isaac reported that Kalanick and Todd made the decision together, and that "friends and advisors" had warned Kalanick that using tax withholdings in this way could be considered tax fraud. In his 2019 book Super Pumped, Isaac wrote that an unnamed employee made the decision, for which Kalanick was blamed following the employee's departure from the company. According to this version, it was only after the fact that he was advised it could be tax fraud. In the end, a second round of funding provided enough cash to repay the Internal Revenue Service, and no one was ever prosecuted.

The incident caused significant tension between the co-founders, and Todd left the company by the end of September that year. Kalanick accused him of trying to solicit a hiring offer for himself and other Red Swoosh employees with Sony Ventures behind Kalanick's back. Shortly after Todd's departure, Kalanick moved back into his parents' house in a bid to save money, later complaining that "it sucked", because he "wasn't getting ladies". Kalanick apparently went without a salary while at Red Swoosh for over three years.

By 2002, Red Swoosh was down to only two employees: Kalanick and former Scour engineer Evan Tsang. The company continued to have difficulty securing funding, surviving via a series of last-minute deals with various investors. In early 2005, Todd helped recruit Tsang to Google, resulting in public embarrassment for the already-struggling Red Swoosh and the loss of a potentially lucrative deal with AOL. After getting to know Kalanick during a contentious exchange on an internet forum later that year, American investor Mark Cuban invested $1.8 million into the company, leading to further investments from Cuban's contacts. Kalanick was able to hire more programmers, and c. 2006, he moved to Thailand with his software team for two months. In 2007, competitor Akamai Technologies acquired Red Swoosh for approximately $19 million. Kalanick made $2 million on the deal after taxes and moved to San Francisco.

=== Startup investments ===
In San Francisco, Kalanick used the money he had made from the sale of Red Swoosh to make small investments in startups. He positioned himself as a "fixer" for startup problems such as talking to investors or hiring new staff. He primarily invested in tech startups like Expensify, Livefyre, Crowdflower, and Formspring, treating his Castro District apartment – termed the "JamPad" – as an informal salon for young tech enthusiasts.

== Uber (2009–2019) ==
=== Founding and growth (2009–2014) ===
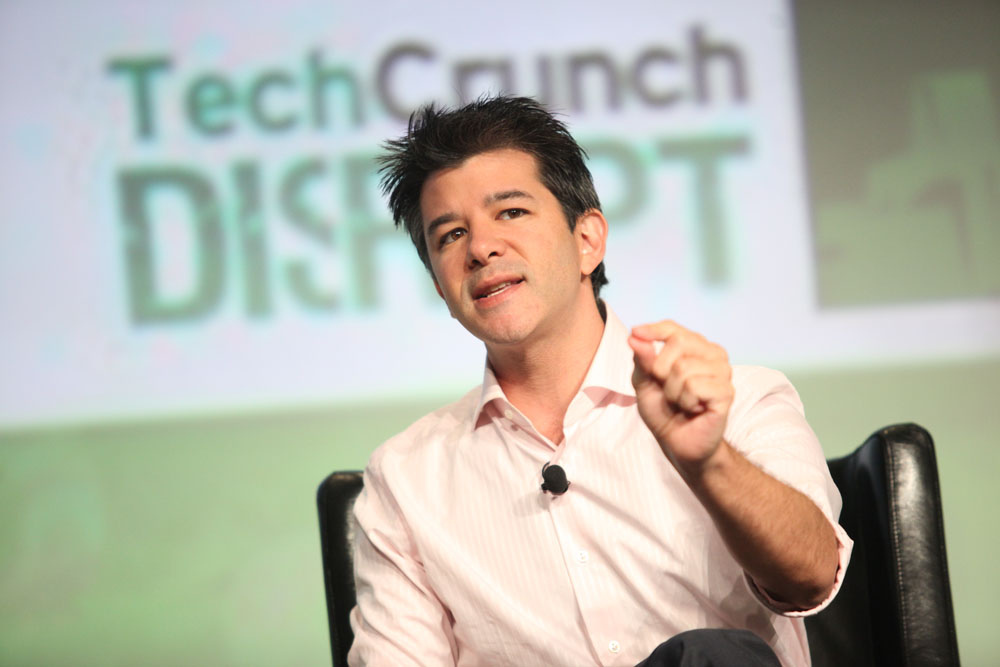
Kalanick speaking at TechCrunch Disrupt, 2012

In 2009, Kalanick co-founded ridesharing company Uber with Canadian entrepreneur Garrett Camp, co-founder of StumbleUpon. Camp, a frequent guest at Kalanick's home, had become frustrated with taxi services in San Francisco, and had found hiring drivers with upscale black car services inconvenient and expensive. Eventually he developed the concept of a smartphone app that could hail luxury vehicles directly from the user's smartphone. He discussed the concept with Kalanick, who agreed to act as a "mega advisor" to the company, originally called UberCab. As neither Camp nor Kalanick wanted to run the company directly, Ryan Graves was brought on as chief executive officer (CEO) at launch. He held the position for ten months before being removed in favor of Kalanick. Camp and Graves each signed over a large portion of their shares to Kalanick when he took the CEO position, giving him a significant degree of control over the company.

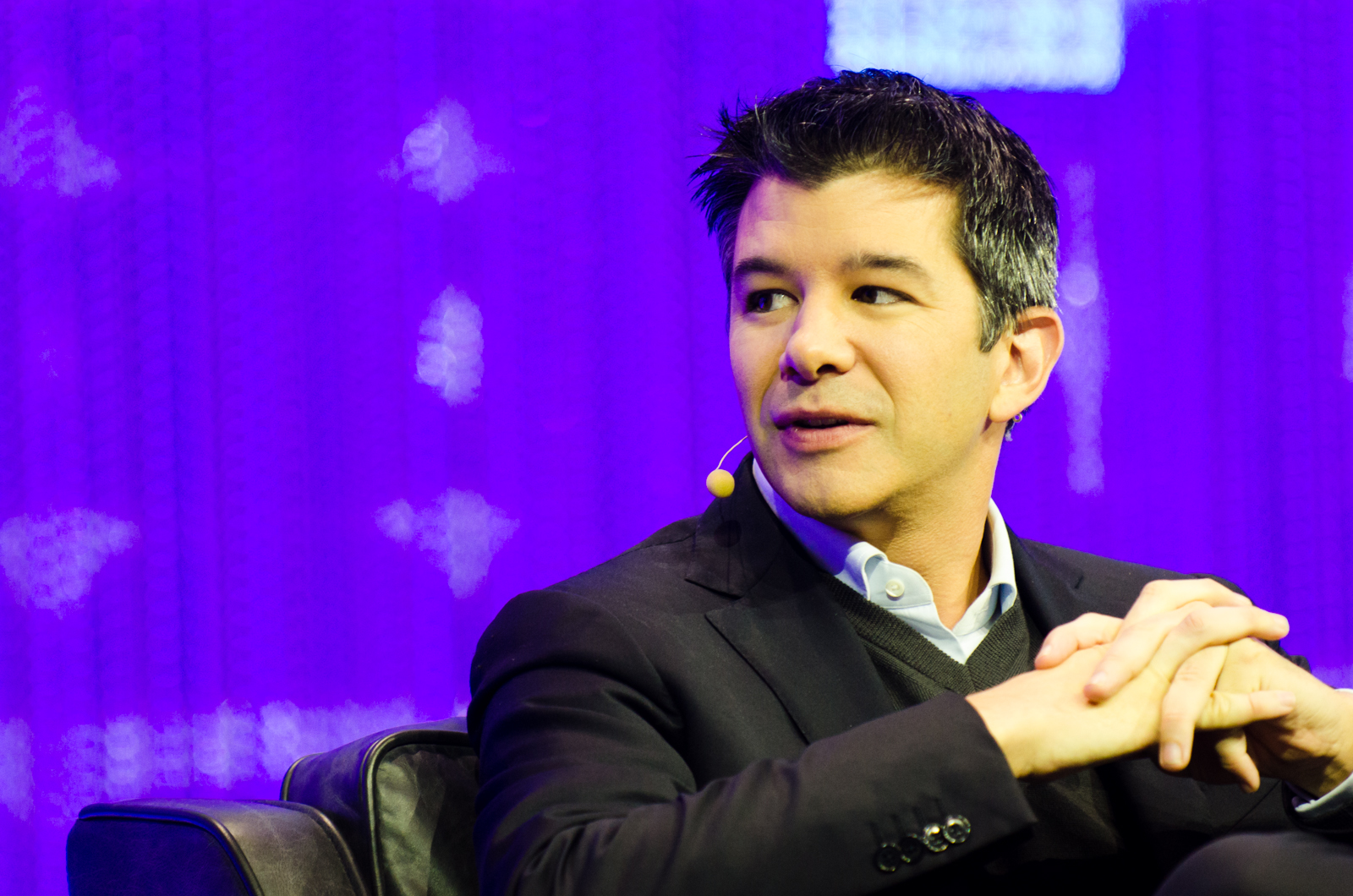
Kalanick speaking at the LeWeb conference in December 2013

In October 2010, the San Francisco Municipal Transportation Agency served UberCab with a cease and desist order, warning that they were in breach of regulations in the city and could face significant fines if they continued to operate as a taxicab company without appropriate permits. Kalanick directed the company to ignore the order and continue operating, but changed the company's name from UberCab to Uber to prevent it from being accused of falsely advertising itself as a taxi company. Kalanick believed that in addition to efficiency, Uber offered elegance because all drivers had fancy black cars. He did not feel regular cars would be attractive. When Wingz, Inc. launched in 2011 with the first ridesharing website in the world using regular drivers, he felt Wingz was illegal and contacted authorities to stop regular drivers from giving rides.

In February 2011, Kalanick met with Bill Gurley, an investor from venture capital firm Benchmark, and secured an $11 million investment for 20% of Uber (then valued at $50 million) for its Series A round of funding. The company embarked on its Series B round in late 2011, raising an additional $32 million. Kalanick's experiences with investors at Scour and Red Swoosh had made him wary of investors who might interfere with his control of Uber, so he ensured the terms for these and future investments strongly favored himself and Uber. He strictly limited the amount of financial information investors could access, and the shares for new investors had a tenth of the voting power of the shares held by Kalanick, Camp, and Graves. In April 2013, after Wingz, Lyft, and Sidecar obtained licenses to legally operate as rideshare companies, Uber announced it was going to adopt this model and add regular drivers with personal vehicles to the UberX platform instead of only commercially-licensed vehicles, subject to a background check, insurance, registration, and vehicle standards. By December 2013, the service operated in 65 cities. That same year, Kalanick obtained a $250 million investment from Google Ventures, with a valuation of $3.5 billion. Kalanick also made a point of undermining potential investments into competitor Lyft, poaching them for Uber.

=== Growing difficulties and exit from Uber (2014–2017) ===
By 2014, Kalanick's reputation was beginning to suffer as a result of his ruthless attitude towards competitors, regulators, customers, employees, and Uber's drivers. By this time, Gurley, once a supporter of Kalanick's, had become frustrated with his reckless corporate spending and overriding of the chief financial officer and chief legal officer. Corporate culture at Uber under Kalanick was grueling. Employees were expected to work nights and weekends regularly without additional compensation, and conference calls were often scheduled at all times of the night. Kalanick favored employees who were willing to do anything to advance in the company, even if it resulted in chronic infighting. He authorized the use of industrial espionage tactics against competitors and regulators, including the Greyball blacklisting program, and encouraged the development and use of rider-surveillance programs. Throughout his tenure as CEO, Kalanick had tight control over the company's board of directors, once telling Tim Cook from Apple that he had intentionally structured the board and hand-picked its members to allow him to "do what I want". In 2016, he negotiated an option to appoint another three board members at his discretion.

Journalists and the public alike criticized Kalanick regularly for setting Uber up with a "bro culture" awash in toxic masculinity, bullying, and misogyny, which in turn influenced attitudes in Silicon Valley generally. In a 2014 interview with men's magazine GQ, he joked the company should be called "Boob-er" for all the female attention it was bringing him; the remark was frequently criticized in the press as an example of his toxic masculinity. Executives were known to expense strip club visits to corporate accounts, a practice jokingly referred to as "Tits on Travis". Surveys commissioned by Uber public relations personnel in late 2016 showed customers appreciated Uber as a service, but had a strongly negative perception of Kalanick. Shortly after the survey results were first discussed at Uber in February 2017, Eric Newcomer at Bloomberg Businessweek published a video of Kalanick berating an Uber driver at the end of a ride, following a disagreement about falling driver income. Kalanick apologized for the incident to company employees in an email that was later posted to the company blog, stating that he felt he needed to "grow up". Later that year, Reuters reported Kalanick had developed "a reputation as an abrasive leader".

Sexual harassment and other forms of discrimination were rife at Uber corporate headquarters during Kalanick's tenure as CEO. The issues went unaddressed by the human resources department (HR), and Kalanick in particular was known to protect his favored employees from consequences for this type of behavior. Much of this behavior became public in early 2017. That February, it was reported Kalanick had full knowledge of sexual harassment allegations at Uber and did nothing. After these reports emerged, Kalanick announced Uber would "conduct an urgent investigation into these allegations". In the same week, Kalanick asked his newly hired direct report, SVP of Engineering Amit Singhal, to resign; Singhal had failed to disclose he had resigned from Google following sexual harassment claims. In March 2017, it was reported that in 2014, Kalanick was part of a group of Uber executives who visited a karaoke bar in Seoul that featured escorts. A female employee who was present made a complaint to HR, but little came of it. That summer, it emerged that Kalanick and other top Uber executives had accessed the private medical files of a woman who alleged she was raped by an Uber driver in India; Kalanick had made comments doubting her account as a result of information from the file.

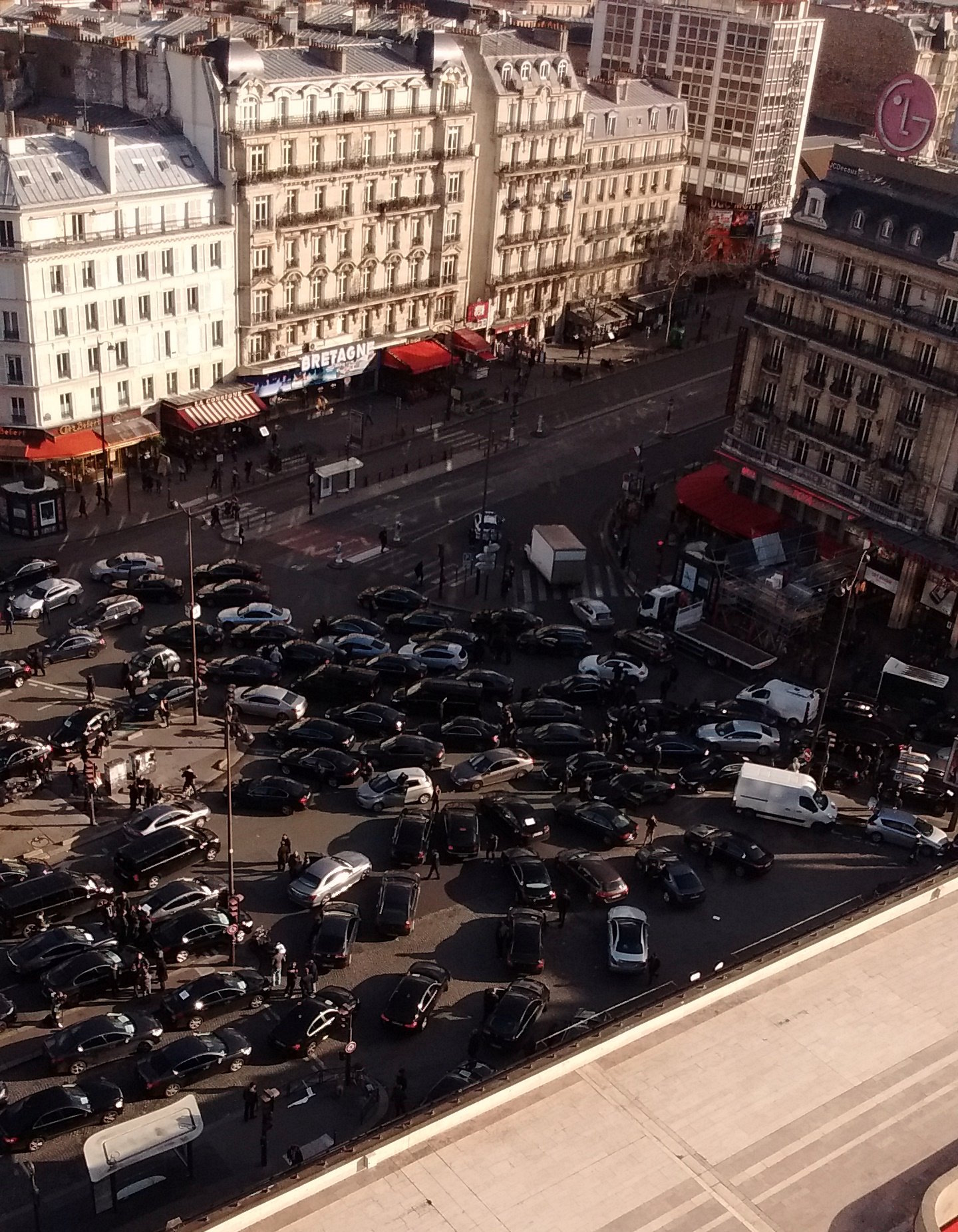
Uber drivers on strike at Montparnasse, Paris, February 2016

Although many drivers and corporate employees had requested the addition of a tipping option in the app for years, Kalanick opposed it, believing it interfered with the otherwise "frictionless" payment process. Following a pair of class-action lawsuits in California and Massachusetts about the employment status of drivers, Uber was mandated to explain its position on tips, which it did via a blog post that argued the "connection between tipping and quality of service can be weak. Many people tip because it's expected." Kalanick's refusal to allow for in-app tipping "contributed to the perception of Uber as the unfeeling, win-at-all-costs player in ride-hailing, particularly compared to Lyft", which did allow tipping.

In December 2016, it was announced that Kalanick would join several other high-profile CEOs as an economic advisor on for the Strategic and Policy Forum of President Donald Trump, organized by Stephen Schwarzman, a businessman with The Blackstone Group. Kalanick publicly opposed President Trump's executive order banning travel from select countries, but wrote in a news post on the Uber website that, as a member of the advisory council, he believed he would be able to directly address his concerns with the President and advocate for immigrants. After continued pressure, Kalanick announced in an email to Uber employees that he would step down from the council.

=== Resignation from Uber and Benchmark lawsuit (2017–2019) ===
At the end of May 2017, Kalanick's parents were involved in a boating accident that seriously injured his father and resulted in the death of his mother. On June 11, the final report of the independent investigation into Uber's sexual harassment issues was presented to Uber's top management. The scathing report was "hundreds of pages" long and included a dozen pages of recommendations, most prominently that Kalanick needed to take a leave of absence and reduce his level of control over Uber's operations. On June 13, 2017, it was announced that Kalanick would take an indefinite leave of absence from Uber, although he continued to work without the approval of the company's board. On June 20, 2017, Kalanick resigned as CEO after five major investors, including Benchmark Capital, demanded his resignation in a letter. Uber added an in-app tipping option a short time later.

Following his resignation, Kalanick retained his seat on Uber's board of directors. He continued to attempt to interfere with company operations by contacting employees and board members asking for internal company information and attempting to sway their voting regarding his replacement. The executive leadership threatened to quit en masse; Kalanick's access to company servers was stripped.

On August 10, 2017, Axios reported that Benchmark was suing Kalanick for "fraud, breach of contract and breach of fiduciary duty", in an attempt to remove Kalanick's residual right to name two further board members. Benchmark argued the agreement was invalid due to withholding of material information prior to the vote to allow him to do so. The lawsuit was controversial in Silicon Valley; it is unusual for an investor to sue a founder directly. The court ruled in favor of Kalanick to move the case to arbitration on August 30. In a public statement responding to the ruling, Kalanick said "Benchmark's false allegations are wholly without merit and have unnecessarily harmed Uber and its shareholders."

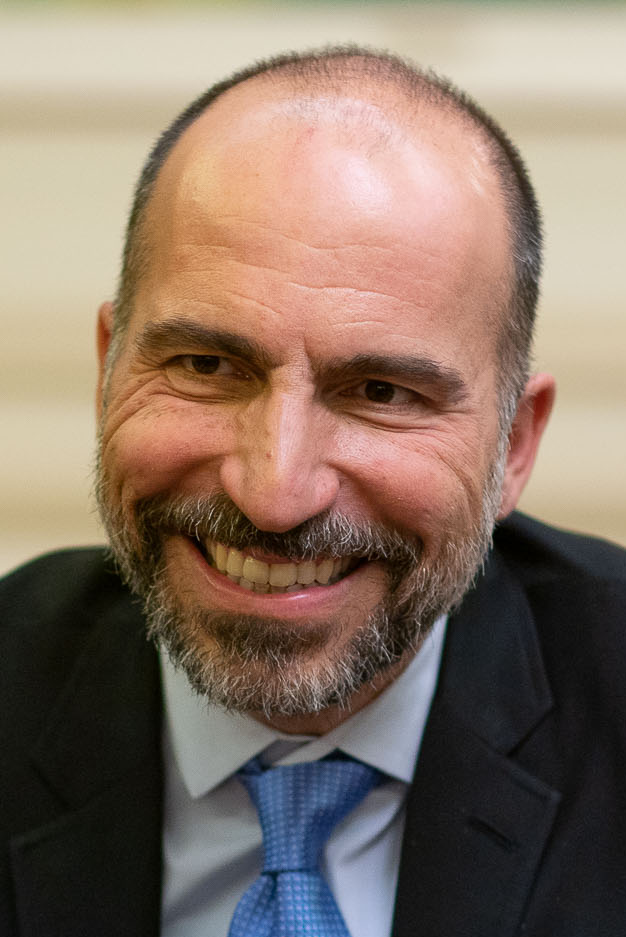
Dara Khosrowshahi, Kalanick's successor as CEO of Uber

Kalanick initially supported former General Electric CEO Jeff Immelt as his successor. Immelt was open to allowing Kalanick to retain some role in Uber's operations, while the other major candidate, Meg Whitman of Hewlett Packard Enterprise, intended to shut Kalanick out of any operational role. However, Kalanick soured on Immelt after Immelt's presentation went badly. Immelt pulled out of the running after one director privately told him he had no chance at getting the job. Kalanick unexpectedly threw his support behind a "dark horse" candidate, Expedia CEO Dara Khosrowshahi, even though Khosrowshahi had strongly opposed any further operational role for Kalanick. During his presentation, Khosrowshahi included a slide entitled, "There cannot be two CEOs."

Uber began to negotiate a tender offer with Japanese software conglomerate SoftBank in September 2017. The offer included an agreement to add six new seats to Uber's board, which would dilute Kalanick's influence over it. On September 29, Kalanick unilaterally appointed Ursula Burns and John Thain to the board. In January 2018, Benchmark dropped its lawsuit against Kalanick to allow the deal to proceed. The share purchase valued Uber at $48 billion.

On December 24, 2019, Kalanick announced his resignation from the board effective December 31, 2019. In the weeks leading up to this announcement, Kalanick sold more than $2.5 billion of Uber stock holding, which amounted to about 90% of his shares.

== 10100 venture fund ==
On March 7, 2018, Kalanick announced via his Twitter account that he would start a venture fund, 10100 (pronounced 'ten-one-hundred'), focused on job growth in emerging markets like China and India.

== City Storage Systems investment and CEO role ==
Shortly after the announcement of his venture fund, Kalanick announced his fund had invested $150 million in City Storage Systems (CSS), a company focused on the redevelopment of distressed real estate assets; he also announced he would serve as its CEO. CSS subsidiary CloudKitchens, a ghost kitchen managing company, took a controlling interest in U.K.-based startup FoodStars in June 2018. Kalanick personally invested $300 million in the startup, and in November 2019, Saudi Arabia's sovereign wealth fund completed an agreement with CloudKitchens in January 2019 to invest $400 million in the company. In January 2022, the company had raised new funding valued at $15 billion.

On March 13, 2026, Kalanick announced a new company, Atoms, which absorbed CloudKitchens, with a focus on robotics.

== Neom advisory role ==
Since 2018, Kalanick has been on an advisory board for Neom, Saudi Arabia's plan to build a futuristic "mega city" in the desert. As of 2026, plans for Neom have been substantially scaled back, with only a handful of structures built and multiple construction contracts terminated.

== Personal life ==
Kalanick owns a townhouse in the upper hills of San Francisco's Castro District, which was nicknamed "the Jam Pad" and had its own Twitter account. In 2019, Kalanick purchased a penthouse in 565 Broome Street, New York City for $36.4 million. In April 2020, he bought a home in Los Angeles for $43.3 million.

Kalanick dated Gabi Holzwarth, a violist and business development manager, from 2014 to late 2016. In 2017, Holzwarth told HuffPost she was "glad to be out of Uber's orbit", which she described as a deeply misogynistic environment and an "unhealthy world of impossible standards" that was damaging to her psyche, as she had dealt with eating disorders for years. Holzwarth did, however, praise Kalanick for helping her recover from her eating disorders.

Kalanick has been described as a passionate libertarian and a fan of author Ayn Rand. However, Kalanick supported Obamacare because it allows Uber drivers, as independent contractors, to maintain health insurance as they transition between jobs.

== In popular culture ==
In the Showtime series Super Pumped (2022), Kalanick is portrayed by Joseph Gordon-Levitt.
