= Better Place =

Better Place may refer to:

- Better Place (company), a former transport company
- "Better Place" (Saint Asonia song), 2015
- "Better Place" (Rachel Platten song), 2016
- "Better Place (9.11)", a song by Michelle Williams from Heart to Yours, 2002
- "Better Place" (NSYNC song), from the film Trolls Band Together, 2023

== See also ==
- A Better Place (disambiguation)
