= Aly Kassem =

Egyptian actor

- على قاسم
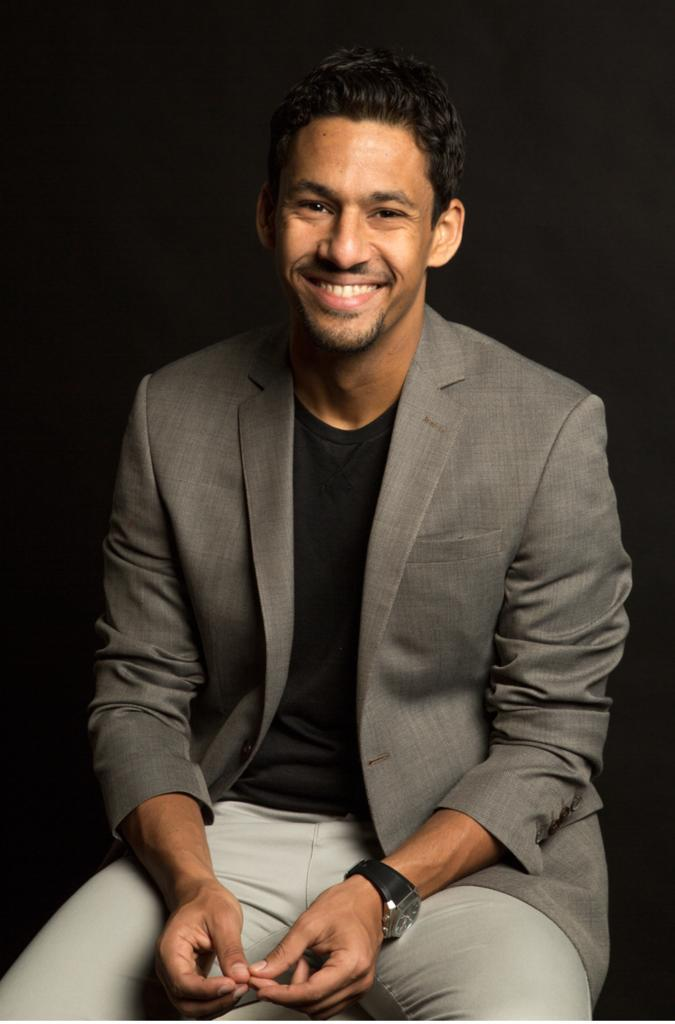
- Aly Kassem in April 2021
- Born: Cairo, Egypt
- Occupation: Actor
- Years active: 2018–present

Aly Kassem (Arabic: على قاسم) is an Egyptian actor.

== Life and career ==
Kassem studied engineering at Cairo University and was a dedicated athlete, participating in triathlons. He decided to pursue acting full-time in 2016, landing his first starring role in Amr Salama's 2018 television series Tayea. He has since received critical acclaim for his roles in Karim El Shenawy's Qabeel; Forgetfulness (Luebet Al Nesyan) directed by Hani Khalifa, Karim El Shenawy's Seventh-Year Itch, and Marwan Hamed's Kira & El Gin. He is next set to star in Mohammed Diab's upcoming film Assad.

In 2021, Kassem starred in the music video for rapper Lege-Cy's "Arafa".

Kassem is married, and he and his wife have a cat. He has anxiety and is an advocate for therapy.
