= Scour Inc. =

Former multimedia Internet search engine company

- Website type: Web search engine
- Website: www.Scour.com at the Wayback Machine (archived February 29, 2000)
- Launched: November 3, 1997; 29 years ago
- Current status: Closed

Scour Inc. was a multimedia Internet search engine, and provided Scour Exchange, an early peer-to-peer file exchange service.

== History ==
Scour was founded by five students (Vince Busam, Michael Todd, Dan Rodrigues, Jason Droege and Kevin Smilak) from the Computer Science Department of the University of California, Los Angeles (UCLA) in December 1997. By mid-1998 Ilya Haykinson and Travis Kalanick, also Computer Science students at UCLA joined the founding team. It moved into the spotlight a year later when in June 1998, Scour received its first investment from former Disney president Michael Ovitz and Ron Burkle of Yucaipa companies.

The company's early products were an SMB search engine and Scour Media Agent, a Windows application to download files from SMB shares. The search engine would probe IP addresses for publicly shared files and then index them for download by other users.

In 1998, the company developed a web search engine as well, crawling the World Wide Web for links to multimedia audio, video and images.

In 1999 Scour received an investment from Michael Ovitz and the Yucaipa Company, an investment arm of the billionaire Ronald Burkle. Together, the total investment represented a controlling share in the company. After the investment, Scour expanded in terms of product offerings and personnel. The company launched a software product named MyCaster which allowed users to stream audio over the network, optionally mixing microphone input with an MP3 audio file in real time.

Faced with the increasing popularity of Napster, Scour developed a competing peer-to-peer service named Scour Exchange. Unlike Napster, the Scour software supported video and images in addition to just audio files, and integrated all users into one network. The company also tied its web site promotional materials to the Scour Exchange software and attempted to leverage its web and SMB indexes in providing additional search results inside the Scour Exchange application.

In the summer of 2000 the Motion Picture Association of America, the Recording Industry Association of America (RIAA) and the National Music Publishers Association (NMPA) brought a lawsuit against Scour, alleging copyright infringement. Despite Scour's declarations of innocence, the company was not able to raise money to continue operations. They laid off most of its staff in September of that year and filed for bankruptcy protection, to protect the company from the lawsuit, shortly afterwards. The company's assets went up for auction and, following a bidding war, all assets were purchased by Centerspan Communications of Portland, Oregon in late December of that year.

== Scour metasearch engine ==
Scour has since relaunched in early 2008 as a metasearch engine combining the three most used search engines—Google, Yahoo! and Live Search—into a single aggregated search page with social concepts. Scour rewards users with a point for each unique search conducted through the Scour Toolbar or at the website, as well as for commenting or rating a result (to a maximum of three points per search). Points can also be acquired through use of its affiliate program, with a matching 25% commission given to the host of the referral. Once users have accumulated a certain number of points they can be redeemed for a Visa gift card or PayPal money transfer at an implied exchange rate of approximately USD0.004 (2/5¢) a point. The rate for those not in its target demographic, however, is significantly less—only USD0.0001 per point. The program was cancelled in the summer of 2009.

== Scour redirect virus ==
Since as early as 2009 a web browsing virus related to Scour surfaced. This virus hijacks the web browser being used and automatically redirects the user to Scour's search engine. Other websites have been reported to be redirected to as well with Scour being the primary one. The user's browser is redirected to scour.com after clicking a link, usually from Google.
