= Susan Rigetti =

American software engineer and author

- Born: Susan Joy Fowler; April 17, 1991 (age 35)
- Education: University of Pennsylvania
- Occupations: Writer and editor, previously software engineer
- Spouse: Chad Rigetti (m. 2017)
- Children: 2
- Writing career
- Years active: 2016–present
- Subjects: Technology industry, Software engineering
- Website: susanrigetti.com

Susan Joy Fowler Rigetti (née Fowler; born April 17, 1991) is an American writer and ex-software engineer known for her role in influencing institutional changes in how Uber and Silicon Valley companies treat sexual harassment. Her business celebrity led to book and Hollywood film deals based on her experience.

She worked at two technology startup companies before joining Uber in late 2015. In early 2017, her blog post on sexual harassment at the company was widely shared and ultimately led to the ouster of Uber founder and CEO Travis Kalanick.

Following her career in software engineering, she served as editor-in-chief of a quarterly publication by the payment processing company Stripe, as a technology opinion editor at The New York Times, and as the editor of Slate's "Future Tense" column.

== Early life ==
Rigetti was raised in rural Yarnell, Arizona, the second of seven children. Her father was an evangelical Assemblies of God preacher and pay phone salesman, and her mother homeschooled their children. Rigetti recalled having little direction in her education, and would often visit the library and try to teach herself topics. She was influenced by Plutarch's Lives and the Stoics, which encouraged her to focus on the parts of her life she could control. She worked as a stable hand and nanny to make money for her family.

Rigetti prepared herself to take college entrance exams without high school and was accepted with a full scholarship to Arizona State University, where she wanted to pursue astronomy. However, her lack of high school prerequisites prevented her study of math and physics, so she transferred to the University of Pennsylvania, where Rigetti faced similar opposition until she appealed to the university president.

She worked as a physics research assistant during her time at Penn, but was forced out after befriending a fellow student named Tim. When Tim turned suicidal, Rigetti tried to seek help, but the university put the blame on her and tried to remove Rigetti from classes they shared. The university also rescinded her master's degree. She considered suing, but decided to move on with her life. This incident later helped Rigetti make the decision to blow the whistle on Uber. She graduated with a degree in physics.

== Career ==
=== Technology industry ===
Rigetti was a platform engineer at financial technology company Plaid in early 2015, where she learned her male peers were being paid $50,000 more than she was. Later in 2015, she joined data infrastructure company PubNub as a DevOps engineer, where her boss made statements that led Rigetti to believe he "truly, deeply, passionately hated women".

==== Uber ====
Rigetti joined Uber as a Site Reliability Engineer in November 2015.

In February 2017, Rigetti wrote a 3,000-word blog post on sexual harassment at Uber. Rigetti's post outlined a hostile work culture for female employees of Uber. She recounted how the company's human resources refused to punish her former manager, who had propositioned her for sex, based on his productivity. The story was shared 22,000 times on Twitter. External probes confirmed her account and led to multiple firings. The fallout ultimately forced Uber founder and CEO Travis Kalanick to resign, and a subsequent backlash against sexual harassment in Silicon Valley, including the removal of tech investors Dave McClure and Justin Caldbeck.

Rigetti's role in changing Uber made her into a business world celebrity. She has received book and Hollywood film deals and continues to work towards legislation and workplace protections for women. In August 2017, she petitioned the United States Supreme Court to consider her experience in its decision on whether employees can forfeit rights to collective litigation in their employment contracts. Vanity Fair named her among their 2017 list of top business and cultural leaders.

Rigetti was one of five women featured on the cover of Time magazine's Person of the Year issue for 2017, as representative of "The Silence Breakers", for reporting on the sexual harassment she experienced at Uber. She was also named Financial Times Person of the Year by the British business newspaper Financial Times.

=== Journalism ===
In 2017, Rigetti joined the payment processing company Stripe as the editor-in-chief of a new quarterly publication called Increment. She also started a science book club and published a book on microservices. In 2018, Rigetti became an opinion editor for The New York Times writing op-ed pieces on tech subjects.

Rigetti was the editor of Slate's "Future Tense" column from 2023–2024.

== Personal life ==
Susan married Chad Rigetti, founder of Rigetti Computing, in 2017. They have two children.

== Works ==
- Susan Fowler, Production-Ready Microservices (2016)
- Susan Fowler, Whistleblower: My Journey to Silicon Valley and Fight for Justice at Uber (2020)
- Susan Rigetti, Cover Story: A Novel (2020)
