= Wingz (company) =

Vehicle for hire company

Wingz, Inc.
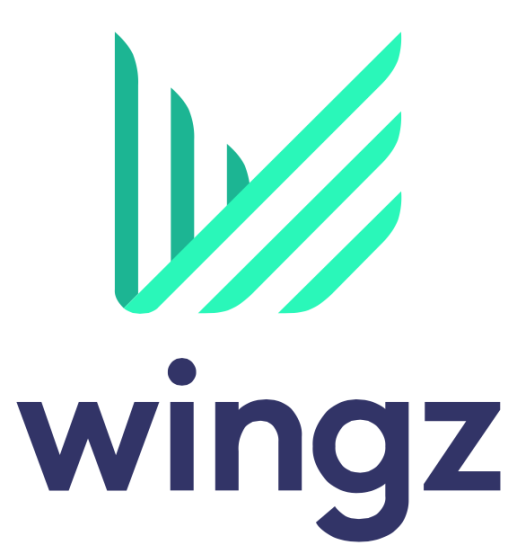
- Industry: Vehicle for hire
- Founded: February 22, 2011; 15 years ago
- Founder: Christof Baumbach; Jeremie Romand; Fred Gomez; Geoff Mathieux
- Headquarters: San Francisco, U.S.
- Website: wingz.com

Wingz, Inc. is a ridesharing company that provides transportation services across the United States. The service provides rides focused on healthcare and non-emergency medical transportation (NEMT).

The company is based in San Francisco, California.

== Safety ==
=== Drivers ===
Wingz drivers undergo an extensive vetting and credentialing process that involves a more thorough assessment than traditional rideshare services, resulting in less than 5% of drivers being accepted into the program.

== History ==
=== Establishment ===
Wingz (originally known as Tickengo) was founded by Geoff Mathieux, Jeremie Romand, Fred Gomez and Christof Baumbach in April 2011. Tickengo was originally a ride-sharing platform matching drivers and passengers going to the same destination.

In October 2011, Tickengo was the first company in the world to introduce the concept of a peer-to-peer ride online platform, where non-commercial drivers could accept any posted ride request to make some money, even if they were not going to the same destination. This was made available through the Tickengo website.

In October 2012, Tickengo received a "cease and desist" letter from the California Public Utilities Commission (CPUC). The company was the first to submit a brief to the CPUC arguing for the legalization of ridesharing companies.

In November 2013, California regulators formally legalized ride-sharing services, classifying them as “Transportation Network Companies”. Thus, Tickengo was the first company in the world to get a license for ride-sharing, before Lyft and Uber obtained theirs. In early 2014 Tickengo rebranded as Wingz.

Willie Brown, former mayor of San Francisco, served as lawyer and advisor to Wingz, representing the company before the California Public Utilities Commission.

=== Funding ===
In March 2015, Wingz announced that it had raised $2.7M in equity funding from Ocotea Holdings, Florence Ventures, Blue Angels Ventures, Big Bloom Investments, Binux Capital, Bright Success Capital Limited, Olive Tree, Jack Russo, David Chen, Vincent Ma, Larry Marcus, Xavier Niel and other angel investors.

In July 2015, Wingz received an additional $11M in equity funding from Expedia Group, Altimeter Capital and Marc Benioff, CEO of Salesforce.com.
