= StumbleUpon =

Discovery and advertisement engine

- Website type: Website ranking and discovery
- Available in: English
- Founded: November 2001; 25 years ago
- Dissolved: June 30, 2018; 8 years ago
- Headquarters: San Francisco, California, United States
- Founder: Garrett Camp; Geoff Smith
- Website: Archived official website at the Wayback Machine (archive index)
- Registration: Yes
- Current status: Defunct
- Native clients on: Toolbar: Firefox, Google Chrome, Opera, Internet Explorer, Safari; Mobile apps: Windows, iOS, Android, Amazon Appstore
- Content license: Proprietary freeware

StumbleUpon was a website, browser extension, toolbar, and mobile app with a "Stumble!" button that, when pushed, opened a semi-random website or video that matched the user's interests, similar to a random web search engine. Users were able to filter results by type of content and were able to discuss such webpages via virtual communities and to rate such webpages via like buttons. StumbleUpon was shut down in June 2018.

== History ==
=== Founders and funding ===
StumbleUpon was founded in November 2001 by Garrett Camp, Geoff Smith, Justin LaFrance and Eric Boyd during Camp's time in graduate school at the University of Calgary. A prototype was ready by February 2002 and, with great reviews, the extension was installed by thousands of users daily. However, at the time, the company did not advertise or generate much revenue.

In September 2005, Camp met Silicon Valley investor Brad O'Neill, who provided early funding to the company, assisted the company with a move to San Francisco, and introduced the company to other angel investors that led to $1.2 million of investments. These investors included Tim Ferriss, Ram Shriram of Google, Mitch Kapor of Mozilla Foundation, First Round Capital and Ron Conway and the company was then valued at approximately $4 million. In February 2006, the company used part of the new investments to move to offices in South of Market, San Francisco.

=== Product development ===
On December 13, 2006 StumbleUpon launched StumbleVideo. The site allowed users without a toolbar to "stumble" through all the videos that toolbar users had submitted and rate them using an Ajax interface. The site aggregated videos from CollegeHumor, Dailymotion, FunnyOrDie, Google, MetaCafe, MySpace, Vimeo, and YouTube.

On February 12, 2007, StumbleUpon launched a version of StumbleVideo that ran on the Wii console, optimized for the Wii's Opera browser.

In April 2007, StumbleUpon launched the StumbleThru service, allowing users of the toolbar to stumble within websites such as those of Flickr, MySpace, Wikipedia, YouTube, BBC, CNN, PBS, The Onion, and Phys.org.

=== eBay ownership ===
In late 2006, the company received informal acquisition offers and on May 30, 2007, the company was sold to eBay for over $75 million. At the time, StumbleUpon had about 2.3 million users. The attraction for eBay was "similarities in our approaches to the concept of community" according to senior eBay director, Michael Buhr, who took over as general manager. The company's management team remained in place.

In July 2007, StumbleUpon was named as one of the 50 best websites by Time. In April 2008, the company had 5 million registered users, and by the end of May it collected its five-billionth "stumble", more than one billion of which took place in early 2008. In March 2009, StumbleUpon launched Su.pr, a URL shortening service, primarily to link to Twitter and Facebook statuses and updates.

=== Buyout and peak popularity ===
In April 2009, Garrett Camp, Geoff Smith and other investors including Ram Shriram re-acquired the company for $29 million. eBay released a statement on its website saying ". . . it has become apparent that there are few long-term, strategic synergies between StumbleUpon and the eBay Inc. portfolio".

In 2009, StumbleUpon drove more traffic to webpages than any other social media site in the US, including Facebook, YouTube, Twitter, Digg, Reddit, and Pinterest.

In May 2010, StumbleUpon report to have more than 10 million members.

In March 2011, the company raised $17 million from investors including Accel Partners, August Capital, DAG Ventures, First Round Capital and Sherpalo Ventures.

In March 2011, the company launched Paid Discovery, its advertising platform, whereby users were redirected to the webpages of advertisers, which were disclosed as sponsored content.

In August 2011, StumbleUpon reached the 25 billion stumble mark and was adding over 1 billion stumbles per month.

In August 2011, the company added the "StumbleUpon Explore Box", where users could enter a specific interest and be redirected to a related website that has been evaluated by the StumbleUpon community.

On October 24, 2011, StumbleUpon deleted years' worth of user-generated content, and removed HTML blogging, standalone blog posts, and photoblogging capabilities. Additionally, all previous blog posts were converted from HTML to plain text, and all photos were deleted from previous blog posts.

In December 2011, the company launched a major redesign, including offering tools to allow users to have more control over content. In the month following the redesign, traffic fell 25%.

In April 2012, StumbleUpon announced that it had over 25 million registered users.

In September 2012, StumbleUpon released an update for its iOS app that added "StumbleDNA," which aggregated content that was recommended for the user, trending content as well, as a section where users could view the activity of their StumbleUpon connections. It also released a redesign of its website in beta release, and extended it to all users on October 24.

=== Decline ===
On January 16, 2013, StumbleUpon laid off approximately 32% of its staff, reducing it from 110 to 75 employees. In July 2013, StumbleUpon discontinued the su.pr service.

On September 24, 2013, StumbleUpon acquired 5by, a mobile app founded by Greg Isenberg that recommends videos based on user interests. The service was shut down in December 2015.

In October 2014, the company introduced a feature to allow users to chat about webpages that they discovered using StumbleUpon.

In August 2015, a majority stake in the company was re-acquired by Garrett Camp.

=== Closure ===
StumbleUpon was shut down in June 2018 and its accounts were transitioned to Mix.com, another content discovery venture built in part through Camp's studio startup company, Expa.

== See also ==
- Rockmelt
- Social bookmarking
- Web 2.0
- Webring
