= A Better Place (upcoming film) =

Upcoming feature film

- Directed by: Anton Sigurðsson
- Written by: Anton Sigurðsson
- Produced by: Theo Rossi; Wes Hull; Diana Hull; Erlingur Jack Gudmundsson; Anton Sigurðsson
- Starring: Billy Campbell; Theo Rossi; Rosaline Elbay
- Country: United States
- Language: English

A Better Place is an upcoming feature film starring Billy Campbell, Theo Rossi and Rosaline Elbay. It is directed by Anton Sigurðsson and is described as a "dark comedy thriller".

Regarding the casting of Rossi, Campbell and Elbay as "a disgraced deputy, his anxious partner, and a sharp-tongued female prisoner who cover up a hit-and-run", producer Diana Hull stated, "each [are] delivering what we believe is the best work of their careers."

Filming wrapped in Las Cruces, Southern New Mexico in May 2025, with the production reportedly employing over 100 New Mexico residents.
