= Garrett Camp =

Canadian billionaire entrepreneur (born 1978)

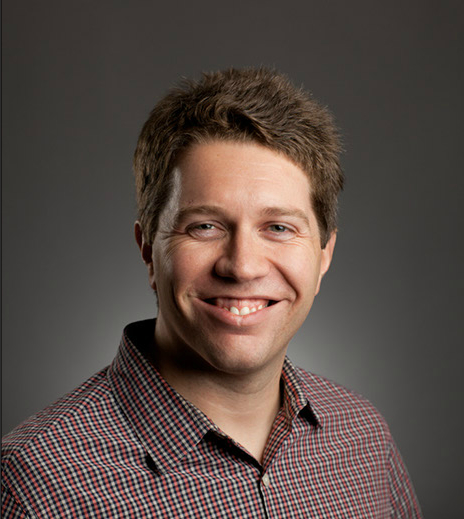
- Camp in 2018
- Born: October 4, 1978 (age 48); Calgary, Alberta, Canada
- Citizenship: France, Canada
- Education: University of Calgary (BSc, MSc)
- Occupations: Businessman; investor; software engineer
- Title: Founder of Expa; Co-founder & Board member of Uber; Founder & Chairman of StumbleUpon
- Website: garrettcamp.com

Garrett Camp (born October 4, 1978) is a Canadian-French businessman, investor, and software engineer. He helped build the search engine StumbleUpon and is a co-founder of Uber. He lives in Los Angeles.

== Early life and education ==
Camp was born and raised in Calgary, Alberta, Canada. His father was an economist, and his mother an artist; both later became home builders. In 2001 he graduated from the University of Calgary with a bachelor's degree in electrical engineering. Later he earned a master's degree in software engineering with a focus on collaborative systems, evolutionary algorithms, and information retrieval.

== Career ==
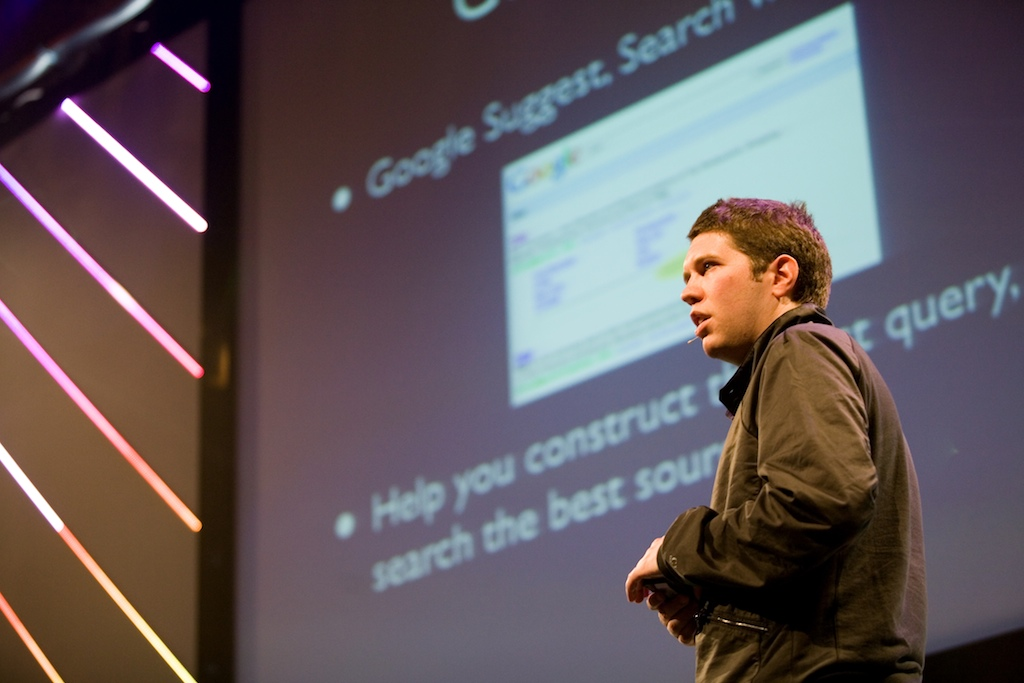
Camp at the 2008 The Next Web Conference in Amsterdam

In 2002, Camp co-founded StumbleUpon. It was the first personalized search engine platform. In 2007, StumbleUpon was acquired by eBay and in 2009 StumbleUpon was spun-out. Following its spin-off, Camp worked to expand its services and grow the company. In 2012, Camp left StumbleUpon.

In 2014, Camp founded Expa Labs with the goal of growing new companies. In 2015, Camp reacquired StumbleUpon. It operated until 2018, when it transitioned to Mix, a venture built in part through Expa Labs.

=== Uber ===
In 2009, Camp founded Uber as UberCab In 2011, the company continued to expand across the United States and abroad. In 2020, Camp left Uber's board of directors but remained a board observer.

In 2022, Camp was portrayed by actor Jon Bass in Super Pumped, a drama series based on Uber.

=== Investments ===
In the past, Camp has invested in Prism Skylabs; and BlackJet, an on-demand private aviation service.

== Awards and honors ==
In 2007, Camp was named to the List of Top Innovators under the age of 35 at Technology Review's Emerging Technologies Conference at MIT. In 2008, Camp was named by Bloomberg Businessweek as one of Tech's Best Young Entrepreneurs. In 2013, Camp was honored at the Tribeca Disruptive Innovation Awards for his accomplishments at both StumbleUpon and Uber.

== Personal life ==
In 2015, Camp was the 283rd-richest person in the world and the third-richest Canadian, with an estimated wealth of US$5.3 billion, according to Forbes. As of February 2024, Camp's net worth is calculated at US$6.18 billion, making him the fifteenth-richest Canadian, according to the Bloomberg Billionaires Index.

In 2017, Camp joined The Giving Pledge, a commitment to give away half of his wealth to charity. Garrett Camp's Camp Foundation funds nonprofit projects such as Every.org, a nonprofit which provides technology to other nonprofits to accept donations in stock, crypto, DAFs, and cash.

In June 2019, after Camp purchased a mansion in Trousdale Estates of Beverly Hills for $72.5 million, Uber drivers struggling for higher pay and better working conditions picketed his home.
