= Icelandic Film Centre =

Icelandic public film institution

The Icelandic Film Centre
- Kvikmyndamiðstöð Íslands
- logo
- Formation: 2001
- Location: Iceland
- Website: www.icelandicfilmcentre.is

The Icelandic Film Centre (Icelandic: Kvikmyndamiðstöð Íslands) is a public institution that was established in 2001. The Film Centre provides grants from the Icelandic Film Fund and assists in the promotion of Icelandic films abroad. The staff of the Film Centre work to ensure that Icelandic films are shown at film festivals abroad. The Minister of Education appoints the director for a five-year term. The current director is Laufey Guðjónsdóttir.

The Film Act states that the tasks of the Icelandic Film Centre are to:

1. Support the production and distribution of Icelandic films.
2. Facilitate the promotion, distribution and sale of Icelandic films in Iceland and abroad and gather information about Icelandic films and publish them.
3. Promote film culture in Iceland.
4. Promote increased communication with foreign parties in the field of film.
