= Karim El Shenawy =

Egyptian film director (born 1985)

- كريم الشناوي
- Born: 1985 (age 40–41); Cairo, Egypt
- Occupation: Director
- Years active: 2011–present

Karim El Shenawy (born 1985) is an Egyptian film director. He is best known for Lam Shamseya, Qabeel, Khalli Balak Min Zizi (Take Care of Zizi), El Harsha El Sabaa (The Seventh-Year Itch), and Eyar Nary (Gunshot).

Shenawy was born in 1985 and studied at the Faculty of Mass Communication at Cairo University before pursuing a master’s degree in Directing Fiction at Goldsmiths College, University of London. He worked as an assistant director on a number of critically acclaimed films, most notably Mohamed Diab's Clash (2016).

His first feature film, Eyar Nary (Gunshot), was released in 2018 and was followed by his first TV series, Qabeel, released in 2019. Shenawy has since become a frequent collaborator of acclaimed screenwriter Mariam Naoum.
