= Ryan Graves (businessman) =

American businessman

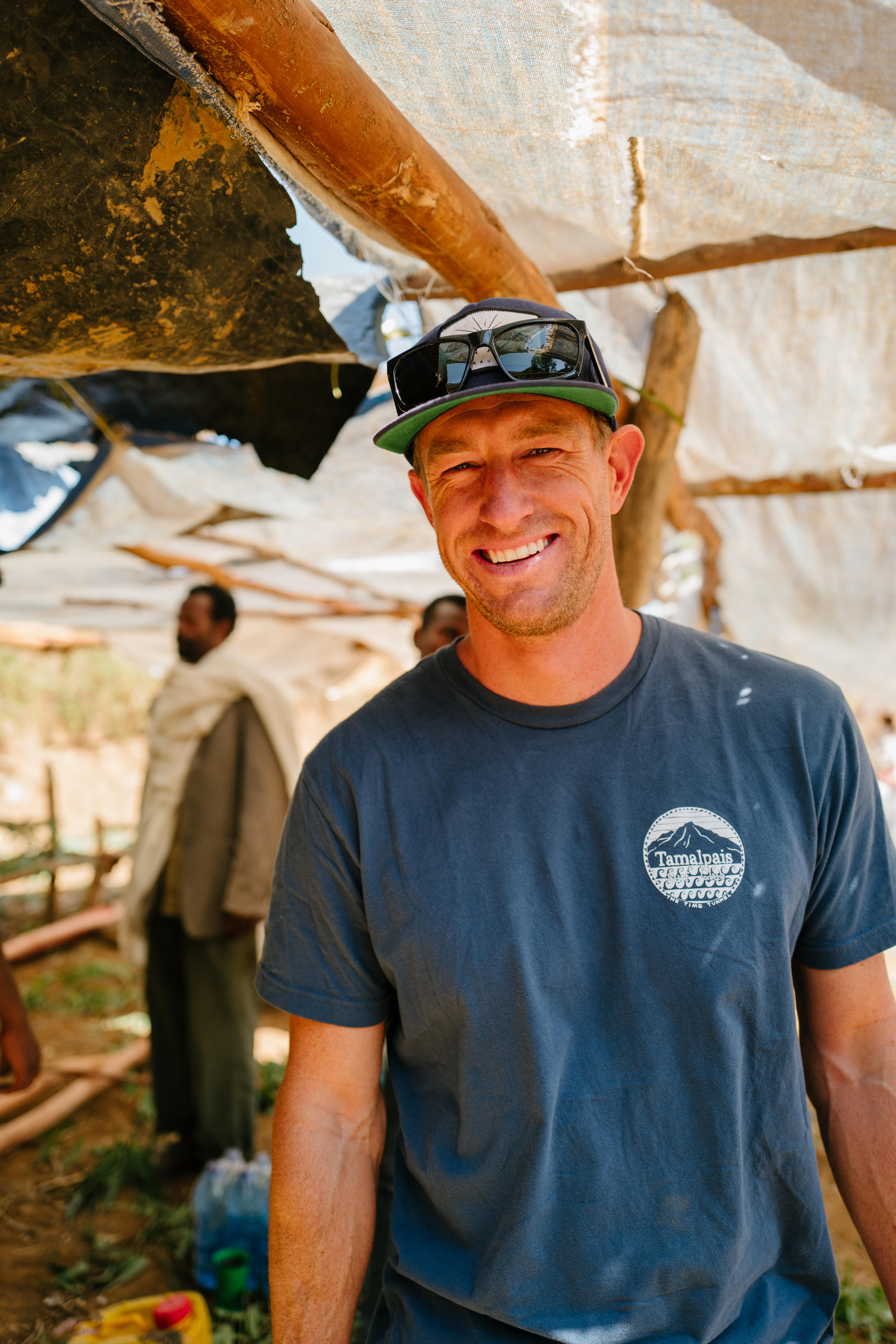
- Graves in 2018
- Born: 1983 (age 42–43); San Diego, California, US
- Education: Miami University (2006)
- Occupations: Founder & CEO, Saltwater; SVP, Uber (2010-2017); CEO, Uber (2010)
- Known for: First employee of Uber
- Board member of: Charity: Water; Metromile (2021–2022)
- Spouse: Molly Graves
- Children: 4

Ryan Graves (born 1983) is an American billionaire, a former CEO and member of the board of directors of Uber, and a current member of the board of directors of Charity: Water and Pachama. He is also the CEO of Saltwater, his family office.

== Early life and education ==
Graves was born in San Diego, California and grew up near the beach. He attended Horizon Christian Academy, where he competed for the high school surf team. In 2006, he graduated with an economics degree from Miami University in Ohio, where he was a member of the water polo club team and the Beta Theta Pi fraternity.

== Career ==
Graves worked for General Electric. He eventually got an internship at Foursquare by pretending to work for them after they turned him down for a job.

In February 2010, Graves became the first employee of Uber, receiving the job by responding "here's a tip. email me :)" to a post by Travis Kalanick on Twitter. Graves started out as general manager and was named CEO shortly after the launch. In December 2010, Kalanick succeeded Graves as CEO and Graves became chief operating officer (COO).

By 2019, Graves owned 31.9 million shares in Uber. That year, he resigned from the board of directors of Uber.

In 2018, Graves founded Saltwater, his family office, focused on investments in technology businesses.

In February 2021, Graves made a $50 million investment in and became a member of the board of directors of Metromile, a pay-per-mile auto insurer. Lemonade completed its acquisition of Metromile in July 2022, after which Metromile became a wholly owned subsidiary under the name Metromile, LLC.

== Personal life ==
Graves is married to Molly Graves, his college sweetheart and a kindergarten teacher. They have four children, all sons, and live on the island of Kauaʻi, Hawaii. He is a supporter of the San Diego Padres baseball team.

Graves serves on the board of directors of Charity: Water and has pledged at least 1% of his net worth to the charity, which focuses on delivering clean water solutions to people in developing nations.
