= Taxis of Hong Kong =

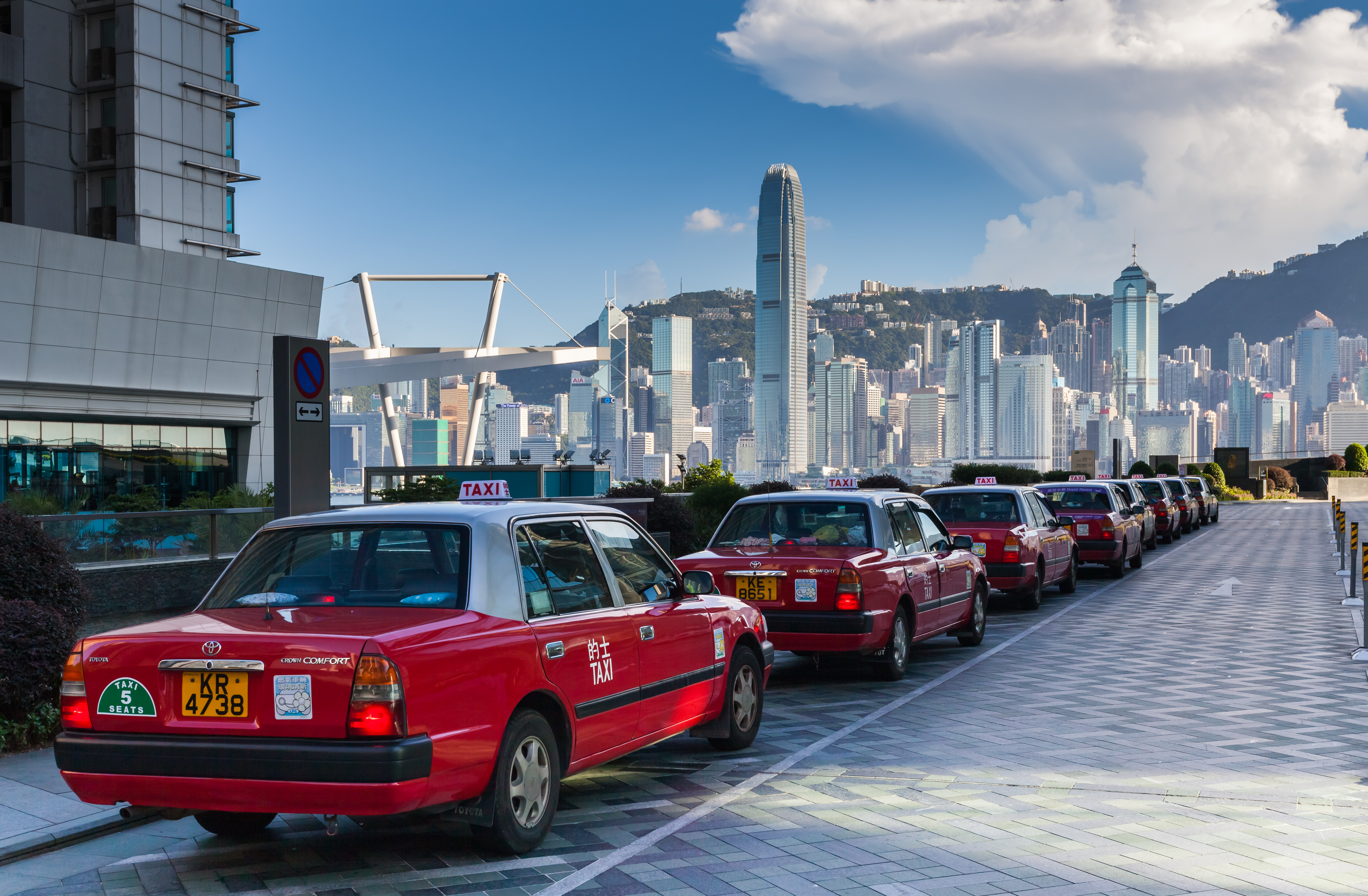
Red taxis outside the International Commerce Centre in Kowloon

The vast majority of taxis in Hong Kong are owned by 17 independent taxi companies, although some taxis are independently owned and operated. As of 2026, there are 18,163 taxis in Hong Kong, of which 15,250 were urban taxis, 2,838 were New Territories taxis, and 75 were Lantau taxis. Every day they serve about 1 million, 207,900 and 1,400 people respectively.

== History ==
=== 19th century ===
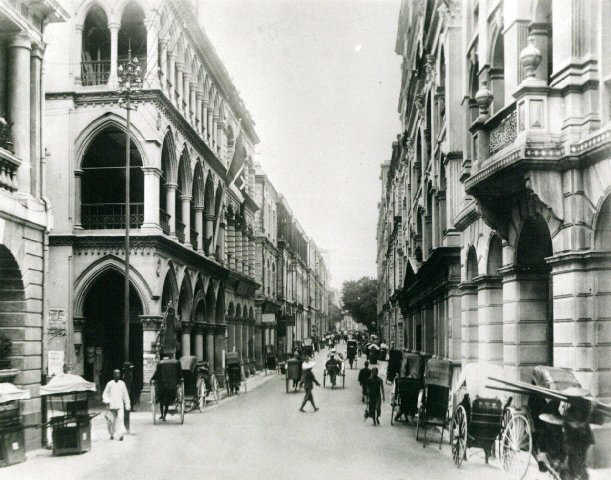
Sedan chairs and rickshaws awaiting fares on Queen's Road Central

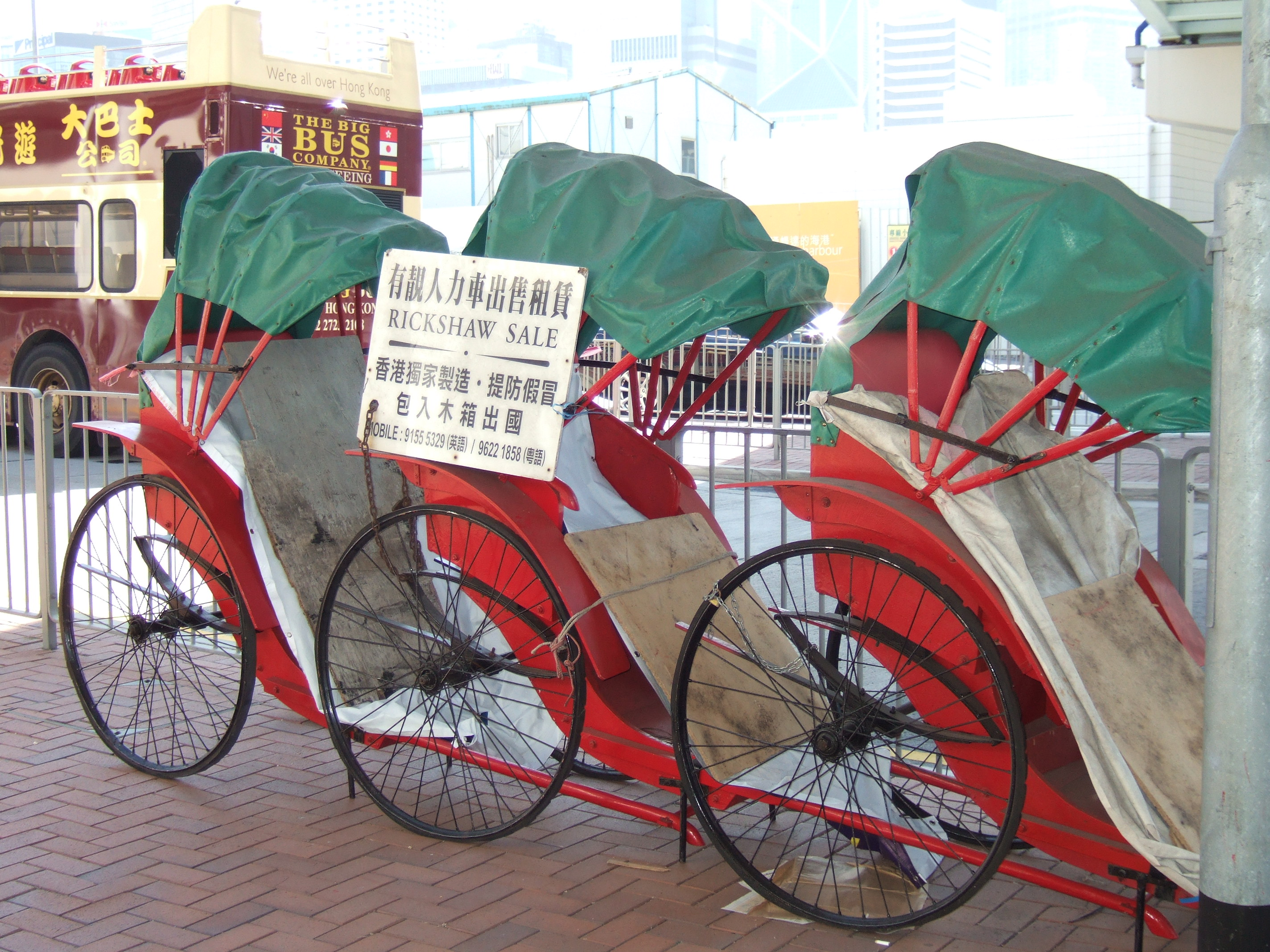
Rickshaws for sale at Central Ferry Piers in 2009

During the early colonial times, sedan chairs were the only form of public conveyance. Public chairs were licensed and charged according to tariffs which would be prominently displayed. Chair stands were found at all hotels, wharves, and major crossroads, and the sturdy chair bearers would clamour for regular patronage.

Much the same as motor cars nowadays, private chairs existed and were an important marker of a person's status. A civil officer's status was denoted by the number of bearers attached to his chair.

Their numbers peaked in about 1920, when 1,215 registered sedan chairs were on the road.

The rickshaw was first imported from Japan in 1870 by an American businessman. They were a popular form of transport for many years, peaking at more than 7,000 in the early part of the 20th century. Rickshaws competed with sedan chairs for customers depending on their budget, haste, or terrain to be negotiated. The rickshaw was more rapid, but was not suited to climbing the steep terrain of Hong Kong Island. Before Hong Kong's Peak Tram went into service in 1888, wealthy residents of The Peak were carried on sedan chairs by coolies up the steep paths to their residence, including former Governor Sir Richard MacDonnell's summer home, where they could take advantage of the cooler climate.

However, the popularity of rickshaws waned after World War II. No new licences for rickshaws have been issued since 1975, and licences became non-transferable. Thus, a dying breed of only a few old men still ply their trade at the Edinburgh Place Ferry Pier, mainly for tourists. The rickshaw drawers charged HK$300 to go around the block. There were about eight in 1998, and only four left in 2002, and two in 2011.

The last sedan chair was reportedly abandoned in 1965, and since the relocation of the Central Star Ferry pier at the end of 2006 the rickshaws have disappeared.

=== 20th century ===
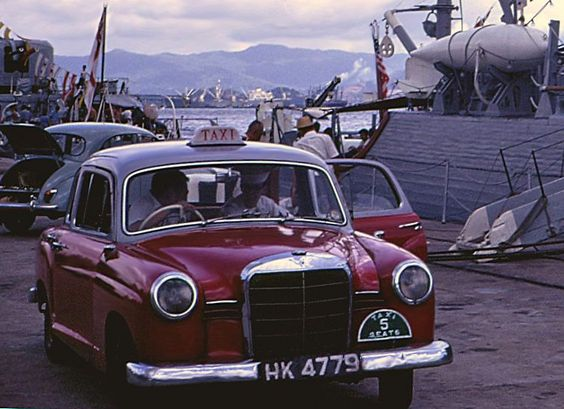
A Hong Kong Mercedes-Benz 190D Taxi in 1969

The Chinese name for taxi used in Hong Kong, dik si (的士), is a Cantonese transliteration of the English word "taxi". The earliest pioneer of the modern taxi service may have been Wu Zung (胡忠). In 1941, he is believed to have owned 40 taxis, including 10 white cards, which he leased to the government. When the Japanese occupation of Hong Kong began in December of the same year, he suspended his transport operation. He resumed his business after the war with 100 cars.

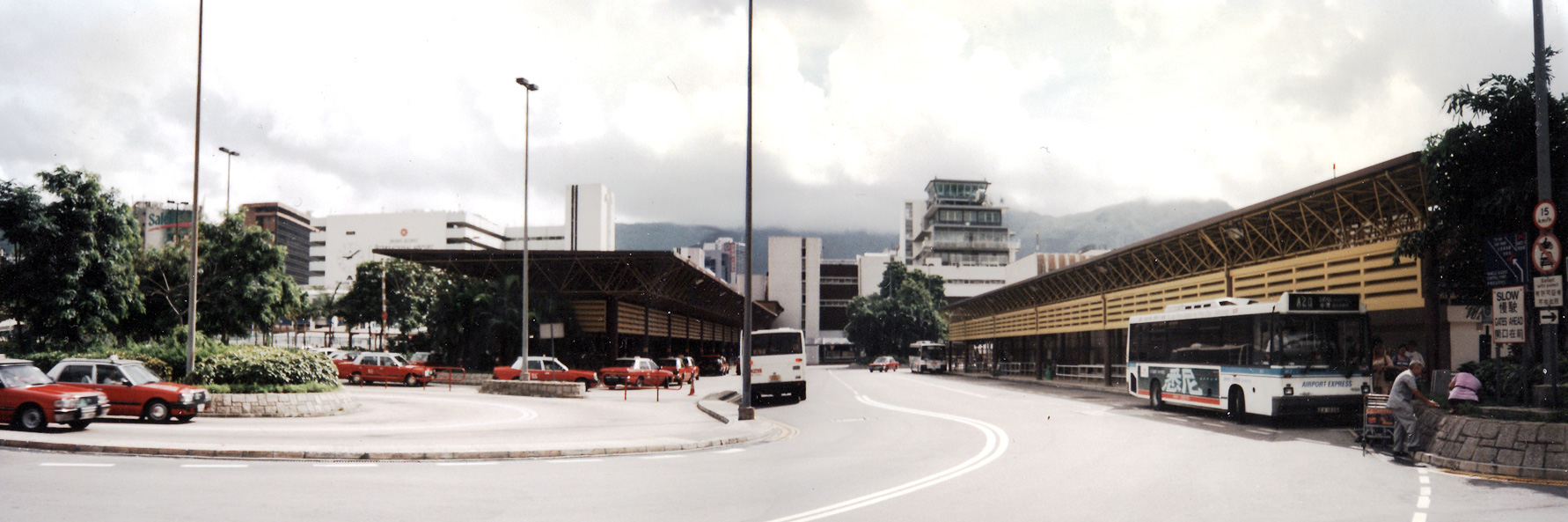
Red taxis at the Kai Tak Airport forecourt in 1998

The service was first officially recorded by the government in 1947 with 329 cars. By 1960 the service officially covered the New Territories, and the service increased to 1,026 cars. The number of taxis would multiply by 10,000 by 1980.

Prior to 1974, the livery of taxis in Hong Kong depended on colours chosen by the licensees, although the Transport Department had noted considerable confusion for passengers caused by the proliferation of colours and mingling with private vehicles, and by December 1969 had started considering a uniform appearance for licensed taxis.

On 13 September 1974, the government gazetted standard colours – silver for the upper half and red for the lower half – for all taxicabs in Hong Kong to weed out illegal taxis. As most of the vehicles would cluster in Kowloon due to it being the population centre, and demand in the New Territories was being met by illegal operators, a licensed taxi service catering only for the New Territories was announced on 5 June 1976. From then onwards, "ordinary" (red) taxis would be allowed to continue to operate in the New Territories as well as Kowloon and Hong Kong Island, while the New Territories taxis – silver for the upper half and green for the lower half – would be forbidden from venturing into urban areas. A batch of 20 blue taxis that serve Lantau Island started operating in 1983.

== Licence ==
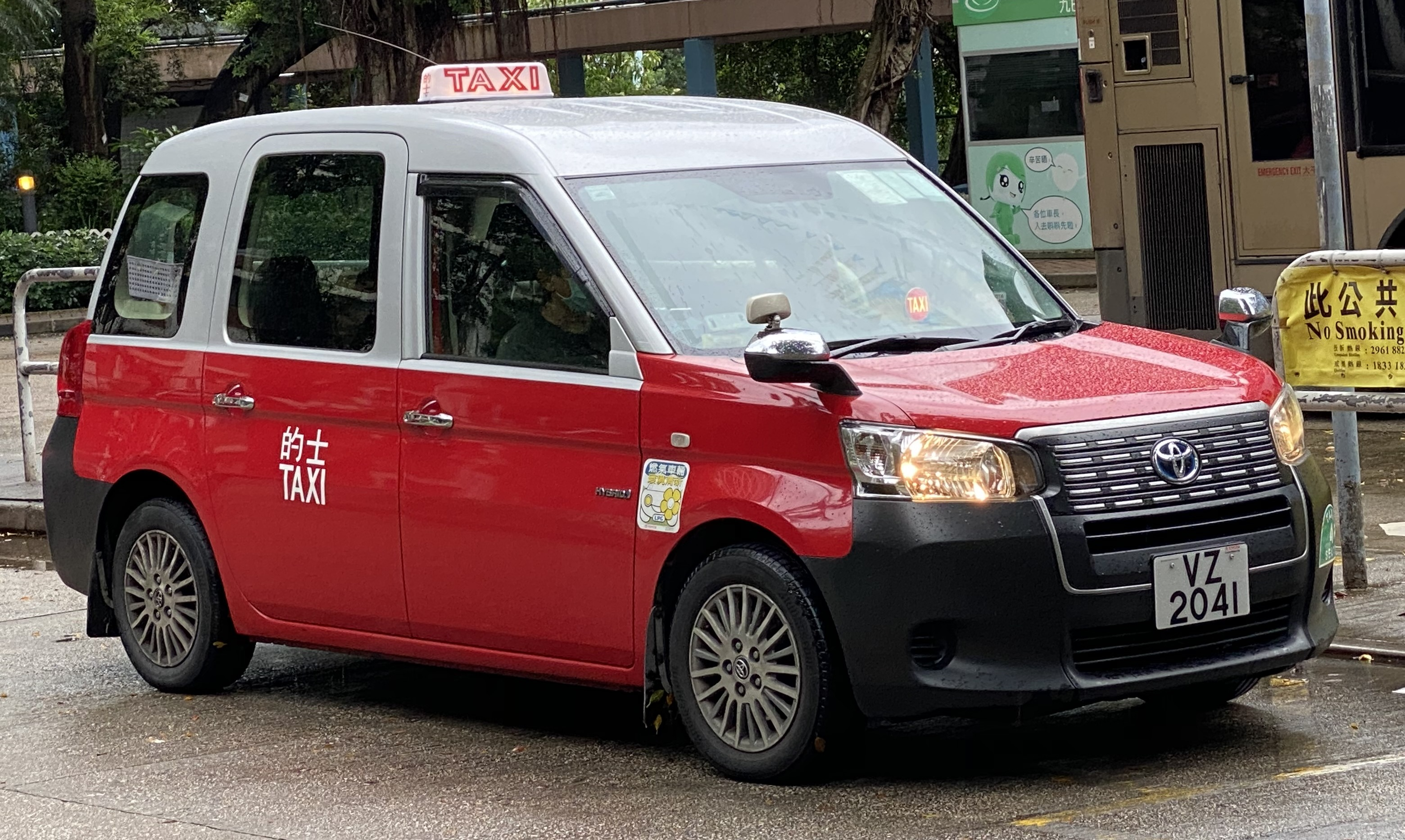
Urban taxi

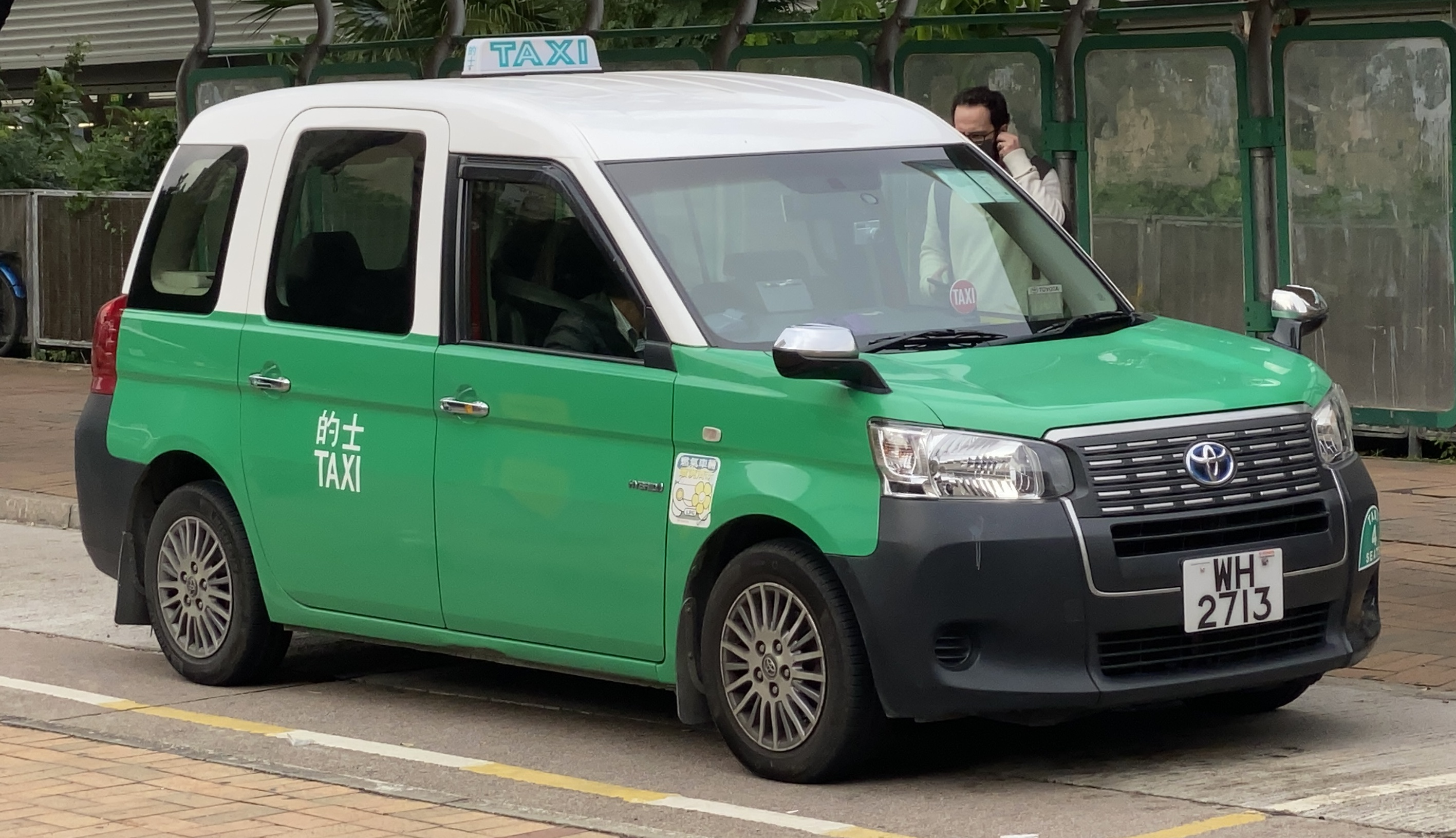
New Territories taxi

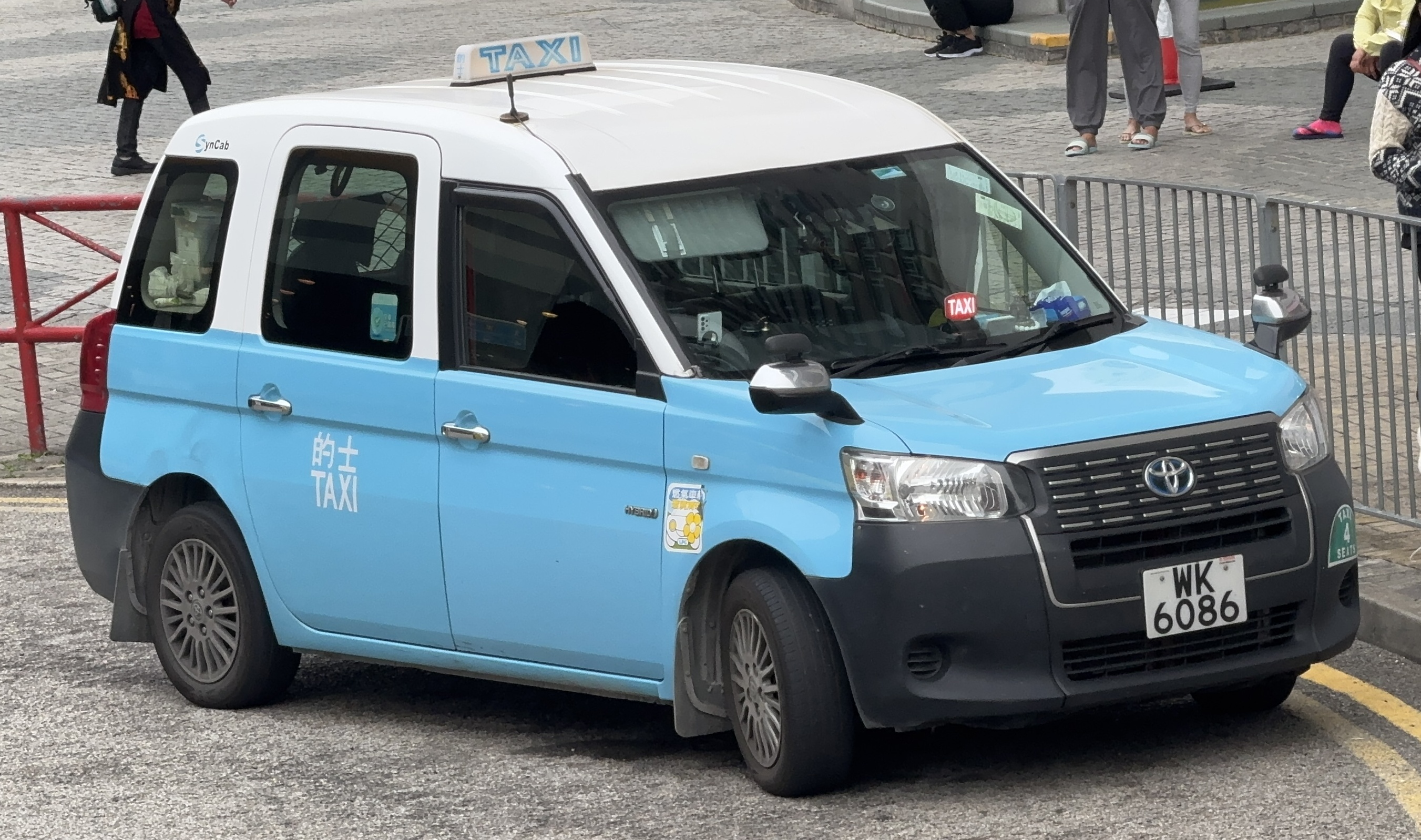
Lantau taxi

The taxi trade is regulated by the Government, as are the fare scales. Taxis need a licence to operate in Hong Kong.

The service area of the three types of taxis are defined by the Government in the 1960s. The need for the three different types was to avoid clustering of taxis in the more populated/profitable areas of the territory and a shortage in others. All three types of taxis serve Hong Kong International Airport, Hong Kong Port of Hong Kong–Zhuhai–Macau Bridge and The Disneyland Resort.

Since 1964, the Transport Department has introduced a system of public tender of taxi licences. Taxi licences are transferable after one year from the date of issue, and licence holders are given a perpetual operating right. Furthermore, taxi licences can be renewed every year on the payment of an annual licence fee, and there are no licence renewal prerequisites such as taxi driver qualification or taxi service quality examination.

The government stopped issuing licences in 1994, when there were a total of 18,138 in the territory. Existing licences are transferable and are traded on the open market, and prices have been rising due to speculation, with fare rises tending to feed into the price of licences. The going cost for a licence in 2011 was around HK$5 million – an increase of 36% from the year before. In 2015, the market price peaked at HK$7.25 million. As of 2024, the market price has gone down to HK$4 million.

The trading of taxi licences is easy, and legislative regulatory control hardly exists. The perpetual nature and easy transferability of taxi licences, the recent frozen supply of taxi licences, and the free trading market system in Hong Kong make taxi licences not only an operating requirement in the taxi industry but also an investment asset. Through various taxi licence exchange markets, licences can be cashed in at retirement, at changing jobs, or simply to make a profit. These factors shape Hong Kong's current taxi licence system with characteristics different from other cities or countries.

=== Urban taxi ===
The red taxis have the highest fares among all, and serve all areas of Hong Kong Island, Kowloon and New Territories. They may also run the north of Lantau Island, Chek Lap Kok and Hong Kong Port of Hong Kong–Zhuhai–Macau Bridge, but they are not permitted to run on most of Discovery Bay and the part south to Shek Mun Kap.

A taxi will sometimes appear with its roof light on, but with the 'For Hire' flag covered by an 'Out of Service' sign; this means they are currently travelling to pick up passengers that have booked a ride through electronic or telephone booking, or are attempting to catch a fare back across the harbour tunnel.

There is no legal requirement for drivers to know all the destinations in their allowed area. Commonly, drivers refuse to take passengers wanting to cross the harbour on this basis, although in theory drivers do not have the right to refuse a hire based on destination. On both sides of the harbour, the Government has erected taxi ranks catering for those returning taxis prepared to cross the harbour for a single-toll trip.

=== New Territories taxi ===
The green taxis, the second most expensive, are officially named New Territories Taxis. However, it means neither that these green taxis may serve all parts of the New Territories, nor may run only in the New Territories.

The operation area of the New Territories taxis includes:

- Tuen Mun District
- Yuen Long District
- Tai Po District
- Northern District
- Sha Tin District (only for Ma On Shan, Ma Liu Shui, Hong Kong Science Park and Kau To Shan (Kau To Shan Road excluded))
- Most parts of Sai Kung District (except for Tseung Kwan O New Town, Fei Ngo Shan and Tai Sheung Tok)
- Tsuen Wan District (only for Chuen Lung North, Ting Kau West, Sham Tseng and Tsing Lung Tau)
- Lok Ma Chau Control Point (from 11:00 pm to 06:30 am on the following day)
- Lok Ma Chau Spur Line Public Transport Interchange
- Shenzhen Bay Port Hong Kong Port Area

New Territories Taxis are also permitted to carry passengers along specified routes to or from the following locations:

- Passenger Terminals and the Ground Transportation Centre of the Hong Kong International Airport in Chek Lap Kok
- Shun Lee Estate (which is in fact in Kwun Tong District of Kowloon)
- Hang Hau Station, Tsing Yi Station (of Airport Railway) and Tsuen Wan Station, which are mainly designated interchange with red taxis and MTR
- Tseung Kwan O Hospital (only the A&E)
- Sha Tin Racecourse (near Penfold Park)
- Prince of Wales Hospital
- The Public Transport Interchange at the Hong Kong Port of the Hong Kong-Zhuhai-Macao Bridge
- Hong Kong Disneyland

New Territories taxis carrying passengers via Sha Tin District and from Tsuen Wan Station, Tsing Yi Station, Hong Kong Disneyland and Passenger Terminals are required to use the Shing Mun Tunnels.

Source: Transport Department

=== Lantau taxi ===
The blue taxis run only in most parts of Lantau Island and Chek Lap Kok, except most of Discovery Bay. They are exclusive in the case that they can serve south Lantau Island, restricted for most vehicles without a permit. They are not quite as ubiquitous: there are only around 75 of them. There have been reports of some unofficial, unlicensed taxis in blue livery operating around these regions.

The operation area of Lantau Taxis include:

== Competitions ==
Taxi groups versus ride-hailing services

Currently, drivers with three years of experience have to go through a process of testing and certification before they could qualify as taxi drivers. The council's proposal that drivers for e-hailing services need only three years of experience, without similar test requirements, was, in their opinion, much too lax.

But the council also recommends that all e-hailing drivers undergo background security checks, have the necessary language skills and are sufficiently healthy before they are considered suitable candidates. This will act as an additional safeguard for passenger safety.

In terms of fare charges, the industry questions why, while taxi fares are bound by the meter, e-hailing services are not subject to any fare control and are free to set their own fare according to the road conditions and rush-hour periods. As taxis – whether traditional operators or the e-hailing kind – are part of the public transport system, it is only natural that their fares should be regulated. Indeed, e-hailing taxi services in different territories are subject to fare controls of one kind or another.

In July 2024, the government has announced that it will greatly consider regulating online ride-hailing services by the end of 2025

== Cars used ==
Historically, Standard, DeSoto Deluxe, Morris Oxford, Ford Popular, Hillman Minx, Austin 8, Austin Cambridge, Mercedes W120 Ponton, Ford Anglia, Vauxhall Cresta and Vauxhall Velox were used up to the 1960s. Since the 1970s, Japanese cars replaced the various European models used earlier. Among them, the Toyota Crown Comfort YXS10 and Nissan Cedric Y31 had always been the most popular.

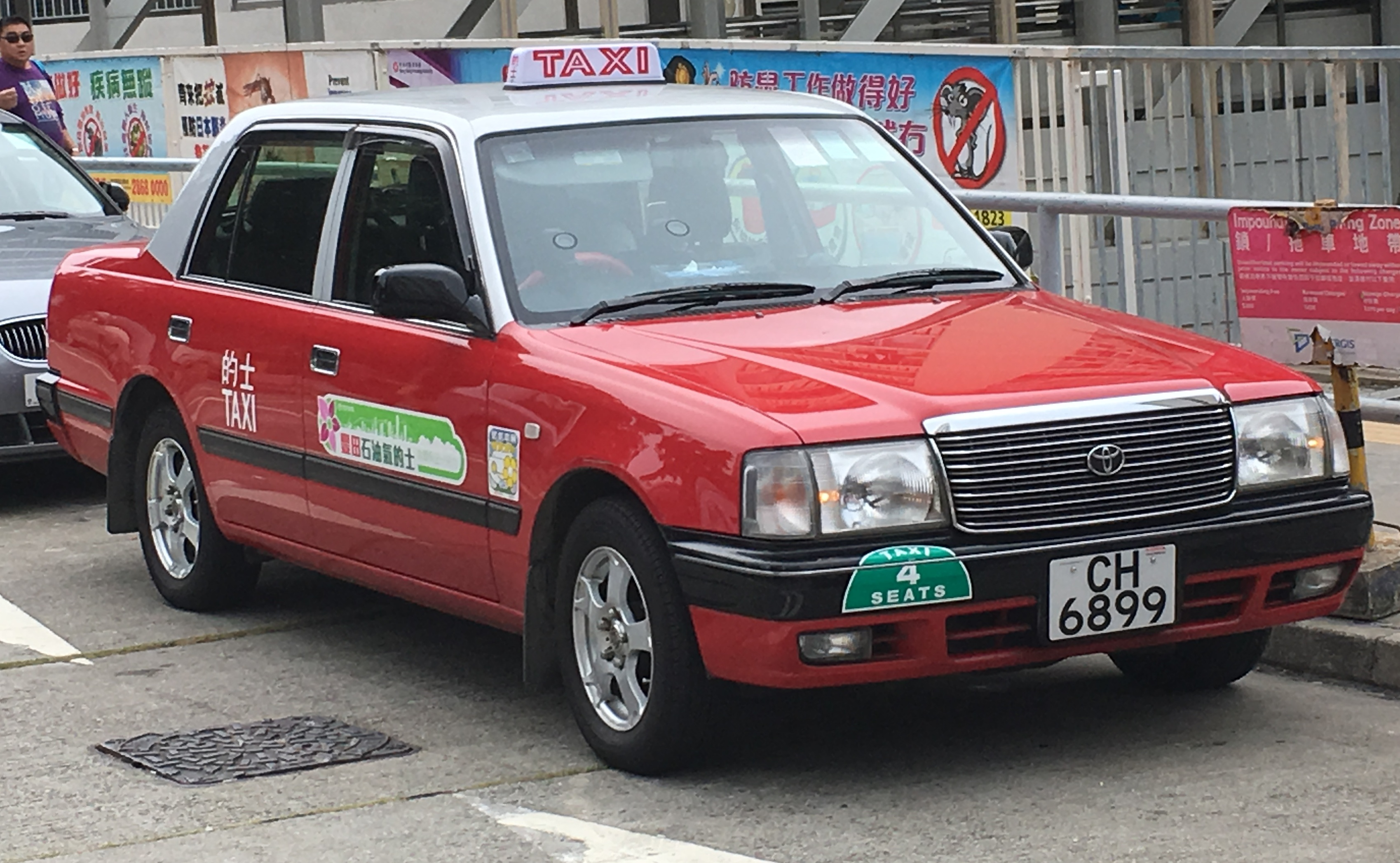
Toyota Crown Comfort (4 pax)

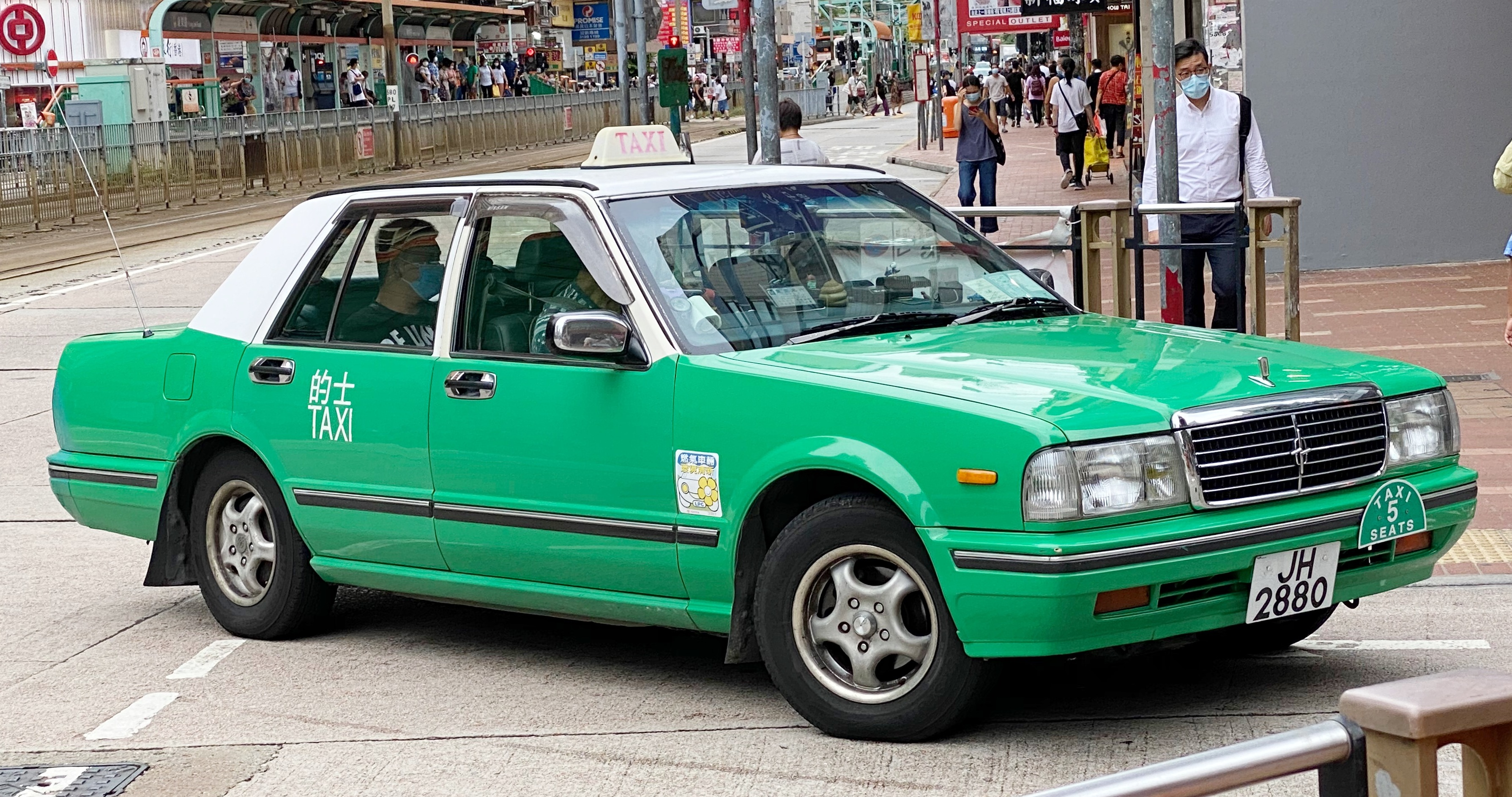
Nissan Cedric (5 pax)

All taxis bear a semi-circular green plate on the front grille, and at the back of the vehicle indicating the number of seats available. Throughout history, most Hong Kong taxis have been 4-door saloons with bench seats in the front, thus allowing it to carry up to six occupants. In the early 1980s, 4-passenger taxis were introduced. Smaller saloons such as the Nissan Bluebird 910, Nissan Sunny B12, Toyota Corona (CT141) and the Mitsubishi Lancer were used. However, these were all phased out by the mid-1990s. Since then and until 2008, all Hong Kong taxis have been 5-passengers vehicles. But from 2008, the new Toyota Comfort equipped with new 2.0 VVT-i engine and equipped with floor shift automatic instead of column shift automatic, making the new Comfort a 4-passengers taxi again.

Australian Ford Falcon estate cars tried to enter the market in year 2000 but they were never popular.

Today, almost all taxis in Hong Kong are XS10 Toyota Comforts (over 99%), the minority being Nissan Cedric (Y31) saloons which were discontinued from the end of 2005.

On 29 May 2007, there were reports that plans are afoot to introduce the LTI-licensed, Chinese Geely-manufactured, LPG-powered TX4 London Black Cabs into the Hong Kong taxi service market. A feasibility study is under way between the Hong Kong Productivity Council and Geely.

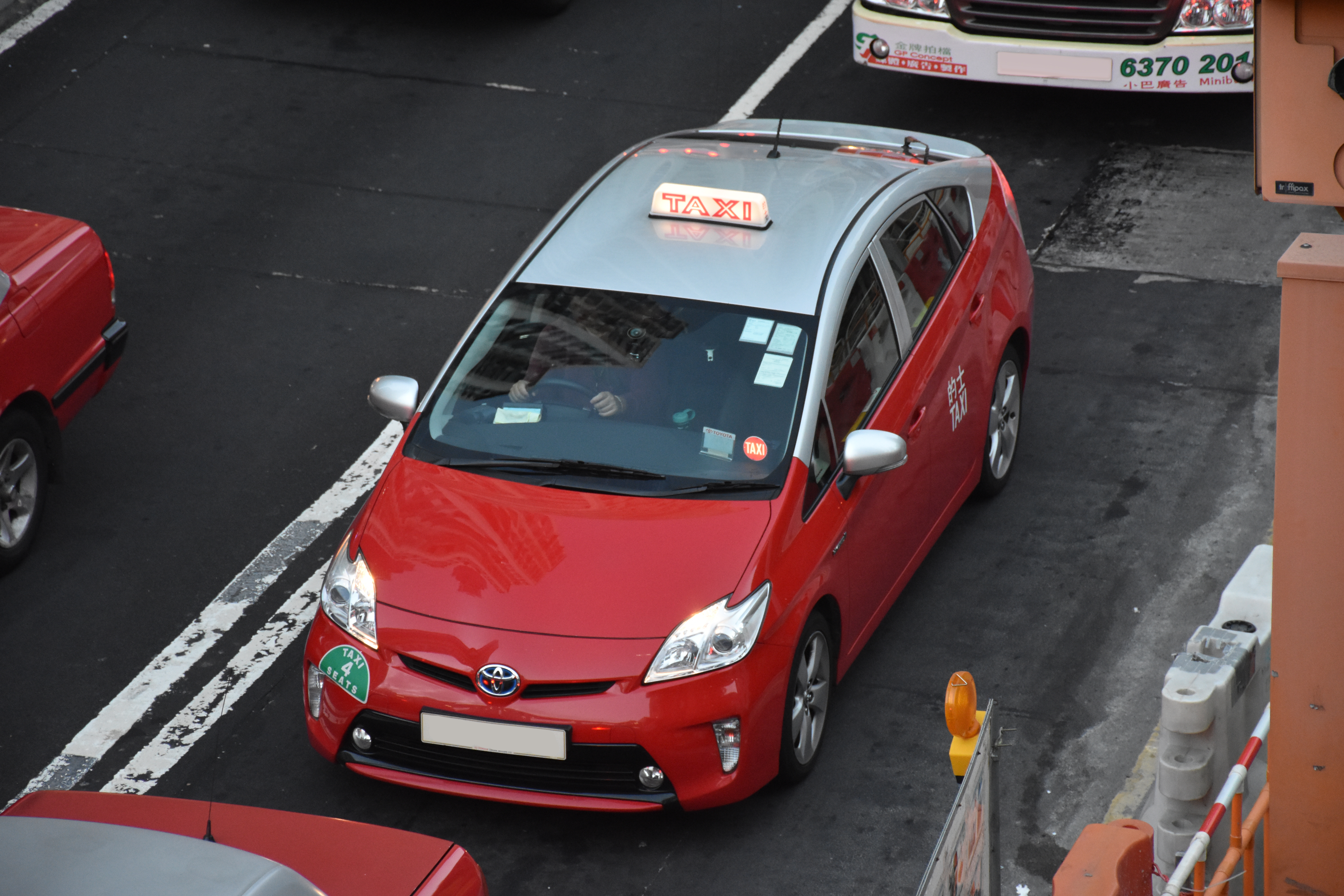
Toyota Prius

In February 2013, Crown Motors introduced the Toyota Prius (XW30) Hybrid Taxi to the HK Taxi lineup, but it is still an uncommon sight on the road.

In May 2013, Nissan had re-updated a newer Nissan Cedric Y31 to the HK Taxi line up with newly re-updated bumpers, a newer taxi top and a Cedric badge, but it is still considered uncommon on the street.

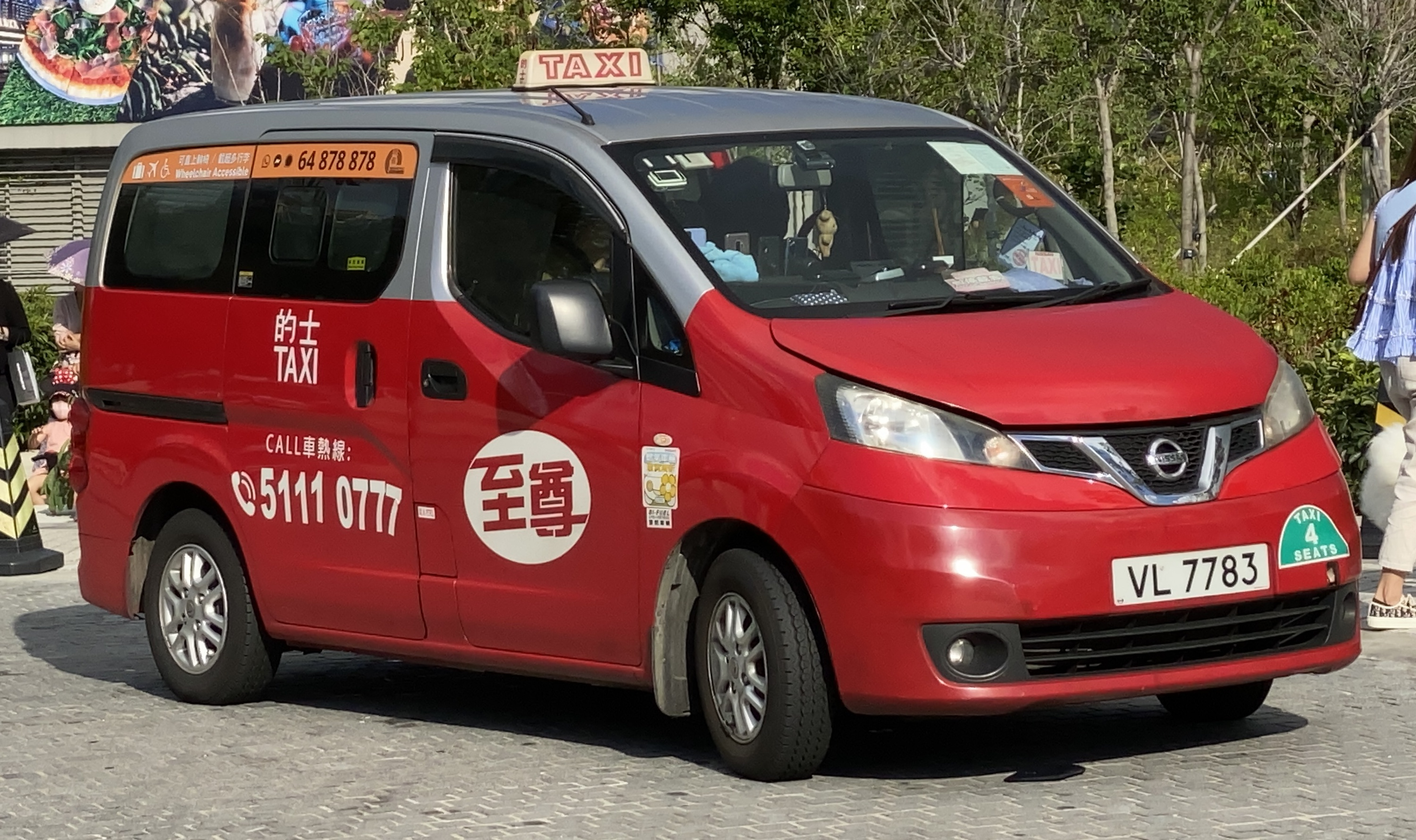
Nissan NV 200

On 11 December 2014, Honest Motors unveiled the Nissan NV200 Taxi in Hong Kong. The taxi is powered by both gasoline and LPG.

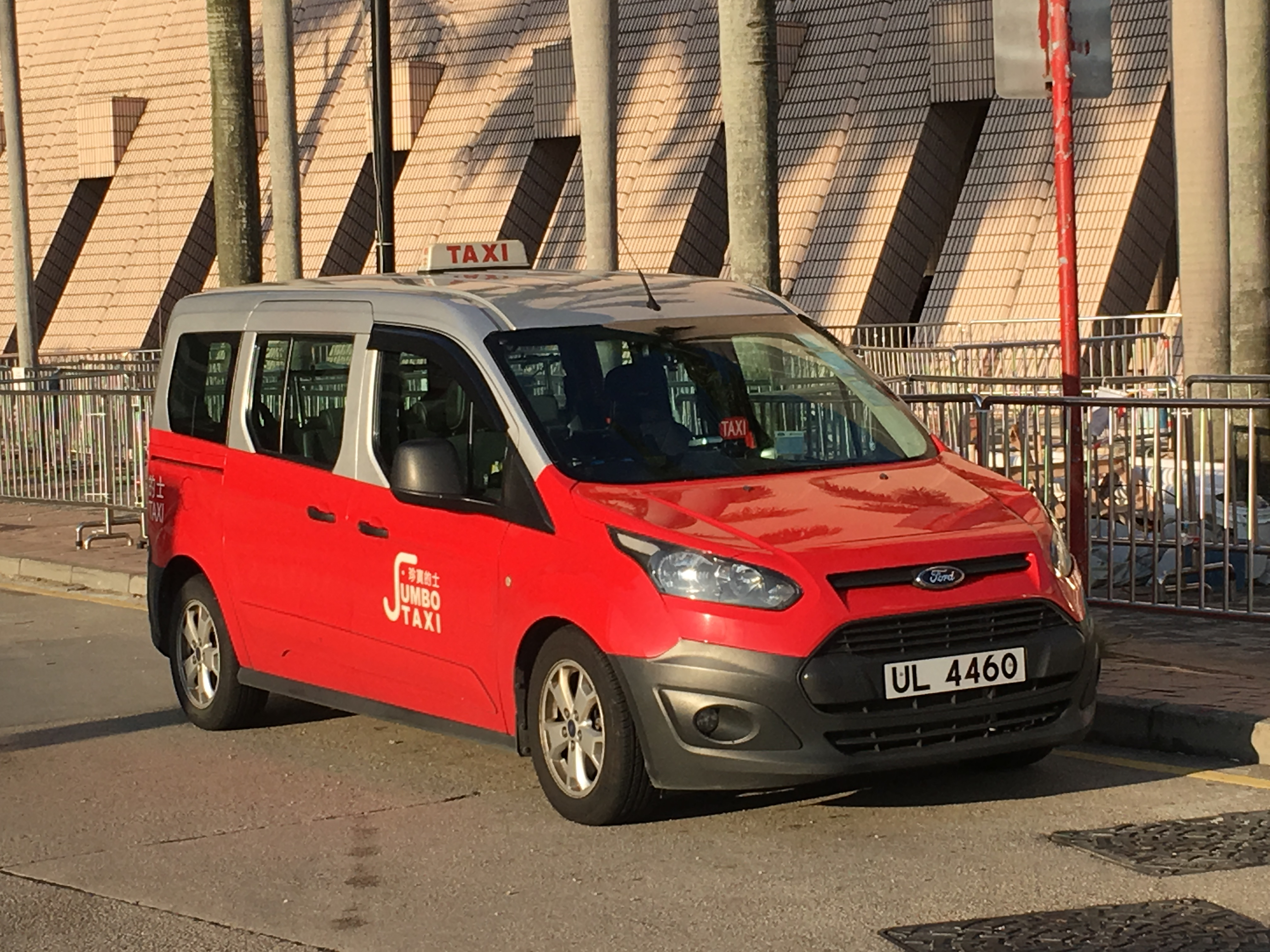
Ford Transit Connect LPG

On 5 February 2015, Ford introduced the Ford Transit Connect Taxi, powered by a LPG 2.5L i-VCT engine.

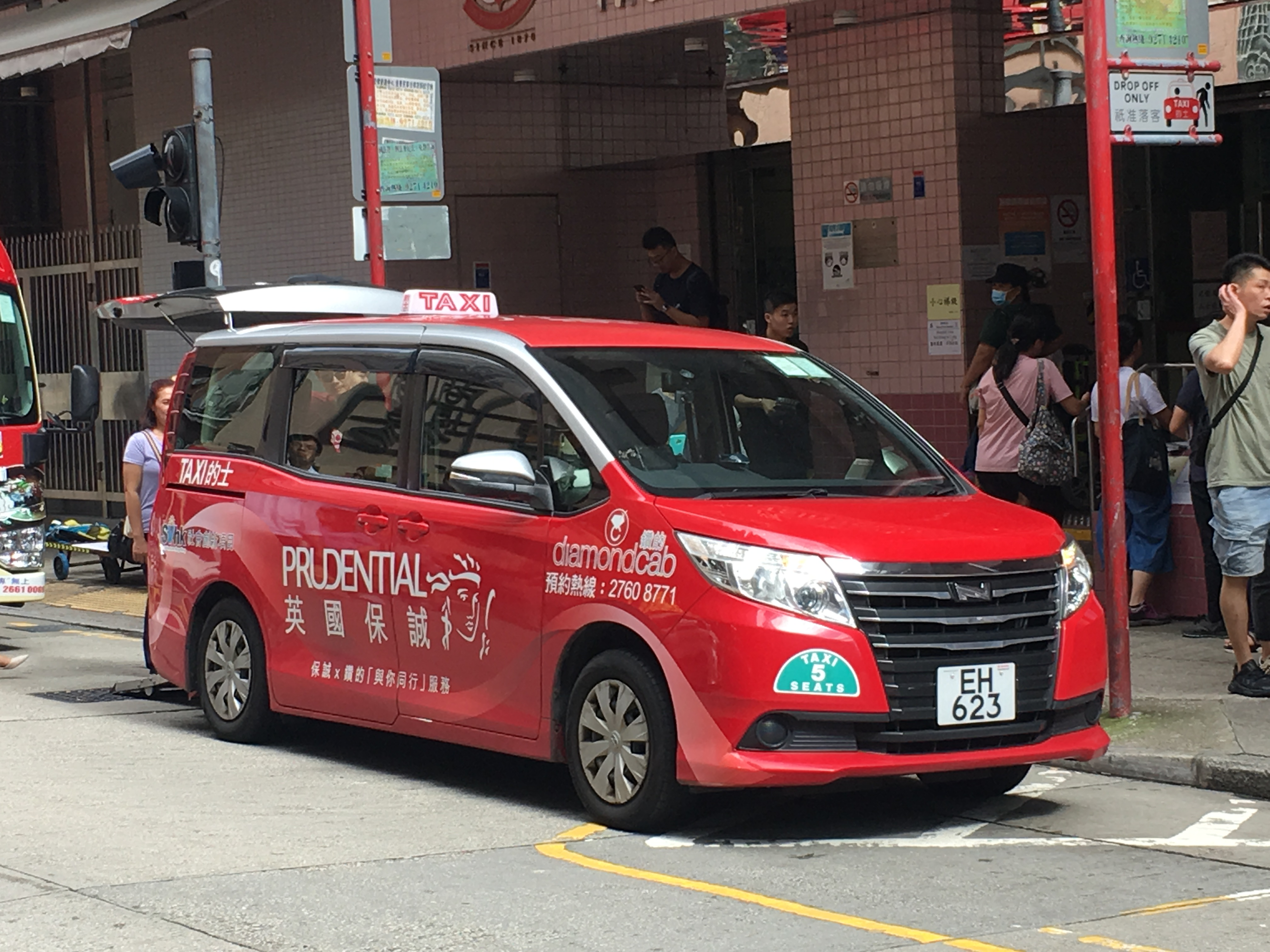
Toyota Noah

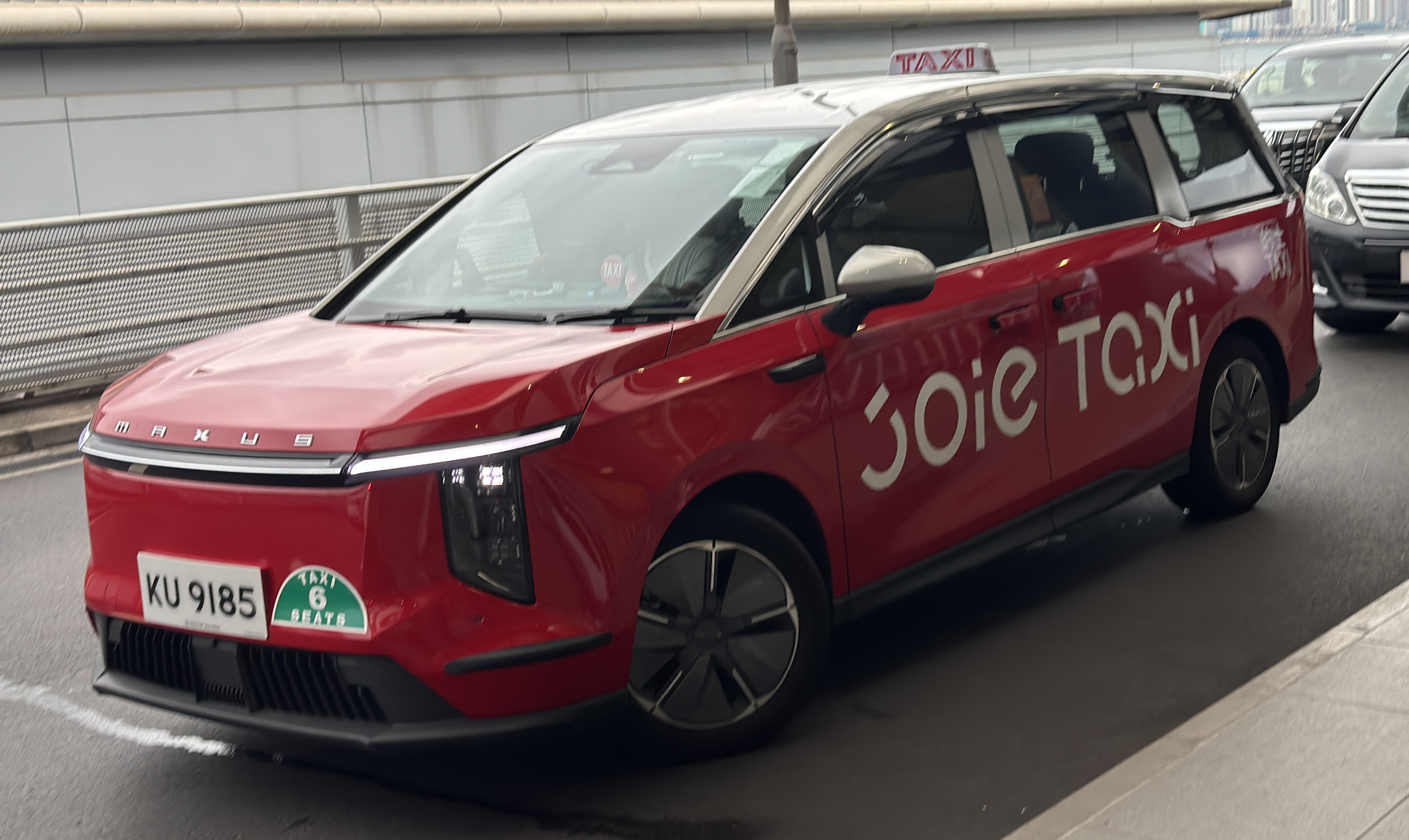
Maxus Mifa JOIE taxi

In 2017, Toyota discontinued production of Comfort and LPG Comfort, and started producing the new JPN Taxi for the Tokyo Olympics 2020. The JPN Taxi was introduced in Hong Kong as the Comfort Hybrid with a 1NZ-FPX I4 LPG engine in a hybrid system. The first batch of Comfort Hybrids was shipped to Hong Kong in July 2018.

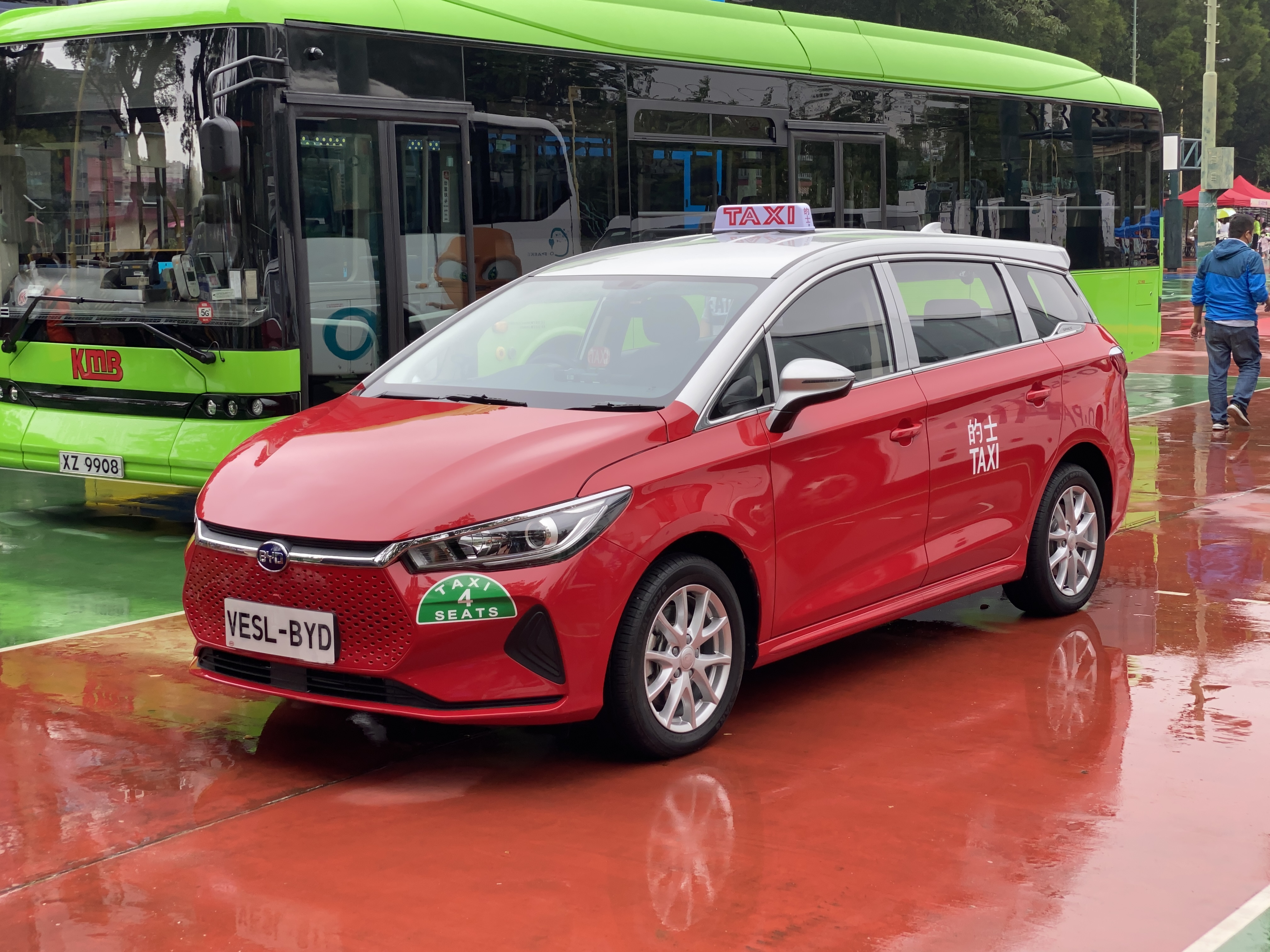
BYD e6

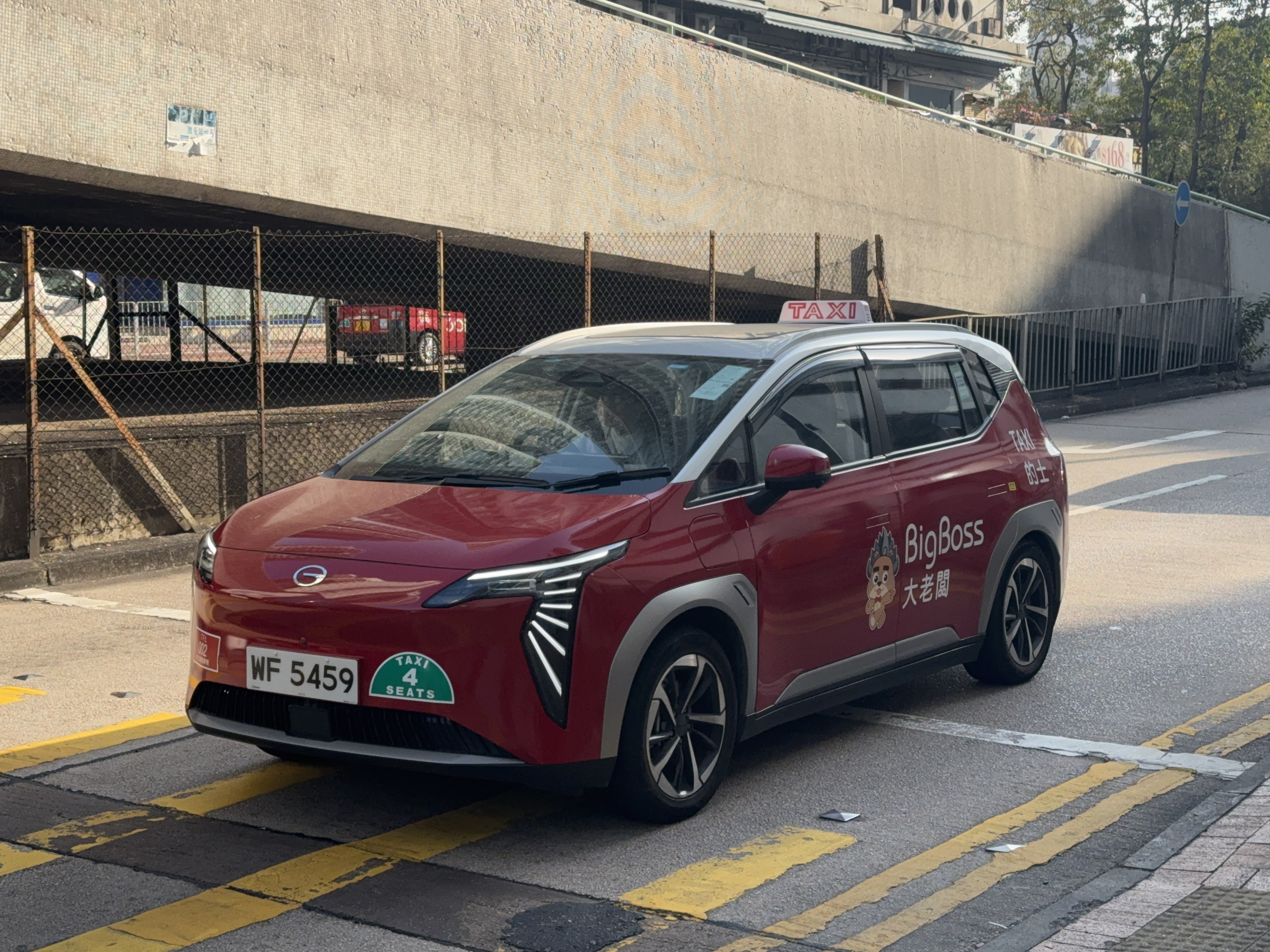
GAC Aion Y

In December 2023, a deal between the Hong Kong Tele-call Taxi Association and Chinese car manufacturer BYD was signed to introduce 200 new BYD-manufactured EV taxis and Maxus Mifa to Hong Kong in March 2024, as part of the government's plan to introduce 3,000 new EV taxi vehicles to Hong Kong by the end of 2027.

All taxis are imported new; there is a type approval process for approving the models of cars to be used as taxis (meaning unapproved models cannot be used as taxis). However, used parts from Japan are frequently used, so it is not uncommon to see stickers in Japanese on the taxis' doors.

Taxis imported to Hong Kong are usually red-colour based vehicles, New territories and Lantau taxi owners would therefore have to convert their vehicles into their own respective colours of green and blue, which they usually choose to only paint the exterior of their taxi. The original red coating can therefore still be seen from the door gaps or the engine compartment.

== Fuels ==
Until the late 1990s, all Hong Kong taxis ran on diesel fuel, aside from 4-passenger taxis which ran on petrol. In 1996, a few taxis that ran on LPG appeared as part of the government's test project for alternative fuel. This project proved successful, leading to all new taxis being factory-built LPG since 1999. To speed up the replacement of diesel taxis with LPG ones, from mid 2000 to the end of 2003, the government offered a cash grant to each taxi owner who purchased a new LPG taxi during that period.

Since 1 August 2001, no more diesel taxis were allowed to be imported into Hong Kong, and from 1 January 2006, driving a diesel taxi on the streets of Hong Kong became illegal. Therefore, all taxis in Hong Kong are currently running on LPG.

Although LPG-powered vehicles are supposed to be relatively non-polluting, and do indeed reduce roadside pollution, a 2007 study by Polytechnic University indicated that older LPG taxis emitted at least double the amount of carbon monoxide and hydrocarbons compared to diesel. But the government still claimed that properly maintained LPG engines reduce pollution by 50% to 200%.

== Fares ==
A fare table must be displayed clearly inside the taxi, by law. The same legally-enforceable fare table is also listed on the government's website. Fares are charged according to distance travelled and waiting time, measured by a meter on board. There is a starting fare, and there are surcharges for luggage and tolled tunnels and bridges, as well as surcharges for telephone-arranged ordering. Along some restricted kerbs, there are designated pick-up and drop-off points exclusively for taxis. Some taxi operators will offer discounts to attract repeat business. Fares are determined by the government and revised from time to time upon the recommendation of the Transport Advisory Committee.

From 14 July 2024 onwards, the flag fall – including the fare for the first two kilometres – is HK$29 for red taxis, HK$25.50 for green taxis and HK$24 for the blue Lantau cabs; thereafter, the meter adds HK$2.10 for every 200 metres travelled for Urban Taxis and HK$1.90 for New Territories Taxis and Lantau Taxis. For Urban Taxis and New Territories Taxis, the rate of the incremental change will be decreased to HK$1.40 after 9 km for Urban taxies and to 8 km for New territories taxis of the hire. As for the Lantau Island Taxis, the rate of the incremental change will be decreased to HK$1.60 after 20 km of the hire.

There is an additional charge of HK$6 for every piece of baggage and every animal or bird carried on board are charged with HK$5.

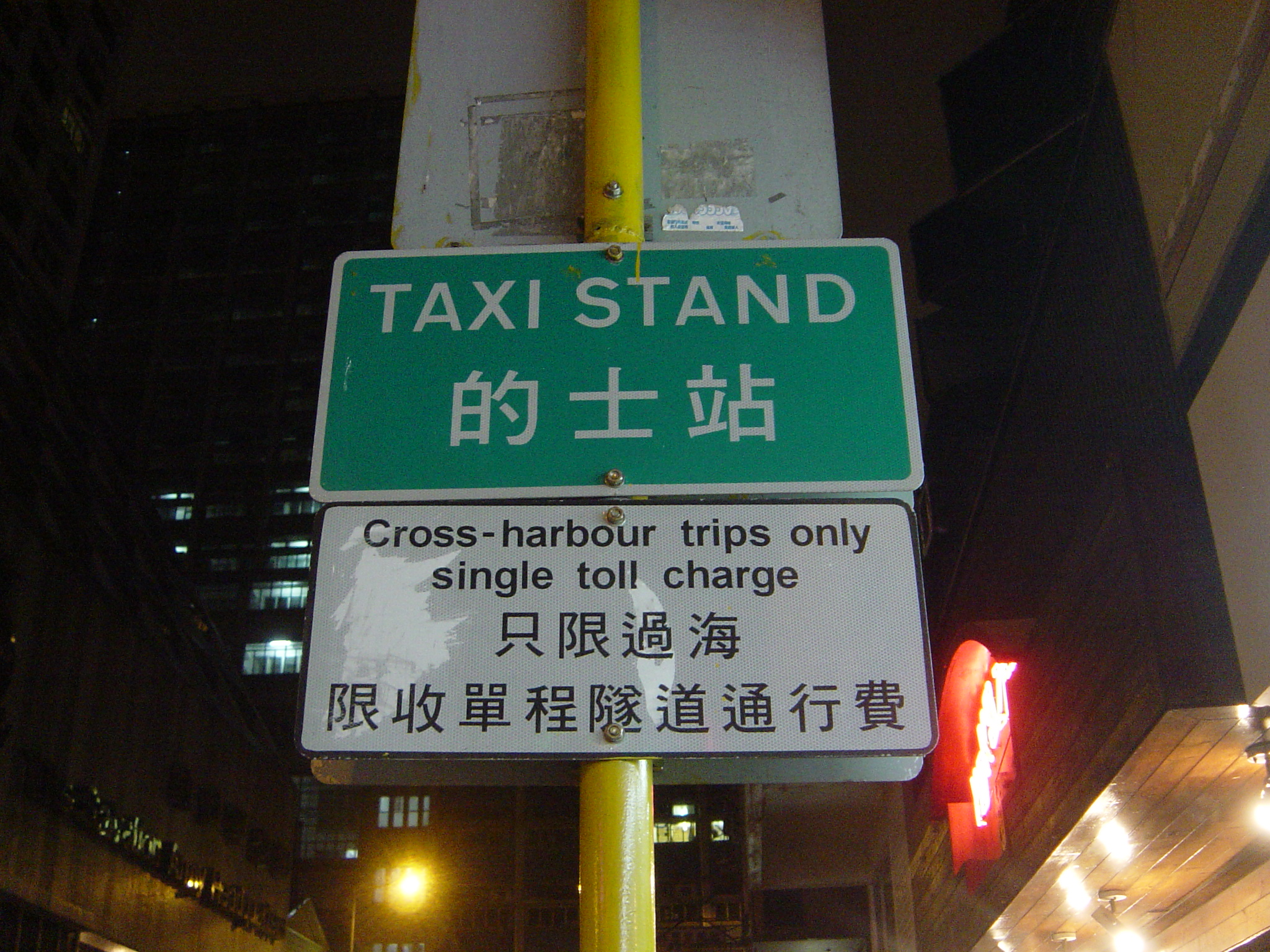
A cross-harbour taxi stand

Taxi passengers wishing to cross the Victoria harbour are required to pay the tunnel toll fee (and a return fee) of HK$25 (+$25). Taxi passengers going through any other non-harbour-crossing tunnels with a toll is required to pay the toll fee only.

In July 2007, it was reported that many taxi drivers were engaged in rampant illegal price-cutting in their competition with call-cab drivers for passengers. Rates offered were up to 20% lower than the metered fares on long-distance trips, with competition being particularly fierce on the airport route. The warring factions took turns to blockade Hong Kong International Airport to air their grievances. Andrew Cheng Kar-foo, chairman of the Legislative Council's transport panel, proposed cutting taxi fares to deal with illicit discounting. Representatives of call-cab drivers and taxi owners were opposed to the idea. Urban taxi groups have been lobbying for permission to impose a HK$1 per trip fuel surcharge when the price of liquefied petroleum gas per litre is between HK$3.10 and HK$4. Legislative Councillors unanimously passed a motion urging the government to allow taxis to impose the surcharge. However, the vote was non-binding on the Government. The Transportation Secretary rejected the appeal.

== Different taxi light modes ==
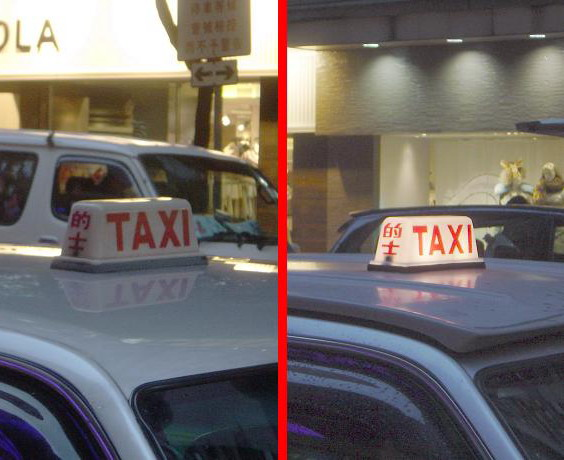
The light on the roof of a taxi indicates the taxi is available for hire if it is on.

Each taxi has a light on top of the vehicle which is illuminated when the taxi is available for hire. A "flag" visible on top of the dash board marked "for hire" also indicates a taxi is available. A taxi may have an 'Out of Service' sign on whenever the taxi is not available for hire, e.g., shift-changing. Passengers are not permitted to hire a taxi displaying an 'Out of Service' sign. Taxi drivers may continue to have a lit roof sign and 'For Hire' flag up if they are looking for customers wishing to head to areas in their service (e.g., an urban taxi in the New Territories, looking for fares heading to the urban area).

== Representation ==
Taxi drivers' interests and those of owners are not necessarily aligned. Hong Kong Taxi Owners Association represents owners of taxi licences, and drivers, who are most frequently are not owners but who rent their vehicles on a daily basis, are represented by the Motor Transport Workers General Union. In 2013, day-time drivers would pay upwards of HK$380 for each shift, and night shift drivers would pay HK$350. Owners would dispute with drivers' groups as they seek to increase the daily rental charge each time taxi fares increased.

== See also ==
- Transport in Hong Kong
