= Cheung Lek Mei =

Village in Hong Kong

Coordinates: 22.413505°N 114.190441°E

Cheung Lek Mei (Chinese: 長瀝尾), sometimes transliterated as Cheung Lik Mei, is a village in Fo Tan, Sha Tin District, Hong Kong.

== Administration ==
Cheung Lek Mei is a recognized village under the New Territories Small House Policy. It is one of the villages represented within the Sha Tin Rural Committee. For electoral purposes, Cheung Lek Mei is part of the Fo Tan constituency, which was formerly represented by Lui Kai-wing until July 2021.

== History ==
The village historically shared a single higher earth god shrine with Kau To, Ma Niu and Ma Liu Shui. All were part of the Fo Tan Yeuk (火炭約).

The population of the village comprised about 9 to 12 households and a total of 47 people in 1911.

== See also ==
- Kau To Hang
- Kau Yeuk (Sha Tin)
- Tai Po Kau Nature Reserve
