= Raitero =

Drivers who bring workers to their jobs

Raiteros are drivers who transport groups of low-wage workers to their jobs for a fee. The word is a spanglish neologism derived from ride. It means "someone who makes a living by giving people a ride". Raiteros are most commonly used by immigrant farmworkers and workers at distant factories or warehouses. The services often are illegal and charge exploitative fees of the workers. In Chicago and in parts of Central New Jersey, raiteros play an expanded role in selecting employees and paying them on behalf of the employer or temp agency.

== See also ==
- Jitney
- Illegal taxi operation
