= Ma Niu Village =

Village in Hong Kong

Coordinates: 22.408016°N 114.20014°E

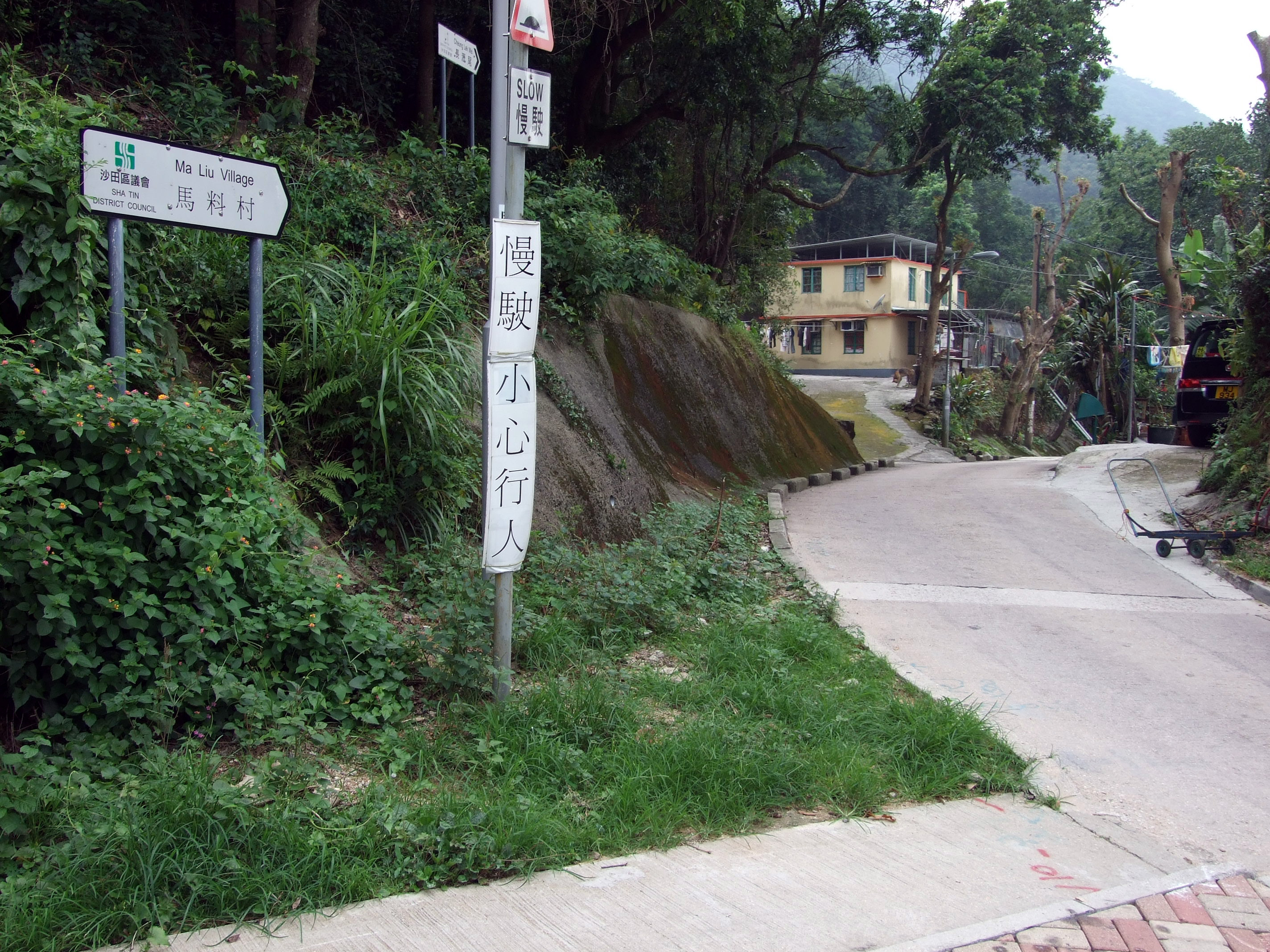
Ma Lok Path (馬樂徑) leading to Ma Niu Village in June 2010.

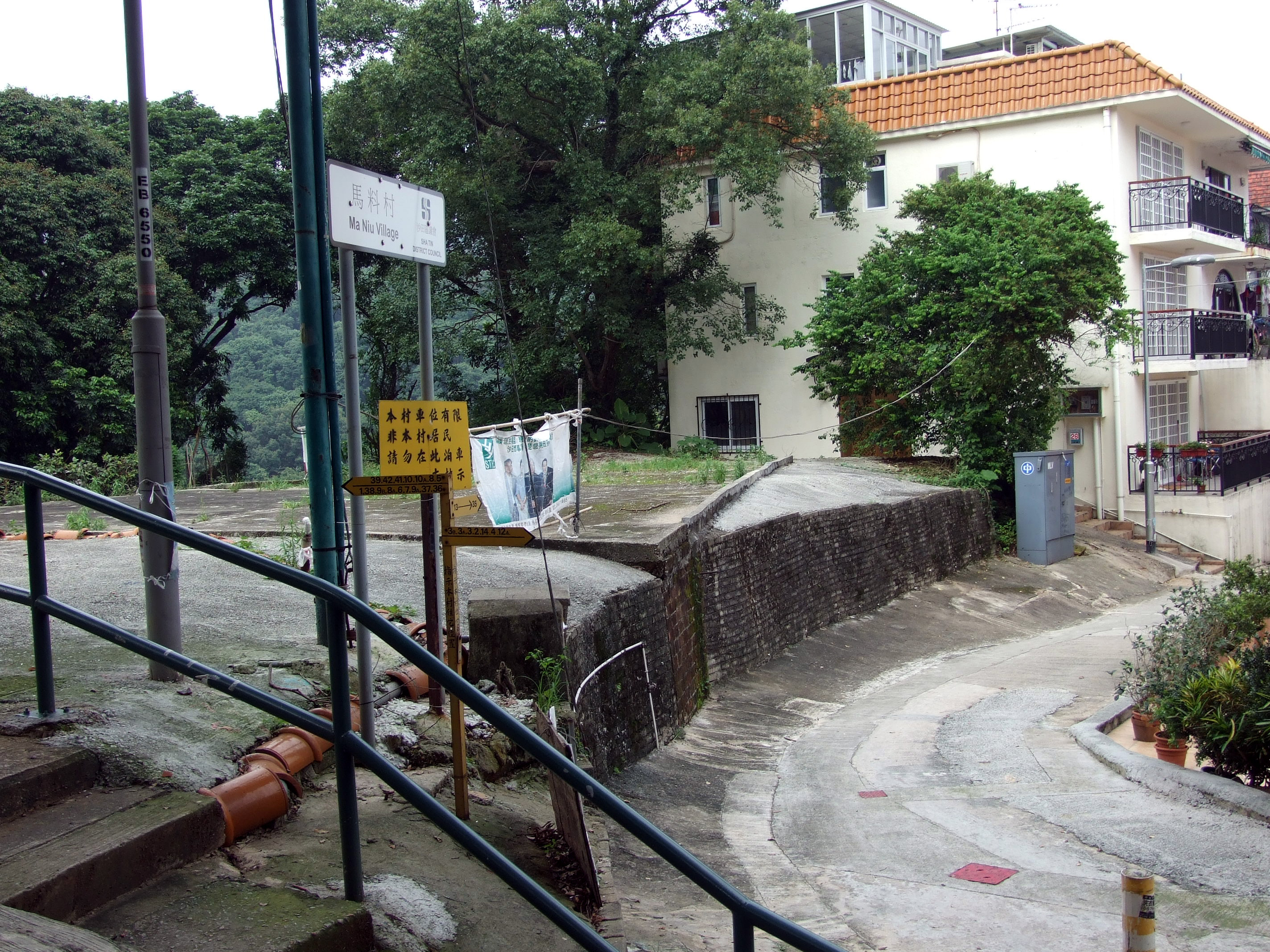
Ma Niu Village in June 2010.

Ma Niu Village (Chinese: 馬料村), sometimes spelled Ma Liu, is a village on Kau To Shan, near Fo Tan, Sha Tin District, Hong Kong.

== Administration ==
Ma Niu is a recognized village under the New Territories Small House Policy.

== History ==
The village historically shared a single higher earthgod shrine with Cheung Lek Mei, Kau To and Ma Liu Shui. All were part of the Fo Tan Yeuk (火炭約).

In the early 20th century, the villagers of Ma Niu generated a large part of their income from selling fuel cut from the extensive woods which were to be found near the village.

== See also ==
- Kau To Hang
- Kau To Village
- Kau Yeuk (Sha Tin)
