= White card (taxi) =

A white card (Chinese: 白牌) is a citizen-owned automobile in Hong Kong used as an illegal unlicensed taxi. The term is a reference to fake taxi licenses. Actually it refers to the white license plates. Before 1983, taxis in Hong Kong had black license plates, while private cars had white license plates. So using a private car as unlicensed taxis was known as "white license plate" (or translated as "white card")

== History ==
White cards have been used since the 1950s, when there was a shortage of public transportation. In the 1950s, Hong Kong taxis were limited in numbers. People started their own illegal businesses, and operated without any licenses or government regulation.

== See also ==
- 1950s in Hong Kong
- Illegal taxicab operation
- Taxicabs of Hong Kong
