= Kau To Hang =

River in Hong Kong

Coordinates: 22.42563°N 114.18129°E

- Chinese: 九肚坑
- Cantonese Yale: gáu tóuh hāang
Transcriptions
Yue: Cantonese
- Yale Romanization: gáu tóuh hāang
- Jyutping: gau2 tou5 haang1

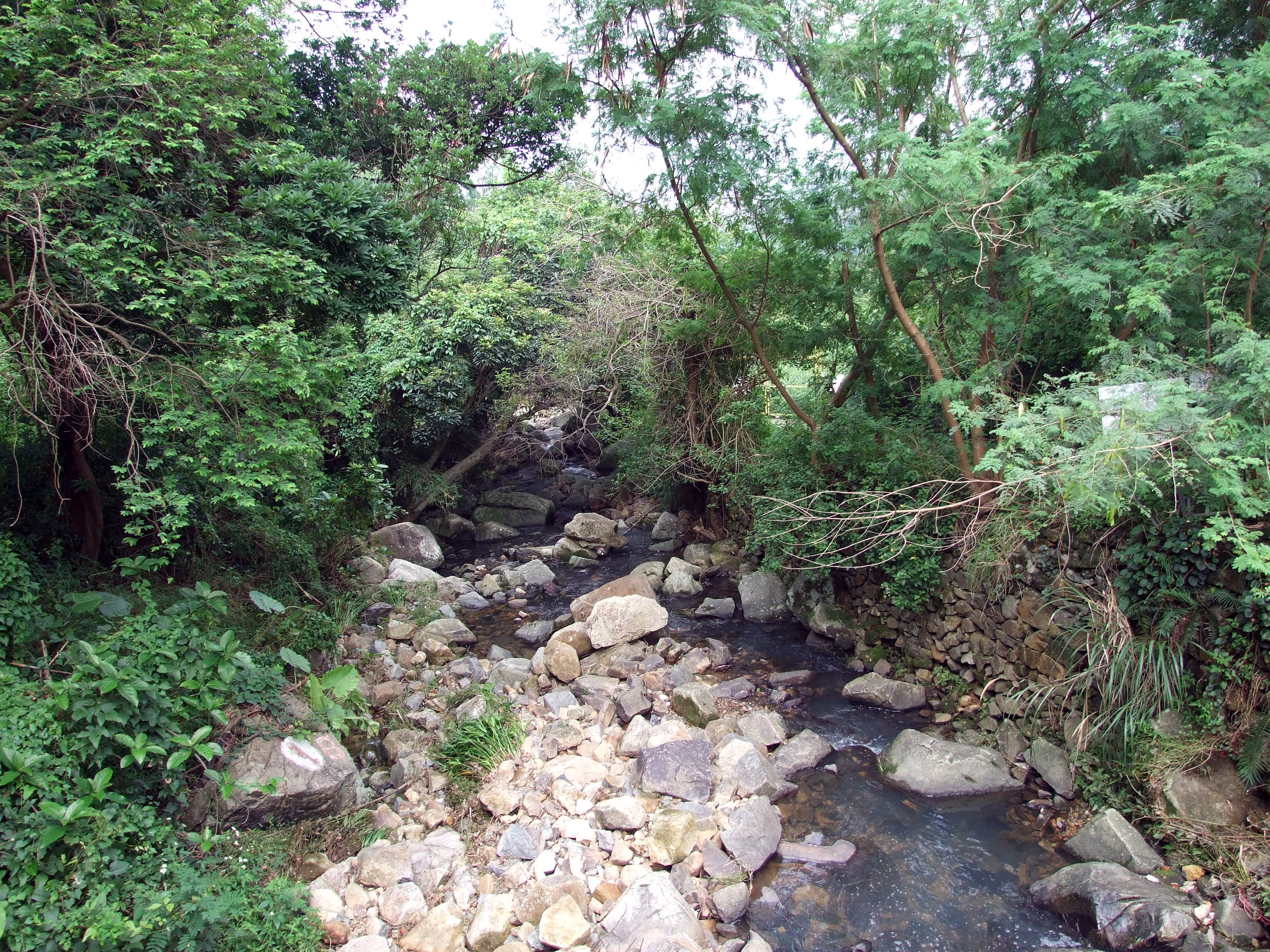
Kau To Hang

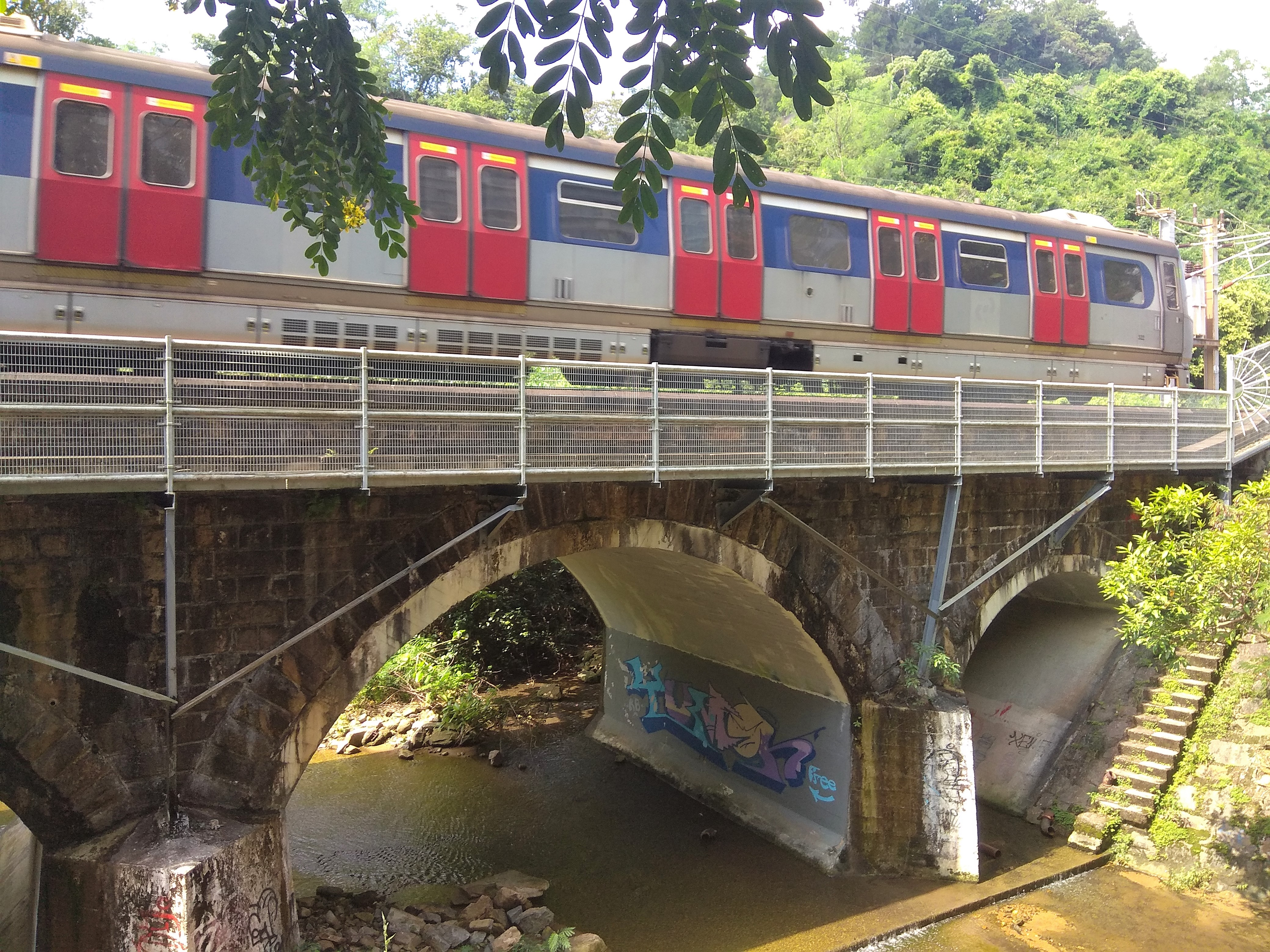
Railway bridge of the East Rail line across Kau To Hang, near University station.

Kau To Hang (Chinese: 九肚坑) is a river in Sha Tin District, New Territories, Hong Kong. Its source starts near Cheung Lek Mei, inside Tai Po Kau Nature Reserve. It flows eastward past Nim Au, Ma Niu, Kau To, collecting minor streams on the way. Finally, it empties into Sha Tin Hoi, part of Tolo Harbour.

== See also ==
- List of rivers and nullahs in Hong Kong
