= Kau To Village =

Village in Hong Kong

Coordinates: 22.410071°N 114.202627°E

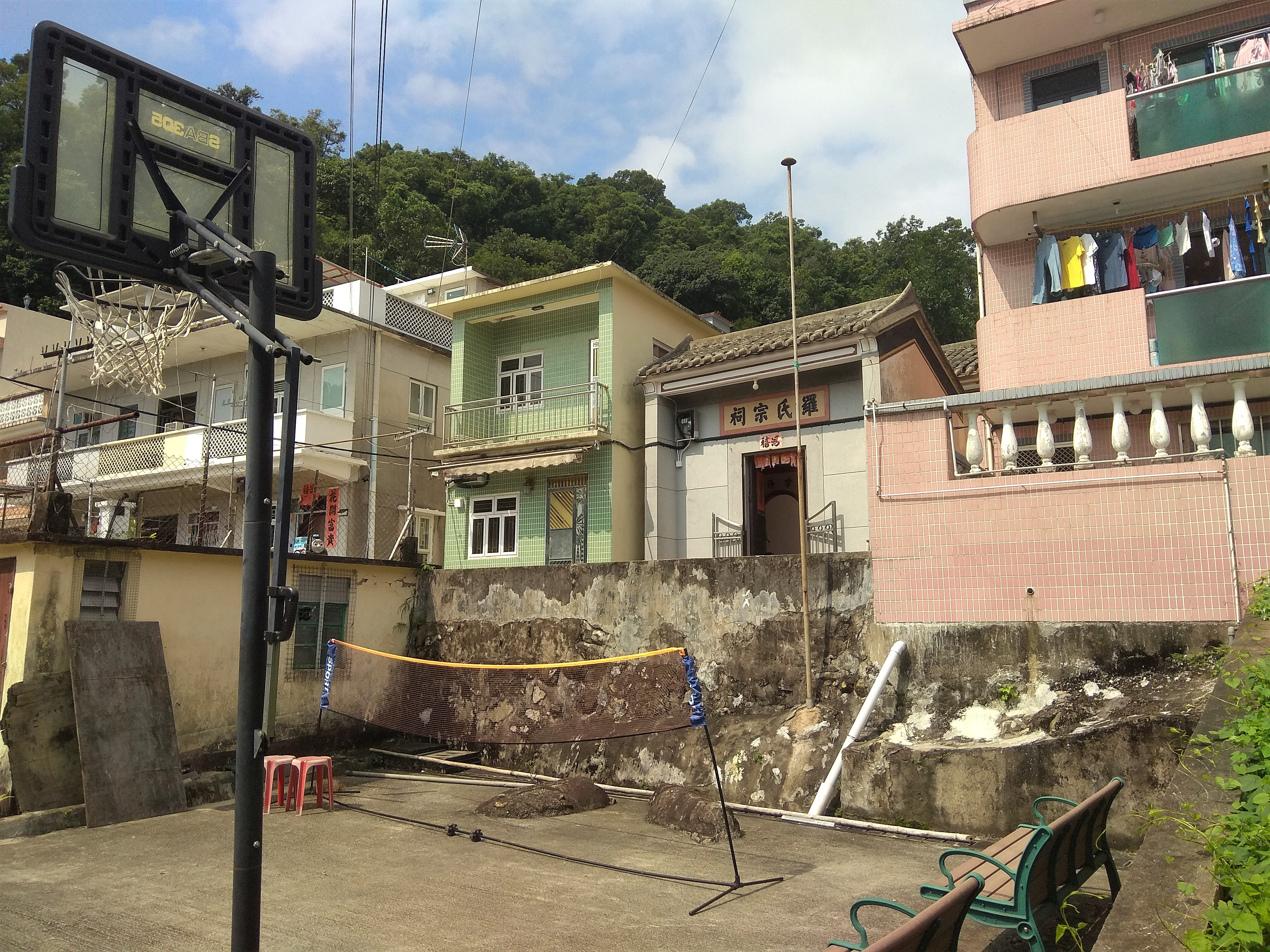
Kau To Village in 2020. Luo (羅) ancestral hall is visible in the centre.

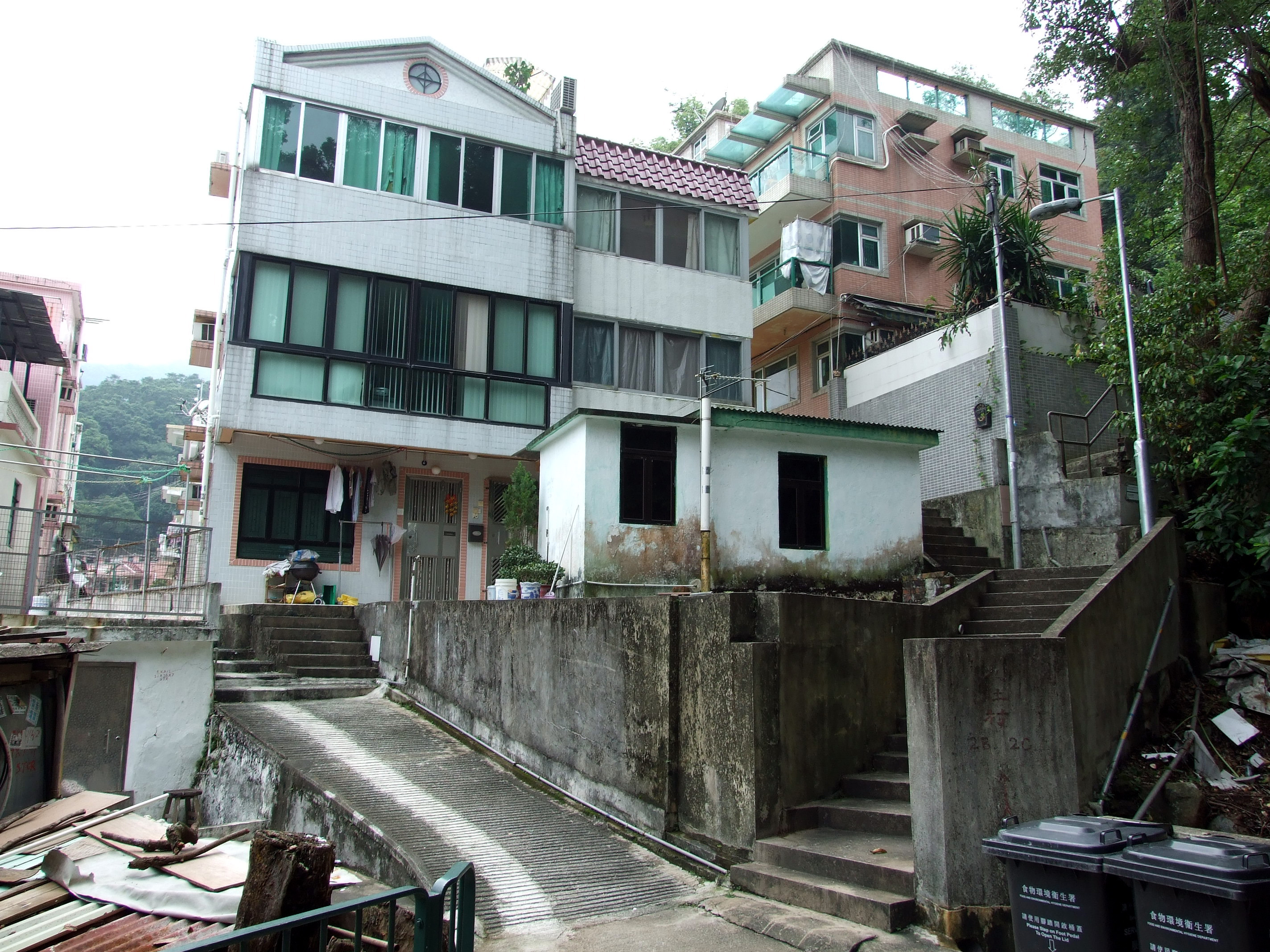
Kau To Village in June 2010.

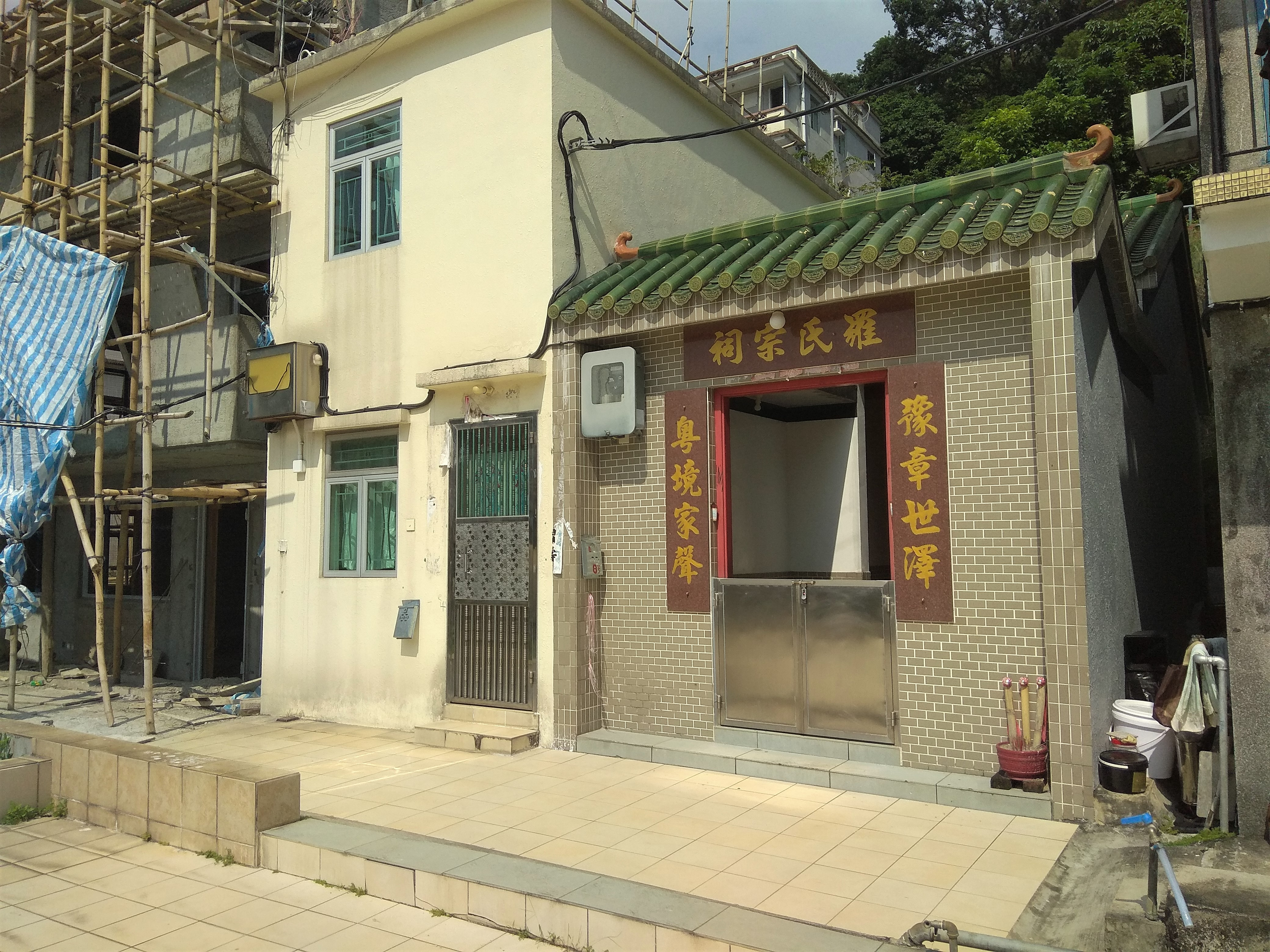
Another Luo (羅) ancestral hall in Kau To Village in 2020.

Kau To Village (Chinese: 九肚村) is a village on Kau To Shan, near Fo Tan, Sha Tin District, Hong Kong.

== Administration ==
Kau To is a recognized village under the New Territories Small House Policy.

== History ==
The village historically shared a single higher earthgod shrine with Cheung Lek Mei, Ma Niu and Ma Liu Shui. All were part of the Fo Tan Yeuk (火炭約). At the time of the 1911 census, the population of Kau To was 130. The number of males was 57.

== See also ==
- Kau To Hang
- Kau Yeuk (Sha Tin)
- Ma Niu Village
