= Illegal taxi operation =

Unlicensed for-hire vehicles

Illegal taxicabs, sometimes known as pirate taxis, gypsy cabs, or jitney cabs, are taxis and other vehicles for hire that operate illegally because they do not have proper licenses, permits, registrations, and accreditations, safety inspections, vehicle insurance, and/or taximeters. Illegal cabs may be marked taxi vehicles or be personal vehicles used by an individual to offer unauthorized taxi-like services. Illegal cabs are prevalent in cities with medallion systems, which restrict the number of legal cabs in operation.

== Terminology by jurisdiction ==
Mainland China: black taxis or black cars (黑车), or blue-plate cars (蓝牌车), referring to the colour of the licence plates.*

Lagos, Nigeria: kabu kabu.

Hong Kong: white card, due to the different licence plate appearance between commercial and non-commercial vehicles.

Malaysia: prebet sapu (sweep privates).

Philippines: colorums.

Madrid: cundas (singular, cunda) - for carrying drug addicts to the meeting point with drug dealers.

Argentina: remises truchos (false taxis).

Norway and Denmark: pirattaxi (pirate taxi).

Gabon: clandos.

Netherlands: snorders; derives from the Yiddish verb snorren, to scrounge, cadge.

Turkey: korsan taksi (pirate taxi).

Vietnam: taxi dù.

== Incidents ==
In 1989, 7 taxi drivers were arrested for operating an illegal taxi operation in Los Angeles.

In Pittsburgh, as of 2015, unlicensed cabs served areas underserved by traditional taxis and public transport, particularly the historically Black Hill District. This was the inspiration for August Wilson's play Jitney (1982), which is set at a Hill District car service office.

As of 2008, unlicensed cabs were also found among the Amish of rural Pennsylvania, who do not drive. Amish taxis can be licensed or unlicensed; in some cases unlicensed taxis are easier to find.

In 2017, 8 illegal taxis were caught in Shanghai via checkpoints.

Also in 2017, 15 illegal taxi drivers were caught in a one-hour undercover sting in Nottingham.

In 2022, residents in Abu Dhabi were warned against using illegal taxis.

In 2023, authorities in Japan warned about using illegal taxis after an increase in tourism.

In the summer of 2023, a motorist was caught operating an illegal taxi in Timoleague, Ireland.

In Ireland, in 2024, 7 vehicles were seized as part of an illegal taxi operation in Derry.

In 2024, illegal taxis in Japan sometimes posed as legal taxis. Authorities were having trouble catching illegal taxis in Gifu Prefecture, many of which were booked online.

Also in 2024, illegal taxis were becoming more popular in Malaysia at universities, and were being ordered via Telegram. They were also accused of aiding in illegal immigration.

In March 2025, a driver was fined for offering illegal taxi rides in Reading, Berkshire.

In 2025, a chef was caught giving illegal taxi rides in Dublin.

Also in 2025, illegal taxis were an issue in Russia and in Dubai.

== See also ==
- Taxi regulation
