= Kau To Shan =

Mountain in Shatin, New Territories

Kau To Shan / Cove Hill
- 狗肚山
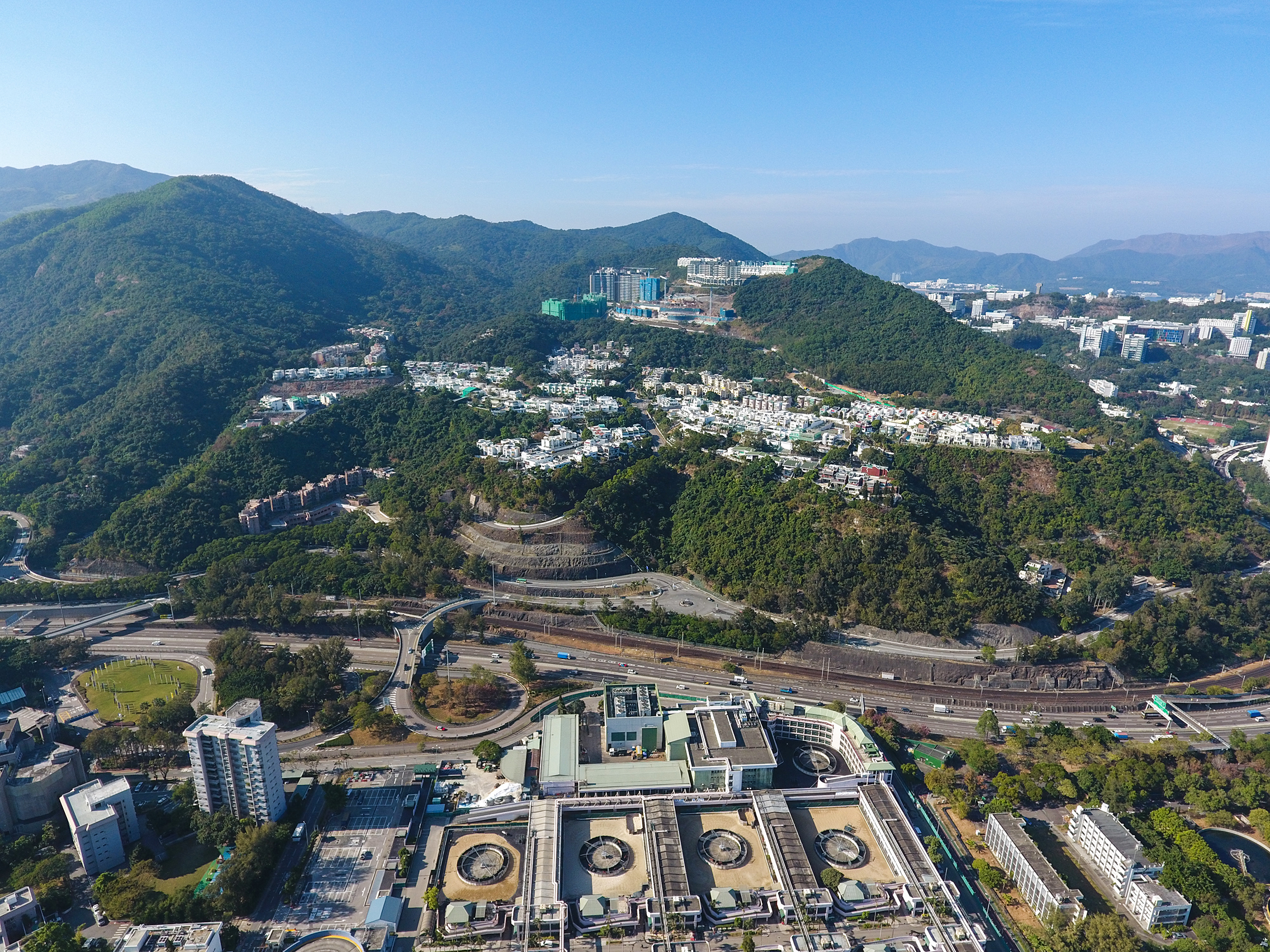
- Kau To Shan is the hill on the left. The Kau To Shan residential area is located on the hills in the centre

Highest point
- Elevation: 399 m (1,309 ft)
- Prominence: 399 m (1,309 ft)
- Coordinates: 22°24′33″N 114°11′30″E

Geography
- Location within Hong Kong
- Location: Sha Tin, Hong Kong

Kau To Shan (Chinese: 狗肚山; Chinese: 九肚山), also known as Cove Hill, is a 399 metres (1,309 ft) tall mountain located in Sha Tin District, in Hong Kong's New Territories.

== Residential area ==
The Kau To Shan mountain area was the source of reclamation sand used for the construction of the Sha Tin Racecourse in the 1970s. Currently, this area, also referred to as Kau To Shan, primarily consists of low-rise, upmarket residences.

== See also ==
- List of mountains, peaks and hills in Hong Kong
- Kau To Village
- Ma Niu Village
- Fo Tan
- Sha Tin
