= Tai Po Kau Nature Reserve =

Nature reserve in Hong Kong

Coordinates: 22.4257°N 114.1811°E

- Traditional Chinese: 大埔滘自然護理區
- Simplified Chinese: 大埔滘自然护理区
Transcriptions
Yue: Cantonese
- Jyutping: Daai6 bou3 gau3 zi6 jin4 wu6 lei5

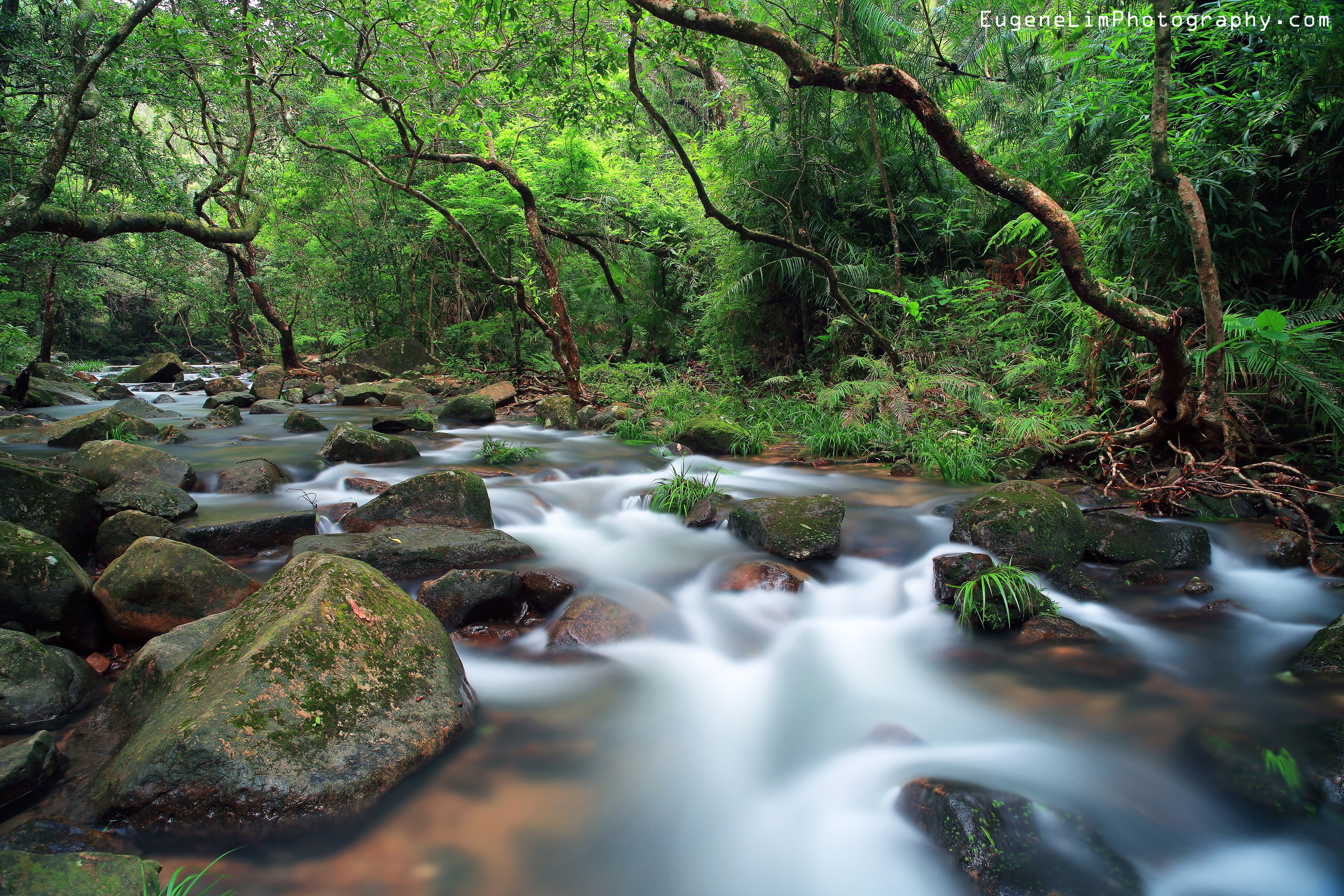
Tai Po Kau Nature Reserve waterfall.

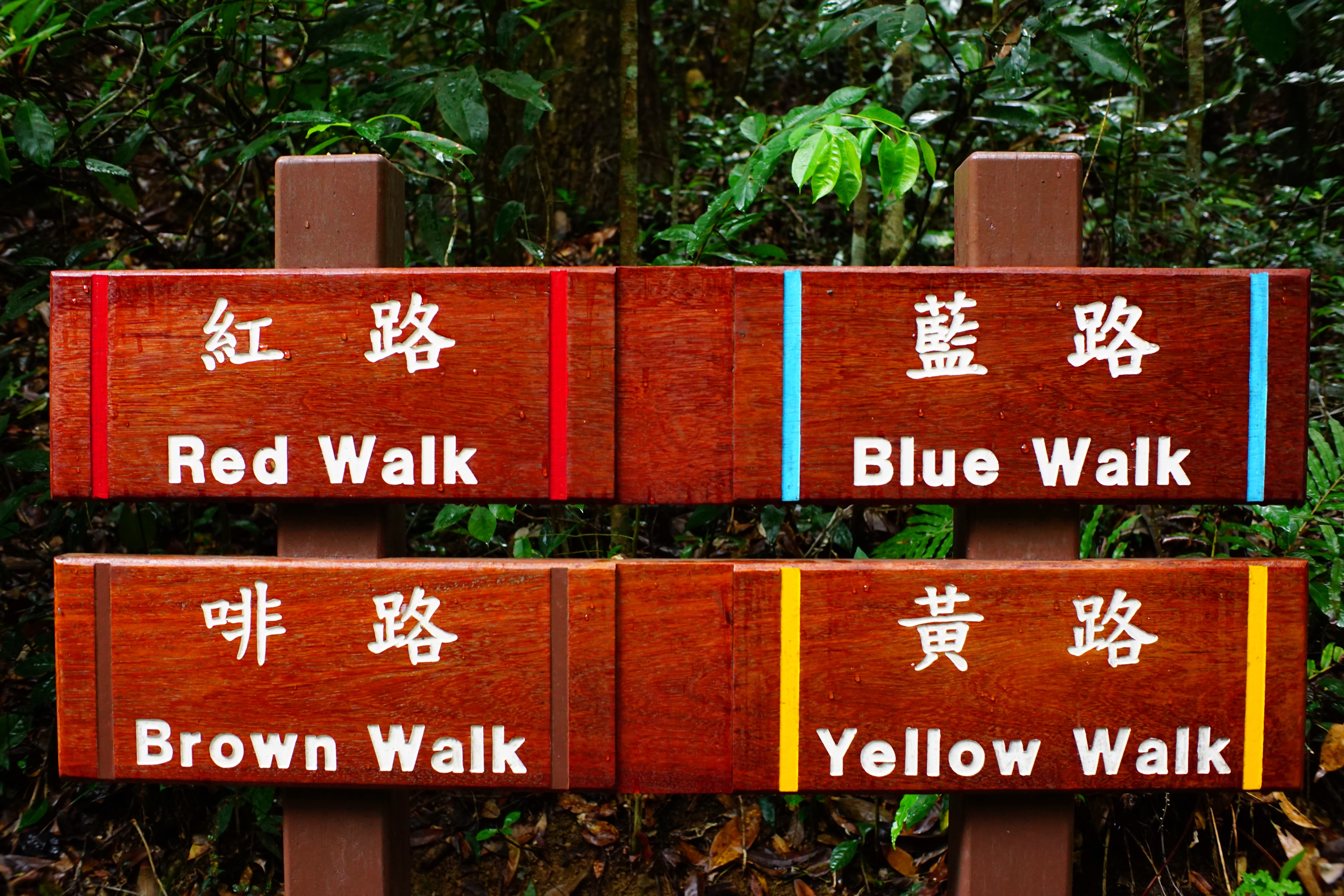
Hiking trails within Tai Po Kau Nature Reserve.

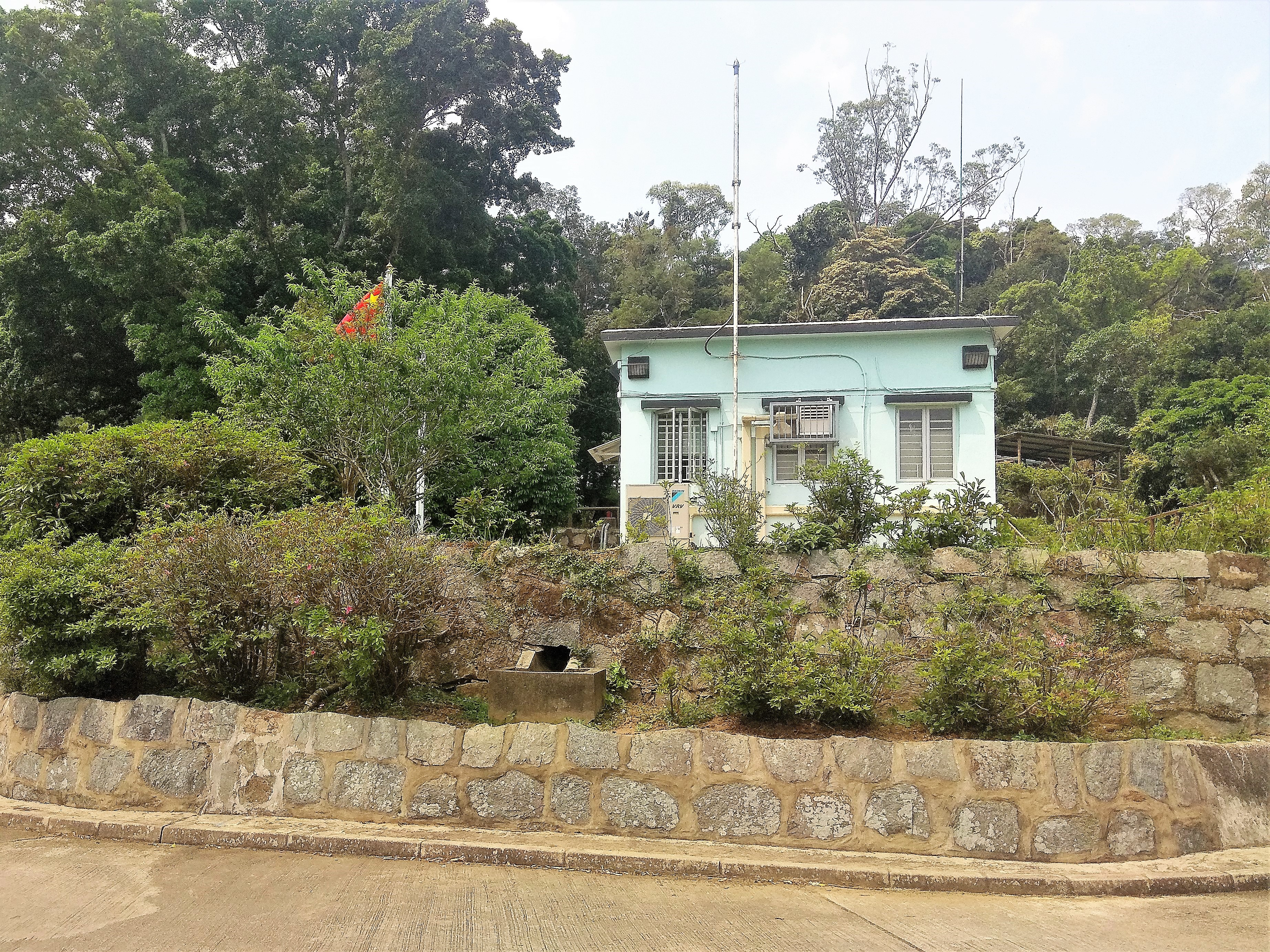
Agriculture, Fisheries and Conservation Department Tai Po Kau Special Area Tai Po Kau Management Centre.

The Tai Po Kau Nature Reserve, also called Tai Po Kau Special Area, is a nature reserve in the Tai Po area of the New Territories in northern Hong Kong. The area comprises a dense, hilly woodland with over 100 species of trees and numerous streams and rivers. It is one of the most biologically diverse forests in Hong Kong. It is noted by the Hong Kong Bird Watching Society and others as one of the best locations for seeing forest birds in Hong Kong.

== Background ==
Around a hundred years ago, the area was barren and deforested. A tree plantation aimed at afforestation was started by the government in 1926, initially consisting of mainly pine. Later on, Taiwan acacia, paperbark, camphor and Brisbane box were also planted. As decades passed, native trees like sweet gum and litsea cubeba started to succeed the planted stock and today a large diversity of both native and nonnative trees grow on the hillsides here. The area was designated as a nature reserve in 1977. South China tigers were reported in the area by villagers into the early 20th century.

== Flora and Fauna ==
160 bird species, 102 butterfly species, and over 50 dragonfly species inhabit the reserve, along with numerous mammals and herpetofauna. The area is noted for its diversity of reptiles, specifically snakes. Common birds include crested bulbul, chestnut-winged cuckoo, collared scops owl, black drongo and spotted dove. Rare mammals like Chinese pangolin and masked palm civet can be found in the reserve. The exceptional biodiversity in Tai Po Kau is due to the maturity of the forest. It is the most expansive mature subtropical secondary forest in Hong Kong at 460 hectares.

== See also ==
- Tai Po Kau
- Kau To Hang
- Conservation in Hong Kong
