= Dynamex Operations West, Inc. v. Superior Court =

California Supreme Court case

- Supreme Court of California

Decided April 30, 2018
- Full case name: Dynamex Operations West, Inc., v. The Superior Court of Los Angeles County and Charles Lee, Real Party in Interest
- Citation(s): 4 Cal.5th 903, 416 P.3d 1, 232 Cal.Rptr.3d 1

Case history
- Prior history: Review granted from 179 Cal.Rptr.3d 69

Holding
- A hiring entity bears the burden of establishing that a worker is an independent contractor not subject to wage order protections. To meet that burden, the hiring entity has to meet each of the three prongs of the ABC test. Applying this test, the Court affirmed the Superior Court's judgment that there were sufficient common interests among Dynamex drivers to certify the class.

Court membership
- Chief Justice: Tani Cantil-Sakauye
- Associate Justices: Ming Chin, Carol Corrigan, Goodwin Liu, Mariano-Florentino Cuéllar, Leondra R. Kruger, Peter Siggins (by designation)

Case opinions
- Majority: Cantil-Sakauye, joined by unanimous
- Superseded by
- Proposition 22 (in part)

Dynamex Operations W. v. Superior Court and Charles Lee, Real Party in Interest, 4 Cal.5th 903 (Cal. 2018) was a landmark case handed down by the California Supreme Court on April 30, 2018. A class of drivers for a same-day delivery company, Dynamex, claimed that they were misclassified as independent contractors and thus unlawfully deprived of employment protections under California’s wage orders. Their claims raised the question of what the appropriate standard was to determine whether workers should be classified as employees or as independent contractors under California’s wage orders.

In a unanimous opinion, the California Supreme Court held that workers are presumptively employees for the purpose of California’s wage orders and that the burden is on the hiring entity to establish that a worker is an independent contractor not subject to wage order protections. The Court also held that in order to establish that a worker is an independent contractor, the hiring entity must prove each of the three parts of the “ABC test.” In applying this new test to Dynamex and its workers, the Court found that there was sufficient commonality of interest among the class of drivers with respect to parts B and C of the test to affirm the class certification issued by the California Court of Appeal. The decision inspired public debate and legislative action on this issue, which culminated when the California Legislature passed Assembly Bill 5 ("AB5") on September 11, 2019. The law codifies the Dynamex holding and extends its protections beyond the wage order context.

== Legal context ==
In employment law, there is a distinction between workers classified as employees as opposed to those classified as independent contractors. If a worker is classified as an employee, their employer must follow a variety of employment laws that protect the worker. These include laws governing minimum wages, overtime, meal and rest breaks as well as other working conditions of employers. Employers also need to pay taxes for social security, workers’ compensation, and unemployment insurance as well as payroll and employment taxes. In contrast, businesses that hire independent contractors to complete work, do not have to meet any of these legal obligations or incur related costs because independent contractors are not protected by employment statutes and regulations.

This legal distinction creates economic incentives for businesses to misclassify workers as independent contractors. Not only do they save on costs stemming from compliance with employment and tax laws, but they obtain an advantage over their competitors who do not misclassify their workers and thus incur these costs. Misclassification can impose costs not just on workers, but on society at large. As both the federal and California governments have recognized, misclassification deprives governments of substantial annual tax revenues and workers from numerous employment law benefits to which they are lawfully entitled. Recognizing the seriousness of this problem, California has imposed substantial civil penalties for misclassifying workers as independent contractors, particularly for “willful” misclassification.

The California courts have long grappled with the appropriate standard for determining whether a worker is properly classified as an employee or an independent contractor for the purpose of California’s employment laws. At common law, the employment relationship was determined by the degree of control over the details of the work being performed.

The California Supreme Court built on this common law foundation when it issued S.G. Borello & Sons, Inc. v. Department of Industrial Relations, its seminal case on the subject. In Borello, the California Supreme Court found that while control over the work performed was the “most significant” factor in determining whether there was an employment relationship under an employment statute, it could not be applied “rigidly and in isolation.” The Court went on to identify other “secondary” factors that should be considered as well. Among these were (1) whether the worker is engaged in a distinct occupation or business; (2) whether the type of work is usually done at the direction of a principal; (3) the level of skill required to perform the occupation in question; (4) whether the hiring entity or the worker provides the place of work, instrumentalities, or tools to do the work; (5) the length of time for which the services are performed; (6) whether the worker is paid by time or by job; (7) whether the work is part of the usual course of business for the hiring entity; and (8) whether or not the parties believe that their relationship is one of employer and employee. Applying these factors is a fact-specific inquiry, with courts looking to the totality of the circumstances, rather than any one particular factor.

In 2010, in Martinez v. Combs, the California Supreme Court offered some additional interpretative gloss on the definition of “employ” in the context of California’s wage orders. Wage orders are “quasi-legislative regulations” enforced by the California Department of Industrial Relations, Division of Labor Standards Enforcement. The orders govern wages and hours as well as basic working conditions like meal and rest breaks on an industry-wide basis. In Martinez, the California Supreme Court considered an action brought by a worker, alleging that his employer had violated a wage order applicable to the industry in which he worked. In considering whether the worker was an employee and thus covered by the applicable wage order, the Court found that the wage order—not the common law—defines the employment relationship in this context. So, the Court looked to the wage order’s text to find three alternative definitions of employment for the purpose of the workers’ action: “(a) to exercise control over the wages, hours or working conditions, or (b) to suffer or permit to work, or (c) to engage, thereby creating a common law employment relationship.”

== Factual background ==
The defendant in this case, Dynamex, was a corporation that offered same-day courier and delivery services nationwide, including in California. Its customers ranged from members of the public to large businesses like Home Depot. Dynamex solicited customers and set the rates for its delivery services.

Dynamex enlisted drivers to complete the pickups and deliveries at the core of its business. Before 2004, Dynamex classified all of its California drivers as employees and compensated them in accordance with California’s wage and hour laws. But starting in 2004, the company chose to classify all of its drivers as independent contractors in order to achieve cost savings associated with avoiding the obligations that those laws impose.

Under this policy, Dynamex hired drivers to provide delivery services for an indefinite period of time, but could terminate this arrangement at any point as long as Dynamex provided three days notice. Drivers could set their own schedule, but had to notify Dynamex in advance of the days they wished to work. On these days, a Dynamex dispatcher would assign available deliveries to drivers, although Dynamex did not guarantee drivers the number or type of deliveries in advance. Drivers could reject delivery requests, but were required to communicate quickly with the dispatcher if they wished to do so.

Compensation depended on the type of delivery, but drivers were either paid a flat fee per delivery or a percentage of the delivery fee paid by the customer. Not included in drivers’ compensation were various tools of the trade, which drivers used to complete their deliveries and were required to purchase themselves. Drivers were required to purchase delivery vehicles as well as any related transportation expenses such as gas, vehicle maintenance, or insurance on their vehicles. Drivers were also required to purchase a Nextel cell phone to communicate with dispatchers. In addition, they were required to purchase Dynamex shirts and badges and wear them while completing deliveries.

== Procedural background ==
In January 2005, Charles Lee, the initial named plaintiff in this case, entered a written agreement with Dynamex to complete deliveries as an independent contractor. After completing 15 days of work for Dynamex, Lee stopped providing delivery services for Dynamex. Three months later, on April 15, 2005, he filed a class action suit against Dynamex in the Los Angeles County Superior Court on behalf of himself and all other similarly-situated Dynamex drivers. He alleged that Dynamex had misclassified its drivers as independent contractors, depriving them of overtime compensation, itemized wage statements, and compensation for business expenses as required by California’s wage orders.

After the Superior Court initially denied class certification and the Court of Appeal reversed, the Superior Court certified a class of approximately 184 drivers who had performed pickup or delivery services for Dynamex between 2001 and the date of the certification order, were classified as independent contractors, and who had responded to questionnaires issued to current and former Dynamex drivers in a timely manner. The class excluded those among this group who employed other drivers or who performed delivery services for their own business or for another company.

In certifying the class, the Superior Court found that the drivers met one of the central requirements of class action: commonality. To meet the requirement, the drivers needed to show that there were enough common issues of law or fact in the case that resolving them collectively would be more efficient for the judicial system and desirable to the parties than if the court reviewed the claims of each driver individually. The Court found that all of the drivers’ claims essentially relied on the same legal claim: Dynamex misclassified drivers as independent contractors. The Superior Court also found that the appropriate standard for determining whether workers are properly classified as independent contractors or employees for the purpose of wage orders was laid out in Martinez. That opinion defines “to employ” in three alternative ways: “(a) to exercise control over the wages, hours or working conditions, (b) to suffer or permit to work, or (c) to engage, thereby creating a common law employment relationship.” After analyzing each of these definitions in the context of the drivers’ claims, the Superior Court found that common questions predominated the case because the first two definitions of employer can be demonstrated through common proof, even if the third common law test required individualized consideration. So, the Superior Court found that the commonality requirement was met and that a class action was a “superior” way to resolve the litigation.

After attempting to renew their decertification motion, Dynamex asked the California Court of Appeal to overrule the Superior Court’s order denying Dynamex’s motion to decertify. With respect to the drivers’ claims arising under the applicable wage order, the Court of Appeal denied Dynamex’s request, finding that the Superior Court had properly relied on the three alternative definitions of employment from Martinez in analyzing the drivers’ class certification.

Dynamex then petitioned for review of the Court of Appeal’s decision with the California Supreme Court. Dynamex argued that the Superior Court had erred because the definitions of employment offered by Martinez were only applicable to the determination of whether an entity is a joint employer of the workers in question. Instead, Dynamex argued, the multi-factor common law test from Borello controlled the determination of whether a hiring entity was an employer in the wage order context.

The California Supreme Court granted review in order to consider the question of what the appropriate standard was for determining whether a workers is properly classified as an employee or an independent contractor for the purpose of obligations imposed by an applicable wage order.

== Opinion of the court ==
Writing for a unanimous California Supreme Court, Chief Justice Cantil-Sakauye affirmed the Court of Appeal’s order regarding class certification. In so holding, the Court first found that the “suffer or permit to work” standard was the appropriate one for determining whether particular workers are employees within the definition of an applicable wage order. The Chief Justice wrote that this standard offers “the broadest definition” for the employment relationship and one far broader than the common law, “right to control” definition. She went on to explain that like a similar standard in the Fair Labor Standards Act, the “suffer or permit” definition was meant to extend coverage of statutory protections to the “widest class of workers that reasonably fall within reach of [the statute].” She went on to explain that this “exceptionally broad” standard was justified by the underlying purpose of wage orders: to provide a minimum level of sustenance for workers and their families. And as she further noted, an inclusive standard protects law-abiding businesses from unfair competition and the public at large from accruing societal costs associated with workers who are paid less than a living wage or forced to work in poor conditions.

The Court then considered different tests for interpreting the “suffer or permit” standard. It turned first to tests with many factors like the Borello test or economic realities test used by courts in interpreting Fair Labor Standards Act claims. As the Court described, these tests attempt to consider all of the circumstances on a case-by-case basis in determining whether a worker is an employee or an independent contractor. But the Court opined that this approach has two serious disadvantages. First, they leave both hiring entities and their workers unsure of how workers should be classified, which often means that this determination is only made in courts after protracted litigation. Second, when a test has many factors, it becomes more malleable, allowing employers flexibility to structure their relationships with workers so as to avoid wage and hour liability.

The Court then reached the principle holding of the case, interpreting the “suffer or permit” standard in the wage order context. The Court held that the hiring entity bears the burden of “establish[ing] that a worker is an independent contractor” and thus, “not intended to be included within the wage order’s coverage.” The Court went on hold that in order for the entity to meet this burden, it must establish each of three factors, in what is called the “ABC test”:

(A) that the worker is free from the control and direction of the hiring entity in connection with the performance of the work, both under the contract for the performance of the work and in fact; and (B) that the worker performs work that is outside the usual course of the hiring entity's business; and (C) that the worker is customarily engaged in an independently established trade, occupation, or business of the same nature as the work performed.

Under this test, unless the hiring entity meets each of these three factors, the worker is considered an employee under the “suffer or permit to work standard” for the purpose of wage orders. Said another way, if the hiring entity fails to meet any one of these factors, then that is sufficient to show that the worker is an employee. The Court noted that it felt that this test would minimize the disadvantages of multi-factored tests and “provide greater clarity and consistency, and less opportunity for manipulation.”

The Chief Justice went on to apply this standard to the relationship between Dynamex and its drivers. She held that under this interpretation of the “suffer or permit” standard, there were enough common interests by class members to justify the Superior Court’s certification of the proposed class of drivers. The Court found “two independently sufficient reasons for this holding. First, with respect to part B of the test, the Court found that there was sufficient commonality of interest as to whether the work performed by the drivers was outside the usual course of Dynamex’s business because deliveries were the core of Dynamex’s business. Second, with respect to part C of the test, the Court held that there was sufficient commonality of interest as to whether the drivers were engaged in an independently established trade, occupation, or business. Here, the Court found that it persuasive that prior to 2004, drivers were classified as employees. So, questions under both parts B and C of the test were amenable on a class-wide basis. Expressed another way, anyone subject to wage orders is going to be hired for work that is central to the employer's business and is not going to be hired as a business themselves. Thus they will fail B and C of the ABC test and must be hired as an employee.

== Significance ==
The Dynamex decision inspired swift action by the California State Legislature. In December 3, 2018, Assemblywoman Lorena Gonzalez introduced Assembly Bill 5—or “AB5,” as it is commonly known. AB5 expressed intent in its text to “codify” the Dynamex decision and “clarify the decision’s application in state law.” As the Assemblywoman explained, “the courts had clearly had enough of these suits. From that day on, we said we’d really like to work on this.” The legislature also expressed its intent “to ensure workers who are currently exploited by being misclassified as independent contractors instead of recognized as employees have the basic rights and protections they deserve under the law.” Later versions of the bill extend the AB5 test to apply to various Labor Code provisions and wage orders as well as the unemployment insurance code. A final version of the bill incorporating these amendments was passed on September 11, 2019 and signed into law on September 18, 2019. The new law went into effect on January 1, 2020.

The Dynamex decision and AB5 were met with resistance in the business community including the California Chamber of Commerce. In particular, gig economy platforms like Uber, Lyft, and Doordash, whose business model depends on the classification of workers as independent contractors, opposed the decision and the legislation from its inception. A coalition of these companies and their allies pledged $110 million to secure a ballot initiative to overturn the legislation, an effort which included requiring its workers to publicly support the measure. Proposition 22 passed in November 2020. Some workers have opposed AB5 as well, concerned that employment classification will cause them to lose work.

== Additional scholarly resources ==
1. The Harvard Law Review Association, Labor and Employment Law – Worker Status – California Adopts the ABC Test to Distinguish Between Employees and Independent Contractors – Assemb. B. 5, 2019–2020 Leg., Reg. Sess. (Cal. 2019)(Enacted)(Codified at Cal. Lab. Code §§ 2750.3, 3351 and Cal. Unemp. Ins. Code §§ 606.5, 621), 133 Harv. L. Rev. 2435 (May 2020).
2. Gould IV, William B., Dynamex is Dynamite, But Epic Systems Is Its Foil – Chamber of Commerce: The Sleeper In The Trilogy, 83 Mo. L. Rev. 989 (Fall 2018).
3. Cunningham-Parmeter, Keith, Gig-Dependence: Finding The Real Independent Contractors of Platform Work, 39 N. Ill. U. L. Rev. 379 (2019).
4. Burdick, Ben, Dynamex Operations West, Inc. v. Superior Court, 40 Berkeley J. Emp. & Lab. L. 169 (2019).
5. Rosenfeld, Abigail S., ABC to AB 5: The Supreme Court of California Modernizes Common Law Doctrine in Dynamex Operations West, Inc. v. Superior Court, 61 B.C. L. Rev. E-Supplement II. – 112 (March 2020).
