= All India Gig Workers Union =

AIGWU
- Founded: August 2020
- Type: Trade union
- Location: India
- Field: Food delivery
- Affiliations: Centre of Indian Trade Unions
- Website: Facebook page

The All India Gig Workers Union (AIGWU) is a trade union federation of gig economy workers, predominantly in food delivery, in India. The federation is affiliated with the Centre of Indian Trade Unions.

== History ==
AIGWU was founded in August 2020 during protests of Swiggy workers against a pay reduction. During these protests, AIGWU moved from organic outbursts to a strategically thinking organisation.

In December 2020, AIGWU and other Indian trade unions, including the Indian Federation of App-based Transport Workers, called on the Ministry of Labour to not exempt gig companies from contributions to state social security.

In October 2021, AIGWU reacted positively to a push by the Indian government to reclassify gig work as employment.
