= Gig worker =

Independent on-demand temporary workers

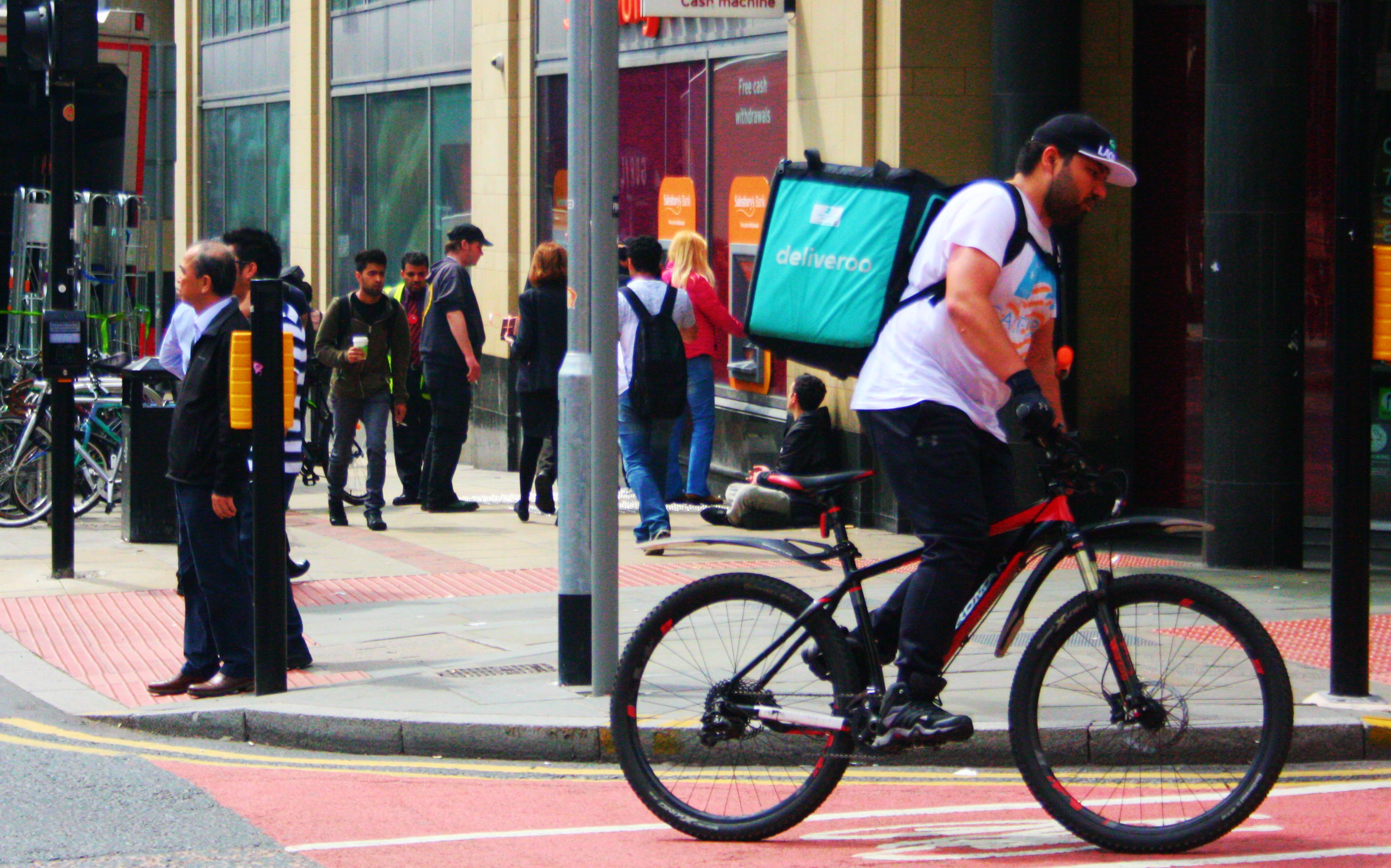
A Deliveroo cycle delivery worker in Manchester, England

Gig workers are independent contractors, online platform workers, contract firm workers, on-demand workers, and temporary workers. Gig workers enter into formal agreements with on-demand companies to provide services to the company's clients. They are part of the gig economy.

In many countries, the legal classification of gig workers is still being debated, with companies classifying their workers as "independent contractors", while organized labor advocates have been lobbying for them to be classified as "employees", which would legally require companies to provide the full suite of employee benefits like time-and-a-half for overtime, paid sick time, employer-provided health care, bargaining rights, and unemployment insurance, among others. In 2020, California approved by popular vote Proposition 22, which created a third-worker classification of gig-worker-drivers as contractors but maintained certain benefits such as minimum wage and mileage reimbursement.

== Etymology of gig ==
Gig has various meanings in English, but it has two modern meanings: any paid job or role, especially for a musician or a performer and any job, especially one that is temporary.

The earliest usage of the word gig in the sense of "any, usually temporary, paid job" is from a 1952 piece by Jack Kerouac about his gig as a part-time brakeman for the Southern Pacific Railroad.

== Background ==
In the 2000s, the digital transformation of the economy and industry accelerated due to advances in information and communication technologies, such as the Internet, and the popularization of smartphones. As a result, on-demand platforms based on digital technology have created jobs and employment forms that are differentiated from existing offline transactions by the level of accessibility, convenience, and price competitiveness.

Normally, "work" refers to a full-time job with set working hours and benefits. But the definition of work began to change with shifting economic conditions and ongoing technological advances, and these changes in the economy created a new labor force characterized by independent, contractual labor.

Uberisation or uberization is a neologism describing the commercialization of an existing service industry by new participants using computing platforms, such as mobile applications, to aggregate transactions between clients and providers of a service, often bypassing the role of existing intermediaries as part of the so-called platform economy. This business model has different operating costs compared to a traditional business.

Uberization is derived from the company name "Uber". Uberization has also raised concerns about government regulations and taxation, insofar as the formalized application of the sharing economy has led to disputes over the extent to which providers of services via an Uberized platform should be held accountable for corporate regulations and tax obligations. In 2018, 36% of US workers joined in the gig economy through either their primary or secondary jobs. The number of people working in major economies is generally less than 10 percent of the economically viable population, according in Europe, 9.7% of adults from 14 EU countries participated in the gig economy in 2017, according to the survey. Meanwhile, it is estimated that the gig worker size, which covers independent or non-conventional workers, is 20% to 30% of the economically active population in the United States and Europe.

A 2016 study by the McKinsey Global Institute concluded that across America and England, 162 million people were engaged in some form of independent work. Moreover, their payment is linked to the gigs they perform, which could be deliveries, rentals, or other services.

Because much of gig work can be done online, gig workers find themselves competing with one another in a 'planetary labour market'.

== Distinctions ==
=== Temporary workers ===
Many factors go into a desirable job, and the best employers focus on the aspects of work that are most attractive to today's increasingly competitive and fluid labor force. Traditional workers have a long–term employer–employee relationship in which the worker is paid by the hour or year, earning a wage or salary. Outside of that arrangement, work tends to be temporary, or project-based, and workers are hired to complete a particular task or for a certain period of time. Coordination of jobs through an on-demand company reduces entry and operating costs for providers and allows workers' participation to be more transitory in gig markets (i.e., they have greater flexibility around work hours). Freelancers sell their skills to maximize their freedom, while full-time gig workers leverage digital service-on-demand platforms and job matching apps to level up their skills. Another example of temporary workers may be digital nomads. Digital nomads lead a mobile lifestyle that combines work and leisure, requiring a particular set of skills and equipment. Gig work enables digital nomads by offering flexible, location-independent job opportunities that can be performed remotely, typically through digital platforms, allowing for a lifestyle of travel and work anywhere with internet connectivity.

=== Zero-hour contract employment ===
It is important to distinguish employment in the sharing economy from employment through zero-hour contracts, a term primarily used in the United Kingdom to refer a contract in which an employer is not obliged to provide any minimum number of working hours to an employee. Employment in the gig economy entails receiving compensation based on a single key performance indicator, such as the number of parcels delivered or taxi lifts conducted. Another feature is that employees can opt to refuse to take an order. Although employers do not have to guarantee employment, and employees can refuse to take an order under a zero-hour contract, workers under such a contract are paid by the hour rather than directly through business-related indicators, as in the gig economy.

=== Ghost work ===
Ghost work is a specific type of labor that is typically task-based and invisible to the end user. Ghost workers work on discrete tasks for a company, but they do not have a relationship with the company beyond assignment of the task and the minimal training necessary. A key characteristic of ghost work is completing small tasks to support machine learning or automation.

=== Cybertariat ===
Cybertariat denotes precarious workers or also impoverished middle classes subordinated to an algorithmic decision-making system. The algorithmic architecture of digital labor platforms is believed to concentrate benefits and reduce the base for subsistence of cybertariat. Cybertariats represents an integration of the digital work with physical space. The cybertariat can work anytime and from anywhere, can be hired and fired at will. The cybertariat workers work mostly anonymously in virtual identity. The term is introduced by Ursula Huws.

== Advantages and disadvantages ==
Gig workers have high levels of flexibility, autonomy, task variety, and complexity. The gig economy has also raised some concerns. First, these jobs generally confer few employer-provided benefits and workplace protections. Second, technological developments occurring in the workplace have come to blur the legal definitions of the terms "employee" and "employer" in ways that were unimaginable when employment regulations in the United States, like the Wagner Act of 1935 and the Fair Labor Standards Act of 1938 were written. These mechanisms of control can result in low pay, social isolation, working unsociable and irregular hours, overwork, sleep deprivation, and exhaustion.

According to a 2021 report by the World Health Organization and the International Labour Organization the expansion of the gig economy can be seen as one significant factor for the increase in worker deaths for those who work over 55 hours a week (relative to those who work 35–40), rising from 600,000 deaths in 2000 to 750,000 in 2016. The report found that in 2016, 9% of the world's population worked more than 55 hours weekly, and this was more prevalent among men, as well as workers in the Western Pacific and South-East Asia regions. Work has also been associated with poor mental health outcomes amongst gig workers.

== Gender disparities ==
There are several gender differences in gig work, from the number of women participating to the wage gap. Globally, the gender differences in participation of women in the gig economy differ. For example, in the United States, female gig workers account for 55% of the gig workforce. In India, 28% of the gig workforce consists of women. The platform economy has been described as conferring a professional status that allows women to participate in paid work without disrupting social hierarchies and while managing household and childcare responsibilities. The advent of home service providers and beauticians within the gig economy has led to the formalizing and feminization of casual labor, dubbed "pink collar work".

In October 2021, India's first women-led gig workers' strike was led by 100 women agitating outside the office of Urban Company in Gurugram, Haryana, a platform that provides at-home services, protesting "low wages, high commissions and poor safety conditions". This led to a lawsuit being filed by Urban Company against its workers for "instigating violence against the Company". The lawsuit stated that Urban Company was an aggregator connecting customers to independent workers and sought a permanent prohibitory injunction from the court against protests by the Urban Company employees. The protest was eventually called off following the imposition of Section 144 of the Criminal Procedure Code in Gurugram.

The gig economy is ostensibly less gender-segregated worldwide than the traditional labor market. However, women across the world continue to protest against gender gaps such as lower wages and working hours, and the lack of flexibility. The COVID-19 pandemic highlighted the need for worker protections for women who work in the gig economy for supplemental income.

=== Gender and type of work ===
Gig work has witnessed a similar gendered division to that found in traditional work. The platform economy has particularly attracted female service providers due to the flexibility it offers. For example, 80% of women on DoorDash said that flexibility is the main reason they pursue gig work. One reason for this is that many women need to balance work with familial responsibilities and are therefore more likely than men to participate in gig work due to scheduling reasons. For many women, platform-based food delivery work also provides an opportunity to monetize previously unpaid domestic skills like food shopping.

Platform-based work is also highly segregated by gender. Men in the gig economy typically perform traditionally male tasks, most notably transportation. A study in Australia found that the most common task for male gig workers was driving, particularly for Uber. Women, on the other hand, tend to perform traditionally female tasks like food shopping, care work, cleaning, and creative jobs like graphic design and writing tasks.

There has also been a recent rise in women joining the delivery economy. Women now make up just under half of the delivery people on the Uber Eats platform and DoorDash now reports that 58% of their delivery drivers are women. Aside from the flexibility, women tend to prefer delivery work to ride-sharing work because of safety concerns in being a female driver in ride-sharing services. There have been various accounts of sexual harassment claims filed by female Uber drivers.

A 2019 safety report released by Uber reported 6,000 incidents of sexual assault from 2017-2018 experienced by both riders and drivers. Despite the prevalence of harassment and assault, platforms do little to protect women from bias, harassment, and violence. Some platforms have implemented preventative measures to protect both customers and workers. Most notably, Uber now requires drivers to complete anti-sexual violence training, and their app now includes a 'panic button' feature that connects users to 911 dispatchers; these measures are widely believed to be insufficient. For instance, women often face drunken and disorderly customers and are left to deal with potentially dangerous individuals on their own with little support from platforms, which provide minimal guidelines for how to respond in dangerous situations. Gender stereotypes and customer bias also mean that customers are more likely to challenge women's decisions, making it difficult for female drivers to defend themselves and advocate for themselves in customer interactions.

The way many platforms are designed also pressures workers, particularly women, to sacrifice their safety to maintain their standing on the platform. Platforms like Uber assign work based on the ratings workers receive from customers. Low ratings can result in a worker receiving less work or being removed from the platform entirely, creating an environment where workers often tolerate some level of harassment to avoid a low rating that may jeopardize their earnings.

Assault and harassment also place undue financial burdens on female gig workers. Since gig workers are typically categorized as independent contractors, they are not extended the protections and benefits of traditional employees. For instance, independent contractors are not covered by the United States' Fair Labor Standards Act (FLSA). As a result, if a worker needs to take time off to recover from harassment or assault that they experienced while working on a platform, the financial burden of that recovery time falls entirely on the worker, which means that many women continue to work under conditions that feel unsafe to avoid a loss of income.

=== Gender and pay ===
The literature on the gender pay gap in the platform economy is mixed. But many studies show that women continue to earn less than men, even in platform-based economies. The gender pay gap for platform-based work is also typically similar in magnitude to the pay gap observed for sectors outside the gig economy. One analysis of Uber drivers in the United States found that on average, women earned about 7% less than their male counterparts. On Amazon's platform, Mechanical Turk (MTurk), which allows companies to hire people to perform simple online tasks that are difficult to automate, women earned about 10.5% less per hour of work than men, largely because women tended to take breaks between tasks rather than working continuously through a series of tasks to accommodate caregiving responsibilities, particularly young children.

Many workers cite flexibility as a primary reason for choosing to engage in gig work, however that flexibility is subject to some limitations that may have gendered impacts. The primary limitation is that imposed by surge pricing. By tying pricing to demand, surge pricing incentivizes workers to be online during high-traffic or high-demand times. Surge pricing times may conflict with non-work commitments like caregiving responsibilities, creating a trade-off between flexibility and higher earnings.

== Future ==
Measuring the size of the gig workforce is difficult because of the different definitions of what constitutes "gig work"; limitations in the methods used to collect data via household surveys versus information from business establishments; and differing legal definitions of workers under tax, workplace, and other public policies.

The emergence of gig work has been linked to broad changes in the economy. Advances in globalization and technology put pressure on companies to respond quickly to market changes. Securing labor through nontraditional arrangements, such as gig work, will enable companies to adjust their workforce size quickly. This can help companies increase their profits. From this point of view, unconventional gig work is a fundamental component of today's economy and is unlikely to disappear anytime soon.

In their book, The Gig Economy, Woodcock and Graham outline four pathways to worker-friendly futures for the gig economy: increased transparency, better regulation, stronger collective organisation of workers, and platforms run as cooperatives or public infrastructures.

== By location ==
=== Africa ===
When it comes to gig workers in Africa, there are significant variations across different countries. Sub-Saharan Africa accounts for 13% of the world's workforce, and over 85% of employment in Africa is informal.

=== Asia ===
==== India ====
NITI Aayog defines 'gig workers' as those engaged in work outside of the traditional employer-employee arrangement. In 2020–21, the gig economy was estimated to employ 7.7 million workers, with a projected workforce of 23.5 million by 2029–30. The industry is expected to produce a revenue of $455 billion by 2024. 47% of gig workers are employed in medium-skilled jobs, about 22% in high-skilled jobs, and about 31% in low-skilled jobs.

93% of the Indian population is employed in the informal economy, which depends on local linguistic, ethnic, and regional dynamics and networks. The technologization of informal labor with app-based work has obviated the need to navigate these local systems for work and payment. Rural-to-urban migrants form a majority of the gig workforce, which serves as an intermediary work settlement and an alternative to unregulated contractors who place them at risk of trafficking and other forms of exploitation. Class and caste identities that have historically been excluded from the formal labor market have utilized the gig economy as a means to escape discrimination. However, the term "platform paternalism" has emerged to describe the perpetuation of caste and class hierarchies, trapping workers in jobs with very little security and no potential for long-term growth. For instance, caste-oppressed women continue to dominate low-paying work, such as cleaning and washing in households. BookMyBai, a platform service that helps people hire house-maids and caretakers, has provisions to request workers from specific geographic regions and religions. This has been criticized for perpetuating caste-based discrimination.

The Indian Federation of App-based Transport Workers and the Telangana Gig and Platform Workers Union currently have 36,000 and 10,000 members respectively, including cab drivers, food and grocery delivery workers, and e-commerce delivery persons. Some of the demands of these unions include security benefits, higher base fares, and protection against exploitation by aggregator companies.

In response, the Indian parliament passed new laws guaranteeing social security and occupational health and safety of gig workers in 2020. These laws are yet to be implemented. In its 2021 report, NITI Aayog also recommended fiscal incentives including tax breaks or startup grants for companies with about one-third of their workforce as women and people with disabilities. Securing social protection coverage, improving national statistics on gig and platform work and policy options, and discussing insurance and tax-financed schemes for gig platforms have been delineated as key priorities for the G20 summit 2023, held at Delhi, India. On 24 July 2023, the Rajasthan legislative assembly approved a groundbreaking bill that provides social security benefits to gig workers, making it the first of its kind in India. The Rajasthan Platform-Based Gig Workers (Registration and Welfare) Bill, 2023, aims to enlist all gig workers and aggregators operating in the state, ensuring they receive essential social security protections. Additionally, the bill establishes a mechanism for gig workers to voice and address their grievances.

==== South Korea ====
Gig work is spreading into side jobs and the delivery business. Kakao has hired drivers to build a proxy-driving system, and the delivery team is meeting the surging demand through a near-field delivery service called "Vamin Connect". There is a gig-work platform for professional freelancers, not just for work. The platform, which connects those seeking skilled professionals with those with skills, offers 10 types of services, including design, marketing, computer programming, translation, document writing, and lessons. However, "gig worker" is not yet very welcome in Korea. This is because many "gig workers" have conflicts with existing services, exposing a lack of social and legal preparation.

==== Southeast Asia ====
Gig work in Southeast Asia has been growing rapidly since 2010; according to World Bank estimates in 2019, the gig work population has experienced a consistent 30% annual growth rate.

Although there is already a large informal sector in many Southeast Asian countries, the growing number of gig workers in the region is increasing demand for labor regulations to protect workers from unfair labor practices. The pandemic has highlighted this concern and shone light on the vulnerability of gig workers in Southeast Asia. In Indonesia, ojek drivers in particular were left without either a social safety net or health protection.

The Platform Workers Act regulates gig work in Singapore since January 2025. Worker benefits include higher Central Provident Fund contribution rates, work injury compensation insurance, collective bargaining power through Platform Work Associations, and more.

=== Australia ===
In Australia, the gig economy includes services such as ride sharing, food delivery, and various types of personal services for a fee. It is against the law for an employer to classify a worker as an independent contractor when they are, in fact, an employee. Where this happens, the business could be liable for penalties under the Fair Work Act, and have to backpay the entitlements.

=== Europe ===
When it comes to platform workers in Europe, there are significant differences across countries. The UK has the highest incidence of platform work. Other countries with high relative values are Germany, the Netherlands, Spain, Portugal, and Italy. By contrast, Finland, Sweden, France, Hungary, and Slovakia show very low values compared to the rest. The typical European platform worker is a young male. A typical platform worker is likely to have a family and kids, and, regardless of age, they tend to have fewer years of labour market experience than the average worker. The majority of platform workers provide more than one type of service and are active on two or more platforms. While flexibility and autonomy are frequently mentioned motivations for platform workers, so too is the lack of alternatives.

One controversial issue, though not unique to Europe, is the employment status of platform workers. In most cases, the providers of labour services via platforms are formally independent contractors rather than employees. When asked about their current employment status, 75.7% of platform workers reported being employed (68.1%) or self-employed (7.6%). The labour market status of platform workers is unclear even to workers themselves, and this uncertainty is reflected in policy and legal debates across Europe. While platform work can lower the entry barriers to the labour market and facilitate work participation through better matching procedures and easing the working conditions of specific groups, this type of work often relies on a workforce of independent contractors whose conditions of employment, representation, and social protection are unclear and often unfavourable.

In most EU states, the rules governing contributions and entitlements of social protection schemes are still largely based on full-time open-ended contracts between a worker and a single employer. As a result, workers with non-standard arrangements often do not have the same income and social security protections as workers with standard employer-employee contracts. Modern social protection systems should be adapted to a context of more irregular careers and frequent transitions, linking entitlements to individuals rather than jobs may contribute to this, while fostering mobility and mitigating the social cost of labour market adjustments.

==== United Kingdom ====
In some jurisdictions, legal rulings have classified full-time freelancers in the gig economy who work for a single main employer as workers and awarded them the rights and protections of regular workers. An example is the October 2016 ruling against Uber in Uber BV v Aslam, which supported the claim of two Uber drivers that they should be classified as workers and receive the associated worker rights and benefits.

In 2019, the UK Supreme Court provided guidance on how to categorize "gig economy" workers. The London-based company Pimlico Plumbers lost an appeal against the argument that one of its plumbers was a "worker", i.e., not an employee, but enjoying some "employment" rights such as holiday pay and sickness pay. The Employment Appeals Tribunal ruled that Hermes' couriers are "workers" with certain statutory benefits including minimum wage, rest periods and holiday pay. In 2018, Uber lost a court case which claimed drivers are workers and therefore entitled to workers' rights, including the national minimum wage and paid holiday. Another UK company involved in "worker status" legal cases is CitySprint. On 19 February 2021, the Supreme Court ruled in favour of 25 Uber drivers having "worker status"; the publication Personnel Today suggests that this case establishes "once and for all that in the UK the self-employed app-based driver model is no longer viable".

Many "gig economy workers" have not been able to receive COVID-19 pandemic support funding.

=== Latin America and Caribbean ===
==== Brazil ====
The precarity of work, with the growth of digital applications for the delivery of goods and services, a phenomenon popularly known as uberization, despite occurring in several countries around the world, has gained strength in Brazil, a country affected by deindustrialization and dependence on the service sector.

Despite promises from Brazilian government authorities to enact new laws to regulate the activity, the absence of specific regulations governing this new form of relationship between Brazilian companies and gig workers has increased legal uncertainty and has been a source of social conflict.

In 2020, there was a national strike bringing together delivery workers coordinated by a set of social movements, such as the Entregadores Antifascistas, a collective organisation of gig workers, which mobilized a set of actions and drew the attention of Brazilian society to the problem.

According to the IPEA, a government-led research agency, it was estimated that in October 2021, there were 1.4 million gig workers in Brazil.

=== United States ===
In 2015, nearly one in ten Americans (8%) earned money using digital platforms to take on a job or task. Meanwhile, nearly one in five Americans (18%) have earned money by selling something online, while 1% have rented out their properties on a home-sharing site. Adding up everyone who has performed at least one of these three activities, some 24% of American adults earned money in the "platform economy" in 2015.

In 2022, the U.S. Department of Labor released a proposal to revise the Department's guidance on determining whether someone is an employee or an independent contractor under the Fair Labor Standards Act (FLSA). The proposed rule would make it easier for gig workers/independent contractors to gain full employee status. Companies would be required to provide rights and benefits to gig workers/independent contractors equivalent to standard employees. These benefits include the minimum wage, health insurance, Social Security contributions, and unemployment insurance. The rule would replace a previous one enacted under the Trump administration that made it more difficult for a gig worker/independent contractor to be classified as an employee.

==== Age disparities ====
Eligible workers of all ages participate in the gig economy. The highest percentage of Americans who report having earned money at least once via gig work through an online platform is among those aged 18-29, at 30%. Participation drops to 18% for individuals between 30 and 49 years of age and is lower than for those 50 and older. The consulting firm McKinsey attributes the difference in participation by age in part to the low barrier of entry into gig work as young adults are still developing marketable skill sets for other lines of work.

The American Enterprise Institute (AEI) finds that, despite a general decline in gig workforce participation with age, approximately 20% of retired Americans participate in the gig economy, primarily by providing services such as tutoring, hosting rentals, caring for pets, and ride-hail driving. AEI states that the increase in gig work participation following retirement is due in part to fear of financial preparedness for retirement, given the increase in life expectancy or the effect of economic decline on the value of retirement accounts. However, AEI also cites boredom as a significant reason for participation, with 96% of gig workers over 65 reporting they feel more fulfilled when they maintain a job they enjoy.

==== Racial disparities ====
Gig work participation also varies by race in the United States. More non-white Americans report having earned money in the gig economy – 30% of Hispanic adults, 20% of Black adults, and 19% of Asian adults - than their white counterparts, at 12%. The differences in participation by race can be explained in part by individuals' migrant status, as globally, a disproportionate number of migrants report earning money through gig work. 58% of gig workers surveyed said the extra income earned as either "essential" or "important" as opposed to "nice to have". On Uber's Q2 2022 earnings call, 70% of new Uber drivers cited increased cost of living as the primary motivator to join the company.

In 2021, more non-white gig workers expressed concern about their exposure to COVID-19 on the job, at 50%, than their white counterparts, at 38%. A similar difference between races was found among standard workers with respect to their employer’s lack of COVID-19 precautions.

==== California ====
In 2019, the California legislature passed a law (AB 5) requiring all companies to re-classify their gig-workers from "independent contractors" to "employees". (In the US, there are two mutually exclusive employee classifications; the following ballot initiative created a third in California.) In response to AB 5, app-based ride-sharing and delivery companies Uber, Lyft, DoorDash, Instacart, and Postmates created a ballot initiative (2020 California Proposition 22), which won with 60% of the vote and exempted them from providing the full suite of mandated employee benefits (time-and-a-half for overtime, paid sick time, employer-provided health care, bargaining rights, and unemployment insurance - among others) while instead giving drivers new protections of:

- 120 percent of the local minimum wage for each hour a driver spends driving (with passenger or en route), but not time spent waiting
- $0.30/mile for expenses for each mile driven with a passenger or en route
- health insurance stipend for drivers who average more than 15 hours per week driving
- requires the companies to pay medical costs and some lost income for drivers hurt while driving or waiting
- prohibits workplace discrimination and requires that companies: develop sexual harassment policies, conduct criminal background checks, and mandate safety training for drivers

== See also ==
- False self-employment
- Freelancer
- Informal economy
- List of gig economy companies
- MTurkers
- Platform economy
- Precarious work
- Precariat
- Serfdom
- Lying flat
