= Drizzly =

Drizzly may refer to:

- Drizzle, a light rain
- A misspelling of Drizly, an alcohol delivery service merged into Uber Eats
