= Entregadores Antifascistas =

Brazilian activist movement

Antifascist Deliverers
- Entregadores Antifascistas
- Established: 2020; 6 years ago
- Type: Gig worker organization
- Location: Brazil
- Origins: COVID-19
- Fields: Food delivery
- Website: Instagram page

Entregadores Antifascistas (English: Antifascist Deliverers) is the name of a movement that has emerged in Brazil at the height of the COVID-19 pandemic in 2020. This movement has been focused on the public denunciation of labor conditions of food delivery workers in Brazil, under the gig economy.

== Background ==
It was estimated in 2019 that "4 million Brazilians 'employed' by companies such as Uber, iFood, 99 and Rappi, constituting some of the largest 'employers' in the country" During the pandemic, the demand for informal jobs has increased. In response to that precarity of labor, Paulo Roberto da Silva Lima (nicknamed Paulo Galo or Galo de Luta) started to denounce the conditions he faced, and consequently started a movement. This movement, the "Entregadores Antifascistas", gained most traction once it reached the internet and has " become one of the most significant striker movements of the year 2020 in Brazil." With its growing relevance, the movement has been widely covered by prominent media outlets in Brazil, such as Carta Capital, Folha de S. Paulo, The Intercept Brasil, R7 Globo, as well as generating high repercussion online, on social media.

According to R7, workers earn around R $2,000 or R $2,500 per month, provided they work around 8 to 12 hours a day, 26 days a month. Despite, 56,7% of them work more than 9 hours per day during the pandemic and 52% are currently working all 7 days of the week. From conducted interviews, 60% of workers claim they did not receive support to reduce the risk of contamination by COVID-19. Of the respondents, only 19.4% said they were provided with hand sanitizer by the companies.

== Strikes ==
The first national strike was held on 1 July, followed by another, on the 25th. The strike on 1 July encompassed about 8 thousand delivery workers. The aim of the strikes was to petition an increase and pay per km, the minimum amount per order and the end of unfair blockages. The protesters also press on the need for risk insurance such as health, accident and equipment, as well as assistance with protection from the Corona Virus.

== Paulo Galo ==
Universo Online (UOL) is a Brazilian web content company, which has actively provided coverage on the movement's development. On an article on early July, Paulo Galo's story is reported. His story begins on 21 March 2020. On that day, Galo was carrying out his job as a delivery worker, when the tire of his bike got flat. As he called the company Uber to explain he would not be able to complete the order, he was assured there were no problems. Nevertheless, on the next day, Galo found himself blocked from the app which provided him with his sole income. Paulo Galo then reports his instance on a video that went viral on Brazilian social networks. As a result, Galo created the movement "Entregadores Antifascistas". The delivery man also launched an online petition, which already has more than 380 thousand signatures.

As reported by Carta Capital in July 2020, Galo is a gig worker and he is the founder of the social movement that consists of 40 delivery men present in 11 different states. On that article, Galo claims "I created the whole thing, I was the first delivery man to show up, to hit. But the movement is made up of intellectual workers, there are several of them going to college for Architecture, Political Science, I didn't even finish high school"

When interviewed by Carta Capital, Paulo Galo claims the strike on July 1 leaves a positive mark on the fight. "It was the biggest one so far," although he understands that there is still a long way to go. In contrast, Galo also noted he has not yet noticed any practical results or change by the companies.

On 28 March 2021, Galo was detained by the police on Avenida Paulista, in the central region of São Paulo. As stated by the police report, Galo was arrested for contempt of authorities and then taken to the 078th Police District of Jardins. In the presence of lawyers, he was released around 12:15 pm (Brasília time). The arrest happened after a chase, which began in Pinheiros, in the west of the city, where the delivery man was reportedly insulted by a police vehicle and responded to the offenses, as he reported to the Alma Preta website.

== #BrequeDosApps ==
The movement #BrequeDosApps, was strongly supported by the "Entregadores Antifascistas". "In Portuguese, breque comes from the verb brecar, which means braking, making a vehicle stop through the brakes. In this sense, in wordplay, the movement proposes to stop sales by the app".

On Wednesday, 1 September 2020, hundreds of delivery workers have joined a strike by refusing to work. Among the main demands of #BrequeDosApps are the increase in the rate per kilometer traveled, the increase in the minimum value per delivery and the end of blockages without justification, in addition to the recent request for more protection and safety in the pandemic of the new coronavirus.

== See also ==
- False self-employment
- Gig worker
- Platform economy
- Precarity
- Precariat
