= Proposition 22 =

Proposition 22 may refer to:

- 2020 California Proposition 22, about app-based transportation
- 2000 California Proposition 22, about marriage
