= Ursula Huws =

Political economist

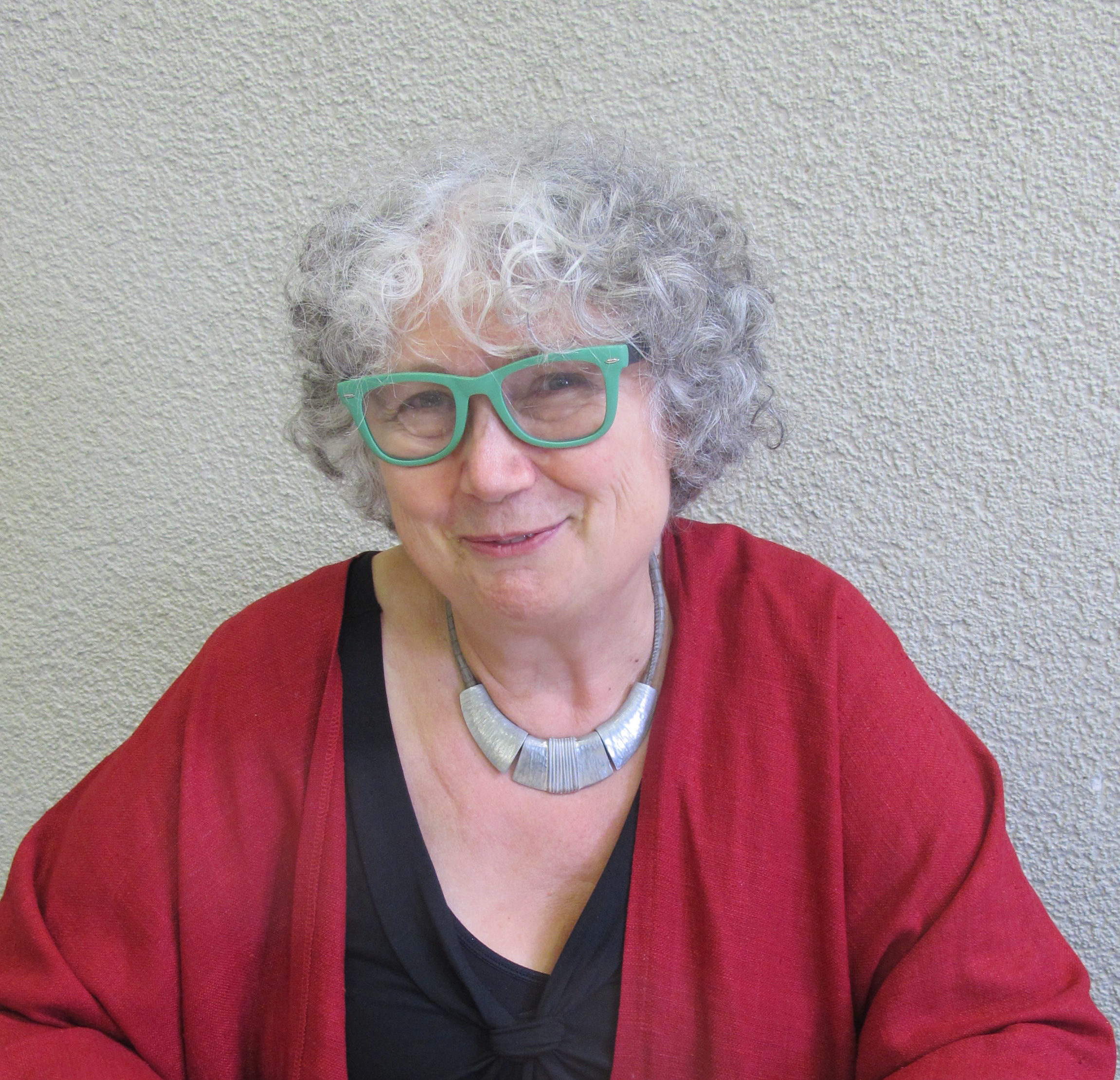
- Born: 1947 (age 78–79)
- Education: Courtauld Institute of Art; London Metropolitan University

Ursula E Huws (born 1947) is a Welsh political economist known for her work on teleworking.

== Early life and education ==
Huws attended Llanrwst Grammar School and Loreto College Llandudno in Wales and then completed her A Levels at the Oxford High School for Girls in 1965. Huws graduated in 1970 with a Bachelor of Arts (BA) in the History of European Art from the Courtauld Institute of Art. She later completed a PhD at London Metropolitan University in 2009.

== Career ==
In 1996, Huws started work at the Institute for Employment Studies. Huws has worked at the London Metropolitan University, and the University of Hertfordshire.

She is the editor of the journal Work Organisation, Labour and Globalisation, and co-edits the book series Dynamics of Virtual Work with Rosalind Gill.

== Research ==
Huws is known for her research on technological change and work. In the 1970s she began research on the impacts of computerisation on office work, including the health effects of working with video display terminals. In a 1981 study, The New Homeworkers, she examined how the combination of computing and telecommunications technologies would lead to new forms of teleworking. Her subsequent work has examined how advances in technology result in higher job losses for women, examined the exploitation of people working from home, and tracked the increased use of virtual assistants at work.

== Selected publications ==
- Huws, Ursula; Centre, Leeds Trade Union and Community Resource and Information (1982). Your Job in the 80s. London: Pluto Pr. ISBN 978-0-86104-365-1.
- Huws, Ursula. The new homeworkers : new technology and the changing location of white-collar work. OCLC 59028012.
- Huws, Ursula (2003). The Making of a Cybertariat. New York: Monthly Review Press. ISBN 978-1-58367-088-0.
- Huws, Ursula (2014). Labor in the Global Digital Economy: The Cybertariat Comes of Age.
- Huws, Ursula (2020). Reinventing the Welfare State: Digital Platforms and Public Policies.

== Honors and awards ==
Huws was elected a fellow of Academy of Social Sciences in 2004.
