= 2019 Lyft and Uber drivers' strikes =

Drivers strike

- Date: March 25, 2019 and May 8, 2019
- Location: United States ( Los Angeles; San Diego; San Francisco; Boston; Chicago; London; Minneapolis; Philadelphia; Stamford; Washington, D.C.)
- Caused by: Low pay, cut wages, no shareholding opportunities, no benefits
- Methods: Demonstrations, internet activism, walkout

Parties
| Blackcar Drivers United; Chicago Rideshare Advocates; Gig Workers Rising; Industrial Workers of the World; Philadelphia Drivers Union; Philadelphia Limousine Association; Rideshare Drivers United | Lyft; Uber |

A series of general strikes was coordinated on March 25, 2019 by Lyft and Uber drivers in Los Angeles, San Diego and San Francisco, California, United States led by rideshare advocate group Rideshare Drivers United. The strikes aimed to protest low wages, long hours, working conditions, and lack of benefits. The event was planned following Lyft's initial public offering. A second strike took place on May 8, 2019 in anticipation of Uber's initial public offering. The strike in response to Uber's IPO took place in 25 major cities across the United States, and were also joined by drivers in other locations worldwide where Uber operates.

== Background ==
Both Lyft and Uber are ridesharing companies. Drivers serve as independent contractors to Uber and Lyft and provide rides to individuals, similar to taxicab companies. Users are able to request or drive for both companies by downloading a smartphone app. Drivers are required to undergo an initial background check and vehicle inspection to make sure they are properly licensed and have a vehicle that is adequate for the company's standards. Drivers then link to a banking account so that Uber and Lyft can pay drivers for their service. A certain proportion of the rider’s fare goes to the company for administrative support while another goes to the driver for providing the trip.

In addition, both companies offer various transportation services beyond peer-to-peer ridesharing. Uber offers food delivery service via Uber Eats, and in select cities, Lyft offers scooter sharing (similar to Lime and Bird).

Both companies, while having multi-billion dollar investments have alleged to be perpetually losing money, with the goal of investors not to make money, but to capture the market share of transportation services, particularly as a replacement to personal automobile use and mass transportation use. The launch of Lyft's initial public offering (IPO) and drivers' pay cuts in Early 2019 led to the first strikes occurring in Los Angeles, San Diego and San Francisco.

The planned strikes came in response to Lyft's decision to go public as a for-profit corporation, while Uber followed suit later that year. The rationale is that most, if not all of Uber and Lyft's profits are income derived from drivers who work for low wages, no benefits, and who are misclassified workers, rather than earned by executives who manage infrastructure.

== Strikes ==
The first major 24-hour strike was held simultaneously, in Los Angeles, San Diego and San Francisco on March 25, 2019, the day Lyft went public and following a pay-cut announcement from Uber. This prompted both companies to announced financial allocations for driver bonuses, which the California based Rideshare Drivers United union says is inadequate, and still only amounts to a pay of $8.55 per hour. As of mid 2019, all bonuses offered were removed from drivers pay incentives, including the drivers share of Ubers’s “surge”, or Lyft’s “prime” pricing for passengers during busy commute times. The companies still charge riders the higher fares, but have stopped sharing those profits with drivers.

After drivers’ earlier strike against Lyft, a second 24 hour strike was planned on May 8, 2019. This strike included not just California drivers, but drivers from 25 major cities across the US, and was also joined by several other international locations where Uber operates, inciting a highly publicized worldwide strike against Uber Technologies, Inc. The May 8 date was chosen as it coincides with Uber's IPO, which was estimated to raise the company $9 billion. In addition to Los Angeles, San Diego and San Francisco, drivers went on strike in Chicago, Boston, Minneapolis, Philadelphia, and Washington, D.C., and were also joined by drivers from several international locations where Uber operates.

== Demands ==
In California, Uber and Lyft drivers demanded that the companies pay their drivers a base minimum wage of $27.86 an hour, so that pay after expenses, such as gas and toll roads, would be at least $17.22, allowing drivers to keep up with the rising cost of living in their cities. Further demands include overtime pay, sick pay, accrued paid time off and paid family leave, a voice on the job through a driver-led union, safety measures to be implemented protecting both driver and passenger safety, and healthcare benefits.
