= Rideshare Drivers United (California) =

Independent driver association

Rideshare Drivers United is an organization of platform drivers that advocates for the interests of rideshare drivers in California.

The group has its origins in the 2017 strikes by rideshare drivers at Los Angeles' LAX airport. It was also active in the 2019 Lyft and Uber drivers' strikes, and worked to oppose the 2020 California Proposition 22, which passed with more than 58% of the vote.
