= Drizly =

Former alcohol delivery platform

- Type: Subsidiary
- Industry: Retail
- Founded: 2012; 14 years ago
- Founder: Justin Robinson; Spencer Frazier; Nick Rellas
- Defunct: 2024; 2 years ago
- Headquarters: Boston, Massachusetts, United States
- Key people: Cory Rellas (CEO)
- Services: Alcohol delivery
- Parent: Uber
- Website: www.drizly.com

Drizly was an online ordering and delivery platform that facilitated the delivery of alcohol from local retailers via its mobile app or website. During 2020, the company had approximately 4,000 retail partners.

== History ==
Drizly was founded by Nick Rellas, Justin Robinson, and Spencer Frazier in 2012. The company launched its service in Boston in 2013 and then expanded to New York, Los Angeles, and Chicago.

In 2015, the company raised $13 million Series A round from Polaris Partners, Suffolk Equity Partners, Cava Capital, Fairhaven Capital Partners, and First Beverage Group.

In February 2016, Drizly expanded to Edmonton and Calgary, Alberta, Canada, through a partnership with Liquor Stores N.A. (LSNA).

In August 2016, the company raised a $15 million Series B round.

In July 2018, Drizly partnered with Anheuser-Busch to keep beer stocked in offices using Anheuser-Busch's Office Bud-e fridges, which use technology to automatically re-order beer when stocks run low.

In September 2021, the company added a service that delivers alcohol to weddings.

In October 2021, Uber acquired the company for $1.1 billion in cash and stock.

In January 2024, Uber announced that Drizly would be shutting down and would be merged with the Uber Eats app by March 2024. Uber also announced it would be shutting down its grocery shopping app Cornershop.

== Data breach ==
On July 28, 2020, Drizly announced it was the victim of a data breach that exposed the contact information of approximately 2.5 million customers. This resulted in a class action lawsuit that was settled in 2021, with each affected member receiving approximately $14.
