= California Assembly Bill 5 (2019) =

California labor statute

California State Legislature
- Full name: An act to amend Section 3351 of, and to add Section 2750.3 to, the Labor Code, and to amend Sections 606.5 and 621 of the Unemployment Insurance Code, relating to employment, and making an appropriation therefor
- Introduced: 2018-12-03
- Assembly voted: 2019-09-11 (56–15)
- Senate voted: 2019-09-10 (29–11)
- Signed into law: 2019-09-18
- Governor: Governor Gavin Newsom
- Code: Labor Code and Unemployment Insurance Code
- Section: 3351, 2750.3, 606.5, 621
- Resolution: AB 5
- Website: Full text of the bill

Status: Current legislation

California Assembly Bill 5 or AB 5 is a state statute that expands a landmark Supreme Court of California case from 2018, Dynamex Operations West, Inc. v. Superior Court ("Dynamex"). In that case, the court held that most wage-earning workers are employees and ought to be classified as such, and that the burden of proof for classifying individuals as independent contractors belongs to the hiring entity. AB 5 extends that decision to all workers. It entitles them to be classified as employees with the usual labor protections, such as minimum wage laws, sick leave, and unemployment and workers' compensation benefits, which do not apply to independent contractors. Concerns over employee misclassification, especially in the gig economy, drove support for the bill, but it remains divisive.

The law codifies and expands the scope of the so-called "ABC test", established in the Dynamex ruling. That test states that a worker must be classified as an employee, and not a contractor, unless the employment meets all of the following conditions: (A) the individual operates free from the company's direction and control, both in the contract and in reality; (B) the service is performed outside the usual course of business of the employer; and (C) the individual is customarily engaged in an independently established trade, occupation, profession, or business of the same nature as that involved in the service performed.

In response to the passage of AB 5, many industries began to lobby for exemptions. Approximately 100 professions were specifically exempted from AB5; generally these professions are seen to work directly with and set their own prices to customers.

The ridesharing companies Uber and Lyft both lobbied heavily against passage of the bill, and after it was passed they lobbied unsuccessfully to get the California legislature to exempt ridesharing from the bill. They (along with food delivery company DoorDash) also refused, after the bill's passage, to reclassify their drivers as employees. The three companies, now also joined by Instacart and Postmates, funded a ballot initiative, Proposition 22, to exempt both ridesharing and delivery companies from the AB 5 requirements, while also giving drivers some new protections, including minimum wage and per-mile expense reimbursement. Proposition 22 passed in November 2020 with 59% of the vote.

== Provisions and history ==
On April 30, 2018, the Supreme Court of California ruled in Dynamex to impose strict requirements for employee classification. It created a 3-part test to determine whether an employee could be classified as a contractor rather than an employee, commonly known as the "ABC" test, replacing, for wage order claims, a previous 11-point standard set in an earlier case, S.G. Borello & Sons, Inc. v. Department of Industrial Relations ("Borello") in 1989 (the Borello test).

AB 5, introduced in December 2018, places the expansion of the Dynamex ruling on a statutory footing by inserting §2750.3 to the California Labor Code, and, as a general rule, puts the burden of proof on employers to show that a worker is properly classified as an independent contractor where all three of the following conditions are met:

- the worker is free from the control and direction of the employer in connection with the performance of the work, both under the contract for the performance of such work and in fact
- the worker performs work that is outside the usual course of the hiring entity's business
- the worker is customarily engaged in an independently established trade, occupation, or business of the same nature as the work performed for the hiring entity

This test is excluded in certain specified cases, where Borello will continue to apply. This is declared without qualification for a specified list of occupations, For other stated professional, B2B and construction services, separate lists of conditions must also be fully applicable in order to establish that a worker is an independent contractor. Real estate licensees and repossession agencies were declared to be governed by the California Business and Professions Code instead.

The proposed law also gives cities in the state the right to sue companies for violating the law, where previously they could not. The California Attorney General's office and local prosecutors can also sue companies.

Proponents of the bill said it would give workers previously classified as contractors minimum wage, overtime, sick leave, unemployment and other benefits, and prevent the state from losing $8 billion from unpaid payroll taxes. Opponents said it would increase labor costs by up to 30%, create higher costs and reduced service for customers and reduce flexibility for workers.

After discussions and amendments to the law, which primarily included exceptions for certain professions, the bill first passed the Assembly in May 2019. In August 2019, as the bill neared passage, gig economy companies Uber and Lyft also proposed a negotiated $21 minimum wage but to keep employees as independent contractors as an exception. The proposals were not accepted by the legislature. Other amendments and exceptions were made, primarily to exclude particular professions. The bill drew national attention, including the support of major Democratic Party 2020 presidential candidates.

After its final passage in the legislature, on September 11, 2019, Uber and Lyft both said they had no plans to reclassify workers as employees, with Uber's Chief Legal Officer Tony West saying "Just because the test is hard doesn't mean we won't be able to pass it. We continue to believe that drivers are properly classified as independent."

In response to the implementation of the law, the United States Court of Appeals for the Ninth Circuit reinstated its decision in Vazquez v. Jan-Pro, which impacts California franchise law and California independent contractor law, by making it unclear that if a franchisor licenses its trademark to a franchisee the franchisor incurs the liabilities of an employer.

On December 16, 2019, California Labor and Workforce Development Agency developed guidance to provide resources and information to workers and employers on AB 5.

AB 5 was introduced by California assemblywoman Lorena Gonzalez and endorsed by Governor Gavin Newsom. It was approved by the California State Senate 29–11 on a party-line vote, by the Assembly 56–15, and signed by Governor Gavin Newsom on September 18, 2019. It took effect January 1, 2020.

== Exemptions ==
Approximately 100 professions were specifically exempted from AB5, including doctors, dentists, psychologists, insurance agents, stockbrokers, lawyers, accountants, engineers, real estate agents, travel agents, graphic designers, songwriters, architects, youth sports coaches, and some freelance writers, producers, and cartographers, as they are generally seen to work directly with and set their prices to customers.

Others are exempt with conditions, such as hairstylists, barbers, cosmetologists, and estheticians if they set their own pay rates, are paid directly by customers, and schedule appointments themselves. Salespeople are exempt if they are paid based on actual sales. Commercial fishermen are exempt except from unemployment insurance.

Newspaper companies will be given an extra year before having to reclassify their delivery workers, as the extra costs may be an overwhelming burden for some news organizations currently in a precarious financial state.

In response to the passage of AB 5, several industries began to lobby Sacramento for exemptions. The industries that were granted exemptions tended to have the following characteristics:

- the independent contractors had the wherewithal to set or negotiate their own prices
- the independent contractors had access to direct communication with customers
- the independent contractors earned at least twice the minimum wage

== Legal challenges ==
In November 2019, the California Trucking Association, representing about 70,000 truck drivers in the state, filed suit in the United States District Court for the Southern District of California, challenging both the California Supreme Court Dynamex ruling and AB 5. The Association argued that many of the represented drivers had opted to be independent contractors after having been employed drivers, as this allowed them to set their own schedules and otherwise profit from owning their own vehicle. Enforcement of AB 5 would force them to be treated as employees and lose these benefits, the Association argued. In April 2021 the Ninth Circuit Court of Appeals ruled against an exemption being applied in California for truck drivers, and in July 2022 the U.S. Supreme Court declined to hear the Association's petition against the law, leaving the Appeal Court decision in place.

On December 17, 2019, the American Society of Journalists and Authors and the National Press Photographers Association filed suit in United States District Court for the Central District of California, Western Division claiming the law unconstitutionally singled out freelance journalists by limiting the amount of work they can produce for any single publisher, unlike any other job category listed as "professional services".

Uber and Postmates filed a similar suit at the end of December 2019, challenging that the law denies equal protection due to variance in the types of jobs exempted.

== Reception and impact ==
Organizers expected AB 5 to lead to the growth of labor unions.

=== Music industry ===
The Recording Academy expressed concerns that AB 5 would negatively impact gigging musicians, and stated that it is lobbying California lawmakers to inform them about "the impact of such legislation".

Director of San Jose Jazz Brendan Rawson argued that because AB 5 requires any music venue to designate members of an act performing there even once as official employees of the venue itself, events such as music festivals would be severely and unnecessarily burdened. The only way around this, Rawson said, is for musicians to incorporate themselves. Rawson pointed out that this extended beyond the musicians themselves, citing temporary hiring of SJPD officers for the San Jose Jazz's Summer Fest, all of whom would be added as San Jose Jazz employees.

In February 2020, The Lake Tahoe Music Festival announced that it was shutting down after 40 years due to AB 5 and COVID-19.

In April 2020, the San Francisco Chronicle wrote, "Tens of thousands of musicians had said AB5, which took effect Jan. 1, would ruin their livelihoods by forcing them to become employees or employers every time they played a one-night show at a coffee house, or used a backup vocalist, for instance."

=== Freelance writers ===
Forbes criticized the bill's limits on freelance journalism and is advocating for California to change it. Assemblywoman Gonzalez acknowledged that some freelance journalists lost substantial income. Several days prior, in response to potential job losses resulting from the bill, Gonzalez tweeted, "These were never good jobs. No one has ever suggested that, even freelancers. We will continue to work on this next year."

In December 2019, Vox Media ended contracts with about 200 freelance sports writers and editors who wrote for the blog network SB Nation, and announced it would replace them with 20 new part-time and full-time employees. Prior to these layoffs, Vox had published opinion pieces in support of AB 5. Assemblywoman Gonzalez criticized Vox, referring to them as "vultures" in connection with their previous use of freelance writers.

Freelance journalists who live in California fear that it will be harder to get work, because companies will not want to deal with the additional paperwork and legal liabilities of AB 5 and will instead hire someone from another state.

In December 2019, CNN reported that AB 5 "prevents freelancers writers, editors and photographers from contributing more than 35 'content submissions' to a media organization per year."

=== Ride-hailing service drivers ===
In response to the new law, Uber has made several changes to its app for drivers in California, such as allowing drivers to see destinations in advance, and removing penalties for rejecting rides. It has also started testing a new feature that allows drivers to set their own rates, in 10% increments, with the passenger seeing the lowest fare accepted by an available driver, and drivers seeing how long they will likely wait to get dispatched based on their chosen rate.

== Enforcement actions ==
In May 2020, California Attorney General Xavier Becerra sued Uber and Lyft, alleging the ride-hailing companies had misclassified their drivers as "independent contractors" rather than "employees" in violation of AB5. The suit alleged that Uber and Lyft denied their workers mandated "employee" benefits and protections such as minimum wage and overtime pay, reimbursement for business-related expenses, unemployment and disability insurance, and paid sick leave.

California Superior Court Judge Ethan Schulman issued his ruling on August 10, 2020, stating that Uber and Lyft must treat their drivers as employees under AB-5, as their work in the context of the "ABC test" was not outside the usual course of their business, nor was a "multi-sided platform" as Uber and Lyft had argued but simply transportation companies that fell within AB-5's provisions. Both Uber and Lyft have stated their plans to appeal the ruling as well as seek an injunction to stay the order until the appeal is complete.

=== Trucking ===
Los Angeles City Attorney Mike Feuer sued several trucking companies, alleging that they were violating AB5 by classifying their drivers as "independent contractors" rather than "employees", but Superior Court judge William Highberger decided that AB5 is pre-empted by the Federal Aviation Administration Authorization Act of 1994.
