= Indian Federation of App-based Transport Workers =

Trade union federation of app-based transport workers in India

Indian Federation Of App-Based Transport Workers
- Founded: 19 December 2019
- Headquarters: Mumbai
- Location: India
- Members: 1.56 lacs above (claimed)
- President: Prashant Bhagesh Sawardekar
- Secretary: Udaykumar Ambonkar
- Website: www.ifat.org.in

The Indian Federation of App-based Transport Workers (IFAT) (Hindi: इंडियन फेडरेशन ऑफ ऐप-आधारित ट्रांसपोर्ट वर्कर्स, Indiyan phedareshan oph aip-aadhaarit traansaport varkars) is a trade union federation of ride-sharing transport workers founded in December 2019. In India, this includes the workers on platforms such as Ola and Uber.

Prashant Bhagesh Sawardekar is the founder of IFAT and as of 2025 serves as its national president.

Udaykumar Ambonkar holds the position of National General Secretary of IFAT Founder and secretary of Maharashtra App-Based Transport Workers Union, since 2023. Ambonkar has a background in organising Gig and Platform Workers, and has negotiated wage settlements and represented workers in various legal forums national and international.

== History ==
IFAT was founded on 19 December 2019 at a conference in Mumbai. Demands at its founding conference included a minimum price per kilometer, a welfare board for drivers and government insurance.

During the COVID-19 pandemic, IFAT demanded that companies should provide their workers with personal protective equipment and called on the government to provide insurance to gig transport workers. According to the union, over 38,000 workers took part in nationwide protests for these demands in June 2020. The union also criticized the decision by companies to make downloading the Aarogya Setu contact tracing app mandatory for drivers, saying that it would allow the companies to track their workers. In September of that year, IFAT workers with Swiggy went on strike to demand the restoration of an old payment structure in which they received more money for deliveries between three and six kilometers.

In February 2021, IFAT workers went on strike in Telangana Hyderabad, Maharashtra, Karnataka, Rajasthan, Delhi, Hydrabad, Assam, Kochi, Kolkata, Lucknow, Gujrat, Chennai, and Odisha, demanding an increase in fares to compensate for rising fuel prices.

In September 2021, IFAT filed a public interest litigation in the Supreme Court, with regards to the employee classification, specifically inclusion in the Unorganised Workers' Social Security Act 2008.
