= 2020 California Proposition 22 =

Gig economy workers employment status ballot initiative

Proposition 22
- November 3, 2020
- Exempts App-Based Transportation and Delivery Companies from Providing Employee Benefits to Certain Drivers

Results
Choice	Votes	%
Yes	9,957,858	58.63%
No	7,027,467	41.37%
Valid votes	16,985,325	95.50%
Invalid or blank votes	799,826	4.50%
Total votes	17,785,151	100.00%
Registered voters/turnout	22,047,448	80.67%

For
70%–80%
60%–70%
50%–60%
Against
60%–70%
50%–60%

Proposition 22 was a ballot initiative in California that became law after the November 2020 state election, passing with 59% of the vote and granting app-based transportation and delivery companies an exception to Assembly Bill 5 by classifying their drivers as "independent contractors", rather than "employees". The law exempts employers from providing the full suite of mandated employee benefits (which include time-and-a-half for overtime, paid sick time, employer-provided health care, bargaining rights, and unemployment insurance) while instead giving drivers new protections:

- 120 percent of the local minimum wage for each hour a driver spends driving (with passenger or en route), but not for time spent waiting
- $0.30/mile for expenses for each mile driven with passenger or en route
- health insurance stipend for drivers who average more than 15 hours per week driving
- requiring the companies to pay medical costs and some lost income for drivers hurt while driving or waiting
- prohibiting workplace discrimination and requiring that companies develop sexual harassment policies, conduct criminal background checks, and mandate safety training for drivers.

The initiative became state law after passed in November 2020, was challenged in California state courts in 2021, and was upheld on appeal in 2023 and by the California Supreme Court in 2024.

== Background ==
In 2019, Assembly Bill 5 was passed, and it was designed by lawmakers to require companies to classify ride-hail drivers and other gig-economy workers as "employees". It requires companies to classify all workers as employees unless companies can prove that the workers: are not directed or controlled by the company during their work time, and their work is not the company's "core" business, and the worker has their own business doing that type of work. Lyft and Uber refused to comply with this law, and stated a desire to keep drivers classified as independent contractors.

In August 2020, the California court ordered Uber and Lyft to comply with the law within a 10-day deadline. The companies said they would shut down their operation in California if drivers had to become employees. On August 20, the deadline day, the companies asked for an extension. The court granted an extension until November 4, 2020, on the condition that Uber and Lyft CEOs provide a sworn testimony by October 4 confirming their plan to comply with AB 5. The companies indicated they would no longer shut down. The ride-hail companies, joined by DoorDash and Instacart, supported Proposition 22 for the November 3, 2020, ballot election, which was held one day prior to the extended AB 5 deadline on November 4.

In an opinion piece in The New York Times, Uber's CEO Dara Khosrowshahi advocated for the legal creation of a third employment classification between the current mutually exclusive classes of "employee" and "independent contractor", claiming it was necessary to allow gig workers to have the flexibility and freedom to fit work into their schedules, while also allowing companies to provide some benefits for them without being forced into the full requirements associated with "employee" classification. According to Khosrowshahi, the employee classification does not allow schedules chosen by the employee, or under 40 hour schedules like the "independent contractor" classification does. He also called for benefits funds, which would pay workers extra cash for each hour worked, that they could use for the benefits they want, (like health insurance or paid time off), while allowing them to work for multiple different companies, all of which would give them cash for this benefit fund based on the hours worked for each company.

=== Driver earnings ===
In July 2020, before Prop 22 passed, the California Legislative Analyst's Office stated in an analysis of the Proposition: "Most drivers work part time and many drivers only work for a short time or only drive occasionally." and "Most drivers probably make between $11 and $16 per hour, after accounting for waiting time and driving expenses."

== Projected effects ==
=== Number of drivers ===
Uber said that 90% of their 1.2 million drivers nationwide work less than 40 hours per week, with 80% working less than 20 hours per week, and that if they were required to classify drivers as employees, they would terminate 80% of their drivers because their nationwide business can only support 250,000 full-time jobs.

=== Fares ===
A study released by Uber found that if rideshare companies were required to comply with AB5, it would increase fares to rideshare consumers by 25-100%, depending on the market.

== Reception ==
=== Support ===
Lyft, Uber, DoorDash, Instacart, and Postmates contributed over $205 million into campaigns supporting Prop 22, making it the most expensive ballot measure in California's history. This included major funding for the Yes on Prop 22 campaign, and promoting the proposed legislation directly to customers when using their app. Beyond in-app messaging, this investment manifested itself in billboards, digital, print, and radio ads, as well as dozens of lobbyists and voter mailers. Several critiques have been made claiming that these initiatives carried messages that were misleading to persuade voters, with many advertisements informing voters that a "no" outcome for the proposition would put drivers' occupations in jeopardy, among other messages.

Some gig companies also encouraged their workers to support and promote the legislation: Uber sent its drivers in-app messages forcing them to click on either "Yes on Prop 22" or "OK", Instacart requested shoppers place pro-Prop 22 stickers in customers' shopping bags, and DoorDash distributed "Yes on 22" delivery bags to merchants, which were picked up by drivers.

==== Title litigation ====
The ballot title, written by Attorney General Xavier Becerra, is "Exempts App-Based Transportation and Delivery Companies from Providing Employee Benefits to Certain Drivers. Initiative Statute". The Yes on Prop 22 campaign challenged this description as non-neutral in court, but their arguments were rejected by a Sacramento Superior Court judge.

=== Opposition ===
The No on Prop 22 campaign was funded by the California Labor Federation, with support from UC Berkeley Labor Center. The campaign received around $19 million in support, mostly from labor groups. Driver groups Rideshare Drivers United, Gig Workers Rising, We Drive Progress, and Mobile Workers United, spoke out against Prop 22. Editorial boards from The New York Times and Los Angeles Times also called on voters to reject Prop 22.

The proposition would add protections specific to app-based workers, different from other independent contractors, but these protections would only apply during the time the worker is "engaged" in fulfilling a specific request and not while the worker is logged in to the app and available to fulfill a request.

== Polls ==
Poll source	Date(s) administered	Sample size (Note: Key: A – all adults RV – registered voters LV – likely voters)	Margin of error	For Proposition 22	Against Proposition 22	Undecided
Redfield & Wilton Strategies	October 27–30, 2020	5,000 (RV)	± 1.39%	62%	28%	9%
UC Berkeley Institute of Governmental Studies	October 16–21, 2020	5,352 (LV)	± 2%	46%	42%	12%
Ipsos/Spectrum News	October 7–15, 2020	1,400 (A)	± 3%	62%	23%	15%
SurveyUSA	September 26–28, 2020	588 (LV)	± 5.4%	45%	31%	25%
Redfield & Wilton Strategies	September 19–21, 2020	1,915 (LV)	± 2.19%	53%	27%	20%
UC Berkeley/Los Angeles Times	September 9–15, 2020	5,900 (LV)	± 2%	39%	36%	25%
Redfield & Wilton Strategies	August 9, 2020	2,000 (RV)	± 2.19%	41%	26%	34%

== Results ==
Proposition 22
Choice	Votes	%
For	9,958,425	58.63
Against	7,027,820	41.37
Total	16,986,245	100.00
Registered voters/turnout	22,047,448	80.67

Proposition 22 results (excluding invalid votes)
Yes; 9,958,425 (58.6%)	No; 7,027,820 (41.4%)
▲50%

== Ability to amend ==
All laws created in California by ballot measure are protected from being changed by the state legislature; they can only be changed by another ballot measure. Many ballot initiatives waive this protection, and explicitly state a percentage majority by which they allow the legislature to change the law; commonly, a 2/3 majority is specified. Prop 22 instead designated a 7/8 majority as being required to change it, although this provision as would have applied to collective bargaining was removed by an appeals court ruling in March 2023.

== Post passage ==
=== Wage effects ===
A highly contentious literature exists on the topic, with estimates for earnings after Prop-22 (in 2021) ranging from $34.46 per hour to $6.20 per hour.

The $34.46 figure comes from a UCR School of Business Center for Economic Forecasting and Development study paid for by the app companies (Protect App-Based Drivers + Services Coalition - DoorDash, Instacart, Lyft, and Uber) who also supplied one year's worth of their data covering fourth quarter 2020 to third quarter 2021. This included 1.37 million drivers who performed at least one ride or delivery during the period, totalling $4.3 billion in driver earnings. The $34.46 per hour number includes tips, but only covers "engaged" time, (time spent driving to a pickup or time driving with a customer/delivery, but not time spent waiting) and did not deduct automobile expenses. It varies by region, with large coastal cities providing higher earnings for drivers than rural regions, with (including tips) San Francisco drivers making $39.83/hr, and Bakersfield drivers making $30.22/hr.

The $6.20 per hour figure comes from a study paid for by union groups opposed to the proposition (Rideshare Drivers United) which used data from 21 drivers who voluntarily used a special app to collect their data, yielding information on 3,020 trips between November and December 2021. They found $26.30 per hour in gross earnings before deducting automobile expenses and the costs of employee benefits which workers would receive if they were employees, which reduced their calculated effective net pay to $6.20 per hour.

=== Driver flexibility ===
Proposition 22 has allowed drivers to continue to have flexibile schedules as independent contractors.

=== Driver benefits ===
As Uber indicates on their website, the driver must be the primary policyholder order to qualify for the healthcare stipend. It specified that those who have Medicare and Medicaid plans or other insurance paid by employers are not eligible for this benefit. Some have argued that since only "active time" is counted toward the 15 hours / week minimum, with time on different platforms being counted separately, drivers are less likely to be eligible for these benefits. According to polling conducted by Tulchin Research, 86% of surveyed drivers are ineligible for Prop 22 Healthcare Stipend and those eligible are largely unaware of how to do sign up, receiving little information from app-based companies.

=== Litigation ===
A lawsuit was filed against the state in January 2021 by the Service Employees International Union over the successful passage of Proposition 22. The lawsuit states that Proposition 22 violates the Constitution of California, as it interferes with workers' access to the state's workers' compensation program and that it "limits the power of elected officials to govern".

On August 20, 2021, Alameda County Superior Court Judge Frank Roesch ruled Proposition 22 unconstitutional because it was not limited to a single subject and because it included a seven-eighths requirement for the legislature to be able to change the initiative which infringed on the legislature's power to set workplace standards. He thereby ruled the entire ballot measure unenforceable. However, the initiative will stay in force while interest groups representing mobile application-based service platforms appeal the ruling.

On March 13, 2023, a three judge panel of the California Courts of Appeal (First Appellate District) reversed the lower district court's judgement of 2021, finding that of the three arguments presented, none of them violated the California Constitution. The court stated that Proposition 22 did not violate the Legislature's ability to enact laws (in combination with a voter initiative), did not violate the requirement that an initiative cover "a single subject", and did not violate the Constitutional separation of powers. The court did sever the proposition's requirement that a seven-eights majority of the legislature was necessary to make changes to worker's options for collective bargaining.

In June 2023, the California Supreme Court agreed to hear an appeal to Proposition 22 and determine its constitutionality under the California constitution. In July 2024, the court unanimously upheld the proposition, saying that the state's constitution does not prevent voters from passing initiatives relating to workers' compensation.

== Impact outside California ==
Proposition 22 passing has led rideshare companies to pursue legislation and ballot measures about classifying drivers in other states. Rideshare companies have also increased lobbying efforts in Washington, DC to keep drivers as independent contractors at the federal level.

=== Massachusetts ===
In Massachusetts, Uber and Lyft led a bid to introduce a ballot measure that would maintain their drivers' status as independent contractors. The initiative was blocked from reaching the ballot by the state's Supreme Judicial Court in June 2022, which ruled that a provision in the measure which appeared to shield the companies from legal liability for accidents or crime was a "substantively distinct policy decision", while the state's constitution requires all parts of a ballot measure be related.

=== Washington ===
In April 2022, Washington state legislators passed, and the governor signed a bill specifying that ride-share drivers are independent contractors, while also giving them new protections and benefits. The law requires that drivers receive a minimum amount per mile ($1.17), per minute ($0.34), and per ride ($3), as well as giving them one hour of paid sick leave per 40 hours worked. It also created a way for drivers to dispute "deactivations", (essentially terminations or firings) which are when the app company stops allowing them to find passengers through the app.
