= Uber =

American ridesharing and delivery company

Uber Technologies, Inc.

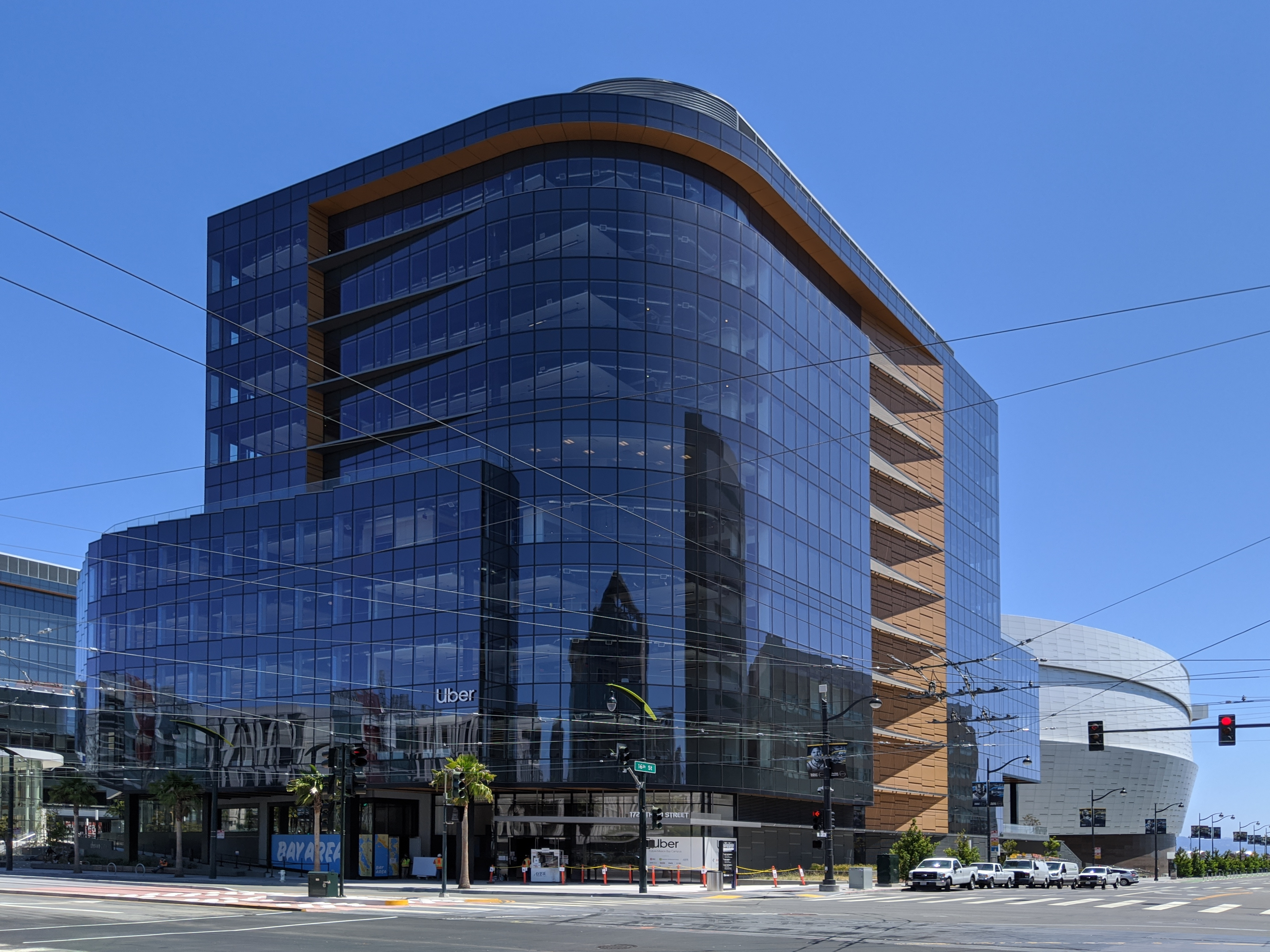
- Headquarters in Mission Bay, San Francisco
- Formerly: Ubercab (2009–2011)
- Type: Public
- Traded as: NYSE: UBER; DJTA component; S&P 100 component; S&P 500 component
- Industry: Transportation; Mobility as a service
- Founded: March 2009; 17 years ago
- Founders: Garrett Camp; Travis Kalanick
- Headquarters: 1725 3rd St.; San Francisco, California, United States
- Area served: 70 countries and 10,500 cities worldwide
- Key people: Ronald Sugar (chairman); Dara Khosrowshahi (CEO)
- Services: Taxi; Food delivery; Package delivery; Freight transport
- Revenue: ▲US$52.017 billion (2025)
- Operating income: ▲US$5.565 billion (2025)
- Net income: ▲US$10.053 billion (2025)
- Total assets: ▲US$61.802 billion (2025)
- Total equity: ▲US$27.041 billion (2025)
- Number of employees: 34,000 (2025)
- Subsidiaries: Careem (2020–2023); Cornershop; Drizly (2021–2024); Postmates; Uber Carshare (2022–2024); Uber Eats; Uber Freight
- Website: uber.com

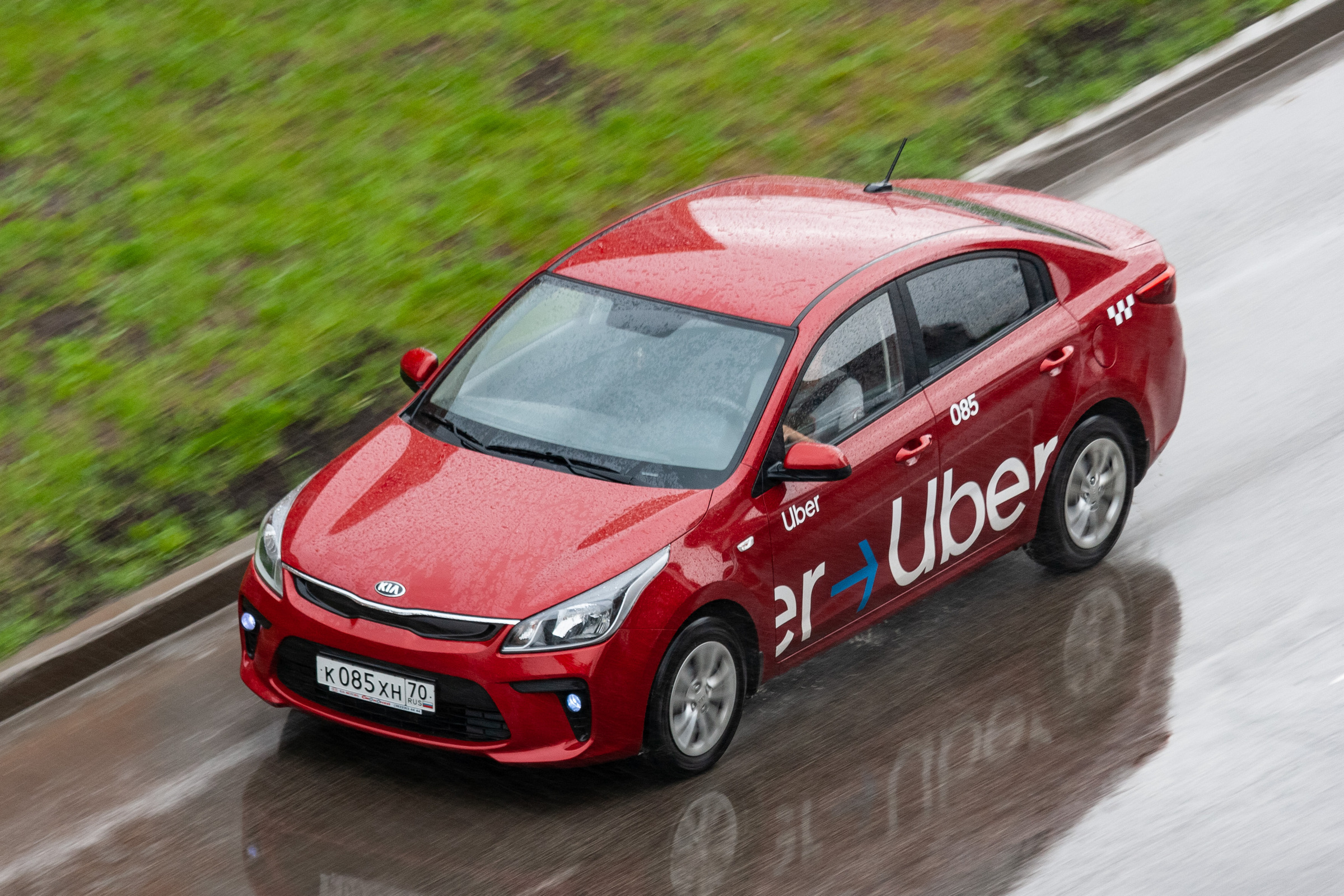
Uber taxi

Uber Technologies, Inc. is an American multinational transportation company that provides ride-hailing services, courier services, food delivery, and freight transport. It is headquartered in San Francisco, California, and operates in approximately 70 countries and 15,000 cities worldwide. It is the largest ridesharing company worldwide with over 202 million monthly active users and 10 million active drivers and couriers. It coordinates an average of 42 million trips and delivery orders per day, and has coordinated 72 billion trips and delivery orders since its inception in 2010. In the fourth quarter of 2025, the company had a take rate (revenue as a percentage of gross bookings) of 29.9% for mobility services and 19.2% for food delivery.

The company has launched or is in the process of launching robotaxi services in several cities worldwide in partnership with operators, software designers, and car manufacturers including Lucid Motors, Nuro, Baidu, Pony.ai, Avride, Nissan, Rivian, Zoox, Stellantis, Wayve, and Nvidia (to use the Nvidia Drive software).

== History ==
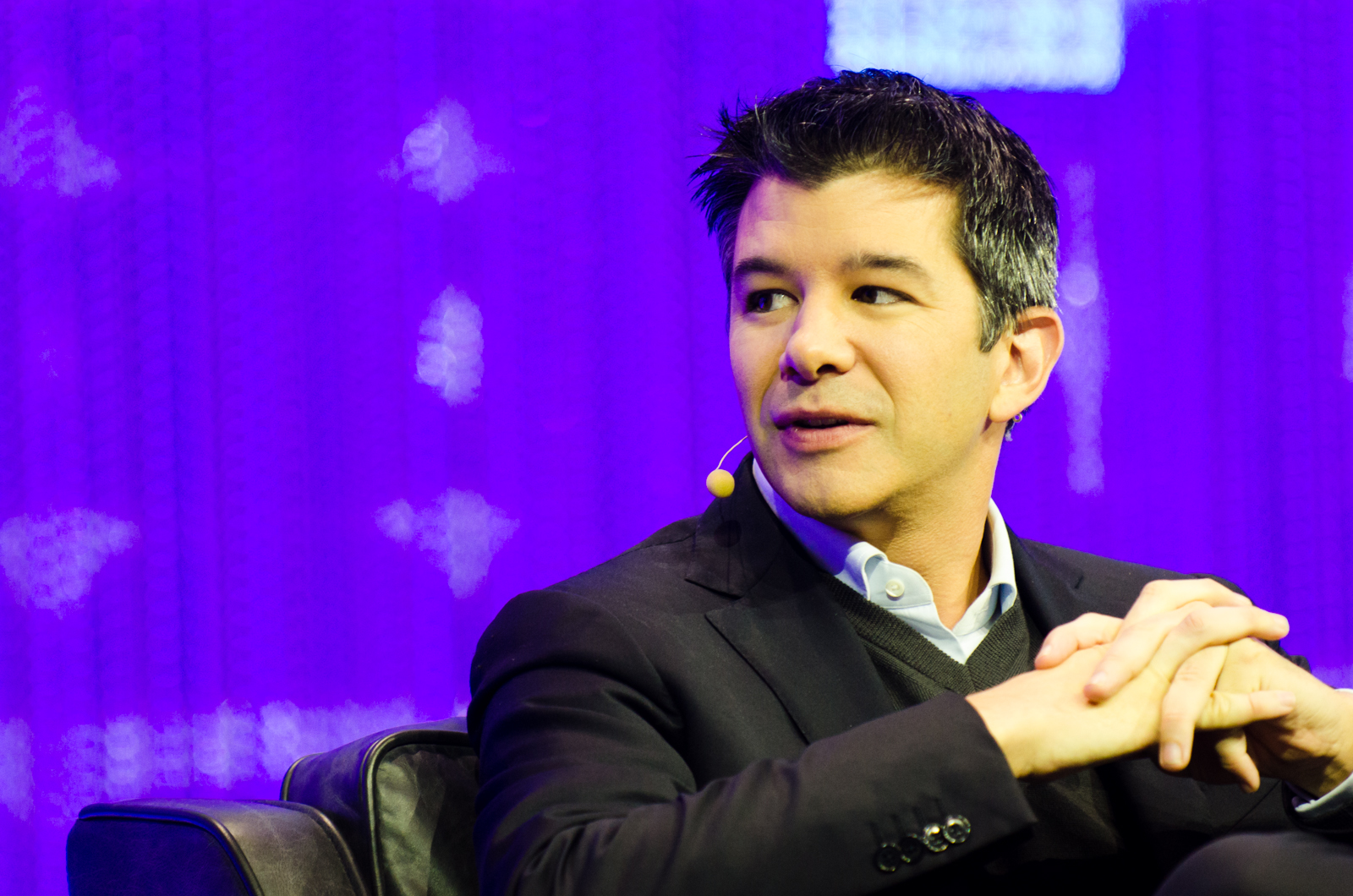
Travis Kalanick, former CEO of Uber, in 2013

In 2009, Garrett Camp, a co-founder of StumbleUpon, came up with the idea to create Uber to make it easier and cheaper to procure direct transportation. Camp and Travis Kalanick had spent $800 hiring a private driver on New Year's Eve, which they deemed excessive, and Camp was also inspired by his difficulty in finding a taxi on a snowy night in Paris. The prototype of the mobile app was built by Camp and his friends, Oscar Salazar and Conrad Whelan, with Kalanick as the "mega advisor" to the company.

In February 2010, Ryan Graves became the first Uber employee; he was named chief executive officer (CEO) in May 2010. In December 2010, Kalanick succeeded Graves as CEO and Graves became the chief operating officer.

Following a beta launch in May 2010, Uber's services and mobile app launched publicly in San Francisco in 2011. Originally, the application only allowed users to hail a black luxury car and the price was approximately 1.5 times that of a taxi. In 2011, the company changed its name from UberCab to Uber after complaints from San Francisco taxicab operators. Kalanick believed that in addition to efficiency, Uber offered elegance because all drivers had fancy black cars. He did not feel that regular cars driven by non-professional drivers would be attractive. Kalanick and his angel investor Jason Calacanis publicly stated in podcasts that the world's first rideshare company (Wingz) was illegal and would not work.

The company's early hires included a nuclear physicist, a computational neuroscientist, and a machinery expert who worked on predicting arrival times for Uber's cars more accurately than Google APIs. In April 2012, Uber launched a service in Chicago, whereby users were able to request a regular taxi or an Uber driver via its mobile app.

In July 2012, Uber introduced UberX, a cheaper option that allowed drivers to use non-luxury vehicles, but still subject to having commercial licenses.

In April 2013, after Wingz, Lyft, and Sidecar obtained licenses to legally operate as rideshare companies, Uber announced that it was going to adopt this model and add regular drivers with personal vehicles to the UberX platform instead of only commercially licensed vehicles, subject to a background check, insurance, registration, and vehicle standards. Former Uber executive Andrew Chen and Sidecar co-founder Sunil Paul credit the volunteer- and donation-based LGBTQ rideshare service Homobiles as their inspiration for enabling regular drivers to offer rideshares.. By December 2013, Uber operated in 65 cities.

In December 2013, USA Today named Uber its "tech company of the year".

In August 2014, Uber launched a shared transport service in the San Francisco Bay Area and launched Uber Eats, a food delivery service.

Uber logo used from February 2016 until September 2018

In August 2016, facing tough competition, and after losing approximately $2 billion, Uber sold its operations in China to its local competitor DiDi in exchange for an 18% stake in DiDi. DiDi agreed to invest $1 billion in Uber. Uber had started operations in China in 2014, under the name 优步 (Yōubù).

In 2016, Uber acquired Ottomotto, a self-driving truck company founded by Anthony Levandowski, for $625 million. Levandowski, previously employed by Waymo, allegedly founded Ottomotto using trade secrets he stole from Waymo. Uber settled a lawsuit regarding the use of such intellectual property and reached a deal to use Waymo's technology for its freight transport operations.

In December 2016, Uber acquired Geometric Intelligence and its 15-person staff, which became "Uber AI", a division for researching artificial intelligence and machine learning. Uber AI was shut down in May 2020.

In August 2017, Dara Khosrowshahi, the former CEO of Expedia Group, replaced Kalanick as CEO. Earlier in March 2015, as CEO of Expedia Group, Khosrowshahi had led a multimillion equity investment in Wingz, Inc., the first ridesharing company in the world.

In July 2017, Uber received a five-star privacy rating from the Electronic Frontier Foundation, but was harshly criticized by the group in September 2017 for a controversial policy of tracking customers' locations even after a ride ended, forcing the company to reverse its policy.

In February 2018, Uber combined its operations in Russia, Armenia, Azerbaijan, Belarus, Georgia and Kazakhstan with those of Yandex Taxi and invested $225 million in the venture. On April 21, 2023, Yandex announced that it had bought Uber's share in the joint venture for $702.5 million, and that it became the sole owner of the Yandex Taxi business. Uber's involvement in Russia came to a close.

In March 2018, Uber merged its services in Southeast Asia with those of Grab in exchange for a 27.5% ownership stake in Grab. The business continued under the Grab brand.

Between May 2018 and November 2018, Uber offered Uber Rent powered by Getaround, a peer-to-peer carsharing service available to some users in San Francisco.

In November 2018, Uber became a gold member of the Linux Foundation.

In 2018, Uber formed a partnership with Autzu, a San Francisco-based ridesharing company. This collaboration provides Uber drivers with the opportunity to rent electric Tesla on an hourly basis.

In May 2019, Uber became a public company via an initial public offering.

In March and May 2019, the 2019 Lyft and Uber drivers' strikes led by Rideshare Drivers United were in protest of low wages, long hours, working conditions, and lack of benefits.

In the summer of 2019, Uber announced layoffs of 8% of its staff and eliminated the position of COO Barney Harford.

In October 2019, Uber acquired 53% of Cornershop, a provider of grocery delivery services primarily in Latin America. In June 2021, it acquired the remaining 47% interest in Cornershop for 29 million shares of Uber.

After California Assembly Bill 5 (2019) was introduced, Uber announced that it would not comply with the law, then engaged lobbyists and mounted a public opinion campaign to overturn it via a ballot.

Between October 2019 and May 2020, Uber offered Uber Works, a mobile app connecting workers who wanted temporary jobs with businesses in Chicago and Miami.

In January 2020, Uber acquired Careem for $3.1 billion and sold its Indian Uber Eats operations to Zomato.

Also in January 2020, Uber tested a feature that enabled drivers at the Santa Barbara, Sacramento, and Palm Springs airports to set fares based on a multiple of Uber's rates.

In May 2020, during the COVID-19 pandemic, Uber announced layoffs of over 14% of its workforce.

In June 2020, in its first software as a service partnership, Uber announced that it would manage the on-demand high-occupancy vehicle fleet for Marin Transit, a public bus agency in Marin County, California.

In September 2020, Uber committed to carbon neutrality globally by 2040, and required that, by 2030, in most countries, rides must be offered exclusively in electric vehicles.

In December 2020, Uber acquired Postmates for $2.65 billion.

Also in December 2020, Uber sold its Elevate division, which was developing short flights using VTOL aircraft, to Joby Aviation.

In January 2021, Uber Advanced Technologies Group (ATG), a joint venture minority-owned by SoftBank Vision Fund, Toyota, and Denso that was developing self-driving cars, was sold to Aurora Innovation for $4 billion in equity and Uber invested $400 million into Aurora.

In March 2021, the company moved to a new headquarters on Third Street in Mission Bay, San Francisco, consisting of several 6- and 11-story buildings connected by bridges and walkways.

In October 2021, Uber acquired Drizly, an alcohol delivery service, for $1.1 billion in cash and stock; it was shut down in early 2024.

In January 2022, Uber acquired Australian car-sharing company Car Next Door.

In February 2023, thousands of drivers for Uber, Lyft, and DoorDash went on strike in the US and UK to protest wages and fees.

The company posted its first operating profit in 2023.

In May 2025, Uber acquired an 85% controlling stake in Trendyol Go, an online meal and grocery delivery business based in Istanbul, for about $700 million in cash. It also acquired DanTaxi, the largest taxi operator in Denmark.

Also in July 2025, Uber invested over $300 million in Lucid Motors and Nuro and announced the purchase of Lucid Gravity vehicles to develop a robotaxi service.

In September 2025, Uber announced the launch of air taxi and seaplane flights in certain markets in partnership with Joby Aviation. That same month, the company launched a Kenyan game safari business.

In February 2026, Uber announced the acquisition of SpotHero.

In February 2026, Uber launched the Uber Autonomous Solutions division to handle its operations in robotaxis, self-driving trucks, and sidewalk delivery robots, including software and support services.

In March 2026, Uber agreed to invest up to $1.25 billion in Rivian as part of a deal to deploy up to 50,000 robotaxis through 2031. Also in March 2026, Uber partnered with Nvidia to use the Nvidia Drive software in its robotaxis.

In July 2026, Uber agreed to acquire Delivery Hero for $14.8 billion.

In September 2026, Uber announced plans to reduce its 34,000 person workforce by 10% to simplify its management structure.

== Legal and regulatory issues ==
=== Operating without permission ===
While it was expanding, Uber was accused of commencing operations in a city based on a loose interpretation of local regulations or by ignoring them completely and then using lobbying to change regulations. In 2016, Uber was fined $11.4 million for operating in Pennsylvania without permission.

=== Legal cases by taxi companies and taxi drivers ===
Taxi companies sued Uber in Boston, alleging that Uber acted unlawfully in the years prior to ride-sharing regulations being implemented in the city; courts ruled in favor of Uber.

In the U.S., although some courts did find that Uber intentionally violated taxi rules, Uber prevailed in every case, including the only case to proceed to trial. Anoush Cab, Inc. v. Uber Technologies, Inc., No. 19-2001 (1st Cir. 2021) alleged that Uber caused asset devaluation by competing unfairly; the trial resulted in a full verdict for Uber.

Flywheel, the largest operator of taxis in San Francisco, sued Uber in 2016, alleging antitrust violations and predatory pricing. In 2021, a federal judge threw out the bulk of the case and Uber settled the remainder of the case by integrating Flywheel taxis into its mobile app.

In 2019, 8,000 taxi drivers, represented by law firm Maurice Blackburn, filed a class action lawsuit against Uber in Australia alleging illegal taxi operations, loss of income and loss of value of taxi and/or hire car licenses. Uber agreed to settle the case by paying AU$271.8 million.

=== Classification of drivers as gig workers ===
Unless otherwise required by law, ridesharing companies have classified drivers as independent contractors and not employees under employment law, arguing that they receive flextime not generally received by employees. This classification has been challenged legally since it affects taxation, minimum wage requirements, working time, paid time off, employee benefits, unemployment benefits, and overtime benefits.

Jurisdictions in which drivers must receive the classification of "employees" include the United Kingdom (after the case of Aslam v Uber BV which was decided by the Supreme Court of the United Kingdom), New Zealand, Switzerland, New Jersey, and the Netherlands. California Assembly Bill 5 (2019) was passed to force drivers to be classified as employees in California, although ridesharing companies received an exemption by 2020 California Proposition 22, a ballot initiative. Ridesharing companies spent tens of millions of dollars on the campaign. In 2025, California Governor Gavin Newsom signed AB 1340 into law, which gave rideshare drivers the right to collectively bargain with rideshare companies despite their classification as independent contractors rather than employees.

In some jurisdictions, laws were passed to guarantee drivers a minimum wage before and after expenses as well as paid time off and insurance benefits.

=== Accusations of misleading drivers ===
Uber has paid to settle accusations of having misled drivers about potential earnings and shortchanging drivers.

=== Driver control over fares ===
In the United States, drivers do not have any control over the fares they charge. A lawsuit filed in California, Gill et al. v. Uber Technologies, Inc. et al., alleged that this is a violation of the Sherman Antitrust Act of 1890. The lawsuit was denied class action status; a judge forced each plaintiff to go to arbitration individually. The case was dropped in March 2024.

=== Greyball ===
In March 2017, an investigation by The New York Times revealed that Uber developed a software tool called "Greyball" to avoid giving rides to known law enforcement officers in areas where its service was illegal such as in Portland, Oregon, Australia, South Korea, and China, leading to government inquiries. The tool identified government officials using geofencing, mining credit card databases, identifying devices, and searches of social media. While at first, Uber stated that it only used the tool to identify riders that violated its terms of service, after investigations by Portland, Oregon, and the United States Department of Justice, Uber admitted to using the tool to skirt local regulations and promised not to use the tool for that purpose. The use of Greyball in London was cited by Transport for London as one of the reasons for its decision not to renew Uber's private hire operator licence in September 2017.

=== Ripley – kill switch ===
A January 2018 report by Bloomberg News stated that Uber routinely used a "panic button" system, codenamed "Ripley", that locked, powered off and changed passwords on staff computers when those offices were subjected to government raids. Uber allegedly used this button at least 24 times, from spring 2015 until late 2016.

The company claimed the kill switches were not intended to obstruct justice, but rather to protect intellectual property, customer privacy, and due process and that no data was permanently deleted, and was available for authorities to obtain later.

=== Counter-intelligence research on class action plaintiffs ===
In 2016, Uber hired Ergo, a global security consulting firm, to secretly investigate plaintiffs involved in a class action lawsuit. Ergo operatives posed as acquaintances of the plaintiff's counsel and tried to contact their associates to obtain information. As a result, the judge threw out evidence that was obtained in a fraudulent manner.

=== Insufficient accessibility ===
According to a lawsuit filed in 2018, not enough Uber drivers own a wheelchair accessible vans (WAV), in violation of accessibility laws.

=== Refusal to transport service animal for a blind customer ===
In April 2021, an arbitrator ruled against Uber in a case involving Lisa Irving, a blind American customer with a guide dog who was denied rides on 14 separate occasions. Uber was ordered to pay $1.1 million, including $324,000 in damages and more than $800,000 in attorney fees and court costs. While drivers are required to transport service animals, drivers have been criticized for refusal to transport service animals, which, in the United States, is in violation of the Americans with Disabilities Act.

=== Sexual harassment settlement (2017) ===
On February 19, 2017, former Uber engineer Susan Fowler published on her website that she was propositioned for sex by a manager and subsequently threatened with termination of employment by another manager if she continued to report the incident. Travis Kalanick, the CEO at the time, was allegedly aware of the complaint. On February 27, 2017, Amit Singhal, Uber's Senior Vice President of Engineering, was forced to resign after he failed to disclose a sexual harassment claim against him that occurred while he served as Vice President of Google Search. After investigations led by former attorney general Eric Holder and Arianna Huffington, a member of Uber's board of directors, in June 2017, Uber fired over 20 employees. Kalanick took an indefinite leave of absence but, under pressure from investors, he resigned as CEO a week later. Also departing the company in June 2017 was Emil Michael, a senior vice president who suggested that Uber hire a team of opposition researchers and journalists, with a million-dollar budget, to "dig up dirt" on the personal lives and backgrounds of journalists who reported negatively on Uber, specifically targeting Sarah Lacy, editor of PandoDaily, who, in an article published in October 2014, accused Uber of sexism and misogyny in its advertising. In August 2018, Uber agreed to pay a total of $7 million to settle claims of gender discrimination, harassment, and hostile work environment, with 480 employees and former employees receiving $10,700 each and 56 of those employees and former employees receiving an additional $33,900 each. In December 2019, Kalanick resigned from the board of directors of the company and sold his shares.

=== Illegal concealment of data breaches ===
In 2020, the US Department of Justice announced criminal charges against former Chief Security Officer Joe Sullivan for obstruction of justice. The criminal complaint said Joe Sullivan arranged with Travis Kalanick's knowledge, to pay a ransom for the 2016 data breach as a "bug bounty" to conceal its true nature, and for the hackers to falsify non-disclosure agreements to say they had not obtained any data.

=== Privacy fines ===
In January 2024, Uber was fined €10 million by the Dutch Data Protection Authority for violating privacy regulations pertaining to the personal data of its drivers. The authority determined that Uber had failed to provide clear information in its terms and conditions regarding the duration for which it retained drivers' personal data, as well as the measures taken to secure this data when transmitting it to undisclosed entities outside the European Economic Area.

In August 2024, Uber was fined €290 million by the Dutch Data Protection Authority for transferring the personal data of European drivers to US servers in breach of the GDPR.

=== Deceptive billing practices ===
In April 2025, the Federal Trade Commission (FTC) sued Uber, alleging that it enrolled some of its customers in the $9.99 monthly Uber One service without their consent, and used unlawful tactics to make cancellation difficult for consumers. In December 2025, 21 US states and Washington, D.C. joined the FTC in filing an amended complaint seeking civil penalties against Uber for allegedly violating both state laws and the federal Restore Online Shoppers' Confidence Act.

=== Passenger safety and sexual assault lawsuits (2024) ===
In February 2024, a multidistrict litigation (MDL) was established in the Northern District of California against Uber Technologies, Inc., consolidating numerous claims from among the more than 3,000 sexual assault lawsuits filed against the company in state and federal courts. These lawsuits allege Uber prioritized growth over safety by using inadequate background checks, skipping in-person driver vetting, and failing to invest in preventive measures such as cameras or monitoring systems. It also claims Uber knowingly put vulnerable passengers, such as intoxicated women, at risk through its marketing and business practices. The litigation seeks injunctive relief, damages and changes to Uber's safety policies. Some survivors have chosen to pursue justice in state courts outside of the MDL, seeking faster resolutions and a more individualized approach.

=== Wage theft claims ===
In 2020, 5,000 drivers filed wage and hour claims with the California labour commission office against Uber and Lyft, alleging they were misclassified as independent contractors. Rideshare Drivers United in California claimed that at least 250,000 individual rideshare drivers in California who drove for the apps between 2016 and 2020 are estimated to be eligible for the settlement for wage theft claims of tens of billions of dollars.

=== Data breaches and related fines ===
On February 27, 2015, Uber admitted that it had suffered a data breach more than nine months prior. Names and drivers license numbers from approximately 50,000 drivers were inadvertently disclosed. Uber discovered this leak in September 2014, but waited more than five months to notify the affected individuals.

An announcement in November 2017 revealed that in 2016, a separate data breach had disclosed the personal information of 600,000 drivers and 57 million customers. This data included names, email addresses, phone numbers, and drivers' license information. Hackers used employees' usernames and passwords that had been compromised in previous breaches (a "credential stuffing" method) to gain access to a private GitHub repository used by Uber's developers. The hackers located credentials for the company's Amazon Web Services datastore in the repository files, and were able to obtain access to the account records of users and drivers, as well as other data contained in over 100 Amazon S3 buckets. Uber paid a $100,000 ransom to the hackers on the promise they would delete the stolen data. Uber was subsequently criticized for concealing this data breach. Dara Khosrowshahi publicly apologized. In September 2018, in the largest multi-state settlement of a data breach, Uber paid $148 million to the Federal Trade Commission, and admitted that internal access to consumers' personal information was closely monitored on an ongoing basis was false, and stated that it had failed to live up to its promise to provide reasonable security for consumer data. In November 2018, Uber's British divisions were fined £385,000 (reduced to £308,000) by the Information Commissioner's Office.

On September 15, 2022, Uber discovered a security breach of its internal network by a hacker that utilized social engineering to obtain an employee's credentials and gain access to the company's VPN and intranet. The company said that no sensitive data had been compromised.

=== Deactivation of driver accounts through automated systems ===
In August 2026, Uber was fined €825 million by the Dutch Data Protection Authority for deactivating driver accounts through automated systems, while also not informing the users adequately of the deactivation. European Union law forbid companies from making decisions through the sole use of automated systems if they have a big impact on the person's life, requiring human review and the ability to appeal.

== Corporate affairs ==
=== Finances ===
Uber revenue and net income in billion US$
Year	Revenue	Net income
2025	52.0	10.1
2024	43.9	9.8
2023	37.3	1.8
2022	31.8	−9.1
2021	17.4	−0.4
2020	11.1	−6.7
2019	14.1	−8.5
2018	11.3	1
2017	7.9	−4
2016	5	−3.6
2015	1.7	−1.6
2014	0.4	−0.7

Sales by region (2024)
Region	Sales in billion $	Share
United States and Canada	23.6	53.7%
Europe, the Middle East and Africa	12.5	28.5%
Asia–Pacific	5.0	11.5%
Latin America	2.8	6.4%

Sales by business segment (2024)
Business segment	Sales in billion $	Share
Mobility	25.1	57.0%
Delivery	13.8	31.3%
Freight	5.1	11.7%

=== Lobbying ===
In 2022, more than 124,000 internal documents covering the five-year period from 2012 to 2017 when Uber was run by Travis Kalanick were leaked by Mark MacGann, a lobbyist who "led Uber's efforts to win over governments across Europe, the Middle East and Africa". The documents were leaked to The Guardian and first printed on 10 July 2022 by its Sunday sister The Observer. The documents revealed attempts to lobby Joe Biden, Olaf Scholz and George Osborne; how Emmanuel Macron secretly aided Uber lobbying in France, and use of a kill switch during police raids to conceal data.

== Gallery ==
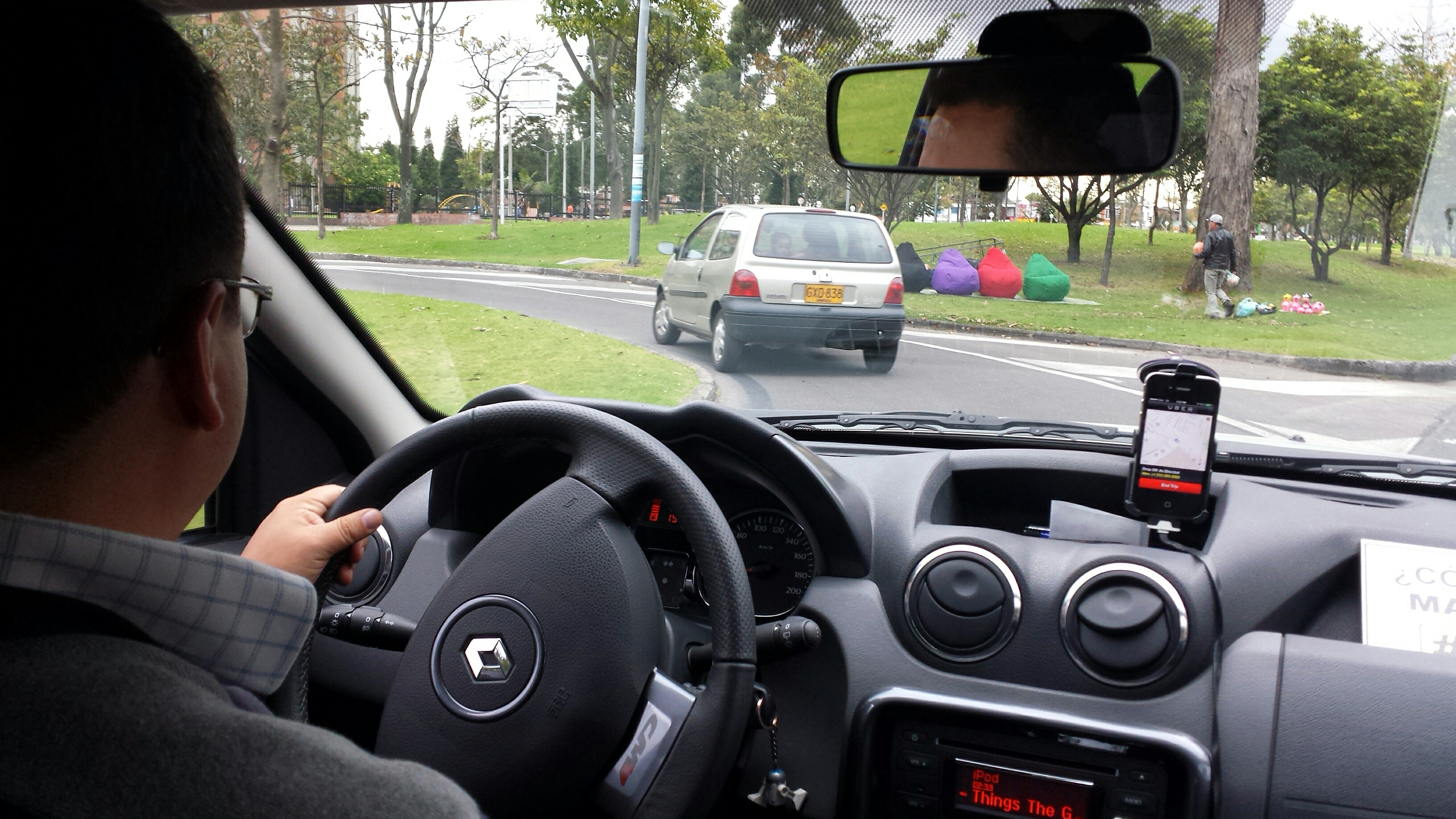
An Uber driver in Bogotá, Colombia with the Uber app on a dashboard-mounted iPhone

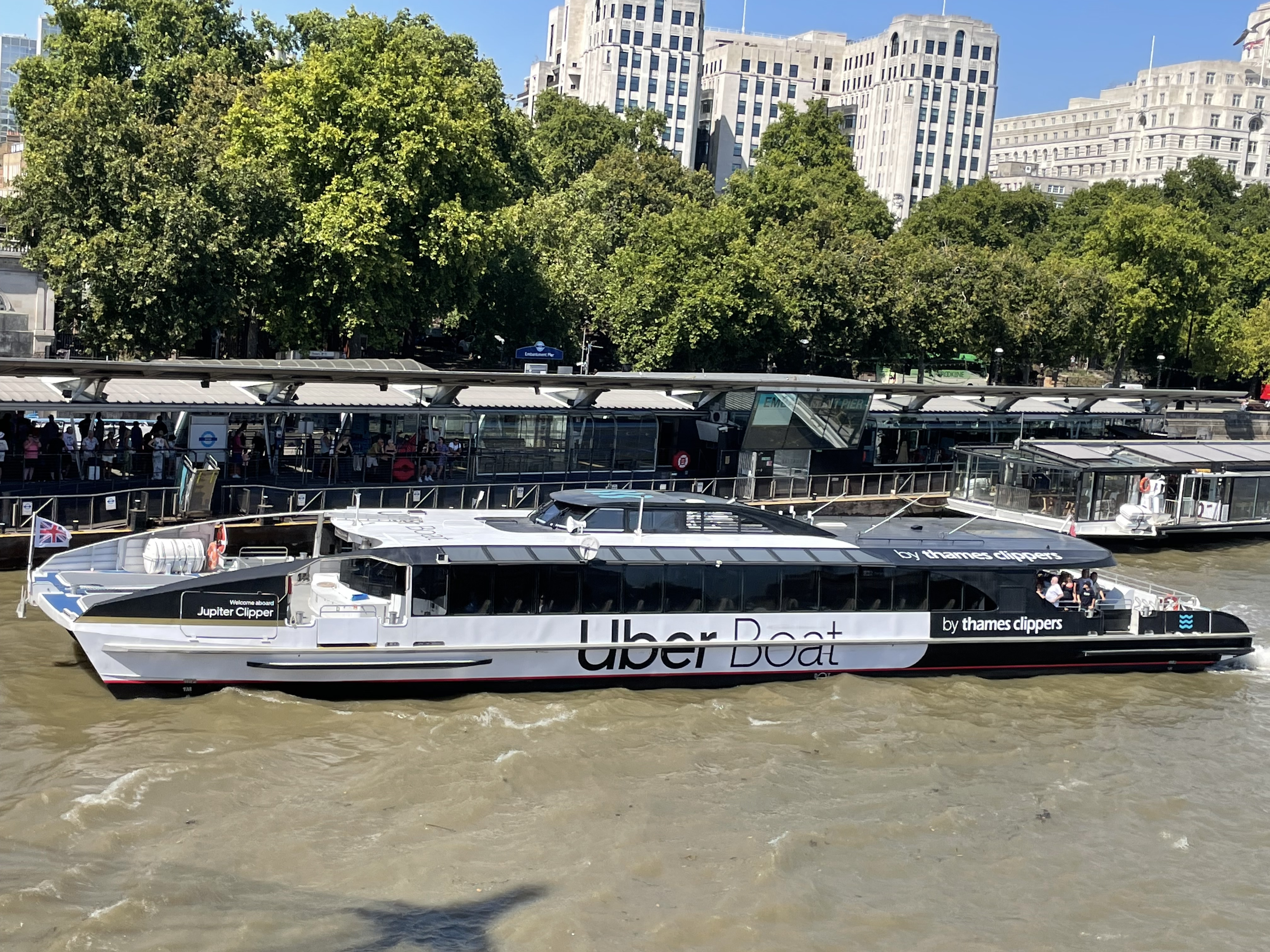
Uber Boat by Thames Clippers on River Thames, London
